= Ultratop 40 number-one hits of 1999 =

This is a list of songs that topped the Belgian Walloon (francophone) Ultratop 40 in 1999.

Date	Title	Artist
January 2	"Believe"	Cher
January 9	"Believe"	Cher
January 16	"Believe"	Cher
January 23	"Mais qui est la belette ?"	Manau
January 30	"Mais qui est la belette ?"	Manau
February 6	"Mais qui est la belette ?"	Manau
February 13	"Mais qui est la belette ?"	Manau
February 20	"Mais qui est la belette ?"	Manau
February 27	"Tu m'oublieras"	Larusso
March 6	"Tu m'oublieras"	Larusso
March 13	"Tu m'oublieras"	Larusso
March 20	"Tu m'oublieras"	Larusso
March 27	"...Baby One More Time"	Britney Spears
April 3	"...Baby One More Time"	Britney Spears
April 10	"...Baby One More Time"	Britney Spears
April 17	"...Baby One More Time"	Britney Spears
April 24	"...Baby One More Time"	Britney Spears
May 1	"...Baby One More Time"	Britney Spears
May 8	"...Baby One More Time"	Britney Spears
May 15	"...Baby One More Time"	Britney Spears
May 22	"...Baby One More Time"	Britney Spears
May 29	"Au nom de la rose"	Moos
June 5	"Au nom de la rose"	Moos
June 12	"Au nom de la rose"	Moos
June 19	"Au nom de la rose"	Moos
June 26	"Au nom de la rose"	Moos
July 3	"Au nom de la rose"	Moos
July 10	"Au nom de la rose"	Moos
July 17	"Au nom de la rose"	Moos
July 24	"Jamais loin de toi"	Lââm
July 31	"Jamais loin de toi"	Lââm
August 7	"Jamais loin de toi"	Lââm
August 14	"Jamais loin de toi"	Lââm
August 21	"Mambo No. 5"	Lou Bega
August 28	"Mambo No. 5"	Lou Bega
September 4	"Mambo No. 5"	Lou Bega
September 11	"Mambo No. 5"	Lou Bega
September 18	"Mambo No. 5"	Lou Bega
September 25	"Mambo No. 5"	Lou Bega
October 2	"Mambo No. 5"	Lou Bega
October 9	"Mambo No. 5"	Lou Bega
October 16	"Mambo No. 5"	Lou Bega
October 23	"(You Drive Me) Crazy"	Britney Spears
October 30	"(You Drive Me) Crazy"	Britney Spears
November 6	"If I Could Turn Back the Hands of Time"	R. Kelly
November 13	"If I Could Turn Back the Hands of Time"	R. Kelly
November 20	"If I Could Turn Back the Hands of Time"	R. Kelly
November 27	"If I Could Turn Back the Hands of Time"	R. Kelly
December 4	"If I Could Turn Back the Hands of Time"	R. Kelly
December 11	"If I Could Turn Back the Hands of Time"	R. Kelly
December 18	"If I Could Turn Back the Hands of Time"	R. Kelly
December 25	"Aller plus haut"	Tina Arena

== See also ==
- 1999 in music
