= List of number-one singles of 1999 (France) =

This is a list of the French SNEP Top 100 Singles and Top 75 Albums number-ones of 1999.

== Number-ones by week ==
=== Singles Chart ===
Week	Issue Date	Artist	Single
1	January 2	Daniel Lavoie, Patrick Fiori & Garou	"Belle"
2	January 9	Daniel Lavoie, Patrick Fiori & Garou	"Belle"
3	January 16	Manau	"Mais qui est la belette ?"
4	January 23	Cher	"Believe"
5	January 30	Larusso	"Tu m'oublieras"
6	February 6	Larusso	"Tu m'oublieras"
7	February 13	Larusso	"Tu m'oublieras"
8	February 20	Larusso	"Tu m'oublieras"
9	February 27	Larusso	"Tu m'oublieras"
10	March 6	Larusso	"Tu m'oublieras"
11	March 13	Larusso	"Tu m'oublieras"
12	March 20	Larusso	"Tu m'oublieras"
13	March 27	Larusso	"Tu m'oublieras"
14	April 3	Larusso	"Tu m'oublieras"
15	April 10	Larusso	"Tu m'oublieras"
16	April 17	Larusso	"Tu m'oublieras"
17	April 24	Britney Spears	"...Baby One More Time"
18	May 1	Britney Spears	"...Baby One More Time"
19	May 8	Moos	"Au nom de la rose"
20	May 15	Moos	"Au nom de la rose"
21	May 22	Moos	"Au nom de la rose"
22	May 29	Moos	"Au nom de la rose"
23	June 5	Moos	"Au nom de la rose"
24	June 12	Moos	"Au nom de la rose"
25	June 19	Moos	"Au nom de la rose"
26	June 26	Moos	"Au nom de la rose"
27	July 3	Moos	"Au nom de la rose"
28	July 10	David Hallyday	"Tu ne m'as pas laissé le temps"
29	July 17	Zebda	"Tomber la chemise"
30	July 24	Zebda	"Tomber la chemise"
31	July 31	Zebda	"Tomber la chemise"
32	August 7	Eiffel 65	"Blue (Da Ba Dee)"
33	August 14	Eiffel 65	"Blue (Da Ba Dee)"
34	August 21	Eiffel 65	"Blue (Da Ba Dee)"
35	August 28	Lou Bega	"Mambo No. 5"
36	September 4	Lou Bega	"Mambo No. 5"
37	September 11	Lou Bega	"Mambo No. 5"
38	September 18	Lou Bega	"Mambo No. 5"
39	September 25	Lou Bega	"Mambo No. 5"
40	October 2	Lou Bega	"Mambo No. 5"
41	October 9	Lou Bega	"Mambo No. 5"
42	October 16	Lou Bega	"Mambo No. 5"
43	October 23	Lou Bega	"Mambo No. 5"
44	October 30	Lou Bega	"Mambo No. 5"
45	November 6	Lou Bega	"Mambo No. 5"
46	November 13	Lou Bega	"Mambo No. 5"
47	November 20	Lou Bega	"Mambo No. 5"
48	November 27	Lou Bega	"Mambo No. 5"
49	December 4	Lou Bega	"Mambo No. 5"
50	December 11	Lou Bega	"Mambo No. 5"
51	December 18	Lou Bega	"Mambo No. 5"
52	December 25	Lou Bega	"Mambo No. 5"
53	January 1	Lou Bega	"Mambo No. 5"

=== Albums Chart ===
Week	Issue Date	Artist	Single
1	9 January	Notre Dame de Paris	Notre Dame de Paris
2	16 January	Notre Dame de Paris	Notre Dame de Paris
3	23 January	Manau	Panique celtique
4	30 January	Manau	Panique celtique
5	6 February	Notre Dame de Paris	Notre Dame de Paris
6	13 February	Notre Dame de Paris	Notre Dame de Paris
7	20 February	Notre Dame de Paris	Notre Dame de Paris
8	27 February	Lara Fabian	Live
9	6 March	Lara Fabian	Live
10	13 March	Lara Fabian	Live
11	20 March	Lara Fabian	Live
12	27 March	Axelle Red	Toujours Moi
13	3 April	Francis Cabrel	Hors saison
14	10 April	Francis Cabrel	Hors saison
15	17 April	Francis Cabrel	Hors saison
16	24 April	Francis Cabrel	Hors saison
17	1 May	Francis Cabrel	Hors saison
18	8 May	Francis Cabrel	Hors saison
19	15 May	Francis Cabrel	Hors saison
20	22 May	Francis Cabrel	Hors saison
21	29 May	Francis Cabrel	Hors saison
22	5 June	Francis Cabrel	Hors saison
23	12 June	Francis Cabrel	Hors saison
24	19 June	Jean-Jacques Goldman	Tournée 98 en passant
25	26 June	Jean-Jacques Goldman	Tournée 98 en passant
26	3 July	Jean-Jacques Goldman	Tournée 98 en passant
27	10 July	Jean-Jacques Goldman	Tournée 98 en passant
28	17 July	Francis Cabrel	Hors saison
29	24 July	Francis Cabrel	Hors saison
30	31 July	Francis Cabrel	Hors saison
31	7 August	Emile & Images	Jusqu'au bout de la nuit
32	14 August	Emile & Images	Jusqu'au bout de la nuit
33	21 August	Emile & Images	Jusqu'au bout de la nuit
34	28 August	Emile & Images	Jusqu'au bout de la nuit
35	4 September	Céline Dion	Au cœur du stade
36	11 September	Céline Dion	Au coeur du stade
37	18 September	Johnny Hallyday	Sang pour sang
38	25 September	Johnny Hallyday	Sang pour sang
39	2 October	Johnny Hallyday	Sang pour sang
40	9 October	Johnny Hallydya	Sang pour sang
41	16 October	Johnny Hallyday	Sang pour sang
42	23 October	Patrick Bruel	Juste avant
43	30 October	Florent Pagny	RéCréation
44	6 November	Mariah Carey	Rainbow
45	13 November	Johnny Hallyday	Sang pour sang
46	20 November	Alain Souchon	Au ras des pâquerettes
47	27 November	Alain Souchon	Au ras des pâquerettes
48	4 December	Lara Fabian	Lara Fabian
49	11 December	Johnny Hallyday	Sang pour sang
50	18 December	Johnny Hallyday	Sang pour sang
51	25 December	Johnny Hallyday	Sang pour sang
52	1 January	Johnny Hallyday	Sang pour sang

== Top Ten Best Sales ==
This is the ten best-selling singles and albums in 1999.

=== Singles ===
Pos.	Artist	Title
1	Lou Bega	"Mambo No. 5"
2	Larusso	"Tu m'oublieras"
3	Moos	"Au Nom de la rose"
4	Eiffel 65	"Blue (Da Ba Dee)"
5	Zebda	"Tomber la chemise"
6	David Hallyday	"Tu ne m'as pas laissé le temps"
7	Britney Spears	"... Baby One More Time"
8	Emilia	"Big Big World"
9	Lââm	"Jamais loin de toi"
10	Tina Arena	"Aller plus haut"

=== Albums ===
Pos.	Artist	Title
1	Francis Cabrel	Hors saison
2	Johnny Hallyday	Sang pour sang
3	Notre Dame de Paris	Notre Dame de Paris
4	Mylène Farmer	Innamoramento
5	Manau	Panique celtique
6	Manu Chao	Clandestino
7	Emile & Images	Jusqu'au bout de la nuit
8	Céline Dion	S'il suffisait d'aimer
9	The Offspring	Americana
10	Notre Dame de Paris	L'intégrale

== See also ==
- 1999 in music
- List of number-one singles in France
- List of artists who reached number one on the French Singles Chart
