= Snow on the Sahara (song) =

Single by Anggun

from the album Snow on the Sahara
- Released: 1997
- Recorded: 1997
- Genre: New-age, world
- Length: 4:19
- Label: Columbia; Sony Music
- Songwriters: Erick Benzi; Nikki Matheson (English lyrics)
- Producer: Erick Benzi

Anggun singles chronology
"Snow on the Sahara" (1997)	"A Rose in the Wind" (1998)

Music videos
- "Snow on the Sahara" on YouTube; "La neige au Sahara" on YouTube

"Snow on the Sahara" (titled "La neige au Sahara" for the French version) is a song recorded by Indonesian singer Anggun for her first international studio album Snow on the Sahara (1997). Originally written in French by its producer Erick Benzi, the song was adapted to English by Nikki Matheson. The song was released in 1997 as her debut international single in 33 countries worldwide.

The song topped the charts in Italy and several countries in Asia. The French version quickly became a hit in France, peaking at number 3 on the French Airplay Chart and number 16 on the French Singles Chart. It became the most-played French-language single of 1997, with a total of 7,900 radio airplays, and was certified Gold for shipment of 250,000 copies.

Two music videos were shot to accompany the song. The first video was directed by Philippe Gautier in Bali, Indonesia, while the second one was made by Anthea Benton for North American release. The video of "Snow on the Sahara" received heavy rotation on MTV Asia, with Anggun being picked as the "Hot Seat Artist of the Month" in September 1998.

== Background and composition ==
Anggun's "Snow on the Sahara"
Sample of Anggun's "Snow on the Sahara".

The song was written, produced and arranged by Erick Benzi and later adapted into English by songwriter Nikki Matheson. The song remains to be Anggun's signature song across the world and catapulted Anggun's fame in the international music scene in 1997 and 1998. Sarah Brightman performed a cover version of the song on her album The Harem World Tour: Live from Las Vegas. The song is mainly built on synthesizer and keyboard sounds, mixed with tribal beats. It is considered to be an adult contemporary song, while some others consider it new-age or world music.

== Music video ==
There are 2 versions of the music video for Snow on the Sahara. The first version was shot in Bali and features storyline about Anggun and her lover becoming the sacrifice for some ancient ritual. This version was used also La Neige au Sahara. The second version features Anggun in an "art room" filled with antique furniture. She was also shot in an ice-blue background, singing the lines of the song. This version received less airplay and was only released for the US and Italian television. The length of this version is shorter than the first one, fading in 3:39. Both version received heavy rotation on MTV Asia and managed to topped the MTV Asia Hitlist chart for two weeks. Making her the first Asian artist to do so.

== Track listing ==
1. "Snow on the Sahara" (4:20)
2. "Selamanya" (2:21)
3. "La Neige au Sahara" (4:20)

== Chart performance ==
=== Weekly charts ===
Weekly chart performance for "Snow on the Sahara"
Chart (1997–99)	Peak position
Belgium (Ultratop 50 Wallonia)	24
European Border Breakers (Music & Media)	6
Finland (Suomen virallinen lista)	20
France (SNEP)	16
French Airplay (SNEP)	3
Germany (GfK)	55
Italy (FIMI)	1
Italian Airplay (Music & Media)	3
Malaysia (RIM)	1
Spain (Promusicae)	16
Switzerland (Schweizer Hitparade)	24
UK Singles (The Official Charts Company)	184
UK Club Breakers (Music Week)	3
UK Pop Top 20 (Music Week)	6
US Dance Club Songs (Billboard)	16
US Adult Pop Airplay (Billboard)	22

=== Year-end charts ===
Annual chart rankings for "Snow on the Sahara"
Chart (1997)	Position
France (SNEP)	44
Japan (Tokio Hot 100, 1997)	46

Chart (1999)	Position
Europe Border Breakers (Music & Media)	40
Europe Border Breakers (Music & Media) "La Neige au Sahara"	47
Italy (Musica e Dischi)	3

== Certification and sales ==
Certifications and sales for "Snow on the Sahara"
Region	Certification	Certified units/sales
France (SNEP)	Gold	250,000^{*}
Italy	—	150,000
Summaries
Europe	—	1,000,000
^{*} Sales figures based on certification alone.

== See also ==
- List of number-one hits of 1999 (Italy)
