= Snow on the Sahara =

- English version artwork

Studio album by Anggun
- Released: 24 June 1997
- Recorded: 1996–1997
- Genre: World; pop
- Length: 49:22 (English version); 46:01 (French version)
- Language: English; French; Indonesian
- Label: Columbia; Sony Music
- Producer: Erick Benzi

Anggun chronology
Yang Hilang (1994)	Snow on the Sahara (1997)	Chrysalis (2000)

Alternative cover
- French version artwork

Singles from Snow on the Sahara
- 1. "Snow on the Sahara" / "La neige au Sahara" Released: 9 May 1997; 2. "A Rose in the Wind" / "Kembali" / "La rose des vents" Released: 26 November 1997; 3. "Au nom de la lune" Released: 1998; 4. "La ligne des sens" Released: 1998

Snow on the Sahara (English version) or Au nom de la lune (French version) is the fifth studio album and first international release by Indonesian singer Anggun. The French version was first released in France on 24 June 1997 by Columbia Records. The English version, also titled Anggun in some pressings, was later released internationally by major label Sony Music Entertainment in 33 countries throughout Asia, Europe, and America between late 1997 to early 1999. The album was a huge artistic departure from Anggun's earlier rock style, experimenting with world music sounds.

Anggun promoted the album for three years, touring many countries around the world. She performed on American TV programs such as The Rosie O'Donnell Show, Sessions at West 54th, and Penn & Teller's Sin City Spectacular. Several singles were released to promote the album, with "Snow on the Sahara" or "La neige au Sahara" being the most successful. It topped the charts in Italy, Spain, and several Asian countries, and became the most-played song of 1997 in France. The album received positive response from music critics, with American media The SouthtownStar ranking it as one of Top 25 Albums of the year. With sales of more than one million copies worldwide, Snow on the Sahara became the best-selling album by Asian artist outside Asia at the time.

== Recording and development ==
In 1996, Anggun was introduced to French musician Erick Benzi, who previously had produced albums of well-known artists such as Celine Dion, Jean-Jacques Goldman and Johnny Hallyday. Anggun called their professional relationship as "love at first sight", saying that "Erick was the person I've always wanted to meet. It's a kind of chemistry you find once in a lifetime." Impressed by Anggun's talent, Benzi immediately offered to produce her record. Later that year, Anggun was signed to Columbia France and Sony Music Entertainment, making her the first Indonesian citizen in history to join an international major label.

The album was produced entirely by Erick Benzi who also arranged, engineered, mixed, and wrote majority of the songs. Other songwriters working for the album include Jacques Veneruso, Herve Teboul, and Nicolas Mingot, as well as Nikki Matheson who was responsible in translating all the original French songs from Au nom de la lune into English for Snow on the Sahara. Anggun herself co-wrote three tracks—the half-Indonesian "On the Breath of an Angel" ("À la plume de tes doigts"), and the full-Indonesian "Gita" and "Selamanya". She also wrote "Kembali", the Indonesian version of "A Rose in the Wind" ("La rose des vents"), which was released exclusively for Indonesia and Malaysia. Anggun explained her involvement during the album's production:

I was there from A to Z. I told Eric my stories: about my life in Indonesia, about my travels to London and Paris. about my hopes and dreams. Every time he had an idea, he'd call me up and I'd tell him 'okay, that part I like, that part I don't like'—until the song was finished. So these songs are really reflections of my life, and this music is really my music in every sense.

== Release and promotion ==
Au nom de la lune was released in France on 24 June 1997 by Columbia Records. The English version was released afterward in 33 countries worldwide under two titles, Snow on the Sahara and Anggun, with various artworks and track listings. In Japan, the album was released in late 1997 with three additional tracks from the French version ("La Neige au Sahara", "De Soleil et d'ombres" and "La Rose des vents") while in Indonesia, the album was released with the song "A Rose in the Wind" was recorded in Indonesian, titled "Kembali" and "By the Moon" was replaced with its French original version, "Au nom de la lune". The album was released in North America with "Memory of Your Shores" and interludes on the original version were omitted.

Anggun took about three years to release and promote the album across the globe. She toured the United States for about nine months. "On the Breath of an Angel" was used as the soundtrack of American television series Passions (1999) and television film The Princess and the Marine, both of which were broadcast on NBC. "A Rose in the Wind" also became the theme song of National Basketball Association (NBA) and was included on its 1999 compilation album I Still Love This Game!: NBA Commemorative Collection. "Snow on the Sahara" was also used as the soundtrack for an international marketing campaign launched by the Swiss watchmaker Swatch.

== Singles ==
"La neige au Sahara" was released as the lead single from the French version. It quickly became a hit in France, peaking at number one on the French Airplay Chart and number 16 on the French Singles Chart. It became the most-played song in France of 1997, with a total of 7,900 radio airplays, and was certified gold for shipment of 250,000 copies. It was followed with the release of two moderately charting singles, "La rose des vents" and "Au nom de la lune", which peaked at number 49 and 60 respectively on the French Singles Chart. "La ligne des sense" was released as the final single from the French version, but failed to enter the chart.

"Snow on the Sahara" was released as the first single from the English version for international market. The single was a commercial success, reaching number one in Italy, Spain and several countries in Asia, and the top five on the UK Club Chart. It was also used as the soundtrack for an international marketing campaign launched by the Swiss watchmaker Swatch. The second single from the album, "A Rose in the Wind", became her second top 20 hit in Italy, peaking at number 17 on the FIMI Singles Chart. Its Indonesian version, "Kembali", was also released for Southeast Asian market and became number-one radio hit in Indonesia and Malaysia. The album also spawned three promotional single for certain territories—"Dream of Me" in Japan, "Life on Mars" in the United States and "Memory of Your Shores" in Europe.

== Critical reception ==
Professional ratings
Review scores
Source	Rating
Allmusic	4/5 stars
The Boston Phoenix	favorable
Chicago Tribune	favorable
The SouthtownStar	3.5/4 stars
Vibe	favorable

Music critic Stephen Thomas Erlewine from Allmusic, who gave the album four out of five stars, called Snow on the Sahara "a promising debut effort" because "she illustrates enough full-formed talent on the disc". According to Erlewine, Anggun "tackles polished ballads, Latin-pop and dance-pop on Snow on the Sahara, demonstrating that she can sing all the styles quite well." Michael Freedberg from Boston Phoenix believed that the album "is how romanticism sounds when it rides the waves of limitless ambition and a virtuoso conceit as big as any rapper's brag or loverboy's smooch." Brad Webber from Chicago Tribune felt that the album "showcases the superbly talented mezzo-soprano's tool". He further explained: "The record's oft-overproduced quality sometimes provides Anggun's tool with not a nice veneer, but rather a good shellacking. The heavily layered harmonies and overwhelming array of techno bells and whistles—literally—work, but the idea of culling Southeast Asian flavors with twangy guitars come off like the calling of a cobra. Thankfully, there is Anggun and her mesmerizing abilities, which shine through it all."

Chuck Taylor from Billboard described the album as "soul-searching, wildly atmospheric, and as elegant as velvet" and dubbed Anggun as "the year's best undiscovered treasure." Mykella Van Cooten from Vibe magazine hailed Snow on the Sahara as an "outstanding" debut album and complimented Anggun's "aching, Annie Lennox-flavored vocals." She also credited Erick Benzi who "enriched the album with deep, passionate verses ('Snow on the Sahara') and shoothing, synthesized instrumentation (including chimes, symbols, rain sticks, and flutes)." John Everson from The SouthtownStar praised the album as "a delicious mix of beautiful mood and melody and one of the best albums of the summer." He ranked the album at number 20 on the list of "Top 25 Albums of 1998" and stated that Anggun deserved to be nominated in the Best New Artist category at the 41st Grammy Awards. Robert Christgau, on the contrary, gave the album a "dud" score.

Anggun received a nomination for the La révélation de l'année award (Revelation of the Year/Best New Artist) at the 1998 Victoires de la Musique, the highest award ceremony in France presented by French Minister of Culture. Despite being one of the first foreign acts to achieve that feat, she ultimately lost the award to Lara Fabian. Indonesian magazine Tempo believed that reception of the album was "underrated".

== Commercial performance ==
Au nom de la lune entered the French Albums Chart at number 50 on the issue date of 12 July 1997. It peaked at number 34 and remained on the chart for 17 weeks. The album was certified gold by the Syndicat National de l'Édition Phonographique for accumulating sales of over 100,000 copies in France, with 82,000 of which being sold in just four weeks. The English version for Indonesia market, Anggun, topped the Indonesian Albums Chart and sold over 50,000 copies in two weeks. The album was later certified triple platinum. Anggun entered European Top 100 Albums chart at number 99 on 27 March 1999. It spent a total of 10 weeks on the chart, with peak position of number 69.

In the United States, the album reached number 23 on the Heatseekers Albums Chart compiled by Billboard. According to Sony Music, the album has sold 120,000 copies in the United States as of May 1999. In Italy, the album peaked at number seven on the Italian Albums Chart and was certified gold. In Malaysia, the album was certified platinum. Snow on the Sahara has sold more than one million copies worldwide and received Diamond Export Sales Award. To celebrate the 17th anniversary of the album in 2013, Sony Music Indonesia honored Snow on the Sahara with a Diamond Award for becoming the all-time best-selling album by an Indonesian artist abroad.

== Track listing ==
=== English version ===
All tracks are written by Erick Benzi and Nikki Matheson, except where noted.

Snow on the Sahara / Anggun – International standard edition
No.	Title	Writer(s)	Length
1.	"Snow on the Sahara"		4:18
2.	"Le départ"	Benzi	0:29
3.	"Over Their Walls"		3:12
4.	"On the Breath of an Angel"	Nikki Matheson; Jacques Veneruso; Anggun	3:31
5.	"A Rose in the Wind"		4:24
6.	"Gita"	Anggun; Hervé Teboul	0:28
7.	"Memory of Your Shores"	Benzi; Matheson; Nicolas Mingot	3:59
8.	"My Sensual Mind"		4:32
9.	"Blanca"	Benzi	0:41
10.	"Valparaíso"		3:56
11.	"Selamanya"	Anggun; Benzi	2:21
12.	"By the Moon"		4:09
13.	"Pluies"	Veneruso	0:55
14.	"Dream of Me"	Veneruso; Matheson	4:01
15.	"Secret of the Sea"		4:16
16.	"Life on Mars"	David Bowie	4:10
Total length:			49:22

Snow on the Sahara – Asian limited edition bonus tracks
No.	Title	Writer(s)	Length
17.	"La neige au Sahara"	Benzi	4:18
18.	"À la plume de tes doigts"	Jacques Veneruso; Anggun	3:31
19.	"Au nom de la lune"		4:09

Anggun – Japanese edition bonus tracks
No.	Title	Writer(s)	Length
17.	"La neige au Sahara"	Benzi	4:18
18.	"La rose des vents"	Benzi	4:24
19.	"De soleils et d'ombres"	Veneruso	4:01

Anggun – Indonesian edition
No.	Title	Writer(s)	Length
1.	"Snow on the Sahara"		4:18
2.	"Le départ"	Benzi	0:29
3.	"Over Their Walls"		3:12
4.	"On the Breath of an Angel"	Nikki Matheson; Jacques Veneruso; Anggun	3:31
5.	"Kembali"		4:24
6.	"Gita"	Anggun; Hervé Teboul	0:28
7.	"Memory of Your Shores"	Benzi; Matheson; Nicolas Mingot	3:59
8.	"My Sensual Mind"		4:32
9.	"Blanca"	Benzi	0:41
10.	"Valparaíso"		3:56
11.	"Selamanya"	Anggun; Benzi	2:21
12.	"Au nom de la lune"		4:09
13.	"Pluies"	Veneruso	0:55
14.	"Dream of Me"	Veneruso; Matheson	4:01
15.	"Secret of the Sea"		4:16
16.	"Life on Mars"	David Bowie	4:10

Anggun – Malaysian edition
No.	Title	Length
17.	"A Rose in the Wind"	4:24

Snow on the Sahara – US edition
No.	Title	Writer(s)	Length
1.	"Snow on the Sahara"		4:18
2.	"Over Their Walls"		3:12
3.	"On the Breath of an Angel"	Nikki Matheson; Jacques Veneruso; Anggun	3:31
4.	"A Rose in the Wind"		4:24
5.	"My Sensual Mind"		4:32
6.	"Valparaíso"		4:41
7.	"Selamanya"	Anggun; Benzi	2:21
8.	"By the Moon"		4:09
9.	"Dream of Me"	Veneruso; Matheson	4:01
10.	"Secret of the Sea"		4:16
11.	"Life on Mars"	David Bowie	4:10

=== French version ===
All tracks are written by Erick Benzi, except where noted.

Au nom de la lune – French standard edition
No.	Title	Writer(s)	Length
1.	"La Neige au Sahara"		4:18
2.	"Le Départ"		0:29
3.	"Plus fort que les frontières"		3:12
4.	"À la plume de tes doigts"	Jacques Veneruso; Anggun	3:31
5.	"La Rose des vents"		4:24
6.	"Gita"	Anggun; Hervé Teboul	0:28
7.	"La Mémoire des rochers"	Benzi; Nicolas Mingot	3:59
8.	"La Ligne des sens"		4:32
9.	"Blanca"		0:41
10.	"Valparaíso"		3:56
11.	"Selamanya"	Anggun; Benzi	2:21
12.	"Au nom de la lune"		4:09
13.	"Pluies"	Veneruso	0:55
14.	"De soleils et d'ombres"	Veneruso	4:01
15.	"Always"	Veneruso	4:16
16.	"Ceria"		0:49
Total length:			46:01

Notes

- In the US edition, the interlude "Blanca" is combined with "Valparaíso" into one track.
- The Japanese edition includes three French songs from Au nom de la lune
- The Asian limited edition includes three French songs from Au nom de la lune
- The Indonesian edition includes "Kembali", the Indonesian version of "A Rose in the Wind"
- The Malaysian edition includes both "Kembali" and "A Rose in the Wind"

== Credits and personnel ==
- Anggun – lead vocals, harmony vocals, songwriting
- Gildas Arzel – electric guitar
- Erick Benzi – arranger, engineer, keyboards, mixing, producer, programming, sampling, harmony vocals, recording
- Nicolas Duport – mixing assistant
- Yannick Hardouin – acoustic bass
- Raphaël Jonin – mastering
- Gildas Lointier – engineer, programming, effects, recording
- Nikki Matheson – harmony vocals, songwriting
- Nicolas Yvan Mingot – guitar
- Frédéric Perrinet – mixing assistant
- Jacques Veneruso – songwriting, acoustic guitar, electric guitar, harmony vocals
- Gerhard Yurkovic – photography
- Le Mystère des Voix Bulgares – vocals
- David Bowie – songwriting
- Herve Teboul – songwriting, bendir, kemenche, ney, oud, tambura
- L&G Design – design
- Roland Benzi – executive producer
- Claude Gassian – photography
- Pierre Terrasson – photography
- Stéphane Reichart – recording assistant
- Fred Perrinet – recording assistant
- Nicolas Duport – recording assistant
- Thierry Chemouny – recording assistant

Credits taken from the album's liner notes.

== Charts ==
=== Weekly charts ===
Chart (1997–99)	Peak position
European Top 100 Albums (Billboard)	69
Finnish Albums (Suomen virallinen lista)	40
French Albums (SNEP)	34
Indonesian Albums (ASIRI)	1
Italian Albums (FIMI)	7
Malaysian Albums (RIM)	3
Singaporean Albums (RIAS)	1
US Heatseekers Albums (Billboard)	23

== Certifications ==
Region	Certification	Certified units/sales
France (SNEP)	Gold	100,000^{*}
Indonesia	3× Platinum	133,000
Italy (FIMI)	Gold	50,000^{*}
Malaysia	Platinum	
Singapore (RIAS)	Gold	7,500^{*}
United States	—	120,000
Summaries
Worldwide	—	2,000,000
^{*} Sales figures based on certification alone.

== Release history ==
Region	Date	Label	Edition(s)	Format(s)
France	23 June 1997	Columbia Records	Au nom de la lune	CD, cassette
Indonesia	July 1997	Sony Music Indonesia	Anggun (Indonesian edition)	CD, cassette
Japan	22 August 1997	Epic Japan	Anggun (Japanese edition)	CD, cassette
United States	26 May 1998	Epic Records	Snow on the Sahara (US edition)	CD, cassette
Canada	16 June 1998	Sony Music Canada	Snow on the Sahara (US edition)	CD, cassette
Germany	25 August 1998	Columbia Records	Snow on the Sahara	CD, cassette
United Kingdom	30 August 1999	Epic Records	Snow on the Sahara	CD, cassette
