= Believe (Cher song) =

1998 single by Cher

Single by Cher

from the album Believe
- B-side: "Strong Enough"
- Released: October 19, 1998
- Recorded: 1998
- Studio: Dreamhouse (West London)
- Genre: Eurodance; dance-pop; electropop; Europop
- Length: 3:59
- Label: Warner Bros.
- Songwriters: Brian Higgins; Stuart McLennen; Paul Barry; Steven Torch; Matthew Gray; Timothy Powell; Cher (uncredited)
- Producers: Mark Taylor; Brian Rawling

Cher singles chronology
"Paradise Is Here" (1996)	"Believe" (1998)	"Strong Enough" (1999)

Music video
- "Believe" on YouTube

"Believe" is a song by the American singer Cher from her 22nd studio album, Believe (1998). It was released as the lead single on October 19, 1998, by Warner Bros. Records. After circulating for months, a demo written by Brian Higgins, Matthew Gray, Stuart McLennen and Timothy Powell was submitted to Warner's chairman, Rob Dickins, while he was scouting for songs to include on Cher's new album. Aside from the chorus, Dickins was not impressed by the track, so he enlisted two more writers, Steve Torch and Paul Barry, to complete it. Cher contributed some lyrics but received no songwriting credit. Recording took place at Dreamhouse Studio in West London, while production was handled by Mark Taylor and Brian Rawling.

"Believe" is an upbeat dance-pop and electropop song and departed from Cher's previous music. It featured a pioneering use of the audio processing software Auto-Tune to distort her vocals, which was widely imitated and became known as the "Cher effect". The lyrics describe empowerment and self-sufficiency after a painful breakup. "Believe" received positive reviews; critics praised its production and catchiness, with some deeming it a highlight from the album. The song has been listed as one of Cher's most important releases. At the 42nd Annual Grammy Awards, it was nominated for Record of the Year and won Best Dance Recording, the first and only Grammy Award that Cher has won.

"Believe" topped the record charts in over 23 countries and has sold more than 11 million copies worldwide. It is Cher's most successful single, and one of the best-selling singles in music history. "Believe" was the biggest-selling song of 1998 in the United Kingdom, and remains the highest-selling single by a solo female artist there. In the United States, it was Cher's fifth number-one single on the Billboard Hot 100 chart, and it topped the Year-End Hot 100 singles of 1999. The accompanying music video (directed by Nigel Dick) was nominated for Best Dance Video at the 1999 MTV Video Music Awards.

Cher has performed the song on many occasions, including the 1999 Brit Awards, the Sanremo Music Festival, as well as on several talk shows and variety programs (in America and abroad). It has since become a fan favorite, and a staple in the setlist of her concert tours. "Believe" has been covered by numerous artists, and it's also been sung or referenced in several feature films and scripted TV shows. Scholars and academics noted the way in which Cher was able to re-invent herself, and yet stay true to her image, while still being able to release music that was fresh and contemporary amidst the more "teen pop"-based music of the period. They also credited the song for restoring Cher's social popularity and further cementing her position as a pop icon. "Believe" earned Cher a place in the Guinness Book of World Records, and Rolling Stone listed it among the "500 Greatest Songs of All Time".

== Background and writing ==
The origins of the song go back to as early as 1991, when the original demo of "Believe", written by singer Mark Scott and songwriter Brian Higgins and co-produced by Nick Van Eede and Kevin MacMichael (both of the band Cutting Crew) was created for Warner Records, to which Van Eede and MacMichael received modest compensation—reportedly just a bottle of whisky—for their contributions. The demo was passed on to several major artists through Higgins and eventually landed with Cher in 1997, which was rearranged with altered lyrics. This rearranged demo of "Believe", now written by Higgins, Matthew Gray, Stuart McLennen, and Timothy Powell, circulated at Warner Records for months. Higgins offered the demo to the English indie dance band Saint Etienne, who turned it down. According to the producer Mark Taylor, "everyone loved the chorus" but not the rest. The Warner chairman, Rob Dickins, asked the production house Dreamhouse to work on it; their goal was to make a dance record that would not alienate Cher fans. Two more writers, Steve Torch and Paul Barry, completed a version that Dickins and Cher were happy with.

Cher felt the song was "too whiny" and wanted to "toughen it up a bit". Feeling that "a girl can be sad in one verse, but she can't be sad in two verses", she rewrote the lyrics in the second verse to make the character more assertive: 'I need time to move on, I need love to feel strong / 'Cause I've had time to think it through and maybe I'm too good for you". In 2023, Cher said she regretted not asking for a songwriting credit.

== Recording ==
"Believe" was recorded in mid-1998 at the Dreamhouse studio operated by Metro Productions in Kingston upon Thames, London. It was assembled with Cubase on an early Power Macintosh G3, with synthesizers including a Clavia Nord Rack and an Oberheim Matrix 1000. Cher's vocals were recorded on three TASCAM DA-88 digital audio recorders with a Neumann U67 microphone.

Cher's vocals were processed using the pitch correction software Auto-Tune. Auto-Tune was designed to be used subtly to correct sharp or flat notes in vocal performances; however, Taylor used extreme settings to create unnaturally rapid corrections, thereby removing portamento, the natural slide between pitches in singing. Taylor said it was "the most nerve-wracking part of the project", as he was not sure how Cher would react. She insisted the effect remain when Warner wanted it removed. In an attempt to protect their method, the producers initially claimed it was achieved using a vocoder. The manual for Auto-Tune's fifth version describes the zero-speed setting as the "Cher effect".

== Composition ==
Critics described "Believe" as Eurodance, Europop, dance, dance-pop and electropop. It was recorded in the key of F♯ major with a tempo of 133 beats per minute. It follows a chord progression of F♯–C♯–G♯m–B–F♯–A♯m7–G♯m–D♯m, and Cher's vocals span from F♯_{3} to C♯_{5}.

In the verses, Cher's vocals are manipulated heavily with Auto-Tune. The New Yorker said this produced "a controlled version of losing control, hinting at various histrionic stations of the human voice". It was used more sparingly for the chorus, "Do you believe in life after love?", which is performed in a "a full, human-sounding voice".

"Believe"
A 15-second sample of "Believe". It is noted for its use of a sound effect on the vocals (using the then newly invented Auto-Tune software), which became known as the "Cher effect".

== Critical reception ==
Chuck Taylor from Billboard wrote that "Believe" was Cher's best song in years, writing: "Some songs are so natural, so comfortably sung, that you wonder that somebody didn't think them up decades before. With this, you'll be whirling around the floor, tapping hard on the accelerator to 'Believe,' a simple ode to those feelings that we all search out and cling to. Cher is just a prize here; even her hardy detractors will be fighting the beat on this one." The critic Robert Christgau highlighted "Believe" as the best song on the album. A reviewer from Entertainment Weekly described it as "poptronica glaze, the soon-to-be club fave" and called Cher's voice "unmistakable". Deborah Wilker from Knight Ridder said that "her electronically altered vocal" was "like nothing she's ever done".

New York Daily News described "Believe" as a "club track so caffeinated, it not only microwaved [Cher's] cold career to scorching-hot but gave dance music its biggest hit since the days of disco". They noted the song's "killer hook and amazing beat." Neil Strauss from The New York Times wrote that "the verses are rich and bittersweet, with the added gimmick of breaking up Cher's voice through an effect that makes her sound robotic. And the choruses are catchy and uplifting, with Cher wailing, 'Do you believe in life after love?' All of it bounces over a bed of 80s-style electronic pop. It is a song with a universal theme—a woman trying to convince herself that she can survive a breakup." Another editor, Jim Sullivan, called it a "hooky, defiant beat-fest".

=== Later reviews ===
In 2019, Bill Lamb from About.com declared it as a "perfect piece of dance-pop", including it in his list of "Top 10 Pop Songs of 1999". AllMusic editor Joe Viglione called "Believe" a "pop masterpiece, one of the few songs to be able to break through the impenetrable wall of late 1990s fragmented radio to permeate the consciousness of the world at large." Another editor, Michael Gallucci, gave a lukewarm review, writing that the Believe album is an "endless, and personality-free, thump session". Stopera and Galindo from BuzzFeed noted it as "iconic", featuring it in their "The 101 Greatest Dance Songs of the '90s" in 2017. Damon Albarn, frontman of the bands Blur and Gorillaz, called the song "brilliant".

In 2014, Tom Ewing from Freaky Trigger wrote that "Believe" "is a record in the "I Will Survive" mode of embattled romantic defiance – a song to make people who've lost out in love feel like they're the winners." He added that "it's remarkable that it took someone until 1998 to come up with "do you believe in life after love?", and perhaps even more remarkable that it wasn't Jim Steinman, but the genius of the song is how aggressive and righteous Cher makes it sound." Bob Waliszewski of Plugged In said that Cher "musters self-confidence to deal with a failed romance". In 2018, Dave Fawbert from ShortList described "Believe" as a "really great pop song with, as ever, an absolute powerhouse vocal performance from Cher".

== Chart performance ==
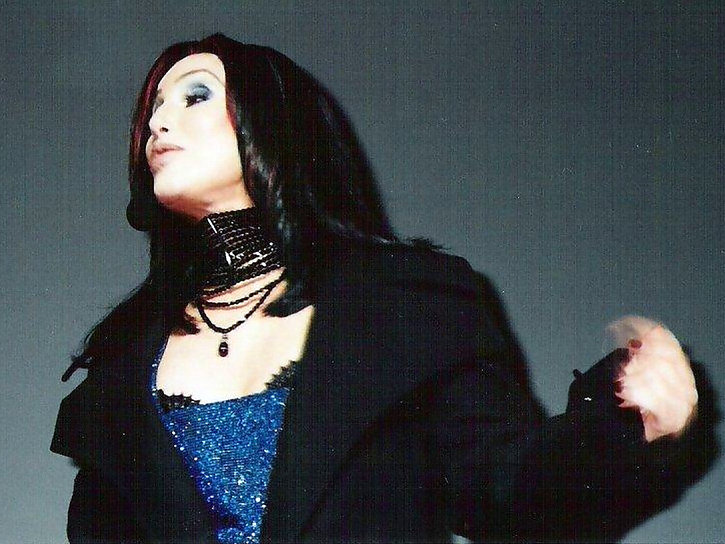
Cher performing "Believe" on the WKTU's "Miracle on 34th Street" show in New York City on December 11, 1998

"Believe" was released as the lead single from Cher's 22nd studio album, Believe (1998), on October 19, 1998. It peaked at number one in 23 countries. It debuted at number 99 on the US Billboard Hot 100 on December 19, 1998. On January 23, 1999, it reached the top 40 before reaching number one on March 13, making Cher, then aged 52, the oldest solo female artist to achieve this feat, breaking the record set by Tina Turner who was 44 when she reached No. 1 with "What's Love Got to Do With It" in 1984. (Note: Excluding Christmas/holiday-themed catalog singles like Mariah Carey's "All I Want for Christmas Is You", which most recently topped the chart when Carey was 54, and Brenda Lee's "Rockin' Around the Christmas Tree", which topped the chart when Lee was 79.) Cher also set the record for the longest span between number-one singles on the Hot 100: 33 years and 7 months between her first number-one single, "I Got You Babe", and her fifth and last, "Believe". "Believe" was ranked as the number-one song of 1999 by Billboard on both the Billboard Hot 100 and Hot Dance Club Play charts, becoming the biggest single of her entire career. "Believe" became Cher's 17th, and last, top-10 hit in the US.

"Believe" debuted at number one on the UK singles chart on October 25, 1998—for the week ending October 31, 1998—during a week in which the top five singles were all new entries, a first for the chart (not counting the first ever chart). It was Cher's fourth number one in the UK, and remained at the top of the chart for seven consecutive weeks. "Believe" was Britain's biggest-selling song of 1998, and won its writers Ivor Novello Awards for Best Selling UK Single, Best Song Musically and Lyrically, and International Hit of the Year, at the 1999 ceremony. On January 31, 2025, "Believe" was certified five-times platinum in the UK. As of October 2017, it had sold 1,830,000 copies in the UK, making it the biggest-selling song by a female artist on the UK singles chart. At 52 years old, Cher was the oldest female artist to top the UK charts, a record broken by Kate Bush in 2022, who was 63 when "Running Up That Hill" re-entered the charts and reached number one.

The success of "Believe" not only expanded through each country's singles chart, but also most countries' dance charts. In the United States "Believe" spent 15 weeks on the Billboard Hot Dance Club Play chart, five of those weeks at number one, and 22 weeks on the European Hot Dance Charts. "Believe" also set a record in 1999 after spending 21 weeks atop the Billboard Maxi-Singles Sales chart—it was still in the top 10 one year after its entry on the chart. On October 13, 2008, the song was voted number 10 on Australian VH1's Top 10 Number One Pop Songs countdown. "Believe" was nominated for Record of the Year and Best Dance Recording at 42nd Grammy Awards, the latter of which it won. Peter Rauhofer (Club 69) won the Grammy Award in 2000 for Best Remixer of the Year for his remix of Cher's "Believe".

== Music video ==
The music video for "Believe" was directed by Nigel Dick. It features Cher in a nightclub in a double role as both a singer on stage wearing a glowing headdress and a supernatural being in a cage surrounded by many people to whom she is giving advice. The video follows a woman (played by Katrine De Candole) who is in the club with her friends and sees her ex-boyfriend. Scenes are shown of her clearly disappointed when he walks away from her and then proceeds to dance and make out with another woman in her presence. The version on The Very Best of Cher: The Video Hits Collection is slightly different from the previous version (which is also included on the Mallay Believe Bonus VCD) with additional scenes towards the end that were not in the original video. There are also two "rough" versions of the video as the song was released in Europe before a video was completed. The first is a compilation of scenes from the videos of Cher's previous singles "One by One" and "Walking in Memphis" and the second includes a brief scene of the "Believe" video where Cher sings the chorus while the rest of the video is composed of scenes from "One by One".

The Billboard music critic Chuck Taylor in March 1999 graded the video a "C", praising Cher's appearance but criticizing "an unnecessary subplot about a few kids stalking each other." In Pitchfork, Simon Reynolds wrote that through the combination of cosmetic surgery, makeup and bright lights, "Cher actually looks how Auto-Tune sounds ... Her face and her voice seem to be made out of the same immaterial substance."

== Live performances ==
Cher performed the song during the Do You Believe? tour, the Farewell Tour, Cher at the Colosseum and the Dressed to Kill Tour. While she would lip-sync the entire song on various television programs, she would only lip-sync the synthesized verses when performing on her Believe and Farewell tours, the Colosseum shows and on the 2002 edition of VH1 Divas Live. Since 1999, the song has been the encore to all of Cher's concerts until her 2014 Dressed to Kill Tour, where the encore is the ballad "I Hope You Find It", a second single from her 25th studio album Closer to the Truth. It returned as the encore at her Classic Cher (2017–2020) shows and stayed in that place for the Here We Go Again Tour (2018–2020) as well.

== Legacy ==
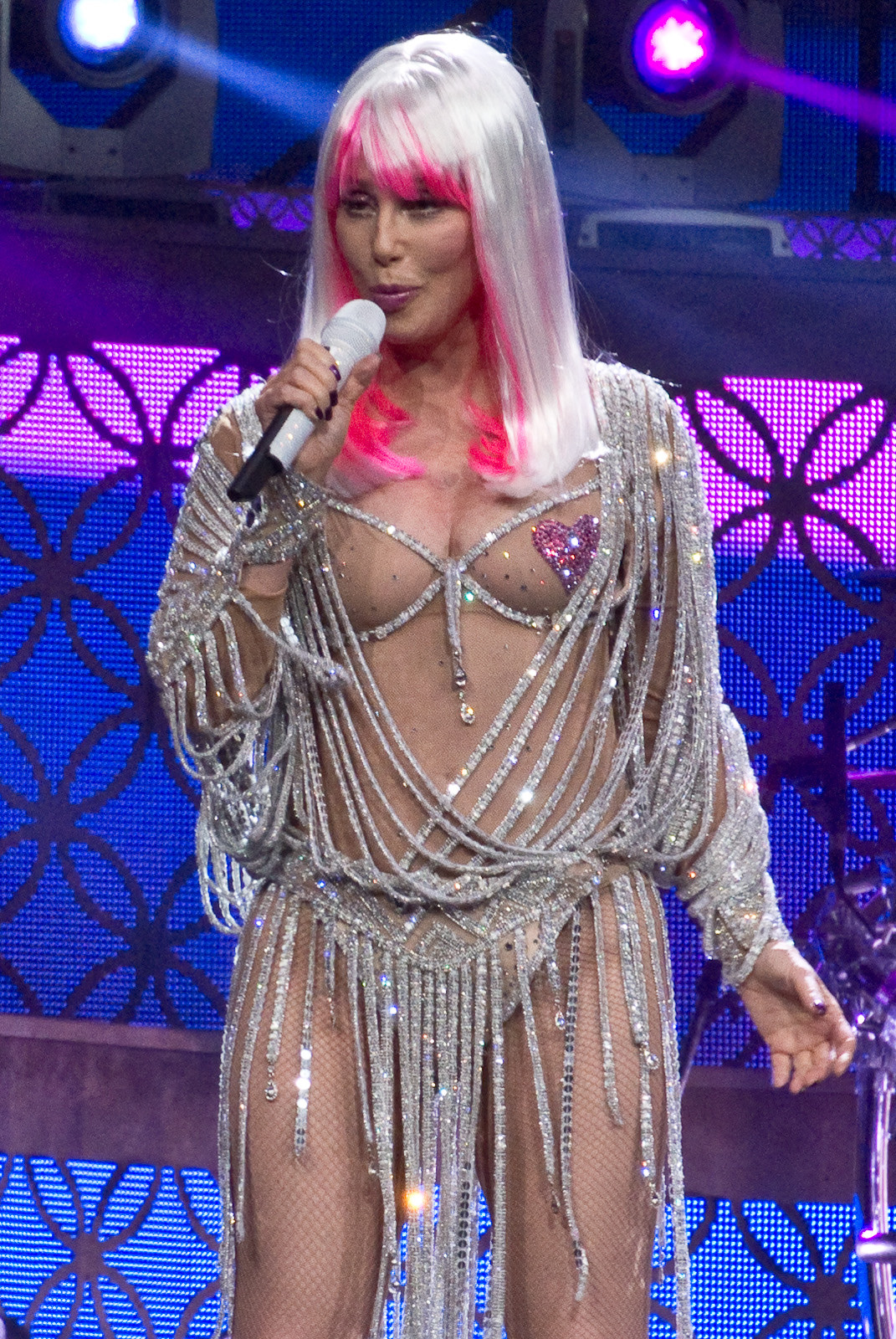
Cher performing "Believe" on the Dressed to Kill Tour in 2014

VH1 placed "Believe" at number 60 in their list of 100 Greatest Dance Songs in 2000 and at number 74 in their list of 100 Greatest Songs of the 90s in 2007. In 2003, English music journalist Paul Morley included it in his list of "Greatest Pop Single of All Time". In 2007, Rolling Stone placed "Believe" at number 10 in their list of the "20 Most Annoying Songs". In 2008, Ann Powers of the Los Angeles Times called it "the greatest disco song written after the alleged death of disco". In 2020, The Guardian ranked "Believe" as the 83rd greatest UK number one. "Believe" was placed at number 337 on the 2021 revised list of Rolling Stone's "500 Greatest Songs of All Time".

In July 2020, the digital publication The Pudding carried out a study on the most widely-known songs from the '90s and songs that are most known by Millennials and the people of Generation Z. "Believe" was the sixth song with the highest recognisability rate. In October 2023, Billboard ranked it among the "500 Best Pop Songs of All Time". In 2024, Esquire and Forbes ranked "Believe" at numbers 32 and 20 in their lists of the 50 best songs of the '90s, respectively. In June 2026, CBS News included the song in its list of the 250 essential American songs of the past 250 years.

=== Accolades ===
Accolades
Year	Publisher	Country	Accolade	Rank
1999	The Village Voice	United States	"Top Singles of the 90's"	96
2000	VH1	United States	"100 Greatest Dance Songs"	60
2005	Blender	United States	"The 500 Greatest Songs Since You Were Born"	134
2005	Bruce Pollock	United States	"The 7,500 Most Important Songs of 1944-2000"	*
2007	VH1	United States	"100 Greatest Songs of the 90s"	74
2007	Rolling Stone	United States	"20 Most Annoying Songs"	10
2012	Max	Australia	"1000 Greatest Songs of All Time"	252
2012	NME	United Kingdom	"50 Best-Selling Tracks of the '90s"	5
2015	Billboard	United States	"25 Best Catchy Songs of All Time"	17
2015	Robert Dimery	United States	"1,001 Songs You Must Hear Before You Die, and 10,001 You Must Download (2015 Update)"	*
2017	BuzzFeed	United States	"The 101 Greatest Dance Songs of the '90s"	15
2019	Billboard	United States	"Billboard's Top Songs of the '90s"	64
2019	Elle	United States	"52 Best 1990s Pop Songs"	51
2019	Insider	United States	"100 of the Best Songs from the '90s"	*
2019	Insider	United States	"102 Songs Everyone Should Listen to in Their Lifetime"	*
2019	Max	Australia	"1000 Greatest Songs of All Time"	892
2019	Paste Magazine	United States	"The Best Songs of 1999"	9
2020	Glamour	United States	"53 Best '90s Songs That Are All That and a Bag of Chips"	14
2020	The Guardian	United Kingdom	"The 100 Greatest UK No 1s"	83
2020	Cleveland.com	United States	"Best Billboard Hot 100 No. 1 Song of the 1990s"	25
2021	Rolling Stone	United States	"500 Greatest Songs of All Time"	337
2022	Pitchfork	United States	"The 250 Best Songs of the 1990s"	23
2022	Time Out	United Kingdom	"The 50 Best Gay Songs to Celebrate Pride All Year Long"	18
2023	Billboard	United States	"Best Pop Songs of All Time"	159
2024	Cosmopolitan	United States	"60 of the Best '90s Songs for the Ultimate Throwback Playlist"	55
2024	Esquire	United States	"The 50 Best Songs of the '90s"	32
2024	Forbes	United States	"The 50 Best Songs of the 1990s"	20

(*) indicates the list is unordered.

== Other versions ==
In May 2012, after successfully auditioning for The X Factor (UK), Ella Henderson, then 16 years old, performed a ballad arrangement of "Believe" after the Bootcamp round, reducing guest judge Nicole Scherzinger to tears. The cover, which was based on Adam Lambert's version performed on American Idol in 2009, was so popular for its slow tempo, emotional interpretation that Henderson released an acoustic performance in 2013 on YouTube and performed it at the National Television Awards on January 23, 2013. Henderson also included a studio version of the cover on a deluxe edition of her debut album Chapter One as part of a pre-order EP called Chapter One Sessions.

In October 2016, the Australian rock band DMA's performed "Believe" for Triple J's Like a Version. It made such an impact on the Australian audience that in the year it was performed, the cover became the highest ranked Like A Version in a Hottest 100 countdown, landing at number 6 in the 2016 edition of the countdown (this was later surpassed by The Wiggles in 2021). In 2020 it was the only Like A Version to feature in the Hottest 100 of the 2010s countdown landing at No. 41. In 2023, it topped the Triple J Hottest 100 of Like a Version countdown.

In December 2018, Lambert performed his ballad version of "Believe" again in honor of Cher during the 41st annual Kennedy Center Honors; the performance was highly acclaimed, with Cher stating that she was "at a loss for words" and was moved to tears. On December 6, 2019, Lambert released a studio version of his version of "Believe", which reached number 23 on the Billboard Digital Song Sales chart on December 21, 2019.

== Track listings ==
- US maxi-CD single
1. "Believe" (album version) – 3:59
2. "Believe" (Phat 'N' Phunky club mix) – 7:42
3. "Believe" (Club 69 Phunk club mix) – 8:55
4. "Believe" (Almighty Definitive mix) – 7:36
5. "Believe" (Xenomania Mad Tim and the Mekon club mix) – 9:15
6. "Believe" (Club 69 Future Anthem mix) – 9:20
7. "Believe" (Grip's Heartbroken mix) – 9:12
8. "Believe" (Club 69 Future Anthem dub) – 7:13
9. "Believe" (Club 69 Phunk dub) – 7:04
10. "Believe" (Phat 'N' Phunky "After Luv" dub) – 6:22
- US 7-inch, CD, and cassette single
- UK cassette single
1. "Believe" (album version) – 3:59
2. "Believe" (Xenomania mix) – 4:20
- UK and European CD1
1. "Believe" – 3:58
2. "Believe" (Almighty Definitive mix) – 7:35
3. "Believe" (Xenomania mix) – 4:20
- UK and European CD2
1. "Believe" – 3:58
2. "Believe" (Grip's Heartbroken mix) – 9:12
3. "Believe" (Club 69 Future mix) – 6:50
- European two-track CD single
1. "Believe" – 3:58
2. "Believe" (Grip's Heartbroken mix) – 9:12
- Australian maxi-CD single
1. "Believe" (Phat 'N' Phunky club mix) – 7:44
2. "Believe" (Xenomania Mad Tim and the Mekon club mix) – 9:16
3. "Believe" (Club 69 Phunk club mix) – 6:50
4. "Believe" (Club 69 Future Anthem mix) – 9:24
5. "Believe" (album version) – 3:58
- Japanese CD single
1. "Believe" – 3:58
2. "Believe" (Almighty Definitive mix) – 7:35
3. "Believe" (Grip's Heartbroken mix) – 9:12
- Japanese remix EP (with "Strong Enough")
1. "Strong Enough" (album version) – 3:44
2. "Strong Enough" (Pumpin' Dolls radio edit) – 3:48
3. "Strong Enough" (Club 69 Future Anthem mix) – 11:00
4. "Strong Enough" (Mark Andrews remix) – 7:55
5. "Believe" (album version) – 3:58
6. "Believe" (Phat 'N' Phunky club mix) – 7:44
7. "Believe" (Almighty Definitive mix) – 7:35
8. "Believe" (Club 69 Phunk club mix) – 8:55

== Personnel ==
Personnel are adapted from the Believe album liner notes and Sound on Sound.

- Cher – vocals
- Mark Taylor – producer, arranger, programming, keyboards
- Brian Rawling – production
- Brian Higgins – composition
- Stuart McLennen – composition
- Paul Barry – composition
- Steven Torch – composition
- Matthew Gray – composition
- Timothy Powell – composition
- Gipsyland – background vocals, guitar
- Robin Smith – arranger
- Adam Phillips – additional guitars
- Ryan Art – designer
- Michael Lavine – cover art photographer
- Rob Dickins – executive production

== Charts ==
=== Weekly charts ===
Weekly chart performance
Chart (1998–1999)	Peak position
Australia (ARIA)	1
Austria (Ö3 Austria Top 40)	2
Belgium (Ultratop 50 Flanders)	1
Belgium (Ultratop 50 Wallonia)	1
Brazil International (Crowley Broadcast Analysis)	6
Canada Top Singles (RPM)	1
Canada Adult Contemporary (RPM)	1
Canada Dance/Urban (RPM)	1
Canada (Nielsen SoundScan)	2
Costa Rica (Notimex)	1
Denmark (Tracklisten)	1
El Salvador (Notimex)	3
Europe (European Hot 100 Singles)	1
Finland (Suomen virallinen lista)	6
France (SNEP)	1
France Airplay (SNEP)	1
Germany (GfK)	1
Greece (IFPI)	1
Hungary (Mahasz)	1
Hungary (Rádiós Top 40)	1
Iceland (Íslenski Listinn Topp 40)	5
Ireland (IRMA)	1
Italy (FIMI)	1
Italy (Musica e dischi)	1
Italy Airplay (Music & Media)	5
Latvia (Latvijas Top 40)	1
Mexico (AMPROFON)	2
Mexico (Notitas Musicales)	1
Netherlands (Dutch Top 40)	1
Netherlands (Single Top 100)	1
Netherlands Airplay (Music & Media)	1
New Zealand (Recorded Music NZ)	1
Norway (VG-lista)	1
Poland Airplay (Music & Media)	3
Puerto Rico (Notimex)	4
Scottish Singles Sales (Official Charts)	1
Spain (AFYVE)	1
Sweden (Sverigetopplistan)	1
Switzerland (Schweizer Hitparade)	1
UK Singles (Official Charts)	1
US Billboard Hot 100	1
US Adult Contemporary (Billboard)	3
US Adult Pop Airplay (Billboard)	5
US Dance Club Songs (Billboard)	1
US Dance Singles Sales (Billboard)	1
US Pop Airplay (Billboard)	2
US Rhythmic Airplay (Billboard)	17

2008–2026 weekly chart performance
Chart (2008–2026)	Peak position
Canadian Digital Sales (Billboard)	19
CIS Airplay (TopHit)	133
Estonia Airplay (TopHit)	183
Israel International Airplay (Media Forest)	19
Kazakhstan Airplay (TopHit)	53
Norway Airplay (IFPI Norge)	63
Poland (Polish Airplay Top 100)	67
Romania Airplay (TopHit)	198
Russia Airplay (TopHit)	121
Scottish Singles Sales (Official Charts)	93
UK Dance (Official Charts)	18
UK Singles Downloads (Official Charts)	58
Ukraine Airplay (TopHit)	61
US Dance/Electronic Digital Songs (Billboard)	4

=== Year-end charts ===
1998 year-end chart performance
Chart (1998)	Position
Australia (ARIA)	43
Austria (Ö3 Austria Top 40)	16
Belgium (Ultratop 50 Flanders)	4
Belgium (Ultratop 50 Wallonia)	19
Europe (Eurochart Hot 100)	14
France (SNEP)	24
Germany (Media Control)	13
Italy (Musica e dischi)	1
Latvia (Latvijas Top 40)	8
Netherlands (Dutch Top 40)	82
Netherlands (Single Top 100)	53
Norway Christmas Period (VG-lista)	2
Sweden (Hitlistan)	6
Switzerland (Schweizer Hitparade)	18
Taiwan (Hito Radio)	95
UK Singles (OCC)	1

1999 year-end chart performance
Chart (1999)	Position
Australia (ARIA)	6
Austria (Ö3 Austria Top 40)	21
Belgium (Ultratop 50 Flanders)	48
Belgium (Ultratop 50 Wallonia)	25
Brazil (Crowley)	25
Canada Top Singles (RPM)	13
Canada Adult Contemporary (RPM)	4
Canada Dance (RPM)	9
Europe (Eurochart Hot 100)	4
France (SNEP)	13
Germany (Media Control)	16
Japan (Tokio Hot 100)	6
Latvia (Latvijas Top 197)	12
Netherlands (Dutch Top 40)	9
Netherlands (Single Top 100)	7
Norway Winter Period (VG-lista)	6
Sweden (Hitlistan)	52
Switzerland (Schweizer Hitparade)	8
UK Singles (OCC)	124
US Billboard Hot 100	1
US Adult Contemporary (Billboard)	9
US Adult Top 40 (Billboard)	18
US Dance Club Play (Billboard)	1
US Mainstream Top 40 (Billboard)	13
US Maxi-Singles Sales (Billboard)	1
US Rhythmic Top 40 (Billboard)	52
US Top 40 Tracks (Billboard)	10

2000 year-end chart performance
Chart (2000)	Position
US Maxi-Singles Sales (Billboard)	22

=== Decade-end charts ===
Decade-end chart performance
Chart (1990–1999)	Position
Austria (Ö3 Austria Top 40)	86
Belgium (Ultratop 50 Flanders)	29
Ireland (IRMA)	31
Netherlands (Dutch Top 40)	17
UK Singles (OCC)	5
US Billboard Hot 100	31

=== All-time charts ===
All-time chart performance
Chart	Position
UK Singles (OCC)	17

== Certifications and sales ==
Certifications and sales
Region	Certification	Certified units/sales
Australia (ARIA)	3× Platinum	210,000^{^}
Austria (IFPI Austria)	Platinum	50,000^{*}
Belgium (BRMA)	3× Platinum	150,000^{*}
Denmark (IFPI Danmark)	Platinum	90,000^{‡}
France (SNEP)	Diamond	750,000^{*}
Germany (BVMI)	5× Gold	1,250,000^{^}
Italy	—	100,000
Italy (FIMI) since 2009	Gold	25,000^{‡}
Netherlands (NVPI)	Platinum	75,000^{^}
New Zealand (RMNZ)	Gold	5,000^{*}
New Zealand (RMNZ) digital	2× Platinum	60,000^{‡}
Norway (IFPI Norway)	2× Platinum	
Spain (Promusicae)	Platinum	60,000^{‡}
Sweden (GLF)	3× Platinum	90,000^{^}
Switzerland (IFPI Switzerland)	Platinum	50,000^{^}
United Kingdom (BPI)	5× Platinum	3,000,000^{‡}
United States (RIAA)	Platinum	1,800,000
Summaries
Worldwide	—	11,000,000
^{*} Sales figures based on certification alone.^{^} Shipments figures based on certification alone.^{‡} Sales+streaming figures based on certification alone.

== Release history ==
Release history and formats
Region	Date	Format(s)	Label(s)	Ref.
United Kingdom	October 19, 1998	CD; cassette	Warner Bros.	
United States	November 10, 1998	Rhythmic contemporary; contemporary hit radio	Warner Bros.	
United States	1998	Maxi-CD	Warner Bros.	
United States	January 1999	7-inch vinyl; CD; cassette	Warner Bros.	
Japan	January 15, 1999	CD	Warner Bros.	
Canada	January 19, 1999	CD	Warner Bros.	
Japan	April 21, 1999	Remix EP	Warner Bros.	

== See also ==
- List of number-one singles in Australia during the 1990s
- List of Ultratop 50 number-one hits of 1998 (Belgium)
- List of Ultratop 40 number-one hits of 1999 (Belgium)
- List of number-one singles of 1999 (Canada)
- List of number-one hits of 1998 (Denmark)
- List of number-one hits of 1999 (Denmark)
- List of European number-one hits of 1998
- List of European number-one hits of 1999
- List of number-one singles of 1999 (France)
- List of number-one hits of 1998 (Germany)
- List of number-one hits of 1998 (Italy)
- List of number-one hits of 1999 (Italy)
- List of number-one singles of 1999 (Netherlands)
- List of number-one singles of 1998 (Norway)
- List of number-one singles of 1998 (Spain)
- List of number-one singles of 1999 (Spain)
- List of number-one singles of 2005 (Sweden)
- List of number-one singles of the 1990s (Switzerland)
- List of UK Singles Chart number ones of the 1990s
- List of Billboard Hot 100 number-one singles of 1999
- List of number-one dance singles of 1998 (U.S.)
- List of number-one dance singles of 1999 (U.S.)
