= List of Dutch Top 40 number-one singles of 1999 =

These hits topped the Dutch Top 40 in 1999 (see 1999 in music).

| Issue date | Artist | Song |
|---|---|---|
| 2 January | Emilia | Big Big World |
| 9 January | Emilia | Big Big World |
| 16 January | Cher | Believe |
| 23 January | The Offspring | Pretty Fly (for a White Guy) |
| 30 January | The Offspring | Pretty Fly (for a White Guy) |
| 6 February | The Offspring | Pretty Fly (for a White Guy) |
| 13 February | 2pac | Changes |
| 20 February | 2pac | Changes |
| 27 February | 2pac | Changes |
| 6 March | Britney Spears | ...Baby One More Time |
| 13 March | Britney Spears | ...Baby One More Time |
| 20 March | DJ Jean | The Launch |
| 27 March | DJ Jean | The Launch |
| 3 April | Britney Spears | ...Baby One More Time |
| 10 April | Britney Spears | ...Baby One More Time |
| 17 April | Vengaboys | We're Going to Ibiza |
| 24 April | Vengaboys | We're Going to Ibiza |
| 1 May | Vengaboys | We're Going to Ibiza |
| 8 May | Backstreet Boys | I Want It That Way |
| 15 May | Backstreet Boys | I Want It That Way |
| 22 May | Backstreet Boys | I Want It That Way |
| 29 May | Backstreet Boys | I Want It That Way |
| 5 June | Toy-Box | Best Friend |
| 12 June | Toy-Box | Best Friend |
| 19 June | Toy-Box | Best Friend |
| 26 June | Toy-Box | Best Friend |
| 3 July | Britney Spears | Sometimes |
| 10 July | Britney Spears | Sometimes |
| 17 July | Jennifer Lopez | If You Had My Love |
| 24 July | Lou Bega | Mambo No. 5 (A Little Bit Of...) |
| 31 July | Lou Bega | Mambo No. 5 (A Little Bit Of...) |
| 7 August | Lou Bega | Mambo No. 5 (A Little Bit Of...) |
| 14 August | Lou Bega | Mambo No. 5 (A Little Bit Of...) |
| 21 August | Eiffel 65 | Blue (Da Ba Dee) |
| 28 August | Eiffel 65 | Blue (Da Ba Dee) |
| 4 September | Eiffel 65 | Blue (Da Ba Dee) |
| 11 September | Eiffel 65 | Blue (Da Ba Dee) |
| 18 September | Eiffel 65 | Blue (Da Ba Dee) |
| 25 September | City to City | The road ahead (Miles of the unknown) |
| 2 October | City to City | The road ahead (Miles of the unknown) |
| 9 October | City to City | The road ahead (Miles of the unknown) |
| 16 October | City to City | The road ahead (Miles of the unknown) |
| 23 October | R. Kelly | If I Could Turn Back the Hands of Time |
| 30 October | R. Kelly | If I Could Turn Back the Hands of Time |
| 6 November | R. Kelly | If I Could Turn Back the Hands of Time |
| 13 November | R. Kelly | If I Could Turn Back the Hands of Time |
| 20 November | R. Kelly | If I Could Turn Back the Hands of Time |
| 27 November | R. Kelly | If I Could Turn Back the Hands of Time |
| 4 December | R. Kelly | If I Could Turn Back the Hands of Time |
| 11 December | R. Kelly | If I Could Turn Back the Hands of Time |
| 18 December | Def Rhymz | Doekoe |
| 25 December | Marco Borsato | Binnen |

== See also ==
- 1999 in music
