= List of number-one hits of 1998 (Denmark) =

This is a list of the Danish Singles Chart number-one hits of 1998 from the International Federation of the Phonographic Industry and Nielsen Soundscan. They were provided through Billboard magazine under the "Hits of the World" section.

== Chart history ==
| Issue date | Song | Artist |
|---|---|---|
| 1 January | "Candle In The Wind 1997"/"Something About The Way You Look Tonight" | Elton John |
| 8 January | "Candle In The Wind 1997"/"Something About The Way You Look Tonight" | Elton John |
| 15 January | "Torn | Natalie Imbruglia |
| 22 January | "Torn" | Natalie Imbruglia |
| 29 January | "Torn" | Natalie Imbruglia |
| 5 February | "Torn" | Natalie Imbruglia |
| 12 February | "Torn" | Natalie Imbruglia |
| 19 February | "It's Like That" | Run-D.M.C. vs. Jason Nevins |
| 26 February | "It's Like That" | Run-D.M.C. vs. Jason Nevins |
| 5 March | "It's Like That" | Run-D.M.C. vs. Jason Nevins |
| 12 March | "It's Like That" | Run-D.M.C. vs. Jason Nevins |
| 19 March | "It's Like That" | Run-D.M.C. vs. Jason Nevins |
| 26 March | "It's Like That" | Run-D.M.C. vs. Jason Nevins |
| 2 April | "It's Like That" | Run-D.M.C. vs. Jason Nevins |
| 9 April | "My Heart Will Go On" | Celine Dion |
| 16 April | "My Heart Will Go On" | Celine Dion |
| 23 April | "My Heart Will Go On" | Celine Dion |
| 30 April | "My Heart Will Go On" | Celine Dion |
| 7 May | "My Heart Will Go On" | Celine Dion |
| 14 May | "My Heart Will Go On" | Celine Dion |
| 21 May | "Space Invaders" | Hit'n'Hide |
| 28 May | "Space Invaders" | Hit'n'Hide |
| 4 June | "Space Invaders" | Hit'n'Hide |
| 11 June | "Space Invaders" | Hit'n'Hide |
| 18 June | "Space Invaders" | Hit'n'Hide |
| 25 June | "Space Invaders" | Hit'n'Hide |
| 7 July | "Ghetto Supastar (That Is What You Are)" | Pras featuring ODB & introducing Mýa |
| 14 July | "Ghetto Supastar (That Is What You Are)" | Pras featuring ODB & introducing Mýa |
| 21 July | "Vill Ha Dig" | Drömhus |
| 23 July | "Vill Ha Dig" | Drömhus |
| 30 July | "Vill Ha Dig" | Drömhus |
| 6 August | "Vill Ha Dig" | Drömhus |
| 13 August | "Vill Ha Dig" | Drömhus |
| 20 August | "Vill Ha Dig" | Drömhus |
| 27 August | "Vill Ha Dig" | Drömhus |
| 3 September | "Vill Ha Dig" | Drömhus |
| 10 September | "Vill Ha Dig" | Drömhus |
| 17 September | "Only When I Lose Myself" | Depeche Mode |
| 24 September | "Kalinka" | Infernal |
| 1 October | "Kalinka" | Infernal |
| 8 October | "Kalinka" | Infernal |
| 15 October | "Kalinka" | Infernal |
| 22 October | "Kalinka" | Infernal |
| 29 October | "No Matter What" | Boyzone |
| 3 November | "No Matter What" | Boyzone |
| 10 November | "Believe" | Cher |
| 17 November | "Believe" | Cher |
| 24 November | "Believe" | Cher |
| 30 November | "Believe" | Cher |
| 8 December | "Believe" | Cher |
| 15 December | "Believe" | Cher |
| 22 December | "Believe" | Cher |
| 29 December | "Believe" | Cher |

== See also ==
- 1998 in music
