= List of number-one hits of 1999 (Italy) =

The list of number-one singles of 1999 in Italy includes all the songs that reached the top spot on the weekly chart compiled by the Federazione Industria Musicale Italiana (FIMI).

== Chart history ==
Week	Single	Artist(s)	Ref.
1	"Believe"	Cher	
2	"Believe"	Cher	
3	"Believe"	Cher	
4	"Believe"	Cher	
5	"Believe"	Cher	
6	"Pretty Fly (For a White Guy)"	The Offspring	
7	"Pretty Fly (For a White Guy)"	The Offspring	
8	"Pretty Fly (For a White Guy)"	The Offspring	
9	"Pretty Fly (For a White Guy)"	The Offspring	
10	"Oggi sono io"	Alex Britti	
11	"...Baby One More Time"	Britney Spears	
12	"Snow on the Sahara"	Anggun	
13	"...Baby One More Time"	Britney Spears	
14	"...Baby One More Time"	Britney Spears	
15	"Flat Beat"	Mr. Oizo	
16	"Snow on the Sahara"	Anggun	
17	"Per te"	Jovanotti	
18	"I Want It That Way"	Backstreet Boys	
19	"I Want It That Way"	Backstreet Boys	
20	"I Want It That Way"	Backstreet Boys	
21	"I Want It That Way"	Backstreet Boys	
22	"I Want It That Way"	Backstreet Boys	
23	"Beautiful Stranger"	Madonna	
24	"Unforgivable Sinner"	Lene Marlin	
25	"Il mio nome è mai più"	Liga-Jova-Pelù	
26	"Il mio nome è mai più"	Liga-Jova-Pelù	
27	"Il mio nome è mai più"	Liga-Jova-Pelù	
28	"Il mio nome è mai più"	Liga-Jova-Pelù	
29	"Il mio nome è mai più"	Liga-Jova-Pelù	
30	"Il mio nome è mai più"	Liga-Jova-Pelù	
31	"Il mio nome è mai più"	Liga-Jova-Pelù	
32	"Il mio nome è mai più"	Liga-Jova-Pelù	
33	"Il mio nome è mai più"	Liga-Jova-Pelù	
34	"Il mio nome è mai più"	Liga-Jova-Pelù	
35	"Il mio nome è mai più"	Liga-Jova-Pelù	
36	"Il mio nome è mai più"	Liga-Jova-Pelù	
37	"Il mio nome è mai più"	Liga-Jova-Pelù	
38	"Il mio nome è mai più"	Liga-Jova-Pelù	
39	"Il mio nome è mai più"	Liga-Jova-Pelù	
40	"Il mio nome è mai più"	Liga-Jova-Pelù	
41	"New Day"	Wyclef Jean featuring Bono	
42	"Il mio nome è mai più"	Liga-Jova-Pelù	
43	"50 special"	Lùnapop	
44	"50 special"	Lùnapop	
45	"Keep On Movin'"	Five	
46	"La fine del millennio"	Vasco Rossi	
47	"La fine del millennio"	Vasco Rossi	
48	"La fine del millennio"	Vasco Rossi	
49	"La fine del millennio"	Vasco Rossi	
50	"La fine del millennio"	Vasco Rossi	
51	"La fine del millennio"	Vasco Rossi	
52	"La fine del millennio"	Vasco Rossi	
