= List of number-one hits of 1999 (Austria) =

This is a list of the Austrian Singles Chart number-one hits of 1999.

Issue date	Song	Artist
3 January	"Big Big World"	Emilia
10 January	"Big Big World"	Emilia
17 January	"Big Big World"	Emilia
24 January	"Big Big World"	Emilia
31 January	"Narcotic"	Liquido
7 February	"Narcotic"	Liquido
14 February	"Narcotic"	Liquido
21 February	"Narcotic"	Liquido
28 February	"A klana Indiana"	A klana Indiana
7 March	"A klana Indiana"	A klana Indiana
14 March	"A klana Indiana"	A klana Indiana
21 March	"...Baby One More Time"	Britney Spears
28 March	"...Baby One More Time"	Britney Spears
4 April	"...Baby One More Time"	Britney Spears
11 April	"...Baby One More Time"	Britney Spears
18 April	"...Baby One More Time"	Britney Spears
25 April	"...Baby One More Time"	Britney Spears
2 May	"...Baby One More Time"	Britney Spears
9 May	"...Baby One More Time"	Britney Spears
16 May	"I Want It That Way"	Backstreet Boys
23 May	"I Want It That Way"	Backstreet Boys
30 May	"I Want It That Way"	Backstreet Boys
6 June	"Uiii, is des bled!"	A klana Indiana
13 June	"Uiii, is des bled!"	A klana Indiana
20 June	"Mambo No. 5"	Lou Bega
27 June	"Mambo No. 5"	Lou Bega
4 July	"Mambo No. 5"	Lou Bega
11 July	"Mambo No. 5"	Lou Bega
18 July	"Mambo No. 5"	Lou Bega
25 July	"Mambo No. 5"	Lou Bega
1 August	"Mambo No. 5"	Lou Bega
8 August	"Mambo No. 5"	Lou Bega
15 August	"Mambo No. 5"	Lou Bega
22 August	"Mambo No. 5"	Lou Bega
29 August	"Blue (Da Ba Dee)"	Eiffel 65
5 September	"Blue (Da Ba Dee)"	Eiffel 65
12 September	"Blue (Da Ba Dee)"	Eiffel 65
19 September	"Blue (Da Ba Dee)"	Eiffel 65
26 September	"Blue (Da Ba Dee)"	Eiffel 65
3 October	"Blue (Da Ba Dee)"	Eiffel 65
10 October	"Genie in a Bottle"	Christina Aguilera
17 October	"Genie in a Bottle"	Christina Aguilera
24 October	"Genie in a Bottle"	Christina Aguilera
31 October	"Genie in a Bottle"	Christina Aguilera
7 November	"Vater unser"	E Nomine
14 November	"Vater unser"	E Nomine
21 November	"Vater unser"	E Nomine
28 November	"So bist du (und wenn Du gehst...)"	Oli.P
5 December	"So bist du (und wenn Du gehst...)"	Oli.P
12 December	"So bist du (und wenn Du gehst...)"	Oli.P
19 December	"Maschen-Draht-Zaun"	Stefan Raab
26 December	"Maschen-Draht-Zaun"	Stefan Raab

== See also ==
- 1999 in music
