= ...Baby One More Time =

1998 single by Britney Spears

Single by Britney Spears

from the album ...Baby One More Time
- B-side: "Autumn Goodbye"
- Released: September 29, 1998
- Studio: Cheiron (Stockholm)
- Genre: Teen pop; dance-pop
- Length: 3:30
- Label: Jive
- Songwriter: Max Martin
- Producers: Max Martin; Rami Yacoub

Britney Spears singles chronology
"...Baby One More Time" (1998)	"Sometimes" (1999)

Music video
- "...Baby One More Time" on YouTube

"...Baby One More Time" is the debut single by the American singer Britney Spears, from her 1999 debut album of the same name. It was written by Max Martin and produced by Martin and Rami Yacoub. Released as Spears' debut single on September 29, 1998, by Jive Records, it topped the charts in over 20 countries. It was certified quintuple platinum in the US and triple platinum in the UK, and was the UK's best-selling single of 1999. A teen pop and dance-pop song about longing for the return of an ex-boyfriend, "...Baby One More Time" is one of the best-selling singles of all time, with over 10 million copies sold.

The music video, directed by Nigel Dick, features Spears as a student who sings and dance around a high school, while watching her love interest from afar. In 2010, the music video was voted the third most influential in the history of popular music in a poll held by Jam!. In 2011, it was voted the best video of the 1990s by Billboard.

"...Baby One More Time" has been featured on all of her greatest hits and other compilation albums. In 2020, Rolling Stone named it the greatest debut single of all time. In 2021, the song was ranked at number 205 on the list of Rolling Stone's 500 Greatest Songs of All Time.

Spears has performed "...Baby One More Time" in a number of live appearances and during all of her concert tours. It was nominated for Best Female Pop Vocal Performance at the 42nd Annual Grammy Awards (2000), and has been included in lists by Blender, Rolling Stone and VH1. It has been noted for redefining the sound of late 1990s music. Spears named it one of her favorite songs. It was also the final song to be played on the BBC music programme Top of the Pops in the 1990s.

== Background ==
In June 1997, Britney Spears was in talks with manager Lou Pearlman to join female pop group Innosense. Her mother Lynne Spears asked family friend and entertainment lawyer Larry Rudolph for his opinion and submitted a tape of Spears singing over a Whitney Houston karaoke song along with some pictures. Rudolph decided he wanted to pitch her to record labels, therefore she needed a professional demo. He sent Spears an unused song from Toni Braxton; she rehearsed for a week and recorded her vocals in a studio with a sound engineer. Spears traveled to New York with the demo and met with executives from four labels, returning to her hometown of Kentwood, Louisiana the same day. Three of the labels rejected her, arguing audiences wanted pop bands such as the Backstreet Boys and the Spice Girls, and "there wasn't going to be another Madonna, another Debbie Gibson, or another Tiffany." Two weeks later, executives from Jive Records returned calls to Rudolph. Senior vice president of A&R Jeff Fenster stated about Spears' audition that "It's very rare to hear someone that age who can deliver emotional content and commercial appeal. [...] For any artist, the motivation—the 'eye of the tiger'—is extremely important. And Britney had that." They appointed her to work with producer Eric Foster White for a month, who reportedly shaped her voice from "lower and less poppy" delivery to "distinctively, unmistakably Britney." After hearing the recorded material, president Clive Calder ordered a full album. Spears had originally envisioned "Sheryl Crow music, but younger more adult contemporary" but felt all right with her label's appointment of producers, since "It made more sense to go pop, because I can dance to it—it's more me."

I had been in studio for about six months listening and recording material, but I hadn't really heard a hit yet. When I started working with Max Martin in Sweden, he played the demo for 'Baby One More Time' for me, and I knew from the start it [was one] of those songs you want to hear again and again. It just felt really right. I went into the studio and did my own thing with it, trying to give it a little more attitude than the demo. In 10 days, I never even saw Sweden. We were so busy.

— Britney Spears, talking to Chuck Taylor, Billboard

Fenster asked producer Max Martin to meet Spears in New York, after which he returned to Sweden to write her a handful of songs with long-term collaborator Denniz Pop. Pop was ill, so Martin asked producer Rami Yacoub to help. When six songs were ready, Spears flew to Cheiron Studios in Stockholm, Sweden, where half of the album was recorded in May 1998, nominally produced by Martin, Pop and Yacoub. Pop, however, was too ill to attend any of the recording sessions, and Spears never met him. In his place, Martin was the acting producer.

Martin showed Spears and her management a track titled "Hit Me Baby One More Time", which was originally written for American boy band Backstreet Boys and the R&B girl group TLC, but they both rejected it. The label thought the song would work for the English group Five, but they also passed on it. Spears later said that she felt excited when she heard it and knew it was going to be a hit record. Jive A&R man Steve Lunt recalled, "We at Jive said, 'This is a fuckin' smash'"; but other executives were concerned that the line "Hit Me" would condone domestic violence. The title was revised to "...Baby One More Time".

Spears recorded her vocals for the song in May 1998 at Cheiron Studios. She stayed up late the night before listening to Soft Cell's "Tainted Love" ("What a sexy song") to get the growl she wanted: "I wanted my voice to be kind of rusty." Spears revealed that she "didn't do well at all the first day in the studio [recording the song], I was just too nervous. So I went out that night and had some fun. The next day I was completely relaxed and nailed it. You gotta be relaxed singing '... Baby One More Time'." The song was produced by Martin and Rami, and was also mixed by Martin at Cheiron Studios. Thomas Lindberg played the guitar, while Johan Carlberg played the bass guitar. Background vocals were provided by Spears, Martin and Nana Hedin. Denniz Pop was credited as producer even though he was not present for the recording or mixing. Spears also recorded a track called "Autumn Goodbye", written and produced by Eric Foster White, that was released as a B-side to "...Baby One More Time". "Autumn Goodbye" was recorded in 1998 at 4MW East Studios in New Jersey.

"...Baby One More Time" was released by Jive as Spears' debut single on September 29, 1998, when she was only 16 years old. Spears said "...Baby One More Time" was one of her favorite songs in her entire catalog, naming "Toxic" and "He About to Lose Me" as the other two.

== Music and lyrics ==
"...Baby One More Time"
A 20-second sample of the song's chorus, features Spears singing "Hit me, baby, one more time!"

"...Baby One More Time" is a teen pop and dance-pop song that lasts three minutes and thirty seconds. The song is composed in the key of C minor and is set in the time signature of 4/4 common time with a moderate tempo of 93 beats per minute. Songwriting and production is largely based on previous Cheiron productions, most notably Robyn's "Show Me Love", which shows similar song scheme, drum patterns, wah guitars and piano hits. Spears' vocal range spans over one octave from E♭_{3} to C_{5}. The song begins with a three-note motif in the bass range of the piano, an opening that has been compared to many other songs, such as "We Will Rock You" (1977), "Start Me Up" (1981), and the theme song of the 1975 film Jaws due to the fact the track "makes its presence known in exactly one second". According to magazine Blender, "...Baby One More Time" is composed by "wah-wah guitar lines and EKG-machine bass-slaps".

Claudia Mitchell and Jacqueline Reid-Walsh, authors of Girl Culture: Studying girl culture: a readers' guide (2008), noted the lyrics of the song "gesture toward [Spears] longing for the return of an ex-boyfriend." Spears said "...Baby One More Time" is a song "every girl can relate to. She regrets it. She wants him back." The lyrics, however, caused controversy in the United States, because the line "Hit me baby one more time" supposedly has sadomasochistic connotations. As a response, the singer said the line "doesn't mean physically hit me. [...] It means just give me a sign, basically. I think it's kind of funny that people would actually think that's what it meant." Music journalist John Seabrook said it was misinterpreted as an allusion to domestic violence when Martin may have wanted to say something like "hit me up on the phone one more time" but erred due to his then imperfect English.

== Critical reception ==
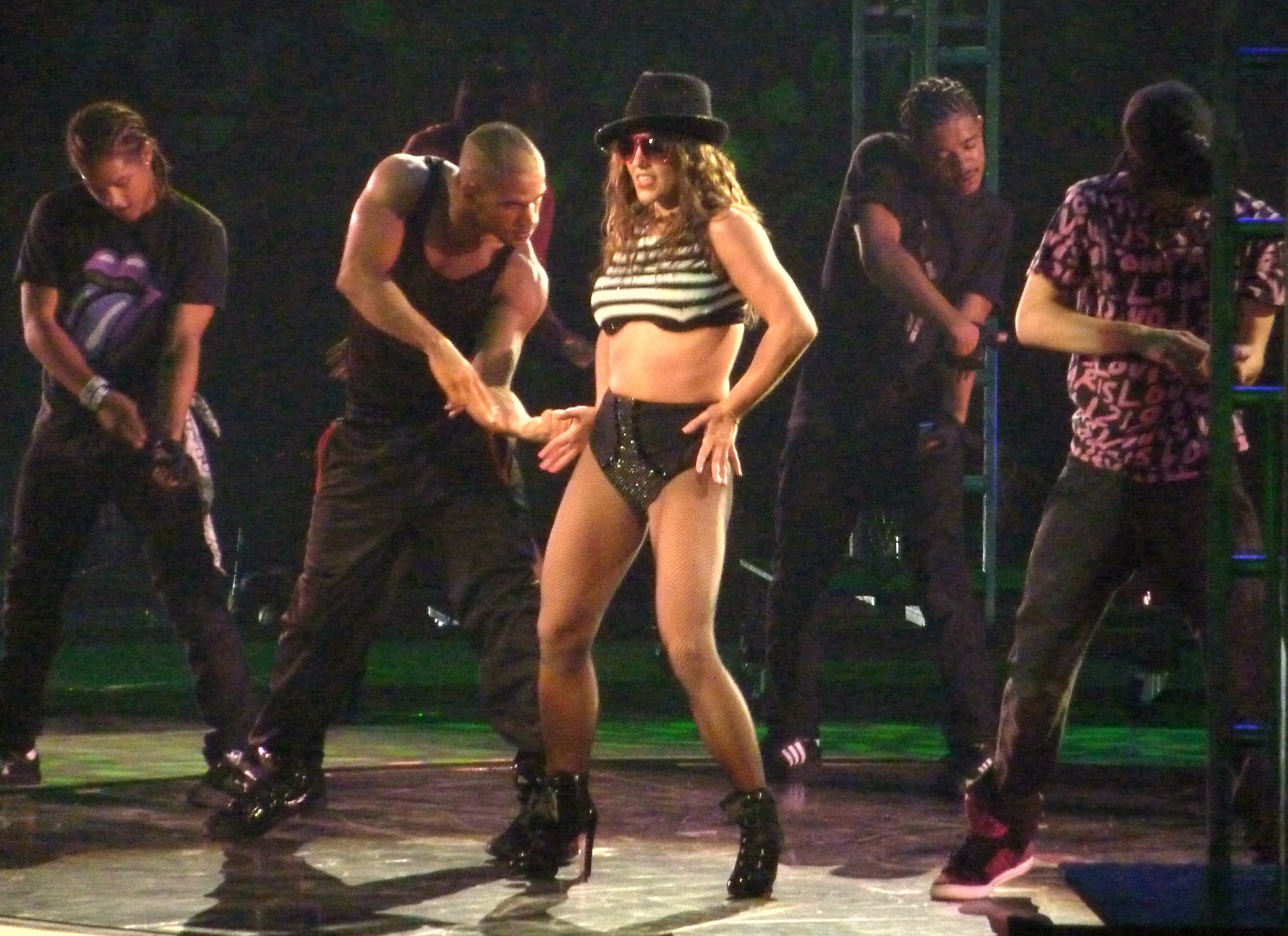
Spears and some of her dancers performing "...Baby One More Time" during The Circus Starring Britney Spears in 2009

Marc Oxoby, author of The 1990s (2003), noted the song "was derided as vapid by some critics, yet tapped into the same kind of audience to whom the Spice Girls music appealed, young teens and pre-teens." Amanda Murray of Sputnikmusic commented, "[" ... Baby One More Time" is] well-composed, tightly arranged, and even with Spears' vocal limitations it goes straight for the proverbial pop jugular." She also said that the song was a highlight in the pop music genre and added, "There is little doubt that '...Baby One More Time' will be long remembered as one of the cornerstones of pop music in general, and it is a strong front-runner as the prototype for the late 90s pop resurgence." Bill Lamb of About.com considered "...Baby One More Time" as Spears' best song, saying, "the song is full of hooks and a big mainstream pop sound. The accompanying schoolgirl video caused a sensation, and, when the single hit No. 1, Britney was assured of stardom." In a list compiled by Sara Anderson of AOL Radio, "...Baby One More Time" was ranked sixth in a list of Spears' best songs. She noted the singer "somehow made the school girl outfit and pink pom-pom hair-ties trendy again, worn by every tween in the succeeding years."

Larry Flick of Billboard wrote, "Produced by famed Euro-popsters Max Martin and Eric Foster, "Baby, One More Time" chugs with an insinuating faux-funk beat and super-shiny synths. Spears has a charming kewpie-doll voice that has a soulful quality that leaves the listener intrigued and wondering where she'll go with time and experience." Beth Johnson of Entertainment Weekly called it a "candy-pop-with-a-funky-edge smash", while Stephen Thomas Erlewine of AllMusic said the song was "ingenious", Brian Raftery of Blender called it "a perfectly fine, slickly conceived pop tune. [..] At the time, teen-pop was still a boys' club, but while the guys were crooning about crushes, Spears was already planning the sleep-over party". In 2009, Jody Rosen of Rolling Stone called it "some of the best radio pop of the past decade-plus". NME considered "...Baby One More Time" "incredible", commenting that "it's a symphony of teenage lust as fully realised as anything Brian Wilson ever wrote—a truly grand pop song that overwhelms any lingering undercurrent of Lolita paedo-creepiness through the sheer fanatical earnestness of its delivery." "...Baby One More Time" won a Teen Choice Award for Single of the Year at the 1999 Teen Choice Awards and an MTV Europe Music Award for Best Song at the 1999 MTV Europe Music Awards.

== Commercial performance ==
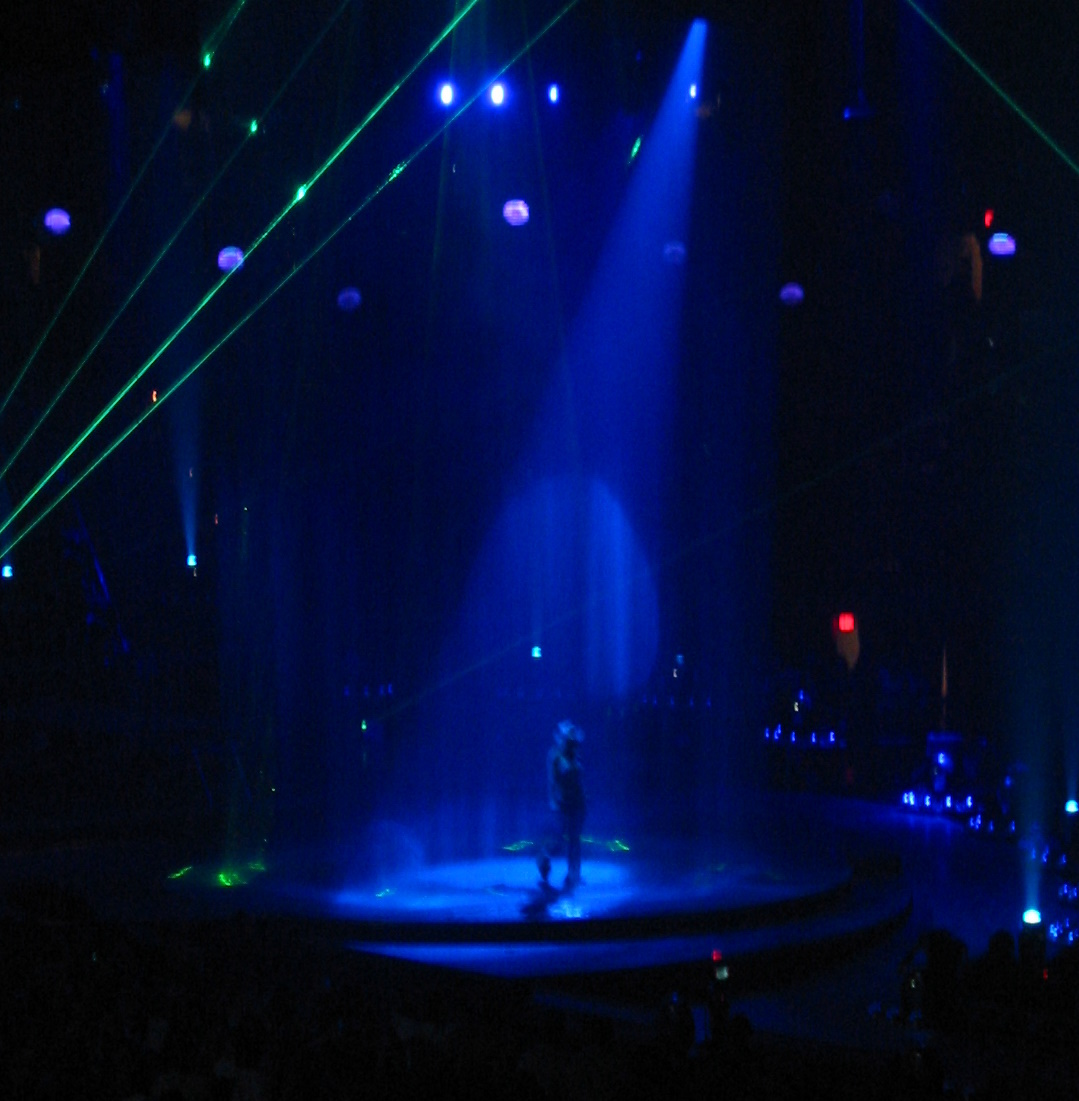
The encore performance of "...Baby One More Time" during the Dream Within a Dream Tour, with Spears standing in the water screen, 2001

The song was officially sent to contemporary hit and rhythmic contemporary radio on September 29, 1998. On November 21, 1998, "...Baby One More Time" debuted on the Billboard Hot 100 at number 17 and topped the chart two and a half months later for two consecutive weeks, replacing R&B singer Brandy's "Have You Ever?". Simultaneously, it climbed to number one on the Canadian Singles Chart. The song reached the top spot of the Hot 100 Singles Sales and stayed there for four consecutive weeks. This eventually propelled the single to a platinum certification by the Recording Industry Association of America. Though not as strong as its sales tallies, "...Baby One More Time" also experienced considerable airplay, becoming her first top ten hit on the Hot 100 Airplay, peaking at number eight. The single also became an all-around hit on Top 40 radio, going top ten on both the Top 40 Tracks and Rhythmic Top 40, and to number one for five weeks on the Mainstream Top 40. It spent 32 weeks on the Hot 100 and ended up at number five on Billboard's year-end chart. As of June 2012, "...Baby One More Time" has sold 1,412,000 physical singles, with 511,000 paid digital downloads in the United States. It is Spears' best-selling physical single in the country. "...Baby One More Time" debuted on January 31, 1999, at number 20 on the Australian Singles Chart, a month later reached number one and stayed there for nine consecutive weeks. The song eventually became the second highest-selling single of the year, only behind Lou Bega's "Mambo No. 5", and was certified three-times platinum by the Australian Recording Industry Association for selling over 210,000 copies. In New Zealand, the single spent four non-consecutive weeks at the top of the charts and after shipping over 15,000 units to retailers the Recording Industry Association of New Zealand certified it platinum.

The track reached the top spot in the majority of countries in which it charted. "...Baby One More Time" spent two consecutive weeks at number-one on the French Singles Chart and was certified platinum by the Syndicat National de l'Édition Phonographique after selling over 500,000 units in the country. Additionally, the song topped the German Singles Chart for six consecutive weeks and sold over 750,000 copies, resulting in a three-times gold certification by the International Federation of the Phonographic Industry. In the United Kingdom, according to Jive Records, "...Baby One More Time" sold more than 250,000 copies in a mere three days after its February 1999 release. Spears broke a first-week sales record for a female act in the UK at the time when "...Baby One More Time" sold a total of 460,000 copies. Eventually, the British Phonographic Industry certified it two-times platinum on March 26, 1999. The single went on to sell over 1,445,000 units by the end of 1999, making it the highest-selling single of that year and the 8th biggest song of the 1990s. As of 2018, it is the 32nd best-seller of all time in the UK. The song has sold two million units in the country as of August 2022. Additionally, "...Baby One More Time" is the fifth best-selling single by a female artist in the country, behind Cher's "Believe", Whitney Houston's "I Will Always Love You", Adele's "Someone like You" and Céline Dion's "My Heart Will Go On". "...Baby One More Time" is one of the best-selling singles of all time, with over 10 million copies sold worldwide. As of May 2020, "...Baby One More Time" has generated over 285 million streams in the US.

== Music video ==
=== Background ===
The music video was directed by Nigel Dick. After being chosen, Dick received criticism from his colleagues about wanting to work with Spears. He responded saying, "It's a great song. I don't know anything about Britney. I never watched The Mickey Mouse Club. She seems like a great kid and she's very enthusiastic, but I just love the song. It's just a great song". The video's original setup was very different from what eventually became the final product. The plan was to have the video in a cartoon-like environment, a likely attempt to attract an audience of younger children. Spears was unhappy with this, and argued that she wanted her video to reflect the lives of her fans and wanted to set the video in a school. Spears pitched this idea to Dick, and explained she wanted the video to have dance scenes. The original setting was scrapped and replaced with Spears' concept. Dick's first idea for the wardrobe was jeans and a T-shirt, but during the wardrobe fitting Spears asked for a schoolgirl outfit. Dick said that "Every piece of wardrobe in the video came from Kmart, and I was told at the time not one piece of clothing in the video cost more than $17. On that level, it's real. That probably, in retrospect, is a part of its charm." The knotted shirt was Spears' idea, she recollects, saying, "The outfits looked kind of dorky, so I was like, 'Let's tie up our shirts and be cute'". About the experience of shooting her first music video, Spears said, "It was a wonderful experience. All these people there, working for you. I had my own trailer. It was an amazing experience". The music video was shot on August 7 and 8, 1998, at Venice High School, the same school used to shoot the 1978 film Grease. The video premiered on MTV and other video stations on November 26, 1998.

=== Synopsis ===
Spears wearing the schoolgirl outfit in the song's music video

The video begins with Spears appearing bored in class at high school. Her assistant Felicia Culotta played the role of Spears' teacher. When the bell rings, Spears runs out into the hall and begins a choreographed dance in the corridor. After this, Spears is outside, now adorned in a pink athletic outfit, and seen in a car. Along with a couple of other students, she performs a number of gymnastic moves before heading back inside. She is then sitting on the bleachers in the gymnasium watching a basketball game, and she dances in the gymnasium. Her love interest is revealed sitting close to her, played by her real-life cousin Chad.

=== Reception ===
The schoolgirl outfit is considered to be one of Spears' most iconic looks as well as amongst the hallmarks of pop culture. It is on display at the Hard Rock Hotel and Casino in Las Vegas, Nevada. The ensemble caused controversy among parents associations for showing the midriff of a sixteen-year-old. Spears faced the criticism saying, "Me showing my belly? I'm from the South; you're stupid if you don't wear a sports bra [when you] go to dance class, you're going to be sweating your butt off." In 1999, "...Baby One More Time" earned Spears her first three MTV Video Music Award nominations, in the categories of Best Pop Video, Best Choreography, and Best Female Video at the 1999 MTV Video Music Awards. In a list compiled by VH1 in 2001, it was listed at number ninety in the best videos of all time. The video was the first of fourteen of her videos to retire on MTV's television series Total Request Live (TRL). On its final episode, a three-hour special aired on November 16, 2008, "...Baby One More Time" was number one in their final countdown as the most iconic music video of all time and was the last video to be played on the show. Wesley Yang in his essay "Inside the Box" in n+1, compared the music video to Britny Fox's "Girlschool" because it featured "a classroom full of Catholic schoolgirls gyrating to the beat in defiance of a stern teacher. [..] But that was a sexist video by a horrible hair metal band that exploited women. Britney Spears was something else—an inflection point in the culture". The music video is also referenced in the video for Spears' 2009 single, "If U Seek Amy". After Spears comes out of her house dressed as a housewife, her daughter is dressed with a similar schoolgirl outfit while wearing pink ribbons in her hair. The video was ranked at number four on a list of the ten most controversial music videos in pop by AOL on September 29, 2011. Rolling Stone placed "...Baby One More Time" at number 30 on its list of the 100 greatest music videos of all time.

== Live performances ==
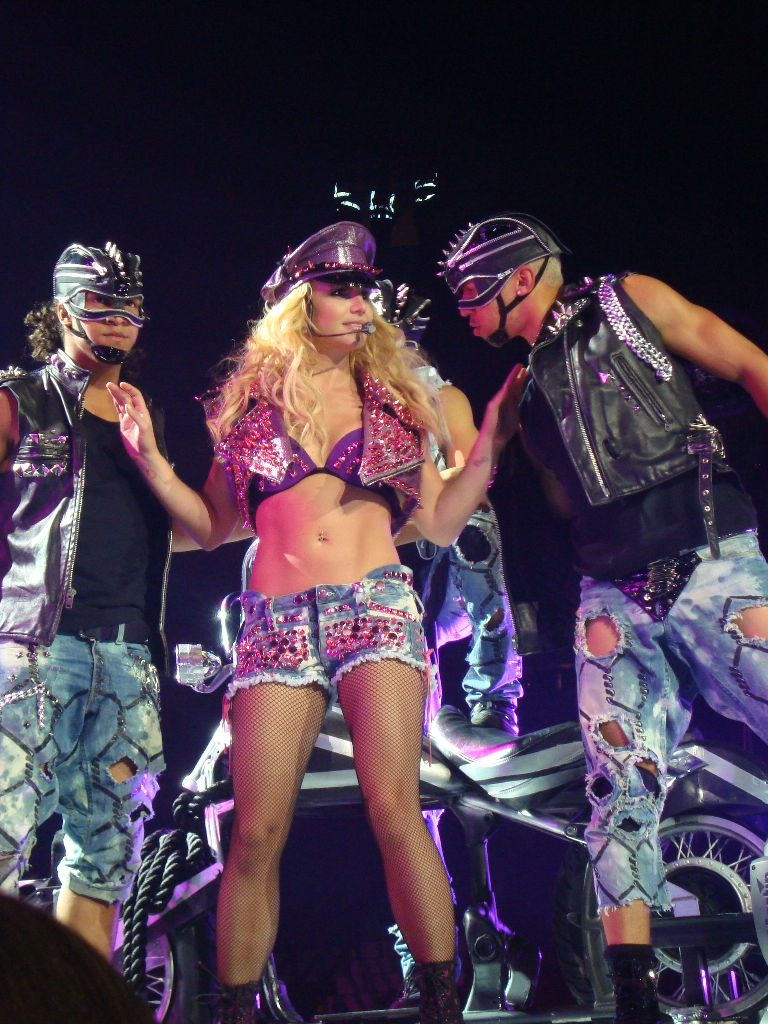
Spears and some of her dancers performing "...Baby One More Time" during the Femme Fatale Tour, 2011

The first live performance of the song was at the Singapore Jazz Festival in Singapore on May 16, 1998. That day, Spears also performed the song "Sometimes" for the first time. Spears performed "...Baby One More Time" on several occasions. She performed the song on July 6, 1999, during her appearance in Bethel, New York at the original site of Woodstock. Neil Strauss, from The New York Times, noted that "all the backing music was on tape, and most of the vocals were recorded, with Ms. Spears just reinforcing selected words in choruses and singing an occasional snippet of a verse". It was also performed at the 1999 MTV Video Music Awards; after a classroom roll call ended, Spears appeared on the stage and began performing the song. Halfway through, she was joined by Justin Timberlake and the members of NSYNC for a dance routine. Afterwards, the band performed their hit "Tearin' Up My Heart". The song was also performed at the 1999 MTV Europe Music Awards, along with "(You Drive Me) Crazy", the 1999 Billboard Music Awards, the 1999 Smash Hits Poll Winners Party, the Christmas Day edition of Top of the Pops and the Greenwich Millennium concert on December 31, 1999. She also performed it with broadcasters David Dimbleby and Michael Buerk on 2000 Today. Spears performed the song in a medley with "From the Bottom of My Broken Heart" at the 42nd Grammy Awards. Spears was wearing a turtleneck and a full tulle skirt at the beginning of the performance, while dancers surrounded her with enormous hand fans. After singing a shortened version of the song, she then took a few moments to shuffle into a form-fitting red rhinestone outfit (with side cutouts) and emerged onto a stage to perform "...Baby One More Time." Spears was also criticized of lipsynching the song during her performance. Later, in 2003, Spears performed the song in a remixed form at Britney Spears: In the Zone, a concert special that aired in ABC on November 17, 2003. "...Baby One More Time" was also performed at the 2003 NFL Kickoff Live on September 4, 2003, at the National Mall, in a medley with "I'm a Slave 4 U" (2001), which included pyrotechnics. She sported shoulder-length blond hair and was dressed in black football pants, a black-and-white referee halter top and boots from Reebok. Her outfit was later auctioned off to benefit the Britney Spears Foundation.

"...Baby One More Time" has been performed in seven of Spears' concert tours since its release. On 1999's ...Baby One More Time Tour, the encore consisted of a performance of the song, in which Spears wore a black bra under pink halter, a pink sequined plaid mini-skirt, and black thigh-high stockings. On 2000's Oops!... I Did It Again Tour, "...Baby One More Time" was performed after a dance interlude in which the dancers showed their individual moves while their names appeared on the screens. Spears took the stage in a conservative schoolgirl outfit to perform the song. She ripped it off halfway through the song to reveal a cheerleader ensemble. The song was also the encore of 2001's Dream Within a Dream Tour. It began with a giant projection of a hologram of Spears onto a water screen. The projection gradually shrank until Spears rose from the stage while wearing a plastic cowboy hat, blue hip-huggers, and a matching bra top. She began performing "...Baby One More Time" in a ballad version until reaching the end of the runway. Pyrotechnics surrounded the stage while the song changed to a more uptempo version with elements of techno.

On The Onyx Hotel Tour, after performing "Showdown", a video interlude followed featuring Spears and her friends outside a club. While she was leaving, she noticed a woman dressed in 1930s fashion. She followed her and the woman asked Spears to enter the "Mystic Lounge". Spears reappeared wearing a corset to perform "...Baby One More Time" along with "Oops!...I Did It Again" and "(You Drive Me) Crazy". All of the three were reworked for the show with elements of jazz and blues. "...Baby One More Time" was also performed on the promotional tour made on some House of Blues locations, called The M+M's Tour. The show started with Spears singing a short version of the song dressed in a white go-go boots, a white miniskirt and a sparkling pink bikini top. On The Circus Starring Britney Spears, the song made into the Electro Circ act. It was the final song of the act, performed after "Toxic". The performance consisted on Spears and her dancers performing a remix of the song. On 2011's Femme Fatale Tour, "...Baby One More Time" was performed in a medley with the remix of Rihanna's "S&M" (2010). At Spears' residency show Britney: Piece of Me in Las Vegas, the song was included on its setlist.

== Cover versions, samples and usage in media ==
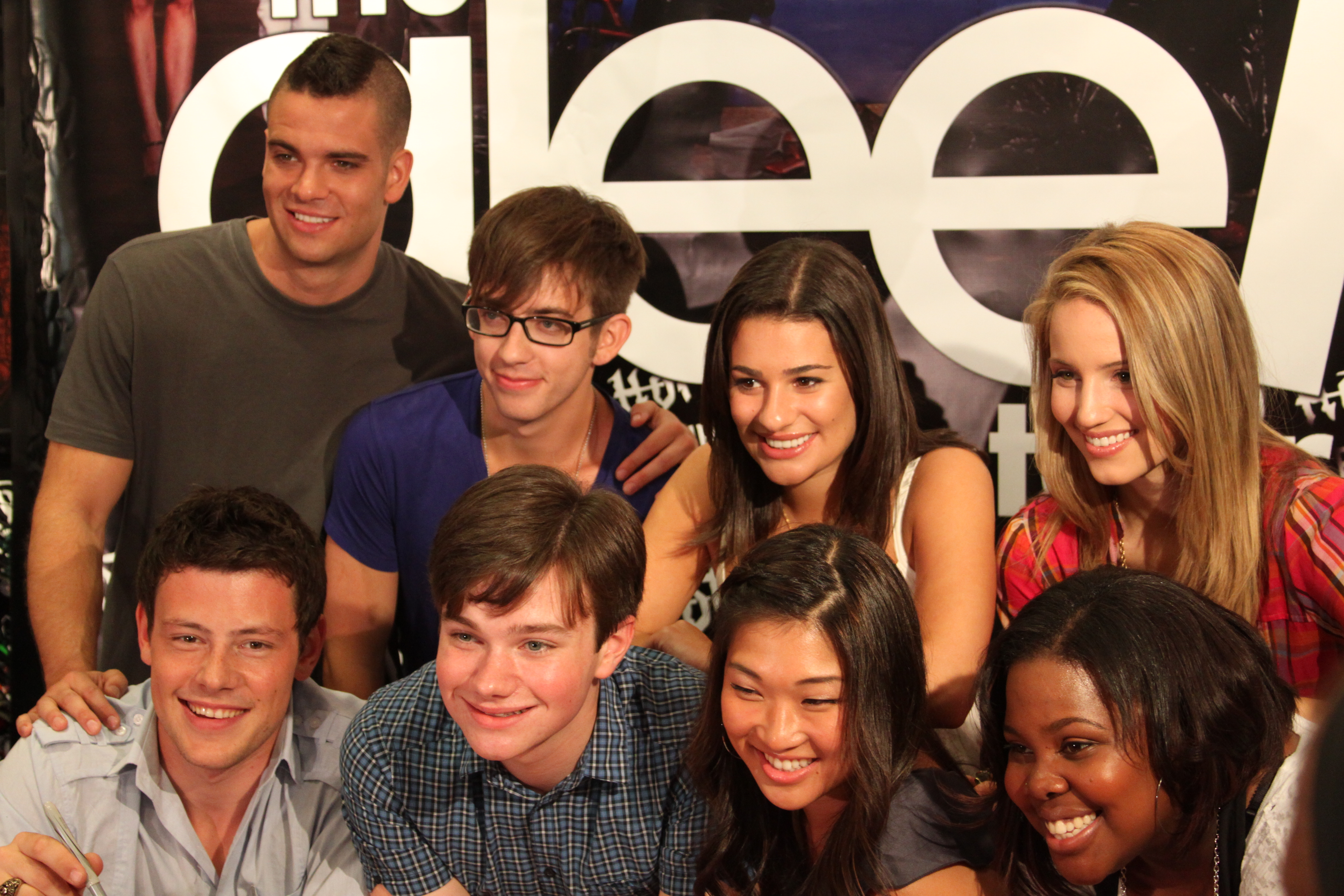
Lea Michele from the cast of Glee covered the song in the episode "Britney/Brittany". The episode featured an appearance made by Spears herself.

"...Baby One More Time" has been covered on numerous occasions. One of the earliest live covers of the song was by the Scottish band Travis, recorded during one of their concerts in Robin Hood's Bay, North Yorkshire, England. The song was later included in the release of their 1999 single, "Turn". Lead singer Francis Healey said, "We did it for a laugh the first time. [..] And as we played it, the irony slipped from my smile. It's a very well-crafted song. It [has] that magic thing." The Guardian said this cover showed a new and more "dark" side of the band, commenting "slowed down to a mournful crawl, it was amazing how ominous the couplet "This loneliness is killing me / Hit me, baby, one more time" sounded". PopWreckoning.com called it "perhaps the most well done cover of Britney's catalyst to eternal fame". Spears heard their version while shopping in a mall and said, "It was so weird. I liked it though, I thought it was cool. It was a very different vibe from what I did". In July 2005, the Dresden Dolls performed a cover during their summer concerts while opening for Panic! at the Disco. On July 18, 2006, frontman Brendon Urie joined the band to perform the song in Pittsburgh, Pennsylvania. PopWreckoning.com said the cover was "a strange twist to this pop ditty. It's obviously darker and actually tortured as opposed to Britney's school girl despair".

On July 13, 2009, Tori Amos covered the song live during her Sinful Attraction Tour at the Paramount Theatre in Oakland, California. On October 15, that year, Kris Allen covered the song for the first time at a concert in Seton High School in Cincinnati, Ohio. His rendition received positive reviews. The song is heard, prominently but briefly, during the climactic fight-scene in the 2005 animated film Robots. Fender Pinwheeler (voiced by Robin Williams), while wearing a skirt, was busy fighting to the beat of the song. An excerpt was used in the comedy film, but was not included on the soundtrack album. In 2000, British death metal cover band Ten Masked Men included a rendition of the song on their Return of the Ten Masked Men album. A cover by Ahmet and Dweezil Zappa was featured in the soundtrack of the 2000 film Ready to Rumble. The song was covered twice in Fearless Records' Punk Goes... compilation album series, first by pop punk band Nicotine for 2002's Punk Goes Pop and then by metalcore band August Burns Red for its 2009 successor, Punk Goes Pop Volume Two. In 2003, the song was covered by American pop punk band Bowling for Soup for the soundtrack of the film Freaky Friday and commented that their version was "really, really, dark and really rock, [..] not the kind of 'pop'-py stuff that we usually do." In 2005, power pop band Fountains of Wayne covered the song for their compilation album Out-of-State Plates. Robert Christgau of The Village Voice highlighted their rendition saying the song is "as redolent and fetching as any of [Fountains of Wayne]'s peaks". A cover of the song by Windy Wagner was featured in the 2011 dance video game by Ubisoft, Just Dance 3.

In the 2010 Glee season 2 episode "Britney/Brittany", the character of Rachel Berry, played by Lea Michele, covered the song using similar outfits to the ones of the music video. Spears also made a cameo, taking the teacher's role, previously played by Cullota. In the 2010 Nickelodeon film, The Boy Who Cried Werewolf, the song was featured in the end credits performed by the actors as their respective characters. Darren Criss also of Glee performed a mash-up of "...Baby One More Time" with "Für Elise" on Sing Out, Raise Hope for The Trevor Project and the Elizabeth Glaser Pediatric AIDS Foundation in December 2011. In 2012, British singer Ed Sheeran performed an acoustic version of the song on NOW 100.5 FM. A year later he covered it on Z100's Elvis Duran and the Morning Show and added a rap verse. The song is sung by actresses Selena Gomez, Vanessa Hudgens, Ashley Benson and Rachel Korine in Harmony Korine's film Spring Breakers. Swedish singer Tove Styrke released a cover of the song on July 24, 2015. Charli XCX and Troye Sivan referenced the song on their single "1999" on XCX's album Charli. Alternative rock band Slothrust recorded a cover of the song as part of their 2017 EP Show Me How You Want It to Be. Anne Marie also references the song on her single "2002". The music video also pays homage to Spears. Both singles were released in 2018. In 2020, Italian symphonic death metal band Fleshgod Apocalypse paid homage to the song in their single "No", slightly interpolating the chorus lines and melody near the end of the track with altered lyrics.

In 2018, the sitcom Superstore also used "Baby, One More Time" in season 4, episode 2, "Baby Shower", during a scene of Amy Sosa (America Ferrera)'s baby shower. In addition, the song was also used in the trailer of Hitman's Wife's Bodyguard in 2021. In 2022, the song was re-versioned for the Mexican Netflix television series Rebelde. It was performed by Brazilian actress Giovanna Grigio and Mexican actor Alejandro Puente and was included in the soundtrack of the series released on January 5, 2022, by Sony Music Mexico.

On Broadway, the song has appeared in two different jukebox musicals: & Juliet, the 2019 musical using the songs of Max Martin, in which the song is performed by Juliet Capulet; and Once Upon a One More Time, the 2021 fairytale comedy that uses many of Spears' songs, in which it is the opening number.

A rock cover of the song by Tenacious D is featured in the end credits of the 2024 animated film Kung Fu Panda 4, which stars Tenacious D frontman Jack Black in the titular role of Po.

In 2025, South Korean singer Seulgi sampled the guitar riffs from the song, for her comeback single "Baby, Not Baby". In 2025 American singer Addison Rae sampled the song in a mashup with her 2023 single I Got It Bad during her The Addison Tour and continued to use the mashup through her 2026 festival performances.

== Legacy ==
"One of those pop manifestos that announces a new sound, a new era, a new century. But most of all, a new star. [...] '...Baby One More Time' is an apocalyptic thunder-clap of a song, with Max Martin's mega-boom production [...]. In the great tradition of debut singles, it was a divisive statement that drew a line between past and future. [...] With '...Baby One More Time,' [Spears] changed the sound of pop forever."

— Rolling Stone's Rob Sheffield commenting on the song's impact.

In 2020, Rolling Stone ranked the song at number one on a list of the 100 Greatest Debut Singles of All Time. In 2021, the same magazine ranked the song at number 205 on their updated list of 500 Greatest Songs of All Time. Billboard's Robert Kelly observed that Spears' "sexy and coy" vocals on the track "kicked off a new era of pop vocal stylings that would influence countless artists to come." "...Baby One More Time" was listed at number twenty five in the greatest pop songs since 1963, in a list compiled by Rolling Stone and MTV in 2000. Blender listed it at number nine in the 500 Greatest Songs Since You Were Born. The song was also listed as the 2nd best song of the 1990s by VH1 and in a listing compiled in 2003, ranked at number one in 100 Best Songs of the Past 25 Years. Bill Lamb of About.com ranked "...Baby One More Time" at number one on a compiled list with the Top 40 Pop Songs Of All Time. The music video was voted the third most influential promo in the history of pop music on a poll held by Jam!. "...Baby One More Time" is also one of the best-selling singles of all time, with over 9 million copies sold, and also earned Spears' first nomination for a Grammy Award for Best Female Pop Vocal Performance. In April 2005, the British TV network ITV aired a short series called Hit Me, Baby, One More Time hosted by Vernon Kay. The show pitted one-hit wonders who generally had their moments of fame in the 1980s against each other to play their own hits and a currently popular cover song. The favorites were chosen by audience voting. The American version of the show also aired on NBC later in the year, and it was also hosted by Kay. In the 2012 poll created by The Official Charts Company and ITV to discover The Nation's Favourite Number 1 Single of all time, "...Baby One More Time" was listed as the seventh favorite song by the United Kingdom. In 2021, Billboard and American Songwriter both ranked the song number two on their lists of the greatest Britney Spears songs.

Spears led the teen pop pack of Christina Aguilera, Jessica Simpson and Mandy Moore, who were all seen as "pop princesses" gaining chart success in 1999. These four performers had each been developing material in 1998, but "...Baby One More Time" changed the market in December, opening the door for the others. Rolling Stone wrote that Spears "spearheaded the rise of post-millennial teen pop ... Spears early on cultivated a mixture of innocence and experience that generated lots of cash". Barbara Ellen of The Observer has reported: "Spears is famously one of the 'oldest' teenagers pop has ever produced, almost middle aged in terms of focus and determination. Many 19-year-olds haven't even started working by that age, whereas Britney, a former Mouseketeer, was that most unusual and volatile of American phenomena—a child with a full-time career. While other little girls were putting posters on their walls, Britney was wanting to be the poster on the wall. Whereas other children develop at their own pace, Britney was developing at a pace set by the ferociously competitive American entertainment industry".

Scott Plagenhoef of Pitchfork noted: "songs like Nirvana's "Smells Like Teen Spirit", Dr. Dre's "Nuthin' But a 'G' Thang", and Britney Spears' " ... Baby One More Time" altered the landscape of pop culture so quickly in large part because they were delivered to all corners of the U.S. simultaneously by MTV. ... MTV's ability to place a song and musician into the pop music conversation was unparalleled at the time, and by the end of the decade that meant absurd levels of both financial and creative commitment to music videos." PopMatters's writer Evan Sawdey commented that Spears' concept for the song's music video was the one responsible for her immediate success, saying that, as a result, the singer "scored a massive No. 1 single, inadvertently started the late '90s teen pop boom, and created a public persona for herself that was simultaneously kid-friendly and pure male fantasy. Her videos got played on both MTV and the Disney Channel at the same time, showing just how well Spears (and her armies of PR handlers) managed to walk that fine line between family-friendly pop idol and unabashed sex object."

=== Accolades ===
Accolades for "...Baby One More Time"
Award	Year	Category	Result	Ref(s).
ASCAP	2000	Most Performed Song	Won	
APRA Music Awards	2000	Most Performed Foreign Work	Nominated	
Billboard Music Awards	1999	Female Singles Artist of the Year	Won	
CDDB Awards	1999	Most Played Single on Computers	Won	
Grammy Awards	2000	Best Female Pop Vocal Performance	Nominated	
Guinness World Records	2000	Fastest Most No.1 Singles on UK chart by a Teenage Female Solo Artist	Won	
Indonesia Music Choice Awards	1999	Best Pop Song	Won	
Indonesia Music Choice Awards	1999	Best Song	Nominated	
Indonesia Music Choice Awards	1999	Best Music Video	Won	
J-Wave Awards	1999	Song of the Year	Nominated	
M6 Awards	1999	Best Song	Won	
March Music Madness Awards	2014	Greatest Pop Song of the Modern Era	Won	
MTV Europe Music Awards	1999	Best Song	Won	
MTV Europe Music Awards	1999	Best Pop	Won	
MTV Video Music Awards	1999	Best Pop Video	Nominated	
MTV Video Music Awards	1999	Best Choreography	Nominated	
MTV Video Music Awards	1999	Best Female Video	Nominated	
MTV Video Music Awards	1999	International Viewer's Choice	Nominated	
Now That's What I Call Music!	2018	Best Song of NOW Years (1983–2018)	Won	
Now That's What I Call Music!	2018	Best Song of the 90s	Won	
Radio Music Awards	1999	Song of the Year: Contemporary Hit Radio/Hot Adult Contemporary	Nominated	
Teen Choice Awards	1999	Choice Single	Won	
Teen Choice Awards	1999	Choice Music Video	Nominated	
The Record of the Year	1999	The Record of the Year	Won	
TRL Awards	2007	Most Influential Video of All Time	Won	
Vevo Certified Awards	2014	Vevo Certified Awards for 100 Million Views	Won	

== Formats and track listings ==
- French CD single; US and UK cassette single
1. "...Baby One More Time" – 3:30
2. "Autumn Goodbye" – 3:41
- Australian CD maxi single
1. "...Baby One More Time" (Radio Version) – 3:30
2. "...Baby One More Time" (Instrumental) – 3:30
3. "Autumn Goodbye" – 3:41
4. "...Baby One More Time" (Davidson Ospina Club Mix) – 5:40
5. "...Baby One More Time" (Video)
- European CD maxi single
1. "...Baby One More Time" (Radio Version) – 3:30
2. "...Baby One More Time" (Instrumental) – 3:30
3. "Autumn Goodbye" – 3:41
4. "...Baby One More Time" (Davidson Ospina Club Mix) – 5:40
5. "Britney's Spoken Introduction" (Video) – 0:14
6. "No Doubt (Snippet)" (Video) – 1:15
- Brazilian and Malaysian CD maxi single
1. "...Baby One More Time" (Radio Version) – 3:30
2. "...Baby One More Time" (Instrumental) – 3:30
3. "Autumn Goodbye" – 3:41
4. "...Baby One More Time" (Davidson Ospina Club Mix) – 5:40
- US CD maxi single
1. "...Baby One More Time" (Radio Version) – 3:30
2. "Autumn Goodbye" – 3:41
3. "No Doubt (Preview)"
4. "...Baby One More Time (Choreography Rehearsal)" (Video)
5. "No Doubt" (Video)
- UK CD maxi single 1; Israel CD maxi single
1. "...Baby One More Time" (Original Version) – 3:30
2. "...Baby One More Time" (Sharp Platinum Vocal Remix) – 8:11
3. "...Baby One More Time" (Davidson Ospina Club Mix) – 5:40
- UK CD maxi single 2
1. "...Baby One More Time" (Radio Version) – 3:30
2. "...Baby One More Time" (Instrumental) – 3:30
3. "Autumn Goodbye" – 3:41
- Australian cassette single
1. "...Baby One More Time" (Original Version) – 3:30
2. "...Baby One More Time" (Davidson Ospina Club Mix) – 5:40
- 12-inch vinyl
1. "...Baby One More Time" (Davidson Ospina Club Mix) – 5:40
2. "...Baby One More Time" (Davidson Ospina Chronicles Dub) – 6:30
3. "...Baby One More Time" (LP Version) – 3:30
4. "...Baby One More Time" (Sharp Platinum Vocal Remix) – 8:11
5. "...Baby One More Time" (Sharp Trade Dub) – 6:50
- Digital download – Digital 45
1. "...Baby One More Time" – 3:31
2. "Autumn Goodbye" – 3:41
- 4-inch vinyl (2025)
1. "...Baby One More Time" - 3:31
2. "Oops!... I Did It Again" - 3:32

== Credits and personnel ==
Credits for "...Baby One More Time" and "Autumn Goodbye" are taken from the single's liner notes.

"...Baby One More Time"

- Britney Spears – vocals and background vocals
- Max Martin – producer, lyrics, composition, arrangement, recording, person audio mixing, background vocals
- Rami Yacoub – producer, arrangement, recording, audio mixing
- Denniz Pop – executive producer
- Nana Hedin – background vocals
- Thomas Lindberg – bass guitar
- Johan Carlberg – guitar
- Tom Coyne – mastering

"Autumn Goodbye"

- Britney Spears – lead vocals and background vocals
- Eric Foster White – songwriting, producer, audio mixing, all instruments
- Nikki Gregoroff – background vocals
- Tom Coyne – mastering

== Charts ==
=== Weekly charts ===
Weekly chart performance
Chart (1998–1999)	Peak position
Australia (ARIA)	1
Austria (Ö3 Austria Top 40)	1
Belgium (Ultratop 50 Flanders)	1
Belgium (Ultratop 50 Wallonia)	1
Canada (Nielsen SoundScan)	1
Canada Top Singles (RPM)	1
Canada Adult Contemporary (RPM)	4
Canada Dance/Urban (RPM)	2
Costa Rica (Notimex)	5
Denmark (Tracklisten)	1
European Hot 100 Singles (Music & Media)	1
European Radio Top 50 (Music & Media)	1
El Salvador (Notimex)	1
Finland (Suomen virallinen lista)	1
France (SNEP)	1
France Airplay (Music & Media)	1
Germany (GfK)	1
Greece (IFPI)	1
Honduras (Notimex)	4
Hungary (MAHASZ)	4
Hungary (Rádiós Top 40)	1
Iceland (Íslenski Listinn Topp 40)	11
Ireland (IRMA)	1
Italy (Musica e dischi)	1
Italy Airplay (Music & Media)	1
Netherlands (Dutch Top 40)	1
Netherlands (Single Top 100)	1
New Zealand (Recorded Music NZ)	1
Norway (VG-lista)	1
Puerto Rico (Notimex)	5
Poland Airplay (Music & Media)	9
Scottish Singles Sales (Official Charts)	1
Sweden (Sverigetopplistan)	1
Switzerland (Schweizer Hitparade)	1
UK Singles (Official Charts)	1
UK Airplay (Music Week)	1
UK Indie (Official Charts)	1
US Billboard Hot 100	1
US Adult Pop Airplay (Billboard)	25
US Pop Airplay (Billboard)	1
US Rhythmic Airplay (Billboard)	10
US CHR/Pop (Radio & Records)	1
US CHR/Rhythmic (Radio & Records)	11
US Hot AC (Radio & Records)	26

Weekly chart performance
Chart (2024–2026)	Peak position
Finland Airplay (Radiosoittolista)	84
Poland (Polish Airplay Top 100)	45

=== Year-end charts ===
Year-end chart performance
Chart (1998)	Position
US Mainstream Top 40 (Billboard)	100
US CHR/Pop (Radio & Records)	82

Chart (1999)	Position
Australia (ARIA)	2
Austria (Ö3 Austria Top 40)	3
Belgium (Ultratop 50 Flanders)	1
Belgium (Ultratop 50 Wallonia)	1
Brazil (Crowley Broadcast Analysis)	94
Canada Top Singles (RPM)	19
Canada Adult Contemporary (RPM)	39
Canada Dance/Urban (RPM)	21
European Hot 100 Singles (Billboard)	2
European Radio Top 100 (Billboard)	1
France (SNEP)	7
Germany (Media Control)	3
Italy (Musica e dischi)	4
Netherlands (Dutch Top 40)	3
Netherlands (Single Top 100)	3
New Zealand (RIANZ)	12
Romania (Romanian Top 100)	2
Sweden (Hitlistan)	8
Switzerland (Schweizer Hitparade)	3
Taiwan (Hito Radio)	24
UK Singles (OCC)	1
UK Airplay (Music Week)	3
UK Pop (Music Week)	15
US Billboard Hot 100	5
US Adult Top 40 (Billboard)	60
US Mainstream Top 40 (Billboard)	3
US Rhythmic Top 40 (Billboard)	34
US CHR/Pop (Radio & Records)	4
US CHR/Rhythmic (Radio & Records)	36

=== Decade-end charts ===
Decade-end chart performance
Chart (1990–1999)	Position
Austria (Ö3 Austria Top 40)	59
Belgium (Ultratop 50 Flanders)	28
Canada (Nielsen SoundScan)	75
Netherlands (Dutch Top 40)	13
UK Singles (OCC)	8
US Billboard Hot 100	78

=== All-time charts ===
All-time chart performance
Chart	Position
UK Singles (OCC)	33

== Certifications and sales ==
Certifications and sales for "...Baby One More Time"
Region	Certification	Certified units/sales
Australia (ARIA)	3× Platinum	210,000^{^}
Austria (IFPI Austria)	Platinum	50,000^{*}
Belgium (BRMA)	3× Platinum	150,000^{*}
Denmark (IFPI Danmark)	Platinum	90,000^{‡}
France (SNEP)	Platinum	500,000^{*}
Germany (BVMI)	3× Gold	750,000^{^}
Italy	—	70,000
Italy (FIMI) since 2009	Platinum	100,000^{‡}
Netherlands (NVPI)	Platinum	75,000^{^}
New Zealand (RMNZ)	3× Platinum	90,000^{‡}
Norway (IFPI Norway)	3× Platinum	
Portugal (AFP)	Gold	20,000^{‡}
Spain (Promusicae)	Platinum	60,000^{‡}
Sweden (GLF)	Platinum	30,000^{^}
Switzerland (IFPI Switzerland)	Platinum	50,000^{^}
United Kingdom (BPI)	4× Platinum	2,400,000^{‡}
United States (RIAA)	5× Platinum	5,000,000^{‡}
Summaries
Worldwide	—	10,000,000
^{*} Sales figures based on certification alone.^{^} Shipments figures based on certification alone.^{‡} Sales+streaming figures based on certification alone.

== Release history ==
Release dates and formats for "...Baby One More Time"
Region	Date	Format(s)	Label(s)	Ref.
United States	September 29, 1998	Contemporary hit radio; rhythmic contemporary radio	Jive	
United States	October 23, 1998	12-inch vinyl; cassette; CD; maxi CD	Jive	
Australia	January 11, 1999	Maxi CD	Festival Mushroom	
France	February 8, 1999	Maxi CD	Jive	
Germany	February 15, 1999	Maxi CD	Rough Trade	
United Kingdom	February 15, 1999	Cassette; maxi CD	Jive	
United Kingdom	February 22, 1999	Maxi CD (Note: In the UK, "...Baby One More Time" was made available in two maxi CD variants.)	Jive	
France	March 23, 1999	CD	Jive	
United States	September 26, 2025	4-inch vinyl (Note: exclusive to Target; double single with "Oops!... I Did It Again")	Legacy	

== See also ==
- List of best-selling singles
- List of best-selling singles in the United Kingdom
- List of Billboard Hot 100 number ones of 1999
- List of Billboard Hot 100 number-one singles of the 1990s
- List of Billboard Hot 100 top-ten singles in 1999
- List of number-one hits of 1999 (Austria)
- List of number-one hits of 1999 (Italy)
- List of number-one singles of 1999 (Ireland)
- List of number-one singles of 1999 (Canada)
- List of number-one singles of 1999 (Finland)
- List of number-one hits of 1999 (Germany)
- List of number-one singles of the 1990s (Switzerland)
- List of number-one singles of 1999 (France)
- List of number-one hits of 1999 (Denmark)
- List of UK top-ten singles in 1999
- List of Dutch Top 40 number-one singles of 1999
- List of European number-one hits of 1999
- List of UK Independent Singles Chart number ones of 1999
