= A Rose in the Wind =

1998 single by Anggun

Single by Anggun

from the album Snow on the Sahara
- Released: 26 November 1997
- Recorded: 1997
- Genre: Pop
- Length: 4:25
- Label: Columbia; Sony Music
- Songwriters: Erick Benzi; Nikki Matheson (Note: English version only); Anggun (Note: Indonesian version only)
- Producer: Erick Benzi

Anggun singles chronology
"Snow on the Sahara" (1997)	"A Rose in the Wind" (1997)	"Au nom de la lune" (1998)

Music video
- "A Rose in the Wind" on YouTube

Licensed audios
- "La rose des vents" on YouTube; "Kembali" on YouTube

"A Rose in the Wind" (titled "La rose des vents" for the French version and "Kembali" for the Indonesian version) is a song recorded by Indonesian singer Anggun for her international debut album, Snow on the Sahara (1997). The song was written in French by its producer Erick Benzi, before being adapted to English by Nikki Matheson and to Indonesian by Anggun. It was released as the album's second single, with a music video being directed by Jean-Baptiste Erreca.

== Background and composition ==
The song opens with an exotic-sounding flute, subdued verses and a soaring chorus. Some Indonesian spoken parts are heard. Anggun said that "A Rose in the Wind" was her favourite on the album: "It's my real story. It's the most personal song in terms of melody and a perfect example of what you find between Indonesia and the culture here [the West]. Lyrically, it's something in which you can find the different faces of me, of a woman, the weak, the strong, the things that frighten me, my dreams. This is so personal".

== Music video ==
The accompanying music video shows Anggun noticing a light that lands in her hands, transforming into a futuristic-looking sphere. She sings. The sphere transforms into the four elements while another light changes colors.

== Reception ==
"A Rose in the Wind" was ranked second on Billboard Critics' Poll 1998, behind Celine Dion's "My Heart Will Go On". The magazine's radio editor Chuck Taylor described the song as "Western rhythmic influences meshed with graciously textured vocals. This talented ingenue puts the "art" back in "artist"." "A Rose in the Wind" was chosen as one of the theme songs for the 1999 NBA championship, and was included on the compilation I Still Love This Game!: NBA Commemorative Collection.

== Track listing ==
- French CD Single
1. "La rose des vents" – 4:25
2. "Kembali" – 4:25
3. "A Rose in the Wind" – 4:25
- European CD Single
1. "A Rose in the Wind" (Edit) – 3:53
2. "Kembali" – 4:26
3. "La rose des vents" – 4:23
- Japanese CD Single
1. "A Rose in the Wind" – 3:53
2. "Plus fort que les frontieres " – 3:12
3. "La memoire des rochers" – 4:25

== Charts ==
Chart (1998–99)	Peak position
France (SNEP)	49
Indonesia (ASIRI)	1
Italy (FIMI)	17
Malaysia (RIM)	1
