= List of number-one hits of 1999 (Denmark) =

This is a list of the Danish Singles Chart number-one hits of 1999 from the International Federation of the Phonographic Industry and Nielsen Soundscan. They were provided through Billboard magazine under the "Hits of the World" section.

== Chart history ==
Issue date	Song	Artist
4 January	"Believe"	Cher
11 January	"Believe"	Cher
18 January	“Romeo”	Blå Øjne
25 January	“Romeo”	Blå Øjne
30 January	“Romeo”	Blå Øjne
6 February	“Romeo”	Blå Øjne
13 February	“Romeo”	Blå Øjne
20 February	“Romeo”	Blå Øjne
27 February	“Romeo”	Blå Øjne
8 March	“Romeo”	Blå Øjne
15 March	“Romeo”	Blå Øjne
22 March	“…Baby One More Time"	Britney Spears
29 March	“…Baby One More Time"	Britney Spears
5 April	“…Baby One More Time"	Britney Spears
12 April	“…Baby One More Time"	Britney Spears
19 April	"Dig & Mig"	Blå Øjne
26 April	"Dig & Mig"	Blå Øjne
3 May	"Selv En Dråbe"	Various Danish Artists
10 May	"Selv En Dråbe"	Various Danish Artists
17 May	"Selv En Dråbe"	Various Danish Artists
24 May	"Selv En Dråbe"	Various Danish Artists
31 May	"Selv En Dråbe"	Various Danish Artists
7 June	"Selv En Dråbe"	Various Danish Artists
14 June	"Selv En Dråbe"	Various Danish Artists
21 June	"Selv En Dråbe"	Various Danish Artists
28 June	"Mamma Mia"	ABBA Teens
5 July	"2 Times"	Ann Lee
12 July	"Mambo No. 5"	Lou Bega
19 July	"Mambo No. 5"	Lou Bega
26 July	"Mambo No. 5"	Lou Bega
2 August	"Mambo No. 5"	Lou Bega
9 August	"Mambo No. 5"	Lou Bega
16 August	"Mambo No. 5"	Lou Bega
23 August	"Blue (Da Ba Dee)"	Eiffel 65
30 August	"Blue (Da Ba Dee)"	Eiffel 65
2 September	"Blue (Da Ba Dee)"	Eiffel 65
9 September	"Blue (Da Ba Dee)"	Eiffel 65
16 September	"Blue (Da Ba Dee)"	Eiffel 65
23 September	"Blue (Da Ba Dee)"	Eiffel 65
30 September	"Blue (Da Ba Dee)"	Eiffel 65
7 October	"Blue (Da Ba Dee)"	Eiffel 65
14 October	"Blue (Da Ba Dee)"	Eiffel 65
21 October	"Blue (Da Ba Dee)"	Eiffel 65
28 October	"Blue (Da Ba Dee)"	Eiffel 65
4 November	"Genie In A Bottle”	Christina Aguilera
11 November	“Grab That Thing”	Hampenberg
18 November	“Grab That Thing”	Hampenberg
25 November	“Grab That Thing”	Hampenberg
2 December	“Grab That Thing”	Hampenberg
9 December	“Grab That Thing”	Hampenberg
16 December	"Love Will Keep Us Together"	Daniel
23 December	"Love Will Keep Us Together"	Daniel

== See also ==
- 1999 in music
