= List of Cher concerts =

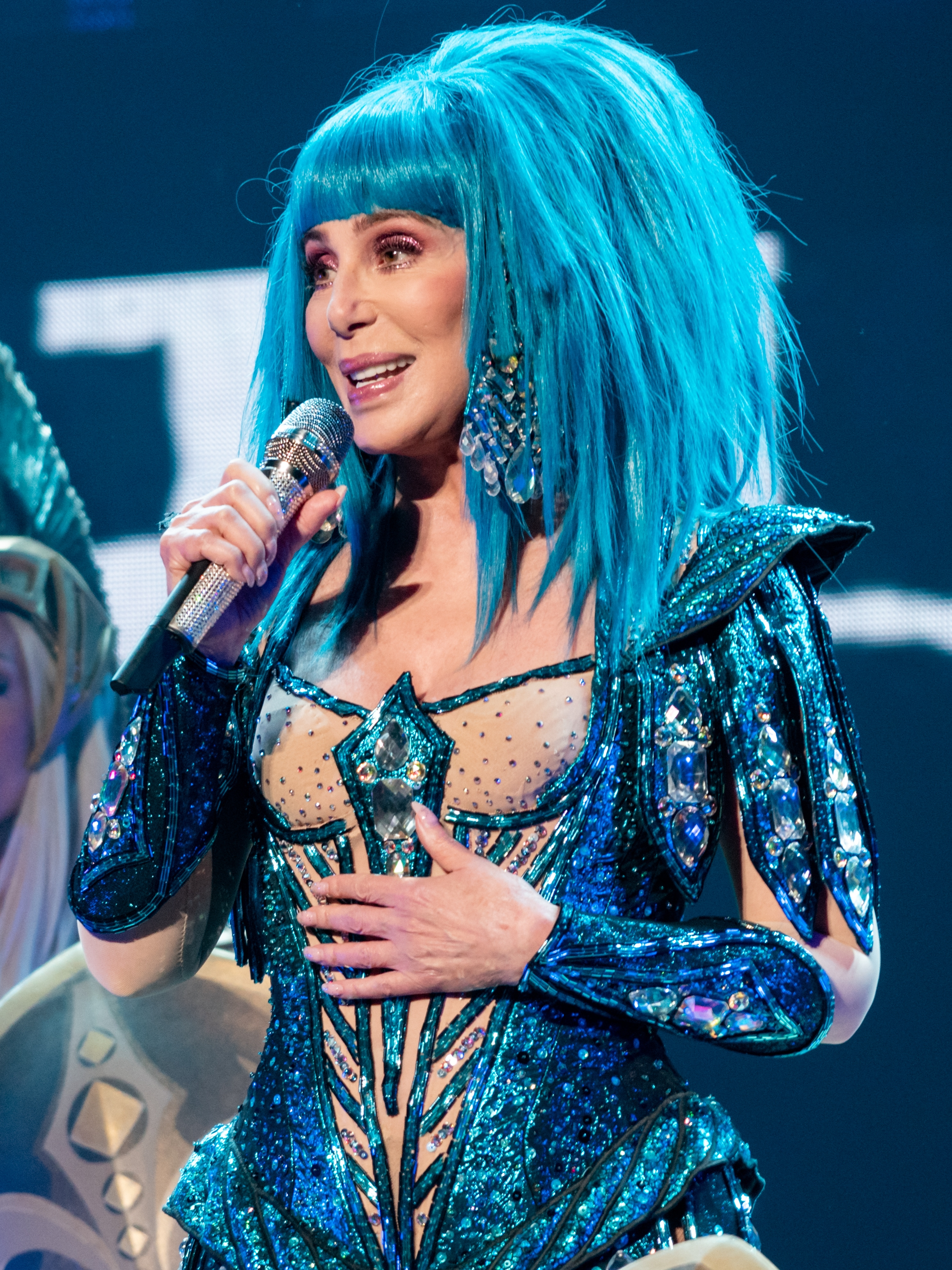
Cher performing on the Here We Go Again Tour, 2019

American singer-actress Cher has embarked on seven concert tours and three concert residencies. As a solo artist, Cher has made concerts in North America, Europe, Australia and Asia. Cher's first ever concert was with her ex-husband Sonny Bono in 1966 at the Hollywood Bowl in Los Angeles.

In 1979, Cher embarked on her first solo concert tour, the Take Me Home Tour, with performances in Europe, North America, Africa and Oceania. After the success with disco music, Cher and her boyfriend at the time, Les Dudek, formed the new wave band Black Rose with which she did her first mini-tour, The Black Rose Show. Black Rose band during their tour were the opening act for Bob Seger in Europe and for Hall & Oates during the 1980 summer in North America.

After eight years off the road, Cher did her second solo sold-out tour in 1990, the Heart of Stone Tour, which was followed up by 1992's Love Hurts Tour. The Love Hurts Tour is well known by fans for cancellations due to Cher's illness.

After the huge success of the Believe album, she did her 1999/2000 Do You Believe? Tour. In 2002, she embarked on the marathon Living Proof: The Farewell Tour, which lasted from June 2002 until April 2005. The tour featured a total 325 shows, the most ever for a concert tour by a female solo artist, and grossed more than $250 million, becoming Cher's highest-grossing tour ever. Cher closed the farewell tour in April 2005 at the Hollywood Bowl. It was the most successful tour by a single female solo artist at that time.

From May 2008 until February 2011, Cher performed at The Colosseum at Caesars Palace in Las Vegas, Nevada with her new show, Cher at the Colosseum. She signed for 200 shows over the span of three years. She was paid $60 million for her return.

After her residency, Cher began touring with the Dressed to Kill Tour in 2014 after the release of her album Closer to the Truth. Cher is one of the most successful touring artists, she was placed at number three among most successful female artists and at number twenty three overall on Billboard's Top Live Artists From 1990-2014 list.

== Concert tours ==
Year	Title	Dates	Number of performances	Release format(s)
1979–1982	Take Me Home Tour	August 16, 1979 – August 11, 1982	319	
1989–1990	Heart of Stone Tour	August 23, 1989 – August 29, 1990 (North America); October 14, 1990 – October 23, 1990 (Europe); November 5, 1990 – November 12, 1990 (Australia); December 2, 1990 – December 4, 1990 (North America)	89	VHS, Laserdisc, DVD
1991–1992	Love Hurts Tour	October 25, 1991 – March 12, 1992 (North America); April 15, 1992 – May 27, 1992 (Europe); October 23, 1992 – November 1, 1992 (North America)	43	
1999–2000	Do You Believe? Tour	June 16, 1999 – September 28, 1999 (North America); October 15, 1999 – December 15, 1999 (Europe); December 30, 1999 – March 4, 2000 (North America)	121	VHS, DVD
2002–2005	Living Proof: The Farewell Tour	June 12, 2002 – January 3, 2004 (North America); May 8, 2004 – July 2, 2004 (Europe); July 23, 2004 – February 7, 2005 (North America); February 20, 2005 – March 18, 2005 (Australasia); April 7, 2005 – April 30, 2005 (North America)	326	VHS, DVD, CD
2014	Dressed to Kill Tour	March 22, 2014 – July 11, 2014 (North America)	49	
2018–2020	Here We Go Again Tour	September 21, 2018 – October 21, 2018 (Oceania); January 17, 2019 – May 18, 2019 (North America); September 26, 2019 – November 3, 2019 (Europe); November 19, 2019 – December 19, 2019 (North America); March 6, 2020 – May 6, 2020 (North America)	85	

== Concert residencies ==
Year	Title	Dates	Number of performances	Release format(s)
2008–2011	Cher	May 6, 2008 – February 5, 2011 (North America)	192	
2017–2020	Classic Cher	February 8, 2017 – February 29, 2020 (North America)	104	
