= Au nom de la rose =

"Au Nom de la Rose"

Single by Moos

from the album Le Crabe est érotique
- B-side: Instrumental; "Qui me donnera des ailes"
- Released: 13 April 1999
- Length: 4:20
- Songwriters: Francis Lai, Moos, Pascal Castro

Moos singles chronology
| "Qui me donnera des ailes" (1998) | "Au Nom de la Rose" (1999) | "Délicate Chatte" (1999) |

"Au Nom de la rose" is a 1999 song recorded by French singer Moos. The song was released on 13 April 1999 as the second single from his sole album Le Crabe est érotique. It became a smash hit in France and Belgium (Wallonia) where it remained for several months atop of the singles chart.

== Composition ==
"Au nom de la rose" is a partly cover version in French-language of the Francis Lai song "(Where Do I Begin?) Love Story", originally recorded as theme song for the 1970 movie Love Story, directed by Arthur Hiller. Only the chorus is similar, and the lyrics are changed and deal with loss and love in a sensual way. The lyrics were written by Moos, and Lai's music reworked by Moos and Pascal Castro.

== Chart performance ==
In France, "Au nom de la rose" debuted at number six on SNEP chart on 17 April 1999, reached number one three weeks later and stayed there for nine consecutive weeks. It remained for 17 weeks in the top ten, 23 weeks in the top 50 and 29 weeks in the top 100. It achieved Diamond status after about two months and half and was the third best-selling single of 1999. In Belgium (Wallonia), the song started at number 24 on the Ultratop 40 on 15 May 1999, climbed to number five and topped the chart for eight weeks, and totaled 14 weeks in the top ten and 21 weeks in the top 40. The song ranked second on the year-end chart.

== Track listings ==
- CD single
1. "Au Nom de la rose" – 4:20
2. "Au Nom de la rose" (instrumental) – 4:20
- CD single
1. "Au nom de la rose" – 4:19
2. "Qui me donnera des ailes" – 4:18

== Charts ==
=== Weekly charts ===
| Chart (1999) | Peak position |
|---|---|
| Belgium (Ultratop 50 Wallonia) | 1 |
| France (SNEP) | 1 |

=== Year-end charts ===
| Chart (1999) | Position |
|---|---|
| Belgium (Ultratop 50 Wallonia) | 2 |
| Europe (Eurochart Hot 100) | 39 |
| France (SNEP) | 3 |

== Certifications ==
Certifications for "Au nom de la rose"
| Region | Certification | Certified units/sales |
|---|---|---|
| France (SNEP) | Diamond | 750,000^{*} |
^{*} Sales figures based on certification alone.
