= Moos (singer) =

French singer (born 1974)

Moustaphe Al-Alamy
- Born: Toulouse, France
- Origin: Morocco; Occitania France
- Genres: Soul, R&B, Funk, Pop
- Occupation: Singer
- Years active: 1999–present
- Label: Universal France

Moos is a French singer (born 1974) and had a great success with the song "Au nom de la rose".

== Biography ==
Moos was born in Toulouse to Moroccan parents and raised in the multiethnic neighborhood of Mirail, where different styles are mixed: African raï, funk, R&B. He first performed a song on Radio Toulouse, then released his first single in 1998, "Qui me donnera des ailes" ("Who Will Give Me Wings"), which was frequently played on French radio. His greatest success was the second single "Au Nom de la rose", released in 1999, which was both number one in France and Belgium (Wallonia) for several months. Le Crabe est érotique, his first and only album to date, hit success being ranked among the best-selling albums in France from May to August 1999 (11 weeks, reaching number 11). In September of that same year, Moos released his third single "Délicate Chatte", but the song failed to follow up the success as the video was censored and never shown on television. Many of his songs deals with themes related to sensuality and melancholy.

Moos has continued his music and songs like "Comme une étoile" and "Olivia" has been unofficially released on internet. Parallel with this activity he has opened a teahouse and a night club in Toulouse.

== Discography ==
=== Albums ===
- 1999 : Le Crabe est érotique : #11 in France, #18 in Belgium
1. "Qui me donnera des ailes"
2. "Au Nom de la rose"
3. "Délicate Chatte"
4. "Trois minutes trente secondes"
5. "Je cherche ma planète"
6. "Asmodée"
7. "...Au bout du cigare"
8. "Comme elle se touche"
9. "Tango Gigolo"
10. "Le Crabe érotique"
11. "...Sonnent les douze coups de mes nuits"
12. "Je cherche ma planète II"

=== Singles ===
Year	Title	Chart		Certification (FR)
Year	Title	FR	BEL (WA)	Certification (FR)
1998	"Qui me donnera des ailes"	51	—	—
1999	"Au Nom de la rose"	1	1	Diamond
1999	"Délicate Chatte"	83	18	—
