= Philanthropy and activism of Anggun =

The Indonesian pop singer Anggun has since 1997 actively campaigned for charitable causes.

== Philanthropic & humanitarian activities ==
=== 1990s and 2000s ===
In 1997, Anggun joined Sidaction, a French organization to help fighting against AIDS. Among her charity projects were Solidays (featuring her collaboration with Peter Gabriel and several international acts) and charity concert Echoes of the Earth in 2000, Les voix de l'Espoir in 2001 and Gaia in 2002 (featuring a duet with Zucchero on the song "World"). In March 2001, she is one of the many performers of the title "Que serais-je demain?" as a member of the female collective les Voix de l'espoir ( The Voices of Hope) created by Princess Erika in order to helped build a pan-African hospital in Dakar, Senegal. Anggun was involved in Global 200 by World Wide Fund for Nature (WWF) to stop the degradation of the planet's natural environment and to build a future in which humans live in harmony with nature and Anggun joined Solidays or in French called Solidarité sida, the annual festival for raising money to help people with HIV/AIDS in Africa and also to prevent the disease. In 2003, Anggun was involved in Gaia Project, an environmental benefit project, to raise awareness about the preservation of the environment, and joined a charity concert called Le concert pour le paix.

In 2005, Anggun was a part of a humanitarian project to promote tolerance in Hammamet, Tunisia. Anggun promoted a micro-credit program to help to empower women in Indonesia, and many countries worldwide. This campaign was organized by United Nations. Anggun was one of many French singers to raise money to help Tsunami victims in Asia. She herself also visited Aceh for a couple of days after the tragedy. Anggun joined Music for Asia Charity Concert in Milan, Italy to raise money to help victims of Tsunami in Asia. She has been invited to perform "Être une femme" in a concert, called Tous egaux, tous en scene in La Zenith, Paris, to fight for racial discrimination. In February 2005, she performed her song, "Être une femme", with Lady Laistee in Ni Putes Ni Soumises Concert to celebrate women empowerment and feminism. In the same year, she performed "Don't Give Up" with Peter Gabriel on United Against Malaria Concert in Geneva, Switzerland.

She also participated on the 2006 Fight AIDS, solidarity campaign held by Princess Stéphanie of Monaco's humanitarian organization called Fight Aids Monaco. She also joined on a collaborative track entitled "L'Or de nos vies" with several other French musicians and called themselves "Fight AIDS". In 2006, 2008, and 2011, Anggun was a part of Concert pour la tolérance in Agadir, Morocco to promote a message of respect for others and differences, for peace, tolerance, fraternity, dialogue between cultures and for the fight against all forms of discrimination. Anggun was part of a humanitarian project, Contre la SIDA, organized by Princess Stéphanie of Monaco, to raise money to help to fight against AIDS. She did a charity single with several female French stars, titled "Pour que tu sois libre".

During 2007, Anggun participated in several environmental projects. She became the French-language narrator of the BBC nature documentary film Earth (Un jour sur terre), an ecological documentary film by Alastair Fothergill produced by BBC Worldwide, and composed its soundtrack single, "Un jour sur terre". After the release of the movie, Disney announced the planting of around 2.7 million trees in endangered areas including the Amazonian forest. She was appointed as the ambassador of the Micro-environment Prize by the French Ministry of Ecology and Sustainable Development and National Geographic Channel.

In 2009, Anggun went to Nangroe Aceh Darussalam, Indonesia to promote the importance of mangrove forests. Her work was filmed by Gulli TV and aired in Europe, Mon Arbre Pour La Vie Voyage Au Pays de Anggun (My Tree For Life Travel to the Country of Anggun). She joined AIDES to raise money to help fighting AIDS at the same year. She along with other 75 francophone singers, including 60 French artists, formed a collective group called Collectif Paris-Africa to participate UNICEF campaign on a charity song, "Des ricochets", in order to raise awareness about Horn of Africa countries war situation and help the victims, most of them are children, by this charity. On 7 December 2009, she attended and was a part of United Nations Climate Change conference (COP15) in Copenhagen, Denmark, helping to spread an awareness message worldwide and to raise the importance of the for leaders of the world to agree and work together on this key issue that is climate change. She also performed at Dance 4 Climate Change Concert. She sang two songs as a soloist, "Snow on the Sahara" and "Stronger", and two songs as a duet, "Saviour" with Niels Brinck and "7 Seconds" with Youssou N'Dour.

=== 2010s ===
In 2010, Anggun joined former president of United States, Bill Clinton, at the 2010 Clinton Global Initiative to kick off "a Healthy Hair for Healthy Water" campaign with another public figures, such as philanthropist & creator of United Nations Foundation Ted Turner and supermodel & activist Gisele Bündchen. This event was to help the CSDW (Children's Safe Drinking Water) achieve its dream to "save a life every hour" in the developing countries around the world by providing two billion liters of clean water every year by 2020. At the same year, she with Daniel Powter, Lara Fabian, M. Pokora, Caroline Costa, Natasha St. Pier, Justin Nozuka, Sofia Essaïdi, Tom Frager, Christophe Willem, Jenifer, Bob Sinclar, Joachim Garraud and other 33 artists, credited as Collectif Artistes, appeared and featured in AIDES's album Message, specifically in a song called If, to dedicated for all the victims of AIDS worldwide.

On 1 July 2011, she appeared on game show called N'oubliez pas les paroles!, a French version of international series Don't Forget the Lyrics! with Thierry Amiel where they won €50,000 and donated those prizes to Sidaction. In 2011, Anggun joined charity show marathon, called Téléthon. Over €86 million have been collected so far to the benefit of the fight for children rare diseases, including muscular dystrophy syndrome. She co-signed an appeal with several artists and artistic personalities in favor of marriage for all and urged the French government to give the right of access to adoption for homosexual couples. She with other 40 musical artists, including will.i.am and Carly Rae Jepsen, joined a campaign project which held by La Voix de l'enfant and My Major Company to made a collective charity album called Les Voix de l'Enfant. The album sold over 50,000 copies and gained €100,000. She participated in its single, Je reprends ma route. She joined UNICEF campaign to help children in Africa. She participated as a performer at Association Laurette Fugain's concert,Départ Immédiat. She performed a duet with Tina Arena on "No More Tears (Enough Is Enough)." Anggun with Zlatan Ibrahimović and Nasser Al-Khelaifi attended the PSG's charity event Fondation du PSG in November 2013 to help children with need. This event succeed to collect funds around €190,000 or equivalent to US$221,191.35.

Anggun promoted a pressure to put an end against discrimination, child labor, forcing young girls into marriage, and prostitution at World Without Walls congress on 9 November 2014 in Berlin, Germany. Anggun, David Foster, Melanie C and Vanness Wu later collaborated on a cover version of Earth, Wind & Fire's "Let's Groove" as the charity single for Nepal earthquake relief. In 2015, Anggun became the ambassador of charity organization La Voix de l'enfant] (The Voice of the Children). Les Enfants de la Terre made collaborative project with several artists, including Anggun, to launch a musical tale album for kids and it was called Martin & les fées (Martin & The Fairies). For every €1 from its sale, all was donated to Les Enfants de la terre for giving help and aids to children with disability. She joined ‘’The Pansy Project’’, a website to denounces the cruelty of homophobia actions against LGBT communities in the world, initiated by Paul Harfleet. This project also planted Pansy on locations where homophobia action was committed. She made through one of important newspaper in France Libération or so called Libé which she made a strong stands about supporting LGBT community, sent an open letter for President of Indonesia Joko Widodo about death sentence of Serge Atlaoui, told about her new album Toujours un ailleurs, her newest updates in life, and many more. She attended 2015 United Nations Climate Change Conference (COP21) in Paris. She met Indigenous Peoples' Alliance of Nusantara (AMAN) and Indonesia Nature Film Society (Infis) when she shares her views on indigenous peoples' rights, climate change and the role we all have to play in this short interview. She did an interview with advocacy group, If Not Us, Then Who?. She was appointed to be the narrator of a documentary film titled Our Fight which broadcast through this event and France featuring stories from Kalimantan and Sumatra. She joined a campaigned advertisement called Une bonne claque by short clip for COP21 which aired on France 2. She told how we can contribute to the environment by giving little tips that help the Earth from climate change. Anggun went to Madagascar to help children with chronic diseases to get medical treatment with Aviation Without Borders. She attended at 2016 United Nations Climate Change Conference (COP22) in Marrakech, Morocco. She sang "La Neige au Sahara" and "Cesse la pluie", also did a duet with Youssou N'Dour for the fourth time on his song titled "7 Seconds".

Anggun alongside singer Monsieur Nov, actor Frédéric Chau, PSG goalkeeper Alphonse Areola, rugby player François Trinh-Duc, journalist Émilie Tran Nguyen & Raphäl Yem, chef Pierre Sang, entrepreneur Paul Duan and other Asian origin-French personalities joined a campaign clip called #Asiatiquesdefrance initiated by France 2 journalist Hélène Lam Trong and produced by journalist Mélissa Theuriau to stop Asian hate and to fight against Asian stereotyping in France. In May 2017, she attended a charity event titled The Global Gift Gala, which was held by Eva Longoria Charity Organization and The Eva Longoria Foundation with UNICEF and The Global Gift Foundation collaboration, in Paris. Anggun joined the panel of judges for the Picture This Festival for the Planet short film competition. In the event new filmmakers, storytellers, and those who feel they can change the whole world, will compete with each other. The announcement of Anggun's involvement was conveyed by Sony Pictures Television Networks (SPTN) in collaboration with the United Nations Foundation. On the Picture This Festival for the Planet judges panel, there was Anggun together with actress and advocate Megan Boone from TV series The Blacklist, president of United Nations Foundation Elizabeth Cousens, MD & CEO of Sony Pictures Networks India N. P. Singh, co-presidents & founders of Sony Pictures Classics Tom Bernard & Michael Barker, U.S. President & Chief Creative Officer of WeTransfer Damian Bradfield, as well as other prominent industry & environmental activism leaders.

In April 2018, Anggun with Milène Guermont, Axelle Red, soprano Pilar Jurado, Sylvie Hoarau from Brigitte, French rock group Blankass, Joyce Jonathan, Irish singer Eleanor McEvoy, and German composer Alexander Zuckowski joined Transfer of Value/Value Gap press conference with the members of the European Parliament Virginie Rozière, Silvia Costa and Axel Voss, also European Grouping of Societies of Authors and Composers (GESAC) & Société des auteurs, compositeurs et éditeurs de musique (SACEM) delegates. They discussed about this topic and copyright problems with President of Institute for Digital Fundamental (IDF) Rights Jean-Marie Cavada. Anggun and those artists later on joined mass online campaign titled #MakeInternetFair. This main action was to ensure that user upload platforms, like YouTube, Facebook and SoundCloud properly share the revenues they generate with the songwriters and composers whose musical works they use, addressing the so-called ‘transfer of value’ or ‘value gap’. On 17 June 2018, she was performing with French composer and musician François Meïmoun at Centre Pompidou for 55th Anniversary of Fédération Française Sésame Autisme, is a French non-profit association of parents of children and adults with autism. She sang a song called "Blocus" which she co-wrote it with François Meïmoun and Thomas Fasquerras and became the soundtrack of the event. Its lyrics were mixed up French and Indonesian language. On 26 June 2018, she was officially participating #TheFreaks, a collective of 68 French artists, such as Zazie, Pascal Obispo, and more, who are sensitive to the defense of the environment and the protection of our ecosystems. This was an initiative action from French electro-rock band Shaka Ponk. Therefore, they committed to adopting new behaviors to fight over-consumption, pollution, global warming and protect biodiversity.

On 19 January 2019, she performed at the Teatro Odeon, Ponsacco to helped campaign of charity music event Monte Serra by Music for Life Association with another artists such as Matteo Becucci and Jonathan Canini. In March 2019, Anggun alongside Yann Arthus-Bertrand, Paul Lynch, Zaz, Kate Atkinson, Joanna Trollope, and more than 450 artists, authors, writers, also journalists all over Europe signed the petition & open letter to European Parliament in Strasbourg. The open letter forced the Parliament to think more about the future of copyright and protection for European creators with strict regulations. Anggun and those artists-journalists held a campaign #Yes2Copyright to raise awareness among European citizen about the importance and consequences of this problem. On 5 July 2019, she staged a charity concert, called Gemilang 30 Tahun at the Tennis Indoor Stadium in Senayan, Central Jakarta, and sponsored by consumer goods producer P&G, the concert's theme is titled, Unify the Tunes, Make Indonesian Children's Dreams Come True. According to a post on the Instagram account of children's welfare foundation @savechildren_id, the funds be used to construct 100 classrooms in schools affected by natural disasters in Palu and Donggala in Central Sulawesi, Lombok in West Nusa Tenggara, Sumba Island in East Nusa Tenggara and West Java. Donations collected from this concert are IDR3,060,000,000 or equals to US$218,560.50. As the part of charity event, Anggun auctioned off his shoes which are products from designer Christian Louboutin type 'circus city spiked cutout gold' which has an initial price of US$1,295. Anggun committed to reversing the biodiversity loss curve by joining WWF France #PasLeDernier campaign. Anggun joined WWF Indonesia collaboration's campaign and awareness program to protect Sumatran elephant, called A Night for Wildlife Preservation in Indonesia, on 13 November 2019 at Embassy of Indonesia, Paris. There were Muslim, Gayo elephant activist, Indonesian singer and founder of Teman Gajah (Friend of Elephant) Tulus, 2019-2021 Indonesian Ambassador to France Arrmanatha Christiawan Nasir, and Paris Peace Forum steering committee Yenny Wahid.

=== 2020s—present ===
On 17 July 2020, she became leader of the panelist or investigateur, while Cartman and Chris Marques were the member of her team, on television reality show Good Singers, an adapted Korean television program I Can See Your Voice. She won €28,500 or equivalent to US$33,082.77 and she donated those prize to Aviation Without Borders. Another team was led by Amir while Julie Zenatti and Titoff were the member of his team. She performed a song "Lady Marmalade" with legendary cabaret dance troupe Moulin Rouge on 25 June 2020 at TV special for charity event 100 ans de comédies musicales : les stars chantent pour Sidaction to fight against AIDS, even though COVID-19 pandemic was roaming. In December 2020, she shared a video from The Pansy Project (Les Pensées de Paul), which was a 2015 documentary film by English artist-activist Paul Harfleet that denounces homophobia and violence against the LGBT community. The film was directed by Jean-Baptiste Erreca. Anggun was a cameo in the promotional trailer of the documentary and her song, called "Try", was chosen to be the soundtrack of the documentary.

In April 2021, Anggun alongside 35 French celebrities, such as Patrice Leconte, Iris Mittenaere, Chimene Badi, Ibrahim Maalouf and more, joined solidarity raffle held by Association Laurette Fugain, an association that aims to fight leukemia. It owes its name to Laurette Fugain, the daughter of Stéphanie and Michel Fugain, who died in 2002 cause of this disease at the age of 22. To join this raffle, the persons had to buy one or more €10 tickets donation from 31 March to 31 May 2021. If they got lucky and win this raffle, each one of the winners got the chance to meet one of those celebrities in person. On 14 June 2021, she was invited to perform in order to support and celebrate World Blood Donor Day 2021 at Auditorium Parco della Musica in Rome, Italy. At that event, she sang three songs and was appointed as an International Ambassador of the Blood Donors by WHO, Ministry of Health and President of the Republic. Anggun performed in Aquileia as her continued Italia tour. This tour concert was part of Le Note del Dono project to celebrated the anniversary of Fratres group which the idea of this project came from Italian artistic director Marco Vanni. This project aims to promote, through music, the culture of total donation, such as blood, blood components, organs, tissues, stem cells, cord, and medulla - which style of life that safeguards health and well-being and that is moved by human solidarity, civic conscience and, for those who believe, by charity. The donation of a country's biological material is an index of civilization and every gift is a free human drug that saves lives. On 25 August 2021, Anggun joined Italy solidarity event, Mattone del cuore, held by Paolo Brosio's Olimpiadi del Cuore Association and Fondazione della Nazionale Cantanti in Forte dei Marmi. This event was held for Italian families in difficulty after COVID-19 who may have dependent people with physical or mental disability or associations that deal with psychic or physical disabled people, and in part to the great project Mattone del Cuore Primo Pronto Soccorso di Medjiugorie (Bosnia Erzegovina) and in third world countries for the care and assistance of children patients with leukemia and blood cancers to treat them directly in their countries and in their hospitals with the assistance of the best specialists in the world. A project managed by the Cure2Children Association of Florence. Anggun and several French celebrities joined donation campaign called Winter Time 2021 which held by Imagine For Margo - Children Without Cancer Association and Comité du Faubourg Saint-Honoré. She donated her pair of shoes which designed by Christian Louboutin. Anggun made a visit to a special need public school, namely Sekolah Luar Biasa Negeri Pembina in Jayapura, in order to support the teacher, parents, and disability students there as solidarity campaign and social project for 2021 National Paralympic Week.

On 15 January 2022, she attended as guest for Spectaculaire on France 2, a charity family TV show which brings together on stage the best numbers of performances from all the disciplines and honors prestigious artists from all over the world with exhibits exceptional performances, such as acrobatic roller skating, aerial hoop, flaming Cyr wheel, etc. She sang "Caruso" featured virtual "Luciano Pavarotti". This show's particular episode had collected €140,000 and donated those prizes to Aviation Without Borders. Anggun along with her husband were invited by Élise Boghossian to perform for EliseCare's solidarity concert at Olympia. This concert was being held as a solidarity act for children who were victimized by the war in Iraq, Syria, Armenia, Lebanon, Ethiopia and Ukraine. Anggun became a leader of the panelists again on Good Singers (season 3) second episode, with Booder and Diane Leyre were the member of her team. She won over Joyce Jonathan for €13,500 and donated to Aviation Without Borders.
