= Yang Hilang =

- Initial release artwork, prior to its reissue with an updated booklet and credits.

Greatest hits album by Anggun C. Sasmi
- Released: 1994
- Recorded: 1989–1994
- Genre: Rock, pop rock, hard rock
- Label: Blackboard Indonesia
- Producer: Anggun

Anggun C. Sasmi chronology
Anggun C. Sasmi... Lah!!! (1993)	Yang Hilang (1994)	Snow on the Sahara (1997)

Singles from Yang Hilang
- 1. "Yang Hilang" Released: 1994

Yang Hilang (meaning The Lost One) is a greatest hits album by Indonesian singer Anggun. It was released in 1994 by Blackboard Indonesia, compiling her well-known Indonesian hits with two brand new songs, "Yang Hilang" and "Masa Masa Remaja".

== Background and Composition ==
After releasing five studio albums—Dunia Aku Punya, Kepada Alam dan Pencintanya, Anak Putih Abu-Abu, Nocturno, and Anggun C. Sasmi...Lah!!!—she became dissatisfied with her success in the domestic market and began to pursue an international music career. She subsequently released Yang Hilang as her final album in Indonesia, which was a compilation necessary to fulfill her remaining contractual obligations.

Yang Hilang was written by her long-time composer Teddy Sudjaja, song's lyrics can be interpreted to her music career which was "lost" for three years before coming back with her debut international album, Snow on the Sahara (1997).

== Content ==
The album features her well-known Indonesian hit singles since 1989 with two brand new songs, "Yang Hilang" and "Masa Masa Remaja". The album excluded all material from her debut and final Indonesian studio albums, Dunia Aku Punya (1986) and Anggun C. Sasmi... Lah!!! (1993). Other notable exclusions from the compilation are "Takut" and "Bayang Bayang Ilusi".

On the first edition cover sleeve, Anggun jokingly wrote the credits as Billy Sheehan from Mr. Big (bass), Rick Wakeman from Yes (keyboard), John Bonham from Led Zeppelin (drum), which were not true.

== Single ==
"Yang Hilang" was released as Anggun's final single in Indonesia. It was accompanied by a music video directed by Christ Sinyal and features a cameo appearance by actor Marcellino Lefrandt. It became another hit on the charts, peaking inside the Top 10 in the Indonesian Airplay Chart.

== Track listing ==
No.	Title	Writer(s)	Album	Length
1.	"Yang Hilang"	Teddy Sudjaja, Pamungkas NM	Previously Unreleased	5:00
2.	"Masa Masa Remaja"	Teddy Sudjaja, Tontowi	Previously Unreleased	3:18
3.	"Ku Tak Ingin"	Teddy Sudjaja, Pamungkas NM	Nocturno	5:01
4.	"Nafas Cinta"	Teddy Sudjaja, Pamungkas NM	Anak Putih Abu Abu	6:05
5.	"Anak Putih Abu Abu"	Teddy Sudjaja, Tontowi	Anak Putih Abu Abu	4:38
6.	"Mimpi"	Teddy Sudjaja, Pamungkas NM	Mimpi	4:03
7.	"Tua-Tua Keladi"	Teddy Sudjaja, Pamungkas NM	Tua-Tua Keladi	4:55
8.	"Sentuhan Dewata"	Hans MB, Yudhie NH	Nocturno	4:51
9.	"Gaya Remaja"	Teddy S., Mauli G., dan Narashima	Gaya Remaja	4:15
10.	"Problema Cinta"	Kecuk CH Dawung, Yudhie NH	Nocturno	4:44
11.	"Batu Batu" (Solo Version)	Rudy NH		4:36
12.	"Nocturno"	Pay Burman, Rustam	Nocturno	4:23
Total length:				55:49

== Personnel ==
Credits adapted from album liner notes Yang Hilang.

- Anggun – lead vocals; producer
- Ian Antono – arranger
- Pinky Mirror – photography
- Benny S. – graphic design
