= Anggun =

Indonesian-French singer and actress (born 1974)

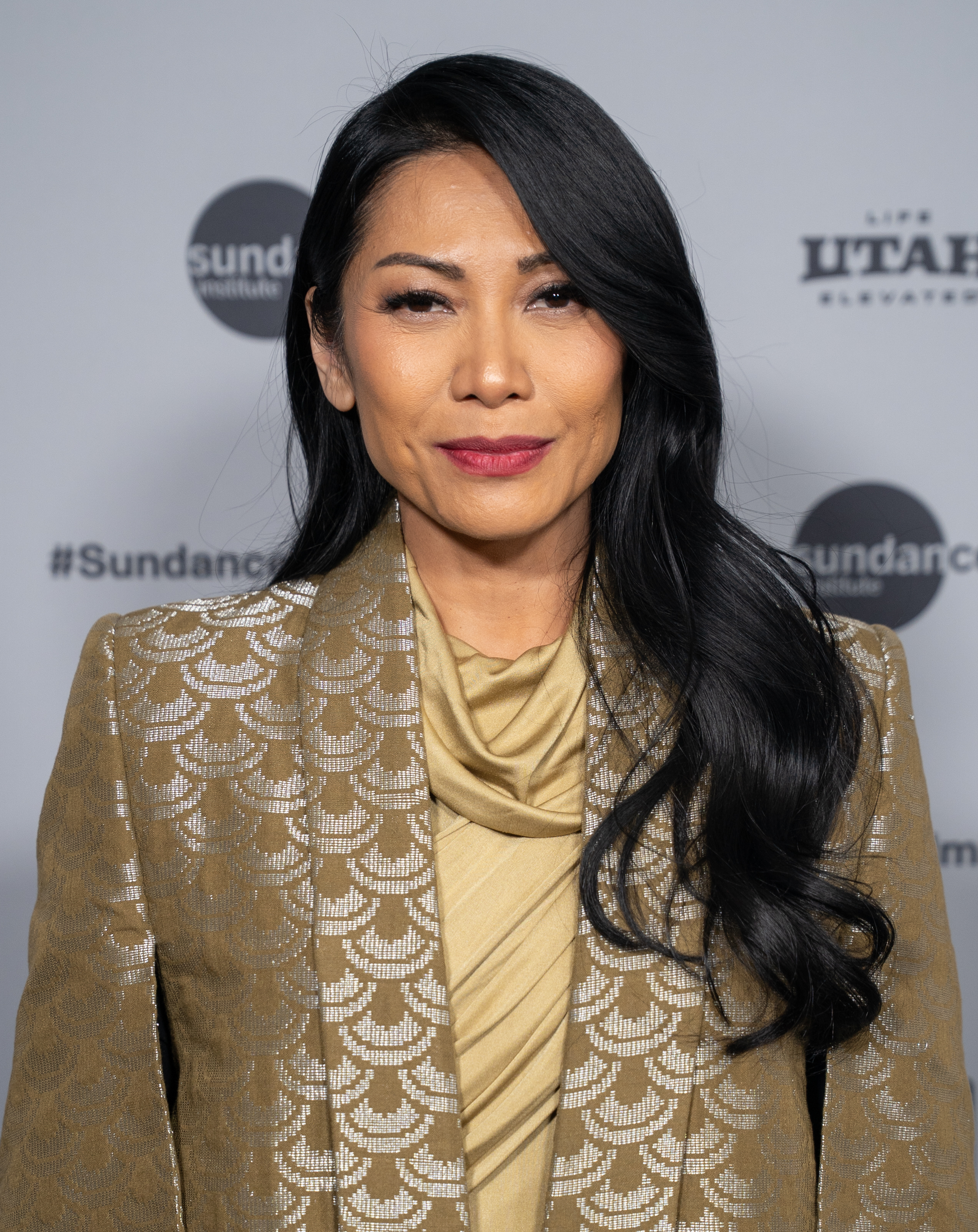
- Anggun at the 2026 Sundance Film Festival
- Born: Anggun Cipta Sasmi; 29 April 1974 (age 52); Jakarta, Indonesia
- Other name: Anggun C. Sasmi (Note: Her stage name when she began her career in Indonesia. She has used mononym professionally since Snow on the Sahara (1997).)
- Citizenship: Indonesia (until 2000) (Note: Indonesia does not recognise dual citizenship. Anggun had automatically lost her Indonesian citizenship by the time she became a French citizen during the release of her second international album, Chrysalis (2000). She received Indonesian golden visa in 2026 for her contribution as a global talent from the country.); France (from 2000)
- Occupations: Singer; songwriter; producer; actress; television personality
- Years active: 1983–present
- Spouses: Michel Georgea (m. 1992; div. 1999) Olivier Maury (m. 2004; div. 2006) Cyril Montana (m. 2006; div. 2015) Christian Kretschmar (m. 2018)
- Children: 1
- Musical career
- Genres: Pop; rock; world; R&B
- Instruments: Vocals; piano
- Labels: April Earth; Universal; Sony; TF1 Musique; Warner
- Website: www.anggun.com

Anggun Cipta Sasmi (Indonesian: [ˌaŋɡʊn ˌt͡ʃip̚t̪a ˈsasmi]; born 29 April 1974) is an Indonesian and French singer, songwriter, actress, and television personality. Born in Jakarta, she recorded a children's album at the age of nine and rose to fame as a teenage rock star in the late 1980s. By 1993 she had released five Indonesian-language studio albums. Rolling Stone listed her breakthrough single "Mimpi" as one of the 150 Greatest Indonesian Songs of All Time.

Anggun immigrated to Europe in 1994 and recorded her first international album, Snow on the Sahara (1997). It was released in 33 countries by Sony Music and sold more than one million copies worldwide. Since then, Anggun has released another six studio albums—in English and French—and a soundtrack album to the Danish film Open Hearts (2002). Her singles "Snow on the Sahara", "What We Remember", "The Good Is Back", and "Perfect World" entered the Billboard charts in the United States while "In Your Mind", "Saviour" and "I'll Be Alright" charted on the Billboard European Hot 100 Singles. She represented France in the Eurovision Song Contest 2012, with the song "Echo (You and I)".

On television, Anggun served as a judge for the continent-wide Asia's Got Talent (2015–2019), as well as the Indonesian versions of The X Factor (2013) and The Voice (2018); the French versions of Masked Singer (2019–2022) and Drag Race (2026); and the Belgian version of Starmaker (2023). Her acting works include roles in the films Coup de foudre à Bangkok (2020) and Levitating (2026), as well as the American series Reacher (2026). For theatre productions, Anggun was the leading actress in the 2023 French musical Al Capone and the 2024 Italian revival of Jesus Christ Superstar. She actively campaigned for charitable causes and became the global ambassador of the United Nations twice, first for the International Year of Microcredit in 2005 and then for the Food and Agriculture Organization (FAO) in 2009.

Anggun is one of the best-selling Asian artists outside Asia, with her releases being certified gold and platinum in some European countries. She is the first Indonesian artist to have success in European and American record charts. She has received accolades, including the Officier des Arts et des Lettres from the Government of France, the World Music Award for World's Best-Selling Indonesian Artist, and the Asian Television Award for Outstanding Contribution to Asian Television Performing Arts. She became the first woman from Indonesia to be immortalized in wax by Madame Tussauds. The Indonesian Music Museum selected Anggun among the 10 greatest Indonesian female musicians of all time.

== Life and career ==
=== 1974–1993: Early life and career in Indonesia ===
Anggun was born in Jakarta on 29 April 1974. She is the second child of Darto Singo, a Javanese writer, and Dien Herdina, a housewife from the Yogyakarta royal family. Her full name means "grace born of a dream". Despite being a Muslim, Anggun was sent to a Catholic school to receive a better elementary education. At the age of seven, Anggun began receiving daily strict instructions in singing and was given homework to write poems with the melodies that could become a song, aimed at triggering her songwriting skills, by her father. Even though her father was not a singer, he guided her to improve her vocal skill by following the instructions in a vocal practicing book written by Bina Vokalia vocal coach Pranadjaja. Her mother began serving as her manager. At the age of nine, Anggun started writing her own songs and recorded her debut album, which featured covers of songs by Indonesian country singer Ritta Rubby Hartland, titled Kepada Alam dan Pencintanya (1983). However, the album was not published until she gained recognition in the early 1990s.

"Tua Tua Keladi" (1990)
One of Anggun's biggest Indonesian hits in the early 1990s. "Tua Tua Keladi" was heavily influenced by rock music, her musical trademark at the time.

In adolescence, Anggun was influenced by Western rock music and she began to choose her career as a rock singer. In 1986, she met Ian Antono, the guitarist and music producer of God Bless, and released her first commercial studio album, Dunia Aku Punya; however, it did not achieve commercial success. She rose to fame three years later, with the single "Mimpi"; it was ranked by Rolling Stone Indonesia as one of the 150 Greatest Indonesian Songs of All Time. In the early 1990s she released hit singles such as "Tua Tua Keladi", "Laba Laba", and "Takut". She recorded the studio albums Anak Putih Abu Abu (1991) and Nocturno (1992). The former earned her the Most Popular Indonesian Artist 1990–1991 award by Popular Magazine.

In 1992, Anggun began a relationship with Michel Georgea, a French engineer. They married, despite a rumoured objection by Anggun's family on the grounds that Anggun was too young. Georgea later became Anggun's manager. The following year, Anggun became the youngest Indonesian singer to found her own record company, Bali Cipta Records, taking creative control over her work. She produced her fourth (fifth overall) Indonesian studio album, Anggun C. Sasmi... Lah!!! (1993), which yielded the hit song "Kembalilah Kasih (Kita Harus Bicara)". By age nineteen, she had sold over four million albums in Indonesia. She was dissatisfied with her success in her country and began considering an international music career.

=== 1994–1999: International breakthrough with Snow on the Sahara ===
"I dreamt of having this international career, but producers won't come to Indonesia to look for talent when there is so much available in their own countries. I had to go there. In Indonesia, we don't have that much information coming in; it comes from just one source. And the Internet wasn't as big as it is now."

— Anggun in an interview with journalist Chuck Taylor from Billboard magazine in 1998.

In 1994, after releasing the greatest hits album Yang Hilang, Anggun sold her record company to fund her move to London, England. Anggun admitted to culture shock and financial problems while trying to start her new life there. She began writing songs and sent demos to record companies around London, but they came back with negative replies. After a year without any career progress, Anggun considered relocating to the Netherlands, but decided to move to France.

In 1996, she met French singer Florent Pagny, who became her mentor and introduced her to French producer Erick Benzi. Impressed by her musical skill, Benzi offered her a recording project. Anggun was signed to Columbia France and Sony Music. After learning to speak French for only three months, Anggun worked on her debut album with Benzi. In June 1997, she released her first French-language album, entitled Au nom de la lune, an artistic departure experimenting with world music and adult contemporary sounds.

The album's first single, "La neige au Sahara", reached number three on SNEP's airplay chart and number sixteen on its sales chart. It became the most played French-language song of 1997 and was certified Gold for 250,000 copies sold. Other charted singles from the album were "La rose des vents" and "Au nom de la lune", the later becoming her second top-twenty airplay hit in France. Au nom de la lune peaked at number 34 on the French Albums Chart and sold over 150,000 copies in France and Belgium. Anggun received a nomination for Best New Artist at the 1998 Victoires de la Musique.

The English version of the album, titled Snow on the Sahara (or Anggun in some pressings), was released in 33 countries between 1997 and 1999. Stephen Thomas Erlewine from AllMusic called the album "a promising debut" because "she illustrates enough full-formed talent on the disc". Its lead single, "Snow on the Sahara" reached number one in Italy, number five on the Japan's Tokio Hot 100, and number six on the UK Pop Club Chart. The song was used as the soundtrack for a marketing campaign by the Swiss watchmaker Swatch. The second single, "A Rose in the Wind" became her second top-twenty hit in Italy. Snow on the Sahara has sold over 1.5 million copies worldwide.

In North America, Snow on the Sahara was released in May 1998 by Epic Records. Anggun went on a tour for nine months in the US to promote the album. She appeared on American television programs such as The Rosie O'Donnell Show, Sessions at West 54th, Penn & Teller's Sin City Spectacular, and CNN World Beat. The album peaked at 23 on the Billboard Heatseekers Albums Chart and shipped 200,000 units. The single reached 16 on the Billboard Hot Dance Music/Club Play and 22 on the Billboard Adult Top 40. The album track "On the Breath of an Angel" was used on American television series Passions and television film The Princess and the Marine, both aired on NBC.

=== 2000–2003: Chrysalis and Open Hearts ===
After divorcing Michel Georgea in 1999, Anggun worked on her second French album, Désirs contraires, released in September 1999. It experimented with electropop and ambient elements as well as R&B. The album was produced by Benzi, with some of Anggun's compositions. It peaked at number 48 on the French albums chart and sold about 30,000 copies there. The album's first single, "Un geste d'amour", reached 62 on the French Singles Chart. The English version enjoyed more success. Chrysalis was released at the same time as Désirs contraires Distributed simultaneously in 15 countries, it spawned the hit single "Still Reminds Me", which received high airplay across Asia and Europe. It became her third number-one hit in Indonesia since her international career and her third top 20 single in Italy (peaking at number 17). It reached the top five on the Music & Media European Border Breakers Chart. She released a single especially for the Indonesian and Malaysian market, "Yang 'Ku Tunggu" (the Indonesian version of "Un geste d'amour"), which became a number-one hit in the region.

At the end of 2000 Anggun the Vatican invited her to appear at a Christmas concert. The following month, she started a tour across Asia and Europe, including her first concert in France at Le Bataclan on 1 February 2001. The tour ended on 30 April 2001 at Kallang Theatre, Singapore. In 2002, she received the Women Inspire Award from Singapore's Beacon of Light for "her achievements as a role model for many young women in Asia." The next year, she was honored with Cosmopolitan Indonesia's Fun Fearless Female of the Year Award.

Collaborations, soundtrack projects, and charity albums included a French-English song with DJ Cam entitled "Summer in Paris" on his 2002 album, Soulshine; an Indonesian-English song with Deep Forest entitled "Deep Blue Sea" on their 2002 album, Music Detected; and three collaborations in 2003, including with Italian rock singers Piero Pelù, Serge Lama and Tri Yann. Her duet with Pelù entitled "Amore immaginato" became a hit in Italy, spending over two months at the top of the Italian Airplay Chart; she sung it at the Italian Music Awards in 2003.

Anggun participated in two Scandinavian movies: contributing the song "Rain (Here Without You)" for Anja & Viktor in 2001, and the entire soundtrack for Open Hearts in 2002. For Open Hearts, Anggun worked with two Danish producers, Jesper Winge Leisner and Niels Brinck. "Open Your Heart" was released as a single from the soundtrack album and charted at 51 on the Norwegian Singles Chart. It earned Anggun a nomination for Best Original Song at the Danish Film Academy's Robert Awards in 2003. "Counting Down" was released as a single and became a top-ten airplay hit in Indonesia. Anggun left Sony Music in 2003 after its merger with BMG Music. She moved to Montreal, Canada where Olivier Maury became her manager. In 2004, Anggun and Maury were married in a private ceremony in Bali.

=== 2004–2009: Luminescence and Elevation ===
In 2004, Anggun returned to Paris and landed a record deal with Heben Music. She began working on her next album with producers including Jean-Pierre Taieb and Frederic Jaffre. Anggun enlisted the help of French songwriters such as Jean Fauque, Lionel Florence, Tété and Evelyn Kral to adapt her English songs into French. In late 2004, Anggun released her first solo French single in nearly four years, "Être une femme", which became Anggun's second top-20 hit in France and her first French single to chart on the Swiss Singles Chart. Anggun's third French album, Luminescence, was released in February 2005. It reached number 16 on the French Albums Chart was certified Gold for selling 100,000 copies. The second single, "Cesse la pluie" reached the charts in Belgium, France, and Switzerland. According to Francophonie Diffusion, "Être une femme" and "Cesse la pluie" were the second and the fifth most-played French singles of 2005 worldwide, respectively.

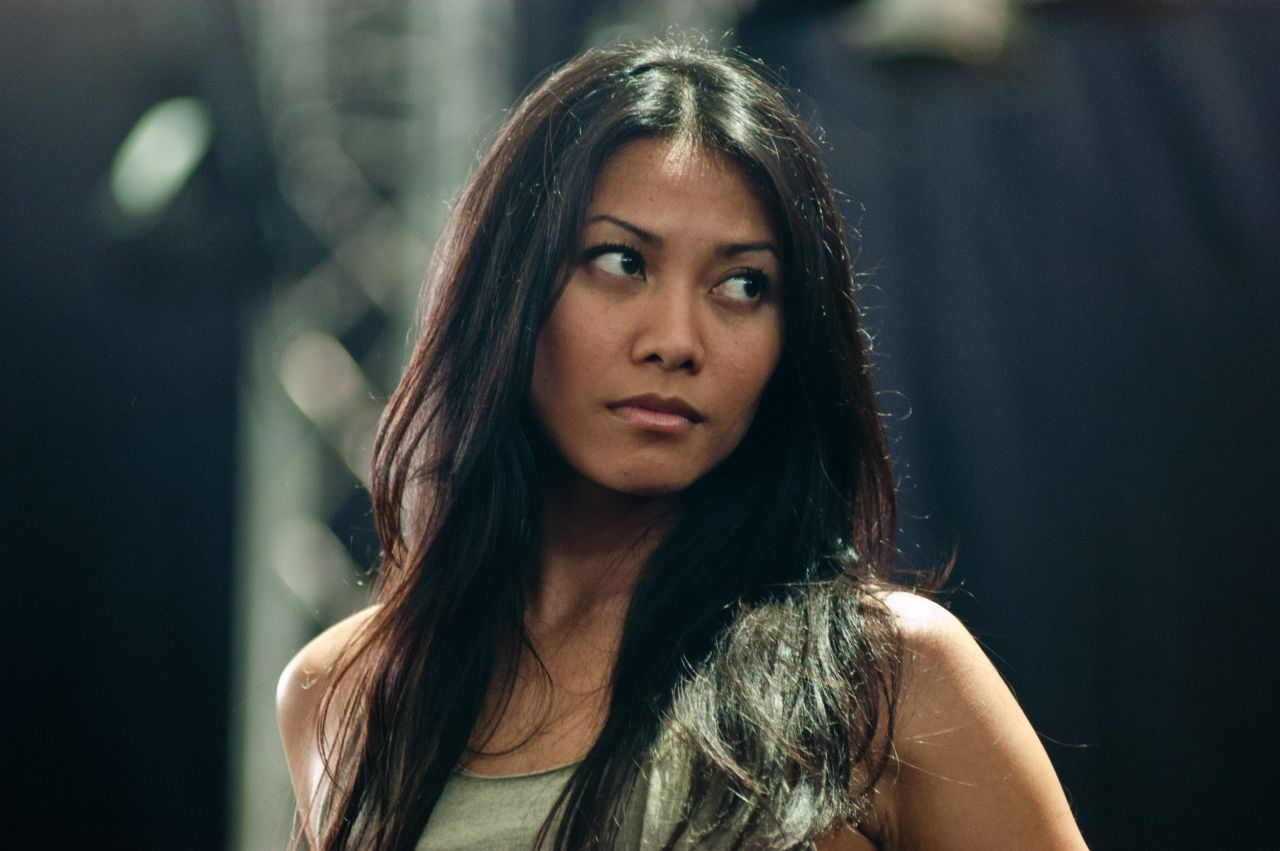
Anggun at Fete de l'Espoir, Geneva, Switzerland, in May 2005

"Undress Me" was chosen as the first single from the English version. Unaccompanied by a music video, it debuted at 13 in Italy, becoming her fifth top 20 single there. It became Anggun's first hit in the Middle East and Balkans. "In Your Mind" was released as the second single, becoming a hit in Asia. The third single, "Saviour", was used as the soundtrack for the U.S. box office number-one film Transporter 2.

Anggun was awarded the Chevalier des Arts et Lettres (Knight of Arts and Letters) by the French Minister of Culture for her achievements and support of French culture. She was appointed as the ambassadress for a Swiss watch brand, Audemars Piguet. Anggun did a duet with Julio Iglesias on a reworked version of "All of You" in Indonesian version for his album Romantic Classics (2006). On 25 May 2006, Anggun performed on her sold-out solo concert at the Jakarta Convention Center, entitled Konser Untuk Negeri. She later on toured to few cities in Indonesia, such as Medan and Bandung.

In August 2006, Anggun released the special edition of both the French and English versions of Luminescence with three new songs. "Juste avant toi", the new single from the special edition, became Anggun's fourth Top 40 hit, peaking at number 28 on the French Singles Chart. Meanwhile, its English version, "I'll Be Alright", became her most popular Russophone hit with over 43,000 airplays from more than 350 radio stations across the region. Luminescence was re-issued in February 2007 and peaked at number three on the French Back Catalogue Chart. In September 2006, Anggun performed her song, "Cesse la pluie" at Sopot Music Festival Grand Prix in Sopot, Poland.

In December 2006, Anggun was named Best International Artist at Anugerah Musik Indonesia for introducing Indonesian music to the international recording industry. She released her Best-Of album in Indonesia and Malaysia, which compiled singles during the first decade of her international career. The new version of "Mimpi" was released as a radio single and became a hit in Indonesia in 2006 to 2007. Anggun released Best-Of for the Italian market with a different track listing and "I'll Be Alright" as its lead single. She was featured on German band Reamonn's single "Tonight".

During the year, Anggun participated in environmental projects. She became the French-language narrator of BBC nature documentary film Earth (Un jour sur Terre), and composed its soundtrack single, "Un jour sur terre". She was appointed as the Ambassador of the Micro-environment Prize by the French Ministry of Ecology and Sustainable Development and National Geographic Channel. Anggun was awarded Le grand cœur de l'année (The Great Heart of the Year) by French television network Filles TV for her contribution to social and environmental events. In February 2007, Anggun was invited as the guest star on an episode of the fourth season of Star Academy Arab World in Lebanon. She returned to another episode of the show's fifth season in the following year. She did a duet with Italian singer Roby Facchinetti and his son, Francesco Facchinetti in a song, titled Vivere Normale. Then, she has been invited to sing it at an Italian music festival, the 57th Sanremo Music Festival. In March 2007, she did a number performance with Nicole Croisille and sang Croisille's hit "Une femme avec toi" on Symphonic Show for Sidaction. In December 2007, she received her second invitation from the Vatican to perform in the Christmas concert in Verona, Italy, along with Michael Bolton. She covered Bruce Springsteen's "Streets of Philadelphia" with Corsican group I Muvrini for their album I Muvrini et les 500 choristes (2007). She was featured on the remix version of DJ Laurent Wolf's number-one hit "No Stress" for the deluxe edition of his album Wash My World. Anggun and Wolf performed the song at the 2008 World Music Awards in Monaco.

In 2008, Anggun released her fourth international studio album, Elevation. It experimented with urban and hip hop. Elevation was produced by hip hop producer pair Tefa & Masta. "Crazy" was released as the lead single from the album, with its French and Indonesian versions, "Si tu l'avoues" and "Jadi Milikmu", serving as the first single there. Canadian cinematographer Ivan Grbovic directed its music videos; it charted at 6 on Francophonie Diffusion Chart. Another single from this album, called "My Man" or in the French version, "Si je t'emmène" topped to number 11 on the same chart. This song featured rappers Pras Michel from the Fugees. The music video for its versions was directed by Jean-Baptiste Erreca. Anggun, with this album, had made her music travel to Russia with positive reactions there. In Russia, Elevation was released with an additional song, "О нас с тобой (O Nas S Toboyu)", which was recorded as a duet with Russian singer Max Lorens. Later, she remade the song in English, called "No Song", and Indonesian, called "Berganti Hati". For "Berganti Hati", she was helped by Indonesian director Jay Subiyakto to make the music video. Prior to its official release, the album was certified double platinum, making it the fastest-selling album of her career in Indonesia. In France, the album debuted at 36 on the French Albums Chart. Later, one of her songs in this album, "Stronger", was chosen to be Anlene's advertisement soundtrack for Southeast Asia territory. For the Asian Edition album, she included a song written by Morgan Visconti and Rosi Golan, "Shine". Pantene used this for the soundtrack of its short movie commercial. On 6 December 2008, Anggun joined the jury for Miss France 2009.

Anggun's four-year ambassador contract with Audemars Piguet was extended, and she was chosen by hair care brand, Pantene, and New Zealand-based dairy product, Anlene, as their ambassador. In 2009, Italian singer Mina did a cover from one of Anggun's songs, "A Rose in the Wind", in her album Riassunti d'amore - Mina Cover. Anggun made a promo tour called Anggun Elevation Acoustic Showcase and served only 200 guest seats on 24 & 27 March 2009 at Hotel Istana, Kuala Lumpur. She made concerts in Indonesia and toured the cities of Bandung, Yogyakarta, Denpasar, Surabaya and Medan. In August 2009, she was invited to perform her song "Saviour" at New Wave 2009 in Jūrmala, Latvia. On 16 October 2009, she attended FAO World Food Day event, called All is Possible, at 4th International Rome Film Festival.

=== 2010–2013: Echoes, Eurovision, and The X Factor ===
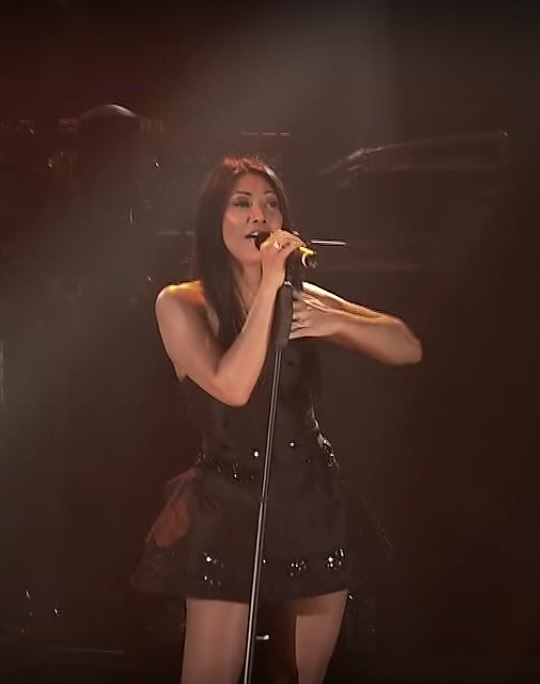
Anggun performing in Hannover, Germany, during the Schiller's Atemlos Tour in May 2010

In early 2010, Anggun recorded a duet with Portuguese singer Mickael Carreira on the song "Chama por me (Call My Name)", as well as performing at his concert in Lisbon, Portugal on 26 February 2010. She collaborated with German electronica musician Schiller, co-writing and contributing lead vocals to two tracks, "Always You" and "Blind", for his album Atemlos (2010). Anggun appeared Schiller's concert series, Atemlos Tour, in 14 cities in Germany during May 2010. Anggun did a cameo for 2010 French drama film Ces amours-là directed by Claude Lelouch.

Anggun's fifth international studio album—Echoes for the English version and Échos for the French version—saw her collaboration with composers Gioacchino Maurici, Pierre Jaconelli, Jean-Pierre Pilot, and William Rousseau. It became her first self-produced international album and was released under her own record label, April Earth. The English version was released in Indonesia in May 2011. It topped the Indonesian Albums Chart and was certified platinum in its first week. It eventually became the best-selling pop album of 2011, with quadruple platinum certification. On this stage, Anggun had won 56 platinum records in 26 countries, from "Snow on the Sahara" to "Echo (You and I)". "Only Love" and its Indonesian version "Hanyalah Cinta" were released as the lead singles and became number-one radio hits. The French version was released in November 2011 and reached number 48 on the French Albums Chart. "Je partirai", the first single for the French version, reached number five in Belgium. Anggun held her second major concert at the Jakarta Convention Center, Konser Kilau Anggun, on 27 November 2011. She later appeared for the third time at the Christmas concert in the Vatican.

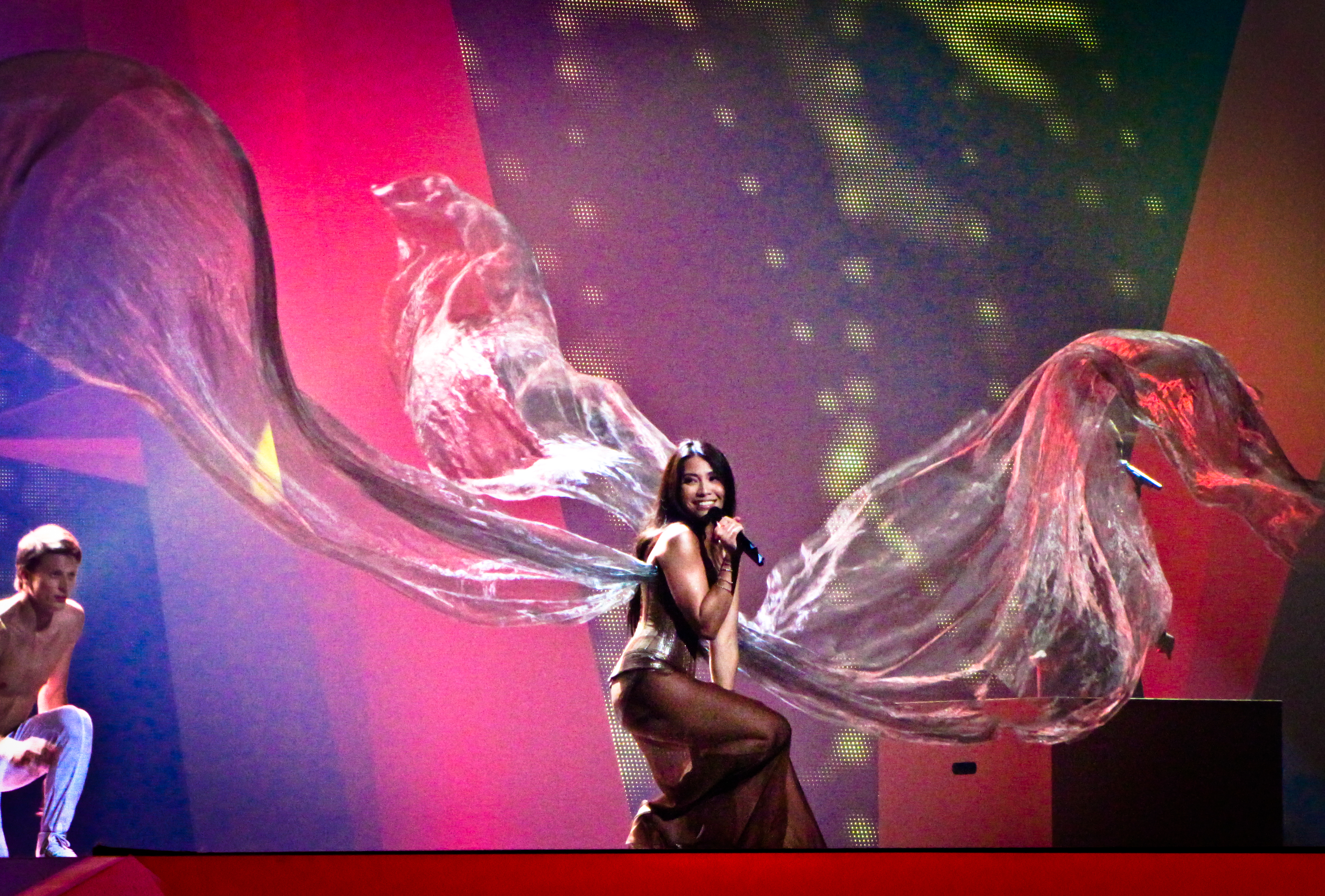
Anggun performing at the grand final of the Eurovision Song Contest 2012 in Baku, Azerbaijan on 26 May 2012.

Anggun was chosen by France Télévisions to represent France in the Eurovision Song Contest 2012. She co-wrote the entry, "Echo (You and I)", with William Rousseau and Jean-Pierre Pilot. Anggun toured more than 15 countries in Europe to promote the song. The song finished in 22nd place.

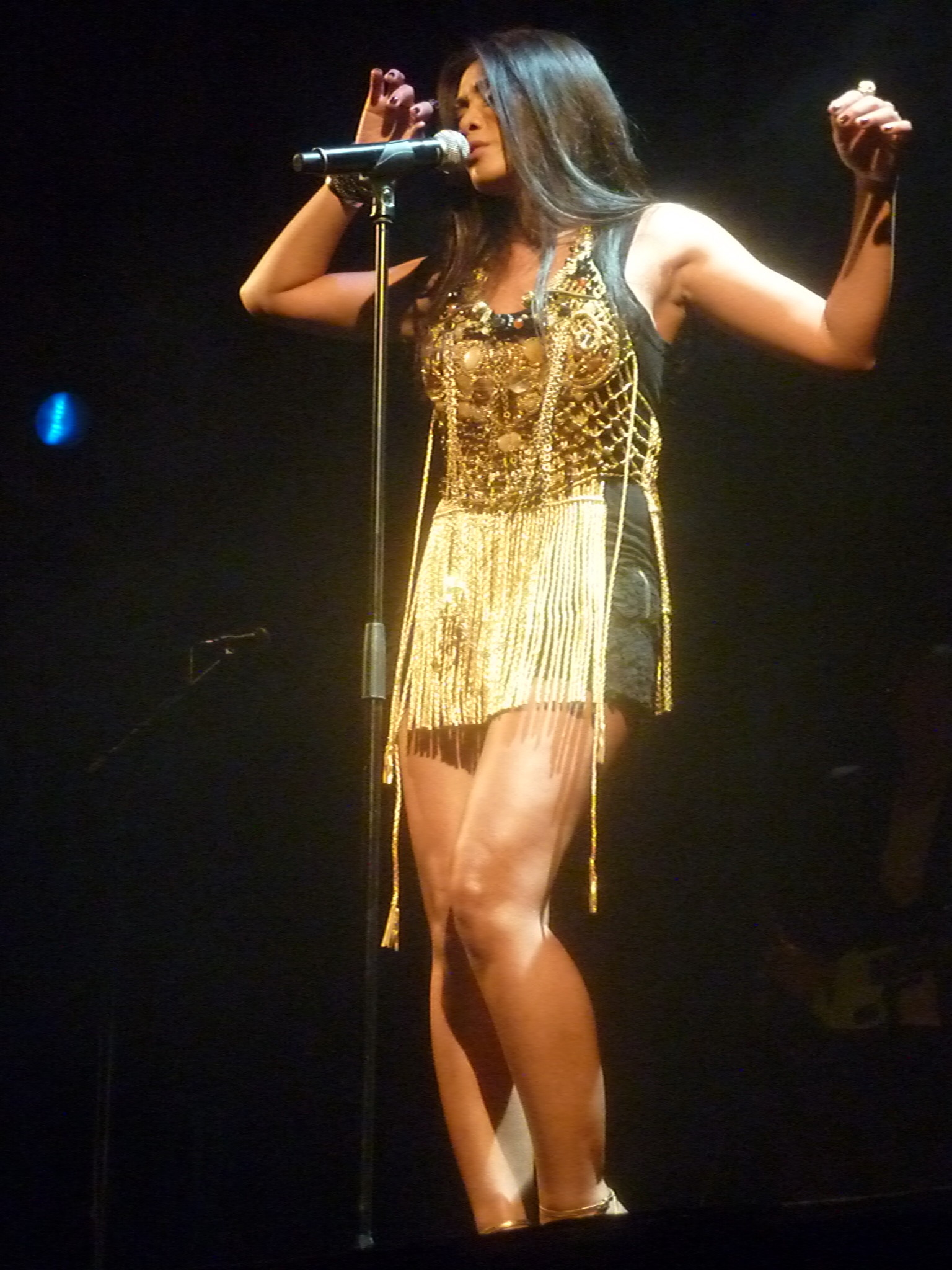
Anggun in concert at Le Trianon, Paris in June 2012

In March 2012, she released the international edition of Echoes. She embarked on a concert tour in several cities across France, Switzerland and New Caledonia, including her sold-out concert in Le Trianon, Paris, on 13 June 2012. Anggun joined United Nations campaign, Earth Day: Save the Forest in Italy. On Valentine's Day that year, she appeared as the guest artist at Lara Fabian's concert special on MTV Lebanon, where they sang the duet "Tu es mon autre". Anggun toured 10 cities in Germany with Schiller in late 2012. Anggun performed at Les Fous Chantants festival in Alès, France. In this event, she was accompanied by 1,000 choirs. At the end of 2012, she was appointed by Director of Indosat, Erik Meijer, as brand ambassador of Indosat Mentari Paket Smartphone.

In 2013, Anggun served as the international judge for the first season of the Indonesian version of The X Factor, making her the highest-paid judge in Indonesian television history. It became the year's highest-rated talent show in Indonesia. Anggun was lauded by public and critics. She joined the judging panel of the television special X Factor Around the World on 24 August 2013. She participated on the concept album entitled Thérèse – Vivre d'amour, for which she recorded two duets—"Vivre d'amour" and "La fiancée"—with Canadian singer Natasha St-Pier. Released in April 2013, the project topped the French Physical Albums Chart with platinum record (sold 100,000 copies). In May 2013, Anggun released a greatest hits album entitled Best-Of: Design of a Decade 2003–2013. In this year, Olay management and Procter & Gamble chose Anggun to be ambassador of Olay Total Effect. She and Natasha St-Pier were invited to sing in front of Pope Francis on 7 December 2013 at Concerto di Natale XXI edizione in Auditorium della Conciliazione, Rome.

At the 2013 Taormina Film Fest in Italy, she was presented with the Taormina Special Award for her humanitarian works as the FAO Goodwill Ambassador. Anggun with David Foster, alongside Ruben Studdard, Michael Johns, David Cook, and Nicole Scherzinger performed on David Foster & Friends Private Concert in Jakarta. She sang three songs, including Whitney Houston's hits, "I Will Always Love You", "I Have Nothing" and her own song, "Snow on the Sahara". She did a photoshoot and interview with VOGUE Italia in November 2013. She wore Azzaro's and Louis Vuitton's stellar. The same month she was appointed by President of Paris Saint-Germain (PSG) Nasser Al-Khelaifi to be the ambassador of the club. On 22 November 2013, she joined French General Manager of PSG Jean-Claude Blanc and Indonesia's ambassador to France Rezlan Ishar Jenie to launch the club official site with Indonesian language for Indonesian Les Parisiens which Anggun was the icon of this site. She received the number 10 jersey, PSG striker Zlatan Ibrahimović's number.

=== 2014–2016: Got Talent and Toujours un ailleurs ===
In 2014, Anggun re-recorded her debut international single as a French-Portuguese duet with Tony Carreira, retitled "La neige au Sahara (Faço Chover No Deserto)", for Carreira's album Nos fiançailles, France/Portugal. The duo performed the song at the 2014 World Music Awards in Monaco, where Anggun was awarded the World's Best-Selling Indonesian Artist. In late 2014, Anggun recorded two duets: "Who Wants to Live Forever" with Il Divo for their album A Musical Affair and "Pour une fois" with Vincent Niclo for his album Ce que je suis. Anggun released "Fly My Eagle" as soundtrack for the film Pendekar Tongkat Emas. Anggun performed in Africa twice during 2014, for Roberto Cavalli's Casa Fashion Show in Casablanca, Morocco, and for the 15th annual French-speaking World Summit in Dakar, Senegal. She was invited by Pope Francis to attend at a Christmas concert at the Basilica of Saint Francis of Assisi on 25 December 2014.

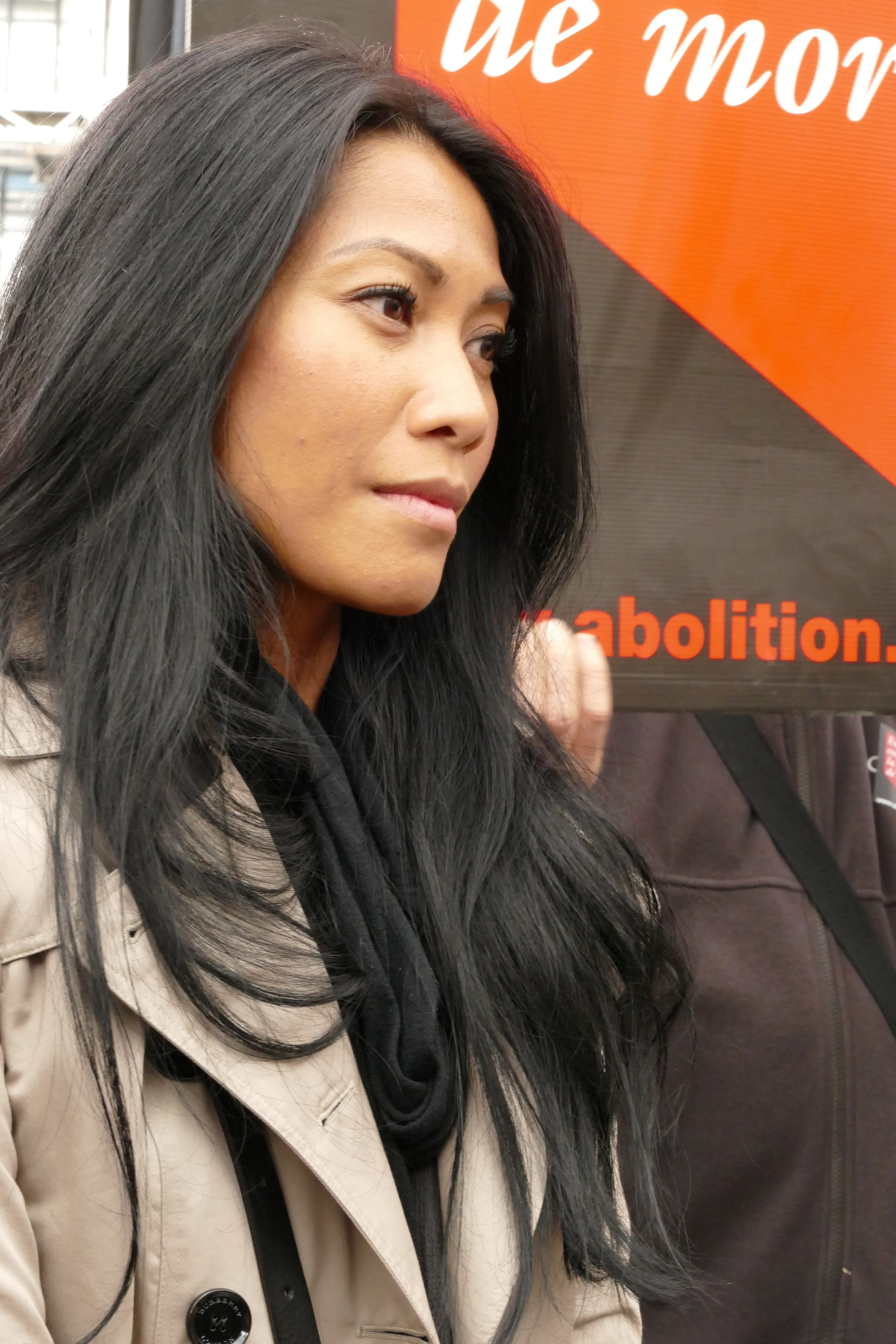
Anggun in Paris, France, on 25 April 2015.

Anggun was recruited to the judging panel for Syco's franchise, Indonesia's Got Talent in 2014. To prepare, she received instruction from Simon Cowell during the set of Britain's Got Talent. The next year, Anggun served as a judge on the inaugural season of the continent-wide Asia's Got Talent, alongside David Foster, Melanie C of the Spice Girls and Vanness Wu of F4. Joined by contestants from 15 countries in Asia, the show premiered on AXN Asia on 12 March 2015. The Asian Academy of Music Arts and Sciences appointed Anggun to its board of governors, and its first ambassador. At the 2015 Anugerah Planet Muzik in Singapore, she received the International Breakthrough Artist Award for being the first globally successful act from Malay-speaking world.

SK-II and Harper's Bazaar Indonesia honored Anggun as one of 15 Most Inspiring Women. She joined the SK-II's Change Destiny campaign and became a spokesperson alongside actress Cate Blanchett and Michelle Phan for its event in Los Angeles. In 2016, Anggun sat on the panel as judges for SK-II Beauty Bound Indonesia. In June 2015, she was invited by Michael Bolton to perform a duet and as an opening act at his concert in Kasablanka Concert Hall, Jakarta. She joined the jury panel for Miss France 2016 on 19 December 2015.

Anggun's sixth French-language studio album, Toujours un ailleurs, was released in November 2015 by TF1 Musique under Universal Music Group. Produced by Frédéric Chateau and Grammy Award-winning producer Brian Rawling, the album features guest vocals by Florent Pagny and Angélique Kidjo. It became Anggun's most successful album in France since Luminescence (2005), charting for 24 weeks on the French Albums Chart and sold over 50,000 copies. It became her best-charting album in Belgium, debuting at number 43 and remaining on the chart for 31 weeks. To promote the album, Anggun embarked on a 23-date concert tour across France and Belgium. The album yielded the singles "Nos vies parallèles" and "Perfect World", the latter of which became a top-five hit on the US Dance Club Songs chart.

She performed two duet songs with Siti Nurhaliza on a concert titled Dato' Siti Nurhaliza & Friends Concert on April 2, 2016, in Stadium Negara, Kuala Lumpur, Malaysia. In July 2016, she became second most influent person on Twitter in France. She being invited to have a role as a columnist and guest radio host on Europe 1 radio show, called Les Pieds dans le plat, by Cyril Hanouna. Anggun received the Key to the City award from Dario Nardella, the Mayor of Florence, Italy. Anggun was featured on new-age music group Enigma's eight studio album The Fall of a Rebel Angel (2016), providing lead vocals for three songs, including the lead single "Sadeness (Part II)". In October 2016, Anggun was featured on Kotak's song "Teka-Teki", which was nominated for Best Pop Collaboration at the 2017 Anugerah Musik Indonesia. She peformed a duet with Lara Fabian on the song "J'y crois encore" at Fabian's concert Ma vie dans la tienne Tour 2016 in Brussels, Belgium. In December 2016, Anggun performed at the Christmas concert in Parco della Musica, Rome, Italy.

=== 2017–2021: 8, The Voice, Mask Singer, and acting debut ===
Anggun returned as a judge on the second season of Asia's Got Talent, alongside David Foster and Jay Park. Her sixth English-language studio album, 8, was launched at the Apple Store on Orchard Road in Singapore on 8 December 2017, with an acoustic showcase. The albums singles, "What We Remember" and "The Good Is Back", reached the top ten and top twenty on the US Dance Club Songs chart, respectively. She was invited for the seventh time by Pope Francis and Vatican to perform on 4 January 2018 in Naples, Italy. In July 2018, she performed at the European Latin Awards at Stadio Benito Stirpe, Frosinone, Italy, where she won Best International Singer category.

In March 2018, Anggun performed with David Foster during The Hitman: David Foster and Friends concert series in Surakarta and Surabaya, Indonesia. Anggun performed the song "Pemuda" at the opening ceremony of the Asian Games 2018 at the Gelora Bung Karno Stadium, Jakarta. She joined the coaching panel for the third season of The Voice Indonesia. Anggun was featured in the documentary Silent Night — A Song for the World directed by Hannes M. Schalle. She made soundtracks on two versions of "Silent Night" gospel, "Malam Kudus" in Indonesian and "Douce nuit, sainte nuit" in French. In early 2019, Anggun embarked on a seven-date intimate tour across Italy. Anggun did a virtual duet with Luciano Pavarotti at The Luciano Pavarotti Foundation and Anggun in concert at the Simfonia Hall in Jakarta.

Anggun became a panelist on Mask Singer, reaching nearly 7 million viewers. She returned for another season of the show. She returned for Asia's Got Talent Season 3. In January 2020, she attended the 24th Asian Television Awards in Manila, Philippines where she performed and was awarded Outstanding Contribution to Asian Television Performing Arts. Due to the global pandemic of COVID-19, she had to postpone her tour from the end of 2019 until the beginning of 2020. However, she began a career in acting. She took a part as Maleen Suthama in television movie drama Coup de foudre à Bangkok. The production was taken in February 2020 in Bangkok, Thailand. Anggun returned as panelist on the second season of Mask Singer alongside her previous colleague panelists. In June 2020, RIFFX by Crédit Mutuel published the result of a survey, titled "Barometer: Les 100 Artistes Préférés des Français (Barometer: The 100 Favorite Artists of The French)", which Anggun listed on number 97. This survey was conducted by YouGov with interviewing 1,006 French people (age min. 18 years old) on 1 June to 2 June 2020. Musical documentary Silent Night — A Song for the World, re-produced by The CW and took a date on 10 December 2020 for its special premiere.

Her duet with Italian tenor Luciano Pavarotti made a great scene in European classical music market. Anggun attended The 3rd BraVo International Classical Music Awards on April 2, 2021, at Bolshoi Theatre, Moscow, Russia. She made a performance with virtual image Luciano Pavarotti and sang "Caruso". At that event, she received a Duet of the Year award because of her duet on "Caruso" performances. She continued the postponed Italy tour concert, starting in Sassuolo on 11 September 2021.

Anggun acted in ninth season of detective-crime film TV series Léo Matteï, Brigade des mineurs (Léo Matteï, miners' brigade). In June 2021, she was chosen to fill her voice as Virana in Disney movie Raya et le Dernier Dragon, a French version of Raya and the Last Dragon. Anggun also made her appearance as herself in online series called Profession Comédien on episode 48. She and all previous season's panelist returned on the third season of Mask Singer and started the production in June 2021. She began shooting television variety show series called les Reines du Shopping spéciale Célébrités in September 2021. Anggun was invited to perform for the Opening Ceremony of 2021 National Paralympic Week at Mandala Stadium in Jayapura, Papua. Anggun sang Indonesia's national anthem "Indonesia Raya" alongside 150 Papuan children and her 90's hit "Mimpi", all orchestrated by Indonesian conductor Addie MS. Anggun was invited by Vatican to perform at Concerto di Natale: Ventinovesima XXIX Edizione in Auditorium della Conciliazione.

=== 2022–present: Theatres, Levitating, and Reacher ===
Anggun participated on comedy-musical theatre show with broadway vibe, Al Capone. She acted as Lili, Al Capone's mistress. It will be directed by opera manager and Opéra de Monte-Carlo director Jean-Louis Grinda, composed by Jean-Félix Lalanne. The show was performed on 93 dates at Folies Bergère between January and July 2023. The first screening was in April 2022. The album was released on 30 September 2022 on digital music platforms. In June 2022, Mayor of Surakarta Gibran Rakabuming Raka held a fashion exhibition and showcase called Java in Paris, with Anggun performing as a Javan female folk-singer, named sinden. On 23 September 2022, Anggun joined a project, with Lorenzo Licitra, as a featured artist on the theme song and campaign for the 12th Festival del Cinema Nuovo, the international competition for short films played by disabled people, which was held in Bergamo, Italy. The song called "Eli Hallo" which written by Lorenzo Licitra and Giovanni Segreti Bruno. Anggun was a supporting artist on the French version of Studytracks app for schoolchildren.

Anggun played Teacher Asri in Wregas Bhanuteja's supernatural drama film Levitating. It had its world premiere on 24 January 2026 at the 2026 Sundance Film Festival. Her performance was critically acclaimed and made her a National Winner for Best Actress in a Leading Role at the 9th Asian Academy Creative Awards. Anggun starred as Amisha Hoth in the season 4 of Reacher, premiered on August 12, 2026. The season amassed 66 million viewers globally in its first 28 days on Prime Video. Anggun was honored with the Officier des Arts et des Lettres from the Government of France.

== Artistry and legacy ==
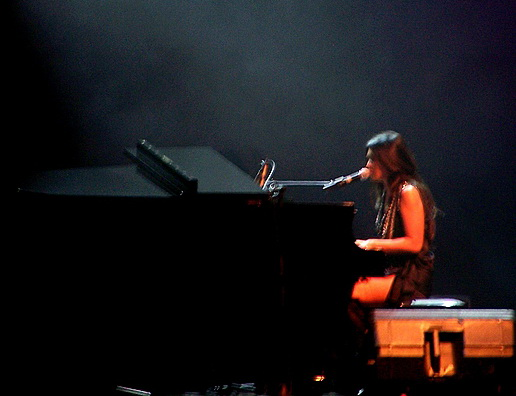
Anggun playing piano during her 2006 concert in Bandung, Indonesia.

Anggun possesses a three-octave contralto voice, which has been described as "husky", "soulful", and "distinctive" by music critics. Chuck Taylor from Billboard commented: "Vocally, Anggun is a fortress of power, easing from a delicate whisper into a brand of cloud-parting fortitude commonly associated with grade-A divas." John Everson from The SouthtownStar noted that "Anggun is gifted with a warm, full voice that can tackle slight pop songs without overpowering them as well as swoop with depth and ease over heavier emotional numbers." Anggun received her first songwriting credit at the age of twelve on her debut album Dunia Aku Punya (1986). Anggun said, "I was writing songs all the time, but my specialty was classical piano and singing."

Anggun started as a rock singer and given nickname as "Lady Rocker" in Indonesia, and was influenced by rock bands such as Guns N' Roses, Bon Jovi, and Megadeth. She was a big fan of Metallica. After her initial international success, she showed her versatility by changing her musical style for each album. Her later influences cover a wide range of styles from jazz to pop, extending from Joni Mitchell to Madonna. She told VOGUE Italia that she listened to wide range of artists from The Beatles to David Bowie, Billie Holiday to Leonard Cohen, up to Dave Grohl, P!nk and Bruno Mars. Anggun identified Nine Inch Nails' The Fragile (1999) as "the album that changed my life" and the band's frontman Trent Reznor as "the man of my musical life." Her other musical influences include Tracy Chapman, Sheila Chandra and Sting. Anggun, who studied Balinese dance since childhood, uses the traditional art in her performances.

Anggun's image has been compared to that of Pocahontas. Some international articles and magazines give a nickname for Anggun as "Indonesian Madonna (Madonna Indonésienne)" or even "Madonna from Asia (Madonna de l'Asie)". At the early stage of her career as a rock singer, Anggun was known for her tomboy look—wearing a crooked beret, shorts, studded jacket, and large belt; this set a trend during the early 1990s. Later, she has focused on her femininity and sexuality, emphasising her long black hair and brown skin. For this look she uses the work of fashion designers like Roberto Cavalli, Azzedine Alaïa, Jean Paul Gaultier, Dolce & Gabbana, and many more. Other couture fashion designers that Anggun often wears include Givenchy, Elie Saab, Victoria Beckham, Georges Chakra, Tony Ward, Blumarine, and Zuhair Murad. She also stated that most likely to wear high-heels and Louboutin's suits her. In 2001, Anggun was ranked No. 6 in a list of Sexiest Women of Asia by FHM magazine. Later in 2010, she was ranked at number 18 on the French version of FHM's list of 100 Sexiest Women in the World.

When promoting her first international album in the United States, she was reportedly offered a role as a Bond Girl in The World Is Not Enough, as well as in High Fidelity. Anggun declined to be labeled an actress and said, "I was born a singer. I won't go into another profession, because I think there are still many people out there who were born to be movie stars or models. My calling is music." As for commercials, she tends to be selective when choosing products to promote.

Anggun's success in Europe and America has been credited with helping other Asian singers such as Coco Lee, Hikaru Utada, and Tata Young. Malaysian singer Yuna asked Anggun for guidance when launching her recording career in the United States in 2011 and supporting each other career since then. Ian De Cotta from Singapore newspaper Today called her the "Voice of Asia" as well as "Southeast Asia's international singing sensation." Filipino music journalist Lionel Zivan S. Valdellon described Anggun as "a very good ambassadress for Indonesia and Asia in general". Regarding the role of Asia in the Western music industry, Anggun said "I think it's about time people know something more about Asia, not only as a vacation place."

== Other activities ==
=== Philanthropy and activism ===
Since 1997, Angun has actively supported charitable causes, such as the fight against AIDS, tolerance between cultures, and the natural environment.

=== Ambassadorship ===
She was appointed as the spokesperson for the International Year of Microcredit, a United Nations program aimed at eradicating debt in the third world, In 2009, Anggun was appointed as the Goodwill Ambassador for the Food and Agriculture Organization (FAO), part of the United Nations. On 15 October 2009, she performed on the occasion of the World Food Day Ceremony at UN headquarters Plenary Hall in New York, New York. She attended Rome Film Festival on the next day and spoke as UN Goodwill Ambassador at TeleFood Campaign Against Hunger in The World. Anggun as FAO Goodwill Ambassador have been named by the United Nations as MDG Champions on 1 September 2010. The announcement was made at UN headquarters in New York. FAO Goodwill Ambassadors, such as Italian actor Raoul Bova, Canadian singer Céline Dion, Filipino singer Lea Salonga and American actress Susan Sarandon, spoke with one voice in an urgent appeal on behalf of the more than one billion people living in chronic hunger worldwide. Anggun, who has appeared in a French film, promoted one of the campaigns she participated in, namely The One Billion Hungry Project. It is a program from FAO to raise awareness of world hunger. She performed "Snow on the Sahara" at the campaign's concert on 19 September 2010 in New York. She got an interview with CNN to talk about this campaign on the same date. Anggun supported the MDG Summit in New York on 22 September 2010. In November 2011, she made a speech at the UN Summit in China.

=== Writing ===
Anggun wrote her views on several issues, especially in Indonesia, on online platforms Qureta.com and DW. She had more than 150,000 online readers. Mostly she discussed social, humanity, and tolerance topics. On DW, she wrote an article titled "Komunisme dan Emosi Yang Bertautan di Indonesia (Communism and Emotions Are Linked in Indonesia)".

== Personal life ==
In 2000, Anggun became a French citizen, thus automatically renouncing her 26-year Indonesian citizenship. Despite being a naturalised French citizen, she still refers to herself as an Indonesian. Anggun has voiced her support for dual citizenship, which is not yet legally allowed in Indonesia.

Anggun was raised a Muslim:

Saya lahir di negara Islam. Saya Islam. Tapi saya sangat prihatin kalau negara saya jadi terbelakang seperti itu. Karena Islam itu mengenal yang namanya toleransi. Saya tidak mendukung negara yang bikin generasi mudanya frustrasi.
I was born in a Muslim country. I am Muslim. But I'm very concerned that my country is becoming backward in this way. Because Islam is known as a tolerant religion. I don't support countries that frustrate the young generation.

— Anggun's talk at the Jakarta Convention Center

She states that she does not have a rigid point of view about religion and leans towards Buddhism without breaking with religious belief. In 2025, She visited Borobudur, the world's largest Buddhist temple. She feels strongly about religious tolerance and insists on separation of religious faith from the basic regulative principle for the individual:

For me, the most important thing is not what religion you believe in but how you do things, how you live your life.

Your belief doesn't determine whether you're a good person or not—your behavior does.

Anggun has been married four times. Her first marriage, in 1992, was to Michel Georgea, a French engineer, which was met with criticism in Indonesia for allegedly marrying to advance her career. Her second husband was Louis-Olivier Maury (born March 1972) whom she met in Canada. They married in 2004. When that marriage ended in 2006, she began a relationship with French writer Cyril Montana, whom she eventually married. She gave birth to her first child, a daughter named Kirana Cipta Montana, on 8 November 2007. She and Montana divorced in 2015. On 16 August 2018 Anggun married for the fourth time in Ubud, Bali, with a German musician and photographer, Christian Kretschmar.

Besides Indonesian, her native language, Anggun is fluent in French and English.

=== Paris burglary incidents ===
According to Closer, Anggun's apartment in Paris was robbed by burglars on 18 September 2015 when she was not in Paris. The burglars stole jewelry and high value items valued at a total amount of around €250,000. Her home was burgled again on 6 December 2021 while she and her family were on vacation in Italy: three male suspects managed to slip into the apartment in the 8th arrondissement of Paris through a window. The robbers stole several luxury items belonging to Anggun, including bags and watches. The property damage also amounted to €80,000.

== Backing band ==
Current members

- Fabrice Ach – bassist, backing vocals (2001–present)
- Olivier Freche – lead guitarist, rhythm guitarist, backing vocals (2004–2011, 2013–present)
- Jean-Marie Négozio – keyboardist, backing vocals (2003, 2006–present)
- Olivier Baldissera – drummer, percussionist (2008–present)
- Stéphane Escoms – back-up keyboardist, backing vocals (2020 (on Italia & Russia tour concerts)–present)

Former members

- Patrick Buchmann – drummer, percussionist, backing vocals (1997–2004)
- Nicolas-Yvan Mingot – lead guitarist (1997–2000)
- Yannick Hardouin – bassist (1997–2001)
- Patrice Clémentin – keyboardist (1997–2002)
- Serge Bouchard – back-up bassist (1999 (on Asia Tour))
- Cyril Tarquiny – lead guitarist, rhythm guitarist, backing vocals (2001–2003, 2006–2007, 2010–2012, 2020 (on Russia tour))
- Gilard – keyboardist, backing vocals (2004–2005)
- Claude Sarragossa – drummer, percussionist (2005–2007)
- Romain Berrodier – back-up keyboardist, backing vocals (2014–2015)
- Frédéric Degré – back-up drummer (2019 (on Prambanan Jazz Festival and Gemilang 30 Tahun Concert))

== In popular culture ==
Anggun became the first Indonesian woman to be immortalized in wax by Madame Tussauds in 2016. Located in its Bangkok museum, Anggun's statue joined that of Sukarno, the first President of Indonesia. As of 2022, a total of 19 Anggun records have been added by the Indonesian Music Museum for preservation, the seventh most total among musicians from Jakarta. The museum also selected her among the ten greatest Indonesian female musicians in history, spanning 1920s to 2000s.

A cocktail named after Anggun is served in Bar 228, Hôtel Meurice de Calais, Paris. It is made of Bacardi rum, mango coulis, coconut milk, and pineapple juice.

A variety of rose named and christened after Anggun by Meilland International SA at Château de Bagatelle. The rose "Anggun" is a derivative of Meibokir variety which has special characteristics. This variety of flower has 40 white-colored petals with a mint-fruity scent and blooms from spring to winter.

== Discography ==
Indonesian-language studio albums

- Dunia Aku Punya (1986)
- Kepada Alam dan Pencintanya (recorded 1983, released 1990)
- Anak Putih Abu Abu (1991)
- Nocturno (1992)
- Anggun C. Sasmi... Lah!!! (1993)

French-language studio albums

- Au nom de la lune (1997)
- Désirs contraires (2000)
- Luminescence (2005)
- Élévation (2008)
- Échos (2011)
- Toujours un ailleurs (2015)

English-language studio albums

- Snow on the Sahara (1997)
- Chrysalis (2000)
- Luminescence (2005)
- Elevation (2008)
- Echoes (2011)
- 8 (2017)

== Filmography ==
Film

- Un jour sur Terre (Earth) (2007)
- Ces amours-là (What War May Bring) (2010)
- Peuples autochtone: Notre Combat (2015)
- Les Pensées de Paul (2015)
- Silent Night: A Song for the World (2020)
- Coup de foudre à Bangkok (2020)
- Raya and the Last Dragon (2021)
- Levitating (2026)

Television program, series, and reality show

- Operet Lebaran di Gang Kelinci (1984-1986)
- Sessions at West 54th (1997)
- The Rosie O'Donnell Show (1998)
- Les Enfoirés: Dernière Édition avant l'an 2000 (1999)
- E-Classement (2011): as host
- On a tout essayé (2005)
- Hit Machine (2006, 2022)
- 93 Fauborg Saint-Honoré (2006)
- Star Academy (2005, 2008, 2024)
- Muppets TV (2006)
- Star Academy Arabia (2007 & 2008)
- Akademi Fantasia (2007 & 2009)
- Les femmes en chansons (2008)
- Miss France (2008 & 2015)
- La Boîte à Musique (2009)
- Chabada (2011, 2012, 2013)
- Village Départ (2011, 2013, 2015, 2016)
- Téléthon (2011)
- N'oubliez pas les paroles (2011)
- MasterChef Indonesia (season 3) (2013): as guest
- X Factor Indonesia (season 1) (2013)
- Indonesia's Got Talent (season 2) (2014)
- Le Grand Show (2014)
- Le plus grand cabaret du monde (2014)
- Du côte chez Dave (2014, 2015, 2016)
- Asia's Got Talent (2015 - 2019)
- 50 minutes inside (2015, 2020, 2022)
- Touche pas à mon poste! (2015, 2018)
- Les Grands du rire (2015, 2016)
- Stars sous hypnose (2015, 2016, 2022)
- Gala de l'Union (2016) as Morticia Addams
- Money Drop (2016)
- Le Grand Blind Test (2016)
- Même le dimanche (2016, 2017)
- Folie Passagère (2016)
- Dan Late Show (2017)
- Tonight Show (2017)
- DiCaire Show (2017)
- The Voice Indonesia (season 3) (2018)
- Notre-Dame de Paris, le grand concert (2019)
- Les Années bonheur
- Mask Singer (Le Chanteur Masqué) (2019 - 2022, 2024 (Christmas Edition))
- 300 choeurs pour + de vie
- Good Singers (season 1 & 3) (2020 & 2022)
- AXN All Stars (2020)
- Tous en cuisine avec Cyril Lignac (2020)
- les Reines du Shopping spéciale Célébrités (2021)
- Merci Line (2021)
- Chantant Aznavour (2021)
- Allez viens je t'emmène dans les années Pop (2021)
- Duos Mystere (2021)
- Cuisine ouverte avec Anggun (2021)
- La boîte à secrets (2021, 2023)
- La chanson secrète (2021, 2023)
- Spectaculaire: avec Anggun (France 2) (2022)
- Léo Matteï, Brigade des mineurs (season 9) (2022)
- Le livre favori des Français (2022)
- Stéréo Club (2022)
- La vie secrète des chansons avec Anggun (two episodes) (2022)
- Cannes Confidential (2023)
- Starmaker (season 1) (2023)
- Dream Team, la relève des Stars (season 1) (2023)
- Un voyage en langue française (2023)
- Avec Florent Pagny, tout le monde ELA (2023)
- The Voice Senior Italy (season 4) (2024)
- La Voix (season 10) (2024)
- Un dimanche à la campagne Avec Anggun (2024)
- Télématin (2024)
- Viva Rai2! (2024)
- Les Enfants de la télé (2024)
- Danse avec les stars (season 12) (2022) & (season 13) (as guest) (2025)
- Reacher (season 4 as Amisha Hoth) (2026)
- Drag Race France (Season 4-onward as a main judge) (2026-present)

Musical Theatre

- Al Capone & Les Incorruptibles as Lili (2023)
- Jesus Christ Superstar as Maria Magdalena (2024)

Radio Programme

- Les pieds dans le plat (Europe 1) (2015 - 2016): as columnist
- Les Grosses Têtes (2024): as guest member

Online Series

- SK-II: Beauty Bound Indonesia (2016)
- Profession Comédien (2019)

Soundtrack

Year	Film/TV series	Soundtrack titles
1989	Si Roy	Si Roy, Kamu Hey Kamu, Dosa-Dosaku, Okay, Dumolit
1997	Anastasia	C'est le debut (At the Beginning) ft. Gildas Arzel
1999	Manatea, les perles du Pacifique	La Perle Noir
1999	Passions	On the Breath of An Angel
2000	Help! I'm a Fish	Ton Amour Ocean (Ocean Love)
2001	The Princess and the Marine	On the Breath of An Angel
2001	Anja & Viktor	Rain ft. Jonas Winge Leisner
2002	Open Hearts	Counting Down, Open Your Heart, Little Things
2004	Flatmania	Take Me There, Voir l'envers
2004	Genesis II	Eden, Sacred Silence, Lullaby
2004	le bon, le brute et les Zombies	Human
2005	Transporter 2	Saviour
2007	Earth	Un jour sur Terre, World
2011	Wakfu	Sur tes pas
2014	Pendekar Tongkat Emas (The Golden Cane Warrior)	Fly My Eagle
2015	Les Pensées de Paul	Try
2015	Pondok Pak Cus	Gaya Remaja
2018	My Little Pony: Equestria Girls, Forgotten Friendship	What We Remember
2021	Yuni	Mimpi

== Accolades ==
Year	Award	Category	Recipient	Result
1998	Victoires de la musique	Revelation of the Year	Herself	Nominated
2000	The Cosmopolitan	Asia Women Award	Herself	Won
2003	Cosmopolitan Indonesia	Fun Fearless Female of the Year	Herself	Won
2003	Robert Awards	Best Original Song	"Open Your Heart"	Nominated
2006	AMI Awards	Best International Artist	Herself	Won
2012	Dahsyatnya Awards	Outstanding Guest Star	Herself	Nominated
2013	NRJ Music Award	Best Francophone Group/Duo/Trio/Collective	Génération Goldman Volume 2 (as featured artist)	Nominated
2015	Indonesian Movie Awards	Most Favourite Movie Soundtrack	"Fly My Eagle"	Nominated
2021	Bravo International Classical Music Awards	Duet of the Year	Herself	Won

- 2001: ranked No. 6 in a list of the Sexiest Women of Asia by FHM magazine.
- 2010: FHM 100 Sexiest Women in the World

== Bibliography ==
- Jeffries, Stan (2003). Encyclopedia of world pop music, 1980–2001. Greenwood Press, University of Michigan. ISBN 978-0-313-31547-3.
- Koespradono, Gantyo (1 March 2008). "Mimpi-Mimpi Anggun". Kick Andy: Kumpulan Kisah Inspiratif (in Indonesian). Vol. 1. Bentang Pustaka. pp. 52–61. ISBN 978-979-1227-17-9.
- Redaksi Jogja Bangkit (2010). 100 Great Women: Suara Perempuan Yang Menginspirasi Dunia [100 Great Women: The Voice of the Women that Inspire the World] (in Indonesian). Jogja Bangkit Publisher. pp. 23–24. ISBN 978-602-8620-28-4.
- Routledge (2007). International Who's Who in Popular Music 2007 (9th revised ed.). University of Virginia. ISBN 978-1-85743-417-0.

== See also ==
- List of Indonesian musicians and musical groups
- List of artists who reached number one on the Italian Singles Chart

== Footnotes ==
Awards and achievements
Preceded by Amaury Vassili with "Sognu"	France in the Eurovision Song Contest; 2012	Succeeded by Amandine Bourgeois with "L'enfer et moi"
