= Marcellino Lefrandt =

Indonesian actor (born 1974)

- Born: 19 July 1974 (age 52); Manado, North Sulawesi, Indonesia
- Education: Sam Ratulangi University
- Occupations: Actor; lecturer
- Spouse: Dewi Rezer (m. 2007; div. 2016)
- Children: 2

Marcellino Victor John Lefrandt (born 19 July 1974) is an Indonesian actor and lecturer. He debuted in the 2000 soap opera Bidadari as Bagus.

== Biography ==
Lefrandt was born to a Christian Minahasan family in Manado, Indonesia. He has become publicly known since becoming a finalist in 'Aneka Ria'. Lefrand became a catwalk and photo model. He starred in films, including Jackie, Jacklyn, and Deru Debu alongside Willy Dozan. He has also worked as a singer, appearing in the group Amartya, together with Anjasmara, Gunawan, and Tia Ivanka.

Lefrandt returned to acting in 2009, playing in the film Jamila dan Sang Presiden, released in April. He also became a lecturer in the law faculty at the Sam Ratulangi University, Manado. Lefrandt serves as president of President of Skylar Comics.

Lefrandt married his girlfriend, Dewi Rezer, a former video jockey of MTV Indonesia. They got married at Hotel Tirta Bali International, Uluwatu, Jimbaran, Bali on 18 July 2007. The couple have two children. They divorced in 2016. Lefrandt practices the martial art of judo.

== Filmography ==
=== Film ===
Year	Title	Role	Notes
2009	Jamila dan Sang Presiden	Malik	Supporting role
2012	Witness	Detective Indra	Supporting role
2014	Street Society	Marco	Supporting role
2019	Too Handsome to Handle	unknown	Supporting role
2022	Ashiap Man	Gersang	Supporting role

=== Television ===
Year	Title	Role	Notes	Network
1999–2000	Wajah Penuh Cinta (Face Filled with Love)		Lead role	RCTI
2000–2002	Bidadari (Angel)	Mr. Bagus	Supporting role	RCTI
2002–2003	Bidadari 2 (Angel 2)	Mr. Bagus	Supporting role	RCTI
2003–2004	Tersanjung 6	Erwin	Supporting role	Indosiar
2004–2005	Bidadari 3 (Angel 3)	Mr. Bagus	Supporting role	RCTI
2005	Tersanjung 7	Erwin	Supporting role	Indosiar
2005	Raja Jalanan	Rama	Lead role	SCTV
2009	Pengorbanan Anggun	Rudi	Supporting role	Indosiar
2010	Putri Duyung Marina (Marina the Mermaid)	Marina's father	Supporting role	Indosiar
2010–2011	Arti Sahabat	Sukmo Agung	Supporting role	Indosiar
2012–2013	Raja dan Aku (The King and I)	King Abdullah	Supporting role	Global TV
2013	Terbang Bersamamu (Fly with You)	Rustam	Supporting role	MNCTV
2013–2014	Ken Arok & Ken Dedes		Supporting role	MNCTV

=== Television film ===
Year	Title	Role	Notes
2009	Untukmu Segalanya	Firman	Lead role

=== Music videos ===
Year	Song title	Artist
1994	"Yang Hilang"	Anggun C. Sasmi
2009	"Cinta Terlarang"	The Virgin
