= AWB =

AWB may refer to:

== Organizations ==
- Afrikaner Weerstandsbeweging, a South African neo-Nazi organisation
- Angry Without Borders, a revolutionary group in Sudan
- Astronomers Without Borders, a US-based organization
- Aviation Without Borders, a humanitarian organization
- AWB Limited (formerly Australian Wheat Board), a grain marketing organization

== Other uses ==
- Aaron Wan-Bissaka (born 1997) DR Congolese professional footballer
- .awb, a filename extension for Adaptive Multi-Rate Wideband computer files
- Air waybill, an airline's receipt for goods
- Attoweber (aWb), a unit of magnetic flux
- Auto white balance in photography
- Average White Band, a Scottish band
  - AWB (album), 1974, by Average White Band
- Federal Assault Weapons Ban, a US law
