= What We Remember =

Single by Anggun

from the album 8
- Language: English
- Released: 13 October 2017
- Recorded: 2017
- Genre: Pop
- Length: 2:46
- Label: April Earth; Universal
- Songwriter(s): Anggun; Silvio Lisbonne; Guillaume Boscaro
- Producer(s): Lisbonne; Tiborg

Anggun singles chronology
"Teka-Teki" (2016)	"What We Remember" (2017)

Music video
- "What We Remember" on YouTube

"What We Remember" is a song recorded by Indonesian-French singer Anggun for her seventh international album 8 (2017). It was written by the singer alongside Silvio Lisbonne and Guillaume Boscaro. The song was released as the album's lead single on 13 October 2017 on all digital music platforms.

"What We Remember" became Anggun's first charting single in the United States since "Snow on the Sahara" in 1998. It reached number eight on the Billboard Dance Club Songs chart in the United States. The song's music video, directed by Roy Raz, also received a heavy rotation on MTV Asia.

== Track listing ==
- Digital download
1. "What We Remember" – 2:46

== Charts ==
Chart (2018)	Peak position
Asia Pop 40	15
US Dance Club Songs (Billboard)	8
