= Anggun C. Sasmi... Lah!!! =

- Indonesian CD edition artwork with embossing on the front and back covers

Studio album by Anggun C. Sasmi
- Released: 15 June 1993
- Recorded: 1993
- Studio: Gin's Studio (South Jakarta); Triple M (Bandung)
- Genre: Hard rock
- Label: Bali Cipta Records; Blackboard
- Producer: Anggun

Anggun C. Sasmi chronology
Nocturno (1992)	Anggun C. Sasmi... Lah!!! (1993)	Yang Hilang (1994)

Singles from Anggun C. Sasmi... Lah!!!
- 1. "Kembalilah Kasih (Kita Harus Bicara)" Released: 1993

Anggun C. Sasmi... Lah!!! is the fourth Indonesian-language studio album by Indonesian singer Anggun. Her first self-produced record, it was released on 15 June 1993 under her own label, Bali Cipta Records. The album yielded the successful single, "Kembalilah Kasih (Kita Harus Bicara)", and earned a nomination for "Best Selling Album of the Year" at the 1993 BASF Awards.

== Background and release ==
The album was released independently through Anggun's own record label, Bali Cipta Records. This decision to self-produce the album was a direct response to the unclear contract issues she had faced within the domestic music industry at the time. This independent endeavor was met with significant challenges, forcing her to single-handedly compete against the dominance of major record labels in Indonesia. Furthermore, her efforts were complicated by the disappointment caused by a piracy case involving the album's release.

It became Anggun's final studio album in her homeland before moving to Europe to embark on an international career.

== Promotion and accolades ==
The album's promotion centered on its lead single, "Kembalilah Kasih (Kita Harus Bicara)". The track achieved commercial success within Indonesia, aided by the release of multiple music video versions. First version, directed by actress Ria Irawan gained international exposure through rotation on MTV Hong Kong and received recognition at the Video Musik Indonesia (VMI) Awards in 1993, winning "Best Music Video" and "Favorite Music Video". Second version received airplay on the national television network TVRI on the program Musik Kita.

On July 10, 1993, Anggun staged a solo concert at the Ratu Plaza Concert Hall, Jakarta. Although the performance recorded for a planned LaserDisc release, the project ultimately never materialized.

Commercially, the album's success earned a nomination for "Best Selling Album of the Year" at the national BASF Awards that same year. It also released in Malaysia, Brunei, and Singapore through PolyGram, featuring an alternative cover design. To support its regional release, she promoted on the Malaysian television program Muzik Muzik on TV3.

"Kembalilah Kasih (Kita Harus Bicara)" was covered by the Indonesian band Gigi for their 2007 album, Peace, Love & Respect.

== Track listing ==
No.	Title	Writer(s)	Length
1.	"Kembalilah Kasih (Kita Harus Bicara)"	Thomas Ramdhan, Rustam	4:36
2.	"Kenapa Harus"	Pay, Rustam, Anggun	3:50
3.	"Sahara"	Lilo, Pay, Andi Julias	4:59
4.	"Nanti Pasti Abadi"	Grass Rock	4:17
5.	"Penyelesaian Tolol"	Pay, Rustam, Anggun	3:48
6.	"Di Kejauhan"	Grass Rock	4:51
7.	"Karenamu Kini Aku Mengerti"	Grass Rock	4:04
8.	"Matahari Hatiku"	Grass Rock	3:59
9.	"Jawara"	Pay, Lilo, Andi Julias	5:02
10.	"Sendiri"	Pay, Rustam, Anggun	5:13
Total length:			44:39

== Personnel ==
Credits adapted from album liner notes Anggun C. Sasmi... Lah!!!.

Musicians

- Anggun – lead vocals; executive producer
- Lost Boy – backing vocals (9); arrangement (3)
- Grass Rock – arrangement (4–5, 6–8)
- Lilo – arrangement (1, 9)
- Thomas Ramdhan – arrangement (1); bass (1–3, 5, 9, 10)
- Pay Burman – arrangement (2, 5, 10); guitar (1–3, 5, 9–10)
- Ronald – bass (1); drum (1–3, 5, 9–10)
- Eddy Kemput – guitar (4, 6–8)
- Donny Suhendra – guitar (2)
- Andy Ayunir – keyboard
- Mandow – keyboard (4, 6–8)
- Rere Reza – drum (4, 6–8)
- Yudhie N.H. – bass (4, 6–8)

Technical

- Harry – recording engineer
- Eddy – recording engineer
- Theo – recording engineer
- Frank Lee – mixing
- Lilo – mixing
- Andy Ayunir – mixing
- Michel de Gea – mixing
- Desmond – mix assistant
- Terence – mix assistant

Design

- Ronny – photography
- Dik Doank – cover design
