= Cyril Montana =

French writer

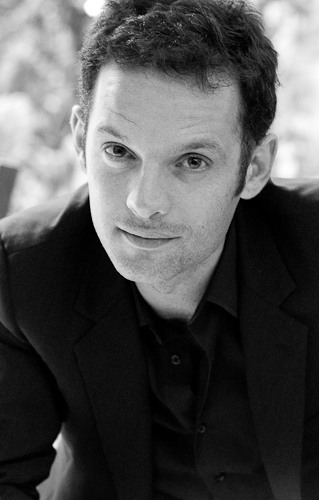
- Cyril Montana
- Born: France
- Occupation: Writer
- Spouse: Anggun (m. 2006; div. 2014)
- Children: 1

Cyril Montana is a French writer and one of Anggun's former husbands. She gave birth to their daughter named Kirana Cipta Montana, on 8 November 2007.

== Biography ==
After moving to Paris, he became a novelist, publishing three acclaimed works with Le Dilettante publishing house starting in 2005. His novel La Faute à Mick Jagger (2007) was shortlisted for the Renaudot and Marcel Pagnol prizes in 2008.

He has been a producer for France Culture and a columnist for Le Point and other magazines such as Sport and Style, Grand Seigneur, etc.

Cyril Montana co-wrote the creative documentary Cyril contre Goliath (Cyril vs. Goliath, 2020) with Thomas Bornot, produced thanks to crowdfunding in 2015. The documentary deals with Pierre Cardin real estate takeover of the village of Lacoste, where Montana grew up in part.

== Works ==
- Malabar trip, Paris, Éditions Le Dilettante, 2003, 125 p. ISBN 2-84263-077-7
- Carla on my mind, Paris, Éditions Le Dilettante, 2005, 156 p. ISBN 2-84263-102-1
- Le Bonheur de refaire le monde, Paris, Maren Sell Éditeurs, 2005, 158 p. ISBN 2-35004-031-3
- La Faute à Mick Jagger, Paris, Éditions Le Dilettante, 2007, 222 p. ISBN 978-2-84263-147-5
- Je nous trouve beaux, Paris, Albin Michel, coll. " Littérature générale ", 2013, 200 p. ISBN 978-2-226-24524-3
Gallery
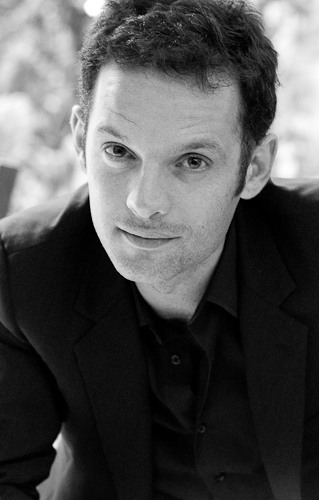
Cyril Montana (2014).

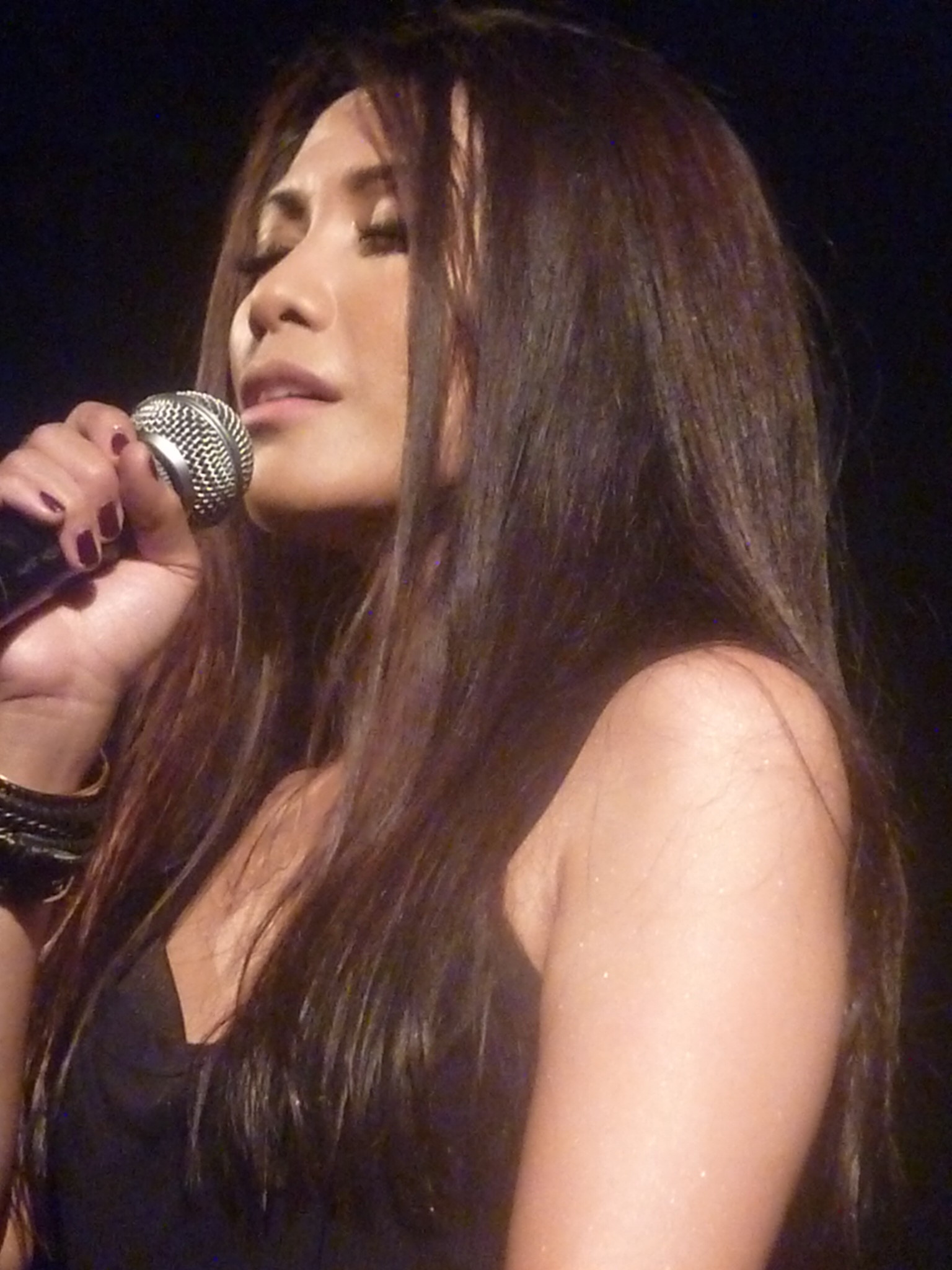
Cyril Montana's wife.
