= Cristina Córdula =

Brazilian-French model, fashion consultant, presenter and TV host

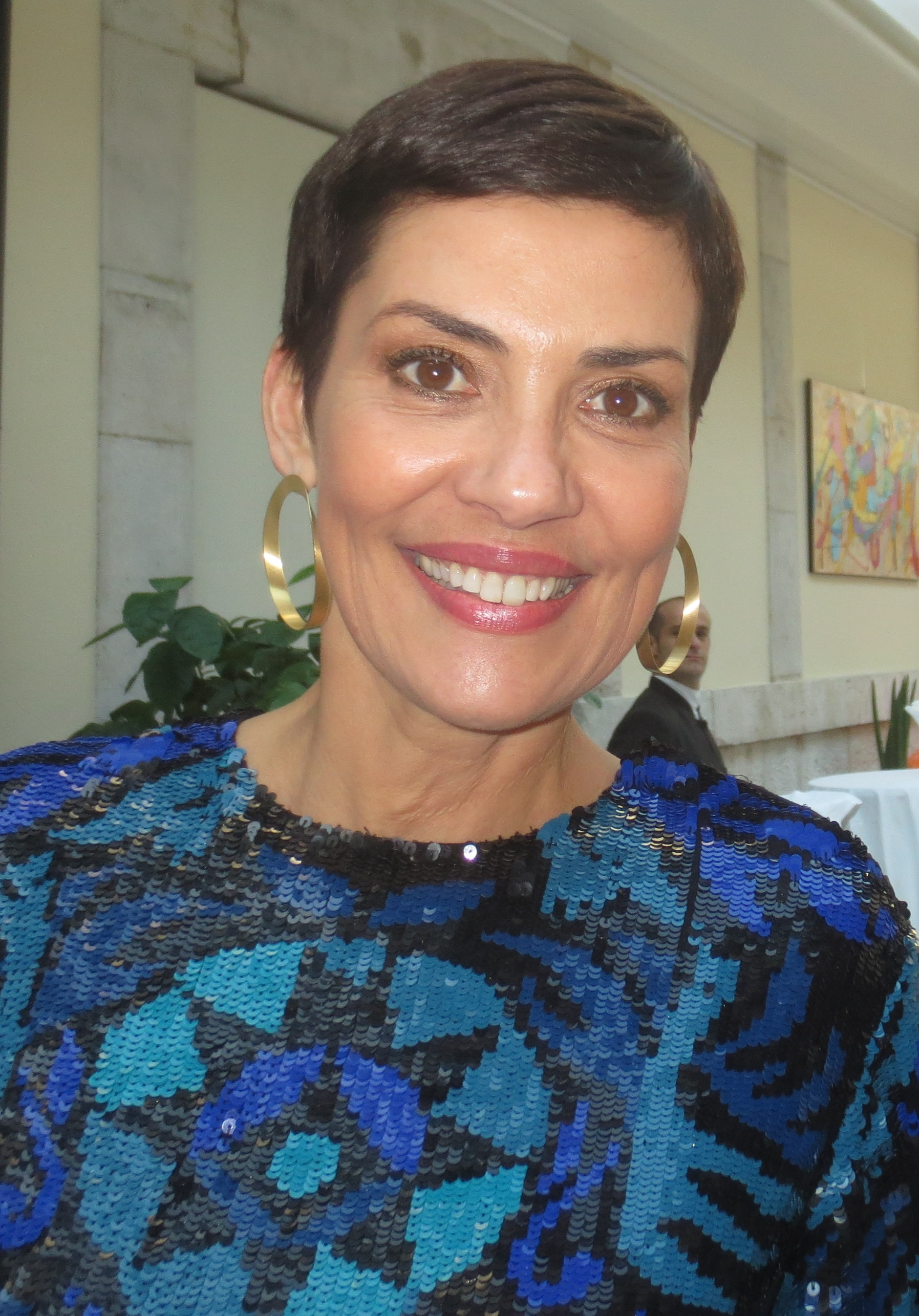
- Born: Maria Cristina Córdula da Cunha; 30 October 1962 (age 63); Rio de Janeiro, Brazil
- Education: Universidade Gama Filho
- Occupations: Television presenter; fashion consultant; model
- Employer: M6
- Spouse: Frédéric Cassin (m. 2017)

Maria Cristina Córdula da Cunha (Brazilian Portuguese: [maˈɾi.ɐ kɾisˈtʃinɐ ˈkɔʁdulɐ da ˈkũɲɐ]; born 30 October 1964) is a Brazilian-French television presenter, fashion consultant, and former fashion model. Born in Brazil, she is a naturalized citizen of France.

Settled in France, she presents several restyling programmes on M6 and Téva like Les Reines du shopping, Cousu main and Nouveau look pour une nouvelle vie.

== Early life and education ==
Her father was a company director and her mother was a sociologist and later became an art critic. One of her uncles was a painter. She studied journalism and communication at the Brazilian university Gama Filho.

== Modeling career ==
Cristina Córdula appeared in advertisements before she began to parade at the age of 16 in Brazil and to pose for fashion magazines. During a fashion show in Milan, a friend hairstylist in São Paulo recommended her to cut her hair. With her new haircut, her international modeling career took off, being represented by mannequin agencies such as Delphine, Zen and Neo for famous houses like Yves Saint Laurent, Chanel or Dior. She arrived in Europe in 1985, after having been spotted by a Spanish agency. She agreed to parade the last time for the famous French couturier Marc Bohan.

== Fashion consultant, television and radio presenter ==
In 2002, Córdula opened her fashion consultancy Cristina Cordula - Agence de Relooking in Paris where she now lives.

In parallel with her fashion consultant's activity, she was contacted by M6 and would be coach with Emilie Albertini in the programme Nouveau look pour une nouvelle vie, broadcast in a second time slot and presented by Véronique Mounier. From 2008 to 2011, she worked in tandem with Emilie Albertini, presenting of the programme and the relooking, then alone since 2012.

Since June 2013, she has hosted, on M6, from Monday to Friday, Les Reines du shopping at 17:25, and its male variation Les Rois du shopping since June 2015.

Since June 2017, she has been hosting the programme La Robe de ma vie, broadcast from Monday to Friday at 16:20 then on Monday in a second time slot, in which future brides choose their wedding dress.

Since 7 January 2019, M6 had been broadcasting Les Reines des enchères at 17:35. The programme, based on the model of Les Reines du shopping, first caused controversy because of its presumed resemblance with Affaire conclue by Sophie Davant on France 2. After 5 days on air, M6 cancelled the programme on account of weak audience and broadcast new episodes of Les Reines du shopping.

== Personal life ==
Cristina Córdula has a son, Enzo, born in 1994.

On 6 June 2017, she got married in Capri, with Frédéric Cassin, a French businessman.

On 18 December 2018, she obtained French nationality.
