= Nos vies parallèles =

Single by Anggun and Florent Pagny

from the album Toujours un ailleurs
- Released: 15 September 2015
- Recorded: 2015
- Genre: Pop
- Length: 3:29
- Label: TF1 Musique
- Songwriter(s): Thierry Surgeon, Frédéric Chateau
- Producer(s): Frédéric Chateau

Anggun singles chronology
"À nos enfants" (2015)	"Nos vies parallèles" (2015)	"Face au vent" (2016)

Florent Pagny singles chronology
"Le soldat" (2014)	"Nos vies parallèles" (2015)	"La vie ne m'apprend rien" (2016)

"Nos vies parallèles" (French pronunciation: [no vi paʁalɛl]) is a song recorded by French-Indonesian singer Anggun and French singer Florent Pagny. The song was written by Thierry Surgeon and Frédéric Chateau for Anggun's sixth French-language album Toujours un ailleurs (2015). It was released as the album's second single by TF1 Musique on 15 September 2015. The music video for the song was directed by Igreco from HiFive Production and took location in Cuba.

== Track listing and formats ==
- Digital download
1. "Nos vies parallèles" – 3:29

== Charts ==
Chart (2015–16)	Peak position
Belgium (Ultratop 50 Wallonia)	39
France (SNEP)	47
French International Airplay (Francodiff)	3
French International Download (Francodiff)	3
