= 8 (Anggun album) =

Studio album by Anggun
- Released: 8 December 2017
- Recorded: 2016–17
- Genre: Pop
- Length: 33:33
- Language: English
- Labels: April Earth, Universal Music

Anggun chronology
Toujours un ailleurs (2015)	8 (2017)

Singles from 8
- 1. "What We Remember" Released: 13 October 2017; 2. "The Good Is Back" Released: 20 April 2018

8 is the seventh international studio album by Indonesian-French singer Anggun and her eleventh overall. It was released by Universal Music on 8 December 2017 and became her first English-language album not to have a standalone French version. The album's first single, "What We Remember", was released digitally on 13 October 2017 and reached number eight on the Billboard Dance Club Songs chart in the United States.

== Background ==
Following the release of her sixth French-language album, Toujours un ailleurs (2015), Anggun worked on the English version. In July 2017, it was announced that the singer had signed a pan-Asian recording deal with Universal Music Asia, based in Hong Kong, and her album would be released by the end of the year. She then restarted the album's recording and rejected all the English songs from the Toujours un ailleurs session, including the ones she recorded with Brian Rawling in Metrophonic Studio, London.

Titled 8, the album became Anggun's eighth album since her international breakthrough, following Snow on the Sahara / Au nom de la lune (1997), Chrysalis / Désirs contraires (2000), the Open Hearts soundtrack (2002), Luminescence (2005), Elevation (2008), Echoes / Échos (2011), and Toujours un ailleurs (2015).

== Promotion ==
The album was launched at the Apple Store on Orchard Road in Singapore on 8 December 2017, with an acoustic showcase by the singer. Anggun also travelled to Manila, Philippines to do a promotional tour. "What We Remember" was released as the album's first single on 13 October 2017, with a music video directed by Roy Raz. The second single, "The Good Is Back", was released in two duet versions on 20 April 2018, one with Indonesian singer Rossa and the other with Malaysian singer Fazura.

== Track listing ==
No.	Title	Writer(s)	Producer(s)	Length
1.	"No Promises"	Anggun; Julian Grenier; Romain Joutard		3:28
2.	"What We Remember"	Anggun; Silvio Lisbonne; Guillaume Boscaro	Lisbonne; Tiborg	2:46
3.	"The Good Is Back"	Anggun; Manon Romiti; Jeremy Poligné	Poligné; Tiborg	3:45
4.	"Righteous"	Anggun; Eddy Pradelles; Thomas Caruso	Pradelles; Tiborg	3:34
5.	"Alive"	Anggun; Laurent Wilthien; Matthieu Tosi; Jean-Noël Wilthien	Skydancers	3:25
6.	"Medicine and Meditation"	Nazim Khaled; Manon Romiti; Lisbonne	Lisbonne; Tiborg	3:27
7.	"Inhuman"	Anggun; Nicolas Loconte	Loconte	3:10
8.	"Forget Her"	Anggun; Loconte	Loconte	3:08
9.	"Oceans"	Anggun; Christian Kretschmar	Kretschmar	3:55
10.	"Thank You"	Anggun; Grenier; Joutard		3:05

== Charts ==
List of singles and chart positions
Title	US Dance
"What We Remember"	8
"The Good Is Back"	20

== Release history ==
Region	Date	Label	Edition(s)	Format(s)
Indonesia	8 December 2017	Universal Music	Standard edition	CD
Malaysia	8 December 2017	Universal Music	Standard edition	CD
Philippines	8 December 2017	Universal Music	Standard edition	CD
Taiwan	8 December 2017	Universal Music	Standard edition	CD
Various	8 December 2017	Universal Music	Standard edition	Digital download, music streaming
