= Dewi Rezer =

Indonesian actress, presenter and model (born 1980)

- Born: Francesca Gabrielle Dewi Rezer; 29 September 1980 (age 45); Jakarta, Indonesia
- Occupations: Actress; model; presenter
- Years active: 1995–present
- Spouse: Ethan Kalmar (m. 2023)
- Children: 2
- Parent(s): Nurdiati; Yotin Rezer
- Website: http://www.dulcedelece.com/ https://twitter.com/Rezerdewi

Dewi Rezer (born 29 September 1980) is an Indonesian actress, presenter and model.

== Biography ==
Dewi Rezer is the eldest of four children born to Nurdiati and Yotin Rezer. Reze is of Indonesian and French ancestry. Her mother is Betawi and her father French.

Her career began in 1995, when she became a model for the Indonesian magazine Gadis Sampul. Rezer appeared in fashion shows from her teenage years until the early 2000s. Rezer then became an actress. She made her first appearance in film in 2003 in the comedy Rumah Ketujuh, alongside actor Indra Birowo.

Dewi Rezer married actor Marcellino Lefrandt in Bali on 18 July 2007. She gave birth to their daughter, Marcelle Renee Brinette Lefrandt, on 21 December 2007. She gave birth to a son, Leopold Lefrandt Jarvis, on 11 October 2012. The couple divorced in 2016.

Dewi married Ethan Kalmar in 2023 in Canada, where Dewi and Ethan both have family. The couple met in Bali, and dated for 6 years before getting married. They live together with Ethan's daughter, Maya Kalmar and Dewi's children Jarvis and Brinette.

== Filmography ==
=== Feature films ===
- Rumah Ketujuh (Seventh House; 2003)
- Buruan Cium Gue (Kiss me; 2004)
- Potong Bebek Angsa (Cut the duck goose; 2012)
- Geez and Ann (2021)
- Pontien (Pontianak Untold Story) (Pontien (Pontianak untold story); Filming)

=== Television appearances ===
- Satu Lagi Persembahan untuk Pecinta (One more offerings for lovers; 2004)
- Ciuman ABG (ABG of the Kiss; 2007)
- Ramalan Alisa (Alisa forecast; 2011)
- 4 Diva (4 Diva; 2013)
- Mengejar Jodoh (Pursuing; 2013)
- Wakuncar (Wakuncar; 2014)
- Belenggu Dua Hati (Shackle of two heart; 2020)
