= Les Reines du shopping =

French reality television show

Les Reines du Shopping ("The Queens of Shopping") is a French reality television show, broadcast on M6 since 10 June 2013 until 31 October 2022 and hosted by Cristina Córdula.

== Broadcasting ==
The show is broadcast Monday to Friday at the end of the evening on M6. In Belgium, it is broadcast on the private channel RTL TVI.

It has so far run four seasons. The first of these was broadcast in June 2013 and the high audience ratings led to the second season being broadcast from October 2013 to June 2014.

The show ended on 31 October 2022.

This TV show is an adaptation of the Turkish series Bana Her Şey Yakışır which has been broadcast in Turkey since 2011.

The narrator is the French announcer Hervé Lacroix.

Shopping Star is the Greek version of the show that premiered on 21 November 2016 on Star Channel and have been aired until now seven seasons. The fourth series began airing on 16 September 2019. The Greek show was hosted by model Vicky Kaya, from the first season until season seven. On July 20, 2023, it was revealed that the new presenter of the show since the eighth season will be Iliana Papageorgiou. The eighth season began airing on 25 September 2023.

== Review ==
The newspaper Libération thinks that this show imposes a "standardized image of femininity" in which a woman dresses firstly to appeal to men, pointing particularly to the title of the season 3 show "Dinner at the restaurant with your boss and his wife" and the implied idea that it is the man who has the power.
