= Anak Putih Abu Abu =

- 2015 CD Reissue artwork

Studio album by Anggun C. Sasmi
- Released: 1991
- Recorded: 1991
- Genre: Rock
- Label: Harpa Records
- Producer: Handoko Kusuma

Anggun C. Sasmi chronology
Dunia Aku Punya (1986)	Anak Putih Abu Abu (1991)	Nocturno (1992)

Singles from Nocturno
- 1. "Nafas Cinta" Released: 1991; 2. "Anak Putih Abu Abu" Released: 1991

Anak Putih Abu Abu (meaning High School Kids) is the second Indonesian-language studio album by Indonesian singer Anggun. The album was released in 1991, by Harpa Records.

== Background ==
Following the release of a series of commercially successful singles, including "Mimpi," "Tua-Tua Keladi," and "Takut," and contributing to the Si Roy soundtrack between 1989 and 1990, Anggun released her second studio album after Dunia Aku Punya.

The album was notably subtitled "100% Baru" (100% New) on original cassette sleeve as a protest against the producers who unauthorizedly re-issued and compiled her earlier material, including the 1990 release of the album Kepada Alam dan Pencintanya by Musica, which featured recordings from 1983.

== Promotion and release ==
The album was supported by two singles: "Nafas Cinta" and "Anak Putih Abu Abu". The music video for the lead single "Nafas Cinta" was directed by DJ Nawi and features a cameo appearance by Pay Burman. It was filmed at Sari Restaurant, Kuningan and Hasta Hotel, Senayan. The video received airplay on the national television network TVRI on the program Selekta Pop.

Commercially, the album's success led to Anggun being named the "Best Newcomer Female Singer (1990–1991)" by Popular Magazine. At the Popular Magazine Awards held on May 10, 1991, she performed a cover of Sinéad O'Connor's "Nothing Compares 2 U" and also nominated for "Best Female Singer", but losing to Nicky Astria.

Anak Putih Abu Abu was officially re-issued in 2015 by Bravo Musik. This edition was made available on CD and digital download platforms and featured four bonus tracks, including the hit singles "Takut" (1990) and "Gaya Remaja" (1991), as well as a duet version of "Batu-Batu" with Nike Ardilla.

== Track listing ==
Anak Putih Abu Abu – Standard edition
No.	Title	Writer(s)	Length
1.	"Anak Putih Abu Abu"	Teddy Sudjaja; Tontowi	4:38
2.	"Nafas Cinta"	Sudjaja; Pamungkas NM	6:05
3.	"Pesta Kita"	Sudjaja; Tontowi	4:30
4.	"Harimau"	Sudjaja; Tontowi	4:31
5.	"Stop"	Rudy Gagola	4:14
6.	"Bilakah Damai"	Gagola; Tontowi	4:18
7.	"Jerit"	Sudjaja; Tontowi	4:29
8.	"Nafas Cinta" (karaoke)	Sudjaja; Pamungkas NM	5:45
9.	"Yang Patut Untuk Kita Rasa"	Sudjaja; Pamungkas NM	4:37
Total length:			43:07

Anak Putih Abu Abu – 2015 reissue edition (bonus tracks)
No.	Title	Writer(s)	Length
10.	"Gaya Remaja"	Sudjaja; Mauli G.; Narashima	4:15
11.	"Takut"	Mus Mujiono; Deddy Dhukun	5:35
12.	"Angkuh"	Titiek Bartje Van Houten	4:57
13.	"Batu-Batu" (with Nike Ardilla)	Rudy R.	4:36
Total length:			62:30

== Personnel ==
Credits adapted from album liner notes Anak Putih Abu Abu.

Musicians

- Anggun – lead vocals
- Handoko Kusuma – producer
- Teddy Sudjaja – drum; percusiion
- Pay Burman – guitar (1–2, 4–5, 7–8)
- Eet Sjahranie – guitar (6)
- Gideon Tengker – guitar (3)
- Andy Ayunir – keyboard
- Rudi Gagola – bass

Technical

- Danny Lisapali – sound engineer; mixing
- Teddy Sudjaja – mixing
