= Pierre Sang Boyer =

French chef

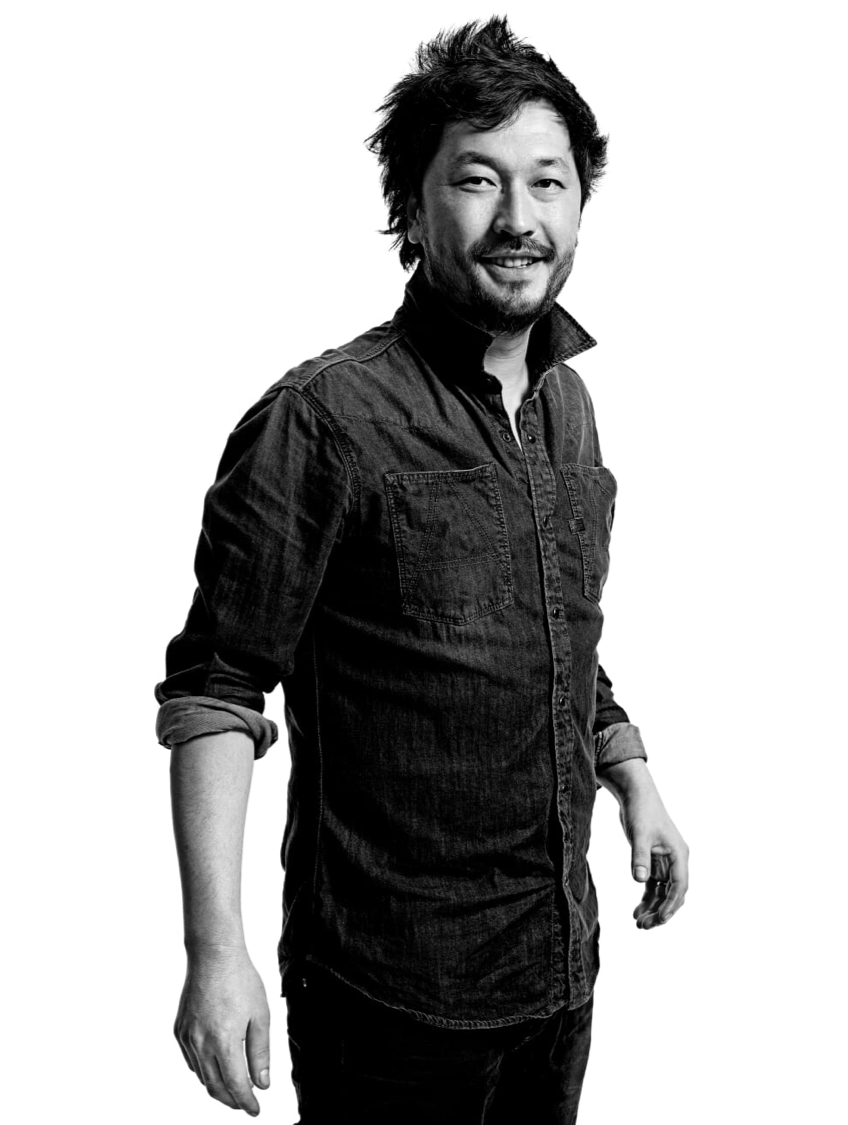
- Born: Seoul, South Korea
- Culinary career
- Current restaurant(s): Pierre Sang in Oberkampf (Paris) Pierre Sang on Gambey (Paris) Pierre Sang Signature (Paris)
- Television show: Top Chef (France)

Pierre Sang Boyer is a South-Korean born French chef. In 2011, he was a finalist at the French version of Top Chef.

== Early life and education ==
Born in Seoul, Pierre Sang Boyer was adopted at the age of seven by a French couple and grew up in Lantriac in the department of Haute-Loire.

== Career ==
Pierre Sang Boyer participated in 2011 at the second season of the French version of Top Chef and ended finalist. He opened his own restaurant in the 11th arrondissement of Paris in the popular quarter of Oberkampf, a neo-bistrot named Pierre Sang in Oberkamp. With two Korean chefs, he proposes a market cuisine with Asian products.

=== Pierre Sang in Oberkampf ===
It is the first restaurant to have opened in 2012, after the participation of Pierre Sang in Top Chef in 2011. It advocates local food using season products and attaches a lot of importance to their origins.

=== Pierre Sang on Gambey ===
It is the second restaurant that opened in 2014, and is located rue Gambey, at a few metres of the first one. This restaurant is of a higher range.

== Bibliography ==
- Pierre Sang (2012). D'ici et d'ailleurs (in French). Neuilly-sur-Seine: M6 édition. ISBN 978-2-35985-087-1.
- Pierre Sang (2015). Best of Pierre Sang Boyer (in French). Paris: Alain Ducasse édition. ISBN 978-2-84123-791-3.
- Frédéric Anton; Pierre Sang (2016). Secrets de cuisiniers - 135 cours en pas à pas (in French). Les Editions Culinaires. ISBN 978-2-84123-866-8.
