= Dunia Aku Punya =

- The original 1986 artwork variants.

Studio album by Anggun C. Sasmi
- Released: 1986
- Recorded: 1986
- Genre: Rock
- Label: Billboard Indonesia
- Producer: Ian Antono

Anggun C. Sasmi chronology
Dunia Aku Punya (1986)	Anak Putih Abu Abu (1991)

Dunia Aku Punya (meaning The World Is Mine) is the debut studio album by Indonesian singer-songwriter Anggun. It was released by Billboard Indonesia in 1986 and produced by Indonesian rock musician Ian Antono.

== Background ==
Anggun began singing at a young age, coached by her father, a writer, who trained her using vocal guidebooks. Unlike the prevailing trend of Indonesian pop, her musical influences were rooted in rock and roll, having been exposed to groups like The Beatles and The Rolling Stones. She gained attention by performing The Beatles' songs at recreational areas like Ancol, which led to her being noticed by a producer.

Her first album was recorded at the age of nine through Musica Studios, Kepada Alam & Pencintanya, features cover versions of ballads by Indonesian country singer Ritta Rubby Hartland. However, Anggun was disappointed at the time because her producer did not publish the album. After Anggun reached the recognition in the early 1990s, the children's album was later released without her authorization.

As she grew older, Anggun started writing her own material and sought to become a rock singer, leading her to collaborate with legendary rock producer Ian Antono.

== Production and release ==
Dunia Aku Punya was released by Billboard Indonesia in 1986. It is credited as Anggun's official debut album on its cover sleeve. The album was composed by Ian Antono, Areng Widodo, Appin Astrid, Yessy Robot, Andy Nasution, Amin Ivo's, Ariyanto, Ade Ibat, Ully Sigar Rusady, and Darto Singo (Anggun's father). Anggun also wrote two songs on the album, "Tegang" and "Tik Tak Tik Tuk".

The songs on this album has a variety, with some songs telling about national spirit ("Garudaku"), peace ("Perdamaian") and about woman ("Dari Seorang Wanita"). The album spawned two promotional singles, "Tegang", which the music video being aired on the national television network, TVRI and "Dunia Aku Punya".

The album did not perform well commercially, and Anggun later reached the success with her 1989 hit "Mimpi". In 1990, after Anggun peaked her popularity in Indonesia, the album was re-released with the title Tegang, with the same track listing but different cover artwork.

== Track listing ==
No.	Title	Writer(s)	Length
1.	"Tegang"	Anggun C. Sasmi; Darto Singo
2.	"Sibuk"	Appin Astrid
3.	"Dunia Aku Punya"	Yessy Robot
4.	"Masa Remaja"	Andy Nasution
5.	"Tik Tak Tik Tuk"	Sasmi
6.	"Perdamaian"	Amin Ivo's
7.	"Tante Cerewet"	A. Riyanto
8.	"Kawan Lama"	Ade Ibat
9.	"Dari Seorang Wanita"	Ully Sigar Rusady
10.	"Ganti-Gantian"	Areng Widodo
11.	"Gadis Penari"	Yoes Yono
12.	"Garudaku"	Ian Antono; Widodo

== Personnel ==
Credits adapted from album liner notes Dunia Aku Punya.

- Ian Antono – producer; arranger
- Anggun – lead vocals
- Tonny A. – cover design
