= Tony Ward (designer) =

Lebanese fashion designer (born 1970)

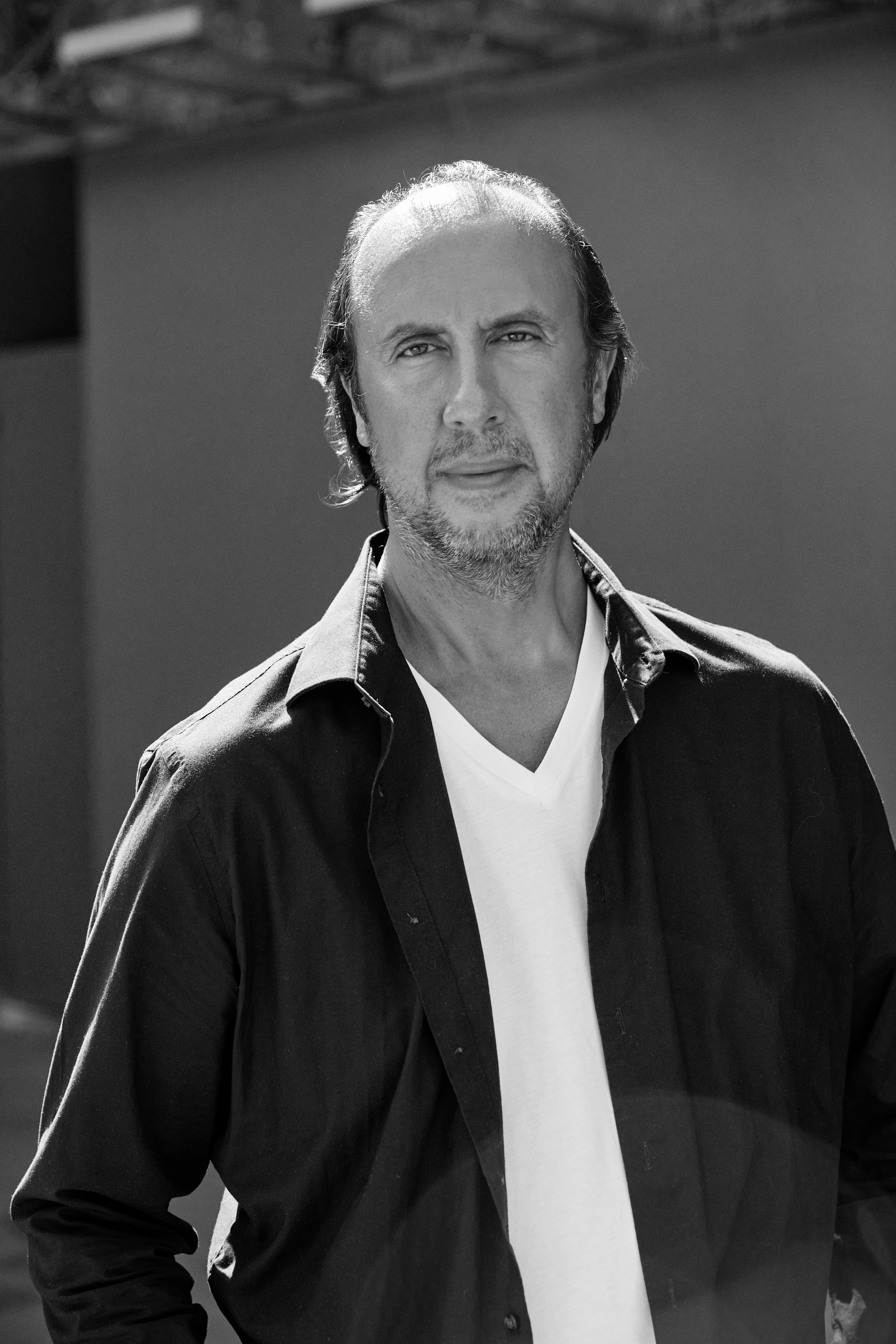
- Ward in 2022
- Born: 27 March 1970 (age 56); Beirut, Lebanon
- Education: Fédération de la Haute Couture et de la Mode, Paris
- Occupation: Fashion Designer
- Organization: Tony Ward Couture
- Father: Elie Ward
- Website: http://www.tonyward.net/

Tony Ward (born 27 March 1970) is a Lebanese fashion designer. Named “The Architect of Detail”, he draws his inspiration from contemporary architecture.

== Early life ==
Ward was born in Beirut. He is the son of Elie Ward, a couturier. At 18, Ward enrolled in the Ecole de la Chambre Syndicale de la Couture Parisienne in Paris, France. He worked with Claude Montana at Lanvin, with Gianfranco Ferré at Dior, and then with Karl Lagerfeld at Chloé, where he studied haute couture before he launched his own brand Tony Ward Couture.

== Career ==
After working in Paris, Ward came back to his home country and launched his own couture line in 1997, for which he was awarded 1st prize at the "Société des Artistes et Décorateurs" (SAD) design competition.

In 2013, his collection "Frozen Memories" was presented in Moscow at The Mercedes-Benz Fashion Week. The runway used competitors from the Miss Universe 2013 pageant who walked down the runway wearing Tony Ward Couture creations. After ten years of presenting his collections in Rome during Italian Fashion Week, in 2014, Tony Ward started presenting his collections in Paris.

== Headquarters ==
After celebrating the 60th birthday of the historical Ward Atelier, Ward Couture moved its new headquarters to Hôtel-Dieu Avenue in Beirut, Lebanon.

== Museum displays ==
A gown worn by Whitney Houston for The BET Honors in 2010 was part of a temporary exhibit at the Grammy Museum.

A dress worn by Pink at the Grammy Awards was displayed at the Limited/Unlimited exhibition for the AltaRomAltaModa fashion event 2010 in Rome, Italy.
