= Toujours un ailleurs =

Studio album by Anggun
- Released: 20 November 2015
- Recorded: 2014–15
- Genre: Pop; world
- Length: 54:04
- Language: French
- Label: April Earth, TF1 Musique
- Producer: Frederic Chateau; Brian Rawling

Anggun chronology
Best-Of: Design of a Decade 2003–2013 (2013)	Toujours un ailleurs (2015)	8 (2017)

Singles from Toujours un ailleurs
- 1. "À nos enfants" Released: 20 Juni 2015; 2. "Nos vies parallèles" Released: 15 September 2015; 3. "Face au vent" Released: 23 February 2016

Toujours un ailleurs (meaning Always Elsewhere) is the sixth international studio album by Anggun. It was released physically in France and Belgium by TF1 Musique on 20 November 2015, and as a digital album worldwide. It became her first French-language album not to have its standalone English-language version. The album revisited the world music direction of her debut international album, Snow on the Sahara (1997). Toujours un ailleurs was produced by Frédéric Chateau and Brian Rawling, and features guest vocals by singers Florent Pagny, Yuri Buenaventura, and Angélique Kidjo.

Three singles—"À nos enfants", "Nos vies parallèles" (duet with Florent Pagny and featuring Yuri Buenaventura) and "Face au vent"—were released to promote the album. "Nos vies parallèles" became Anggun's longest-running single on the official SNEP Singles Chart, spending 27 weeks there with a peak position of number 47. It also became her first top 40 hit on the main Belgian Ultratop Singles Chart since 2005 single "Être une femme", peaking at number 39. In 2019, the remix version of "Perfect World" peaked at number 5 on the Billboard Hot Dance Club Song.

== Background and development ==
Following the release of her fifth international studio album Echoes and her participation in the Eurovision Song Contest 2012, Anggun ventured into television by joining judging panel of several talent shows in Asia. She started writing songs for her next album after completing the first season of X Factor Indonesia (2013). On 14 February 2014 through her official Twitter account, Anggun posted a photo of her recording session in Metrophonic Studios, London, England, with Paul Barry, Patrick Mascall and James Jeffery. On her YouTube channel, Anggun later uploaded a 20-second snippet of the song "Perfect World" produced by Brian Rawling at Metrophonic Studios. Rawling is a Grammy Award-winning British producer who had produced albums of popular artists such as Cher, Tina Turner, Enrique Iglesias and One Direction. On 25 April 2014, Anggun posted a photo of her studio session with Deep Forest, who previously collaborated with her on "Deep Blue Sea" (2002).

While appearing on the TV show Les Années Bonheur, Anggun performed a cover version of Maxime Le Forestier's "Née quelque part", which would be included on her upcoming album. She announced that the album would be released circa March or April 2015. However, due to her involvement on Asia's Got Talent, the project was postponed to October 2015 and later to November 2015. In June 2015, Anggun told The Jakarta Post that she had already finished the French album with 12 tracks and in process to complete the English album by remaking six songs. Anggun announced that the French album is titled Toujours un ailleurs. The album was distributed by TF1 Musique under Universal Music Group. The yet-untitled English version will be released by the end of 2016.

== Tour ==
Anggun embarked on a concert tour to promote the album in 26 cities across France and Belgium.

Tour dates
Date	City	Country	Venue
Europe
4 June 2016	Nevers	France	12h de Nevers Magny Cours
18 June 2016	Roanne	France	Fête de la Musique
26 June 2016	Fresnes	France	Parc André Villette
2 July 2016	Vouillé	France	Festival Les Heures Vagabondes
21 July 2016	Mouscron	Belgium	Parc de Mouscron
30 July 2016	Pont-à-Mousson	France	Les Estivales
11 August 2016	Gujan-Mestras	France	Gujan Maestras
15 August 2016	Boulogne-sur-Mer	France	Quai Thurot
19 August 2016	Fleury	France	Saint Pierre la Mer
27 August 2016	Avoine, Indre-et-Loire	France	Stade
4 September 2016	Barbezieux-Saint-Hilaire	France	Foire exposition
28 September 2016	Soultzmatt	France	Le Paradis des Sources
29 September 2016	Schiltigheim	France	Salles des fêtes
1 October 2016	Romans-sur-Isère	France	Foire du Dauphiné
7 October 2016	Saint-Germain-en-Laye	France	L'Estival
9 October 2016	Bruay-la-Buissière	France	Espace Culturel Grossemy
21 October 2016	Le Puy-en-Velay	France	Théâtre du Puy-en-Velay
18 November 2016	Sedan	France	Salle Marcillet
19 November 2016	Saint-Herblain	France	La Carrière
1 December 2016	Paris	France	Café de la Danse
2 December 2016	Paris	France	Café de la Danse
3 December 2016	Paris	France	Café de la Danse
4 December 2016	Saint-Marcel	France	Espace culturel Guy Gambu
Asia
31 December 2016	Nusa Dua	Indonesia	Sofitel Bali
Europe
3 February 2017	Drancy	France	Espace Culturel du Parc
24 February 2017	Harnes	France	Salle
1 April 2017	Lille	France	Casino Barrière
14 April 2017	Cagnes-sur-Mer	France	Casino Tranchant
16 June 2017	Sète	France	Casino Tranchant

== Reception ==
According to the Syndicat National de l'Édition Phonographique (SNEP), Toujours un ailleurs was the 33rd best-selling digital album and the 38th best-selling physical album in France during its opening week. It debuted at number 43 on the combined French Albums Chart and remained on the chart for 24 weeks. It was certified gold by the SNEP for 50,000 copies shipped, becoming Anggun's most successful album in France since Luminescence (2005). Toujours un ailleurs also became her best-charting album in Belgium, charting for a total of 31 weeks with a peak of number 43. Outside of French-speaking countries, Toujours un ailleurs was only available via iTunes Store and made onto the iTunes Albums charts in Indonesia (top 10), Portugal (top 20), Mauritius, Singapore and Sri Lanka.

== Track listing ==
No.	Title	Writer(s)	Length
1.	"À nos enfants"	Frédéric Chateau	3:36
2.	"Nos vies parallèles" (with Florent Pagny, Yuri Buenaventura)	Thierry Surgeon; Chateau	3:29
3.	"Face au vent"	Iza Loris; Chateau	3:41
4.	"Perfect World"	Anggun; Paul Barry; Patrick Mascall; James Jeffrey	3:40
5.	"À quelques pas de nous"	Rémi Lacroix; Isabelle Bernal	3:20
6.	"Mon capitaine"	Loris; Surgeon; Chateau	3:37
7.	"Toujours un ailleurs"	Chateau; David Foenkinos	4:08
8.	"Née quelque part" (with Angélique Kidjo)	Maxime Le Forestier; Jean-Pierre Sabar	3:40
9.	"La Promesse"	Chateau	4:06
10.	"Est-ce que tu viendras?"	Delphine Dobrinine; Surgeon; Xavier Requena	3:59
11.	"Il suffit"	Anggun; Barry, Isabelle Bernal; Mascall; Jeffery	4:40
12.	"Aucune différence"	Anggun; Surgeon	3:46
13.	"Un jour à la fois"	Anggun; Barry; Surgeon; Requena; Mascall; Jeffery	4:35
14.	"Perfect World" (French acoustic version)	Anggun; Barry; Mascall; Jeffrey	3:47
Total length:			54:04

== Charts ==
=== Weekly charts ===
Chart (2015)	Peak position
Belgian Albums (Ultratop Wallonia)	43
French Albums (SNEP)	43
French Digital Albums (SNEP)	33
French Physical Albums (SNEP)	38

=== Year-end charts ===
Chart (2015)	Position
French Albums Chart	59
Chart (2016)	Position
Belgian Albums (Ultratop Wallonia)	188

== Certifications ==
Country	Certifications
France (SNEP)	Gold

== Release history ==
Region	Date	Label	Edition(s)	Format(s)
Belgium	20 November 2015	TF1 Musique	Standard edition	CD
France	20 November 2015	TF1 Musique	Standard edition	CD
Worldwide	20 November 2015	TF1 Musique	Standard edition	Digital download
