= Nocturno (Anggun album) =

- 2015 CD Reissue artwork

Studio album by Anggun C. Sasmi
- Released: 1992
- Recorded: 1992
- Studios: Gin's Studio (South Jakarta); Triple M (Bandung)
- Genres: Hard rock, Pop metal
- Label: Harpa Records
- Producers: Handoko Kusuma; Yudie N.H.

Anggun C. Sasmi chronology
Anak Putih Abu Abu (1991)	Nocturno (1992)	Anggun C. Sasmi... Lah!!! (1993)

Singles from Nocturno
- 1. "Problema Cinta" Released: 1992; 2. "Sentuhan Dewata" Released: 1992

Nocturno is the third Indonesian-language studio album by Anggun. The album was released in 1992 under label Harpa Records.

== Promotion and release ==
The album produced several popular singles, including "Problema Cinta" and "Sentuhan Dewata." The music video for "Problema Cinta" being aired on the national television network, TVRI.

Additionally, the album's liner notes indicated that Anggun had planned a series of multi-city shows to promote Nocturno.

The album was officially re-issued in 2015 by Bravo Musik. This edition featured three additional tracks, including the 1990 single "Laba-Laba".

== Track listing ==
Nocturno – Standard edition
No.	Title	Writer(s)	Length
1.	"Problema Cinta"	Kecuk CH Dawung; Yudhie NH	4:44
2.	"Ku Tak Ingin"	Teddy Sudjaja; Pamungkas NM	5:01
3.	"Nocturno"	Pay Slank; Rustam	4:23
4.	"Sentuhan Dewata"	Hans MB; Yudhie NH	4:51
5.	"Ironi"	Yockie Suryoprayogo	5:06
6.	"Ganti Saja"	Slank; Rustam	3:54
7.	"Biar"	Slank; Rustam	5:03
8.	"Perisai Kehidupan"	Suryoprayogo	4:52
9.	"Malioboro"	Dawung; Yudhie NH	4:15
Total length:			42:49

Nocturno – 2015 reissue edition (bonus tracks)
No.	Title	Writer(s)	Length
10.	"Ku Cari Bayangmu"	Jockie Suryoprayogo	4:30
11.	"Laba-Laba"	Oetje F. Tekol	3:54
12.	"Sendiri"	May Mus	4:04
Total length:			55:17

Notes

- Based on the tagline displayed in the music video aired by TVRI, the track "Sendiri" was originally titled "Biar Daku Sendiri".

== Personnel ==
Credits adapted from album liner notes Nocturno.

Musicians

- Anggun – lead vocals
- Handoko Kusuma – producer
- Yudie N.H. – producer
- Teddy Sudjaja – arranger; drum; percusiion
- Totok Tewel – guitar
- Pay Burman – guitar
- Rere Reza – drum
- Thomas Ramdhan – bass
- Jockie Soerjoprajogo – musicians
- Andy Ayunir – keyboard
- Rudi Gagola – bass
- Roy – musicians
- Kecuk – musicians

Technical

- Rudra – recording engineer
- Denny – recording engineer

Design

- Pinky Mirror – photography
- Denny M.R. – cover design
