= International Year of Microcredit =

International Year

International Year of Microcredit is a special event of the United Nations which took place in the year 2005. The event highlighted microfinance as an instrument for socioeconomic development.

The event was launched on November 18, 2004.

== Goals ==
The United Nations Economic and Social Council proclaimed the year 2005 as the International Year of Microcredit to call for building inclusive financial sectors and strengthening the powerful, but often untapped, entrepreneurial spirit existing in communities around the world.

There are five goals associated with "The Year" which are:

1. Assess and promote the contribution of microfinance and microcredit to the MDGs;
2. Increase public awareness and understanding of microfinance and microcredit as vital parts of the development equation;
3. Promote inclusive financial sectors;
4. Support sustainable access to financial services, and
5. Encourage innovation and new partnerships by promoting and supporting strategic partnerships to build and expand the outreach and success of microcredit and microfinance.

== See also ==
- United Nations International Years
