= Aviation Without Borders =

Humanitarian Organization

- Founded: 2006
- Type: Voluntary association
- Purpose: Providing humanitarian assistance through aviation services
- Location: London
- Origins: Aviation sans Frontieres
- Region served: UK, Africa and overseas

Aviation Without Borders (AWB) is a British charity that provides aviation services in the United Kingdom and Africa. AWB is associated with Aviation sans frontières.

AWB is a charity founded in the UK (2006), and has a small office at the London Heathrow Airport.

AWB provides air transport services utilizing light aircraft to support other NGOs in developing countries and facilitates the shipment of humanitarian supplies via air cargo.
