= Anggun discography =

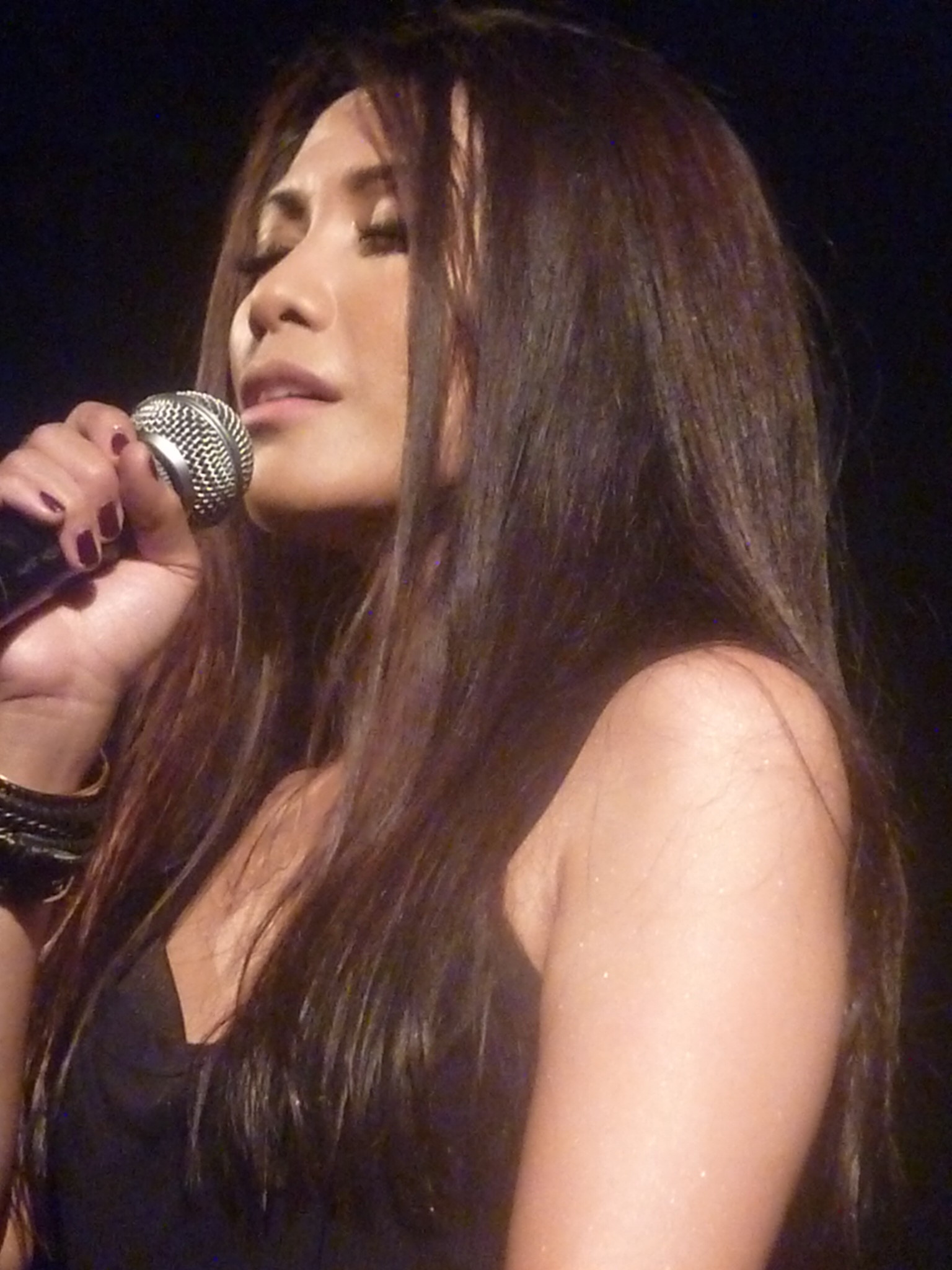
- Anggun performing in 2012
- Studio albums: 11
- Soundtrack albums: 2
- Singles: 38
- Music videos: 20
- Greatest hits: 3
- Single compilations: 7

The discography of Indonesian-born French singer-songwriter Anggun consists of eleven studio albums, (Note: Anggun's international studio albums were released in two standalone versions, English and French. If both versions are counted as separate albums, Anggun then has a total of 16 studio albums.) two soundtrack albums, three greatest hits albums, seven single compilations, 38 singles and 20 music videos. Anggun began performing at the age of seven and recorded a children's album two years later. Her debut studio album, Dunia Aku Punya, was released in 1986 under Billboard Indonesia, but did not achieve commercial success. Her popularity was later established after the success of the single "Mimpi", which was listed as one of the 150 Greatest Indonesian Songs of All Time. With the release of subsequent singles and three more studio albums— Anak Putih Abu Abu, Nocturno and Anggun C. Sasmi... Lah!!!—Anggun became one of the most successful Indonesian rock singers in the early 1990s. In 1993, she became the youngest Indonesian singer to found her own record company, Bali Cipta Records. By the age of 19, she had sold over four million albums in Indonesia.

In 1994, Anggun released a greatest hits album, Yang Hilang, and move to Europe to pursue an international career. In 1996, she signed to Columbia Records and released her first French-language album, Au nom de la lune. "La neige au Sahara" was released as the album first single and quickly became a hit in France, peaking at number 1 on the French Airplay Chart and number 16 on the French Singles Chart. The English version of the album, Snow on the Sahara, was released by Sony Music Entertainment in 33 countries across Asia, Europe and America. It sold over 2 million copies worldwide and was certified diamond. The single "Snow on the Sahara" topped the charts in Italy, Spain and several countries in Asia, and the top five on the UK Club Chart. In the United States, the album peaked at number 23 on the Billboard Heatseekers Albums Chart and shipped 200,000 units. The single also charted at number 16 on the Billboard Hot Dance Music/Club Play chart and number 22 on the Billboard Adult Top 40.

Anggun's second international album, Chrysalis (English version) and Desirs contraires (French version) was released in 2000 and was certified platinum. Its lead single "Still Reminds Me" reached the top five on the European Border Breakers Chart. Anggun released a soundtrack album to Danish film Open Hearts in 2002. The single "Open Your Heart" charted at number 51 on the Norwegian Singles Chart and earned Anggun a nomination for Best Song at the 2003 Robert Awards, the Danish equivalent of the Academy Awards. Her contract with Columbia and Sony Music ended in 2003 due to the company's structural change. She signed a new record deal with Heben Music, an independent label in France. In 2005, Anggun released her third international studio album, Luminescence, which shares the same title in both English and French. The album sold over 1 million copies worldwide and produced the single "Saviour", which was featured on the soundtrack of the film Transporter 2. The single topped the charts in France, Ukraine and Indonesia; "Undress Me" was also released in several countries, reaching number 1 in Turkey and Lebanon.

In 2008, Anggun released her fourth international album, Elevation, which saw her experiment with hip hop and urban music. Her first single "Crazy" was released for the international market, including the French version "Si tu l'avoues" and the Indonesian version, "Jadi Milikmu". She collaborated with Russian singer Max Lorens for the single "О нас с тобой", a version of the Russian single "No Song". In Indonesia, it sold over 550,000 copies album and was certified double platinum by ASIRI. The album however had the lowest sales in the whole of the international market.

Anggun's fifth international album, Echoes (English version) and Échos (French version) was released in May 2011 under the label April Earth. It produced two singles: "Mon meilleur amour" and "Je partirai". The single "Mon meilleur amour" topped the Indonesia Airplay and French International Airplay charts, also earning platinum status with sales of 300,500 copies. The album was certificated 4× platinum in 1 week in Indonesia. On November 20, 2015, Anggun released her sixth French-language album Toujours un ailleurs by TF1 Musique. It debuted at number 43 in France and Belgium.

== Albums ==
=== Studio albums ===
List of studio albums, with selected chart positions and certifications
Title	Album details	Peak chart positions										Sales	Certifications
Title	Album details	BEL	FIN	FRA	INA	ITA	MAS	SWI	SING	EU	US Heat	Sales	Certifications
Dunia Aku Punya	Released: 1986; Label: Billboard Indonesia; Formats: Cassette	—	—	—	—	—	—	—	—	—	—		
Anak Putih Abu Abu	Released: 1991; Label: Harpa Records; Formats: Cassette, CD, digital download	—	—	—	1	—	—	—	—	—	—		
Nocturno	Released: 1992; Label: Harpa Records; Formats: Cassette, CD, digital download	—	—	—	1	—	—	—	—	—	—		
Anggun C. Sasmi... Lah!!!	Released: 1993; Label: Bali Cipta Records; Formats: Cassette, CD	—	—	—	1	—	—	—	—	—	—		
Snow on the Sahara / Au nom de la lune	Released: June 23, 1997; Label: Columbia, Sony Music, Epic; Formats: Cassette, CD, digital download	—	40	34	1	7	3	-	1	69	23	WW: 2,000,000(as of 2015); FRA: 130,000; INA: 500,000(as of 2016); ITA: 300,000; US: 200,000	SNEP: Gold; ASIRI: 3× Platinum; FIMI: 2× Platinum; IFPI FIN: Gold; IFPI SWI: Gold; RIM: Platinum; PARI: Gold; RIAS: Gold
Chrysalis / Désirs contraires	Released: September 29, 2000; Label: Columbia, Sony Music; Formats: Cassette, CD, LP, digital download	—	—	48	1	10	—	60	—	—	—	WW: 1,200,000; FRA: 30,000; INA: 600,000	ASIRI: 4× Platinum; FIMI: Gold
Luminescence	Released: February 22, 2005; Label: Heben Music, Sony Music; Formats: Cassette, CD, LP, digital download	71	—	16	1	27	—	91	—	—	—	WW: 1,000,000; FRA: 121,000(as of 2015); INA: 450,000	SNEP: Gold; ASIRI: 4× Platinum; FIMI: Gold
Elevation	Released: October 20, 2008; Label: Heben Music, Sony Music, Warner; Formats: CD, Cassette, digital download	86	—	36	1	—	—	—	—	—	—		ASIRI: 7× Platinum
Echoes / Échos	Released: May 12, 2011; Label: April Earth, Sony Music, Warner; Formats: CD, Cassette, digital download	148	—	48	1	—	—	—	—	—	—	FRA: 15,000	ASIRI: 4× Platinum
Toujours un ailleurs	Released: November 20, 2015; Label: TF1 Musique; Formats: CD, digital download	43	—	43	—	—	—	—	—	—	—	FRA: 75,000	SNEP: Gold
8	Released: 8 December 2017; Label: Universal Music Group; Formats: CD, digital download	—	—	—	—	—	—	—	—	—	—		
"—" denotes releases that did not chart or were not released in that country.

=== Compilation albums ===
List of greatest hits albums, with selected chart positions and certifications
Title	Album details	Peak		Certifications
Title	Album details	INA	ITA	Certifications
Mimpi	Released: 1989; Label: Atlantic Records; Format: Cassette	—	—	INA: 1,000,000
Takut	Released: 1990; Label: Metrotama Records; Format: Cassette	—	—	INA: 500,000
Yang Hilang	Released: 1994; Label: Bali Cipta Records; Format: Cassette	—	—	
Best-Of	Released: 2006; Label: Sony BMG; Format: CD, DVD	1	97	ASIRI: 2× Platinum
Best-Of: Design of a Decade 2003–2013	Released: 2013; Label: April Earth; Format: CD, DVD	—	—	
"—" denotes releases that did not chart or were not released in that country.

=== Soundtrack albums ===
List of soundtrack albums
Title	Album details
Si Roy – Original Soundtrack (Note: Anggun sings the songs on the first half of the album, while the other half features solo performance by Dolf Wemay, Ajie Indra, Lady Avisha.)	Released: 1990; Label: Hins Collection; Format: Cassette
Open Hearts – Original Soundtrack	Released: 2002; Label: Columbia; Format: Cassette, CD

== Extended plays ==
List of single compilations
Title	Album details	Sales
Tua Tua Keladi	Released: 1990; Label: Atlantic Records; Format: Cassette	INA: 1,000,000
Laba Laba	Released: 1990; Label: Metrotama Records; Format: Cassette	
Di Kota Mati	Released: 1991; Label: Harpa Records; Format: Cassette	
Gaya Remaja	Released: 1991; Label: Harpa Records; Format: Cassette	
Katanya / Kontradiksi	Released: 1991; Label: Harpa Records; Format: Cassette	
Wind of Change (Best of Year)	Released: 1991; Label: Harpa Records; Format: Cassette	
Désirs Contraires	Released: 2000; Label: Kevin Organisation; Format: Cassette, Vinyl	
Still Reminds Me	Released: 2000; Label: Kevin Organisation; Format: Cassette, Vinyl	
Open your heart (Open hearts Soundtrack)	Released: 2002; Label: Truesoundtracks; Format: Cassette, Vinyl	
Si tu l'avoues/Crazy (Remixes)	Released: 2008; Label: April Earth - Warner Music France; Format: Cassette, CD	
Quelques mots d'amour	Released: 2013; Label: Warner Music France; Format: CD	
What We Remember: The US Remixes (Part II)	Released: 2018; Label: April Earth - Universal Music Group; Format: CD, Digital Play	
What We Remember: The US Remixes (Part III)	Released: 2018; Label: April Earth - Universal Music Group; Format: CD, Digital Play	
The Good is Back: The Remixes	Released: 2018; Label: April Earth - Universal Music Group; Format: CD, Digital Play	
Perfect World	Released: 2019; Label: April Earth - Universal Music Group; Format: CD, Digital Play	

== Singles ==
=== As lead artist ===
List of singles, with selected chart positions
Title	Year	Peak chart positions																				Album
Title	Year	BEL	FIN	FRA	FRA (Intl)	ITA	SWI	UKR	US Dance	US Adult Pop	SPA	GER	JAP	UK (Singles)	UK (Club Charts)	DU (Single)	EU (Billboard)	GRE	RU	UKR	BUL	Album
"Snow on the Sahara" "La neige au Sahara"	1997	24	20	16	1	1	24	—	16	22	16	55	5	184	5	—	—	—	—	—	—	Snow on the Sahara; Au nom de la lune
"A Rose in the Wind" "La rose des vents" "Kembali"	1997	—	—	49	—	17	—	—	—	—	—	—	—	—	—	—	—	—	—	—	—	Snow on the Sahara; Au nom de la lune
"Au nom de la lune"	1998	—	—	60	—	—	—	—	—	—	—	—	—	—	—	—	—	—	—	—	—	Snow on the Sahara; Au nom de la lune
"La ligne des sens" (as part of Sidaction (Contre la Sida 1998))	1998	—	—	1	1	—	—	—	—	—	—	—	—	—	—	—	—	—	—	—	—	Snow on the Sahara; Au nom de la lune / Ensemble
"La perle noire"	1999	—	—	—	—	—	—	—	—	—	—	—	—	—	—	—	—	—	—	—	—	—N/a
"Week-end à Rome" (as part of Les Enfoirés)	1999	—	—	—	—	—	—	—	—	—	—	—	—	—	—	—	—	—	—	—	—	Dernière Édition avant l'an 2000
"Il jouait du piano debout" (as part of Les Enfoirés)	1999	—	—	—	—	—	—	—	—	—	—	—	—	—	—	—	—	—	—	—	—	Dernière Édition avant l'an 2000
"Un geste d'amour" "Yang 'Ku Tunggu"	2000	—	—	62	—	—	—	—	—	—	—	—	—	—	—	—	—	—	—	—	—	Chrysalis; Désirs contraires
"Still Reminds Me" "Derrière la porte"	2000	—	—	—	3	17	—	—	—	—	—	—	—	—	—	—	—	—	—	—	—	Chrysalis; Désirs contraires
"Chrysalis"	2001	—	—	—	—	—	—	—	—	—	—	—	—	—	—	—	—	—	—	—	—	Chrysalis; Désirs contraires
"Tears of Sorrow"	2001	—	—	—	—	—	—	—	—	—	—	—	—	—	—	—	—	—	—	—	—	Chrysalis; Désirs contraires
"Open Your Heart"	2002	—	—	—	—	—	—	—	—	—	—	—	—	—	—	—	—	—	—	—	—	Open Hearts
"Counting Down"	2002	—	—	—	—	—	—	—	—	—	—	—	—	—	—	—	—	—	—	—	—	Open Hearts
"In Your Mind" "Être une femme"	2005	36	—	16	—	—	58	—	—	—	—	—	—	—	—	—	57	—	139	—	13	Luminescence
"Undress Me"	2005	—	—	—	—	13	—	—	—	—	—	—	—	—	—	—	—	—	—	—	—	Luminescence
"Saviour" "Cesse la pluie" (Note: The songs did not enter the Belgian Ultratop 50 singles chart, but charted on the Ultratip singles chart.) "Mantra"	2005	10	—	22	1	35	65	—	—	—	—	—	—	—	—	94	76	41	—	—	—	Luminescence
"I'll Be Alright" "Juste avant toi"	2006	—	—	28	4	—	—	1	—	—	—	—	—	—	—	—	91	—	46	—	—	Luminescence
"A Crime" "Garde moi"	2006	—	—	—	—	—	—	—	—	—	—	—	—	—	—	—	—	—	—	3	—	Luminescence
"Pour que tu sois libre" (with Leslie, Jennifer McCray, Natasha St-Pier, Elisa Tovati, Julie Zenatti)	2007	—	—	21	—	—	—	—	—	—	—	—	—	—	—	—	—	—	—	—	—	—N/a
"Mimpi"	2007	—	—	—	—	—	—	—	—	—	—	—	—	—	—	—	—	—	—	—	—	Best-of
"Crazy" "Si tu l'avoues" "Jadi Milikmu"	2008	—	—	—	6	—	—	—	—	—	—	—	—	—	—	—	—	—	—	—	—	Elevation; Élévation
"Berganti Hati"	2008	—	—	—	—	—	—	—	—	—	—	—	—	—	—	—	—	—	—	—	—	Elevation; Élévation
"My Man" "Si je t'emmène" (featuring Pras)	2008	—	—	—	11	—	—	—	—	—	—	—	—	—	—	—	—	—	—	—	—	Elevation; Élévation
"Let It Be Me"	2011	—	—	—	—	—	—	—	—	—	—	—	—	—	—	—	—	—	—	—	—	Bécaud: Et maintenant
"Only Love" "Mon meilleur amour" "Hanyalah Cinta"	2011	37	—	—	1	—	—	—	—	—	—	—	—	—	—	—	—	—	—	—	—	Echoes; Échos
"Je partirai"	2011	5	—	—	3	—	—	—	—	—	—	—	—	—	—	—	—	—	—	—	—	Echoes; Échos
"Il"(featuring Gérard Lenorman)	2011	—	—	—	—	—	—	—	—	—	—	—	—	—	—	—	—	—	—	—	—	Echoes; Échos
"Echo (You and I)"	2012	42	—	74	1	—	—	—	—	—	—	—	—	—	—	—	—	—	—	—	—	Echoes; Échos
"Quelques mots d'amour"	2012	—	—	—	—	—	—	—	—	—	—	—	—	—	—	—	—	—	—	—	—	Echoes; Échos
"Vivre d'amour" (with Natasha St-Pier)	2013	5	—	86	—	—	—	—	—	—	—	—	—	—	—	—	—	—	—	—	—	Thérèse – Vivre d'amour
"Snow on the Sahara" (2013 Version)	2013	—	—	—	—	—	—	—	—	—	—	—	—	—	—	—	—	—	—	—	—	Best-Of: Design of a Decade 2003–2013
"La neige au Sahara (Faço Chover No Deserto)" (with Tony Carreira)	2014	—	—	—	—	—	—	—	—	—	—	—	—	—	—	—	—	—	—	—	—	Nos fiançailles, France/Portugal
"Fly My Eagle"	2014	—	—	—	—	—	—	—	—	—	—	—	—	—	—	—	—	—	—	—	—	OST Pendekar Tongkat Emas
"Pour une fois" (with Vincent Niclo)	2015	—	—	167	—	—	—	—	—	—	—	—	—	—	—	—	—	—	—	—	—	Ce que je suis
"Let's Groove" (with David Foster, Melanie C and Vanness Wu)	2015	—	—	—	—	64	—	—	—	—	—	—	—	—	—	—	—	—	—	—	—	—N/a
"À nos enfants"	2015	—	—	—	—	—	—	—	—	—	—	—	—	—	—	—	—	—	—	—	—	Toujours un ailleurs
"Nos vies parallèles" (duet with Florent Pagny and featuring Yuri Buenaventura)	2015	39	—	47	3	—	121	—	—	—	—	—	—	—	—	—	—	—	—	—	—	Toujours un ailleurs
"Lepaskan" (with Regina Ivanova, Nowela Auparay, Cindy Bernadette, Chila Kiana)	2015	—	—	—	1	—	—	—	—	—	—	—	—	—	—	—	—	—	—	—	—	We Love Disney Indonesia
"Warna Angin"	2015	—	—	—	—	—	—	—	—	—	—	—	—	—	—	—	—	—	—	—	—	We Love Disney Indonesia
"Face au vent"	2016	—	—	—	—	—	—	—	—	—	—	—	—	—	—	—	—	—	—	—	—	Toujours un ailleurs
"Teka-teki" (duet with Tantri of Kotak)	2016	—	—	—	—	—	—	—	—	—	—	—	—	—	—	—	—	—	—	—	—	—N/a
"What We Remember"	2017	—	—	—	—	—	—	—	8	—	—	—	—	—	—	—	—	—	—	—	—	8
"The Good Is Back" (with Rossa or Fazura)	2018	—	—	—	—	—	—	—	20	—	—	—	—	—	—	—	—	—	—	—	—	8
"Siapa Bilang Gak Bisa"	2018	—	—	—	—	—	—	—	—	—	—	—	—	—	—	—	—	—	—	—	—	—N/a
"Tu est ma source" (with Roberto Alagna)	2022	—	—	—	—	—	—	—	—	—	—	—	—	—	—	—	—	—	—	—	—	Al Capone (Comedie Musicale)
"Votre amour d'enfance" (with Roberto Alagna)	2022	—	—	—	—	—	—	—	—	—	—	—	—	—	—	—	—	—	—	—	—	Al Capone (Comedie Musicale)
"Celui que j'aime"	2022	—	—	—	—	—	—	—	—	—	—	—	—	—	—	—	—	—	—	—	—	Al Capone (Comedie Musicale)
"Mon homme est un gangster"	2022	—	—	—	—	—	—	—	—	—	—	—	—	—	—	—	—	—	—	—	—	Al Capone (Comedie Musicale)
"—" denotes releases that did not chart or were not released in that country.

=== As featured artist ===
List of singles, with selected chart positions
Title	Year	Peak chart positions																		Album
Title	Year	BEL (Wal)	FIN	FRA	FRA (Intl)	INA	PT	ITA	MAL	SWI	UKR	IR	PH	SCO	UK	GRE	RO	RU	GER	Album
"Sa raison d'être" (featuring Anggun with various artists) (as part of Sidaction (Contre la Sida 1998)	1998	—	—	1	1	—	—	—	—	—	—	—	—	—	—	—	—	—	—	Ensemble
"Le Sud" (featuring Anggun with Alain Souchon and Maxime Le Forestier) (as part of Les Enfoirés)	1999	—	—	—	—	—	—	—	—	—	—	—	—	—	—	—	—	—	—	Dernière Édition avant l'an 2000
"Qui sait?" (featuring Anggun with Patrick Bruel, Stephan Eicher, Peter Gabriel, Faudel, Lââm, Lokua Kanza, Youssou N'Dour, Nourith, Axelle Red and Zucchero) (as part of Solidays)	2000	—	—	15	—	—	—	—	—	—	—	—	—	—	—	—	—	—	—	Solidays l'Album
"Que serai je demain?" (as part of Les Voix de l'Espoir)	2001	—	—	92	—	—	—	—	—	—	—	—	—	—	—	—	—	—	—	—N/a
"L'Un avec l'Autre" (featuring Anggun with Garou, Hélène Ségara, Assia, Patrick Fiori, Isabelle Boulay, Natasha St-Pier, Ménélik, Julie Zenatti, Damien Sargue, Bruno Pelletier, Célina Ramsauer, Mario Pelchat, Luck Mervil, Sally Nyolo, Khadja Nin, France D'Amour, Éric Lapointe, Véronic Dicaire, Faudel, and Lââm)	2001	—	—	—	—	—	—	—	—	—	—	—	—	—	—	—	—	—	—	L'Un avec l'Autre
"Over The Hill Of Secrets"	2001	—	—	—	—	—	—	—	—	—	—	—	—	—	—	—	—	—	—	Echoes from Earth
"Songe D'Argile"	2001	—	—	—	—	—	—	—	—	—	—	—	—	—	—	—	—	—	—	Echoes from Earth
"Summer in Paris" (DJ Cam featuring Anggun)	2002	—	—	—	—	—	—	41	—	—	11	—	—	—	—	—	—	—	—	Soulshine
"Amore immaginato" (Piero Pelù featuring Anggun)	2002	—	—	—	—	—	—	8	—	—	—	—	—	—	—	—	—	—	—	U.D.S. – L'uomo della strada
"Deep Blue Sea" (Deep Forest featuring Anggun)	2002	—	—	—	—	2	—	—	—	—	—	—	—	—	—	—	—	—	—	Music Detected
"World" (Alan Simon featuring Anggun & Zucchero)	2003	—	—	—	—	—	—	—	—	37	—	—	—	—	—	—	—	—	—	Gaïa (compilation) / Best-Of (Italian edition)
"The Wish" (Alan Simon featuring Anggun)	2003	—	—	—	—	—	—	—	—	—	—	—	—	—	—	—	—	—	—	Gaïa (compilation)
"Time Flies By" (E.P. Bergen featuring Anggun)	2003	—	—	—	—	—	—	—	—	—	—	—	—	—	—	—	—	—	—	Time Flies By (EP)
"Une île" (Serge Lama featuring Anggun)	2004	—	—	—	—	—	—	—	—	—	—	—	—	—	—	—	—	—	—	Pluri((elles))
"Kirana" / "Sang Penari" (Jose Barinaga featuring Anggun and Waluyo Wahyudi Mustafa)	2004	—	—	—	—	—	—	—	—	—	—	—	—	—	—	—	—	—	—	Katja Indonesia
"La mer est sans fin" (Tri Yann featuring Anggun)	2004	—	—	—	—	—	—	—	—	—	—	—	—	—	—	—	—	—	—	Marines
"If I Ever Lose My Faith in You" (Kelly & Beacco featuring Anggun)	2005	—	—	—	—	—	—	—	—	—	—	—	—	—	—	—	—	—	—	Akapela 1&1
"Et puis la terre..." (as part of A.S.I.E.)	2005	2	—	2	—	—	—	—	—	8	—	—	—	—	—	—	—	—	—	—N/a
"Tandem" (Lynnsha featuring Anggun)	2005	—	—	—	—	—	—	—	—	—	—	—	—	—	—	—	—	—	—	Tandem
"Catch You (Il coraggio di chiedere aiuto)" (Ron featuring Anggun)	2005	—	—	—	—	—	—	—	—	—	—	—	—	—	—	—	—	—	—	Ma quando dici amore
"Les filles d'Allah" (Fabrice Ach featuring Anggun)	2005	—	—	—	—	—	—	—	—	—	—	—	—	—	—	—	—	—	—	L'Homme Idéal?
"L'Or de nos vies" (as part of Fight Aids)	2006	14	—	5	—	—	—	—	—	43	—	—	—	—	—	—	—	—	—	—N/a
"Segalanya (All of You)" (Julio Iglesias featuring Anggun)	2006	—	—	—	—	—	—	—	—	—	—	—	—	—	—	—	—	—	—	Romantic Classics (Asian Edition)
"Tonight" (Reamonn featuring Anggun) French Version	2007	—	—	—	—	—	—	—	—	20	—	—	—	—	—	1	1	2	11	Wish
"Un Noël pour Tous"	2007	—	—	50	—	—	—	—	—	—	—	—	—	—	—	—	—	—	—	Un Noël pour Tous (single)
"Streets of Philadelphia" (I Muvrini featuring Anggun)	2007	—	—	—	—	—	—	—	—	—	—	—	—	—	—	—	—	—	—	I Muvrini et les 500 choristes
"Repartir" (featuring Cathialine Andria & Anggun)	2007	—	—	—	—	—	—	—	—	—	—	—	—	—	—	—	—	—	—	Le Roi Soleil: De Versailles à Monaco (Live)
"Un geste de vous" (featuring Lysa Ansaldi, Christophe Maé & Anggun)	2007	—	—	—	—	—	—	—	—	—	—	—	—	—	—	—	—	—	—	Le Roi Soleil: De Versailles à Monaco (Live)
"Pour que tu sois libre" (featuring Anggun, Elisa Tovati, Jennifer McCray, Julie Zenatti, Leslie, and Natasha St-Pier)	2007	—	—	—	—	—	—	—	—	—	—	—	—	—	—	—	—	—	—	La Rose Marie Claire – Pour Que Tu Sois Libre
"No Stress" (Laurent Wolf featuring Anggun)	2008	1	—	1	—	—	—	18	—	7	—	—	—	—	—	—	—	—	—	Wash My World (Deluxe Edition) / Elevation
"Chama por mim (Call My Name)" (Mickael Carreira featuring Anggun)	2009	—	—	—	—	—	4	—	—	—	—	—	—	—	—	—	—	—	—	Tudo o Que Eu Sonhei
"Always You" / "Innocent Lies" / "Blind" (with Schiller)	2010	—	—	—	—	—	—	—	—	—	—	—	—	—	—	—	—	—	—	Atemlos (Super Deluxe Edition)
"If" (featuring Anggun, Daniel Powter, M. Pokora, Caroline Costa, Natasha St. Pier, Justin Nozuka, Sofia Essaïdi, Lara Fabian, Tom Frager, Christophe Willem, Jenifer, Bob Sinclar, Joachim Garraud, Sliimy, and Victoria Abril)	2010	—	—	—	—	—	—	—	—	—	—	—	—	—	—	—	—	—	—	Message
"Je me reprends ma route" (as part of Les Voix de l'Enfant)	2012	—	—	—	—	—	—	—	—	—	—	—	—	—	—	—	—	—	—	Les Voix de l'Enfant
"Des ricochets" (as part of Collective Paris Africa)	2012	25	—	5	—	—	—	—	—	—	—	—	—	—	—	—	—	—	—	—N/a
"Né en 17 à Leidenstadt" (with Amaury Vassili & Damien Sargue)	2013	2	—	1	—	—	—	—	—	—	—	—	—	—	—	—	—	—	—	Génération Goldman Volume 2
"Kiss & Love"	2014	25	—	47	—	—	—	—	—	—	—	—	—	—	—	—	—	—	—	Kiss & Love
"Right Place Right Time" (DJ Indyana featuring Anggun)	2014	—	—	—	—	3 (Note: the song did not enter the Indonesian Singles Chart but peaked on Creative Disc Top 50 Chart at number 3.)	—	—	—	—	—	—	—	—	—	—	—	—	—	—N/a
"Who Wants to Live Forever" (Il Divo featuring Anggun)	2014	—	—	—	—	—	—	—	—	—	—	—	—	—	—	—	—	—	—	A Musical Affair (French Edition)
"Calling You"	2015	66	—	6	—	—	—	—	—	—	—	—	—	—	—	—	—	—	—	Les Stars font leur cinéma
"Tout est possible" (featuring Anggun with Dany Brillant, Garou, Gérard Lenorman, Julie Zenatti, Lisa Angell, Lorie, Natasha St-Pier, Patrick Fiori, Paul Ventimila, Sara Carreira, Véronique Jannot and Vincent Niclo)	2015	—	—	104	—	—	—	—	—	—	—	—	—	—	—	—	—	—	—	Martin & les fées
"Les pouvoirs de Zoulkiff" (featuring Anggun with Paul Ventimila, Idir and Véronique Jannot)	2015	—	—	—	—	—	—	—	—	—	—	—	—	—	—	—	—	—	—	Martin & les fées
"Sous la peinture" (featuring Anggun with Paul Ventimila, Arielle Dombasle, Julie Zenatti, Lisa Angell, Lorie, Michèle Laroque, Natasha St-Pier, Sara Carreira and Véronique Jannot)	2015	—	—	—	—	—	—	—	—	—	—	—	—	—	—	—	—	—	—	Martin & les fées
"Les plus beau de tes rêve" (featuring Anggun)	2015	—	—	—	—	—	—	—	—	—	—	—	—	—	—	—	—	—	—	Martin & les fées
"Chanson du tapes volant" (featuring Anggun and Idir)	2015	—	—	—	—	—	—	—	—	—	—	—	—	—	—	—	—	—	—	Martin & les fées
"If You Go Away" (Emin featuring Anggun)	2016	—	—	—	—	—	—	—	—	—	—	—	—	—	—	—	—	—	—	Love is a Deadly Game
"Sadeness (Part II)" / "Mother" / "Oxygen Red" (Enigma featuring Anggun)	2016	61	—	71	—	42	—	—	19	—	—	—	—	—	—	—	—	—	—	The Fall of a Rebel Angel (Standard Edition)
"Je tiens les renes" (Joyce Jonathan featuring Anggun for Mandarin/English & English/French versions)	2017	—	—	—	—	—	—	—	—	—	—	—	—	—	—	—	—	—	—	Ça ira
"Need You Now" (Shane Filan featuring Anggun)	2018	—	—	—	—	1	—	—	—	—	—	5	1	3	5	—	—	—	—	Love Always (Deluxe Edition)
"Désormais" (Dany Brillant featuring Anggun)	2021	4	—	—	—	—	—	—	—	—	—	—	—	—	—	—	—	—	—	Dany Brillant chante Aznavour en duo
"Un ange frappe à ma porte" (Natasha St-Pier featuring Anggun)	2021	—	—	—	—	—	—	—	—	—	—	—	—	—	—	—	—	—	—	Je n'ai que mon âme
"Mon Enfant" (Sako featuring Anggun)	2021	—	—	—	—	—	—	—	—	—	—	—	—	—	—	—	—	—	—	META
"Eli Hallo" (Lorenzo Licitra featuring Anggun)	2022	—	—	—	—	—	—	—	—	—	—	—	—	—	—	—	—	—	—	—N/a
"Signed Sealed Delivered" (Ach4Tet featuring Anggun)	2022	—	—	—	—	—	—	—	—	—	—	—	—	—	—	—	—	—	—	Stevie's Legacy
"Chanter" (Florent Pagny featuring Anggun)	2023	—	—	—	—	—	—	—	—	—	—	—	—	—	—	—	—	—	—	2bis
"Quand il s'en va" (Mario Pelchat featuring Anggun)	2024	—	—	—	—	—	—	—	—	—	—	—	—	—	—	—	—	—	—	—N/a
"—" denotes releases that did not chart or were not released in that country.

=== Promotional singles ===
List of promotional singles, showing year released and album name
Title	Year	Note	Album
"Dream of Me"	1997	The song was released in 1997 in Japan from Anggun to promote the album	Snow on the Sahara
"Life on Mars"	1998	Anggun recorded a cover version of this song in 1998 to promote Snow on the Sahara in the US territory	Snow on the Sahara
"Memory of Your Shores"	1998	The song was released in selected European countries to promote Snow on the Sahara	Snow on the Sahara
"Rain (Here Without You)"	2000	Anggun recorded a duet version of "Rain" with Jonas Winge Leisner for Scandinavian market	Chrysalis
"I Wanna Hurt You"	2002	The song was released as a 12" vinyl single in Italy in 2002 from Open Hearts	Open Hearts
"Shine"	2008	The song was used in Pantene commercial in 2008 for Asian market and received heavy airplay in Indonesian radios	Elevation
"О нас с тобой"	2008	Anggun recorded Russian version of "No Song" with Max Lorens to promote Elevation in Russia	Elevation
"Stronger" (featuring Big Ali)	2008	The song was used in Anlene commercial for South-East Asian territory	Elevation
"Sebelum Berhenti"	2008	Anggun recorded an Indonesian version of "Seize The Moment" to promote Elevation in Indonesia. The song peaked at number 7 on Indonesia Airplay Chart	Elevation
"Buy Me Happiness"	2011	These two singles were sent to Indonesian radio in July and October 2011 respectively to promote Echoes	Echoes
"Berkilaulah"	2011	These two singles were sent to Indonesian radio in July and October 2011 respectively to promote Echoes	Echoes
"Perfect World"	2015	The song was not released as a single but peaked at number 5 on the Dance Club Songs chart in September 2019.	Toujours un ailleurs
"Siapa Bilang Gak Bisa"	2018	The song was released as a stand-alone single. It used for Pantene commercial throughout 2018–2020 in Southeast Asia-region and received the most airplayed in numerous Indonesian radio stations.	—N/a

== Music videos ==
List of music videos, with director(s)
Title	Year	Director(s)
"Tegang"^{1}	1986	—
"Katakan Kita Rasakan"^{1} (as part of W.A.M.)	1989	—
"Kuserahkan"^{1} (as part of 6 Bintang Rock)	1989	—
"Kebyar-Kebyar"^{1} (as part of Artis Rock Indonesia)	1989	—
"Mimpi" (TVRI studio version)^{1}	1989	—
"Mimpi" (Hill version)^{1}	1989	—
"Bayang-Bayang Ilusi" (TVRI studio version)^{1}	1989	—
"Bayang-Bayang Ilusi" (Hill version)^{1}	1989	—
"Tua-Tua Keladi" (Highway-white hat version)^{1}	1990	—
"Tua-Tua Keladi" (TVRI version, rooftop version with Interview)^{1}	1990	—
"Tua-Tua Keladi" (TVRI alternative live studio version)^{1}	1990	—
"Takut" (TVRI version with Interview)^{1}	1990	—
"Laba-Laba"^{1}	1990	—
"Di Kota Mati"^{1}	1990	—
"Biar Daku Sendiri"^{1}	1990	—
"Menuju Matahari" (TVRI version with Interview)^{1}	1990	—
"Gaya Remaja"^{1}	1991	—
"Nafas Cinta"^{1}	1991	DJ Nawi
"Problema Cinta"^{1}	1992	—
"Kembalilah Kasih (Kita Harus Bicara)"	1993	Ria Irawan
"Kembalilah Kasih (Kita Harus Bicara)" (Sign language; short edited version)	1993	—
"Kembalilah Kasih (Kita Harus Bicara)" (TVRI version)"^{1}	1993	—
"Kembalilah Kasih (Kita Harus Bicara)" (Exhaust fan version)"^{1}	1993	—
"Yang Hilang"	1994	Christ Sinyal
"Snow on the Sahara" "La neige au Sahara"	1997	Philippe Gautier
"A Rose in the Wind" "La rose des vents"	1997	Jean-Baptiste Erreca
"Snow on the Sahara" (U.S. version)	1998	Anthea Benton
"Au nom de la lune"	1998	Jean-Baptiste Erreca
"Et puis la Terre..." (as part of A.S.I.E.)	2000	Julien Bloch, Yannick Saillet
"Yang 'Ku Tunggu" "Un geste d'amour"	2000	Jean-Baptiste Erreca
"Still Reminds Me" "Derrière la porte"	2000	Jean-Baptiste Erreca
"Chrysalis" "Tu mens"	2000	Jean-Baptiste Erreca
"Amore immaginato" (duet with Piero Pelù)	2003	Jean-Baptiste Erreca
"Sang Penari" (featuring with Waluyo Wahyudi Mustafa)	2004	Jose Barinaga
"In Your Mind" "Être une femme"	2005	Jean-Baptiste Erreca
"Saviour" "Cesse la pluie"	2005	Jean-Baptiste Erreca
"I'll Be Alright" "Juste avant toi"	2006	Jean-Baptiste Erreca
"A Crime" "Garde-moi" (featuring David Hallyday)	2007	Jean-Baptiste Erreca
"Mimpi (New Version)" (Live Video)	2007	Jay Subiyakto
"Bayang-Bayang Ilusi (New Version)" (Live Video)	2007	Jay Subiyakto
"Crazy" "Si tu l'avoues" "Jadi Milikmu"	2008	Ivan Grbovic
"My Man" "Si je t'emmène" (featuring Pras Fugees)	2008	Jean-Baptiste Erreca
"Berganti Hati"	2009	Jay Subiyakto
"Only Love" "Hanyalah Cinta"	2011	Jean-Baptiste Erreca
"Je partirai"	2011	Jean-Baptiste Erreca
"Mon meilleur amour"	2011	Roy Raz
"Echo (You and I)"	2012	Roy Raz
"A Nos Enfants"	2015	Darius Salimi
"Nos Vies Parallèles"^{2} (featuring Florent Pagny & Yuri Buenaventura)	2015	Darius Salimi
"Toujours Un Ailleurs"^{2}	2015	Darius Salimi
"Est-ce Que Tu Viendras?"^{2}	2015	Darius Salimi
"Mon Capitaine"^{2}	2015	Darius Salimi
"Née Quelque Part"^{2} (featuring Angélique Kidjo)	2015	Darius Salimi
"A quelques pas de nous"^{2}		Darius Salimi
"Nos Vies Parallèles" (featuring Florent Pagny & Yuri Buenaventura)	2015	Igreco
"Face Au Vent"	2016	Darius Salimi
"What We Remember"	2017	Roy Raz
"The Good Is Back" (featuring Fazura) (Studio Video)	2018	—
"Siapa Bilang Gak Bisa?"	2018	Leïla Sy

- ^{1} Music video made from an early TV special performance.
- ^{2} Music video made from Toujours un ailleurs les coulisses session
