= Best-Of: Design of a Decade 2003–2013 =

Greatest hits album by Anggun
- Released: May 10, 2013
- Recorded: 2004–2013
- Genres: Pop, pop rock, dance-pop
- Labels: April Earth, Sony
- Producer: Anggun

Anggun chronology
| Echoes (2011) | Best-Of: Design of a Decade 2003–2013 (2013) | Toujours un ailleurs (2015) |

Singles from Best-Of: Design of a Decade 2003–2013
- 1. "Snow on the Sahara (2013 Exclusive version)" Released: 20 March 2013

Best-Of: Design of a Decade 2003–2013 is a greatest hits album by Anggun, released on 10 May 2013 by Sony Music Indonesia. It comprises some of Anggun's notable works since her departure from Columbia Records (part of Sony Music Entertainment) in 2003. A sequel to her previous Best-Of album in 2006, the album included only one song, "Saviour", appearing on the previous compilation. The album features four unreleased tracks in Indonesia—"Echo (You and I)" (Full English Version) from its French CD single, "Lie to Me" from the European edition of Echoes, as well as her collaborations with German musician Schiller, "Blind" and "Innocent Lies". Anggun also re-recorded her debut international single, "Snow on the Sahara", which was released as a single to promote the album. An uptempo dance track, the new version was produced by Lebanese-Canadian musician K.Maro.

== Track listing ==
CD / digital download
| No. | Title | Writer(s) | Length |
|---|---|---|---|
| 1. | "Jadi Miliku (Crazy)" | Anggun, Wealstarr | 4:18 |
| 2. | "Saviour" (Main Theme from Transporter 2) | Anggun, Evelyne Kral, Frédéric Jaffré | 3:58 |
| 3. | "Buy Me Happiness" | Anggun, Vincent Baguian, Pilot, Rousseau | 3:11 |
| 4. | "Stronger" (featuring Big Ali) | Anggun, Jmi Sissoko, Tefa, Masta | 3:32 |
| 5. | "My Man" (featuring Pras Michel) | Anggun, Pras Michel, Jmi Sissoko, Stromae | 3:39 |
| 6. | "Hanyalah Cinta" | Anggun, Marie Bastide, Gioacchino Maurici | 4:04 |
| 7. | "Echo (You and I)" (Full English Version) | Anggun, Jean-Pierre Pilot, William Rousseau | 3:03 |
| 8. | "Sebelum Berhenti (Seize the Moment)" | Anggun, Denis Clavaud, Jmi Sissoko | 4:23 |
| 9. | "Lie to Me" | Anggun, Bastide, Christophe Cottin, Maurici | 4:20 |
| 10. | "A Crime" | Anggun, David Hallyday | 3:55 |
| 11. | "World" | Anggun, Tefa, Masta | 3:47 |
| 12. | "Blind" (with Schiller) | Anggun, Christopher von Deylen | 4:50 |
| 13. | "Innocent Lies" (with Schiller) | Anggun, Christopher von Deylen | 4:37 |
| 14. | "Snow on the Sahara" (2013 Exclusive Version) | Erick Benzi, Nikki Matheson | 3:56 |
| 15. | "Crazy" (Tomer G. & Roi Tochner Remix) | Anggun, Wealstarr | 4:11 |
| 16. | "Saviour" (Teetoff's Dance Remix) | Anggun, Evelyne Kral, Frédéric Jaffré | 3:50 |
| 17. | "Echo (You and I)" (Hakimakli Radio Edit) | Anggun, Jean-Pierre Pilot, William Rousseau | 3:50 |

DVD
| No. | Title | Director(s) | Length |
|---|---|---|---|
| 1. | "In Your Mind" | Jean-Baptiste Erreca |
| 2. | "Crazy" | Ivan Grbovic |
| 3. | "Saviour" (Uncensored Version) | Jean-Baptiste Erreca |
| 4. | "Echo (You and I)" (Full-Length Version) | Roy Raz |
| 5. | "My Man" (featuring Pras Michel) | Jean-Baptiste Erreca |
| 6. | "Hanyalah Cinta" | Jean-Baptiste Erreca |
| 7. | "A Crime" | Jean-Baptiste Erreca |
| 8. | "Only Love" | Jean-Baptiste Erreca |
| 9. | "Blind" (Live in Hamburg, Germany) |
| 10. | "Innocent Lie" (Live in Hamburg, Germany) |
| 11. | "Always You" (Live in Hamburg, Germany) |
| 12. | "Berganti Hati" | Jay Subiyakto |
| 13. | "Mon meilleur amour" | Roy Raz |
