= Best-Of (Anggun album) =

Greatest hits album by Anggun
- Released: 15 December 2006
- Recorded: 1996–2006
- Genre: Pop; pop rock; world; dance; R&B
- Language: English; Bahasa Indonesia
- Label: Sony BMG; Carosello Records

Anggun chronology
| Luminescence (2005) | Best-Of (2006) | Elevation (2008) |

Singles from Best-Of
- 1. "Mimpi (New Version)" Released: 20 July 2006 (Indonesia); 2. "I'll Be Alright" Released: 2007 (Italy); 3. "A Crime" Released: 2007 (Italy)

Best-Of is a greatest hits album by Indonesian and French singer Anggun. The album was released on 15 December 2006 in Indonesia by Sony BMG Indonesia. It is composed of English-language recordings from her first, second and third studio efforts Snow on the Sahara (1997), Chrysalis (2000) and Luminescence (2005), along with the Open Hearts soundtrack (2002) and collaborations with other artists. The album also featured Indonesian-language re-recorded hits such as "Mimpi", "Bayang Bayang Ilusi" and "Takut".

== Promotion and accolades ==
On December 14, 2006, Sony BMG Indonesia announced the Best-Of album to celebrate the first decade of Anggun's international career. The announcement detailed several promotions from December 18 to 22, including a fan meeting. Anggun stated,

This album is an offering for fans who want to have the entire collection of my best songs on one CD.

On December 20, Anggun received the Lifetime Achievement Award for "Best International Artist" at the 10th Anugerah Musik Indonesia Awards, honoring her as the first Indonesian artist to achieve international success.

Best-Of issue in Malaysia in May and Italy on 08 June 2007. That same year, its karaoke video album and a deluxe edition launched across these markets.

== Track listing ==
=== Indonesian / Malaysian edition ===
| No. | Title | Writer(s) | Length |
|---|---|---|---|
| 1. | "Mimpi" (New Version) | Teddy Sudjaja, Pamungkas NM | 5:36 |
| 2. | "Bayang-Bayang Ilusi" (New Version) | Teddy Sudjaja, Pamungkas NM | 4:42 |
| 3. | "Takut" (New Version) | Mus Mujiono, Deddy Dhukun | 5:36 |
| 4. | "I'll Be Alright" | Anggun, Alice L.B., Cyril Paulus | 3:07 |
| 5. | "In Your Mind" | Anggun, Jean-Pierre Taïeb | 3:18 |
| 6. | "Snow on the Sahara" (Special Radio Edit) | Erick Benzi, Nikki Matheson | 3:39 |
| 7. | "Undress Me" | Anggun, Jean-Pierre Taïeb | 3:30 |
| 8. | "Still Reminds Me" (Special Radio Edit) | Anggun, Erick Benzi | 3:25 |
| 9. | "Mantra" | Anggun, Evelyne Kral, Frédéric Jaffré | 3:44 |
| 10. | "Kembali" | Anggun, Erick Benzi | 4:25 |
| 11. | "Summer in Paris" (Radio Edit; DJ Cam featuring Anggun) | DJ Cam | 3:40 |
| 12. | "Chrysalis" (Hex Hector Pop Radio Edit) | Anggun, Erick Benzi | 3:33 |
| 13. | "Yang 'Ku Tunggu" | Anggun, Erick Benzi | 4:09 |
| 14. | "Deep Blue Sea" (Deep Forest featuring Anggun) | Anggun, Eric Mouquet, Michel Sanchez | 4:12 |
| 15. | "Open Your Heart" (Open Hearts Soundtrack) | Anggun, Jesper Winge Leisner, Niels Brinck | 3:27 |
| 16. | "A Rose in the Wind" (Chris Lord-Alge Remix) | Erick Benzi, Nikki Matheson | 4:00 |
| 17. | "Still Reminds Me" (Jason Nevins Midtempo Radio Edit) | Anggun, Erick Benzi | 3:33 |
| 18. | "Saviour" (Teetoff's Dance Radio Edit) | Anggun, Evelyne Kral, Frédéric Jaffré | 3:50 |
| 19. | "Snow on the Sahara" (Amen Radio Edit) | Erick Benzi, Nikki Matheson | 4:22 |

Bonus VCD – Exclusive to CD version
| No. | Title | Length |
|---|---|---|
| 1. | "Snow on the Sahara" |
| 2. | "A Rose in the Wind" |
| 3. | "Still Reminds Me" |
| 4. | "Yang 'Ku Tunggu" |
| 5. | "Chrysalis" (Hex Hector Video Mix) |
| 6. | "Deep Blue Sea" (Deep Forest featuring Anggun) |
| 7. | "In Your Mind" |
| 8. | "Saviour" (Transporter 2 Soundtrack) |
| 9. | "I'll Be Alright" |
| 10. | "Anggun's Exclusive Interview" |
| 11. | "Still Reminds Me" (Jason Nevins Video Mix) |

Best-Of Karaoke VCD/DVD
| No. | Title | Length |
|---|---|---|
| 1. | "Mimpi" |
| 2. | "Bayang Bayang Ilusi" |
| 3. | "In Your Mind" |
| 4. | "I'll Be Alright" |
| 5. | "Saviour" |
| 6. | "Snow on the Sahara" |
| 7. | "A Rose in the Wind" |
| 8. | "Still Reminds Me" |
| 9. | "Chrysalis" |
| 10. | "Yang 'Ku Tunggu" |
| 11. | "Deep Blue Sea" (Deep Forest featuring Anggun) |

=== Italian edition ===
| No. | Title | Writer(s) | Length |
|---|---|---|---|
| 1. | "I'll Be Alright" (Previously unreleased) | Anggun, Alice L.B., Cyril Paulus | 3:07 |
| 2. | "Snow on the Sahara" (Special Radio Edit) | Erick Benzi, Nikki Matheson | 3:39 |
| 3. | "Undress Me" | Anggun, Jean-Pierre Taïeb | 3:30 |
| 4. | "Amore Immaginato" (Duet with Piero Pelù) | Anggun, Piero Pelù | 4:21 |
| 5. | "Still Reminds Me" (Special Radio Edit) | Anggun, Erick Benzi | 3:25 |
| 6. | "A Rose in the Wind" (Chris Lord-Alge Remix) | Erick Benzi, Nikki Matheson | 4:00 |
| 7. | "Chrysalis" (Hex Hector Pop Radio Edit) | Anggun, Erick Benzi | 3:33 |
| 8. | "Saviour" (Music from the Motion Picture Transporter Extreme) | Anggun, Evelyne Kral, Frédéric Jaffré | 3:50 |
| 9. | "Summer in Paris" (DJ Cam featuring Anggun) | DJ Cam | 3:40 |
| 10. | "World" (Duet with Zucchero) | Alan Simon | 3:50 |
| 11. | "In Your Mind" | Anggun, Jean-Pierre Taïeb | 3:18 |
| 12. | "Open Your Heart" (Music from the Motion Picture Open Hearts) | Anggun, Jesper Winge Leisner, Niels Brinck | 3:27 |
| 13. | "A Crime" (Previously unreleased) | Anggun, David Hallyday | 3:55 |
| 14. | "Mimpi" (Previously unreleased) | Teddy Sudjaja, Pamungkas NM | 5:36 |
| 15. | "Snow on the Sahara" (Amen Radio Edit) | Erick Benzi, Nikki Matheson | 4:22 |
| 16. | "Still Reminds Me" (Jason Nevins Uptempo Radio Remix) | Anggun, Erick Benzi | 4:45 |
| 17. | "I'll Be Alright" (Teetoff's Dance Radio Edit) | Anggun, Alice L.B., Cyril Paulus | 3:05 |

Deluxe edition bonus DVD
| No. | Title | Length |
|---|---|---|
| 1. | "Snow on the Sahara" |
| 2. | "A Rose in the Wind" |
| 3. | "Still Reminds Me" |
| 4. | "Still Reminds Me" (Jason Nevins Video Mix) |
| 5. | "Chrysalis" (Hex Hector Video Mix) |
| 6. | "Amore Immaginato" (Duet with Piero Pelù) |
| 7. | "In Your Mind" |
| 8. | "Saviour" (Music from the Motion Picture Transporter Extreme) |
| 9. | "I'll Be Alright" (Previously unreleased) |
| 10. | "A Crime" (Previously unreleased) |
| 11. | "Anggun's Exclusive Interview" (Bonus Video) |
