= Elevation (Anggun album) =

- English version artwork

Studio album by Anggun
- Released: 20 October 2008
- Recorded: 2007–2008
- Genre: Hip hop; R&B; dance-pop
- Length: 48:45 (English version); 47:43 (French version)
- Language: English; French
- Label: Heben Music
- Producer: Tefa & Masta

Anggun chronology
Best-Of (2006)	Elevation (2008)	Echoes (2011)

Singles from Elevation
- 1. "Crazy" Released: June 30, 2008; 2. "My Man" Released: 2008

Elevation is the fourth international studio album by Indonesian singer-songwriter, Anggun. The album was released with the same title for the English-language version and the French-language version. The album was certified Gold Export Award for its sales outside France.

== Background ==
After a long year from "Luminescence" era, a third successful studio album, certified gold in France and abroad, the Indonesian singer feels more than ever. "I didn't, at all, feel like the weaker sex. Well, a woman is rich. We live more things psychologically and emotionally. We can do many things at once and we must be proud," said Anggun.

"Elevation" is a new ambitious project, which exposed the sensuality of Anggun on urban unexpected rhythms, produced by Tefa & Masta (several songs are co-written by Diam's, Sniper, Sinik, Kool Shen, Rohff, and Sako) and including prestigious collaborations with Pras of the Fugees, Sinik, Big Ali, and also Tunisiano. "I appreciated the urban music but the world of hip-hop in me remains unknown," said Indonesian singer, referring to the period preceding his meeting with thunderbolt Tefa & Masta. "I was fan of the last album of Nelly Furtado, and I found her amazing musical evolution was successful. Surprise while continuing to provide what is expected of me. I like to cover their tracks as I did with DJ Cam for example."

In preparation for "Elevation", Anggun has worked hard in the studio for nearly two years, in an exceptional because at the same time she also gave birth to her daughter, Kirana. "Because of my situation, the album was built in the softness and serenity," said Anggun. "It was pretty easy for finally work together. It was initially chosen themes music loops that we finally created in the studio. Then we composed melodies. It was all new to me, I've never worked like this before. It was a big challenge and I love the final result."

== Composition ==
Elevation became Anggun's first French release to be fully co-written by her. Anggun was assisted by Jmi Sissoko in writing and studio work. Together, they shared their values of integrity, respect, family and demand. "It was like a family, I've never experienced something so intense, such an understanding at personal and professional". Anggun then decided to employ members of her new musical family on her papers, including French rappers. The singer was surrounded by Tunisiano ("Plus Forte") and Sako dog Flaw ("Rien à écrire", "Si je t'emmène", "Tentation").

After the latter, a slameuse, Julie Grignon, who brought sweetness and candor to original title "J'ignorais tout", Anggun has even offered the prestigious collaborations with Pras of the Fugees and Big Ali, not to mention a participation with the guitarist Järvelä Bruno, a member of rock band French Indochina, on the original song "Plus forte". "Cette Nuit" expresses a voluptuous sensuality, "Si Tu L'avoues" offers a strong statement of love, "Le Temps Perdu" presents a painful admission of failure, while "Eden in Her Eyes" marks a break on a folk acoustic guitar in honor of her daughter, Kirana.

== Track listing ==
=== French version ===
All tracks are written by Anggun with others noted.

Élévation – Double-album edition (Disc 1) / French standard edition
No.	Title	Writer(s)	Length
1.	"J'ignorais tout" (featuring Sinik)	Julie Grignon; Jmi Sissoko; Wealstarr	4:22
2.	"Si tu l'avoues"	Grignon; Wealstarr	3:59
3.	"Hymne à la vie"	Denis Clavaud; Nadine Legat; Sissoko	4:24
4.	"Rien à écrire"	Sako; Sissoko	4:13
5.	"Le Bluffeur" (interlude)	Cyril Montana	0:23
6.	"Si je t'emmène" (featuring Pras Michel)	Michel; Sako; Sissoko; Stromae	3:39
7.	"Plus forte" (featuring Big Ali)	Masta; Sissoko; Tefa; Tunisiano	3:33
8.	"Cette nuit"	Sako; Sissoko; Wealstarr	3:43
9.	"Tentation"	K-Reen; Sako; Wealstarr	3:18
10.	"Le Temps perdu"	Damien; Sissoko; Wealstarr	3:28
11.	"Est-ce un hasard?"	Grignon; Barði Jóhannsson	3:44
12.	"Selamat Tidur" (interlude)		0:38
13.	"Eden in Her Eyes"	Masta; Tefa	4:32
14.	"Un jour sur terre"	Evelyne Kral; Masta; Tefa	3:47
Total length:			47:43

All tracks are written by Anggun and Wealstarr.

Élévation – French iTunes Store deluxe edition (bonus tracks)
No.	Title	Length
15.	"Si tu l'avoues" (Music Video)	3:48
16.	"Si tu l'avoues" (Laurent Wolf Club Mix)	5:47
17.	"Si tu l'avoues" (Tomer G & Roi Tochner Club Mix)	8:27
18.	"Si tu l'avoues" (Laurent Wolf Radio Edit)	3:17
19.	"Si tu l'avoues" (Tomer G & Roi Tochner Radio Edit)	4:13
20.	"Crazy" (Laurent Wolf Club Mix)	5:47
21.	"Crazy" (Tomer G & Roi Tochner Club Mix)	8:29
22.	"Crazy" (Tomer G & Roi Tochner Radio Edit)	4:13
23.	"Crazy" (Radio Edit)	3:57

=== English version ===
All tracks are written by Anggun with others noted.

Elevation – Double-album edition (Disc 2)
No.	Title	Writer(s)	Length
1.	"A Change"	Sissoko; Wealstarr	3:05
2.	"Crazy"	Wealstarr	4:21
3.	"Seize the Moment"	Clavaud; Sissoko	4:24
4.	"No Song"	Sissoko	4:13
5.	"My Man" (featuring Pras Michel)	Michel; Sissoko; Stromae	3:39
6.	"Stronger" (featuring Big Ali)	Masta; Sissoko; Tefa	3:33
7.	"Give It to Love"	Sissoko; Wealstarr	3:43
8.	"Hide and Run"	K-Reen; Wealstarr	3:18
9.	"Divine"	Sissoko; Wealstarr	3:28
10.	"Is It a Sign?"	Jóhannsson	3:44
11.	"World"	Masta; Tefa	3:49
12.	"Si tu l'avoues" (Laurent Wolf Radio Edit)	Grignon; Wealstarr	3:17
13.	"Si tu l'avoues" (Tomer G & Roi Tochner Radio Edit)	Grignon; Wealstarr	4:11
Total length:			48:45

All tracks are written by Anggun with others noted.

Elevation – Asian edition
No.	Title	Writer(s)	Length
1.	"A Change"	Sissoko; Wealstarr	3:05
2.	"Jadi Milikmu (Crazy)"	Wealstarr	4:18
3.	"Sebelum Berhenti (Seize The Moment)"	Clavaud; Sissoko	4:23
4.	"Berganti Hati (No Song)"	Sissoko	4:13
5.	"My Man" (featuring Pras Michel)	Michel; Sissoko; Stromae	3:39
6.	"Stronger" (featuring Big Ali)	Sissoko; Tefa; Masta	3:32
7.	"Give It to Love"	Sissoko; Wealstarr	3:42
8.	"Hide and Run"	Kreen; Wealstarr	3:17
9.	"Divine"	Wealstarr; Sissoko	3:28
10.	"Is It a Sign?"	Jóhannsson	3:42
11.	"Selamat Tidur" (interlude)		0:41
12.	"Eden in Her Eyes"	Tefa; Masta	4:32
13.	"World"	Tefa; Masta	3:47
14.	"Crazy" (Laurent Wolf Radio Edit)	Wealstarr	4:18
15.	"Stronger" (No Rap Version)	Sissoko; Tefa; Masta	3:32
16.	"Shine" (TV Song)	Morgan Visconti; Rosi Golan	3:01
17.	"No Stress" (Laurent Wolf featuring Anggun)	Wolf; Jeremy Hills; Eric Carter	3:18

All tracks are written by Anggun with others noted.

Elevation – Russian edition
No.	Title	Writer(s)	Length
1.	"A Change"	Sissoko; Wealstarr	3:05
2.	"Crazy"	Wealstarr	4:21
3.	"Seize the Moment"	Clavaud; Sissoko	4:24
4.	"О нас с тобой" (featuring Max Lorens)	Sissoko	4:13
5.	"My Man" (featuring Pras Michel)	Michel; Sissoko; Stromae	3:39
6.	"Stronger" (featuring Big Ali)	Sissoko; Tefa; Masta	3:32
7.	"Give It to Love"	Sissoko; Wealstarr	3:42
8.	"Hide and Run"	Kreen; Wealstarr	3:17
9.	"Divine"	Wealstarr; Sissoko	3:28
10.	"Is It a Sign?"	Jóhannsson	3:42
11.	"World"	Tefa; Masta	3:47
12.	"Saviour"	Kral; Frédéric Jaffré	3:44
13.	"I'll Be Alright"	Alice L.B.; Cyril Paulus	3:07
14.	"Saviour" (Teetoff's Dance Radio Edit)	Jean-Pierre Taïeb	3:50
15.	"In Your Mind"	Taïeb	3:28
16.	"Crazy" (Tomer G. & Roi Tochner Radio Edit)	Wealstarr	4:11
17.	"No Song"	Sissoko	4:13

== Singles ==
French singles

1. "Si Tu L'avoues" (First single from the album)
2. "Si Je T'emmene" (featuring Pras Michel)

International singles

1. "Crazy" (English version of "Si Tu L'avoues") - International first single
2. "My Man"

Singles released in Indonesia:

1. "Jadi Milikmu (Crazy)" - #1 in Indonesian Airplay Chart and #1 in Indonesian Singles Chart
2. "Berganti Hati" (Indonesian version of "No Song") - #10 in Indonesian Airplay Chart
3. "Sebelum Berhenti" (Indonesian version of "Seize the Moment") - #07 in Indonesian Airplay Chart and reached top 5 in many radio stations' charts in the region

== Charts ==
=== Weekly charts ===
Chart (2008)	Peak position
Belgian Albums (Ultratop Wallonia)	86
French Albums (SNEP)	36
Indonesian Albums (ASIRI)	1

== Certifications ==
Country (Provider)	Certifications
France (Bureau Export)	Gold Export
Indonesia (ASIRI)	7× Platinum

== Release history ==
Region	Date	Label	Edition(s)	Format(s)
Belgium	20 October 2008	Heben Music, Warner Music Benelux	Élévation (French standard edition)	CD; digital download
France	20 October 2008	Heben Music, Warner Music France	Élévation (French standard edition)	CD; digital download
Indonesia	1 December 2008	Sony Music Indonesia	Elevation (Indonesian edition)	CD
Malaysia	20 March 2009	Metadome Records	Elevation (Indonesian edition)	CD
Russia	21 July 2009	Warner Music International	Elevation (Russian edition)	CD
