= Corson (singer) =

French singer-songwriter

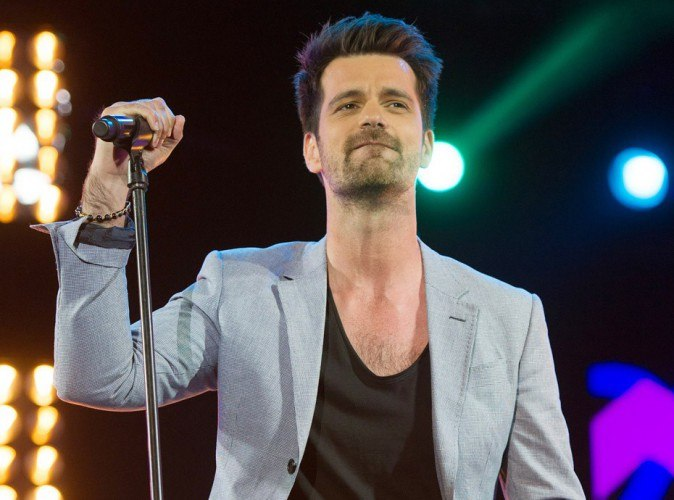
- Corson

Background information
- Born: Alain Cordier; 25 November 1979 (age 46); Thionville, France
- Origin: France
- Genres: Chanson, French pop
- Years active: 2001–present
- Labels: Polydor Records
- Website: corson.eu

Alain Cordier (French pronunciation: [alɛ̃ kɔʁdje]; born 25 November 1979 in Thionville), better known by his stage name Corson, is a French singer-songwriter. He is a versatile singer with a characteristic tenor lyrical voice and classical singing techniques but equally efficient as a pop rock performer. Corson is also the name of his musical pop rock group. His debut 11-track album The Rainbow was released on Polydor in January 2015.

== Biography ==
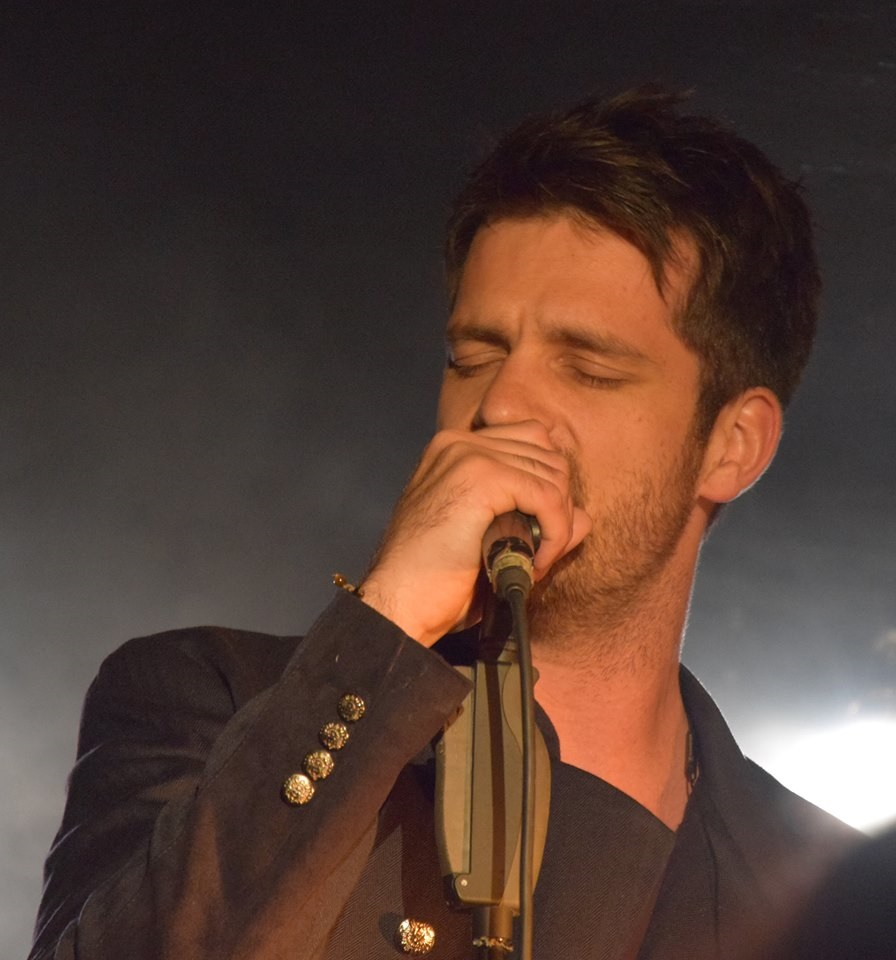
Corson

Corson with encouragement of his mother studied piano at age 8. At 17 years, he took classical singing classes at the Thionville music conservatory also becoming the vocalist for the band Samsara, a funk group he formed with his high school friend. He also entered Thionville Conservatory and later Asnières Conservatory specializing in lyrical singing. He took part in a number of musical comedies touring various French venues.

Cordier also graduated with a diploma in International Commerce and worked for a time in a Luxembourg bank before quitting to concentrate all his time to music. At 21, he decided to move to Paris and to attempt a musical career. In 2003, he played in Belles belles belles (a musical based on Claude François' songs) and in Roméo et Juliette by Gérard Presgurvic.

He wrote songs for Amaury Vassili, Joy Esther and in 2009 his meeting with producer Selim Mouhoubi and his Selisam Productions company was very critical in developing his career. Alain Cordier decided to change his artistic name to Corson in memory of his mother being the first syllables of his mother's given name and surname.

In 2011, an EP titled Corson released with 5 tracks on label Mercury Records. The singles The Rainbow, We'll Come Again, Raise Me Up were broadcast on French radios Virgin Radio, RTL, NRJ.

In 2014, Sophie-Tith invited Corson on her album. He also opened concerts by Skip the Use, Boy George, Imagine Dragons, Lisa Stansfield, Laura Pausini at Zénith de Paris, Morten Harket at Olympia, Calogero at Palais Omnisports de Paris-Bercy. Corson also performed in solo concerts at Le Divan du Monde and Café de la Danse. A new single Loud released in July 2014.

His song We'll Come Again can be heard in Lancôme's commercial for the fragrance "La Vie est belle" with Julia Roberts.

== Style ==
Corson discovered U2 as an adolescent and tried to sing like Bono and Luciano Pavarotti on the duet Miss Sarajevo who inspired him the single We'll come again. He has an operatic voice who serves melancholic lyrics and melodies. He illustrates his songs by artistic video clips. Corson reminds Brad Pitt's Meet Joe Black for We'll come again.

== Charity involvement ==
He supports the association Rafael Lorraine, a charity created for helping sick children.

== Discography ==
=== Albums ===
Year	Album	Peak positions		Certification	Notes
Year	Album	FR	BEL (Wa)	Certification	Notes
2015	The Rainbow	–	–		Track list: 1. "Raise Me Up (Je respire encore)" 2. "The Rainbow"; 3. "Loud"; 4. "We'll Come Again"; 5. "Start the War"; 6. "Made of Pain"; 7. "Make a Stand"; 8. "Eldorado"; 9. "The Rain"; 10. "The Other Side"; 11. "Lost in the Air"

=== EPs ===
- 2011 : Corson, EP
- 2014 : Loud, EP

=== Singles ===
Year	Single	Peak positions		Album
Year	Single	FR	BEL (Wa)	Album
2012	"We'll Come Again"	–	–	Corson
2013	"The Rainbow"	42	–	Corson
2014	"Raise Me Up (Je respire encore)"	58	36* (Ultratip)	Corson
2014	"Loud"	–	–	Loud
2014	"Ces choses-là" (duet with Sophie-Tith)	–	–	J'aime ça
2015	"Sonia"	–	–	
2016	"Je respire comme tu mens"	–	–	

*Did not appear in the official Belgian Ultratop 50 charts, but rather in the bubbling under Ultratip charts.

=== Collaborations ===
- 2006 : Nos Instants de liberté by Liza Pastor and Amaury Vassili
- 2007 : L'Hôpital, tv series
- 2014 : Éphémère by Louis Delort and The Sheperds
- 2015 : We are sailors by Mathieu, finalist of the Nouvelle Star
- 2015 : Edge of the world, Reaching Up, Its over on the album Mission Control Alive by Mission Control and David Hallyday

=== Participations ===
- 2014 : Le Chemin de Pierre for the Abbé Pierre's Foundation, clip
- 2014 : Kiss & Love for the Sidaction

== Musicals ==
- 2003–2004 : Belles belles belles, dir by Redha – Olympia, tour
- 2003 : War by Christophe Borie, Stéphane Metro and Franck Varnava – Festival des Musicals de Paris
- 2009 : Roméo et Juliette, de la haine à l'amour by Gérard Presgurvic, dir Redha – South Korea : understudy of Prince, Frère Laurent and Lord Capulet
