= Echoes (Anggun album) =

- English version artwork

Studio album by Anggun
- Released: 20 May 2011
- Recorded: 2010–2011
- Genres: Pop; pop rock; dance-pop
- Length: 55:38 (English version); 45:29 (French version)
- Languages: English; French
- Labels: April Earth; Warner; Sony
- Producer: Anggun

Anggun chronology
Elevation (2008)	Echoes (2011)	Best-Of: Design of a Decade 2003–2013 (2013)

Échos
- French version artwork

Echoes (English version) / Échos (French version) is the fifth international studio album by Indonesian recording artist Anggun. The English version was first released by Sony Music in Anggun's native country on 20 May 2011 and the French version was released by Warner Music in Belgium on 4 November 2011. The album was re-packaged in 2012 to promote her participation in the Eurovision Song Contest 2012. The album was produced by Anggun—the first time since her international career—under her own record label April Earth. She co-wrote all original materials on Echoes, alongside Gioacchino Maurici, Pierre Jaconelli, Jean-Pierre Pilot and William Rousseau. However, Échos also became her first French album on which she does not have any writing credit.

Upon its release, Echoes topped the Indonesian Albums Chart and was certified platinum in the first week. It eventually received quadruple platinum and became the best-selling pop album of 2011 in Indonesia. Meanwhile, Échos reached number 48 on the French Albums Chart and has sold over 15,000 copies in France. Echoes received Gold Export Award for its sales outside France. Singles released were "Only Love"/"Hanyalah Cinta", "Buy Me Happiness", "Berkilaulah" and "Echo (You and I)" from Echoes, as well as "Je partirai", "Mon meilleur amour", "Echo (You and I)" and "Quelques mots d'amour" from Échos.

== Production and release ==
The album was made by Anggun in two production teams: Gioacchino Maurici and Pierre Jaconelli on the one hand, and the duo of Jean-Pierre Pilot and William Rousseau on the other. Anggun produced and co-wrote all original material for Echoes. Meanwhile, Échos is Anggun's first album sung entirely in French (as previous albums had songs or interludes in English or Indonesian) as well as her first French album where she does not have any writing credit.

Of their collaboration, Maurici said: "I love [Anggun's] timbre. I'd been wanting to work with her for a while. I found in her the very same depth of personality that I liked about her voice." Jean-Pierre Pilot and William Rousseau were coming off the back of major successes in France when they met Anggun. "What surprised us was the contrast between the simple, fun-loving woman we had in front of us and the image of the superstar diva we know from her videos or live performances. The two personalities coexist inside her in perfect harmony," William Rousseau explains. "As a result, we were keen to explore her more private side without going off into completely pared-down musical style."

== Composition ==
The album's first single, "Only Love"", is an Irish-influenced track which deals with the quest for true and unconditional love. "A Stranger" timidly speaks of the loneliness and fear of the unknown that were often a feature of the singer’s constant moving around. Whereas a few years ago Anggun still sang of exile as a painful experience, now she knows where she is headed, as she has accepted that her destiny will always be bound up with travelling. "Year of the Snake" is a restrained song that gives the thoughts of a woman remembering painful momentsof her life. And yet, without any excess exoticism or pointless clichés, you find subtle traces of the singer’s Indonesian roots via the various subjects she tackles. "Eternal" talks of accepting the death of a loved one, without seeking to squeeze a tear out of the listener at any cost. On the other hand, the extremely sensual "Rollercoaster", composed by Axel Bauer, conjures up the passion and sense of drama that can be part of the singer's life as well. Many women will identify with the themes of the album: an upbeat girl’s power message in "Weapons", the weariness of "My Addiction" or the acceptance of who we really are in "Impossible". Anggun reveals herself to be both mischievous and totally fulfilled. Yet the power of the melodies does not supplant the emotion, as illustrated by the bittersweet "Buy me happiness" and the discreet "Silent vow".

== Singles ==
"Only Love", along with its Indonesian version "Hanyalah Cinta", was released as the lead single from Echoes in Indonesia in April 2011. The single became a number-one airplay hit in the country. Two more singles were sent to Indonesian radio: "Buy Me Happiness" in July and "Berkilaulah" in October 2011. "Je Partirai" served as the lead single from Échos for French-speaking territories in May 2011. It peaked at number five on Belgian Ultratip Chart, while reaching number three on French International Airplay Chart compiled by Francophonie Diffusion. The music videos for "Only Love", "Hanyalah Cinta" and "Je partirai" were shot in one session by French director Jean-Baptiste Erreca in Bangkok, Thailand.

A new version of "Mon meilleur amour" was released as the second single off the French version on 28 October 2011. Its music video was directed in Romania by French director Roy Raz. French entry for Eurovision Song Contest 2012, "Echo (You and I)", was released on 30 January 2012 as the third single from Échos and the lead single from the international edition of Echoes. Roy Raz again directed its music video. For the promotional intentions, Keo, Claudia Faniello, Niels Brinck, and Varga Viktor are featuring in this song for special editions, each for Romania, Malta, Denmark, and Hungary. The fourth and final single from Échos, "Quelques mots d'amour", was released onto iTunes on 16 March 2012. A digital extended play titled Quelques mots d'amour was released a year later, featuring the single alongside three ballads off Échos and one ballad off her previous album Elevation.

== Track listing ==
=== English version ===
Echoes – International edition
No.	Title	Writer(s)	Length
1.	"Echo (You and I)"	Anggun, Jean-Pierre Pilot, William Rousseau	2:59
2.	"Buy Me Happiness"	Anggun, Vincent Baguian, Pilot, Rousseau	3:11
3.	"Only Love"	Anggun, Marie Bastide, Gioacchino Maurici	4:04
4.	"Weapons"	Anggun, Baguian, Pilot, Rosseau	3:09
5.	"Lie to Me"	Anggun, Bastide, Christophe Cottin, Maurici	4:20
6.	"Impossible"	Anggun, Baguian, Pilot, Rosseau	3:11
7.	"Eternal"	Anggun, Bastide, Maurici	3:55
8.	"Rollercoaster"	Anggun, Alain Ekpop, Axel Bauer	4:31
9.	"My Addiction"	Anggun, Baguian, Pilot, Rosseau	2:58
10.	"A Stranger"	Anggun, Bastide, Maurici	3:48
11.	"Cold War"	Anggun, Bastide, Maurici	3:58
12.	"Year of the Snake"	Anggun, Bastide, Maurici	4:40
13.	"Silent Vow"	Anggun, Baguian, Pilot, Rosseau	3:15
14.	"Let It Be Me"	Gilbert Bécaud, Manny Curtis, Pierre Delanoë	2:54
15.	"Snow on the Sahara" (2012 Version)	Erick Benzi, Nikki Matheson	4:45
Total length:			55:38

Echoes – iTunes Store standard edition
No.	Title	Writer(s)	Length
1.	"Buy Me Happiness"	Anggun, Vincent Baguian, Pilot, Rousseau	3:11
2.	"Only Love"	Anggun, Marie Bastide, Gioacchino Maurici	4:04
3.	"Weapons"	Anggun, Baguian, Pilot, Rosseau	3:09
4.	"Lie to Me"	Anggun, Bastide, Christophe Cottin, Maurici	4:20
5.	"Impossible"	Anggun, Baguian, Pilot, Rosseau	3:11
6.	"Eternal"	Anggun, Bastide, Maurici	3:55
7.	"Rollercoaster"	Anggun, Alain Ekpop, Axel Bauer	4:31
8.	"My Addiction"	Anggun, Baguian, Pilot, Rosseau	2:58
9.	"A Stranger"	Anggun, Bastide, Maurici	3:48
10.	"Cold War"	Anggun, Bastide, Maurici	3:58
11.	"Year of the Snake"	Anggun, Bastide, Maurici	4:40
12.	"Silent Vow"	Anggun, Baguian, Pilot, Rosseau	3:15
13.	"Count on Me"	Anggun, Jean-Luc Raboul, Raphael Alazraki	3:25
14.	"Sorry"	Anggun	3:21
15.	"Let It Be Me"	Gilbert Bécaud, Manny Curtis, Pierre Delanoë	2:54

Echoes – Asian edition
No.	Title	Writer(s)	Length
1.	"Buy Me Happiness"	Anggun, Vincent Baguian, Jean-Pierre Pilot, William Rousseau	3:11
2.	"Hanyalah Cinta"	Anggun, Marie Bastide, Gioacchino Maurici	4:04
3.	"Weapons"	Anggun, Vincent Baguian, Jean-Pierre Pilot, William Rosseau	3:09
4.	"Yang Terlarang"	Anggun, Marie Bastide, Christophe Cottin, Gioacchino Maurici	4:20
5.	"Impossible"	Anggun, Vincent Baguian, Jean-Pierre Pilot, William Rosseau	3:11
6.	"Eternal"	Anggun, Marie Bastide, Gioacchino Maurici	3:55
7.	"Rollercoaster"	Anggun, Alain Ekpop, Axel Bauer	4:31
8.	"My Addiction"	Anggun, Vincent Baguian, Jean-Pierre Pilot, William Rosseau	2:58
9.	"A Stranger"	Anggun, Marie Bastide, Gioacchino Maurici	3:48
10.	"Cold War"	Anggun, Marie Bastide, Gioacchino Maurici	3:58
11.	"Year of the Snake"	Anggun, Marie Bastide, Gioacchino Maurici	4:40
12.	"Silent Vow"	Anggun, Vincent Baguian, Jean-Pierre Pilot, William Rosseau	3:15
13.	"Berkilaulah"	Anggun, Marie Bastide, Gioacchino Maurici	3:56
14.	"Only Love"	Anggun, Marie Bastide, Gioacchino Maurici	4:04
15.	"Count on Me"	Anggun, Jean-Luc Raboul, Raphael Alazraki	3:24
16.	"Sorry"	Anggun	3:20
17.	"Always You" (with Schiller)	Anggun, Christopher von Deylen	4:53

=== French version ===
Échos – Standard edition
No.	Title	Writer(s)	Length
1.	"Je crois en tout"	Vincent Baguian; Jean-Pierre Pilot; William Rousseau	3:16
2.	"Je partirai"	Christophe Cottin; Marie Bastide; Gioacchino Maurici	4:22
3.	"L'Etiquette"	Baguian; Pilot; Rousseau	3:11
4.	"Mon meilleur amour"	Bastide; Maurici	4:06
5.	"Psychomaniaque"	Baguian; Pilot; Rousseau	3:13
6.	"Toi l'éternelle"	Bastide; Maurici	3:58
7.	"Promets-moi le ciel"	Alain Ekpob; Axel Bauer	4:34
8.	"Mon cœur"	Baguian; Pilot; Rousseau	3:01
9.	"Déracinée"	Bastide; Maurici	3:50
10.	"Oser"	Bastide; Maurici	4:00
11.	"L'Année du serpent"	Bastide; Maurici	4:42
12.	"J'ai appris le silence"	Baguian; Pilot; Rousseau; Olivier Schultheis	3:16
Total length:			45:29

Échos – Limited edition (bonus tracks)
No.	Title	Writer(s)	Length
13.	"Buy Me Happiness"	Anggun; Baguian; Pilot; Rousseau	3:11
14.	"Weapons"	Anggun; Baguian; Pilot; Rousseau	3:09
15.	"Impossible"	Anggun; Baguian; Pilot; Rousseau	3:11
16.	"Il" (duet with Gérard Lenorman)	Guy Stornick	3:24

Échos – Special edition
No.	Title	Writer(s)	Length
1.	"Echo (You and I)"	Anggun; Jean-Pierre Pilot; William Rousseau	2:59
2.	"Je crois en tout"	Vincent Baguian; Pilot; Rousseau	3:16
3.	"Je partirai"	Christophe Cottin; Marie Bastide; Gioacchino Maurici	4:22
4.	"L'etiquette"	Baguian; Pilot; Rousseau	3:11
5.	"Mon meilleur amour"	Bastide; Maurici	4:06
6.	"Psychomaniaque"	Baguian; Pilot; Rousseau	3:13
7.	"Toi l'éternelle"	Bastide; Maurici	3:58
8.	"Promets-moi le ciel"	Alain Ekpob; Axel Bauer	4:34
9.	"Mon cœur"	Baguian; Pilot; Rousseau	3:01
10.	"Déracinée"	Bastide; Maurici	3:50
11.	"Oser"	Bastide; Maurici	4:00
12.	"L'année du serpent"	Bastide; Maurici	4:42
13.	"J'ai appris le silence"	Baguian; Pilot; Rousseau; Olivier Schultheis	3:16
14.	"Quelques mots d'amour"	Michel Berger	3:31
15.	"La neige au Sahara" (2012 version)	Erick Benzi	4:45

== Charts ==
=== Weekly charts ===
Chart (2011–2012)	Peak position
Belgian Albums (Ultratop Wallonia)	148
Belgian Heatseekers Albums (Ultratop Wallonia)	7
French Albums (SNEP)	48
French Albums (SNEP) English version	101
French Physical Albums (SNEP)	33
Indonesian Albums (ASIRI)	1

== Certifications ==
Country (Provider)	Certifications
France (Bureau Export)	Gold Export
Indonesia (ASIRI)	4× Platinum

== Release history ==
Region	Date	Label	Edition(s)	Format(s)
Indonesia	20 May 2011	Sony Music Indonesia	Echoes (Asian edition)	CD
Malaysia	19 July 2011	Sony Music Malaysia	Echoes (Asian edition)	CD
Belgium	4 November 2011	Warner Music Benelux	Échos (standard and limited edition)	CD; digital download
France	7 November 2011	Warner Music France	Échos (standard and limited edition)	CD; digital download
Italy	19 December 2011	April Earth	Echoes (iTunes standard edition)	Digital download
France	26 March 2012	Warner Music France	Échos (special edition)	CD; digital download
European Union	30 March 2012	Warner Music International	Echoes (international edition)	CD; digital download
