= Luminescence (album) =

- English version artwork

Studio album by Anggun
- Released: 22 February 2005
- Recorded: 2004–2006
- Genre: Pop, rock
- Length: 50:08 (English version); 57:13 (French version)
- Language: French; English
- Label: Heben Music
- Producer: Jean-Pierre Taïeb, FB Cool, Frédéric Jaffré, Lolly, Niels Brinck, Teetoff

Anggun chronology
Open Hearts (2002)	Luminescence (2005)	Best Of (2006)

Alternative cover
- French version artwork

Singles from Luminescence
- 1. "In Your Mind" Released: 30 January 2005; 2. "Undress Me" Released: 13 May 2005; 3. "Saviour" Released: 10 August 2005; 4. "I'll Be Alright" Released: 16 October 2006; 5. "A Crime" Released: 19 February 2007

Luminescence is the third international studio album by Anggun. The French-language version was released in France on 22 February 2005, while English-language version, also with the same title, was first released in Italy on 18 May 2005. The album was later repackaged in August 2006 as Luminescence: Special Edition with three brand new songs. Following her departure from Columbia Records in 2003, Anggun signed a recording contract with Heben Music. The album features production by several musicians, including Jean-Pierre Taïeb, Frédéric Jaffré and Niels Brinck. Anggun co-wrote music and lyrics of the entire album, except two tracks on the French version.

Luminescence became Anggun's comeback album in France, selling over 121,000 copies there. In Indonesia, the album was certified quadruple platinum for exceeding sales of over 450,000 copies as of 2015. With the album, Anggun expanded her popularity to Eastern Europe. Luminescence was certified gold in Russia, while the album's singles accumulatively received more than 79,000 plays on Russian radio according to TopHit.ru. Luminescence received Platinum Export Award for its sales outside France. The album spawned singles "Être une femme", "Cesse la pluie", "Juste avant toi" and "Garde-moi" (featuring David Hallyday) from the French version, as well as "Undress Me", "In Your Mind", "Saviour", "I'll Be Alright" and "A Crime" from the English version.

== Background and development ==
In 2001, Anggun had already begun working on the follow-up of her second international studio album, Chrysalis (2000). She collaborated with Swedish musician Jörgen Elofsson and Canadian rock singer Bryan Adams, whom she first met while performing at the 2000 Christmas concert in Vatican. One of the songs was "Walking Away" registered to Broadcast Music, Inc. (BMI). However, the writing session for her solo album was shelved, and Anggun started another recording session with Danish producers Niels Brinck and Jesper Winge Leisner for the soundtrack album of Susanne Bier's film Open Hearts (2002). Following the release of the soundtrack album, Anggun announced her departure from Columbia Records due to the company's structural change after its parent label Sony Music Entertainment merger with BMG Music.

In 2004, Anggun signed a record deal with Heben Music, an independent label in France. She restarted the production of her third international studio album with several producers, including Jean-Pierre Taieb and Frederic Jaffre as well as Niels Brinck. Anggun, who composes mainly in English, enlisted the help from several well-known French songwriters, such as Jean Fauque, Lionel Florence, Tété and Evelyn Kral to adapt her English songs into French. Both versions of Luminescence, French and English, shared the same title, a departure from her previous efforts.

== Composition ==
Unlike her previous two studio albums, most of tracks on Luminescence were originally written in English before being adapted to French. Each version of Luminescence has one original track which was not translated to another language—"Go" is only included on the English version, while "Un de toi" is only available on the French version. In 2006, both English and French version of Luminescence were re-released with three additional tracks, "I'll Be Alright" ("Juste avant toi"), "A Crime" ("Garde Moi") and "Waiting" ("Quelqu'un").

The acoustic version of "Human" was used as the soundtrack for the film Le bon, la brute et les zombies (The Good, the Bad, and the Zombies). "Saviour" ("Cesse la pluie") served as the soundtrack for the U.S. box office number-one film Transporter 2.

== Track listing ==
=== English version ===
Luminescence – International standard edition
No.	Title	Writer(s)	Length
1.	"In Your Mind"	Anggun, Jean-Pierre Taïeb	3:28
2.	"Undress Me"	Anggun, Taïeb	3:30
3.	"Evil & Angel"	Anggun, Taïeb	3:47
4.	"Breathe in Water"	Anggun, Jean Fauque, Taïeb	4:42
5.	"Saviour"	Anggun, Evelyne Kral, Frédéric Jaffré	3:44
6.	"Surrender"	Anggun, Taïeb	5:12
7.	"Captivity"	Anggun, Taïeb	4:16
8.	"Cover"	Anggun, Fauque, Alexandre Reitzmann, Taïeb, Patrice Marlone	4:19
9.	"Something Sublime"	Anggun, Taïeb	3:31
10.	"Devil in My Mind"	Anggun, Taïeb	3:15
11.	"Painted"	Anggun, Taïeb	3:15
12.	"Human"	Anggun, Taïeb	3:15
13.	"Go"	Anggun, Taïeb	3:54
Total length:			50:08

Luminescence – Indonesian / Malaysian edition (bonus tracks)
No.	Title	Writer(s)	Length
14.	"Mantra" (Single Version)	Anggun, Kral, Jaffré	3:44
15.	"Mantra" (A Capella Version)	Anggun, Kral, Jaffré	3:30
16.	"Mantra" (Instrumental)	Anggun, Kral, Jaffré	3:44
17.	"In Your Mind" (Indian Remix)	Anggun, Fauque, Taïeb	3:39
18.	"In Your Mind" (FBcool Extended Club Mix)	Anggun, Kral, Jaffré	6:05

Luminescence – Special edition
No.	Title	Writer(s)	Length
1.	"I'll Be Alright"	Anggun, Alice L.B., Cyril Paulus	3:07
2.	"In Your Mind"	Anggun, Taïeb	3:28
3.	"Undress Me"	Anggun, Taïeb	3:30
4.	"Saviour"	Anggun, Kral, Jaffré	3:44
5.	"A Crime"	Anggun, David Hallyday	3:55
6.	"Waiting"	Anggun, SDO, Teetoff	3:25
7.	"Evil & Angel"	Anggun, Taïeb	3:47
8.	"Breathe in Water"	Anggun, Fauque, Taïeb	4:42
9.	"Surrender"	Anggun, Taïeb	5:12
10.	"Captivity" (Guitar Mix)	Anggun, Taïeb	4:16
11.	"Cover"	Anggun, Fauque, Reitzmann, Taïeb, Marlone	4:19
12.	"Something Sublime"	Anggun, Taïeb	3:31
13.	"Devil in My Mind"	Anggun, Taïeb	3:15
14.	"Painted"	Anggun, Taïeb	3:15
15.	"Human"	Anggun, Taïeb	3:15
16.	"Go"	Anggun, Taïeb	3:54
17.	"Mantra"	Anggun, Kral, Jaffré	3:31
18.	"Cesse la pluie"	Kral, Jaffré	3:44
19.	"Être une femme"	Anggun, Kral, Taïeb	3:30
20.	"Saviour" (Teetoff's Dance Radio Edit)	Anggun, Taïeb	3:50
21.	"I'll Be Alright" (Teetoff's Dance Radio Edit)	Anggun, Alice L.B., Paulus	3:05

=== French version ===
Luminescence – French standard edition
No.	Title	Writer(s)	Length
1.	"C'est écrit"	Anggun, Lionel Florence, Jean-Pierre Taïeb	3:30
2.	"Juste être une femme" (featuring Diam's)	Anggun, Evelyne Kral, Taïeb	3:28
3.	"Nous avions des ailes"	Jean Fauque, Taïeb	4:42
4.	"Je suis libre"	Anggun, Florence, Taïeb	3:47
5.	"Cesse la pluie"	Kral, Jaffré	3:44
6.	"L'Improbable Cours des choses"	Anggun, Tété, Taïeb	3:31
7.	"Devil in My Mind"	Anggun, Taïeb	3:15
8.	"D'où l'on vient"	Anggun, Fauque, Alexandre Reitzmann, Fréderic Prévost, Patrice Marlone	4:19
9.	"Captivité"	Anggun, Fauque, Taïeb	4:16
10.	"Human"	Anggun, Taïeb	3:15
11.	"Sur les cendres"	Anggun, Fauque, Taïeb	5:12
12.	"Painted"	Anggun, Taïeb	3:15
13.	"Un de toi"	Anggun, Fauque, Taïeb	3:45
14.	"Captivity" (Acoustic Version)	Anggun, Taïeb	3:44
15.	"Être une femme" (Solo Version)	Anggun, Kral, Taïeb	3:30
Total length:			57:13

Luminescence – French limited edition (bonus DVD)
No.	Title	Length
1.	"Vidéo : A la découverte de Luminescence"	8:45
2.	"Vidéo Clip : Être une femme"	3:20

Luminescence – French special edition
No.	Title	Writer(s)	Length
1.	"Juste avant toi"	Anggun, Kral, Alice L.B., Cyril Paulus	3:07
2.	"C'est écrit"	Anggun, Florence, Taïeb	3:30
3.	"Être une femme" (Indian Vibes Radio Mix)	Anggun, Kral, Taïeb	3:28
4.	"Cesse la pluie"	Kral, Jaffré	3:44
5.	"Garde-moi" (featuring David Hallyday)	Anggun, Kral, Hallyday	3:55
6.	"Nous avions des ailes"	Fauque, Taïeb	4:42
7.	"Je suis libre"	Anggun, Florence, Taïeb	3:47
8.	"L'improbable cours des choses"	Anggun, Tété, Taïeb	3:31
9.	"Quelqu'un"	Anggun, Kral, SDO, Teetoff	3:15
10.	"Devil in My Mind"	Anggun, Taïeb	3:15
11.	"D'où l'on vient"	Anggun, Fauque, Reitzmann, Prévost, Marlone	4:19
12.	"Captivité" (Guitar Mix)	Anggun, Fauque, Taïeb	4:16
13.	"Human"	Anggun, Taïeb	3:15
14.	"Sur les cendres"	Anggun, Fauque, Taïeb	5:12
15.	"Painted"	Anggun, Taïeb	3:15
16.	"Un de toi"	Anggun, Fauque, Taïeb	3:45
17.	"Juste être une femme" (featuring Diam's)	Anggun, Diam's, Kral, Taïeb	3:28
18.	"Saviour" (Teetoff's Dance Radio Edit)	Kral, Jaffré, Teetoff	3:50
19.	"Juste avant toi" (Teetoff's Dance Radio Edit)	Anggun, Kral, Alice L.B., Paulus	3:05

== Charts ==
=== Weekly charts ===
Chart (2005)	Peak position
Belgian Albums (Ultratop Wallonia)	71
French Albums (SNEP)	16
French Back Catalogue (SNEP)	3
Indonesian Albums (ASIRI)	1
Italian Albums (FIMI)	27
Swiss Albums (Schweizer Hitparade)	91

== Certifications ==
Country	Certifications
France (SNEP)	Gold
France (Bureau Export)	Platinum Export
Indonesia (ASIRI)	4× Platinum
Italy (FIMI)	Gold
Russia (NFPF)	Gold

== Release history ==
Region	Date	Label	Edition(s)	Format(s)
France	22 February 2005	Heben Music	Luminescence (French standard edition); Luminescence (French limited edition)	CD, cassette
Italy	18 May 2005	Carosello Records	Luminescence (International standard edition)	CD, cassette
France	21 August 2006	Heben Music	Luminescence (French special edition)	CD, cassette
