= Still Reminds Me =

Single by Anggun

from the album Chrysalis
- Released: 2000
- Genre: R&B, pop
- Length: 3:49
- Label: Columbia; Sony Music
- Songwriters: Erick Benzi; Anggun (Note: English version only)
- Producer: Erick Benzi

Anggun singles chronology
"Life on Mars?" (1998)	"Still Reminds Me" (2000)	"Chrysalis" (2000)

"Still Reminds Me" (titled "Derrière la porte" for the French version) is a song recorded by Indonesian singer Anggun for her second international album, Chrysalis (2000). Originally written in French by its producer Erick Benzi, the song was adapted to English by Anggun herself. "Still Reminds Me" was released as the first single from Chrysalis, while "Derrière la porte" served as the second single from the French version of the album, Désirs contraires.

"Derriere la Porte" was awarded as "Francophone Song of the Year" by Radio France Internationale. "Still Reminds Me" was selected by MTV Asia for their compilation MTV Fantastic Females, Vol. 3.

== Track listing and formats ==
- European 12" vinyl single
1. A1 "Still Reminds Me" (Jason Nevins Extended Club Mix) – 9:37
2. A2 "Still Reminds Me" (Jason Nevins Extended Club Edit) – 4:45
3. A3 "Still Reminds Me" (Special Radio Edit) – 3:35
4. B1 "Still Reminds Me" (Jason Nevins Dub Mix -With Fade-Out-) – 9:18
5. B2 "Snow on the Sahara" (Amen Club Mix) – 7:29
- French CD maxi single
1. "Still Reminds Me" (Special Radio Edit) – 3:25
2. "Still Reminds Me" (Jason Nevins Midtempo Radio Edit) – 3:33
3. "Still Reminds Me" (Jason Nevins Uptempo Radio Remix) – 4:45
4. "Still Reminds Me" (Jason Nevins Club Mix) – 9:37
5. "Still Reminds Me" (Special Radio Edit) – 3:29
- French CD single
1. "Derrière la porte" – 3:50
2. "Still Reminds Me" – 3:58

== Charts ==
Weekly chart performance for "Still Reminds Me"
Chart (2000)	Peak position
Europe (European Border Breakers)	5
French International Airplay (Francodiff)	3
Indonesia (ASIRI)	1
Italy (FIMI)	17
Italian Airplay (FIMI)	3

Annual chart rankings for "Still Reminds Me"
Chart (2000)	Rank
Europe (European Border Breakers)	62
