= Only Love (Anggun song) =

Single by Anggun

from the album Echoes
- Language: French; English; Bahasa Indonesia
- Released: 8 April 2011
- Recorded: 2011
- Genre: Pop
- Length: 4:06
- Label: April Earth
- Songwriters: Anggun; Marie Bastide; Gioacchino Maurici
- Producer: Anggun

Anggun singles chronology
"Crazy" (2008)	"Only Love" (2011)	"Echo (You and I)" (2012)

"Only Love" (English) / "Mon meilleur amour" (French) / "Hanyalah Cinta" (Indonesian) is a song recorded by Indonesian singer Anggun. The song was written by the singer alongside Marie Bastide and Gioacchino Maurici for her sixth international album Echoes. "Only Love" and "Hanyalah Cinta" were released as the album's lead single in Indonesia and Malaysia. Both versions were premiered on 100 Indonesian radio stations on 6 April 2012, making Anggun the only Indonesian act in history to enter the local and international charts simultaneously. "Mon meilleur amour" was originally planned as the lead single for the French album Échos. However "Je partirai" was eventually released as the lead single and "Mon meilleur amour" became the second single instead. The single received Platinum Export Award for selling more than 300.500 copies outside France as of 30 September 2011.

== Track listing and formats ==
- Digital download
1. "Mon meilleur amour" – 4:06
- French CD single
1. "Mon meilleur amour (New Version)" – 3:11
- Indonesian promotional single
1. "Only Love" – 4:06
2. "Hanyalah Cinta" – 4:06

== Charts ==
Chart (2011)	Peak position
Belgium (Ultratip Bubbling Under Wallonia)	37
French International Airplay (Francodiff)	1
French International Downloads (Francodiff)	1
Indonesia (ASIRI)	1
Indonesian Airplay (ASIRI)	1
