= Takut =

Compilation album by Anggun
- Released: 1990
- Recorded: 1990
- Genre: Rock
- Label: Harpa Records, Metrotama
- Producer: Mus Mujiono, Deddy Dhukun

Takut is a 1990 compilation album by Indonesian singer Anggun, released in 1990 under label Harpa Records. It features the hit single "Takut".

== Album information ==
In early 1990s Anggun reached the peak of her fame in Indonesia. Her singles Mimpi and Tua Tua Keladi were hits, making Anggun the most popular female rock musician in her field. Takut was released shortly after Tua Tua Keladi and became another hit. The song, written by Mus Mujiono and Deddy Dhukun, became one of Anggun's most popular in Indonesia.

== Re-released ==
Along with "Mimpi" and "Bayang Bayang Ilusi", "Takut" was also re-released on Anggun's Best Of album for the Indonesian and Malaysian market in 2006. The songs were re-recorded for the new release, with arrangement by Andy Ayunir and orchestra group Saunine.

== Track listing ==
1. "Takut" - Anggun
2. "Kemelut" - Cut Irna
3. "Kemana Ku Berjalan" - Freddy Tamaela
4. "Sempit Dan Sulit" - Lady Avisha
5. "Asa" - Farid Harja
6. "Hampir Lupa" - Deddy Dores
7. "Sinar Kuta" - Yevie Nabela
8. "Kata Kamu" - Dandung Sadewa
9. "Setuju" - Daeng Jamal Purba
10. "Lelyana" - Acid Speed Band
