= Cathy Grier =

American musician

Cathy Grier is an American musician.

== Biography ==
=== Early life ===
Cathy Grier was born in Ogdensburg, New York, where her engineer father helped build the St. Lawrence Bridge. Her family then moved to Connecticut, and her career as a guitar soloist started in 1977 as a senior at Coginchaug High School. In 1979, while working on a music degree at Housatonic Community College in Bridgeport, she formed her own band. A year later, she teamed up with singer-songwriter Lenore Troia after meeting in Paul Leka’s Connecticut Recording Studio, where Cathy was worked to repay the recording of her first demo learning audio engineering in the process. In 1980, Grier enrolled in the Berklee College Summer Program and then began to tour with Troia that fall.

=== Troia/Grier and Students of Life (1980-1987) ===
In 1981, Troia/Grier formed Synergy Records and recorded their first album, titled Don’t Let the First Time be the Last Time, at Studio 19 in Glastonbury, Connecticut. They toured colleges and east coast clubs, opened for larger acts, and were videotaped for Newsweek Broadcasting's syndicated television Show, Today's Woman in April, 1982.

In 1983, Troia/Grier recorded Gut Reaction, their second self-produced album, at Media Sound in New York. The album received a Rising Star feature in the International Rockbill magazine (11/1984). In 1984, the Troia/Grier Band performed in New York City clubs, opened for The Band at The Lone Star Café, and continued to reach larger audiences.

In 1985, after touring the east coast, Troia/Grier were videotaped live for Connecticut's top music video show, Soundtraxx. They then produced their first music video, titled “Breaking New Ground,” which they submitted to MTV as a group named “Students of Life.” The video won MTV’s basement tape competition in October 1986.

Students of Life’s style and sound found their way to Atlantic City. Riding the wave of the MTV generation and bolstered by their MTV basement tape win, critics heralded them as the new breed of casino bands. They first performed at Trump Castle in 1985 and later at Bally’s Casino from 1986-1988. Aware of the pressures and stress of a decade's involvement in the industry, Grier moved to Key West (a frequent touring location for Troia/Grier) to unwind and soon rediscovered her solo career.

=== Key West solo career ===
Finding a need to branch out musically in Key West, Grier took leave from Students of Life. She recorded two live solo tapes, Moonlighting in Key West (1988) and Community (1989) as tributes to her newfound community, and opened for Laura Nyro at Strand Theater (1989). In 1990, she moved back to New York City, where she formed a group and recorded her self-produced album titled New York Sessions.

=== France ===
In the six years that followed, Grier traveled to Europe where she toured 100 cities in a Marlboro Music Night Show and wrote and adapted music and lyrics for several French and European recording artists. In 1991, Indra, a Carrere artist, hit #1 on the French dance charts with a Grier penned album. Then, Grier recorded an album titled Solo (1993), which was released on her own label Shane Music. In 1995, London's Time Out magazine called her music “funkily melodic in a mature and assured style.” Grier returned her focus to New York City in 1996, where she produced and adapted to English an album for EMI artist Nilda Fernandez.

=== Retracing ===
In 1998, Grier released Retracing, a 13-song CD recorded in Key West to positive reviews, which praised her music and message. Time Out New York wrote, “Grier mixes folked-up blues with a political mind-set.” The Hudson Current added, “One aspect that distinguishes her from other performers is her concern with political and environmental issues, layered over that blues/rock melodic base.” The album was mostly recorded live and self-produced with back up from local studio musicians and released on her Shane Music label.

=== Comin' Back to Me ===
In 2002, Grier released Comin' Back to Me, a solo album, to greater exposure and acclaim. She was featured on Mag Rack’s Guitar Xpress, which has also showcased artists including: The Spin Doctors, Trey Anastasio, and Les Paul. Vintage Guitar magazine wrote, “Playing songs with just your acoustic is certainly an art that some of us never master well enough to make a full album…Cathy Grier does not have that problem, whether playing fingerstyle blues, or mixing poppy chords with her strong voice”. In November 2004, she performed at Radio City Music Hall. The only cover song on the CD, Stevie Wonder’s “Love is in Need of Love Today” was chosen as a reaction to the terrorist attacks of September 11, 2001, and meant to express the need for love in tragic times.

=== 2002-present ===
Since her last album, Grier has performed in the Music Under New York program, which is sponsored by the New York Metropolitan Transportation Authority to allow musicians to legally perform in New York City Subway stops. Grier has embraced the program, lauding it for providing free entertainment during a 2004 appearance on ABC's Insomni-Act program. However, on the Feb. 4, 2009, cover of AM New York, she was juxtaposed with the headline “Playin’ ain’t Payin’,” which documents the difficulty of earning money as a street performer in the recession. She responded to the headline with a new alias and blog, NYCsubwaygirl, where she highlights the advantages of the MUNY program. She has performed in Joe’s Pub to a sold out crowd (June 2010). Joe’s Pub listing “local singer-songwriter and activist Cathy Grier plays a mean slide guitar and sings twice as beguilingly as pretty much any American Idol starlet half her age; at her best, she sounds like a bluesier Carole King.” A favorite performer for non-profit organizations Cathy has entertained to benefit Art For Animals, Habitat For Humanity, NY Junior League, to name a few.

As an active supporter of green home building, Grier has also been featured in Natural Home Magazine (Nov/Dec 2006) for her Columbia County, New York, home that implements passive solar design and nontoxic, eco-friendly materials (Dennis Wedlick, architect). An article she wrote about the process of building a healthy home was published in New York House and has been reprinted in various national publications. From 2006 to 2008 she was a member of the zoning commission for her town. She is currently working on her next recording and writing for her blog, NYCsubwaygirl.

== Discography ==
- 1983: Gut Reaction – Synergy Records
- 1986: Breaking New Ground – Synergy Records
- 1988: Moonlighting in Key West – Shane Music
- 1989: Community – Shane Music
- 1990: New York Session – Shane Music
- 1993: Solo – Shane Music
- 1998: Retracing – Shane Music
- 2002: Comin' Back to Me – Shane Music

== Sources ==
- Del Priore, Joe. Hudson Current. May 29-June 4, 1997.
- Fortune, Ross. Time Out London. Apr 12–19, 1995.
- Galtney, Smith. Time Out New York. Aug 7-14, 1997.
- Grier, Cathy. New York House “Building A Healthy Home” December 2006.
- Heidt, John. Vintage Guitar. Mar 2003.
- International Rockbill Magazine. “Rising Stars.” Nov 1984.
- Kallenbach, Laurel. Natural Home Magazine. “Shaker It Up.” Nov/Dec, 2006
- Mag Rack. Guitar Xpress. “Street Licks.” Aug 4, 2004.
- Molinaro, Katie. AM New York. “Playin’ Aint’ Payin.’” Feb 4, 2009
- Time Out NY June 2010
