= Echo (You and I) =

2012 single by Anggun

Single by Anggun

from the album Echoes
- Language: French; English
- Released: 30 January 2012
- Recorded: 2012
- Genre: Dance-pop; EDM
- Length: 3:03
- Label: Warner
- Songwriters: Anggun; William Rousseau; Jean-Pierre Pilot

Anggun singles chronology
"Only Love" (2011)	"Echo (You and I)" (2012)	"Vivre d'amour" (2013)

Audio sample
- You and I: file; help

Music video
- Anggun - Echo (You and I) on YouTube

Eurovision Song Contest 2012 entry
- Country: France
- Artist: Anggun
- Languages: French, English
- Composers: William Rousseau, Jean-Pierre Pilot
- Lyricists: William Rousseau, Anggun

Finals performance
- Final result: 22nd
- Final points: 21

Entry chronology
- ◄ "Sognu" (2011)
- "L'enfer et moi" (2013) ►

"Echo (You and I)" is a song by Indonesian/French singer-songwriter Anggun. A mixed French-English song, it was the French entry in the Eurovision Song Contest 2012. The song was released as the lead single from the international edition of her album Echoes and the third single in France. The full English version of "Echo (You and I)" was later included on her Indonesia-only compilation Best-Of: Design of a Decade 2003–2013 (2013).

== Background ==
On 29 November 2011, Anggun was announced by the France Télévisions as the French representative in the Eurovision Song Contest 2012. Marie Claire Mezzette, the head of the Entertainment Department at France 3, explained that Anggun had been a strong candidate for a long time and last year they were hesitating between her and Amaury Vassili. Speaking about the selection, Anggun said, "It's really a great honour. It's a lovely gift for me as I'm of Indonesian origin, but having been naturalised French since 2000. I undoubtedly symbolise a mixed France of today, made up of many cultures. Your country has given me a beautiful language, a beautiful identity. Secretly, we all want to win. I'm going to shine for France."

== Production ==
Anggun composed the song in collaboration with musicians William Rousseau and Jean-Pierre Pilot. For the mixing of the song she enlisted the help of Veronica Ferraro, who has worked on David Guetta's latest project. On 29 December 2011, the demo of the song, entitled "Europa", was sent to several media and was claimed to be as engaging and inviting as Maroon 5's "Moves Like Jagger" and Britney Spears's "I Wanna Go". On 17 January 2012, Anggun announced the official title of the song, "Echo (You and I)". The song is mostly in French, with few English lyrics in its chorus. The full English version was recorded and included on her compilation Best-Of: Design of a Decade 2003–2013.

== Release and promotion ==
"Echo (You and I)" was previewed exclusively at Midem on 29 January 2012. The single was released on all legal digital platforms on 30 January 2012. An ultra-limited edition cd single of "Echo (You and I) was released on 9 April 2012 in France. For promotional purpose, she recorded several duets of this particular song with various Eurovision finalists from previous seasons such as Niels Brinck, Claudia Faniello, Varga Viktor, and Keo.

Anggun embarked on a promotional tour to more than 15 countries in Europe. She made live appearances to perform the song during the national song selections of several countries, including Malta, Ukraine, Slovenia, Bulgaria, and Greece.

== Music video ==
The music video premiered on 13 March 2012 and was uploaded on Anggun and Eurovision's YouTube channels on the same day. However, the music video was taken down on Eurovision's channel and was re-uploaded again on 20 March 2012 to cut out the beginning of the video which showed various product placements, such as Anggun riding a Dacia Lodgy car with her friends, and talking to a stylist in the studio while numerous hair and beauty products are being used on her.

The video shows Anggun inside a military base where new recruits are seen being trained. The video was shot in Paris and BucharestLodgy to appear in Anggun's video clip "Echo (You and I)" - Groupe Renault.

== Eurovision Song Contest 2012 ==
As one of the "Big Five", the song automatically qualified for the Eurovision grand final. It was drawn to perform 9th. Anggun performed wearing a shiny metallic dress designed by Jean-Paul Gaultier. She was accompanied by two backing vocals and three acrobatic dancers.

The song performed below expectations finishing in 22nd place scoring just 21 points, with nul points from the televoting. Anggun later told the press that she had originally hoped to reach a place within the top 10 and was deeply disappointed with the result.

== Track listing ==
- Digital Download
1. "Echo (You and I)" – 3:03

== Charts ==
Chart (2012)	Peak position
Belgium (Ultratip Bubbling Under Wallonia)	42
France (SNEP)	74
