= Kiss & Love (album) =

Studio album by Sidaction
- Released: 14 November 2014
- Recorded: 2014
- Label: Warner Music France

Singles from Sidaction
- 1. "Kiss & Love" Released: 1 September 2014

Kiss & Love is a 2014 two-CD charity album by various French-language artists in favour of Sidaction, a major French public event that started in 1994 in France for raising awareness and collecting charitable funds for AIDS. It donates important sums to various AIDS charities, HIV/AIDS research, institutions specializing in medical care and social aid for those suffering of HIV/AIDS in France and internationally.

The collective title track "Kiss & Love" became the main single from the album.

== Participants ==
Besides the collective "Kiss & Love", the album contains 20 tracks, sung by 42 artists. 19 tracks are duets, whereas one track ("L'envie d'aimer") is performed by four artists.

== Track listing ==
CD 1:

Track No.	Song title	Original artist	Performers	Length
1	"Seras-tu là"	Michel Berger	Françoise Hardy & Julien Clerc	3:07
2	"Des heures hindoues"	Étienne Daho	Carla Bruni & Calogero	4:12
3	"Fais-moi une place"	Julien Clerc	Maurane & Christophe Willem	4:11
4	"J'en rêve encore"	Gérald de Palmas / Jean-Jacques Goldman	Tina Arena & Garou	4:30
5	"Lucie"	Pascal Obispo	Nolwenn Leroy & Francis Cabrel	4:30
6	"Voilà c'est fini"	Jean-Louis Aubert	Zaho & Yannick Noah	4:25
7	"Un homme heureux"	William Sheller	Florent Pagny & Patrick Bruel	3:30
8	"Qu'est-ce que t'es belle"	Marc Lavoine & Catherine Ringer	Rose & Alain Souchon	3:27
9	"Ça"	Zazie	Claire Keim & Jean-Jacques Goldman	3:39
10	"Mistral gagnant"	Renaud	Zazie & Bénabar	4:02

CD 2:

Track No.	Song title	Original artist	Performers	Length
1	"Parler d'amour"	Art Mengo & Ute Lemper	Lara Fabian & Michel Jonasz	3:41
2	"Foule sentimentale"	Alain Souchon	Zaz & Christophe Maé	4:27
3	"Si seulement je pouvais lui manquer"	Calogero	Joyce Jonathan & Emmanuel Moire	3:41
4	"Ma petite entreprise"	Alain Bashung	Eddy Mitchell & Thomas Dutronc	4:15
5	"Et un jour une femme"	Florent Pagny	Serge Lama & Patrick Fiori	5:21
6	"J'te l'dis quand même"	Patrick Bruel	Natasha St-Pier & Grégoire	3:51
7	"Bleu comme toi"	Etienne Daho	Elsa Fourlon & Laurent Voulzy	3:55
8	"Presque rien"	Francis Cabrel	Elodie Frégé & Raphael	4:14
9	"L'envie d'aimer"	Daniel Lévi / Pascal Obispo & Élie Chouraqui	Hélène Ségara, Liane Foly, Julie Zenatti & Chimène Badi	6:26
10	"Hors saison"	Francis Cabrel	Cali & Pascal Obispo	4:59
11	"Kiss & Love"	Original	The collective (more than 120 artists)	4:45

== Charts ==
=== Weekly charts ===
Chart (2014)	Peak position
Belgian Albums (Ultratop Flanders)	166
Belgian Albums (Ultratop Wallonia)	22
French Albums (SNEP)	5
Swiss Albums (Schweizer Hitparade)	32

=== Year-end charts ===
Chart (2014)	Position
Belgian Albums (Ultratop Wallonia)	181

=== Charting tracks from album ===
Year	Single	Peak positions		
Year	Single	FR	BEL (Wa)	SWI
2014	"Kiss & Love"	47	25* (Ultratip)	—
2014	"Seras-tu là" (Live) Sidaction live (Maxime Le Forestier / Hélène Ségara / Thomas Dutronc / Chimène Badi / Emmanuel Moire / Lââm / Liane Foly / Grégoire / Julien Clerc)	126	—	—
2014	"L'envie d'aimer" Sidaction (Hélène Ségara, Liane Foly, Julie Zenatti & Chimène Badi)	135	—	—
2014	"Ça" Sidaction (Claire Keim & Jean-Jacques Goldman)	147	—	—

*Did not appear in the official Belgian Ultratop 50 charts, but rather in the bubbling under Ultratip charts
