= Kiss & Love =

Single by Various Artists / Sidaction

from the album Kiss & Love
- Released: 1 September 2014
- Recorded: 2014
- Genre: Charity single
- Label: Warner Music France
- Songwriter(s): Lionel Florence (lyrics); Pascal Obispo (music)

"Kiss & Love" is a 2014 charity song and a single with lyrics by Lionel Florence and music by Pascal Obispo. Around 120 artists from France and other French-speaking countries took part in the song and the music videos. All revenues from the sale of the record go into Sidaction, a major French public event that started in 1994 in France for raising awareness and collecting charitable funds for AIDS. It donates important sums to various AIDS charities, HIV/AIDS research, institutions specializing in medical care and social aid for those suffering of HIV/AIDS in France and internationally.

The 2014 Sidaction project was under the direction of Pascal Obispo, being the 20th anniversary of the Sidaction association that was established in 1994.

The title track "Kiss & Love" is the only original song arranged by Brice Davoli with artistic contributions by Alain Souchon, Julien Clerc, Jean-Jacques Goldman, Francis Cabrel et Françoise Hardy and others. The other twenty tracks in the same-titled album are interpreted by various French-language artists in duos, trios etc.

== Artists in the song ==
Here is a listing of the around 120 artists taking part in the single:.

- Alizée
- Amandine Bourgeois
- Amaury Vassili
- Amel Bent
- Anggun
- Anthony Kavanagh
- Arnaud Ducret
- Arthur
- Ary Abittan
- Baptiste Giabiconi
- Brice Conrad
- Camille Lou
- Christophe Dechavanne
- Claudia Tagbo
- Collectif Métissé
- Corson
- Cyril Hanouna
- Damien Sargue
- David Carreira
- Djénéva
- Dumè
- Élie Semoun
- Élisa Tovati
- Féfé
- Florence Foresti
- Florent Mothe
- Florent Peyre
- Franck Dubosc
- Frédéric Lerner
- Frédéric Lopez
- Gad Elmaleh
- Helmut Fritz
- Jean-Luc Reichmann
- Jeff Panacloc
- Judith
- Keen'V
- Kenza Farah
- Kev Adams
- La Fouine
- Laurent Ruquier
- Leslie
- Louis Delort
- Louisy Joseph
- Maître Gims
- M. Pokora
- Matt Houston
- Mutine (Duo Manon & Silvio)
- Mathieu Madénian
- Maude
- Merwan Rim
- Michaël Gregorio
- Michaël Youn
- Mickaël Miro
- Mikelangelo Loconte
- Mimie Mathy
- Muriel Robin
- Nazim
- Nicolas Canteloup
- Nikos Aliagas
- Nolwenn Leroy
- Olympe
- Pascal Obispo
- Patrick Bosso
- Pauline
- Roberto Bellarosa
- Romain Ughetto
- Sébastien Cauet
- Sexion d'Assaut
- Shy'm
- Sofia Essaïdi
- Sonia Lacen
- Stanislas
- Stéphane Bern
- Tal
- Thierry Amiel
- Titoff
- Tony Saint Laurent
- Vincent Niclo
- Vitaa
- Ycare
- Yoann Fréget

== Charts ==
Chart (2011–12)	Peak position
Belgium (Ultratip Bubbling Under Wallonia)	25
France (SNEP)	47
