= Mimpi =

Compilation album by Anggun and various artists
- Released: 1989
- Recorded: 1989
- Genre: Hard rock, power ballad
- Label: Atlantic Records, Ariola
- Producer: Teddy Sudjaja, Pamungkas NM

Mimpi (meaning Dream) is a compilation album by Indonesian singer Anggun, featuring the two hit singles "Mimpi" and "Bayang Bayang Ilusi". The album was released in 1989 under label Atlantic Records Indonesia. The song "Mimpi" eventually got placed at number 47 on Rolling Stone Indonesia's "The 150 Greatest Indonesian Songs of All Time" list. Mimpi has sold approximately 1 million copies in Indonesia.

== Album information ==
The album is not a solo album of Anggun, but a compilation album of Indonesian rockers such as Gito Rollies, Deddy Stanzah, and Euis Darliah. Two of Anggun's songs appear on the album: "Mimpi" and "Bayang Bayang Ilusi". Both singles were written by Teddy Sudjaja and Pamungkas NM. The first single, "Mimpi" became a big hit in Indonesia at the time and was followed by the second single, "Bayang Bayang Ilusi". Due to the success of the album, Anggun also became known as a "single/compilation singer", that often released an album with a mere one or two singles on it.

== Re-released ==
Sixteen years after the release of "Mimpi" and "Bayang Bayang Ilusi", Anggun re-released the songs along with Takut on her Best Of album in 2006 under Sony BMG in Indonesia and Malaysia. The songs were re-recorded in the new version with arrangement by Andy Ayunir and orchestra group Saunine. "Mimpi" was chosen again as its lead single off the album and became a hit again for the second time.

== Track listing ==
1. "Mimpi" - Anggun
2. "Bayang Bayang Ilusi" - Anggun
3. "Siapa Aku" - Deddy Stanzah
4. "Suara Hati" - Gito Rollies
5. "Tatap Dunia" - Deddy Dores
6. "Api Telah Padam" - Gito Rollies
7. "Aku Melangkah" - Andry Kasman
8. "Citraku" - Euis Darliah
9. "Sungguh Bosan" - Andry Kasman
10. "Negosiasi" - Deddy Stanzah
