= Crazy (Anggun song) =

"Si Tu L'avoues"

Single by Anggun

from the album Elevation
- Released: June 30, 2008 (digital download)
- Recorded: 2008
- Genre: Pop, dance, urban
- Length: 4:21 (Album version); 3:59 (Single/Radio version)
- Label: Heben Music
- Songwriter(s): Anggun; Julie Grignon; Wealstarr
- Producer(s): Tefa & Masta

Anggun singles chronology
"A Crime" (2007)	"Si Tu L'avoues" (2008)	"Only Love" (2011)

Alternative cover
- Remixes single cover

"Si Tu L'avoues" (English: "If You Admit It") is the first French single from her fourth French album, Elevation by Anggun. There's also an English version of the song, "Crazy", for the international edition and "Jadi Milikmu" for Indonesian and Malaysian edition. "Jadi Milikmu" received heavy airplay in Indonesia, causing the song to top the Indonesian Airplay Chart. It has been certified Platinum Export Award for selling more than 250.000 copies outside France.

== Track listing ==
Digital Download
(Released: June 30, 2008)

1. "Si tu L'avoues" — 3:59

CD Single
(Released: June 30, 2008)

1. "Si tu L'avoues" — 4:00

Digital Remixes
(Released: August 11, 2008)

1. "Si Tu L'avoues" (Laurent Wolf Club Mix) — 5:47
2. "Si Tu L'avoues" (Tomer G & Roi Tochner Club Mix) — 8:27
3. "Si Tu L'avoues" (Laurent Wolf Radio Edit) — 3:17
4. "Si Tu L'avoues" (Tomer G & Roi Tochner Radio Edit) — 4:13
5. "Si Tu L'avoues" (Radio Edit) — 3:59
6. "Crazy" (Laurent Wolf Club Mix) — 5:47
7. "Crazy" (Tomer G & Roi Tochner Club Mix) — 8:29
8. "Crazy" (Tomer G & Roi Tochner Radio Edit) — 4:13
9. "Crazy" (Radio Edit) — 3:57

== Chart ==
Chart (2008/2009)	Peak position
French International Airplay (Francodiff)	6
Indonesia (ASIRI)	1
Russia (Radio TopHit Airplay)	97
