= I'll Be Alright (Anggun song) =

Single by Anggun

from the album Luminescence
- Released: 1 June 2006
- Recorded: 2005
- Genre: Pop
- Length: 3:10
- Label: Heben Music
- Songwriters: Anggun, Evelyne Kral, Alice L.B., Cyril Paulus
- Producers: FB Cool, SDO

Anggun singles chronology
"Saviour" (2005)	"I'll Be Alright" (2006)	"A Crime" (2007)

"I'll Be Alright" (French: "Juste avant toi") is a song recorded by Indonesian-born French singer Anggun for the special edition of her third international studio album Luminescence. It was written by the singer alongside Evelyne Kral, Alice L.B., and Cyril Paulus, and was produced by FB Cool and SDO. "I'll Be Alright" was released as the fourth single from the album for international market, while "Juste avant toi" was released as the third single in France and French-speaking countries.

== Track listing ==
CD single

1. Juste avant toi

Ultra edition

1. Juste Avant Toi - Album/Single Version
2. Juste Avant Toi - Teetof Dance Radio Edit
3. I'll Be Alright
4. Cesse la Pluie - FB Cool's Lounge Remix
5. Juste Avant Toi - Video Track

Remixes

1. Juste Avant Toi (Teetoff's Dance Ext. Remix)
2. Juste Avant Toi (Da Gunners Ragga Remix)
3. Juste Avant Toi (Teetoff's Dance Radio Edit)
4. Juste Avant Toi (Da Gunners Ragga Radio Edit)
5. Juste Avant Toi (Original Mix)

== Music video ==
The music video was shot by Jean-Baptiste Erreca in Jakarta and Bali, during Anggun's biggest concert in Jakarta, Konser Untuk Negeri (Concert for the Country).

== Chart performance ==
"I'll Be Alright/Juste Avant Toi" is the third single from Luminescence which managed to enter the European Hot 100 Singles, peaking at number 91. The French version was Anggun's fourth Top 40 in France, peaking at number 28 on French Singles Chart and stayed on the chart 18 weeks and has sold over 17.000 copies. The English version is one of the most famous Anggun's songs in Eastern Europe and has been played more than 43,000 times on Russian radio stations.

== Charts ==
Chart (2006)	Peak position
CIS (Radio TopHit Airplay)	46
European Hot 100 Singles (Billboard)	91
France (SNEP)	28
French International Airplay (Francodiff)	4
