= Sidaction =

Annual French AIDS awareness charity event

Sidaction is a major French public event that started in 1994 in France for raising awareness and collecting charitable funds for AIDS. It donates important sums to various AIDS charities, HIV/AIDS research, institutions specializing in medical care and social aid for those suffering of HIV/AIDS in France and internationally. In 2007, for example, Sidaction allocated donations to 111 programs in 29 countries. Sidaction was presided by Pierre Bergé and its vice-president is Line Renaud. After Bergé's death in September 2017, Françoise Barré-Sinoussi was assigned as new president.

== Fundraising ==
Sidaction has launched various initiatives in order to raise funds for its projects. It also has an on-line shop selling items including clothing which contains advertising, drawing attention to the charity. In 2008 the French underwear manufacturer Hom, which is part of the Triumph International brand, launched a special edition of men's maxi brief which incorporated a condom pocket, supplied complete with condom, and included a waistband with the words 'Safe love' with the red ribbon symbol on one leg. For each brief sold, the manufacturer donated €1 to the charity.

== Sidaction in popular media ==
In the winter of 1998, a charity album entitled Sidaction by "Ensemble 98" became a top selling album and was top of the French Album Charts for 2 weeks in the November 28 and December 5, 2010 charts.

In 1999, all revenue from the controversial French hit "Je te rends ton amour" sung by Mylène Farmer were donated to Sidaction.

In 2004, Sidaction released "Y'a pas un homme qui soit né pour ça" credited to "Sidaction (Florent Pagny / Calogero / Pascal Obispo), a singer". The single made it to number 20 on SNEP, the official French Singles Chart.

In 2014, Sidaction released a new charity song entitled "Kiss & Love" followed by a similar titled album that reached number 5 in France in its first week of release.

In 2018, Sidaction released a new charity song "Sa raison d'être 2018" with the participation of a great number of artists. This coincided with the 20th anniversary of Pascal Obispo's charity album Ensemble and that album's first track "Sa raison d'être", this 2018 take being a remake of the original. Tha artists include Florent Pagny, Patrick Bruel, Zazie, Marc Lavoine, Carla Bruni, Jenifer, Shy'm, Keen V. Pascal Obispo also invited younger artists like Slimane, Vianney, Zaz, Amir, Tal, the Brigitte duo, Christophe Maé, Vincent Niclo, Elodie Frégé, Emmanuel Moire, Michaël Gregorio, Lisandro Cuxi, Christophe Willem, Kids United etc. The music video is introduced by Pascal Obispo and Line Renaud.
