= William Rousseau =

French singer and composer

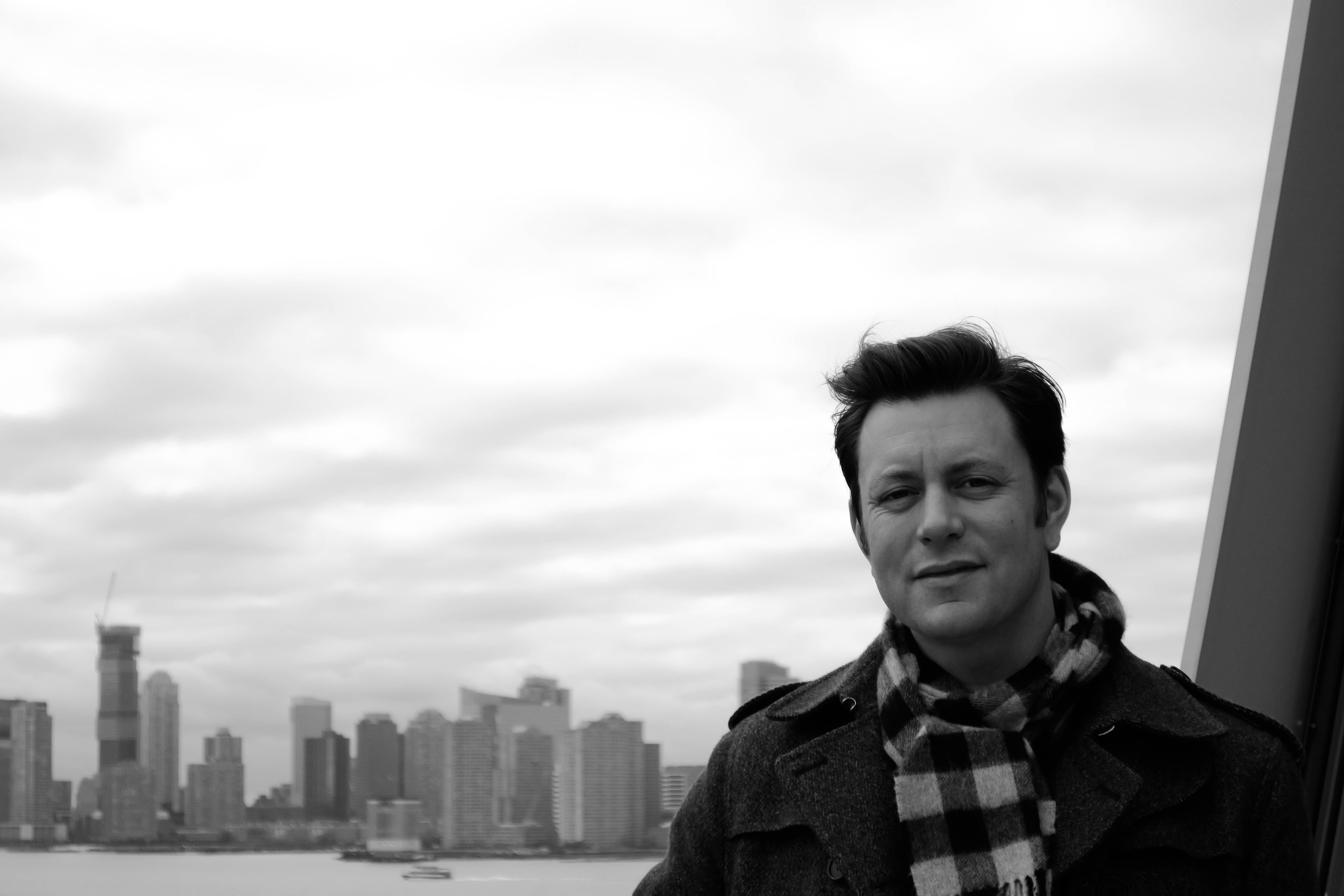

Background information
- Born: 13 September 1977 (age 48)
- Origin: France
- Genres: French pop; chanson
- Occupations: Singer; composer

William Rousseau is a French singer and composer.

== Biography ==
William Rousseau moved to Paris in 2002 and signed as a composer for Warner. He wrote songs for Celine Dion, Tina Arena, Nolwenn Leroy, Roch Voisine, Anggun, Chimène Badi, and Christophe Willem amongst others.

In 2005, along with Dove Attia and friend Rod Janois, he contributed two songs for the musical Le Roi Soleil. His next project is with the team of composers for Mozart, l'opéra rock (2009), 1789 : Les Amants de la Bastille (2012); Mistinguett, reine des années folles (2014) and Le Rouge et Le Noir (2016).

In 2009, he released his first solo album: Ton homme en passant, with Jérôme Attal's lyrics.

In 2012, with Jean-Pierre Pilot, he wrote Echo (You and I) for Anggun, the French candidate at the Eurovision Song Contest. He also produced Always with Jean-Pierre Pilot, and Elles & Lui for Alain Chamfort with Olivier Schultheis .

== Discography ==
=== Album ===
- 2009 : Ton homme en passant

=== Singles ===
- 2008 : Comme un soviet
- 2009 : La fête des loges

=== Contributions ===
- 2004 : A tes côtés, Se laisser quelque chose, Maintenant - David Charvet
- 2005 : Mystères - Nolwenn Leroy
- 2005 : Tant qu'on rêve encore, Contre ceux d'en-haut for Le Roi Soleil
- 2005 : Ne plus aimer - Roch Voisine
- 2006 : Le miroir - Chimène Badi
- 2006 : Je suis - Florent Pagny
- 2006 : Rien ni personne, Plus que jamais - Emmanuel Moire
- 2009 : Berlin - Christophe Willem
- 2009 : Tatoue-moi, L'assasymphonie and other songs Mozart, l'opéra rock
- 2010 : C'est le soir que je pense à ma vie - Florent Pagny
- 2010 : Dans un vertige de Marie-Amélie Seigner
- 2011 : Cool - Christophe Willem
- 2011 : Je crois en tout, Je partirai, Mon meilleur amour, Mon coeur, J'ai appris le silence - Anggun
- 2011 : Il marche - Amel Bent
- 2012 : Pour la peine and other songs for 1789 : Les Amants de la Bastille
- 2012 : Les jours comme ça - Céline Dion
- 2012 : Echo (You and I) - Anggun
- 2012 : Elles & Lui - Alain Chamfort
- 2013 : Louise - Benjamin Bohem
- 2013 : C'est la vie - Lussi in the sky and his Nebula
- 2014 : C'est mon homme and other songs for Mistinguett, reine des années folles
- 2016 : Le Rouge et le Noir
- 2017 : Trace ton chemin - Nolwenn Leroy
- 2018 : Ok ou Ko - Emmy Liyana
- 2018 : My World - Lucie Vagenheim
- 2019 : T'aimer de trop - Amel Bent

== Awards ==
- NRJ Music Award 2010 : French song of the year for L'Assasymphonie
