= Chrysalis (Anggun album) =

- English version artwork

Studio album by Anggun
- Released: 30 August 2000
- Recorded: 1999–2000
- Genre: Pop; electronic; R&B
- Length: 53:27 (English version); 52:01 (French version)
- Language: French; English
- Label: Columbia; Sony
- Producer: Erick Benzi

Anggun chronology
Snow on the Sahara (1997)	Chrysalis (2000)	Open Hearts (2002)

Désirs contraires
- French version artwork

Singles from Chrysalis
- 1. "Un geste d'amour" Released: 1 May 2000; 2. "Still Reminds Me" Released: 30 August 2000; 3. "Chrysalis" Released: 20 December 2000

Chrysalis (English version) / Désirs contraires (French version) is the second international studio album by Indonesian French singer Anggun. It was released by Columbia Records and Sony Music Entertainment in over fifteen countries in Europe and Asia, with the English version being first released in Japan on 30 August 2000 and the French version premiering in France on 2 October 2000. A major departure from her non-Indonesian debut album's world music composition, Chrysalis features electropop sounds with elements of R&B and ambient music. The album was again produced by Erick Benzi and featured some of Anggun's own compositions. She also co-wrote the entire material on the English version.

Chrysalis debuted at number 66 on Billboard's European Top 100 Albums chart. It became Anggun's second top-ten album in Italy and was certified Gold one week after its release. In Indonesia, Chrysalis received quadruple Platinum certification. Désirs contraires peaked at number 48 on the French Albums Chart and has sold about 30,000 copies in France. The album received Platinum Export for its commercial success outside France. Singles released were "Still Reminds Me" and "Chrysalis" from Chrysalis, and "Un geste d'amour" and "Derrière la porte" from Désirs contraires. To promote the record, Anggun embarked on a tour across Asia and Europe, including her first concert at the Bataclan in Paris, on 1 February 2001.

The track "Tu nages" was covered by Celine Dion on her 2003 French album, 1 fille & 4 types, which was also produced by Erick Benzi.

== Reception ==
Chrysalis debuted at number 66 on the European Top 100 Albums, chart compiled by Music & Media and Billboard, based on sales across the continent. It became Anggun's second top-ten album on the official albums chart by Federazione Industria Musicale Italiana and was certified Gold in Italy one week after its release. It also became Anggun's best-selling international album in Indonesia to date, with four Platinum certifications. Critically, the album received a positive response from music critics. Brittany Jerlinga, in a review for Pulse! magazine, called Chrysalis "brilliant" and wrote that its songs are "soulful, strong and heart-felt."

== Track listing ==
=== English version ===
All tracks are written by Anggun and Erick Benzi, except where noted.

Chrysalis – International standard edition
No.	Title	Writer(s)	Length
1.	"Still Reminds Me"		3:50
2.	"Rain"	Anggun, Cathy Grier, Benzi	3:46
3.	"Breathing"		3:48
4.	"Chrysalis"		3:43
5.	"Tears of Sorrow"	Anggun, Grier, Benzi	4:16
6.	"Want You to Want Me"		3:15
7.	"How the World..."		3:52
8.	"A Prayer"		3:47
9.	"Non Angelical"	Anggun, Grier, Benzi	3:53
10.	"Look into Yourself"		4:06
11.	"Forbidden Love"		4:14
12.	"Signs of Destiny"		3:57
13.	"Comme un privilege"	Anggun, Benzi, Nicolas Mingot	3:45
14.	"Broken Dream"		3:15
Total length:			53:27

Chrysalis – Indonesian / Malaysian edition (bonus tracks)
No.	Title	Length
15.	"Yang Aku Tunggu"

Chrysalis – Japanese edition (bonus tracks)
No.	Title	Length
15.	"Marcher sur la mer"

Chrysalis – Scandinavian special edition (bonus tracks)
No.	Title	Writer(s)	Length
15.	"Rain (Here Without You)" (duet with Jonas Winge Leisner)	Anggun, Jonas Winge Leisner
16.	"Ocean Love"
17.	"Still Reminds Me" (Jason Nevins Video Mix)
18.	"Chrysalis" (Hex Hector Pop Mix)
19.	"The Making of Chrysalis" (Video of Anggun recording the songs on Chrysalis)

Chrysalis – Singaporean special edition (bonus tracks)
No.	Title	Writer(s)	Length
15.	"Still Reminds Me" (Jason Nevins Mid Tempo Radio Edit)
16.	"Chrysalis" (Hex Hector Pop Radio Edit)
17.	"Snow on the Sahara" (Live Unplugged Version)	Benzi, Nikki Matheson

=== French version ===
Désirs contraires – French standard edition
No.	Title	Writer(s)	Length
1.	"Derrière la porte"	Benzi	3:51
2.	"Les champs de peine"		3:44
3.	"Un geste d'amour"	Benzi	4:06
4.	"Un monde à l'endroit"		4:14
5.	"Chaque jour sans fièvre"	Benzi	3:48
6.	"Une femme"		3:54
7.	"Tu nages"	Benzi	3:01
8.	"Mes désirs contraires"		3:44
9.	"Marcher sur la mer"		3:49
10.	"Tu mens"		3:43
11.	"Brume"	Benzi	3:09
12.	"Tout peut arriver"		3:57
13.	"Mon privilège"	Benzi, Mingot	3:44
14.	"Broken Dream"		3:17
Total length:			52:01

== Charts ==
=== Weekly charts ===
Chart (2000)	Peak position
European Top 100 Albums (Billboard)	66
French Albums (SNEP)	48
Indonesian Albums (ASIRI)	1
Italian Albums (FIMI)	10
Swiss Albums (Schweizer Hitparade)	60

== Certifications ==
Country	Certifications
France (Bureau Export)	Platinum Export
Indonesia (ASIRI)	4× Platinum
Italy (FIMI)	Gold

== Release history ==
Region	Date	Label	Edition(s)	Format(s)
Japan	30 August 2000	Epic Japan	Chrysalis (Japanese edition)	CD, cassette
Taiwan	1 September 2000	Sony Music Taiwan	Chrysalis	CD, cassette
Italy	7 September 2000	Sony Music Italy	Chrysalis	CD, cassette
France	2 October 2000	Columbia Records	Désirs contraires	CD, cassette
Germany	30 October 2000	Sony Music Germany	Chrysalis	CD, cassette
Indonesia	6 April 2002	Sony Music Indonesia	Désirs contraires	CD, cassette
