= Saviour (Anggun song) =

Single by Anggun

from the album Luminescence and Transporter 2: Original Motion Picture Soundtrack
- Released: 10 August 2005
- Recorded: 2004
- Genre: Pop rock
- Length: 3:40
- Label: Heben Music (Sony BMG)
- Songwriters: Anggun, Evelyne Kral, Frédéric Jaffré,

Anggun singles chronology
"In Your Mind" (2005)	"Saviour" (2005)	"I'll Be Alright" (2006)

"Saviour" (English) / "Cesse la pluie" (French) / "Mantra" (Indonesian) is a song recorded by Indonesian singer Anggun. Written originally in French by Evelyne Kral and Frédéric Jaffré, the song was adapted to English and Indonesian by Anggun. Released as the second single from Anggun's third international album, Luminescence (2005), it was also used as the soundtrack of the U.S. box office number-one film Transporter 2. The song remains one of Anggun's most popular single internationally.

== Reception ==
The song received positive reception from music critics. While reviewing the soundtrack of Transporter 2, James Christopher Monger from Allmusic called the song as a "sensual" track from "Indonesian pop goddess" and picked it as the highlight of the album. Spence D. from IGN commented that in the song "Anggun shoot for stripped down piano and backmasked shuffles that lead into a decidedly European synth pop excursion." In a review for Luminescence, Rohin from Blogcritics wrote the song as one of the album's "catchy tracks sure to raise eyebrows".

The song remains one of Anggun's most popular singles internationally. Despite not charting as high as its predecessor, "Être une femme", the song spent more weeks on French Singles Chart, 23 weeks on the Top 100. "Cesse la pluie" peaked at number 22 on the chart and became her best-selling single in France since "La neige au Sahara", selling over 65,000 copies. It became her second consecutive single from Luminescence to chart on the European Hot 100 Singles, peaking at number 76.

== Music video ==
Cesse la pluie video was directed by Jean-Baptiste Erreca in Spain. The video was shot in two versions—normal and movie tie-in—with gold-coloured filter was used to achieve the tinted effect. For movie tie-in version, scenes taken from Transporter 2 movie trailer were added in between. The wardrobe was provided by Italian designer Roberto Cavalli with the green camo-print caftan with side cutouts and elongated sleeves was culled from Cavalli's spring/summer 2005 ready-to-wear collection just months before it hit the stores. The designer also created a special two-piece bathing suit featuring extensively beaded gold lurex top with plunging neckline and matching hot pants.

The treatment starts with water being released down the aqueduct, followed by closeup shots of Anggun focusing on her eyes and mouth. The singer then stood near the underground stream singing while the water drips on her. The scene is later followed by Anggun singing with the aid of her band. The following shot sees Anggun in Roberto Cavalli camo-print caftan swinging the elongated sleeves against the incoming wind. The band-aided singing scene repeated until the next, where she, dressed in an embellished black tulle ballgown, plays with fire lit from the tips of her silver finger caps. As the video enters its second half ending frame, the shots were mixed with Anggun and her band performing in the rain. The video ends with a pan shot of Anggun catwalking while extending her elongated sleeves, and fades out.

Due to the overt wardrobe and her sexy moves, the music video of "Saviour" was banned by the censors in Indonesia. However, the video managed to receive satisfactory rotation amount in Malaysia and other Asian countries via MTV Asia. The video was finally shown to the public during her major concert in Jakarta several years back.

== Track listing ==
- Europe CD Single
1. "Saviour" – 3:40
2. "Saviour" (Teetoff's Dance Edit) – 3:50
- France CD Maxi Single
1. "Cesse la pluie" (Album Version) – 3:40
2. "Cesse la pluie" (Teetoff's Dance Radio Edit) – 3:50
3. "Saviour" (Version Anglaise de "Cesse la pluie") – 3:40
4. "Être une femme" (Indian Vibes Radio Edit) – 3:40
5. "Cesse la pluie" (Video Clip) – 3:40

== Charts ==
=== Weekly charts ===
Weekly chart performance for "Saviour"
Chart (2005–2006)	Peak position
Belgium (Ultratip Bubbling Under Wallonia)	10
CIS Airplay (TopHit)	138
European Hot 100 Singles (Billboard)	76
France (SNEP)	22
Greece (IFPI)	41
Italy (FIMI)	35
Netherlands (Single Top 100)	94
Russia Airplay (TopHit)	38
Switzerland (Schweizer Hitparade)	65

=== Year-end charts ===
Year-end chart performance for "Saviour"
Chart (2006)	Position
Russia Airplay (TopHit)	66
