= In Your Mind (song) =

Single by Anggun

from the album Luminescence
- Language: French; English
- Released: 1 February 2005
- Recorded: 2004
- Genre: Pop, R&B
- Length: 3:22
- Label: Heben Music
- Songwriters: Anggun; Jean Pierre Taïeb; Evelyne Kral (Note: French version only)
- Producer: FBcool

Anggun singles chronology
"La mer est sans fin" (2004)	"In Your Mind" (2005)	"Undress Me" (2005)

"In Your Mind" (2005) (titled "Être une femme" for the French version) is a song recorded by Indonesian singer Anggun for her third international album, Luminescence (2005). This single was released in late 2004, earlier than the album which was released in 2005. This single peaked at #16 at France Singles Top 100, making her second Top 20 hits in France. According to Bureau Export (French-music.org) the song peaked at #2 in 2005 Airplay Chart and became one of the biggest hits in 2005. This single was also chosen as "The most popular single 2004" by Radio France International and has sold around 55,000 copies there. The English version of the song, "In Your Mind", was popular in Asia as well and has since remained as one of Anggun's famous songs.

== Song information ==
"Être une femme" was composed by Jean Pierre Taïeb in 2004. The song relies heavily on Arabic music, with R&B influence. The French version of the song has a guest rap from Diam's titled "Juste Être une femme" and a solo version. The song Ye Ishq Hai, from the Indian movie, Jab We Met uses a similar tune to Anggun's song. Also, beats of both song are similar to a 1994 song "Roop Suhana Lagta Hai", whose music has been given by A.R. Rahman. The song was for female-empowerment as a man is intimidated by a woman's looks and intelligence.

== Track listing ==
CD Single

1. "Être une femme" (Solo Version)
2. "Être une femme" (Fbcool Extended Club Mix)
3. "Voir l'envers" (Générique de Flat Mania)

Remixes CD Single

1. "Être Une Femme" (Solo Version) — 3:23
2. "Être Une Femme" (FbCool Extended Club Mix) — 6:08
3. "Être Une Femme" (FbCool Extended Dub Mix) — 5:49
4. "Être Une Femme" (Instrumental Version) — 3:22
5. "Être Une Femme" (A Capella Mix)— 3:20

== Chart performance ==
The song debuted on France Singles Top 100 at number 23, on issue date of February 5, 2005. Weeks later, the song descended to number 26 and then 28, before the song reached a new peak position at 17. The song reached number 16 in its sixth week on the chart (issue date: March 12, 2005), making Anggun's highest charting French single since "La neige au Sahara" debut in 1997. "Être une femme" stayed on Top 40 for 12 weeks and on Top 100 for 17 weeks.

The song also debuted in Switzerland, debuted at number 73 on February 13, 2005, and reached its peak position at number 58 in its fourth week. "Être une femme" stayed on the Top 100 for 13 weeks.

== Charts ==
Chart (2005)	Peak position
Belgium (Ultratop 50 Wallonia)	36
Bulgaria (IFPI)	13
European Hot 100 Singles (Billboard)	57
France (SNEP)	16
Indonesia (ASIRI)	1
Russia (Radio TopHit Airplay) featuring Diam's	139
Switzerland (Schweizer Hitparade)	58
