= Francophonie Diffusion =

French music platform

- Industry: Music
- Founded: February 1993
- Headquarters: France
- Website: www.francodiff.org

Francophonie Diffusion is a music platform for international media promotion of French and Francophone music established in February 1993. The association is supported by French Ministry of Foreign Affairs, French Ministry of Culture and Communication and Société des auteurs, compositeurs et éditeurs de musique (SACEM). Francophonie Diffusion have network affiliates of more than 1000 media (including almost 800 radio stations), festivals and music supervisors worldwide located in 100 countries, provinces or territories. It specialized in the export of the French labels releases and promotes French artists around the world. Francophonie Diffusion also published a monthly and yearly record chart of the most-played French singles across the world.
