= Le bruit et l'odeur =

1991 speech by Jacques Chirac

"Le bruit et l'odeur" (French pronunciation: [ləbʁɥi e lɔˈdœʁ]) refers to a speech given in 1991 by Jacques Chirac, the mayor of Paris, who later became French president; it translates as "the noise and the smell."

== The speech ==
This is an excerpt from the speech:

Comment voulez-vous que le travailleur français qui travaille avec sa femme et qui ensemble gagnent environ 15 000 FF et qui voit sur le palier à côté de son HLM, entassée, une famille avec un père de famille, trois ou quatre épouses et une vingtaine de gosses et qui gagne 50 000FF de prestations sociales sans naturellement travailler... Si vous ajoutez à cela le bruit et l'odeur, eh bien le travailleur français sur le palier, il devient fou. Et ce n'est pas être raciste que de dire cela. Nous n'avons plus les moyens d'honorer le regroupement familial et il faut enfin ouvrir le débat qui s'impose dans notre pays qui est un vrai débat moral pour savoir si il est naturel que les étrangers puissent bénéficier au même titre que les Français d'une solidarité nationale à laquelle ils ne participent pas puisqu'ils ne payent pas d'impôts.

English translation: How do you want a French worker who works with his wife, who earn together about 15,000 FF [equivalent to €4,000 in 2025] and who sees next to his public housing, a piled-up family with a father, three or four spouses and twenty kids earning 50,000 FF [equivalent to €13,200 in 2025] via benefits, naturally without working... If you add to that the noise and the smell, well the French worker, he goes crazy. And it is not being racist to say this. We no longer have the means of honouring the family regrouping [policy], and we need to finally start the essential debate in this country, as to whether it is moral and normal that foreigners should profit to the same extent as French people, from a national solidarity to which they don't participate, as they pay no taxes.

In this speech, Chirac contrasts the situation of older generations of immigrants (coming from Italy, Spain, Portugal or Poland) to what he considers the current "overdose" of immigration, mostly from Muslim Arabs and Blacks coming from former colonies that once wanted and got their independence from France. He deplores polygamy, family regrouping policy (adopted by his own initiative) in 1976, exaggerated social assistance (assistanat) and also the situation of the working-class French, who have trouble making ends meet and see large immigrant families next door living the African way of life in Europe, with one man, three or four spouses, and dozens of children, all living off welfare, not working, not contributing to social taxes, and making noises and smells in their council houses. (At the time, France recognized polygamous marriages that had been performed abroad.)

He then explains that in such conditions, the French worker, without being a racist, is bound to become mad.

This speech became famous when it was sampled in 1995 by the French band Zebda on their hit "Le bruit et l'odeur" from the album of the same name. Three of the seven members of the group Zebda are ethnically Maghrebis, while the rest are ethnically European.

== See also ==
- Polygamy in France
- "Money and the ethnic vote"
- Rivers of Blood speech
- Welfare queen
- Welfare reform

== External references ==
- (in French) Part of Chirac's speech and other quotations
