= Second Tour =

Second Tour may refer to:

- Second Tour (1940 film), a Czech drama film
- Second Tour (2023 film), a French comedy film
- Second Tour (album), a 2012 album by Zebda
