= Second Tour (album) =

Second tour

Studio album by Zebda
- Released: 2012
- Genre: Rock

Zebda chronology
Utopie d'Occase (2002)	Second tour (2012)	Comme des Cherokees (2014)

Second tour is the fifth album by politically active French pop group Zebda. It is the group's 5th album, and the title (literally "second round") is a reference to the reformation of the group after a hiatus 2003-2011.

== Track listing ==
1. "Les Deux Écoles" – 3'59"
2. "Le Dimanche autour de l'église" – 4'06"
3. "Un je ne sais quoi" – 3'22"
4. "Le Théorème du châle" – 3'55"
5. "J'suis pas" – 3'32"
6. "Harragas (les brûlés)" – 4'29"
7. "Tu peux toujours courir" – 3'39"
8. "La Promesse faite aux mains" – 3'48"
9. "La Chance" – 3'53"
10. "Les Proverbes" – 3'59"
11. "Le Talent" – 4'02"
12. "La Correction" – 4'25"

== Charts ==
=== Weekly charts ===
Chart (2012)	Peak position
Belgian Heatseekers (Ultratop Wallonia)	4
French Albums (SNEP)	4
Suisse romande Albums (Media Control)	24

=== Year-end charts ===
Chart (2012)	Position
French Albums (SNEP)	112
