= Poles in France =

Polish emigrants in France

Total population
- 500,000 to 1,000,000 (2010 estimate)

Regions with significant populations
- Île-de-France, Nord-Pas-de-Calais, Alsace, Lorraine, Centre-Val de Loire, Rhône-Alpes, Aquitanie, Poitou-Charentes, Provence-Alpes-Côte d'Azur

Languages
- Polish, French

Religion
- Christianity, atheism, irreligion, Judaism

Related ethnic groups
- Poles, French, Silesians, Germans in France, Czechs in France

Poles in France form one of the largest Polish diaspora communities in Europe. Between 500,000 and one million people of Polish descent live in France, concentrated in the Nord-Pas de Calais region, in the metropolitan area of Lille, the historic coal-mining basin (Bassin Minier) around Lens and Valenciennes and in the Ile-de-France.

Prominent members of the Polish community in France have included king Stanisław Leszczyński, Frédéric Chopin, Adam Mickiewicz, Adam Jerzy Czartoryski, Aleksander Chodźko, Marie Curie, Michel Poniatowski, Laurent Koscielny, Raymond Kopa, Ludovic Obraniak, Edward Gierek (who was raised there), Matt Pokora and singer Jean-Jacques Goldman and Rene Goscinny.

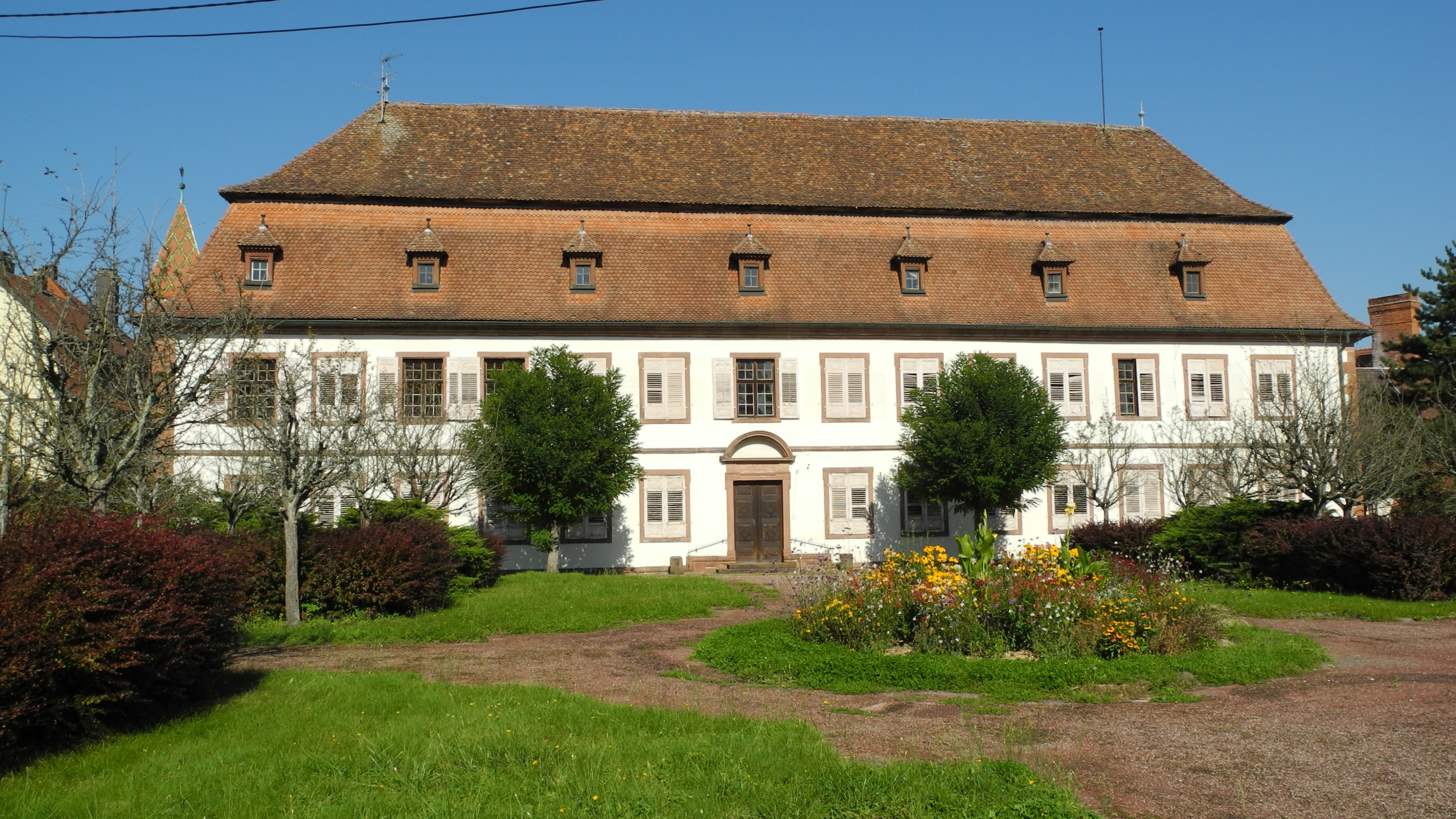
Stanisław Leszczyński's Palace in Wissembourg

== History ==
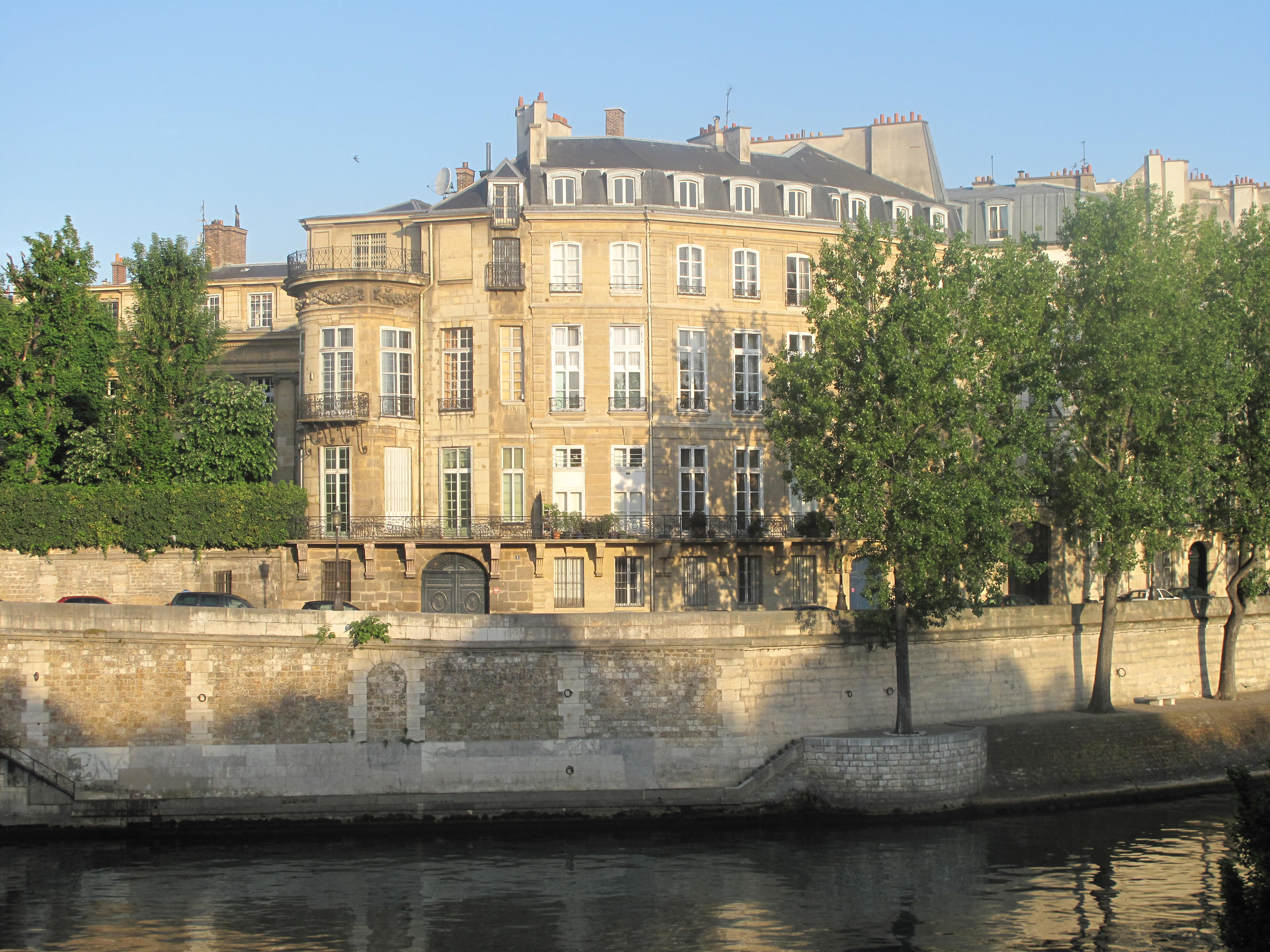
Hôtel Lambert was a center of Polish exiles associated with Prince Adam Jerzy Czartoryski.

=== Polish-Lithuanian Commonwealth ===
Close ties between the Kingdom of France and Polish–Lithuanian Commonwealth were cemented in the 16th century, when emissaries from Poland persuaded French Prince Henri de Valois to stand for election as King of the Commonwealth. Valois won and reigned for two years in Poland but abdicated after he inherited the French throne as Henri III. The queen consort of Louis XV and grandmother of several of his successors was Marie Leszczyńska (1703-1768).

=== French Revolution and Napoleonic wars ===
Many members of the Polish Szlachta fled to France during the rule of Napoleon when 100,000 Poles tried to throw off Russian rule in Poland early in the 19th century. Many had enlisted to fight in the Grande Armée, like Józef Antoni Poniatowski, Ludwik Mateusz Dembowski Polish commanders of the Napoleonic Wars and Polish legionnaires.

=== Great Emigration (1831-1870) ===
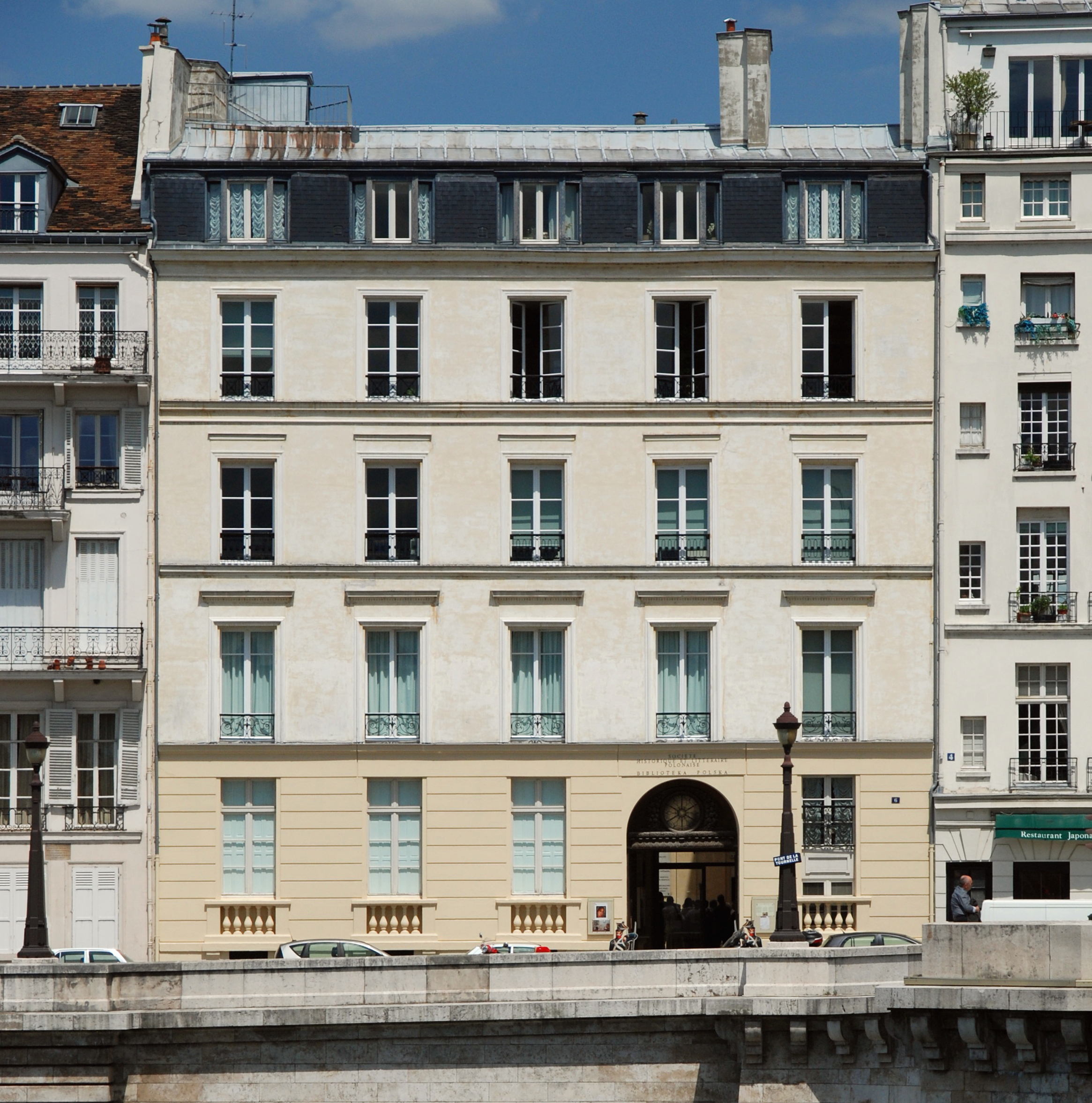
The Polish Library in Paris, founded in 1838, was added in 2003 to UNESCO's Memory of the World Register.

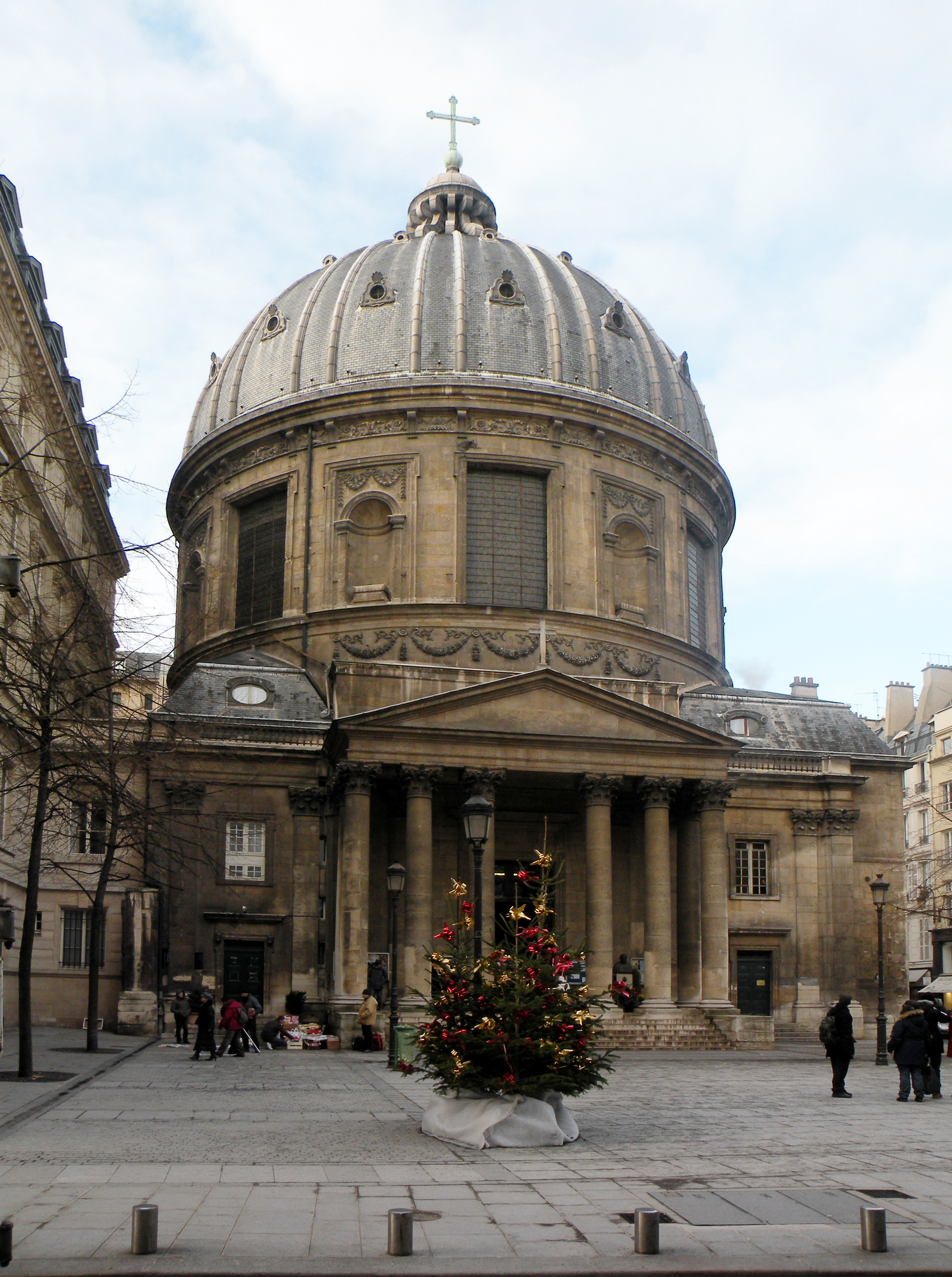
Notre-Dame-de-l'Assomption is the main Polish church of Paris.

The so-called Great Emigration was the flood of exiles in the aftermath of both the 1830-1 November Uprising, and a generation later, the January Uprising, made up of political élites mainly from the Russian Partition of Poland-Lithuania between 1831 and 1870 who settled in France.

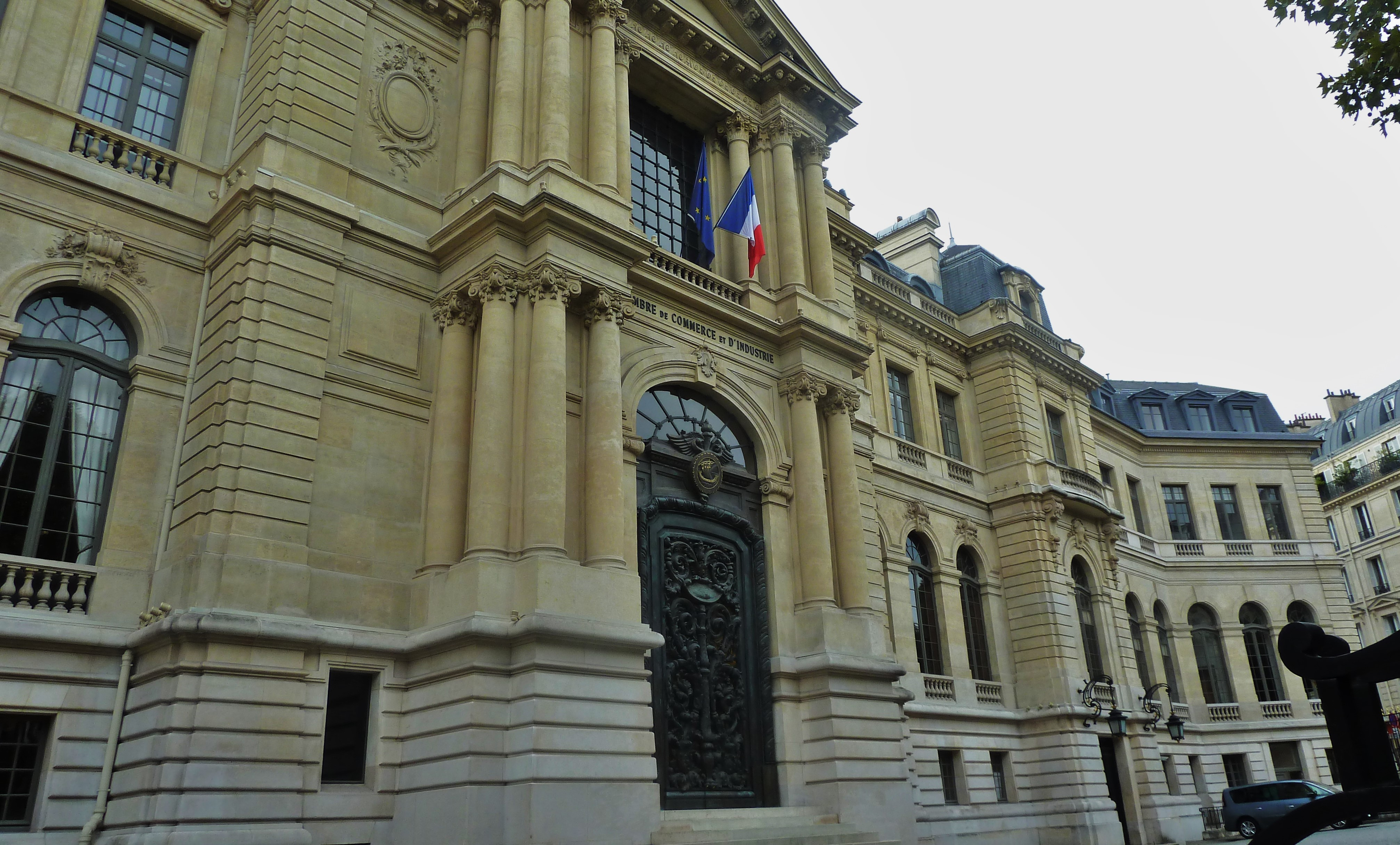
The Potocki Palace in Paris was built in years 1878-1884

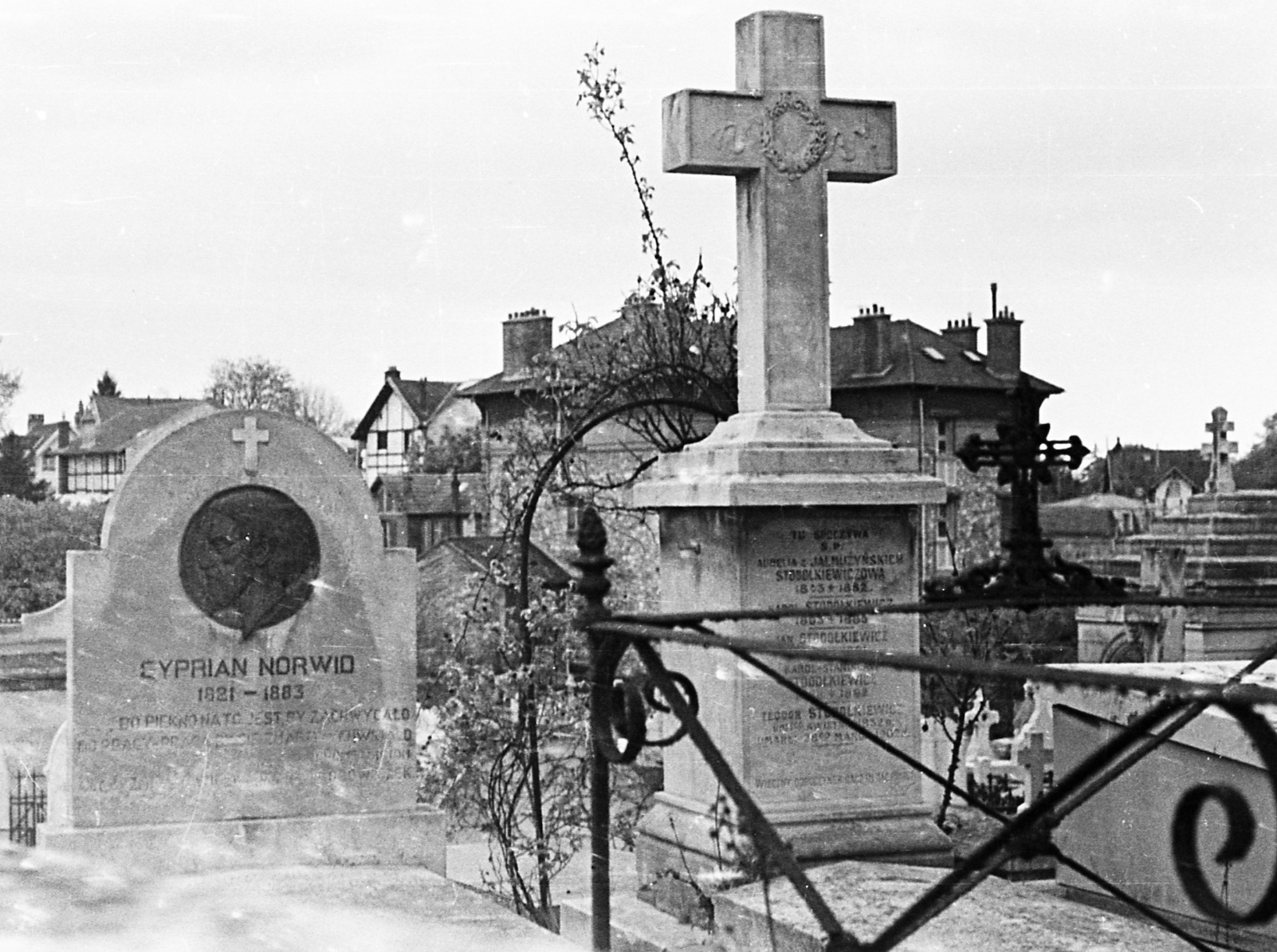
The grave of Cyprian Norwid, among other Polish burials in the Cimetière des Champeaux de Montmorency

=== Interwar period ===
Another wave of Polish migration, this time in search of manual work, took place between the two World Wars, when thousands of Poles were hired as contract workers to work temporarily in France. Numerous Polish farmers emigrated to the southwest of France in the 1920s, as the mass casualties of World War I left that region critically short of farm labor. After the outbreak of World War II Polish refugees also fled German or Soviet occupation.

=== Polish resistance during the Nazi occupation in France ===
During the Nazi occupation of Poland, a specific Polish Resistance group, Polska Organizacja Walki o Niepodleglosc – Organisation Polonaise de Lutte pour l’Indépendance (POWN), was created on September 6, 1941, by the Polish general consul in Paris, Aleksander Kawalkowski (code name Justyn), and fought alongside the French Resistance. There were also other Polish Resistance movements in France, most notably former soldiers from the Jaroslaw Dabrowski Brigade who had fought in the International Brigades during the Spanish Civil War went on in their struggle against Fascism in the FTP-MOI. Since 1941 PPS activists in Northern France had also founded two resistance movements, Organisation S and Orzel Bialy (White Eagle). In 1944 Polish Committees for National Liberation (PKWN) were set up to support the Communist Polish army. There were clashes between POWN resistants, under the authority of the London-based Polish government in exile, and the Communist FTP-MOI resistants.

=== French Poles after WWII ===
When the Communists took power in Poland, several thousand French Poles decided to go and live in the "Socialist paradise", as some Armenians in France moved to the Armenian Soviet Socialist Republic.

There are estimates of 100,000 to 200,000 Poles living in Paris, and many EU program guest workers live in regions of the south, including Arles, Marseille and Perpignan.

=== From the year 2012 ===
The number of new Poles who migrated to France has multiplied, many are students and traders and other percentage are displaced workers who come from Poland to work in France. Poles are well integrated into French society. The number of new Polish citizens in France amounts to 350,000 in 2012.

== Notable people ==
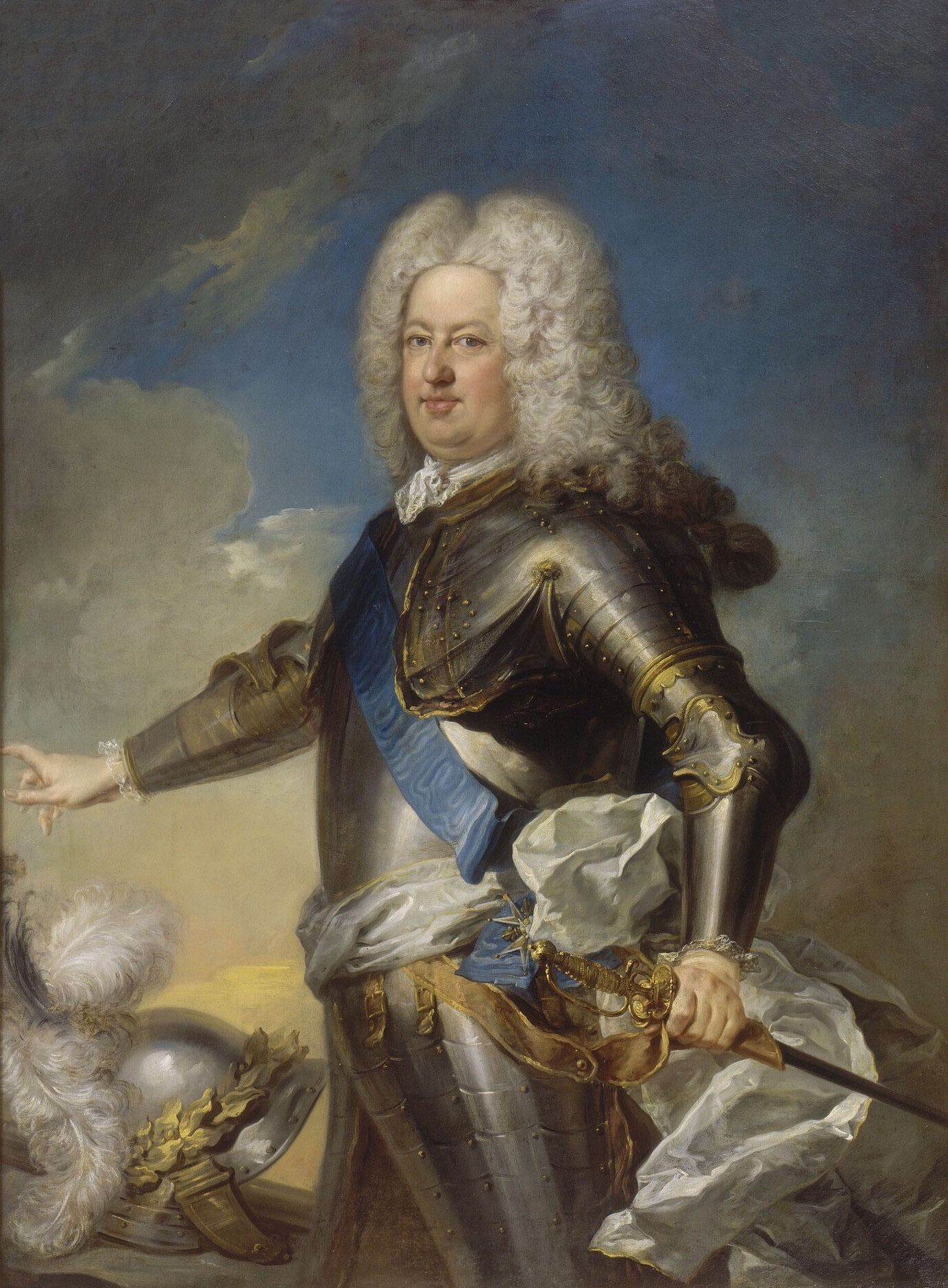
Stanisław Leszczyński

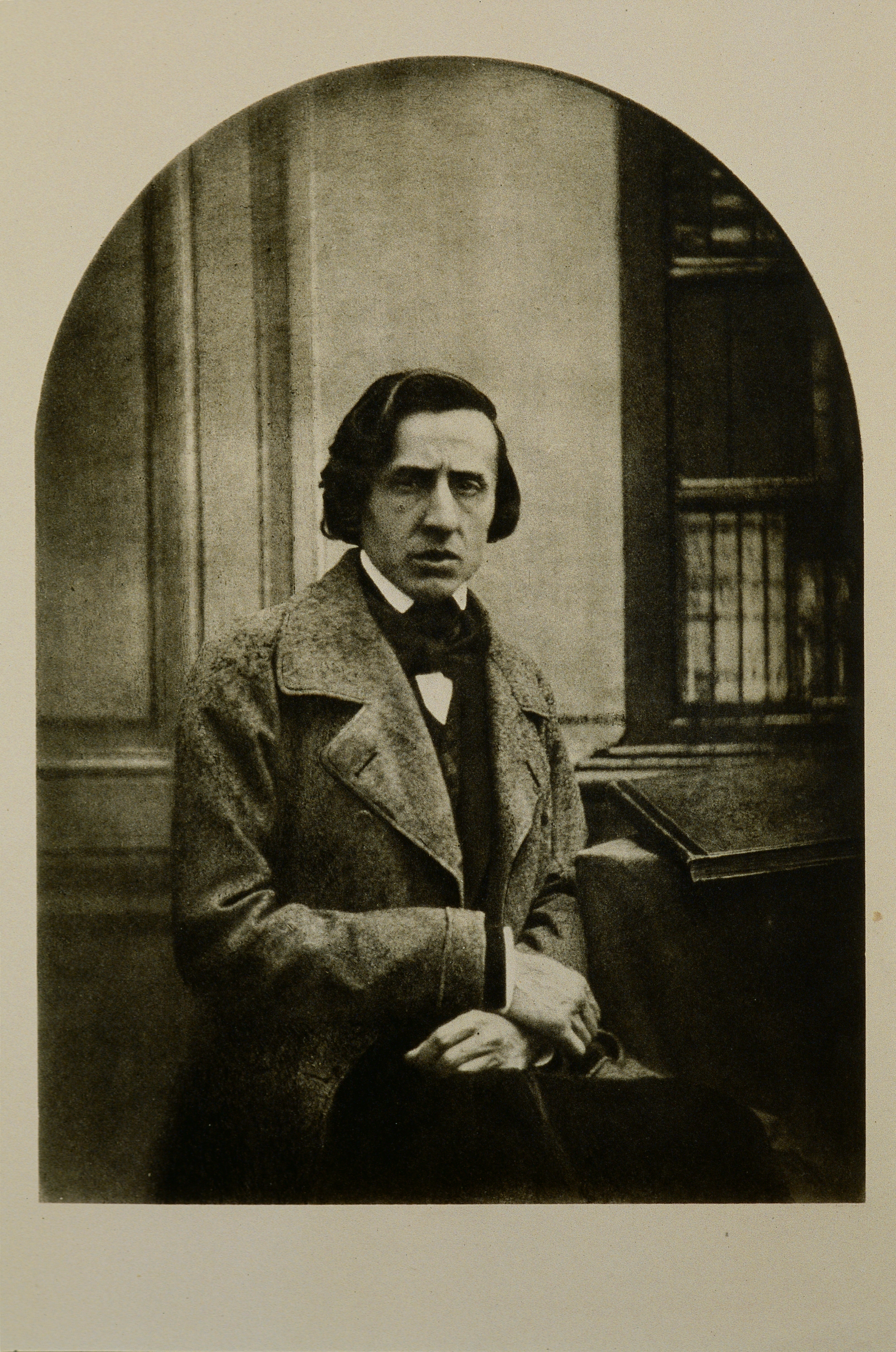
Frédéric Chopin

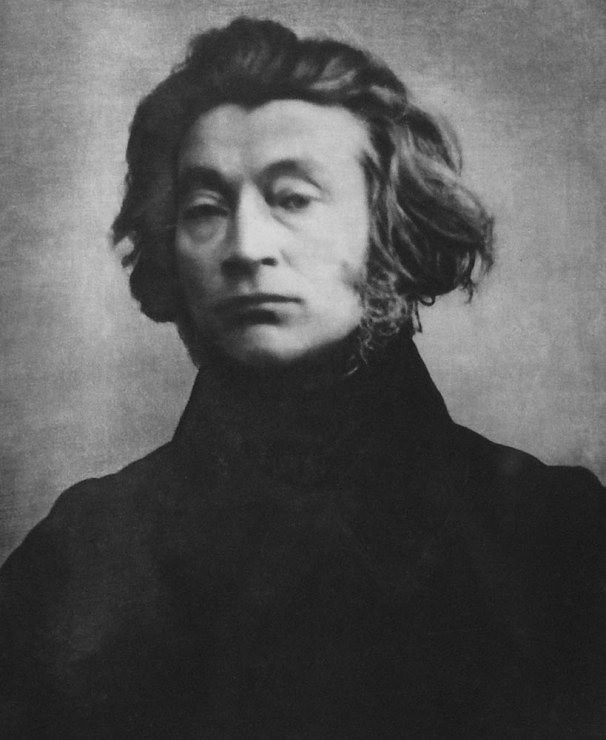
Adam Mickiewicz

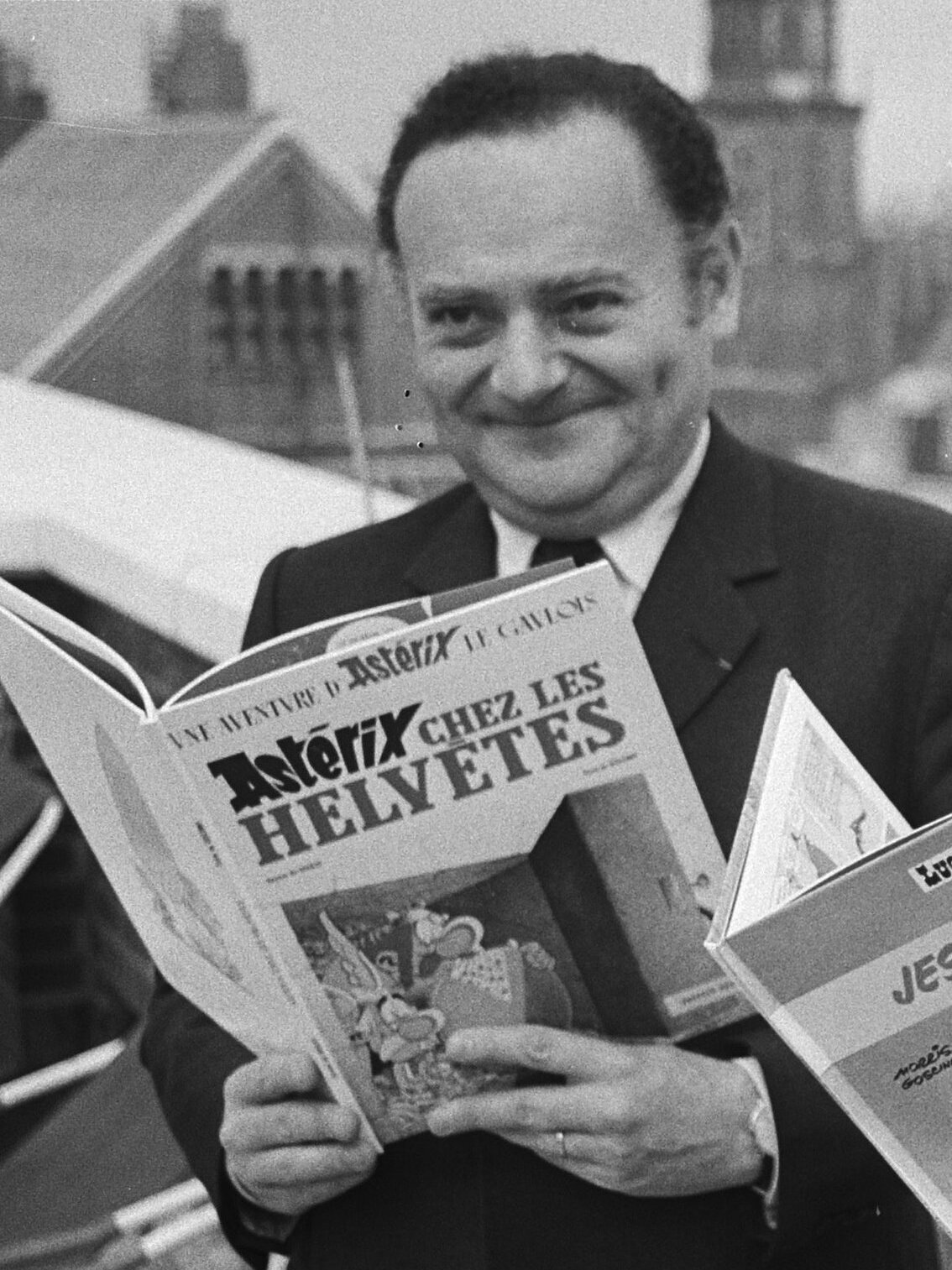
René Goscinny

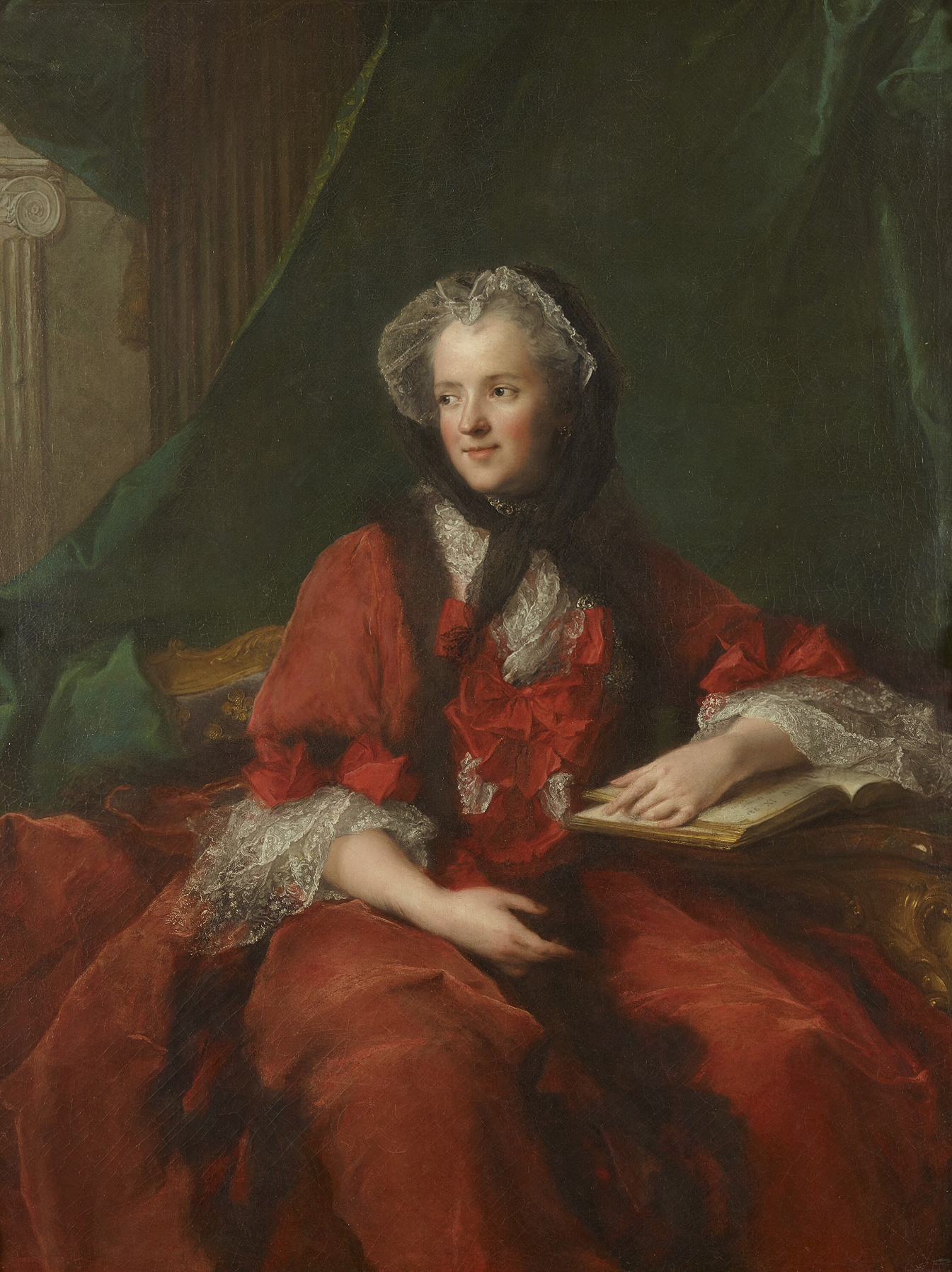
Marie Leszczynska

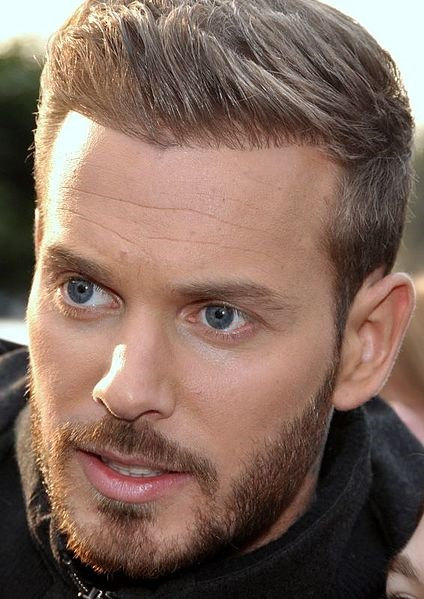
M. Pokora

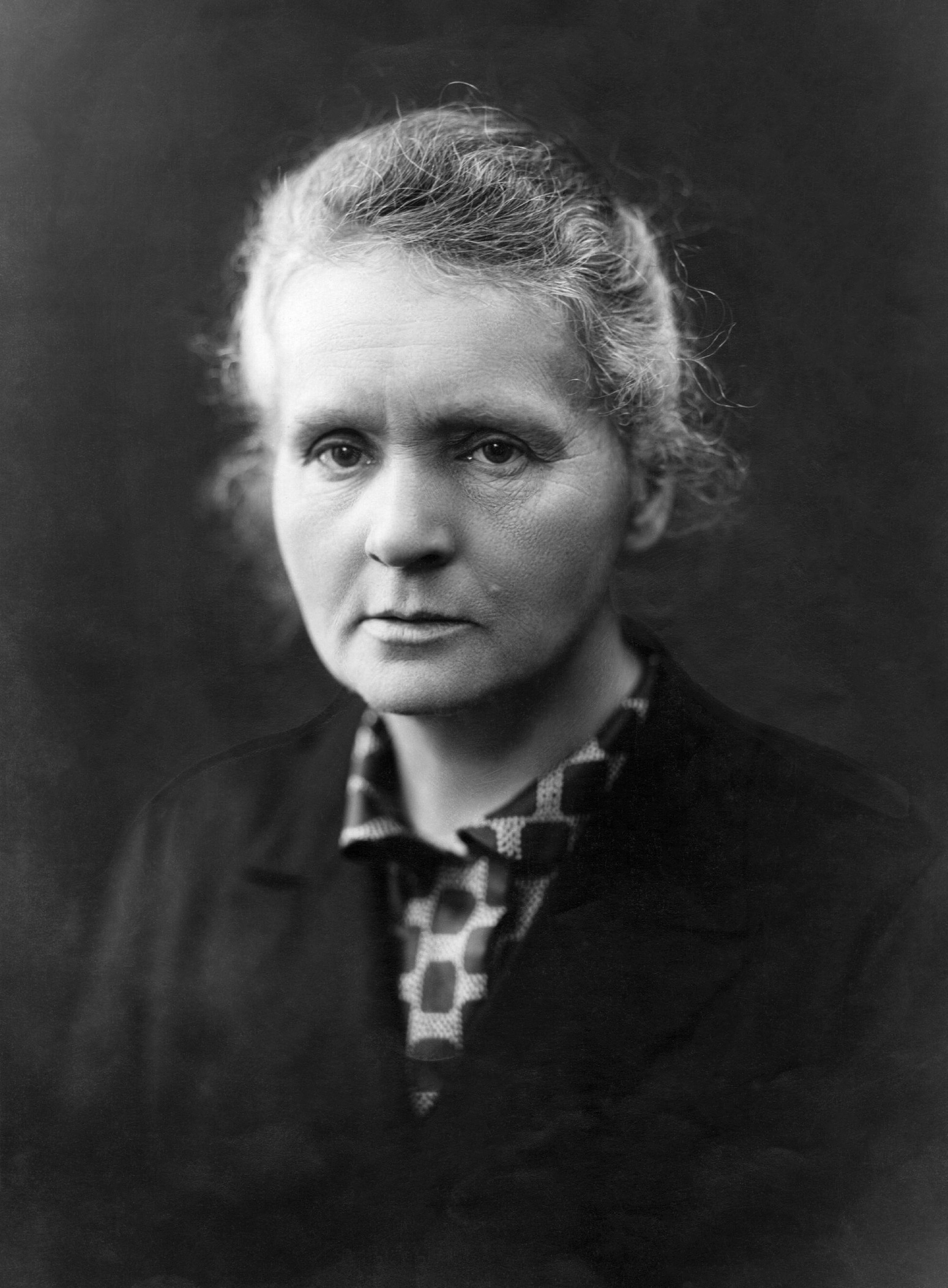
Marie Curie

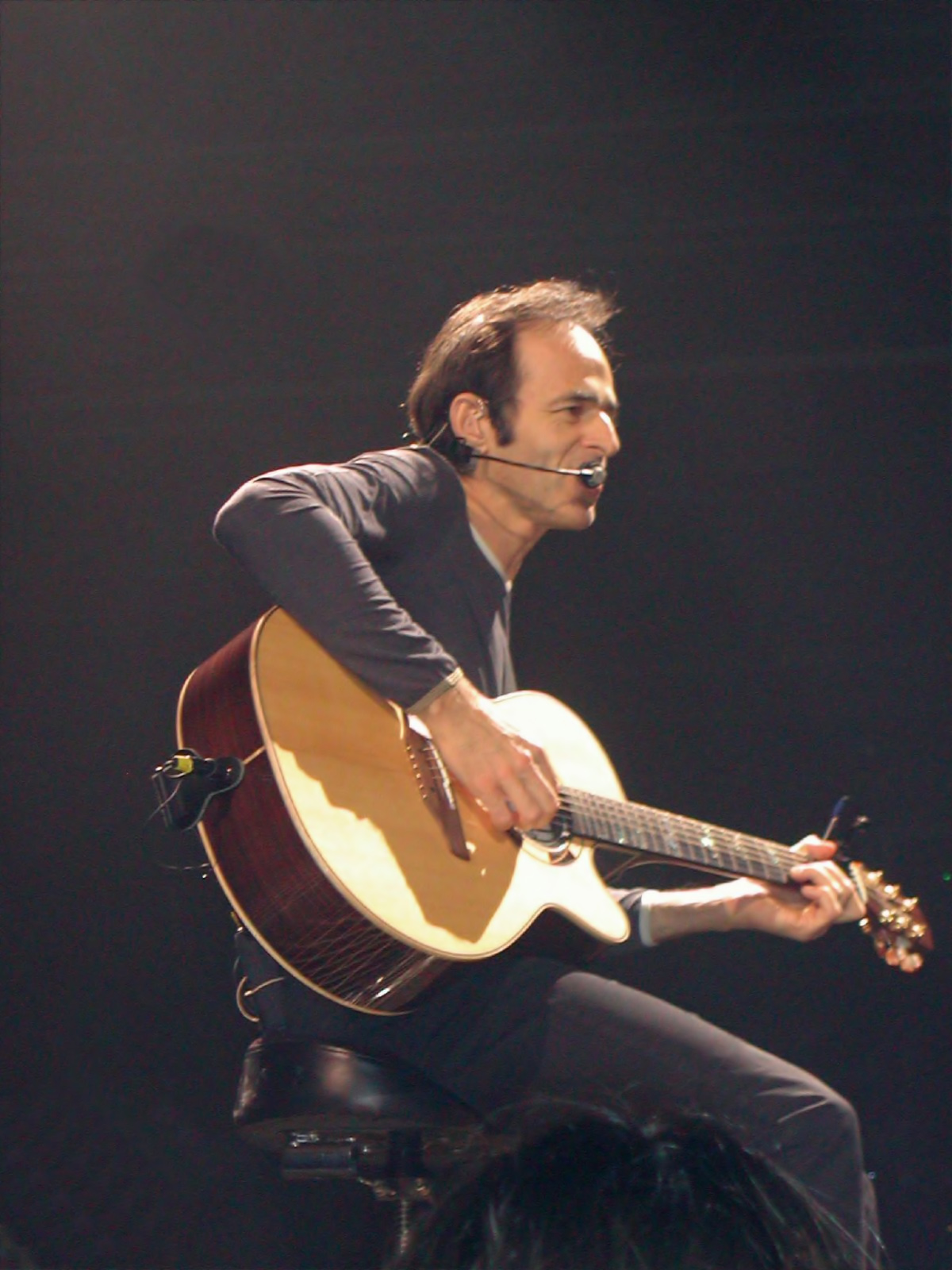
Jean-Jacques Goldman

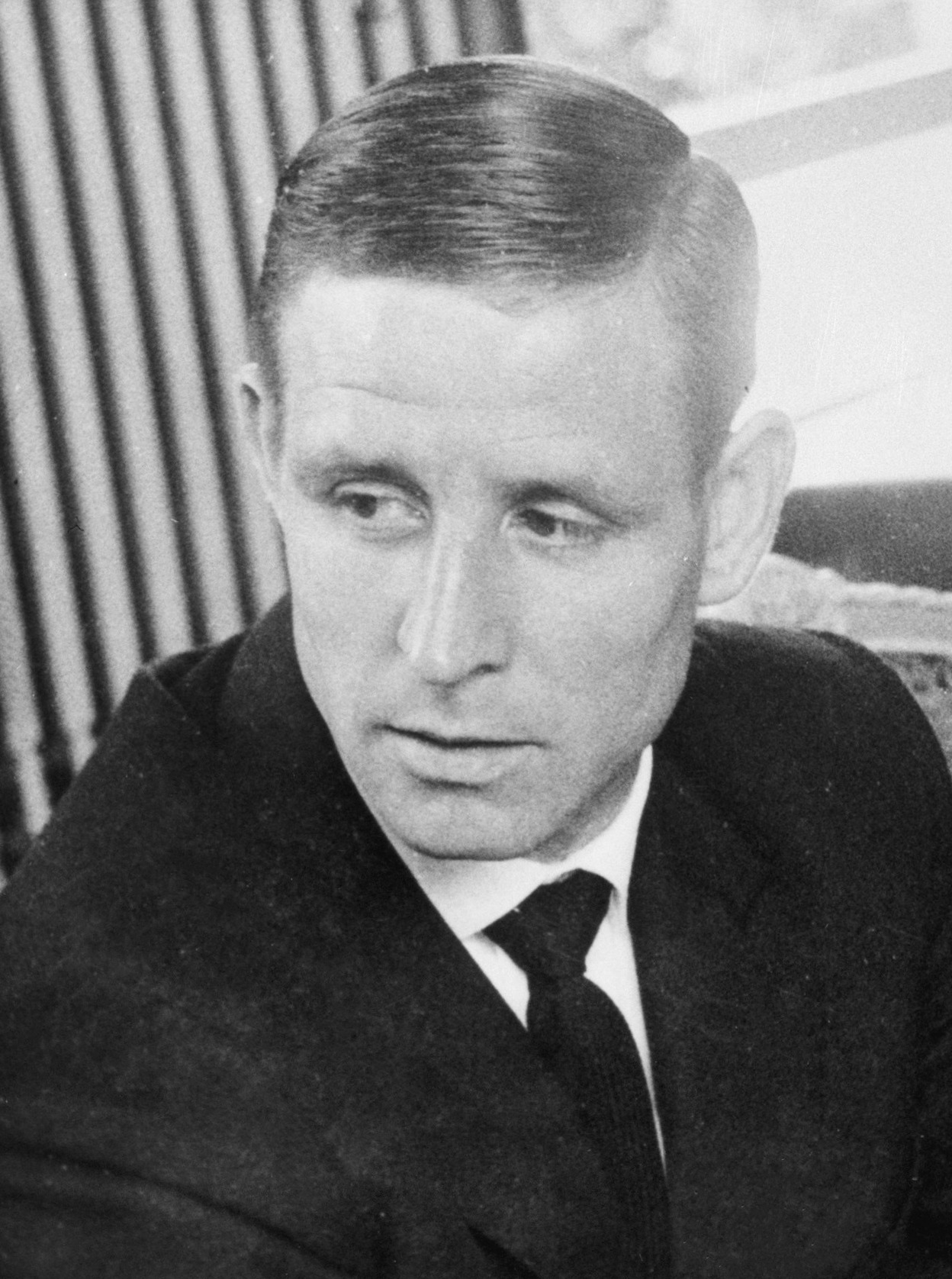
Raymond Kopa

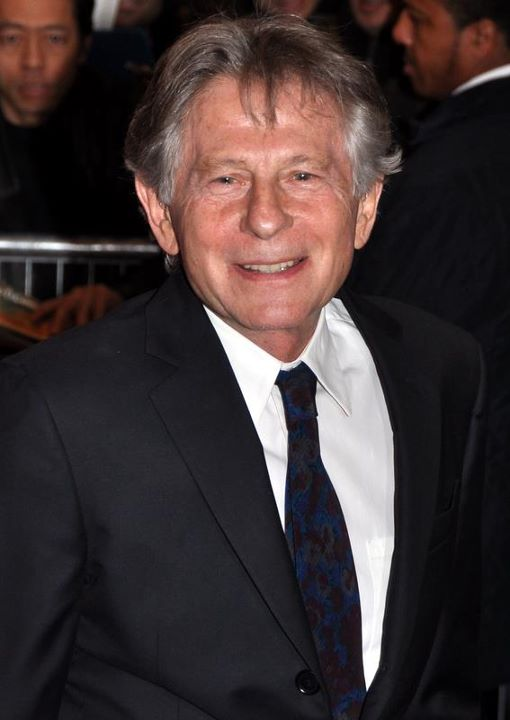
Roman Polanski

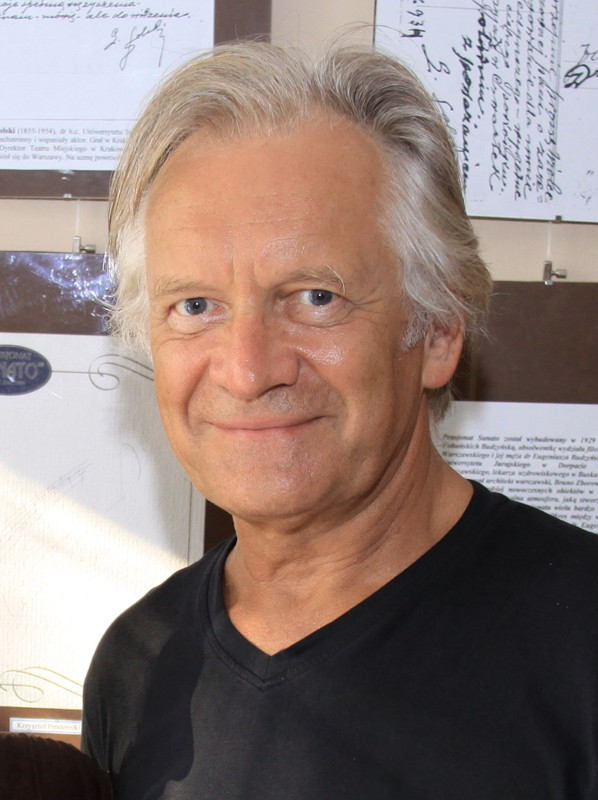
Andrzej Seweryn

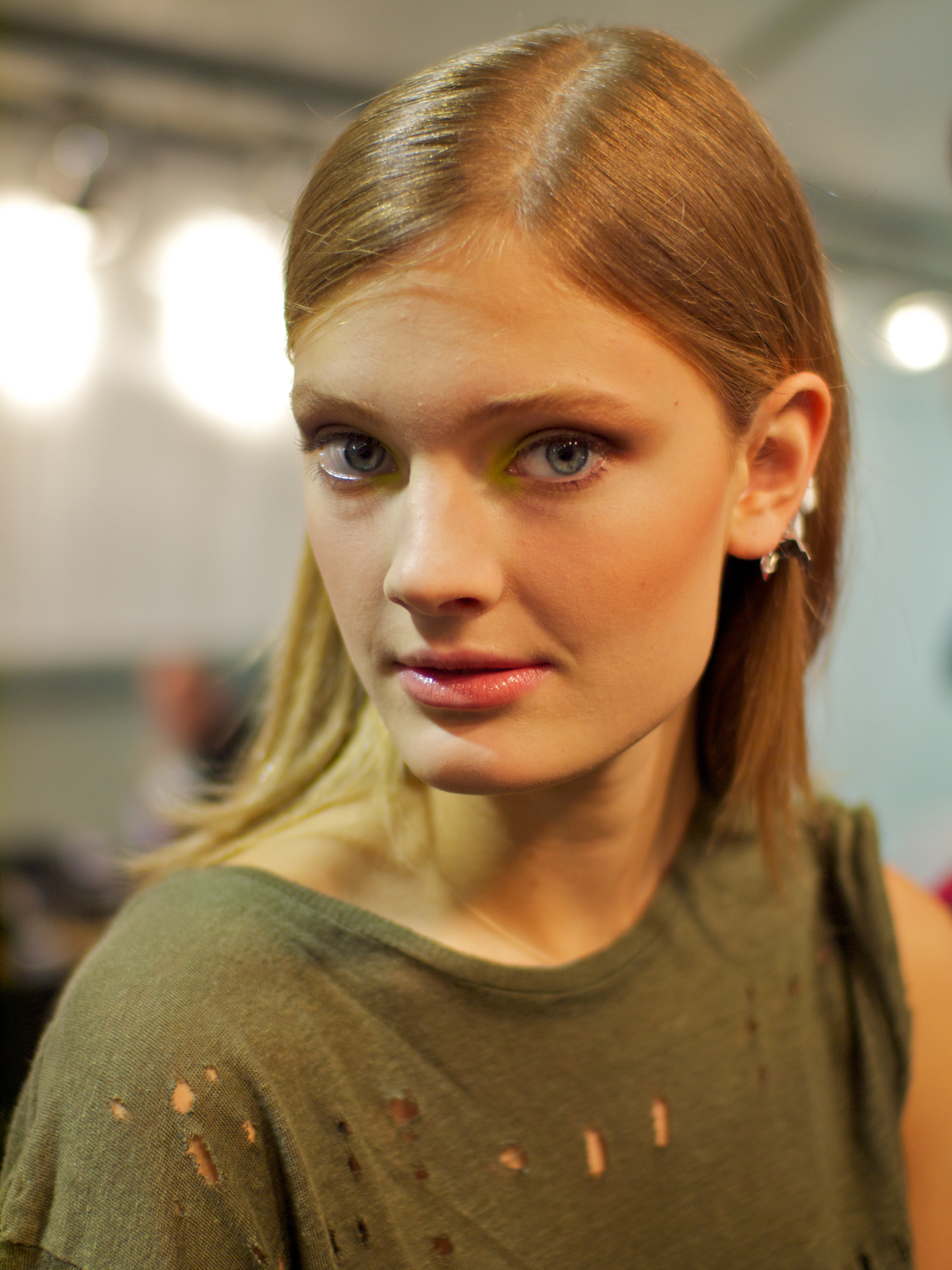
Constance Jablonski

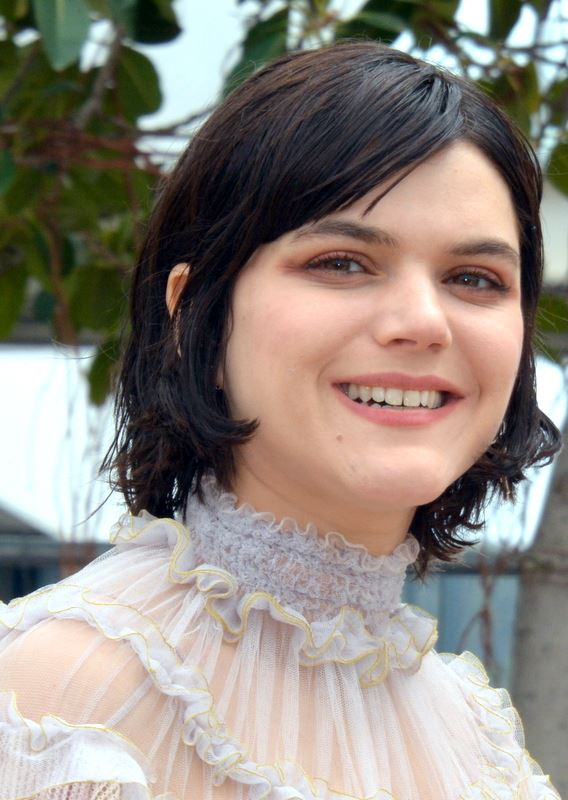
Soko

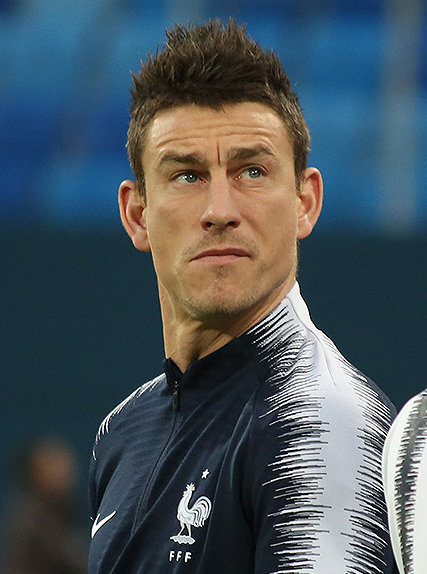
Laurent Koscielny

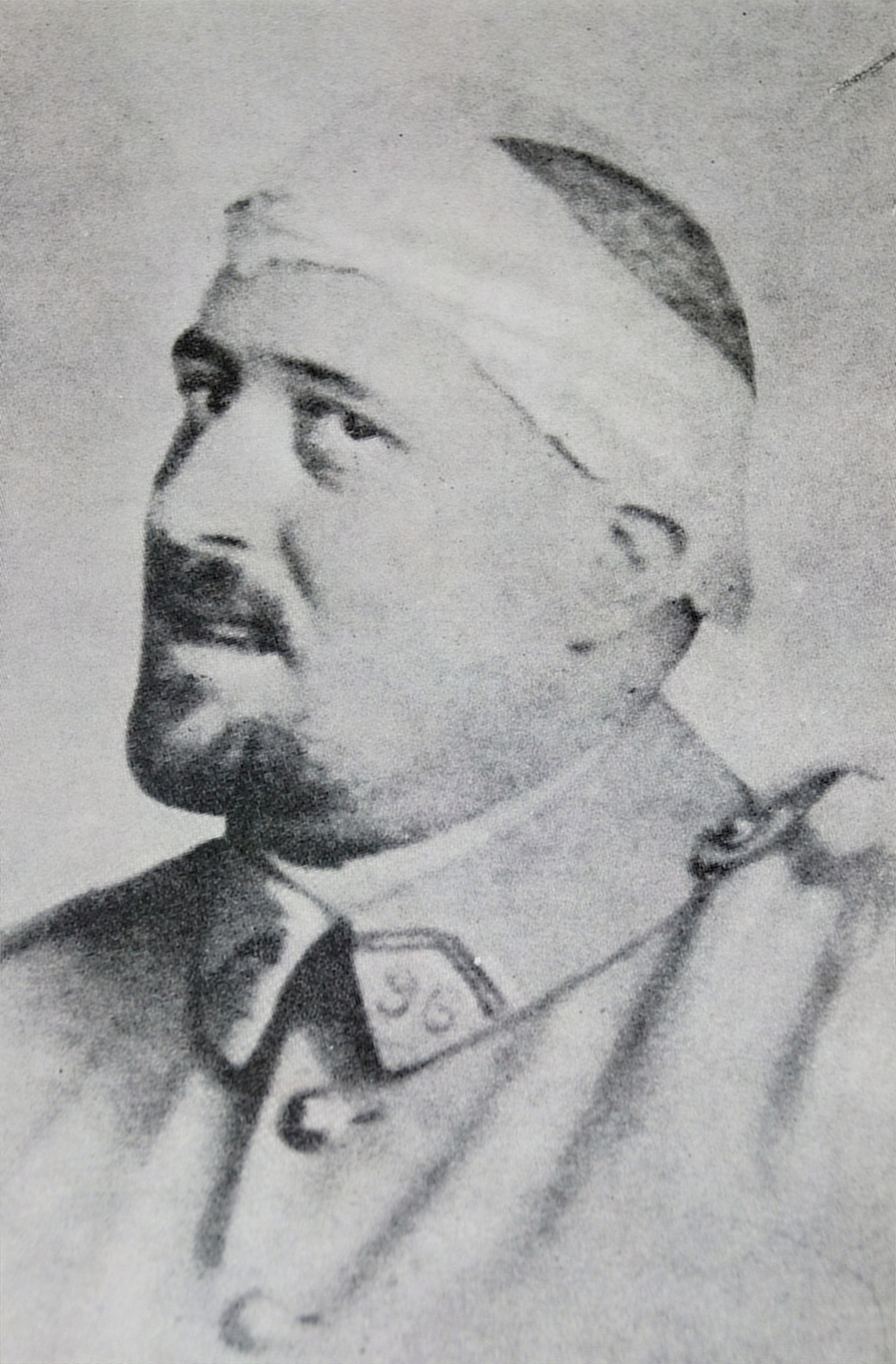
Guillaume Apollinaire

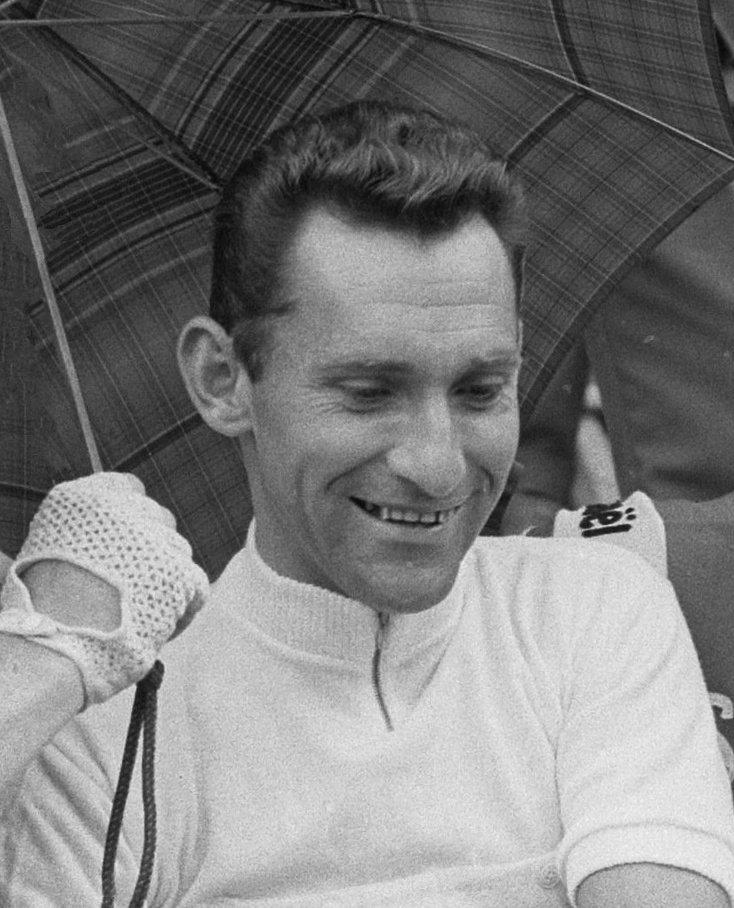
Jean Stablinski

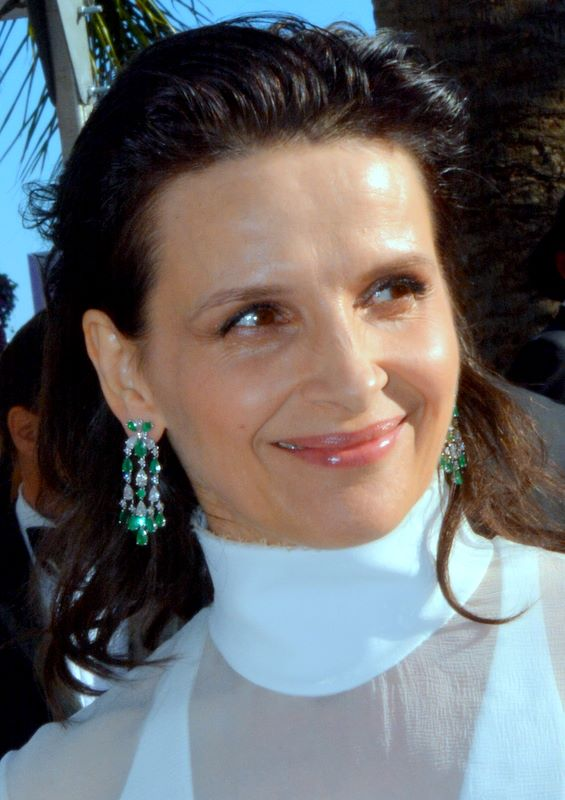
Juliette Binoche

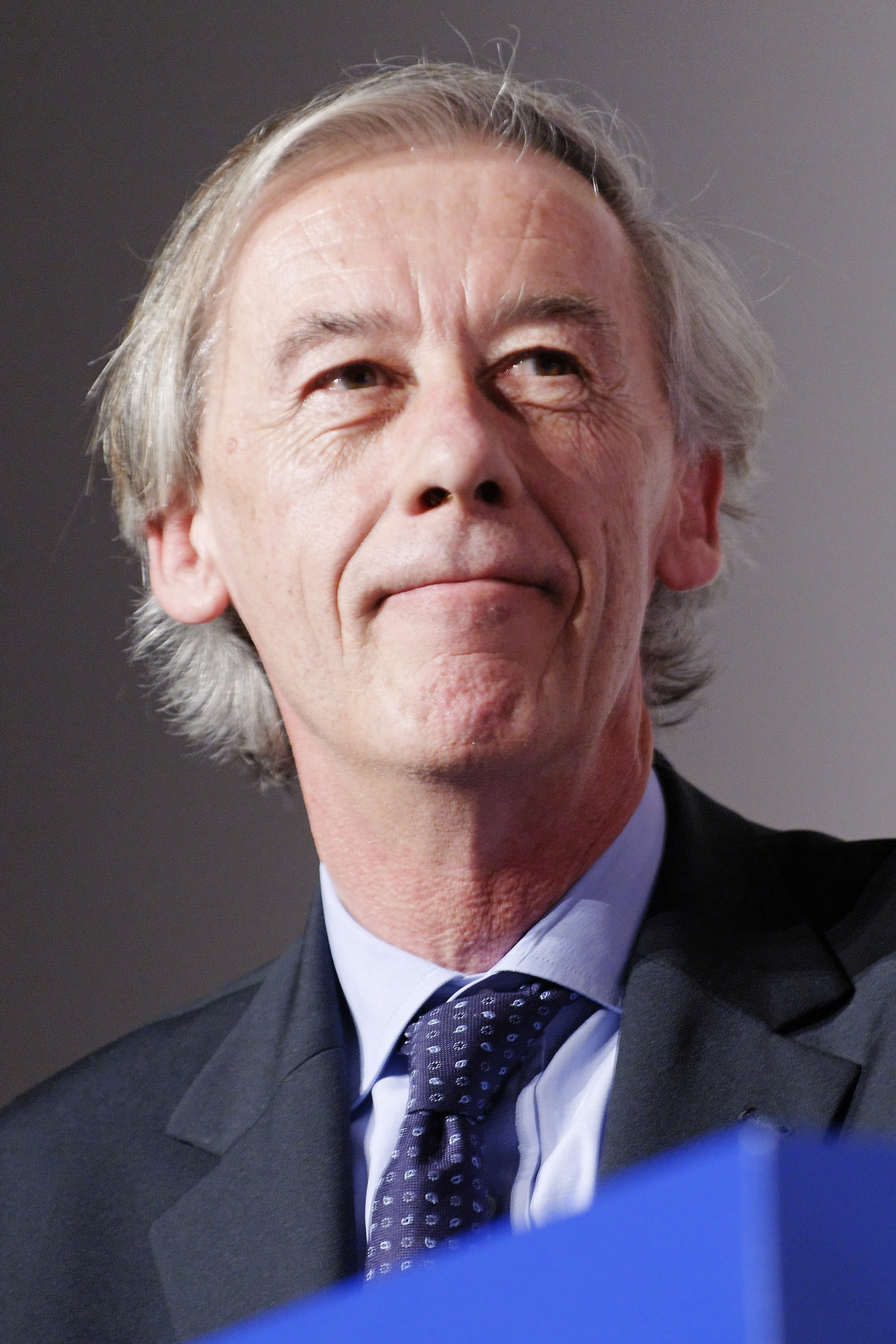
Axel Poniatowski

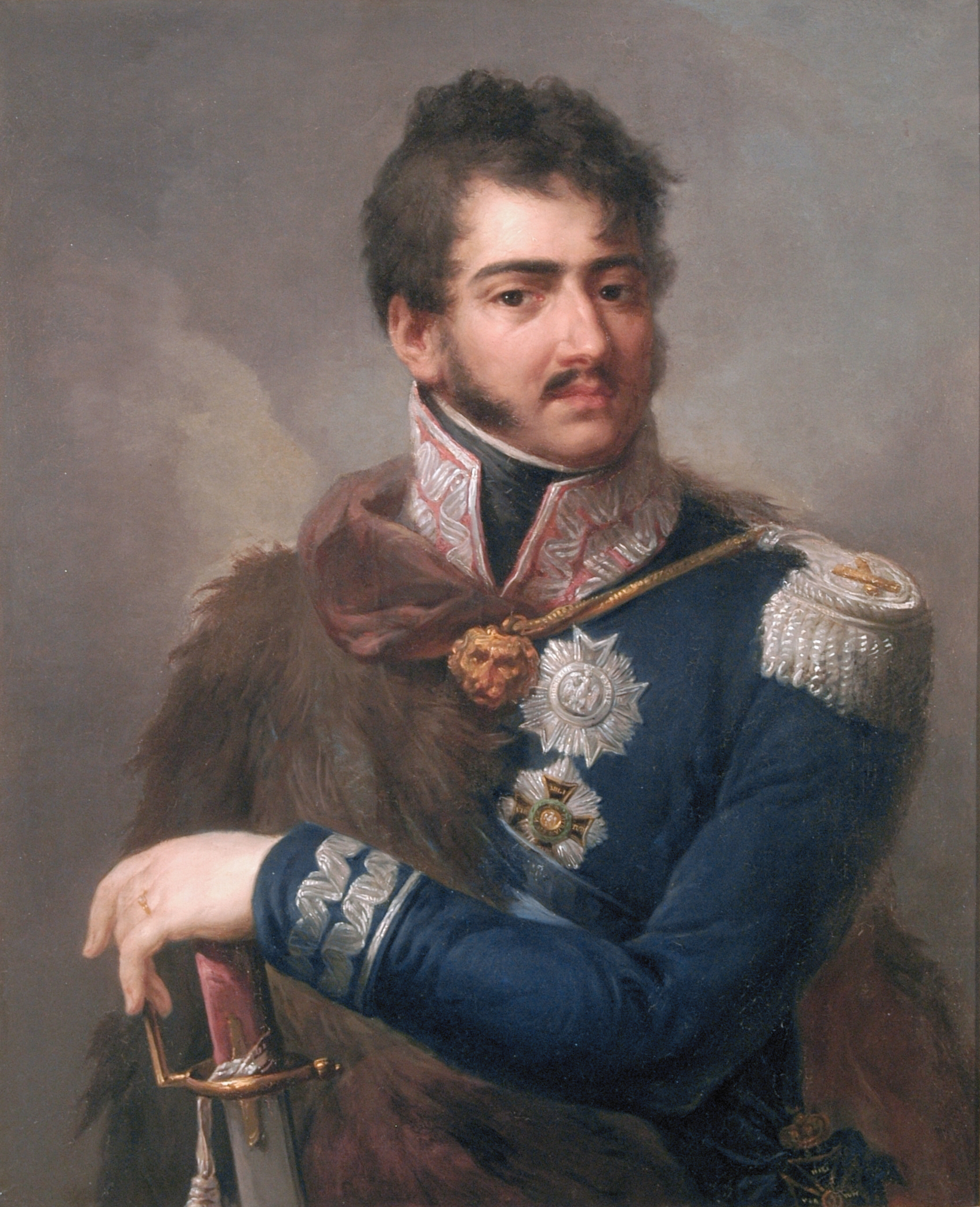
Józef Poniatowski

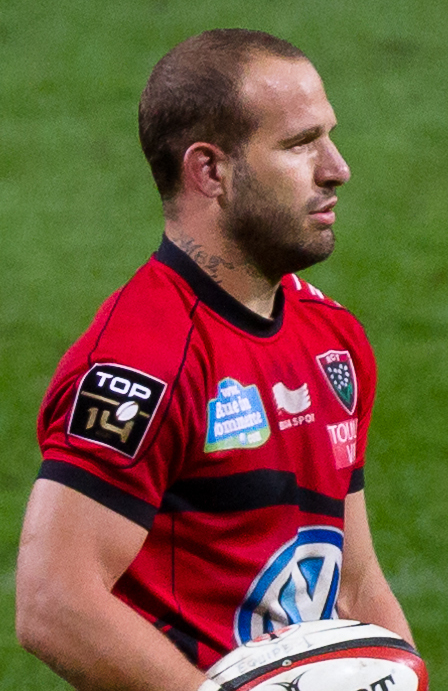
Frédéric Michalak

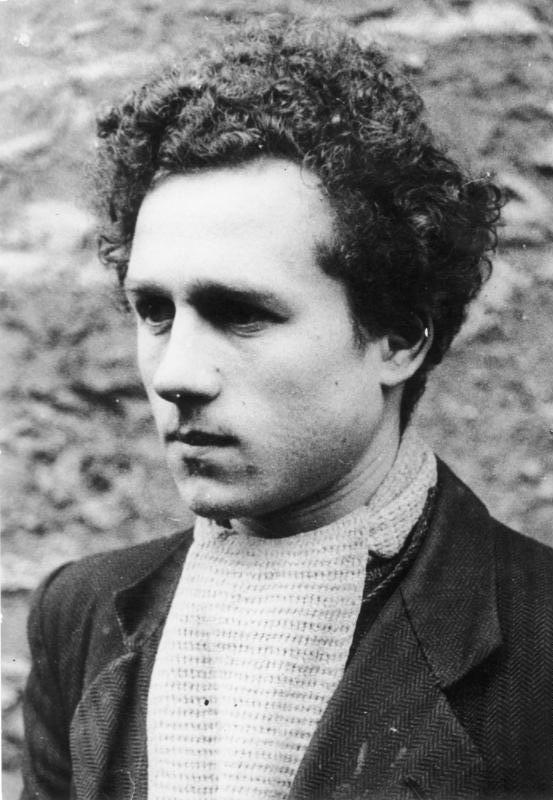
Robert Witchitz

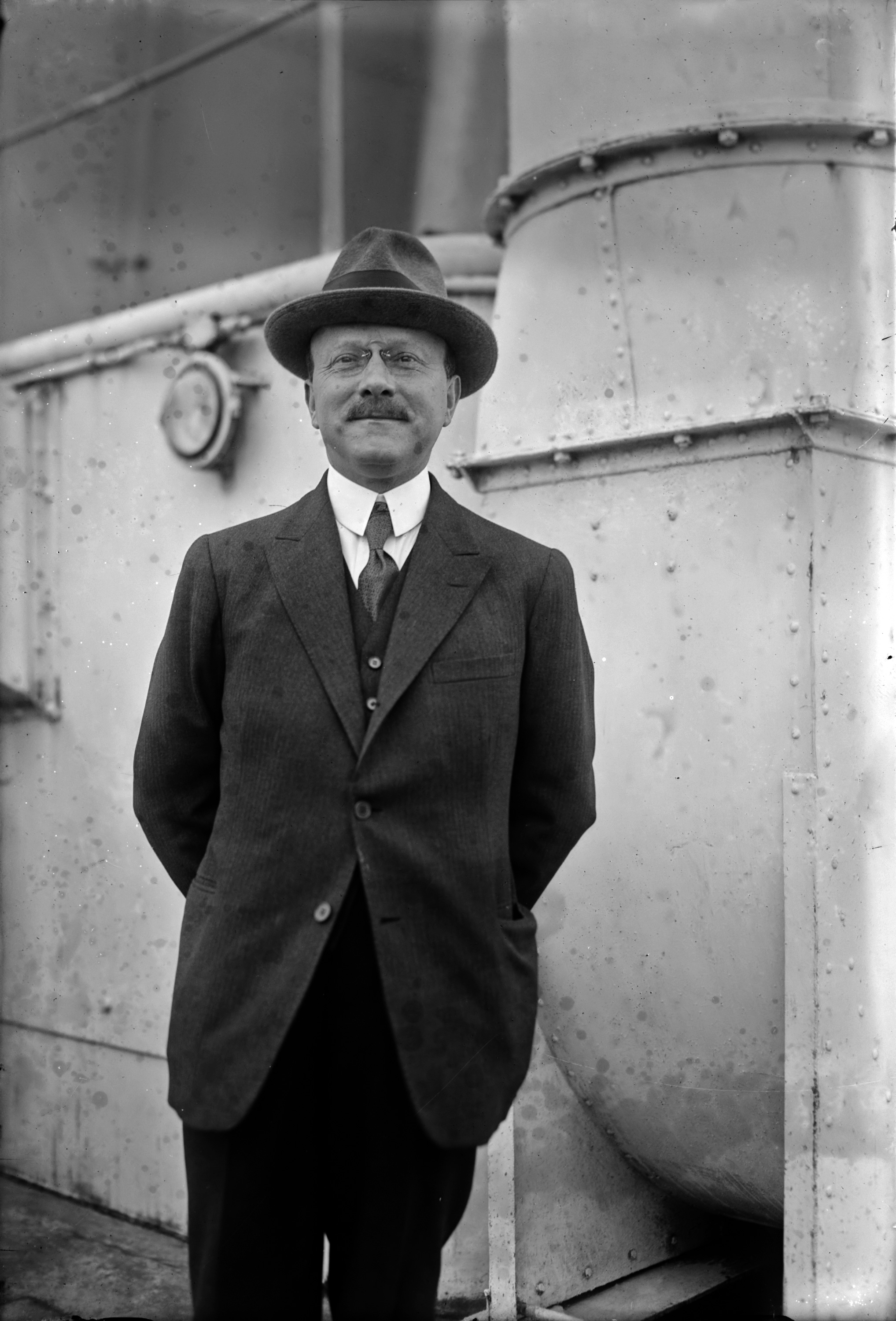
André Citroën

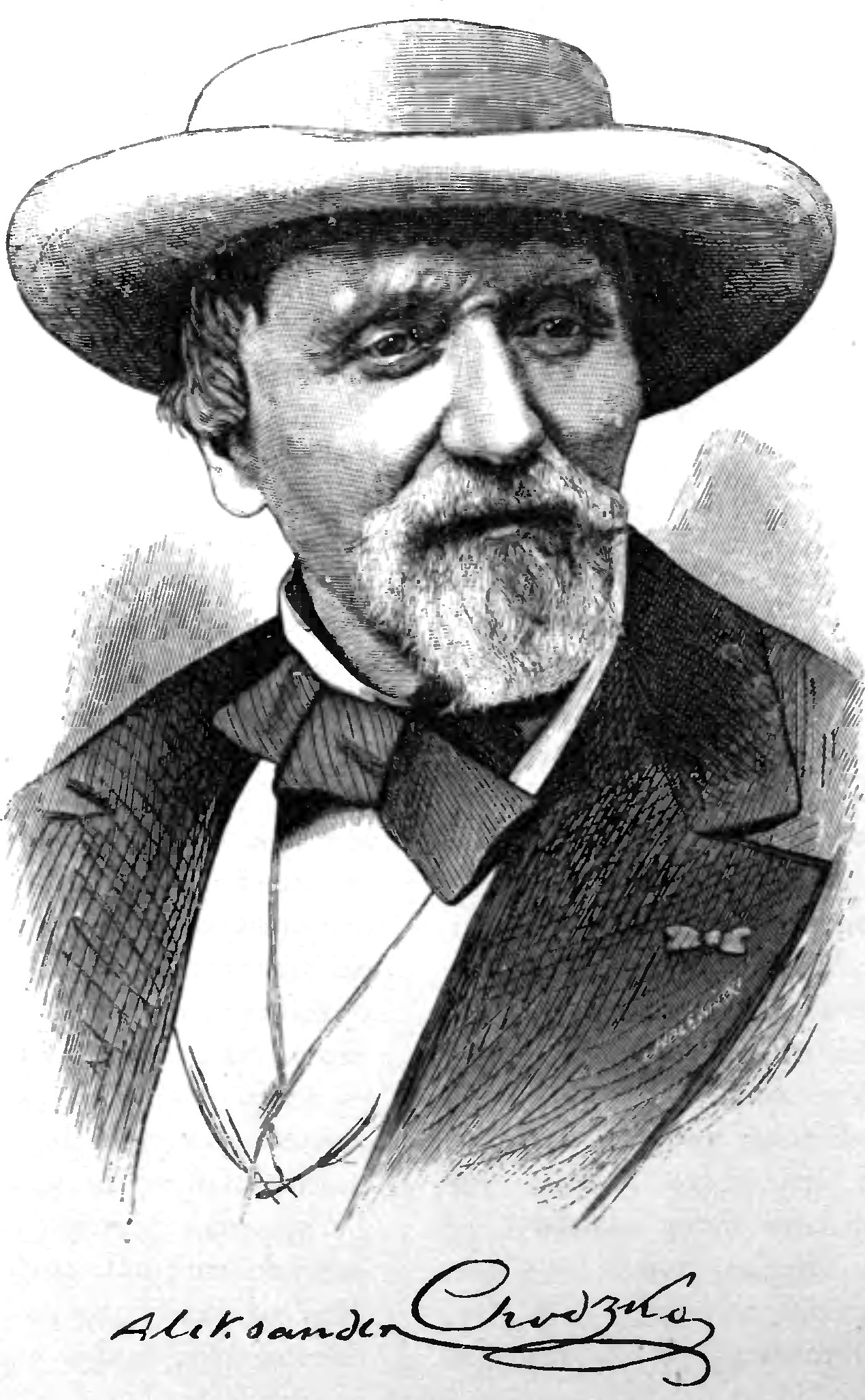
Aleksander Chodźko

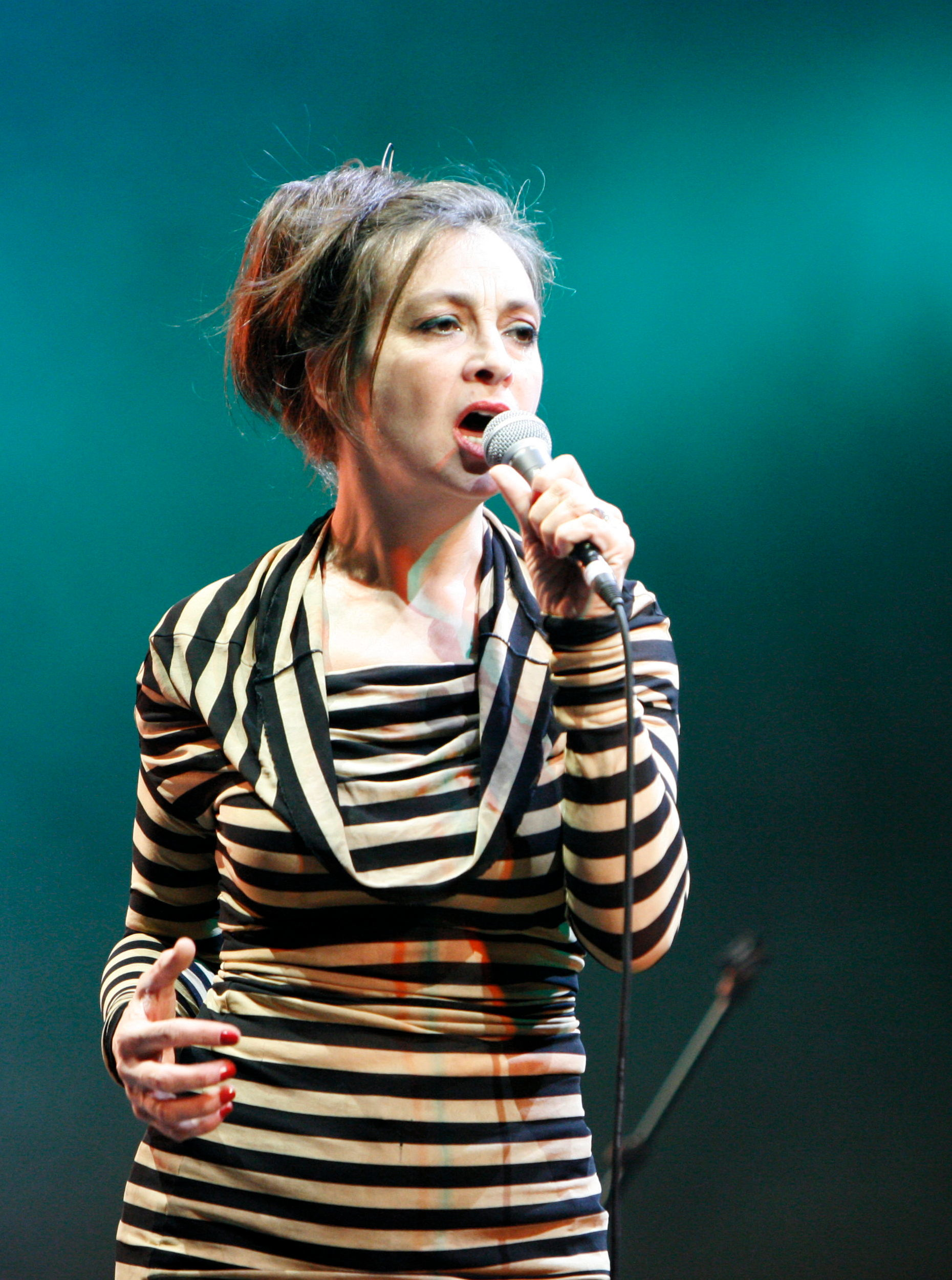
Catherine Ringer

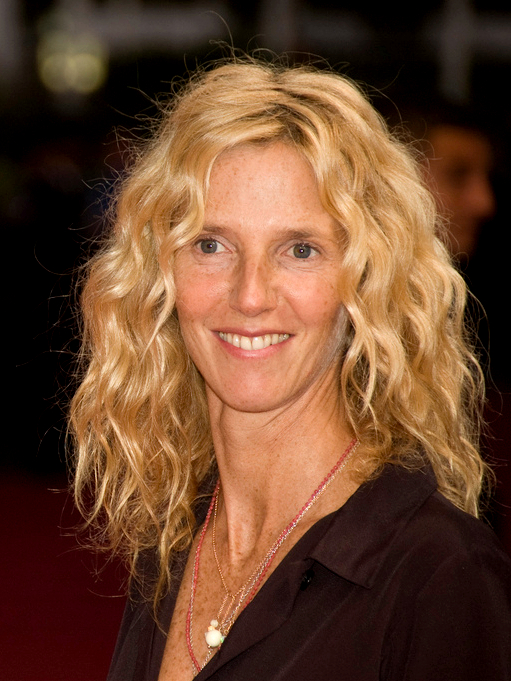
Sandrine Kiberlain

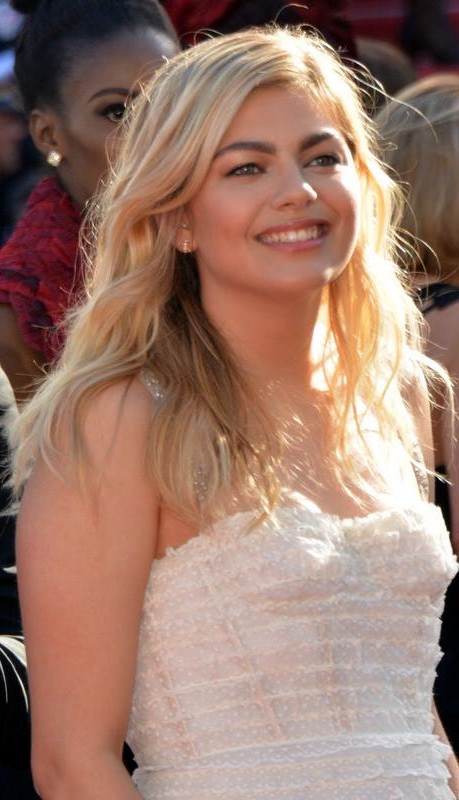
Louane

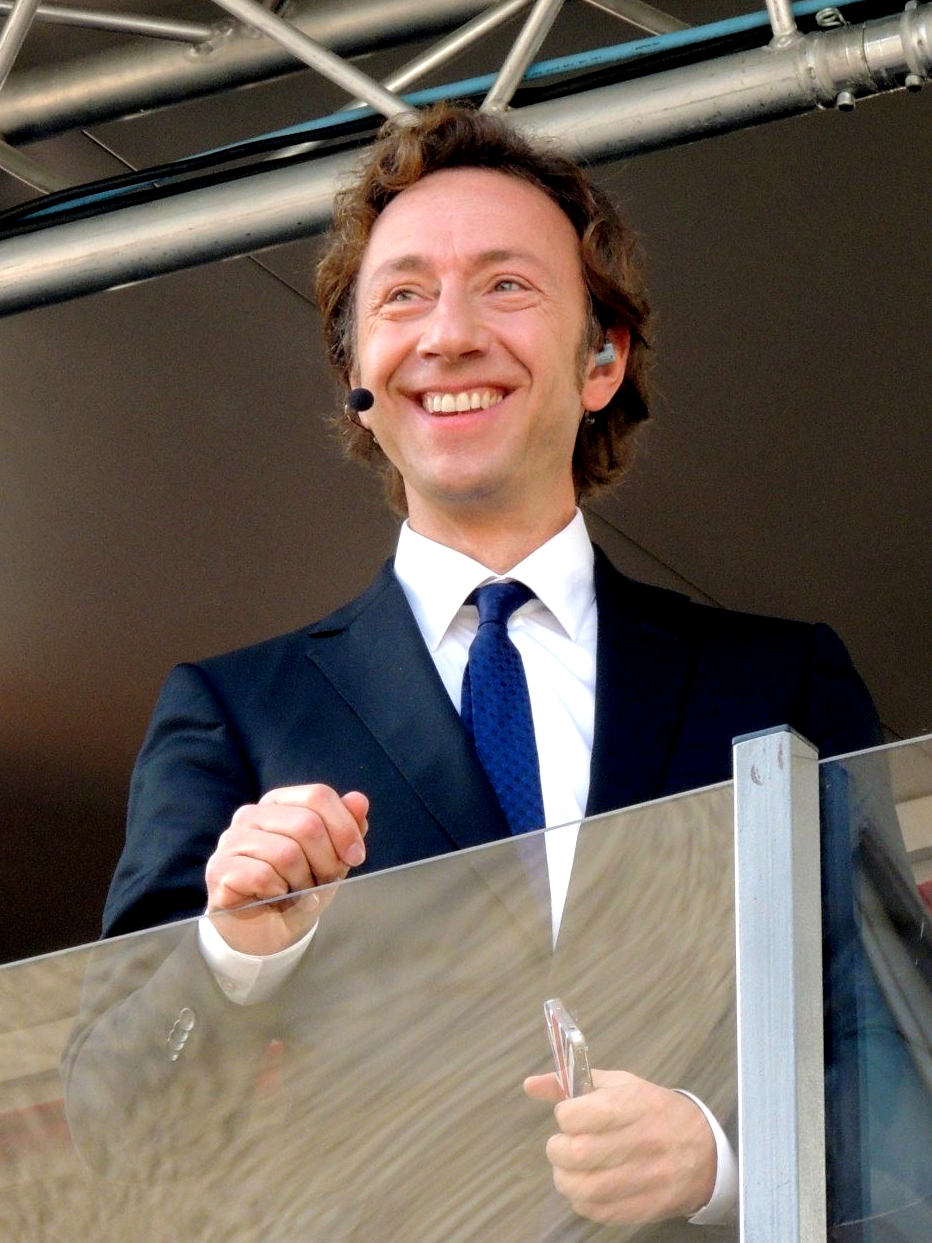
Stéphane Bern

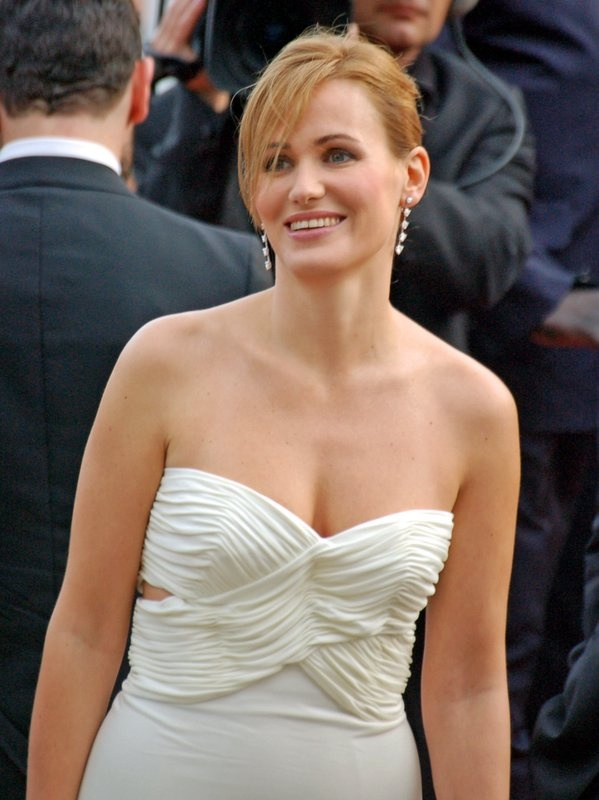
Judith Godrèche

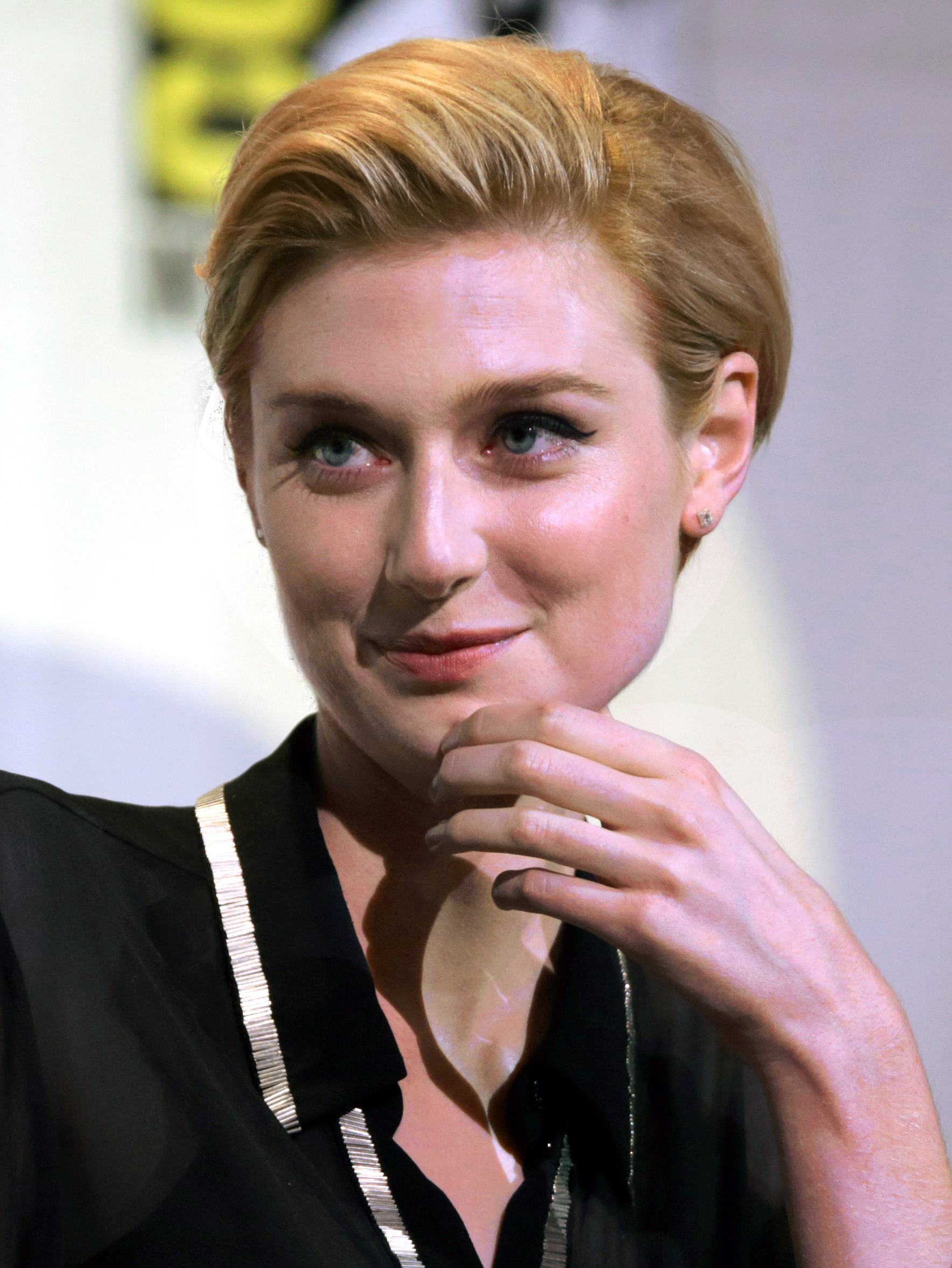
Elizabeth Debicki

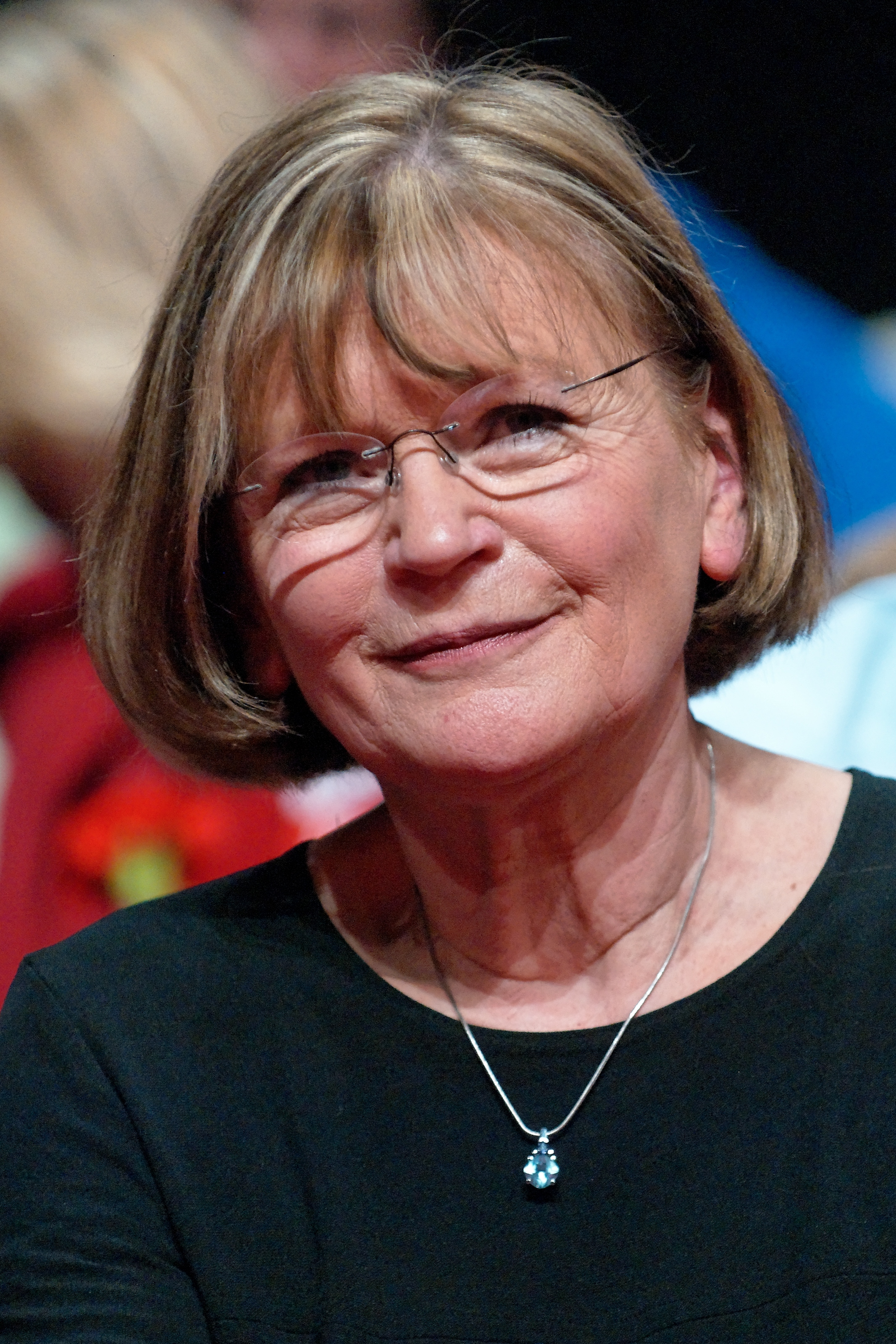
Marie-George Buffet

== See also ==
- See Category:French people of Polish descent for prominent Poles in France
- France–Poland relations
- French people in Poland
- Great Emigration
- Polish Catholic Mission
- Rosa Bailly
- Polonia
- Migrations from Poland since EU accession
- Blue Army (Poland) (1917–1919)
- Polish Army in France (1939-1940)
- Cimetière des Champeaux de Montmorency
- Polish immigration to the Nord-Pas-de-Calais coalfield
