= Comme des Cherokees =

Studio album by Zebda
- Released: 2014
- Recorded: 2014
- Genre: Rock
- Label: Barclay
- Producer: Zebda

Zebda chronology
Second Tour (2012)	Comme des Cherokees (2014)

Comme des Cherokees is the sixth studio album of the French rock group Zebda, released in 2014. The album charted at 22 in France and 81 in Belgium.

== Track listing ==
1. L'Envie 3:21
2. A Suivre 3:15
3. Les Petits Pas 3:50
4. L'Accent Tué 3:51
5. Le Panneau 3:29
6. Appel D'Air 3:13
7. Essai 3:23
8. Fatou 3:18
9. Les Chibanis 3:54
10. Les Morfales 4:34
