= Tomber la chemise =

Single by Zebda

from the album Essence ordinaire
- B-side: "Quinze ans"; "Le pont du carrousel"
- Released: 7 June 1999
- Recorded: 1998
- Genre: Pop rock, reggae
- Length: 4:25
- Label: Barclay, Universal Music
- Songwriters: Magyd Cherfi; Zebda

Zebda singles chronology
"Tomber la chemise" (1999)	"Y'a pas d'arrangement" (1999)

"Tomber la chemise" (literally "Taking Off Shirt" but the meaning is "Get ready to play hard") is a 1998 song by the Toulousian collective Zebda. The song was released on 7 June 1999 as part of the first single from Zebda's third album Essence ordinaire and received a successful reception in France, where it reached number-one on the singles chart and won two awards. This summer 1999 hit song "Tomber la chemise" was part of a sudden popularity trend by rappers of immigrant origins in France at that time.

== Structure and lyrics ==
Although "Tomber la chemise" appeared to be an outsider in the race to the top of the charts that summer, this highly political song became the hit that finally brought Zebda national recognition after eleven years of existence. According to an expert of French charts, this song "devotes an expression of the spoken language, becoming inseparable from this song, and bases its originality on the regional savour that the accent of the Midi conveys". The melody is similar to those of Regg'Lyss songs.

== Chart performance ==
In France, "Tomber la chemise" debuted on the chart at number 11 on 12 June 1999, entered the top ten the next week where it stayed for 20 weeks, three of them spen atop, then it kept on dropping and fell off the top 100 after 30 weeks, achieving diamond certification status. In addition to being a commercial success, the song went on to be named the best French song of 2000 at both the Victoires de la musique awards and the NRJ Music Awards. In Belgium (Wallonia), "Tomber la chemise" remained on the Ultratop 40 for 19 weeks, starting at number 22 on 7 August 1999, climbed and peaked at number three in its seventh week, and totaled ten weeks in the top 10.

== Covers and parodies ==
In 1999, "Tomber la chemise" was parodied by Le Festival Roblès under the title "Solder la Chemise" ("Sell Off Your Shirt"). Les Fatals Picards, a French band which participated in the Eurovision Song Contest 2007, also parodied the song under the name "Monter le pantalon" ("Pull Up Your Pants") on its album Pamplemousse mécanique (A Clockwork Grapefruit).

In 2002, the song was covered by Yannick Noah, Michèle Laroque and Francis Cabrel on the album Tous dans le même bateau (All in the Same Boat), also available on Les Enfoirés's the best of La compil' (vol. 3), released in 2005.

== Track listings ==
- CD single
1. "Tomber la chemise" — 4:25
2. "Quinze ans" — 4:50
3. "Le pont du carrousel" — 4:06

== Charts ==
=== Weekly charts ===
Chart (1999)	Peak position
Belgium (Ultratop 50 Wallonia)	3
France (SNEP)	1
Netherlands (Dutch Top 40)	18
Netherlands (Single Top 100)	22

=== Year-end charts ===
Chart (1999)	Position
Belgium (Ultratop 50 Wallonia)	18
Europe (Eurochart Hot 100)	33
France (SNEP)	5

== Certifications ==
Region	Certification	Certified units/sales
Belgium (BRMA)	Gold	25,000^{*}
France (SNEP)	Diamond	750,000^{*}
^{*} Sales figures based on certification alone.
