= Le bruit et l'odeur (album) =

Studio album by Zebda
- Released: 1993
- Genre: Rock
- Length: 49:22

Zebda chronology
L'arène des rumeurs (1992)	Le bruit et l'odeur (1993)	Essence ordinaire (1998)

Le bruit et l'odeur (French pronunciation: [lə.bʁɥi.e.lɔ.dœʁ]) is the second studio album by the French rock group Zebda, released in 1995.

With this album, the group confirmed its social focus by adding engaging samples to its guitar-driven music. The album title is a reference to a controversial statement made during a speech given in 1991 by the mayor of Paris and later French president Jacques Chirac (known as Le bruit et l'odeur) which was not easily forgotten by many. This album explores how far life in France at the end of the 20th century has come, especially in the south.

== Track listing ==
1. Toulouse - 3'48"
2. Taslima - 3'07"
3. La Faucille et le Marteau - 2'53"
4. Le Bruit et l'Odeur - 4'57"
5. La Bête (J-M-L-P) - 3'30"
6. France 2 - 4'31"
7. Maanouche - 0'20"
8. Le Bilan - 3'06"
9. Chomage - 2'31"
10. Mon père m'a dit - 3'56"
11. Matabiau - 2'52"
12. Dub du village - 0'40"
13. Ma rue - 3'33"
14. Basket Bolk - 0'18"
15. Cameroun - 2'16"
16. Héréditaire - 4'23"
17. France dub - 2'41"
