= Essence ordinaire =

Studio album by Zebda
- Released: 10 September 1998
- Recorded: 1998
- Genre: Rock
- Length: 57:04
- Label: Barclay
- Producer: Zebda, Nick Sansano

Zebda chronology
| Le bruit et l'odeur (1995) | Essence ordinaire (1998) | Utopie d'Occase (2002) |

Essence ordinaire (pronounced [esɑ̃s ɔʁdinɛʁ]) is the third studio album by French rock band Zebda, released in 1998.

It was their landmark album, containing some of their most popular songs, in particular "Tomber la chemise", which catapulted them to fame and earned them a Victoire de la musique award.

== Track listing ==
1. "Y'a pas d'arrangement"
2. "Tomber la chemise"
3. "Double peine"
4. "Tombés des nues"
5. "Quinze ans"
6. "Je crois que ça va pas être possible"
7. "Je suis"
8. "Tout semble si..."
9. "On est chez nous"
10. "Oualalaradime"
11. "Le manouche"
12. "Né dans la rue"
13. "Le Petit Robert"
