= L'arène des rumeurs =

Studio album by Zebda
- Released: 1992
- Recorded: 1992
- Genre: Rock
- Label: Barclay
- Producer: Zebda

Zebda chronology
Zebdomania (1989)	L'arène des rumeurs (1992)	Le bruit et l'odeur (1995)

L'Arène des rumeurs is the first album of the French rock group Zebda, released in 1992.

== Liste des titres ==
1. Arabadub
2. Baudis
3. Mala diural
4. Minot des minorités
5. CNN
6. Singing
7. Le Masque au rade
8. La Bague à Danièle
9. Le Miroir
10. La France
11. Mala diural (À la Skabyle)
12. Baïonettes
13. D'Ève à Lise
