= Emissary =

Emissary may refer to:

== Arts and entertainment ==
=== Star Trek ===
- Benjamin Sisko, the Emissary of the Prophets, the Bajorans' gods
- "Emissary" (Star Trek: Deep Space Nine), the pilot episode of Star Trek: Deep Space Nine
- "The Emissary" (Star Trek: The Next Generation), a second-season episode of Star Trek: The Next Generation

=== Other arts and entertainment ===
- Emissaries (album), a 2006 album by black metal group Melechesh
- The Emissary (TV series), 1982 Hong Kong TV series
- The Emissary (film), a 1989 South African thriller film
- The Emissary, the US title of the Yoko Tawada novel The Last Children of Tokyo

== Other uses ==
- Emissary (hydraulics), a channel by which an outlet is formed to carry off any stagnant body of water
- Emissary (Internet Software), an early Internet suite

== See also ==
- Emissary veins, in anatomy, valveless veins which normally drain the intracranial venous sinuses to veins on the outside of the skull
- Ambassador
- Apostle (disambiguation)
- Diplomat
