= Utopie d'Occase =

Studio album by Zebda
- Released: 2002
- Recorded: 2002
- Genre: Rock
- Length: 62:16
- Label: La Tawa
- Producer: Zebda/Nicholas Sansano

Zebda chronology
Essence ordinaire (1998)	Utopie d'Occase (2002)	La Tawa (2003)

Utopie d'Occase is the fourth studio album by French rock group Zebda. It was released in 2002 and produced by Zebda and Nicholas Sansano. After the success the band met with its previous album, Essence ordinaire, and especially with the song "Tomber la chemise", it feared it would be turned into a commercial band and so decided to put more focus on the lyrics in this album while still keeping the same music that the fans were used to. In Utopie d'occase the songs, written as usual by Magyd Cherfi, evoke such themes as immigration, racism, violence, poverty and social injustice.

== Track listing ==
No.	Title	Length
1.	"L'erreur est humaine"	4:30
2.	"J'y suis j'y reste"	5:04
3.	"Le plus beau"	4:05
4.	"Du soleil à la toque"	4:08
5.	"Mêlée ouverte"	5:14
6.	"Sheitan"	3:53
7.	"Ca... la famille"	4:42
8.	"La fête"	3:07
9.	"Troisième degré"	5:42
10.	"Goota ma différence"	3:33
11.	"Le bonhomme derrière"	2:18
12.	"Le paranoïaque"	2:56
13.	"Le répertoire"	13:04
