= Emissary (internet software) =

Internet application suite

- Developer: Attachmate/The Wollongong Group
- Initial release: 1995
- Final release: 2.0 / August 28, 1996
- Operating system: Windows 3.x, 95, 98, NT 3.5/NT 3.51
- Available in: English
- Type: Internet Suite
- License: Proprietary
- Website: Homepage at the Wayback Machine (archived October 29, 1996)

Emissary was a popular early commercial internet suite from Attachmate for Windows. It featured a web browser, FTP support, e-mail program, a newsreader program, and an HTML editor.

Though once considered a popular internet suite, it fell out of favor after Internet Explorer 3 was released. Development was abandoned following the Microsoft antitrust case.

== Releases ==
The following are releases of Emissary 1.x:

- Emissary 1.0
- Emissary 1.1

== Emissary 2.0 ==
Emissary 2.0 was a collection of six applications:

- File Management - An FTP client
- Host Access - Remote access via TELNET
- Mail - An email client with POP3 and SMTP support as well as an address book
- News - A newsgroup reader
- Web Surfing - An HTML 3 web browser
- Hypertext editor - A WYSIWYG HTML editor

Each of these applications ran within Emissary and had its own helpfile.

=== Features ===
Emissary 2.0 had the following features:

- the ability to e-mail web pages or hot links
- HTML3 support
- HTML forms support
- URIs supported: FTP/Anonymous FTP, Telnet, Mailto, News groups, HTTP, Gopher, Finger protocol
- Netscape/Internet Explorer extension/plugin support
- WYSIWYG HTML Editor
- View/edit source of a web page
- vCalanader/vCard support
- A favorites toolbar via "Custom Agent"
- View header response in "Document Info"
- History via "Places Visited"
- Document history
- Page text search/replace
- Page magnification
- HTTPS/site certificates
- Ability to save/load history via "History Lists" (.whl)
- Ability to ROT13 a webpage
- Proxy support (http & https)
- SOCKS support
- DNS Query
- Help file with tips
- Network drives support
- Drag-and-drop support
- Navigation: Back, Forward, Refresh
- Ability to print webpages (no print preview)
- Page auto-refresh via "Auto-play" in "Places Visited"
- Plugins: Shockwave (Director 4.0.4), INSO Word Viewer
- Themes: business, entertainment, kids, default
- 200+ page printed Emissary User Guide
- Spell checking support via the Sentry-Spell Checking Engine
- Encode/decode Base64, quotable-printable, uuencode of text, binary, and clipboard files
- The following file types were supported: address book (.adr), MCI video (.avi, .mov), vCard (.vdf), mail/news (.wod), Macromedia Director (.dir, .dcr, .dxr), word documents (.doc), hypertext (.htm, .html, .shtml), gopher directory (.gom), text (.txt,. text, .htm), images (.gif, .jpg, .jpeg, .bmp, .xbm, .ico), sound (.wav, .au, .snd, .voc, .aif)

=== Technical ===
Web pages created with Emissary had the following meta tag:

<META NAME="GENERATOR" CONTENT="Emissary 2.0">

Emails sent with Emissary had the following X-Mailer Header: X-Mailer: Emissary V2.00, by Attachmate Corp.

=== Releases ===
- Emissary 2.0 Public Beta
- Emissary 2.0 Public BETA 1
- Emissary 2.0 beta 1
- Emissary 2.0 beta 2
- Emissary 2.0 beta 3
- Emissary 2.0 beta 4
- Emissary 2.0 International Evaluation
- Emissary 2.0 Desktop Edition
- Emissary Version 2.0 Official Release [90-day evaluation]

=== System requirements ===
Emissary 2.0 has the following system requirements:

- Processor: An IBM PC 80486 or higher
- Ram: 8 MB of RAM
- Hard drive space: 15 MB to 25 MB free hard drive space
- Driver: WinSock v1.1-compliant TCP/IP stack.
- Network: an ODI or NDIS-compatible network card (for intranet use)
- Modem: 28.8 kbit/s or faster modem (for internet use)

== Reception ==
The internet suite was well received.

== Editions ==
The following are the editions that were sold:

Edition	Release date	Price	Medium	Developers
Emissary 1.1	1996	?	?	The Wollongong Group Inc., Attachmate Internet Products Group
Emissary 2.0 Desktop Edition	1996	US$149	Diskettes	Attachmate
Emissary 2.0 Office Edition	1996	about US$400	Diskettes	Attachmate
