= Zebda =

French band

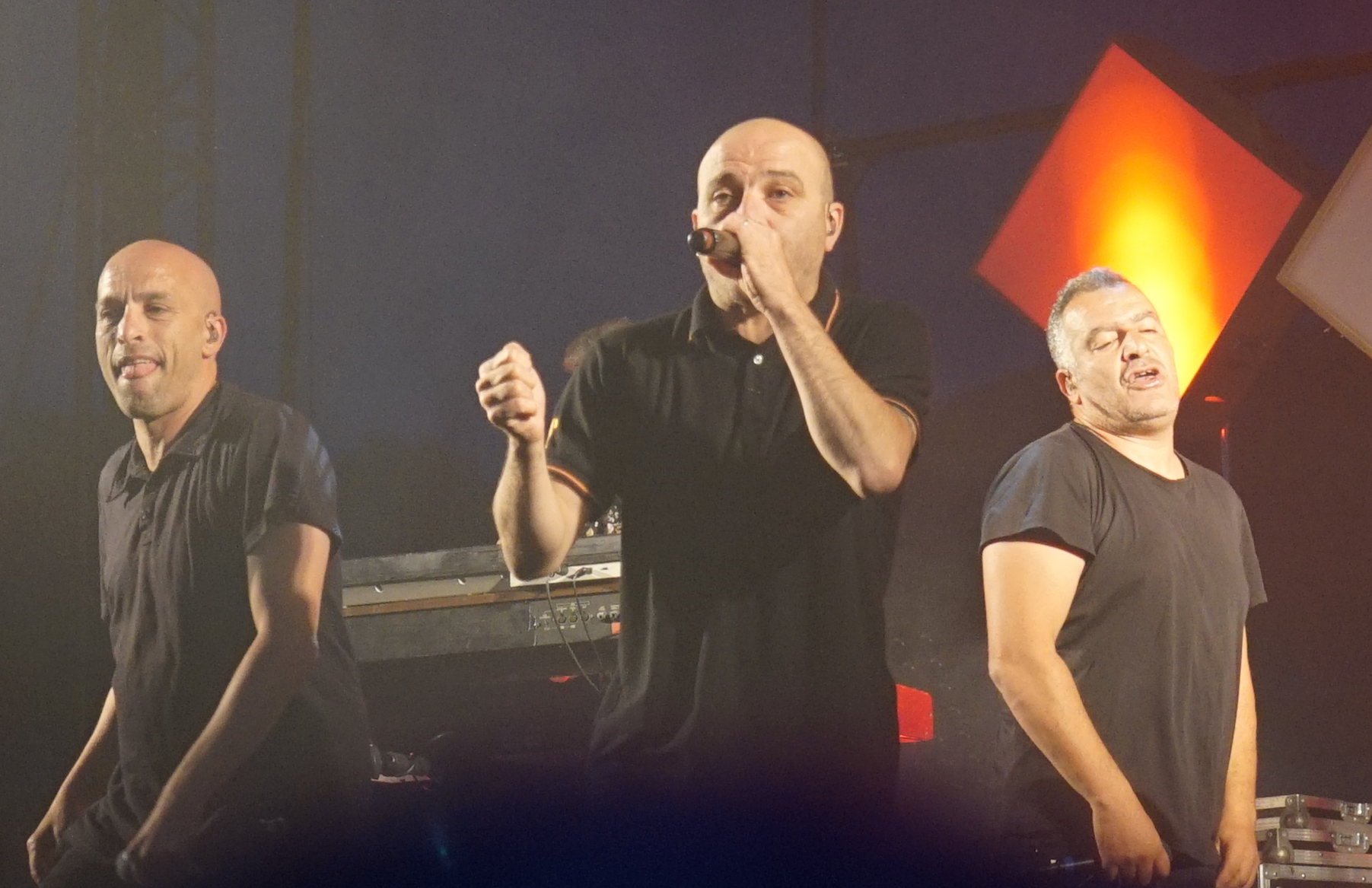
- Zebda performing live in Laon, Hauts-de-France, in 2015

Background information
- Origin: Toulouse, Occitania, France
- Genres: Pop rock; reggae
- Years active: 1985–2003; 2011–present
- Label: Barclay
- Members: Magyd Cherfi; Joël Saurin; Hakim Amokrane; Mustapha Amokrane; Vincent Sauvage; Rémi Sanchez

Zebda (French pronunciation: [zɛbda]; from Arabic: زبدة, zubda, [zubda], lit. 'butter') is a French band from Toulouse, known for its political activism and its wide variety of musical styles. The group, which was formed in 1985, consisted of seven musicians of diverse nationalities, and the themes of much of their music involved political and social justice, the status of immigrants and minorities in France, and the inhabitants of the French banlieues, or suburbs. Zebda earned widespread recognition, as well as several awards, for its 1998 single "Tomber la chemise" ("Taking Off Shirt"). In 2001, the band spearheaded an independent political party that won over 12% of the first-round vote in Toulouse's municipal elections. The band was disbanded in 2003 but reformed in 2011.

== History ==
Zebda was first formed in 1985 when Magyd Cherfi, a community organizer at the time, organized a small group of his musician friends to shoot a video for a community organization for which he was working. More members joined the group later—several of the members met one another through involvement in community projects geared towards supporting arts and music involvement among Toulouse youth. The group began performing together regularly in 1988. The band gained widespread recognition when they performed at the Printemps de Bourges music festival in 1990 and then performed on an international tour which included venues in Great Britain, Italy and France.

The group released its first album, L'arène des rumeurs, in 1992, under the label of Barclay Records. As the band toured and performed, the members continued to be active in community work, and Zebda became known for its politicized lyrics. Its 1995 album, Le bruit et l'odeur ("The Noise and the Smell") took its name from a gaffe made by then-president Jacques Chirac in reference to the conditions in the French banlieues, many of which have large immigrant populations. The record itself had a strong critical and commercial reception and has been said to have "cause[d] a major stir" in France.

In 2003, Zebda released its only live album, La Tawa, after which the band split up.

The group reformed in 2011 and toured France. A new album, Second tour, was released in January 2012.

=== Political involvement ===
Zebda (زبدة, transliterated Zubda or Zabda), the Arabic word for butter (beurre in French), is a play on the word beur, a French slang word referring to French citizens of North African origin—several of the group's members are of North African and other immigrant descent. As Zebda was originally formed for a community organization and many of the members met through social initiatives and activism, the band remained highly political throughout its existence. Bruce Crumley of the Culture Kiosque has called the group "politically engaged and culturally committed" and "politically progressive." Much of the group's music and lyrics have centered on issues of political and social justice among the immigrant community and inhabitants of the banlieues. Bangor University's Jonathan Ervine, in a deconstructive analysis of Zebda's music and identity, states that "Zebda's music invokes both the virtues of multiculturalism and the problems that exist within French society regarding the treatment of immigrants, ethnic minorities, and young people from France's banlieues. Difference, discrimination, and exclusion are themes that feature heavily in J'y suis, j'y reste [a song from the album Utopie d'occase]." The themes of Zebda's music were known for dealing with issues of racism and intolerance.

In 1997, three members of Zebda formed a group called "Tactikollectif," which was involved in fund-raising and advocacy for immigrant groups in the banlieues. In the 2001 municipal elections, Zebda sponsored and spearheaded a list of independent candidates, Les Motivé-e-s ("The Motivated Ones"), who ran for office on the platform that the current local government was not representative of all demographic groups in the city. Les Motivé-e-s was also dedicated to encouraging local youth and immigrants to vote and become more involved in local political issues. The group of candidates, two of whom were Zebda band members, won 12.38% of the vote in the first-round elections, and advanced to the second round, where they were narrowly defeated.

After the band's breakup in 2003, the individual members continued to be active in local politics and other activities for social advocacy.

== Musical style ==
Zebda's music is influenced by its band members' multicultural background as well as music from all over the world. The group's songs have incorporated rock, and reggae styles, and musical instruments and styles as diverse as Latin music, Arab, and French accordion. While the content and themes of their music are politically serious, typically detailing racism and discrimination, the group has been said to have a positive and "upbeat" sound that represents the ideal of peaceful coexistence and cultural diversity.

The group is best known for its single "Tomber la chemise" ("Take Off Your Shirt"), from the 1998 platinum album Essence ordinaire. In addition to being a commercial success, the song went on to be named the best French song of 2000 at both the Victoires de la musique awards and the NRJ Music Awards.

=== Awards ===
- Victoires de la musique:
  - Best band (2000)
  - Best song (2000), for "Tomber la chemise"
- NRJ Music Awards:
  - Francophone song of the year (2000), for "Tomber la chemise"
  - Francophone band of the year (2000)

== Discography ==
=== Albums ===
Year	Album	Peak positions			Certification
Year	Album	FR	BEL (Wa)	SWI	Certification
1992	L'arène des rumeurs	–	–	–	
1995	Le bruit et l'odeur	–	–	–	
1998	Essence ordinaire	3	–	–	
1999	Le bruit et l'odeur (re-release)	54	–	–	
2002	Utopie d'Occase	3	36	36	
2012	Second Tour	4	–	–	
2014	Comme des Cherokees	22	81	–	

Live albums

Year	Album	Peak positions	Certification
Year	Album	FR	Certification
2003	La Tawa (live)	40	
2012	Plan d'occupation du sol (compilation from live shows)	127	

=== Singles ===
- 1999: "Tomber la chemise"
- 1999: "Y'a pas d'arrangement"
- 2000: "Oualalaradime"
- 2002: "L'erreur est humaine"
