= Jean-Jacques Goldman discography =

- Studio albums: 7
- Soundtrack albums: 2
- Live albums: 4
- Compilation albums: 2
- Singles: 46
- Video albums: 9
- Collaborative singles: 32
- Collaborative albums: 10
- Box sets: 10

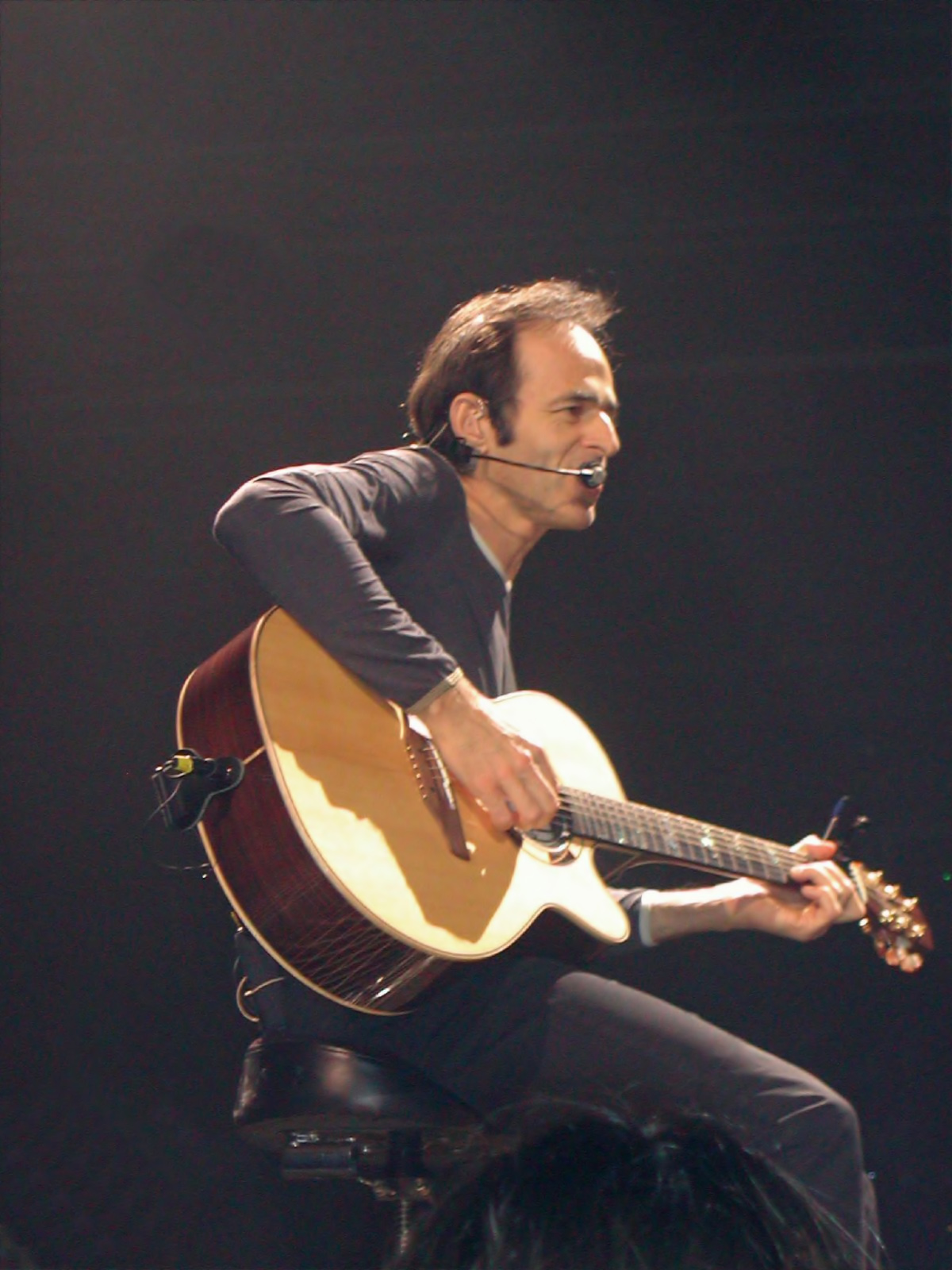
Jean-Jacques Goldman

This is the discography of French singer-songwriter Jean-Jacques Goldman, including his work as a solo artist and as part of Taï Phong and Fredericks Goldman Jones. For his work with the charity group Les Enfoirés, with whom he recorded 26 albums, see Les Enfoirés § Discography.

== Solo albums ==
=== Studio albums ===
Title	Album details	Peak chart positions					Certifications
Title	Album details	FRA	BE (FLA)	BE (WA)	QUE	SWI	Certifications
Jean-Jacques Goldman (a.k.a. Démodé)	Released: 4 September 1981; Label: Epic; Formats: LP, MC	—	—	—	—	—	FR: Platinum
Jean-Jacques Goldman (a.k.a. Minoritaire)	Released: October 1982; Label: Epic; Formats: LP, MC	3	—	—	—	—	FR: 3xPlatinum; SWI: Gold
Positif	Released: January 1984; Label: Epic; Formats: LP, MC	3	—	—	—	—	FR: Diamond
Non homologué	Released: 13 September 1985; Label: Epic; Formats: CD, LP, MC	1	—	—	15	—	FR: Diamond
Entre gris clair et gris foncé	Released: 5 November 1987; Label: Epic; Formats: CD, 2xLP, 2xMC	1	—	106 (Note: Chart position from 2021)	39	—	FR: Diamond; SWI: Platinum
En passant	Released: 26 August 1997; Label: Columbia; Formats: CD, MC	1	38	1	15	10	FR: Diamond; BE: Platinum; SWI: Platinum
Chansons pour les pieds	Released: 20 November 2001; Label: Columbia; Formats: CD, MC	1	—	1	—	2	FR: Diamond; BE: Platinum; SWI: Platinum
"—" denotes releases that did not chart or were not released in that territory.

=== Live albums ===
Title	Album details	Peak chart positions				Certifications
Title	Album details	FRA	BE (WA)	QUE	SWI	Certifications
En public	Released: October 1986; Label: Epic; Formats: 2xCD, 2xLP, MC	2	—	41	—	FR: 3xPlatinum; SWI: Gold
Traces	Released: 13 March 1989; Label: Epic; Formats: CD, 2xLP, MC	1	—	—	30	FR: Platinum
Tournée 98 En passant	Released: 15 June 1999; Label: Columbia; Formats: 2xCD, 2xMC	1	1	—	—	FR: Platinum
Un tour ensemble	Released: 3 June 2003; Label: Columbia; Formats: 2xCD, MC	1	1	—	7	FR: Platinum; BE: Gold
"—" denotes releases that did not chart or were not released in that territory.

=== Soundtrack albums ===
Title	Album details
Musique du film L'Union sacrée	Released: 1989; Label: Polydor; Formats: CD, LP, MC; With Roland Romanelli
Astérix et Obélix contre César	Released: February 1999; Label: Columbia; Formats: CD, MC; With Roland Romanelli

=== Compilation albums ===
Title	Album details	Peak chart positions				Certifications
Title	Album details	FRA	BE (FLA)	BE (WA)	SWI	Certifications
Quelques choses bizarres – 81–91	Released: 22 November 1991; Label: Columbia; Formats: CD	—	197	46	—	
Singulier 81/89	Released: 23 August 1996; Label: Columbia; Formats: 2xCD, 2xMC	1	14	1	79	FR: Diamond; BE: Platinum; SWI: Gold
"—" denotes releases that did not chart or were not released in that territory.

=== Box sets ===
Title	Album details	Peak chart positions		Certifications
Title	Album details	FRA	BE (WA)	Certifications
Goldman – Coffret intégrale 1981–1987	Released: 1989; Label: CBS; Formats: 7xCD	—	—	
Jean-Jacques Goldman	Released: 1991; Label: Columbia, Epic; Formats: 3xCD	—	—	
L'Intégrale 81–91	Released: 25 November 1991; Label: Columbia; Formats: 8xCD	—	—	
Quand la musique est bonne / Non homologué / Positif	Released: November 1994; Label: Sony Music; Formats: 3xCD	44	—	FR: Gold
Intégrale 1990/2000	Released: 23 October 2000; Label: Columbia; Formats: 8xCD	—	—	
Non homologué / Positif	Released: May 2003; Label: Sony Music; Formats: 2xCD	189	—	
81–89 La Collection	Released: 17 November 2008; Label: Sony BMG; Formats: 6xCD	113	93	
La Collection – 1990/2001	Released: 19 November 2012; Label: Legacy; Formats: 4xCD+DVD	74	76	
Positif / Non homologué	Released: 14 August 2015; Label: Sony Music; Formats: 2xCD	115	—	
Quand la musique est bonne / A l'envers	Released: 12 August 2016; Label: Sony Music; Formats: 2xCD	—	—	
"—" denotes releases that did not chart or were not released in that territory.

=== Video albums ===
Title	Details
Carnet De Route 1981 à 1986	Released: 1987; Label: CBS; Formats: VHS
Traces	Released: 1989; Label: CBS; Formats: LaserDisc
Videoclips 1981/1989	Released: 1989; Label: CBS; Formats: CD-V
Tournée 98 En passant	Released: 14 June 1999; Label: Columbia, Sony Music; Formats: DVD, VHS
Souvenirs de tournées	Released: November 2000; Label: Sony Music; Formats: DVD
Intégrale des clips 1981/2000	Released: November 2000; Label: Sony Music; Formats: 2xDVD
Chronique d'un album	Released: 2001; Label: Columbia; Formats: DVD; Limited-only release
Et l'on n'y peut rien	Released: 2 June 2003; Label: Columbia; Formats: DVD
Un tour ensemble	Released: November 2003; Label: Columbia; Formats: 2xDVD

== Collaborative albums ==
=== With Taï Phong ===
Title	Album details
Taï Phong	Released: June 1975; Label: Warner Bros.; Formats: LP, MC
Windows	Released: October 1976; Label: Warner Bros.; Formats: LP, MC
Last Flight	Released: August 1979; Label: Warner Bros.; Formats: LP
Les années Warner	Released: 21 December 1984; Label: Warner Bros.; Formats: CD, LP, MC; Split compilation album with Goldman solo songs

=== With Fredericks Goldman Jones ===
Title	Album details	Peak chart positions						Certifications
Title	Album details	FRA	BE (FLA)	BE (WA)	NL	QUE	SWI	Certifications
Fredericks Goldman Jones	Released: 28 November 1990; Label: CBS; Formats: CD, LP, MC	1	—	—	76	31	—	FR: Diamond; SWI: Platinum
Un, deux, trois 89–90	Released: 1991; Label: Columbia; Formats: CD; Compilation album; Includes 2 Goldman solo songs	—	—	—	—	—	—	
Sur scène	Released: 26 November 1992; Label: Columbia; Formats: CD, MC; Live album	1	—	—	—	—	—	FR: 2xPlatinum
Rouge	Released: 29 November 1993; Label: Columbia; Formats: CD, MC	1	—	—	—	—	41	FR: Diamond; SWI: Gold
Du New Morning au Zénith	Released: 18 May 1995; Label: Columbia; Formats: 2xCD, 2xMC; Live album	2	31	2	—	—	—	FR: Platinum; BE: Gold
Pluriel 90/96	Released: 11 September 2000; Label: Columbia; Formats: CD, MC; Compilation album	—	—	5	—	—	51	FR: 2xGold
"—" denotes releases that did not chart or were not released in that territory.

== Singles ==
Single	Year	Peak chart positions				Certifications	Album
Single	Year	FRA	BE (WA)	QUE	SWI	Certifications	Album
"Negro Spirituals" (as part of the Red Mountain Gospellers)	1966	—	—	—	—		Non-album singles
"C'est pas grave papa"	1976	—	—	—	—		Non-album singles
"Les nuits de solitude"	1977	—	—	—	—		Non-album singles
"Back to the City Again"	1978	—	—	—	—		Non-album singles
"Slow Me Again" (as Sweet Memories)	1978	—	—	—	—		Non-album singles
"High Fly" (as First Prayer)	1980	—	—	—	—		Non-album singles
"Il suffira (d'un signe)"	1981	7	—	—	—		Démodé
"Quelque chose de bizarre"	1982	—	—	—	—		Démodé
"Quand la musique est bonne"	1982	1	—	43	—	FR: Gold	Minoritaire
"Comme toi"	1983	4	—	—	—	FR: Gold	Minoritaire
"Au bout de mes rêves"	1983	10	—	8	—		Minoritaire
"Envole-moi"	1984	5	—	—	—	FR: Gold	Positif
"Encore un matin"	1984	8	—	—	—		Positif
"Plus fort" (Quebec-only release)	1984	—	—	—	—		Positif
"Long Is the Road (Americain)"	1984	6	—	—	—		Positif
"Je marche seul"	1985	2	—	14	—	FR: Gold	Non homologué
"Je te donne" (with Michael Jones)	1985	1	—	4	—	FR: Platinum	Non homologué
"Compte pas sur moi" (Quebec-only release)	1986	—	—	18	—		Non homologué
"Pas toi"	1986	5	—	9	—	FR: Silver	Non homologué
"La vie par procuration" (en public)	1986	2	—	7	—	FR: Gold	En public
"Medley" (en public)	1987	—	—	—	—		En public
"Elle a fait un bébé toute seule"	1987	4	—	28	—	FR: Silver	Entre gris clair et gris foncé
"Là-bas" (with Sirima)	1987	2	—	4	—	FR: Gold	Entre gris clair et gris foncé
"C'est ta chance"	1988	16	—	4	—		Entre gris clair et gris foncé
"Fais des bébés" (Quebec-only release)	1988	—	—	—	—		Entre gris clair et gris foncé
"Puisque tu pars"	1988	3	—	—	—	FR: Silver	Entre gris clair et gris foncé
"Il changeait la vie" (live)	1988	14	—	—	—		Traces
"Peur de rien blues" (live)	1989	17	—	—	—		Traces
"Elle attend" (promo-only release)	1996	—	—	—	—		Singulier 81/89
"Tout était dit" (promo-only release)	1997	—	—	—	—		En passant
"Sache que je"	1997	19	18	—	—		En passant
"On ira"	1997	—	—	42	—		En passant
"Quand tu danses"	1998	66	—	—	—		En passant
"Le coureur"	1998	—	—	—	—		En passant
"Bonne idée"	1998	68	—	2	—		En passant
"Nos mains" (live)	1999	—	—	46	—		Tournée 1998 En passant
"Bélénos" (promo-only release; remix)	1999	—	—	—	—		Astérix et Obélix contre César
"Elle ne me voit pas" (promo-only release)	1999	—	—	—	—		Astérix et Obélix contre César
"Pas toi" (promo-only release; live)	1999	—	—	—	—		Tournée 1998 En passant
"Le rapt" (promo-only release; live)	1999	—	—	—	—		Tournée 1998 En passant
"Ensemble" (promo-only release)	2001	—	—	—	—		Chansons pour les pieds
"Tournent les violons" (promo-only release)	2002	—	—	—	—		Chansons pour les pieds
"Les choses" (promo-only release)	2002	—	—	—	—		Chansons pour les pieds
"Je voudrais vous revoir" (promo-only release)	2002	—	—	—	—		Chansons pour les pieds
"Si je t'avais pas" (promo-only release)	2003	—	—	—	—		Chansons pour les pieds
"Et l'on n'y peut rien" (live)	2003	7	37	—	61		Un tour ensemble
"Envole-moi" (promo-only release; live)	2003	—	—	—	—		Un tour ensemble
"Petite fille" (promo-only release; live)	2003	—	—	—	—		Un tour ensemble
"4 mots sur un piano" (with Patrick Fiori and Christine Ricol)	2007	1	7	—	40	FR: Gold	Si on chantait plus fort (by Flori)
"La promesse" (with Grégoire)	2010	—	22	—	—		Le même soleil (by Grégoire)
"—" denotes releases that did not chart or were not released in that territory.

=== With Taï Phong ===
Single	Year	Peak chart positions		Albums
Single	Year	FRA	BE (WA)	Albums
"Sister Jane"	1975	20	25	Taï Phong
"(If You're Headed) North for Winter"	1975	—	—	Non-album single
"Games"	1976	—	—	Windows
"Follow Me"	1977	—	—	Non-album singles
"Back Again"	1978	—	—	Non-album singles
"Fed Up"	1979	—	—	Non-album singles
"Rise Above the Wind"	1979	—	—	Non-album singles
"I'm Your Son"	1986	—	—	Non-album singles
"—" denotes releases that did not chart or were not released in that territory.

=== With Fredericks Goldman Jones ===
Single	Year	Peak chart positions			Certifications	Album
Single	Year	FRA	NL	QUE	Certifications	Album
"Nuit"	1990	6	30	2	FR: Silver	Fredericks Goldman Jones
"À nos actes manqués"	1991	2	—	1	FR: Silver	Fredericks Goldman Jones
"Né en 17 à Leidenstadt"	1991	11	—	45		Fredericks Goldman Jones
"C'est pas d'l'amour"	1991	11	—	31		Fredericks Goldman Jones
"Un, deux, trois"	1992	6	—	—		Fredericks Goldman Jones
"Tu manques"	1992	12	—	—		Fredericks Goldman Jones
"Il suffira d'un signe" (live)	1992	14	—	—		Sur scène
"Je commence demain" (live)	1993	—	—	—		Sur scène
"Rouge"	1993	18	—	—		Rouge
"Just après"	1993	32	—	18		Rouge
"Des vies"	1994	—	—	—		Rouge
"Fermer les yeux"	1994	33	—	—		Rouge
"Pas toi" (promo-only release; live)	1995	—	—	—		Du New Morning au Zénith
"Peurs" (promo-only release)	2000	—	—	—		Pluriel 90/96
"—" denotes releases that did not chart or were not released in that territory.

=== Charity singles ===
Single	Year	Peak chart positions		Certifications	Album
Single	Year	FRA	BE (WA)	Certifications	Album
"Éthiopie" (as Chanteurs sans frontières)	1985	1	—	FR: Platinum	Non-album singles
"Dernier matin d'Asie" (as Sampan)	1987	22	—		Non-album singles
"Sa raison d'être" (as Ensemble; promo-only release)	1998	—	—		Ensemble
"Aux enfants de la Terre" (as les Enfants de la Terre; promo-only release)	2003	—	—		Les Enfants de la Terre
"Noël ensemble" (as 100 Artistes Ensemble contre le SIDA)	2003	3	4		Noël ensemble
"Agir réagir" (as Association Juste pour Eux)	2004	38	—		Non-album single
"—" denotes releases that did not chart or were not released in that territory.
