= Fredericks Goldman Jones (album) =

Studio album by Fredericks Goldman Jones
- Released: 28 November 1990
- Recorded: 1990: Studio ICP; Studio Guillaume Tell
- Genre: Synthpop, pop rock
- Label: CBS Disques
- Producer: Jean-Jacques Goldman, Erick Benzi

Fredericks Goldman Jones chronology
| Fredericks Goldman Jones (1990) | Sur scène (1992) |

Jean-Jacques Goldman chronology
| Traces (1989) | Fredericks Goldman Jones (1990) | Sur scène (1992) |

Singles from Fredericks Goldman Jones
- 1. "Nuit" Released: 1990; 2. "À nos actes manqués" Released: 1991; 3. "Né en 17 à Leidenstadt" Released: 1991; 4. "C'est pas l'amour" Released: 1991; 5. "Un, deux, trois" Released: 1991; 6. "Tu manques" Released: 1992

Professional ratings
Review scores
| Source | Rating |
|---|---|
| Allmusic | 2/5 stars |

Fredericks Goldman Jones is a 1990 album recorded by the trio Fredericks Goldman Jones. It was the trio's first studio album and was recorded at the studios ICP and Guillaume Tell, in Paris. The album was released on 28 November 1990 and spawned six singles which achieved success in France : "Nuit" (#6), "À nos actes manqués" (#2), "Né en 17 à Leidenstadt" (#11), "C'est pas l'amour" (#11), "Un, deux, trois" (#8) and "Tu manques" (#12). The album itself was successful : it debuted at number one on 4 January 1991 and stayed there for eight consecutive weeks. It was ranked for 51 weeks in the top ten and 87 weeks in the top 50. In 1991, it earned a Diamond disc for over 1,000,000 copies sold.

== Track listing ==
All tracks written and composed by Jean-Jacques Goldman.
All tracks performed by Carole Fredericks, Jean-Jacques Goldman and Michael Jones, except "Tu manques" (Goldman only).

1. "C'est pas d'l'amour" — 4:57
2. "Vivre cent vies" — 4:41
3. "Né en 17 à Leidenstadt" — 3:54
4. "Un, deux, trois" — 4:18
5. "Nuit" — 5:40
6. "Je l'aime aussi" — 6:14
7. "Chanson d'amour (...!)" — 4:07
8. "À nos actes manqués" — 4:42
9. "Peurs" — 4:58
10. "Tu manques" — 9:13

Source : Allmusic.

== Personnel ==
=== Fredericks Goldman Jones ===
- Carole Fredericks: Vocals, choirs and chorus
- Jean-Jacques Goldman: acoustic and electric guitars, vocals, piano, harmonica
- Michael Jones: acoustic and electric guitars, vocals, choir

=== Additional Personnel ===
- Nicole Amovin, Julia Fenere Sarr – choir, chorus
- Gildas Arzel – acoustic guitar, guitar
- Alain Aubert, John Hastry – engineer, mixing
- Georges Baux, Jean Louis Pujade, Andy Scott – producer
- Erick Benzi – synthesizer, keyboards
- Simon Clarke, Kick Horns, Roddy Lorimer, Neil Sidwell – brass
- Jean-Yves d'Angelo – piano
- Claude Gassian – photo
- Basil Leroux, Patrice Tison – guitar
- Pino Palladino – bass
- Gerald Manceau, Claude Salmieri – drums
- Tim Sanders – soprano saxophone, brass
- Paul Spong – trumpet, brass

== Certifications ==
| Region | Certification | Certified units/sales |
|---|---|---|
| France (SNEP) | Diamond | 1,000,000^{*} |
| Switzerland (IFPI Switzerland) | Platinum | 50,000^{^} |
^{*} Sales figures based on certification alone.^{^} Shipments figures based on certification alone.
