= Claude Le Péron =

French musician (1948–2020)

- Born: 2 February 1948
- Origin: Fontenay-sous-Bois, Val-de-Marne, France
- Died: 24 June 2020 (aged 72)
- Genres: Rock 'n' roll Rhythm and blues Blues rock Country rock
- Occupation: Bassist
- Instrument(s): Bass guitar, backing vocals
- Years active: 1967–2020

Claude Le Péron (2 February 1948 – 24 June 2020) was a French bass guitarist known for his collaboration with Jean-Jacques Goldman among other musicians.

== Biography ==
He started playing guitar in 1961, then started the bass guitar in 1964. Not knowing how to read music, he taught himself by listening to records. He was influenced by The Beatles, The Rolling Stones and other rock bands of the 60s. In 1964, he bought his first bass, a replica of Paul McCartney's bass. In 1967, like many artists, he passed through Club Med as a musician.

He moved to Nantes in 1969, where he played in local bands with musicians such as Jacky Mascarel, and Philippe Grandvoinet (New Direction). While there, he founded the group Nantais Zig-Zag with Jean-Luc Chevalier (Tri Yann). He also played in the Crystal Group. In 1977, along with Mascarel, Le Péron got to know bassists Laurent Voulzy and Alain Souchon.

He went on to record "Cœur Grenadine" and "Bopper en larmes" with Voulzy, in 1979 and 1983. In 1983 he made "Olympia 83" with Souchon and Jacky Mascarel.

It was during that year, 1983, that he crossed paths with Jean-Jacques Goldman, during the "Champs Élysées" show. Following the broadcast, Jean-Jacques Goldman decided to go on tour and needed a bassist who could sing. This led him to add Le Péron to his band. He and other Goldman band members worked with Michael Jones, drummer Jean-François Gautier and the Rhinos.

Le Péron toured with Goldman and collaborated on many of his albums from that time until Goldman's last tour in 2002. Since that time, he has toured with Michael Jones and in groups such as Les Rapalas and After The Rain.

== Discography ==
=== with Laurent Voulzy ===
- 1979 : Cœur Grenadine
- 1983 : Bopper en Larmes

=== with Alain Souchon ===
- 1983 : Olympia 83

=== with Jean-Jacques Goldman ===
- 1985 : Non homologué – Bass on "Je Te Donne"
- 1987 : Entre gris clair et gris foncé – Bass on "Peur De Rien Blues"
- 1986 : En Public
- 1989 : Traces
- 1991 : L'Intégrale 81/91
- 1992 : Sur Scène
- 1995 : Du New Morning au Zénith
- 1996 : Singulier 81/89
- 1999 : Tournée 1998 En Passant
- 2000 : L'Intégrale 90/00
- 2003 : Un Tour Ensemble
- 2008 : La collection 81–89

=== with Michael Jones ===
- 1997 : A consommer sans modération
