= Springfield (album) =

Studio album by Carole Fredericks
- Released: 1996 France, Belgium, Switzerland; 2002 United States
- Studio: Studio Davout, Paris; Right Track Recording, Manhattan, New York
- Genre: Gospel, Blues
- Label: JRG Editions Musicales/Fr
- Producer: Erick Benzi

Professional ratings
Review scores
Source	Rating
Tom Branson	not rated

Springfield is a 1996 album by Carole Fredericks. It features a cover of Edwin Hawkins’ "Oh Happy Day", the traditional "Silent Night", "You Had It Comin’", a duet with her brother blues musician Taj Mahal, and the pop single, "Run Away Love", which was the theme song to the 1998 Jean-Paul Belmondo film Une Chance Sur Deux.

The album was recorded in English and released in France, Belgium and Switzerland. The album was released in the United States in 2002. Springfield won Best Gospel Album, and singles from the album, "Shine" and "Save My Soul," took Best Gospel Song and Best Gospel Song 2nd Place in the 2004 JPF Music Awards. In the 2008 International Songwriting Competition, "Reason to Stay" won Honorable Mention in the Blues category, and "Shine" won Honorable Mention in the Gospel/Christian category.

== Track listing ==
The album contains the following tracks:

All lyrics composed by Carole Fredericks; all music written by Erick Benzi; except where noted

1. "Save My Soul"
2. "Reachin’" (music: Jacques Veneruso)
3. "You Had It Comin’" (music: Jacques Veneruso)
4. "Shine"
5. "Jesus in Me" (music: Jean-Jacques Goldman)
6. "Run Away Love" (music: Gildas Arzel)
7. "No Rain" (music: Christopher Satterfield)
8. "Change" (music: Jean-Jacques Goldman)
9. "Let Him Be Blues" (music: Jacques Veneruso)
10. "Reason to Stay" (music: Gildas Arzel)
11. "Tender Love" (music: Gildas Arzel)
12. "Oh Happy Day" (Edwin Hawkins)
13. "So I Pray" (Yvonne Jones)
14. "Silent Night" (Traditional; arranged by Erick Benzi)

== Personnel ==
The following personnel performed on the album:

- Carole Fredericks – vocals
- Taj Mahal – vocal, harmonica
- Charly Doll – drums, percussion
- David Bernadaux - drums
- Yannick Hardoium – bass
- Youssef Bouchou - bass
- Didier Mouret – organ, piano
- Jacques Veneruso – electric & acoustic guitar, dobro
- Gildas Arzel – electric & acoustic guitar, dobro
- Christopher Satterfield – guitars
- Bat’Brass – brass
- Thierry Durel – trombone
- Stéphane Baudet – trumpet, bugle
- Gilles Martin – alto, tenor and baritone saxophone
- Yvonne Jones, Carole Fredericks, Catherine Russell, Erick Benzi, Jacques Veneruso, Jean-Jacques Goldman, Connie Malone - harmony vocals
