= Traces (Jean-Jacques Goldman album) =

Live album by Jean-Jacques Goldman
- Released: 13 March 1989
- Recorded: March – December 1988, in Brazzaville, Kinshasa, Orange, Arènes de Nîmes, Lille, Forest National of Brussels
- Genre: Pop
- Length: 75:47
- Label: Epic
- Producer: Jean-Jacques Goldman, Marc Lumbroso, Andy Scott

Jean-Jacques Goldman chronology
Entre gris clair et gris foncé (1987)	Traces (1989)	Fredericks Goldman Jones (1990)

Singles from Traces
- 1. "Il changeait la vie" Released: 1988; 2. "Peur de rien blues" Released: 1989

Professional ratings
Review scores
Source	Rating
Allmusic	4/5 stars

Traces is a 1989 album recorded by French singer-songwriter Jean-Jacques Goldman. It was his second live album and his seventh album overall. It was recorded during the singer's tour 1988, between March and December, in various countries (France, Congo, Belgium). The album was released on 13 March 1989 and spawned two singles which achieved success in France : "Il changeait la vie" (#14), which preceded the album's release, and "Peur de rien blues" (#17). The album was successful on the French chart.

== Success ==
The album debuted at number two on 9 April 1989 and climbed to number one eight weeks later and stayed there for two consecutive weeks. It was ranked for 24 weeks in the top ten and for 36 weeks in the top 50. A few months after its release, it earned a Platinum disc for over 300,000 copies sold.

The album was briefly ranked on the Swiss Albums Chart, peaking at No. 30 on 30 April 1989.

== Track listing ==
All songs written, composed and performed by Goldman.

LP

1. "Famille" – 6:15
2. "Entre gris clair et gris foncé" – 7:13
3. "C'est ta chance" – 6:31
4. "Reprendre c'est voler" – 6:37
5. "Elle a fait un bébé toute seule" – 5:05
6. "Peur de rien blues" – 8:28
7. "À quoi tu sers ?" (intro) – 5:37
8. "Doux" – 4:01
9. "Long Is the Road (Américain)" – 6:21
10. "Il changeait la vie" – 4:25
11. "Il y a" – 3:39
12. "Medley" ("Je marche seul", "Quand la musique est bonne", "Au bout de mes rêves", "Il suffira d'un signe", "Envole-moi, "Encore un matin") – 9:18
13. "Puisque tu pars" – 8:58

== Personnel ==
- Alix Bailly – assistant engineer, assistant
- Philippe Cerboneschi, Antoine Dequi – mixing assistant, assistant
- Dominique Chaloub, Pete Craigie – engineer
- Claude Gassian – photo
- Jean-Jacques Goldman – arranger, producer
- Marc Lumbroso – producer
- Bernard Meynard, Christope Vareille – assistant
- Andy Scott – producer, engineer, mixing
