= Il suffira d'un signe =

1981 song by Jean-Jacques Goldman

Single by Jean-Jacques Goldman

from the album Démodé
- B-side: "Quel Exil"
- Released: September 1981
- Recorded: Summer 1981
- Genre: Pop rock
- Length: 4:20
- Label: Epic Records
- Songwriter: Jean-Jacques Goldman
- Producer: Steve Parker

Il suffira d'un signe is a song written, composed and performed by Jean-Jacques Goldman. It was released in September 1981 as the first single of his first studio album Démodé. It is the track that launched Goldman’s solo career.

== Background ==
In 1981, Jean-Jacques Goldman had already a full musical career. His discography was linked to the band Tai Phong, with whom he recorded 3 albums, followed by a first career solo try, which was a failure.

The song is a "hope hymn" according to Fabien Lecoeuvre, written at the end of the 1970s, inspired by the situation in Iran, requested by a producer who asked him to write songs for a young singer who took part in the TV program Le jeu de la chance. The song went unnoticed, but the producer Marc Lumbroso liked it, met with Jean-Jacques Goldman and got him to record a demo, which he sent to Epic, CBS's label for new talents. Jean-Jacques Goldman recorded then his first album, with "Il suffira d'un signe", which lasts a little less than 6 minutes.

== Release ==
At the beginning, the song did not do well on Hit RTL, where it entered the charts on 11 October 1981, the day of Goldman's 30th birthday, climbing 15 places in 18 weeks. However, Monique Le Marcis, director of RTL's programs, heard it and had the song played more often on the radio. "Il suffira d'un signe" managed to be a commercial success and became a #1 single on 9 May 1982 and became the song (the first of a long list of hits) that really launched Goldman’s solo career.

The album version lasts almost 6 minutes, whereas the radio edit lasts 4 minutes.

It is notable that on the album cover the song is called Il suffira d'un signe, but on the 7" vinyl's cover it is written Il suffira (d'un signe).

In 1992, Goldman reprised the song with Carole Fredericks and Michael Jones for the trio’s live album "Sur Scène". After that, this live version will be released at the end of 1992, where it will reach the 14th position at the Top 50.
