= Long Is the Road (Américain) =

Single by Jean-Jacques Goldman

from the album Positif
- B-side: "P'tit blues peinard"
- Released: October 1984
- Recorded: France
- Genre: New wave, synthpop, progressive rock
- Length: 4:46
- Label: Epic
- Songwriter(s): Jean-Jacques Goldman
- Producer(s): Jean-Jacques Goldman; Marc Lumbroso

Jean-Jacques Goldman singles chronology
"Encore un matin" (1984)	"Long Is the Road (Américain)" (1984)	"Je marche seul" (1985)

"Long Is the Road (Américain)" is the name of a 1984 song recorded by the French singer and songwriter Jean-Jacques Goldman. It was released in October 1984 as the third and last single from his album Positif, on which it features as the eighth track. The song was the first hit of Goldman on the French Singles Chart, reaching the top ten.

== Lyrics and music ==
Lyrics are mainly in French-language, but there are also many English words throughout the song.

"Long Is the Road (American)" begins with a mainly musical introduction in which Goldman chanted many "dam dam dam dam". Then the song starts and deals with the American Dream, seen in the first verse as authentic Eldorado, while the second verse refers to the disappointment towards the social inequalities and the difficulty to make one's fortune in the United States.

The refrains are very different from the couplets : very playful, they are built in the same way as negro spirituals. This gospel is "persevering but sometimes dull, sometimes bright of hope". The background vocals conclude the song by repeating many "A-mérican", after a tune played on saxophone by Supertramp saxophonist John Helliwell.

"Long Is the Road (Américain)" was performed on several of Goldman tours and was therefore included on the live albums En public, Traces and Tour souvenir. It also features on the compilations Intégrale and Singulier.

== Cover versions ==
The song was covered by Jean-Félix Lalanne in 1990, by Les Fous Chantants in 2000 on their album 1 000 Choristes rendent hommage à Jean-Jacques Goldman, and by Chimène Badi in 2007 for Les Enfoirés' album 2007: La caravane des Enfoirés.

It was performed by Patrick Fiori and Carole Fredericks on May 27, 2000, on the French TV show Tapis rouge.

== Chart performances ==
Although the singer had had other hits in France, including as "Quand la musique est bonne", "Encore un matin" or "Envole-moi", "Long Is the Road (Amériain)" was Goldman's first charting single in France, as the chart was only created in November 1984. The song entered it at number 31 on 11 November 1984, i.e. one week after the first edition of the chart. It reached the top ten in its tenth week and remained in it for six weeks, peaking at number six on 6 February 1985. Then it almost dropped on the chart and fell off the top 50 after 23 weeks.

A version in English was also recorded by Jean-Jacques Goldman under the title "USA (Long Is the Road)" and released in Portugal and Spain.

== Track listings ==
7" single

1. "Long Is the Road (Américain)" — 4:46
2. "P'tit blues peinard" — 3:33

12" maxi

1. "Long Is the Road (Américain) (extended version) — 7:27
2. "P'tit blues peinard" — 4:27

== Charts ==
Chart (1985)	Peak position
France (Airplay Chart [AM Stations])	1
France (SNEP)	6
