= Envole-moi =

1984 song by Jean-Jacques Goldman

Single by Jean-Jacques Goldman

from the album Positif
- Released: January 1984
- Recorded: December 1983
- Studio: Studio Gang, Paris
- Genre: Pop rock
- Length: 3:40
- Label: Epic
- Songwriter: Jean-Jacques Goldman
- Producers: Jean-Jacques Goldman, Marc Lumbroso

Jean-Jacques Goldman singles chronology
"Au bout de mes rêves" (1983)	"Envole-moi" (1984)	"Encore un matin" (1984)

Music video
- "Envole-moi" on YouTube

"Envole-moi" (pronounced [ɑ̃vɔl(ə) mwa]) is a song in French, composed and recorded by Jean-Jacques Goldman. The song is taken from Goldman's 1984 album Positif. The single sold for over half a million copies and was certified gold. Goldman explained that the song is a "cry for help" by a young man.

== Track list ==
1984

- Side A: "Envole-moi" (3:40)
- Side B: "Dors bébé, dors" (3:26)

== Interpretations ==
"Envole-moi" became the main song in the Jean-Jacques Goldman's repertoire during his 1986 tour. The live performance version of this song appeared in the album entitled, En public, released later in 1986 but with part of the original lyrics omitted.

In yet another live album released in 1989 entitled Traces, part of the song was interpreted by Goldman as part of a medley and introduced it after a "guitar duel" between Goldman, Michael Jones, and one of his partners in the musical collaboration Fredericks Goldman Jones.

In 1994, he came back to the song in the Fredericks Goldman Jones' album, Du New Morning au Zénith. This interpretation was a duo with Carole Fredericks. Other notable changes included addition of a guitar solo. The song starts with the ominous coming of a storm.

In 2003, Jean-Jacques Goldman recorded yet another version with Michael Jones on the Fredericks Goldman Jones live album of a concert at Zénith de Lille, entitled Un tour ensemble.

== Charts ==
=== Weekly charts ===
Chart (1984)	Peak position
France (IFOP)	5

Chart (2012)	Peak position
France (SNEP)	150

=== Year-end charts ===
Chart (1984)	Peak position
France (IFOP)	23

== Certifications ==
Region	Certification	Certified units/sales
France (SNEP)	Gold	500,000^{*}
^{*} Sales figures based on certification alone.

== Covers ==
"Envole-moi"

Single by Génération Goldman (M. Pokora & Tal)

from the album Génération Goldman
- Released: October 22, 2012
- Recorded: 2012
- Genre: Electropop, pop rock
- Length: 3:05
- Label: Warner Music
- Songwriter: Jean-Jacques Goldman

M. Pokora singles chronology
"Merci d'être" (2012)	"Envole-moi" (2012)	"Si tu pars" (2012)

Tal singles chronology
""Rien n'est parfait"" (2012)	""Envole-moi"" (2012)	""Danse"" (2012)

Music video
- "Envole-moi" on YouTube

The song has been subject to many covers.

=== Grégory Lemarchal version ===
A 2007 cover was done by Grégory Lemarchal and produced by Rémi Lacroix. It is found in his album La voix d'un ange. The album reached #1 on SNEP, French Albums Chart.

=== Almazian Symphony version ===
In 2012, the Almazian Symphony made an symphonic orchestra arrangement cover of "Envole-moi" with backing vocals choir, but without the main lyrics.

=== Génération Goldman (M. Pokora and Tal) version ===
In 2012, "Envole-moi" became the main release from the Génération Goldman project in which well-known French artists interpreted Jean-Jacques Goldman songs. It was pre-released by the project in October 2012 in preparation of a major launch of the compilation album on 19 November 2012. The album will include interpretations, amongst others, Pokora, Tal, ZAZ, Shym, Irma, Corneille, Amel Bent, Christophe Willem and others.

M. Pokora and Tal performed it live as a guest appearance in Danse avec les stars French series in season 3.

==== Charts ====
Chart (2012)	Peak position
Belgian Singles Chart (Wallonia)	7
SNEP French Singles Chart	5
Swiss Singles Chart	39
