= Un, deux, trois (disambiguation) =

Un, deux, trois, French for One, two three.

It may refer to:

- "Un, deux, trois", French entry in the Eurovision Song Contest 1976
- "Un, Deux, Trois" (Candies song)
- "Un, deux trois", song by Fredericks Goldman Jones from their album Fredericks Goldman Jones

See also

- Un, deux, trois, soleil, 1993 French comedy film directed by Bertrand Blier
- Un deux trois quatre! short title for 1-2-3-4 ou Les Collants noirs, English title Black Tights, 1961 French anthology film featuring four ballet segments
