= Tu manques =

Single by Carole Fredericks, Jean-Jacques Goldman and Michael Jones

from the album Fredericks Goldman Jones
- B-side: "Vivre cent vies"
- Released: May 1992
- Recorded: 1990
- Genre: Pop
- Length: 9:13
- Label: CBS
- Songwriter(s): Jean-Jacques Goldman
- Producer(s): Jean-Jacques Goldman, Erick Benzi

Carole Fredericks, Jean-Jacques Goldman and Michael Jones singles chronology
"Un, deux, trois" (1992)	"Tu manques" (1992)	"Il suffira d'un signe (live)" (1992)

"Tu manques" is a 1990 song recorded by Carole Fredericks, Jean-Jacques Goldman and Michael Jones. It was the sixth and last single from the album Fredericks Goldman Jones on which it appears as the last track and was released in May 1992. Although the three singers are credited on the single cover, only Goldman performed it. It was a top 15 hit in France.

== Music and lyrics ==
According to Goldman, "Tu manques" is a very "intimate song". Composed of three chords, the song was written very quickly during a night. It deals with the absence of a loved person and the painful consequences that this situation generates. The song is autobiographical and refers to Goldman's father who died at the time. In an interview by Nagui on RTL, the singer said that "Tu manques" would never be released as a single and never performed on stage (finally, the song came out, but it was actually never sung live).

According to an analysis, the "rhythm is slow", the "sentences are widely spaced", "there is a wide interval between two verses". "The singer's voice is special : it has a very low voice that shakes a lot, a mixture of sadness and emotion, which reinforces this tragical aspect". The various noises that can be heard in the musical introduction would represent the vacuum and the uncertainty as a result of the absence of the loved person. In a 2004 book entitled Chansons pour les yeux (a reference to Goldman's album Chansons pour les pieds), Cosey, a comic book author, gives his own interpretation of the song.

The album is also available on Goldman's compilation album Pluriel 90/96.

== Chart performance and cover versions ==
On 16 May 1992, the single went to number 28 on the French SNEP Singles Chart and reached a peak of number 12 two weeks later. Thereafter, it dropped and totaled nine weeks in the top 50.

In 1999, Florent Pagny covered the song on his cover album RéCréation.

== Track listings ==
CD single

No.	Title	Length
1.	"Tu manques" (radio edit)	6:03
2.	"Vivre cent vies"	4:18

CD maxi

No.	Title	Length
1.	"Tu manques" (extended radio edit)	8:39
2.	"Vivre cent vies"	4:22
3.	"Un, deux, trois" (remix)	5:35

Digital download (since 2005)

No.	Title	Length
1.	"Tu manques" (album version)	9:13

== Credits ==
- Bass: Pino Palladino
- Drum kit : Claude Salmieri
- Guitars: Basile Leroux and Patrice Tison
- Keyboards : Erick Benzi
- Piano and vocals : Goldman

== Charts ==
Chart (1992)	Peak position
French SNEP Singles Chart	12
