= Couleurs et Parfums =

Studio album by Carole Fredericks
- Released: 1999, Reissue released 2007
- Labels: JRG/M6 Interactions, BMG/Fr; CDF Music Legacy/USA
- Producers: Jacques Veneruso and Christophe Battaglia

Couleurs et parfums is a 1999 album by Carole Fredericks, an American-born singer most noted for her work in France, featuring a cover of Cyndi Lauper's "Time After Time" entitled "KAAI DJALLEMA" sung in Wolof and English. The album combines Fredericks' early experiences in the United States with the cultural influences of France. Couleurs et parfums was transformed into French lessons in 2003 and the album was reissued with the addition of one song, Veille, in 2007.

== Track listing ==
1. Qu’est-ce qui t’amène 3:52
2. J’ai le sang blues 3:52
3. Kaai Djallema/Time After Time 4:17
4. Respire 3:52
5. Le prix à payer 4:25
6. Mighty love 4:20
7. Au bout de mes rêves 3:26
8. Ecope 3:36
9. Personne ne saurait 3:44
10. Vain 4:16
11. Tu es là 4:12
12. Bonus Track: Veille 4:16

== Personnel ==
- Carole Fredericks – lead vocals, background vocals
- Poetic Lover – vocal duet Personne ne saurait
- Nicole Amovin – vocal duet ‘Kaai Djallema’
- Jacques Veneruso – guitar, background vocals
- Christophe Battaglia – claviers
- Didier Mouret – Fender Rhodes, piano
- Christophe Nègre – tenor sax
- Bernard Allison – guitar solo Vain and Veille (appears courtesy of RUF RECORDS)
- Cyril Tarquigny – electric guitar
- Emmanuel Nabajoth – guest vocalist
- Théo Allen – background vocals
- Jean-Jacques Goldman – background vocals
- Yvonne Jones – vocal duet Au bout de mes rêves, background vocals
- Maria Popkiewicz – background vocals
- Jacques Veneruso, Christophe Battaglia – Production and arrangements
- Letty M’Baye – adaptation of ‘Time After Time’ to Wolof
