= En passant tournée 1998 =

En Passant Tournée 1998

Live album by Jean-Jacques Goldman
- Released: 1999
- Recorded: 1998
- Genre: Pop
- Length: 116:58

Jean-Jacques Goldman chronology
En passant (1997)	En Passant Tournée 1998 (1999)	L'Intégrale 90/00 (2000)

En Passant - Tournée 1998 is a live album by French singer Jean-Jacques Goldman, recorded in 1998 and released in 1999. It was certified platinum in France for sales of 300,000 copies.

== Track listing ==
Disc 1

1. On ira
2. Bonne idée
3. La vie par procuration
4. Ne lui dis pas
5. Tout était dit
6. Elle attend
7. Le rapt
8. Pas toi
9. Elle a fait un bébé toute seule
10. Le coureur
11. Là-bas
12. Natacha
13. Quand tu danses
14. Jeanine médicament blues

Disc 2

1. À nos actes manqués
2. Nos mains
3. Je te donne
4. Peur de rien (blues)
5. Au bout de mes rêves
6. Il suffira d'un signe / Quand la musique est bonne
7. Sache que je
8. Pour que tu m'aimes encore
