= Né en 17 à Leidenstadt =

Single by Fredericks, Goldman, Jones

from the album Fredericks Goldman Jones
- B-side: "Tu manques"
- Released: July 1991
- Recorded: France
- Genre: Pop
- Length: 3:50
- Label: Columbia
- Songwriter(s): Jean-Jacques Goldman
- Producer(s): Jean-Jacques Goldman, Erick Benzi

Fredericks, Goldman, Jones singles chronology
"À nos actes manqués" (1991)	"Né en 17 à Leidenstadt" (1991)	"C'est pas l'amour" (1991)

"Né en 17 à Leidenstadt" (English: "Born in '17 in Leidenstadt") is a 1990 song written by Jean-Jacques Goldman for his group Fredericks Goldman Jones. It was the third single from their debut album, Fredericks Goldman Jones, and was released in July 1991. It has been performed twice by Goldman alone, and also by Goldman with Carole Fredericks and Michael Jones, each with a specific verse to sing. An English version exists in which Fredericks and Jones sing in their native language.

== Lyrics and music ==
In this song, the three singers are wondering if they would have acted differently if they had been in the situation of Germans after the 1918 defeat and during the rise of Nazism (stating that the composer, Jean-Jacques Goldman, had Polish and Jewish origins and that his mother is German), or in that of Northern Irish who were into civil war, or if they would show more solidarity with blacks if they were born as being white and rich in Johannesburg, South Africa.
Therefore, the song deals with the question on the topic of the choice and the position. It ends with the wish to never have to choose a camp.
'Leidenstadt' is an imaginary city whose name is composed of the German words das Leiden (the suffering) and die Stadt (the city). However, a town named 'Lydenburg' (same meaning in Afrikaans) does exist in South Africa.

According to Goldman, the song was very difficult to compose and record. The introduction, played on the piano, was inspired by Virginian artist Bruce Hornsby.

The song features as the third track on the 1990 album Fredericks Goldman Jones, and as the third track too on the 2000 best of Pluriel 90-96. In the English-speaking countries, the song was released in a bilingual version (French / English) entitled "Born in 1917 in Leidenstadt".

== Chart performances and cover versions ==
In France, the song charted for 16 weeks on the official single chart (top 50), from 6 July to 10 October 1991. It started at number 33 and reached a peak at number 11 in the eighth week. It then almost did not stop to drop on the chart and totaled nine weeks in the top 20. "Né en 17 à Leidenstadt" is the fourth most successful single of the trio, behind "Nuit", "À nos actes manqués" and "1,2,3".

The song was covered in 2000 by Michel Leclerc (instrumental version), and by Le Collège de l'Esterel in 2002.

== Track listings ==
- CD single
1. "Né en 17 à Leidenstadt" — 3:51
2. "Tu manques" — 6:03
- 7" single
1. "Né en 17 à Leidenstadt" — 3:51
2. "Tu manques" — 6:03
- Cassette
1. "Né en 17 à Leidenstadt" — 3:51
2. "Tu manques" — 6:03

== Charts ==
Chart (1991)	Peak position
Europe (European Airplay Top 50)	20
Europe (Eurochart Hot 100)	59
France (Airplay Chart [AM Stations])	1
France (SNEP)	11
Quebec (ADISQ)	45

== See also ==
- List of anti-war songs
