= Chansons pour les pieds =

Studio album by Jean-Jacques Goldman
- Released: 20 November 2001
- Recorded: Alès, 2001
- Genre: Pop, gigue, tarentelle, rock
- Label: Columbia

Jean-Jacques Goldman chronology
L'Intégrale 90/00 (2000)	Chansons pour les pieds (2001)	Pluriel 90/96 (2002)

Chansons pour les pieds is the seventh and final solo album by Jean-Jacques Goldman, released on 20 November 2001 and sung in French. The album was recorded at the Théâtre du Cratère d'Alès by Eric Van de Hel and Gildas Lointier, assisted by Renaud Van Welden. All songs were written by the singer himself. Released by JRG, the album met smash success on the charts : it topped the French and Belgian Albums Charts and remained charted for almost two years, and was #2 in Switzerland. As the title ("Songs for the Feet") suggests, all the tracks are devoted to dance and represent music styles (canon chorale, gigue, technoriental, slow, tarentelle, R&B, ballad, disco, rock, slow zouk, fanfare swing, pop).

There was a sole single from this album : "Et l'on y peut rien", which peaked at #7 in France, 37 in Belgium (Wallonia) and #61 in Switzerland.

== Track listing ==
1. "Ensemble" – 3:59
2. "Et l'on n'y peut rien" – 3:38
3. "Une poussière" – 5:33
4. "La Pluie" – 8:25
5. "Tournent les violons" – 4:38
6. "Un goût sur tes lèvres" – 4:29
7. "Si je t'avais pas" – 4:50
8. "C'est pas vrai" – 4:56
9. "The Quo's in Town Tonite" – 5:14
10. "Je voudrais vous revoir" – 5:12
11. "Les P'tits Chapeaux" – 3:54
12. "Les Choses" – 8:38
13. "La vie c'est mieux quand on est amoureux" ^{1}

^{1} Hidden track

Source : Allmusic.

== Personnel ==
Adapted from AllMusic.

- Gildas Arzel – guitar, mandocello, oud, primary artist, slide guitar
- Eric Benzi – arranger, engineer, programming, realization
- Francois Breugnot – violone
- Yvan Cassar – musical direction
- Gilles Chabenat – primary artist, vielle
- Marc Chantereau – percussion, primary artist
- Nicolas Duport – engineer
- Claude Gassian – photography
- Michel Gaucher – primary artist, trombone
- Jean-Jacques Goldman – primary artist, realization
- Alexis Grosbois – booklet design, coordination
- Christophe Guiot – concert master
- Didier Havet – euphonium, bass trombone
- Michael Jones – choeurs, guitar
- Raphaël Jonin – gravure
- Denis Leloup – primary artist, trombone
- Christian Lemaitre – violone
- Bruno LeRouzic – cornemuse, primary artist
- Gildas Lointier – advisor, engineer, sound recording
- Christian Martinez – primary artist, trumpet
- Eric Mula – primary artist
- Christophe Negre – director, flute, alto saxophone, soprano saxophone, tenor saxophone
- Fréderic Paris – flute
- Carlo Rizzo – primary artist, tambourine
- Phillipe Slominski – bugle, trumpet
- Jean-Pierre Solves – clarinet, piccolo, alto saxophone, baritone saxophone
- Patrice Tison – guitar effects, performer, primary artist
- Renaud Van Welden – assistant publisher

== Charts ==
Chart (2001–2003)	Peak position
Belgian (Wallonia) Albums Chart	1
French Albums Chart	1
Swiss Albums Chart	2

End of year chart (2001)	Position
Belgian (Wallonia) Albums Chart	21
French Albums Chart	2
End of year chart (2002)	Position
Belgian (Wallonia) Albums Chart	13
French Albums Chart	9

== Certifications ==
Country	Certification	Date	Sales certified
France	Diamond	13 February 2002	1,000,000
Switzerland	Platinum	2002	40,000

== Release history ==
Date	Label	Country	Format	Catalog
20 November 2001	Columbia	Belgium, France, Switzerland	CD	504735
11 December 2001	Sony	Belgium, France, Switzerland	CD	5047352
