= Nuit (song) =

Single by Fredericks, Goldman, Jones

from the album Fredericks Goldman Jones
- B-side: "Je l'aime aussi"
- Released: December 1990
- Recorded: France
- Genre: Pop rock
- Length: 5:39
- Label: CBS
- Songwriters: Jean-Jacques Goldman, Michael Jones
- Producers: Jean-Jacques Goldman, Erick Benzi

Fredericks, Goldman, Jones singles chronology
"Nuit" (1990)	"À nos actes manqués" (1991)

"Nuit" is a song recorded by the French trio Jean-Jacques Goldman, Carole Fredericks and Michael Jones. It was the first single from their debut album, Fredericks Goldman Jones, on which the song features as the fifth track. It achieved success in terms of sales in France.

== Background, lyrics and music ==
Goldman explained that "Nuit" was written in a very short time, i.e. just a few hours. He confessed that he was proud of this song, especially for its text. The music is inspired by Peter Green. The choice of "Nuit" as the first single from the album was difficult : the three singers did not agree initially, but ultimately chose this song, considering that it was very representative of the album which is "really based on vocals and guitars".

The song includes lyrics in French-language (written by Goldman) and in English-language (written by Jones and sung by Fredericks).

According to Elia Habib, a specialist of French charts, this song is characterized by its "sweetness and lucidity". It is "mainly based on percussion, shooting background framework, and the electric guitar, expressive soloist which plays the refrain". In the last verse, Goldman and Fredericks mix their voices singing in both languages (Goldman sings again the lyrics from the first verse). The song ends with a solo guitar.

The song is included on the best of Pluriel 90-96 and Intégrale 1990-2000, and on the live albums Sur scène and Un tour ensemble (on this last album, the song was performed by Jones and Goldman).

== Chart performance and cover versions ==
In France, "Nuit" charted for 19 weeks on the SNEP singles chart, from 18 December 1990 to 13 April 1991. It debuted at number 29 and reached the top ten three weeks later, where it remained for nine weeks, peaking at number six on 16 February. The single was certified Silver disc by the Syndicat National de l'Édition Phonographique. Although not released in the Netherlands, the United Kingdom and Spain (promotional vinyl only), it charted in the Netherlands, reaching number 30.

On the European Hot 100, "Nuit" debuted at number 72 on 22 December 1990, peaked at number 36 in its fifth week, and remained in the top 100 for 16 weeks. It was much aired on radio, starting at number 48 on the European Airplay Top 50 on 8 December 1990, reached number 15 in its sixth week and remained on the chart for 13 weeks.

In December 1998, the song was performed on the French TV show Hit Machine by the female duet Native and Patrick Fiori.

== Formats and track listings ==
- CD single
1. "Nuit" — 5:39
2. "Je l'aime aussi" — 5:07
- 7" single
1. "Nuit" — 5:39
2. "Je l'aime aussi" — 5:07
- CD single - United Kingdom
1. "Nuit" — 4:54
2. "Chanson d'amour" — 4:07
3. "Je l'aime aussi" — 6:10
- 12 inch single - United Kingdom
1. "Nuit" — 5:38
2. "Chanson d'amour" — 4:07
3. "Je l'aime aussi" — 6:10

== Charts and certifications ==
=== Weekly charts ===
Chart (1991)	Peak position
Europe (European Airplay Top 50)	15
Europe (Eurochart Hot 100)	36
France (SNEP)	6
Netherlands (Single Top 100)	30
Quebec (ADISQ)	2

=== Certifications ===
Certifications for "Nuit"
Region	Certification	Certified units/sales
France (SNEP)	Silver	200,000^{*}
^{*} Sales figures based on certification alone.
