= Minoritaire =

Studio album by Jean-Jacques Goldman
- Released: 1982
- Recorded: Studio Gang
- Genre: Pop rock
- Label: NEF
- Producer: Marc Lumbroso

Jean-Jacques Goldman chronology
| Démodé (1981) | Minoritaire (1982) | Positif (1984) |

Minoritaire was a 1982 album by Jean-Jacques Goldman, his second solo album sung in French. It was certified platinum in France in 1983, again in 1991, and again in 2001, for total sales of 900,000 copies.

It was recorded at the Studio Gang by Olivier do Espirito Santo and Jean-Pierre Janiaud. It was released by NEF and produced by Marc Lumbroso.

== Track listing ==
1. "Au bout de mes rêves"
2. "Comme toi"
3. "Toutes mes chaines"
4. "Jeanine Medicament Blues"
5. "Veiller tard"
6. "Quand la musique est bonne"
7. "Je ne vous parlerai pas d'elle"
8. "Être le premier"
9. "Si tu m'emmènes"
10. "Minoritaire"
11. "Quand la bouteille est vide"

== Personnel ==
- Guy Delacroix - bass
- Christophe Deschamps, Marc Chantereau - percussion
- Albane Alcalay, Guy Alcalay, Jean-Jacques Goldman, Jean-Pierre Janiaud - vocals
- Jean-Yves d'Angelo, Jean-Jacques Goldman - keyboards
- Claude Engel, Jean-Jacques Goldman - acoustic guitar
- Claude Engel, Jean-Jacques Goldman, Nono Krief (Jeanine Medicament Blues, Minoritaire), Patrice Tison - electric guitar
- "Jumpin" Ramon Roche - piano (Minoritaire)
- Patrick Bourgoin, Philippe Delacroix-Herpin - saxophone
- Georges Rodi - synthesizer
- Patrick Mondon - violin (Comme toi)
