= Un tour ensemble =

Live album by Jean-Jacques Goldman
- Released: 2003
- Genre: Pop
- Length: 126:11
- Label: Columbia

Jean-Jacques Goldman chronology
Pluriel 90/96 (2002)	Un tour ensemble (2003)

Un tour ensemble is a live album of music written and sung by Jean-Jacques Goldman. It was released by Columbia Records in 2003. It was also released on DVD. It was certified platinum in France for sales of 300,000 copies.

== Track listing ==
CD1

1. Je marche seul
2. Répétitions
3. Nos mains
4. Petite fille
5. Encore un matin
6. Poussière
7. Je voudrais vous revoir
8. Juste après
9. En passant
10. Veiller tard

CD2

1. Flûtiau et violon approximatifs
2. Et l'on n'y peut rien
3. Tournent les violons
4. Ensemble
5. On ira
6. Les choses
7. Né en 17 à Leidenstadt
8. C'est pas vrai
9. Présentation des musiciens
10. Nuit
11. Envole-moi
12. Puisque tu pars

== Charts and certifications ==
=== Weekly charts ===
Chart (2003)	Peak position
Belgian Albums (Ultratop Wallonia)	1
French Albums (SNEP)	1
Swiss Albums (Schweizer Hitparade)	7

=== Year-end charts ===
Chart (2003)	Position
Belgian Albums (Ultratop Wallonia)	9
French Albums (SNEP)	11
Swiss Albums (Schweizer Hitparade)	100

=== Certifications ===
Region	Certification	Certified units/sales
Belgium (BEA)	Gold	25,000^{*}
^{*} Sales figures based on certification alone.
