= À nos actes manqués =

Single by Fredericks, Goldman, Jones

from the album Fredericks Goldman Jones
- B-side: "Chanson d'amour"
- Released: 1991
- Recorded: France
- Genre: Pop, worldbeat, zouk
- Length: 4:22
- Label: Columbia
- Songwriter: Jean-Jacques Goldman
- Producers: Jean-Jacques Goldman, Erick Benzi

Fredericks, Goldman, Jones singles chronology
"Nuit" (1990)	"À nos actes manqués" (1991)	"Né en 17 à Leidenstadt" (1991)

"À nos actes manqués" is a 1991 song recorded by the French trio Jean-Jacques Goldman, Carole Fredericks and Michael Jones (the song was credited to Fredericks Goldman Jones). Released as the second single from their eponymous album, the song was one of the summer hits in France and was the trio's most successful single in terms of ranks on the chart. In 2011, M. Pokora covered the song on his album Mise à Jour and released it as a single, which achieved some success in French-speaking countries. The trio also released an English version, To The Deeds We Missed.

== Music and lyrics ==
The song was written and produced by Jean-Jacques Goldman. It was described by Elia Habib, an expert of French charts, as having "a lively melody with African accents, [it] celebrates in its lyrics the small failures of the everyday life with a lot of tenderness and humor". The refrain is performed by Carole Fredericks, while the verses are sung in turn by Jean-Jacques Goldman and Michael Jones.

In interviews, Goldman explained that the music was inspired by his travel in the Antilles, where he discovered the zouk. According to him, the song had "sad lyrics with a bright music".

The song is the eighth track on the album Fredericks Goldman Jones. It also features on the trio's compilations Pluriel 90-96, (as second track), and Intégrale 1990-2000, on the live albums Sur scène, Du New Morning au Zénith and En passant Tournée 1998 (only performed as a duet Goldman / Jones on this album). It is also included on several French compilations of the 1990s, such as the 2003 album Absolument 90: tubes français.

== Chart performance ==
"À nos actes manqués" entered the French Singles Chart on 16 March 1991 at number 24, reached the top ten three weeks later, then peaked at number two for four consecutive weeks, from 11 May to 1 June, being unable to dislodge Mylène Farmer's "Désenchantée" which topped the chart then. The single totaled 13 weeks in the top ten, dropped quickly and remained in the top 50 for 19 weeks. As the previous single "Nuit", it was certified Silver disc by the Syndicat National de l'Édition Phonographique, the French certifier.

On the European Hot 100, it debuted at number 57 on 6 April 1991, peaked at number 17 in its 11th week and remained on the chart for a total of 16 weeks. The song charted on the European Airplay Top 50 four weeks before its charting on the European Hot 100, entering at number 47, peaked at number 11 in its ninth week and fell off the chart after 17 weeks of presence. It was also much aired on the French radios, reaching number one on both the AM and FM charts.

== Formats and track listings ==
- CD single
1. "À nos actes manqués" — 4:22
2. "Chanson d'amour" — 4:08
- 7" single
1. "À nos actes manqués" — 4:22
2. "Chanson d'amour" — 4:08
- 12" maxi
1. "À nos actes manqués" (Version maxi) — 7:36
2. "Chanson d'amour" — 4:06

== Charts and certifications ==
=== Weekly charts ===
Chart (1991)	Peak position
Europe (European Airplay Top 50)	11
Europe (Eurochart Hot 100)	17
France (Airplay Chart [AM & FM Stations])	1
France (SNEP)	2
Quebec (ADISQ)	1

=== Year-end charts ===
Chart (1991)	Position
Europe (European Hot 100)	76

=== Certifications ===
Certifications for "À nos actes manqués"
Region	Certification	Certified units/sales
France (SNEP)	Silver	125,000^{*}
^{*} Sales figures based on certification alone.

== Cover versions ==
In 1993, a Spanish version of the song was developed in Chile for the children television show Cachureos. It was called "Lo que no pudimos hacer" ("What we couldn't do").

The song was covered by Exotic Girls in 1998, by the Collège de l'Esterel, by La Compagnie Créole and by Jacky Rapon in 2002, and by 3nity in 2004.

In 2009, the song was covered by Ensemble pour AVVO, in a Kahiléo Records/AVVO release as a charity song with revenues going to Association Village de la Veuve et de l'Orphélin (AVVO). The artists taking part included Mathieu Boldron, Léah Vincent, energyworld, Céline Languedoc, Valérie Louri, Jee-L, Rorisang Kgwathe, Théodora Valente, Sandy Louis, Phindile Nyandeni, Linda Rheretyane, Mélina, Thierry Picaut, Portia Talpot, Andrew Isar, Zamo, Olivier Breitman, Zama Magudulela. There were also a number of children in the video including Inès, Intissar, Johana, Marvin, Michaël, Sofiane, Yonas, Alyson, Emma, Ludivine, Maëliss, Andy, Benjamin, Enzo, Cameron.

=== M. Pokora version ===
"À nos actes manqués"

Single by M. Pokora

from the album Mise à Jour
- B-side: "Comme un soldat"
- Released: April 2011
- Recorded: France
- Genre: Pop
- Length: 3:46
- Label: Capitol, EMI
- Songwriter: Jean-Jacques Goldman
- Producer: The Bionix

M. Pokora singles chronology
"Mirage" (2011)	"À nos actes manqués" (2011)	"En Attendant la Fin" (2011)

On 18 March 2011, M. Pokora revealed that he had just recorded a cover version of "À nos actes manqués" that was scheduled to be released as a single. The song was only available on the second edition of his album Mise à Jour. Pokora said that before the release of the single, he sent a copy of his cover to Goldman through his son. Goldman sent Pokora an email two days later to say he considered the cover faithful to the original one, but updated.

On 9 April, Pokora performed the song in the French TV show Le Grand Quizz du Cerveau, broadcast on TF1.

A teaser of the music video was published on the internet on 22 April 2011, and Thierry Cadet of Charts in France qualified the video as "festive and sunny". Filmed in Cuba, it began to be broadcast in early May 2011. In it, Pokora performed a choreographied dance and ends with a message of thanks to his fans.

This version achieved success in France, where it debuted at number 99, then peaked at number 8 on the chart edition of 11 June 2011. It also reached number two on the Belgian (Wallonia) Ultratip Chart and number 16 on the main chart of the country.

Track listings

- CD single
1. "À nos actes manqués" — 3:46
2. "Comme un soldat" — 2:42
- CD single - Promo / Digital download
1. "À nos actes manqués" — 3:46

Charts

Chart (2011)	Peak position
Belgian (Wallonia) Singles Chart	16
Belgian (Wallonia) Airplay Chart	2
French SNEP Singles Chart	8
