= Positif (album) =

Studio album by Jean-Jacques Goldman
- Released: January 1984
- Recorded: Décember 1983 Studio Gang, Paris, France
- Genre: New wave, pop rock, progressive rock
- Label: JRG/BMG
- Producer: Jean-Jacques Goldman, Marc Lumbroso

Jean-Jacques Goldman chronology
Minoritaire (1982)	Positif (1984)	Non homologué (1985)

Singles from Positif
- 1. "Envole-moi" Released: January 1984; 2. "Encore un matin" Released: May 1984; 3. "Long Is the Road (Américain)" Released: October 1984

Positif was a 1984 studio album by Jean-Jacques Goldman, his third solo album recorded in French. It was recorded at Studio Gang by Olivier do Espirito Santo and Jean-Pierre Janiaud. It was released by JRG/BMG Music Publishing. It was certified diamond in France for sales of 1,000,000 copies.

== Track listing ==
No.	Title	Length
1.	"Envole-moi"	5:07
2.	"Nous ne nous parlerons pas"	4:20
3.	"Plus fort"	3:52
4.	"Petite Fille"	4:28
5.	"Dors bébé, dors"	3:25
6.	"Je chante pour ça"	4:14
7.	"Encore un matin"	4:11
8.	"Long Is the Road (Américain)"	4:56
9.	"Ton autre chemin"	7:18

== Personnel ==
- Guy Delacroix – bass
- Manu Katché, Marc Chantereau – percussion
- Catherine Bonnevay, Jean-Jacques Goldman, Jean-Pierre Janiaud, Dominique Poulain – vocals
- Jean-Jacques Goldman – keyboards
- Claude Engel, Jean-Jacques Goldman, Alain Pewzner, Kamil Rustam, Patrice Tison – guitar
- Roland Romanelli – organ
- Jean-Yves d'Angelo – piano
- John Helliwell – saxophone
- Roland Romanelli – synthesizer
- Patrice Mondon – violin
