= Fredericks Goldman Jones =

French musical trio

- Origin: France
- Genres: French songs
- Years active: 1990 – 1996
- Past members: Carole Fredericks; Jean-Jacques Goldman; Michael Jones

Fredericks Goldman Jones was the name of a famous French musical trio made up of Jean-Jacques Goldman, Carole Fredericks and Michael Jones. Established in 1990, it remained active until 1996. After the amicable separation of the trio and the continuation of each in their solo musical careers, the three remained very close friends and continued to perform on special concerts together.

The trio released two hugely successful albums, the self-titled Fredericks Goldman Jones in 1990 and Rouge in 1993. The song "À nos actes manqués" remains their most famous song. Other famous songs include "Né en 17 à Leidenstadt", "Juste après" and "Nuit". The order of the names was decided strictly on an alphabetical order of the family names of the trio.

== Roles ==
In the albums released by the trio, and despite the prominence of Jean-Jacques Goldman, Carole Fredericks and Michael Jones were involved as main singers and not as guitarist in case of Jones or backing vocalist in case of Fredericks as in earlier collaborations with Goldman. For example, "Il part" has the sole vocals of Carole Fredericks; Michael Jones, took part prominently in duo renditions for "Frères", most of "À nos actes manqués", whereas others are sung by all members of the trio like "Vivre cent vies", "Juste après", "Né en 17 à Leidenstadt", "Je l'aime aussi". Jean-Jacques Goldman due to his prominence as singer-songwriter sang solo in "Fermer les yeux" aided by a Bulgarian choir, or "Tu manques".

Most of the composition was to Jean-Jacques Goldman with the exception of a couple of songs with English lyrics that were co-written by the Welsh-born Michael Jones like "Nuit" or the English-language version of "À nos actes manqués". The trio also sang songs from the solo repertoire Goldman's solos albums including "Pas toi", "Il suffira d'un signe". Inversely Goldman used many of the trio songs in his solo concerts later on.

== Discography ==
=== Albums ===
Studio Albums

Year	Album
1990	Fredericks Goldman Jones: Record label: CBS
1993	Rouge: Record label: Columbia

Live Albums

Year	Album
1992	Sur scène: Record label: Columbia
1995	Du New Morning au Zénith: Record label: Columbia

Compilation album

Year	Album
1996	Pluriel 90/96

=== Singles ===
Year	Single	Peak positions	Certifications	Album
Year	Single	FRA	Certifications	Album
1990	"Nuit"	6		Fredericks Goldman Jones
1991	"À nos actes manqués"	2		Fredericks Goldman Jones
1991	"C'est ta chance"	16		Fredericks Goldman Jones
1991	"Né en 17 à Leidenstadt"	11		Fredericks Goldman Jones
1991	"C'est pas d'l'amour"	11		Fredericks Goldman Jones
1992	"Un, deux, trois"	8		Fredericks Goldman Jones
1992	"Tu manques"	12		Fredericks Goldman Jones
1992	"Il suffira d'un signe" [live]	14		Sur scène
1992	"Je commence demain" [live]	–		Sur scène
1993	"Rouge"	18		Rouge
1994	"Juste après"	32		Rouge
1994	"Des vies"	–		Rouge
1995	"Fermer les yeux"	33		Rouge
1995	"Pas toi" [live]	–		Du New Morning au Zénith
2000	"Peurs"	–		Pluriels 90/96
