= Je marche seul =

- One of vinyl singles

Single by Jean-Jacques Goldman

from the album Non homologué
- B-side: "Elle attend"
- Released: June 1985
- Recorded: France
- Genre: New wave, pop rock, synthpop
- Length: 4:03
- Label: Epic
- Songwriter(s): Jean-Jacques Goldman
- Producer(s): Jean-Jacques Goldman, Marc Lumbroso

Jean-Jacques Goldman singles chronology
"Long Is the Road (Americain)" (1984)	"Je marche seul" (1985)	"Je te donne" (1985)

"Je marche seul" ("I Walk Alone") is the name of a 1985 song recorded by the French singer and songwriter Jean-Jacques Goldman. It was released in June 1985 as the first single from his album Non homologué, as the tenth track. Though the song failed to reach number one on the French Singles Chart, it remains one of Goldman's biggest hit singles as well as one of his more popular songs live.

== Lyrics and music ==
The upbeat song begins with a long musical introduction highlighted by a sax solo.

When the song was released as a single, Goldman explained in various interviews that the it was very hard to compose. The lyrics describe someone walking alone along a road, lost in thought, able to forget everything for the moment and the pleasure of being anonymous while observing the world. Goldman has said that "Je marche seul" is a bright song because "the loneliness is not a punishment".

The music video, produced by Bernard Schmitt in Brussels, began to be aired on television in May 1985. It was well received in the media at the time. It shows Goldman portraying a navy sailor from Eastern Europe who has an affair in a train which is crossing the border.

Jean-Jacques Goldman said in an interview that even before the release of the song in the media, he was sure to have a hit: "So, for "Je marche seul", I had no doubt!"

== Live performances ==
On 13 October 1985, Goldman performed the song as duet with Daniel Balavoine during the charity concert of the 'Chanteurs sans frontières' in La Courneuve to raise funds for Ethiopia. The song was later included in Goldman's best of Intégrale and Singulier. It was performed during the singer's tours, and thus is available in the original version on Un tour ensemble, and in a medley version on En public, Traces and Intégrale.

On the television show Zénith, presented by Michel Denisot in December 1986, Goldman performed several of his songs in China. The shooting of "Je marche seul" took place in the Nankin avenue, in Shanghai, and shows the singer walking among thousands of Chinese.

== Cover versions ==
The song has been covered numerous times, including by Jean-Félix Lalanne in 1990, Eric Landman in 2000 for his album Eric Landman chante Jean-Jacques Goldman, and Le Collège de l'Esterel in 2002. The most popular cover is that of Les Enfoirés, performed by Muriel Robin, Pierre Palmade, Gérard Jugnot, Axel Bauer, Zazie, Hélène Ségara and Natasha St-Pier, from the 2004 concert, available on the album 2004: Les Enfoirés dans l'espace.

The song was also recorded in Dutch by Bart Herman, under the title "Ik loop alleen".

In 2012, Christophe Willem covered the song on the number one album Génération Goldman.

== Chart performances ==
The single had a long chart run on the French Singles Chart: it stayed in the top 50 for 30 weeks, from 22 June 1985 to 11 January 1986. It debuted at number 25, reached the top ten four weeks later, where it remained for 14 consecutive weeks, with a peak at number two in its 11th and 15th weeks; then it dropped slowly on the chart. The same year, it was certified Gold disc by the SNEP.

== Track listings ==
- 7" single
1. "Je marche seul" — 4:03
2. "Elle attend" — 3:17
- 12" maxi
1. "Je marche seul" (extended) — 5:58
2. "Elle attend" — 3:15

== Personnel ==
- Jean-Jacques Goldman — singing, backing vocals, acoustic guitar, electric guitar and piano
- Guy Delacroix — bass, programming
- Patrick Bourgoin — saxophone
- P.A. Dahan — drums
- Roland Romanelli — synthesizers
- Patrice Mondon — violin

== Charts and certifications ==
Chart (1985)	Peak position
France (Airplay Chart [AM Stations])	2
France (Airplay Chart [FM Stations])	1
France (SNEP)	2
Quebec (ADISQ)	14

Region	Certification	Certified units/sales
France (SNEP)	Gold	500,000^{*}
^{*} Sales figures based on certification alone.
