= En passant (Jean-Jacques Goldman album) =

Studio album by Jean-Jacques Goldman
- Released: 26 August 1997
- Recorded: April – August 1997; Studio Kevin Mobile; Studio Mega; Studio Gimmick
- Genre: Pop
- Length: 47:03
- Label: Columbia/Sony BMG
- Producer: Jean-Jacques Goldman

Jean-Jacques Goldman chronology
Singulier 81/89 (1996)	En passant (1997)	En passant tournée 1998 (1998)

Singles from En passant
- 1. "Sache que je" Released: 1997; 2. "Quand tu danses" Released: 1998; 3. "Bonne idée" Released: 1998

Professional ratings
Review scores
Source	Rating
Allmusic	4.5/5 stars

En passant is a 1997 album recorded by the French singer-songwriter Jean-Jacques Goldman. The CD was produced between April and August 1997 in collaboration with Erick Benzi at the Kevin Mobile, Mega and Gimmick studios, and was released on the Columbia/Sony BMG record label on 26 August 1997.

== Album information ==
The CD uses the HDCD format, which improves the quality of the audio (compared to regular CDs) when played back in a suitable player. The album is intimate and contains acoustic and blues melodies. It mainly deals with death ("On ira", "En passant") and love ("Sache que je", "Quand tu danses", "Les Murailles").

The album went straight to number one on the SNEP albums chart in France and remained for 82 weeks in the top 200. In Belgium (Wallonia), it also debuted at number one and totaled 65 weeks on the chart. It was only ranked for ten weeks in Switzerland, but earned a Platinum disc. It was less successful in Belgium (Flanders) where it stayed for six weeks on the charts (top 50).

The album provided three singles, but only the first one was a hit : "Sache que je" reached No. 19 in France and No. 18 in Belgium (Wallonia), while the other two singles ("Quand tu danses" and "Bonne idée") failed to enter the top 50 (#66 and No. 68 in France).

== Track listing ==
All tracks written, composed and performed by Goldman.

1. "Sache que je" – 5:25
2. "Bonne Idée" – 3:27
3. "Tout était dit" – 4:18
4. "Quand tu danses" – 4:25
5. "Le Coureur" – 4:14
6. "Juste quelques hommes" – 4:44
7. "Nos mains" – 3:18
8. "Natacha" – 3:01
9. "Les Murailles" – 2:28
10. "On ira" – 4:25
11. "En passant" – 7:18

== Personnel ==
- Jean-Jacques Goldman – guitar, vocals
- Erick Benzi – engineer
- Claude Gassian – photography
- Alexis Grosbois – coordination

== Release history ==
Date	Label	Region	Format	Catalog
1997	Mercury	Belgium, France, Switzerland	CD	4887912
1998	Sony International	Belgium, France, Switzerland	CD	488791

== Certifications and sales ==
Country	Certification	Date	Sales certified	Physical sales
France	Diamond	1998	1,000,000	1,301,000
Switzerland	Platinum	1997	50,000	

== Charts ==
Chart (1997/98)	Peak position
Belgian (Flanders) Albums Chart	38
Belgian (Wallonia) Albums Chart	1
French SNEP Albums Chart	1
Swiss Albums Chart	10

End of year chart (1997)	Position
Belgian (Wallonia) Albums Chart	5
French Albums Chart	2
End of year chart (1998)	Position
Belgian (Wallonia) Albums Chart	26
French Albums Chart	25
