= Démodé =

Studio album by Jean-Jacques Goldman
- Released: September 4, 1981
- Recorded: Summer 1981
- Studio: Studios Pathé, Paris; Studio Vénus, Longueville
- Genre: Pop; new wave; progressive rock
- Length: 44:29
- Label: BMG France
- Producer: Jean-Jacques Goldman

Jean-Jacques Goldman chronology
Démodé (1981)	Minoritaire (1982)

Démodé is Jean-Jacques Goldman's first solo album sung in French, set in 1981. It was recorded at the Studios Pathé in Paris and the Studio Vénus in Longueville. The album has also been released under the names A l'envers and Jean-Jacques Goldman. It was certified platinum in France for sales of 300,000 copies.

== Track listing ==
All tracks by Jean-Jacques Goldman

1. "A l'envers" – 3:54
2. "Sans un mot" – 3:29
3. "Brouillard" – 5:11
4. "Pas l'indifférence" – 4:12
5. "Il suffira d'un signe" – 5:50
6. "Je t'aimerai quand-même" – 4:54
7. "Autre Histoire" – 4:19
8. "Quelque chose de bizarre" – 4:00
9. "Quel exil" – 2:59
10. "Le Rapt" – 4:27
11. "Juste un petit moment" – 1:33

== Personnel ==
- Jean-Jacques Goldman: Acoustic and electric guitars, acoustic and electric piano, vocals
- Patrice Tison: Electric guitars
- Max Middleton: Keyboards
- Georges Rodi: Synthesizers
- Guy Delacroix: Bass
- Clément Bailly: Drums, percussion
- Bernard Illouz: Additional vocals
