= Gildas Arzel =

French musician (born 1961)

- Born: 21 January 1961 (age 65); Alsace, France
- Occupations: Musician, songwriter
- Instrument: Multi-instrumentalist
- Formerly of: Die Form; Canada; El Club

Gildas Arzel (born 21 January 1961) is a French singer, songwriter, and multi-instrumentalist from Alsace. In addition to his solo career, he has been in musical formations such as the duo Die Form, with Erick Benzi; the group Canada (with Benzi, Jacques Veneruso, and Gwenn Arzel); and since 2007, El Club, with Benzi, Michael Jones, and Christian Seguret (fr).

Arzel began his solo career playing a mix of Irish and Scottish folk, blues, rock, Cajun, Celtic, and ethnic music. He has written a number of songs for and collaborated with Celine Dion, Johnny Hallyday, Roch Voisine, Jean-Jacques Goldman, Carole Fredericks, Michael Jones, Maurane, Nanette Workman, Florent Pagny, Yannick Noah, France D'Amour, J.A.H.O., and others.

== Discography ==
=== Solo ===
- Les gens du voyage (1991)
- Entrer dans la danse (1994)
- Gildas Arzel (1997)
- Autour de nous (2001)
- Greneville (2015)

=== Other work ===
with Canada (Gildas Arzel, Gween Arzel, Erick Benzi, Jacques Veneruso)

- Sur les traces (1988)

with Gabriel Yacoub

- Quatre (1994)

with Céline Dion (Gildas Arzel, Erick Benzi, Jean-Jacques Goldman, Jacques Veneruso)

- 1 fille & 4 types (2003)

with El Club (Gildas Arzel, Erick Benzi, Michael Jones, Christian Seguret)

- Plus fort que ça (2007)
