= Sur scène =

Live album by Fredericks Goldman Jones
- Released: 26 November 1992
- Recorded: 12 August – 15 November 1992: Théâtre Antique de Vienne, Esplanade du Lac, Aix-les-Bains; Halle Tony Garnier, Lyon
- Genre: Pop, rock
- Label: Columbia

Fredericks Goldman Jones chronology
| Fredericks Goldman Jones (1990) | Sur scène (1992) | Rouge (1993) |

Singles from Sur scène
- 1. "Il suffira d'un signe" Released: 1992

Sur scène is a 1992 album recorded by the trio Fredericks Goldman Jones. It was their first live album and second album overall. It was recorded between August and November 1991 in Vienna, Aix-les-Bains and Lyon and was released on 26 November 1992. It spawned a sole single which achieved success in France : "Il suffira d'un signe (live)" (#14), which was originally recorded for Goldman's first studio album, Démodé.

== Album information ==
The album contains seven songs from the trio's first studio album, plus four songs previously recorded in a studio version on his 1980s solo albums.

The album debuted at number five on 16 December 1992 and climbed to number one two weeks later and stayed there for three consecutive weeks. It was ranked for 14 weeks in the top ten and for 26 weeks in the top 50. In 2000, it earned a Double platinum disc for over 600,000 copies sold.

== Track listing ==
All tracks written and composed by Goldman (unless notified).

1. "Nuit" (Jean-Jacques Goldman, Michael Jones/Jean Jacques Goldman) — 7:30
2. "À quoi tu sers ?" — 7:37
3. "Il suffira d'un signe" — 4:19
4. "Un, deux, trois" — 6:08
5. "Je commence demain" — 5:33
6. "Peurs" — 7:20
7. "Je l'aime aussi" — 7:34
8. "Là-bas" — 7:24
9. "Vivre 100 vies" — 5:07
10. "C'est pas d'l'amour" — 6:06
11. "À nos actes manqués" — 10:08

== Personnel ==
- Christophe Nègre – saxo
- Chistopher Deschamps – drums
- Claude Gassian – photo
- Denis Leloup – trombone
- Christian Martinez – trumpet
- Jacky Mascarel – keyboards

== Charts ==
=== Weekly charts ===
Weekly chart performance for Sur scène
| Chart (1993) | Peak |
|---|---|
| European Albums (European Top 100 Albums) | 19 |

=== Year-end charts ===
1993 year-end chart performance for Sur scène
| Chart (1993) | Rank |
|---|---|
| European Albums (European Top 100 Albums) | 94 |
