= Taï Phong =

French progressive rock band

- Origin: France
- Years active: 1972-1982; 2000 (reformed)
- Labels: WEA
- Members: Khanh Maï
- Past members: Jean-Jacques Goldman; Jean-Alain Gardet; Taï Sinh; Pascal Wuthrich; Michael Jones; Stéphan Caussarieu
- Website: www.tadros.com

Taï Phong is a French progressive rock band formed by two Vietnamese brothers, Khanh Maï (guitar, voice) and Taï Sinh (bass, guitar, voice, keyboards), in 1975. They were joined by Jean-Alain Gardet (keyboards), Stephan Caussarieu (drums, percussion), and Jean-Jacques Goldman (guitar, voice, violin).

They released three albums between 1975 and 1979: Taï Phong (1975), Windows (1976), and Last Flight (1979). "Sister Jane" (1975), the first single from their first album, was a radio hit.

The band reunited in 2000 with Khanh Maï and Stephan Caussarieu. They are joined by Hervé Acosta (voice) and Angelo Zarzuelo (keyboards).

As of 2007, Khan Maï remains the only original member of the band.

== Discography ==
=== Albums ===
- 1975: Taï Phong
- 1976: Windows
- 1979: Last Flight
- 2000: Sun
- 2013: The Return of Samurai
- 2021: Dragons Of The 7th Seas

=== Singles ===
- 1975: "Sister Jane" / "Crest"
- 1975: "(If You're Headed) North for Winter" / "Let Us Play"
- 1976: "Games" / "The Gulf of Knowledge"
- 1977: "Follow Me" / "Dance"
- 1978: "Back Again" / "Cherry"
- 1978: "Fed Up" / "Shanghai Casino"
- 1979: "Rise Above the Wind" (specially recorded for Sono)
- 1986: "I'm Your Son" / "Broken Dreams"

== Bibliography ==
- Ludovic Lorenzi, Taï Phong : l'aventure continue, éd. Lorenzi, 2007. (ISBN 978-2-9528789-0-6)
