= Puisque tu pars =

Single by Jean-Jacques Goldman

from the album Entre gris clair et gris foncé
- B-side: "Entre gris clair et gris foncé"
- Released: July 1988
- Recorded: France
- Genre: Pop
- Length: 4:50
- Label: Epic
- Songwriter: Jean-Jacques Goldman
- Producers: Jean-Jacques Goldman; Marc Lumbroso

Jean-Jacques Goldman singles chronology
"C'est ta chance" (1988)	"Puisque tu pars" (1988)	"Il changeait la vie" (1988)

"Puisque tu pars" is a 1987 song recorded by the French singer Jean-Jacques Goldman. It was released in July 1988 as the fourth single from his album Entre gris clair et gris foncé, on which it features as the sixth track in an extended version. The song was a number three hit in France.

== Background, lyrics and music ==
Goldman explained that the song deals with "departure, separation, and everything it implies". He said : "The idea came to me at the end of my concerts, when people sang: 'this is just a goodbye ...' [...] So I thought about writing a song about departure, but to show that departure is not necessarily sad, but there were also positive sides to leaving and separating."

The song, which shows a "certain maturity" in the writing, has an "emotional expressiveness which depicts the dilemma of a love that doesn't want to be possessive".

The song is included on several of Goldman's albums, such as Traces, Intégrale and Singulier (best of), Du New Morning au Zénith and Un tour ensemble (in live versions). The live performance by Goldman and Les Fous Chantants features on the DVD Solidarités Inondations.

== Cover versions ==
"Puisque tu pars" was covered by Jean-Félix Lalanne in 1990, by Michael Lecler in 1996 (instrumental version), by Les Fous Chantants in 2000 (features on the album 1 000 choristes rendent hommage à Jean-Jacques Goldman, by Le Collège de l'Estérel in 2002, and by Les 500 Choristes in 2006 (for the compilation of the same name, eighth track).

The song was also covered in Mandarin Chinese by Taiwanese singer Tracy Huang in 1990 under the title "讓愛自由", which translates to "Let Love Be Free".

It was covered in English-language by Céline Dion, under the title "Let's Talk About Love," available on the eponymous album in 1998 and in 1999 on one of her live albums, Au coeur du stade. The English lyrics were written by Bryan Adams and Eliot Kennedy. A demo version of Adams' translation appeared on the CD single "Cloud Number Nine" in 1999.

Tony Carreira made a cover version in the Portuguese language under the title "Já que te vais" although in the beginning before the controversy authorship of several songs, the song was registered as written by Ricardo Landum and Tony Carreira.

== Chart performance ==
In France, "Puisque tu pars" went straight to number 23 on the chart edition of 16 July 1988 and reached the top ten two weeks later, peaked for three non consecutive weeks at number three, remaining behind the two summer hits "Nuit de folie" and "Un roman d'amitié (Friend You Give Me a Reason)". It totaled 15 weeks in the top ten and 24 weeks in the top 50. It achieved Silver status awarded by the Syndicat National de l'Édition Phonographique. It was also released in Canada and Japan, but failed to reach the singles chart in these countries. ON the European Hot 100 Singles, it debuted at number 66 on 30 July 1988, reached a peak of number ten twice, in its seventh and tenth weeks, and fell off the chart after 22 weeks of presence. It also charted for four weeks on the European Airplay Top 50 with a peak at number 31 on 10 September 1988.

== Track listings ==
- CD single
1. "Puisque tu pars" — 7:24
2. "Entre gris clair et gris foncé"
3. "Tout petit monde"
- 7" single
1. "Puisque tu pars" — 4:50
2. "Entre gris clair et gris foncé" — 3:57
- 12" maxi
1. "Puisque tu pars" (extended version) — 7:24
2. "Puisque tu pars" (edit) — 4:50
3. "Entre gris clair et gris foncé" — 3:57

== Charts and certifications ==
=== Weekly charts ===
Chart (1988)	Peak position
Europe (European Airplay Top 50)	31
Europe (European Hot 100)	10
France (SNEP)	3

=== Year-end charts ===
Chart (1988)	Position
Europe (European Hot 100)	47

=== Certifications ===
Certifications for "Puisque tu pars"
Region	Certification	Certified units/sales
France (SNEP)	Silver	250,000^{*}
^{*} Sales figures based on certification alone.
