= Du New Morning au Zénith =

Live album by Fredericks Goldman Jones
- Released: 18 May 1995
- Recorded: 26 April – 12 June 1994: New Morning, Paris, France; Summum, Grenoble, France; Patinoire de Malley, Lausanne, Switzerland
- Genre: Synthpop, pop rock
- Label: Columbia

Fredericks Goldman Jones chronology
Rouge (1993)	Du New Morning au Zénith (1995)	Pluriel 90/96 (2000)

Jean-Jacques Goldman chronology
Rouge (1993)	Du New Morning au Zénith (1995)	Singulier 81/89 (1996)

Du New Morning au Zénith is a 1994 double album recorded live by the trio Fredericks Goldman Jones. Composed of 31 tracks, it contains many successful songs from Goldman's previous albums and from the trio's two studio albums Fredericks Goldman Jones and Rouge. It was released on 18 May 1995 and was successful in francophone countries.

== Recording and releases ==
It was recorded between the 26 April 1994 and the 12 June 1994, first at the New Morning in Paris (the first 14 tracks of the first CD), then during the Rouge concert tour, at the Summum in Grenoble and at the Patinoire de Malley in Lausanne.

The money raised by the four concerts at the New Morning in April 1994 was donated to Amnesty International. During the show, a cover version of Aretha Franklin's song "Think" was performed.

In 2006, 14 performances from the album were included on a DVD box set Souvenirs de tournée - Du New Morning au Zénith.

== Chart performances ==
In France, the album went straight to number-two on 14 May 1995 and remained there for four consecutive weeks, being unable to dislodge Céline Dion's D'eux which was atop then. It totaled 16 weeks in the top ten and 26 weeks on the chart (top 50). It earned a Platinum disc for over 300,000 copies sold.

In Belgium (Wallonia), the album peaked at number two for two weeks and stayed for 24 weeks in the top 50. It was ranked for five weeks in the top 50 in Belgium (Flanders).

== Track listings ==
=== Disc 1 ===
1. "Veiller tard" (Goldman) — 5:44
2. "Ne lui dis pas" (Goldman) — 5:50
3. "Quelque chose de bizarre" (Goldman) — 3:57
4. "Jeanine médicament blues" (Goldman) — 4:36
5. "Il part" (Goldman) — 4:46
6. "Il y a" (Goldman) — 3:22
7. "P'tit blues peinard" (Goldman) — 3:33
8. "Confidentiel" (Goldman) — 3:33
9. "C'est pas d'l'amour" (Goldman) — 5:59
10. "Un, deux, trois" (Goldman) — 4:01
11. "Pas toi" (Goldman) — 5:23
12. "Think" (Franklin, White) — 2:50
13. "Knock on Wood" (Floyd, Stephen) — 3:47
14. "Tobacco Road" (Loudermilk) — 5:30
15. "Serre-moi" [début] (Goldman) — 3:09
16. "Des vôtres" (Goldman) — 3:45
17. "Envole-moi" (Goldman) — 5:35

=== Disc 2 ===
1. "Que disent les chansons du monde ?" (Goldman) — 6:04
2. "Comme toi" (Goldman) — 4:41
3. "Être le premier" (Goldman) — 6:18
4. "Je commence demain" (Goldman) — 5:19
5. "Des vies" (Goldman) — 5:51
6. "On n'a pas changé" (Goldman) — 7:18
7. "Frères" (Goldman) — 5:44
8. "Juste après" (Goldman) — 5:22
9. "À nos actes manqués" (Goldman) — 4:22
10. "Fermer les yeux" (Goldman) — 8:33
11. "Il suffira d'un signe" (Goldman) — 4:25
12. "Rouge" (Goldman) — 6:47
13. "Puisque tu pars" (Goldman) — 2:49
14. "Serre-moi [fin](Goldman) — 2:56

== Personnel ==
- Beckie Bell, Yvone Jones – chorus
- Erick Benzi – percussion
- Jacky Mascarel, Philippe Grandvoinet – keyboards
- Claude Le Perron – bass
- Christophe Deschamps – drum kit
- Michael Jones – guitar
- Claude Gassian – booklet
- Tom Lord-Alge – engineer, mixing
- Jean Remy Mazenc – multi instruments
- Andy Scott – mixing
- Alain Aboulker, Pierre Buisson, Christian Desille, Emmanuel Goulet, Frédéric Perrinet, Rene Weis – assistants
- Yannick Wild, Alexis Grosbois – producer

== Release history ==
Date	Label	Region	Format	Catalog
18 May 1985	Columbia	France, Belgium, Switzerland	Double CD	480308
2000	JRC	France, Belgium, Switzerland	Double CD	4803082

== Charts ==
Chart (1995)	Peak position
Belgian (Flanders) Albums Chart	31
Belgian (Wallonia) Albums Chart	2
French Albums Chart	2

End of year chart (1995)	Position
Belgian (Wallonia) Albums Chart	14
French Albums Chart	8

== Certifications ==
Region	Certification	Certified units/sales
Belgium (BRMA)	Gold	25,000^{*}
France (SNEP)	Platinum	300,000^{*}
^{*} Sales figures based on certification alone.
