= Rouge (Fredericks Goldman Jones album) =

Studio album by Fredericks Goldman Jones
- Released: 29 November 1993
- Recorded: February – October 1993
- Studio: Studio Guillaume Tell, Paris; Studio ICP, Brussels; Studio la Blaque, Aix-en-Provence
- Genre: Pop, rock
- Label: Columbia
- Producer: Erick Benzi

Fredericks Goldman Jones chronology
Sur scène (1992)	Rouge (1993)	Du New Morning au Zénith (1995)

Singles from Rouge
- 1. "Rouge" Released: 1993; 2. "Juste après" Released: 1994; 3. "Fermer les yeux" Released: 1995

Rouge is a 1993 album recorded by the trio Fredericks Goldman Jones. It was their second studio album and was recorded at the studios Guillaume Tell, ICP and la Blaque, located in France and Belgium. The album was released on 29 November 1993 and was not as successful as the singers' first studio album, but still spawned three singles which achieved some success in France : "Rouge" (#14), "Juste après" (#32) and "Fermer les yeux" (#33).

== Album information ==
The collector edition of Rouge has a box in aluminium, whose front cover is entirely carved, and some elements of which are painted red. The Alexandrov Ensemble participated in this recording, on the song "Rouge".

The album debuted at number one on 5 December 1993 and stayed there for seven consecutive weeks. It was ranked for 17 weeks in the top ten and for 42 weeks in the top 50. In 1995, it earned a Diamond disc for over 1,000,000 copies sold.

The album was briefly ranked at #41 in Switzerland.

== Track listing ==
All tracks written and composed by Jean-Jacques Goldman.

1. "Serre-moi" — 2:18
2. "On n'a pas changé" — 5:55
3. "Que disent les chansons du monde ?" — 4:54
4. "Il part" — 5:00
5. "Juste après" — 4:39
6. "Rouge" — 6:12
7. "Des vôtres" — 5:44
8. "Frères" — 5:12
9. "Des vies" — 4:19
10. "Ne lui dis pas" — 4:47
11. "Elle avait 17 ans" — 5:07
12. "Fermer les yeux" — 6:41

== Personnel ==
- Tom Lord Aldge – mixing
- Erick Benzi – arranger, keyboards, producer
- Alex Firla, Boris Beziat – assistant engineers
- Carole Fredericks – vocal
- Claude Gassian – photo
- Jean-Luc Seigneur – engraving
- Jean-Jacques Goldman – guitar, vocal, art direction, musical direction, lyrics
- Michael Jones – guitar, vocal, guitar arrangements
- Pino Palladino, Guy Delacroix – bass
- Andy Scott – producer, engineer
- Patrice Tison – guitar
- Chris Whitten – drums

== Certifications ==
Region	Certification	Certified units/sales
France (SNEP)	3× Platinum	900,000^{*}
Switzerland (IFPI Switzerland)	Gold	25,000^{^}
^{*} Sales figures based on certification alone.^{^} Shipments figures based on certification alone.
