= Carole Fredericks =

American singer

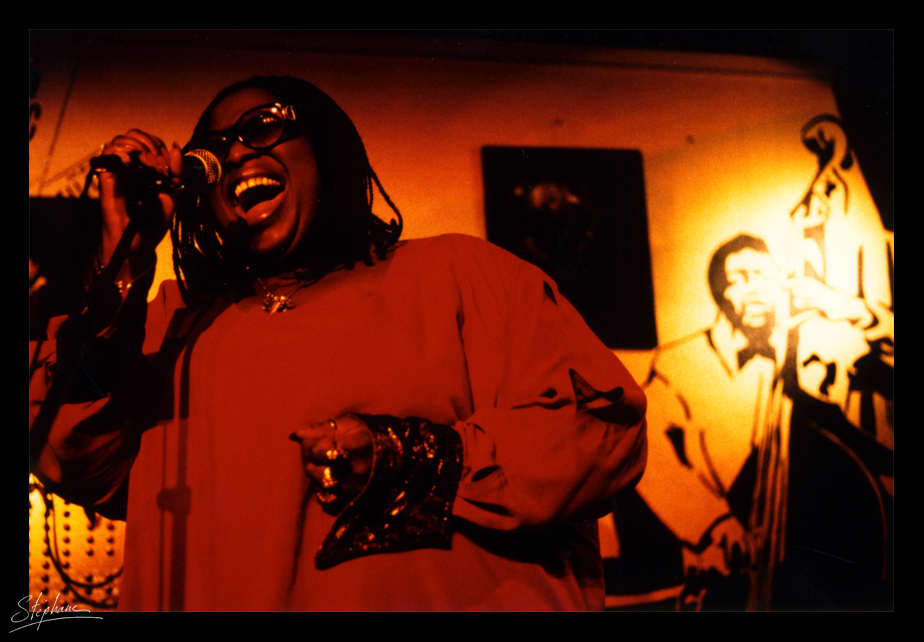

Background information
- Also known as: Carole Fredericks
- Born: Carole Denise Fredericks; June 5, 1952; Springfield, Massachusetts, U.S.
- Died: June 7, 2001 (aged 49) Dakar, Senegal
- Genres: Gospel; Blues; Rhythm and blues; Rock; French Pop
- Instrument: Voice
- Years active: 1973–2001
- Labels: BMG; M6 Interactions; Carla Music
- Formerly of: Taj Mahal; Fredericks Goldman Jones; Les Enfoirés; Poetic Lover; Voix de L'Espoir; Mylène Farmer; Celine Dion
- Website: carolefredericksfoundation.org cdfmusiclegacy.com carolefredericks.net

Carole Denise Fredericks (June 5, 1952 – June 7, 2001) was an American singer best known for her work in French music. She was the younger sister of Taj Mahal.

Between 1990 and 1996 she was in the trio Fredericks Goldman Jones alongside singer-songwriter Jean-Jacques Goldman and Welsh–French singer-guitarist Michael Jones.

== Biography ==
=== Early years ===
Fredericks was born in Springfield, Massachusetts, on June 5, 1952, the youngest of Mildred and Harry Fredericks' five children. She and her siblings were raised in Springfield and were educated in the public school system. Her mother who was originally from Bennettsville, South Carolina, sang with Big Bands and on Sundays was the lead singer for a local gospel choir. Her father, the son of immigrants from the island of Saint Kitts, was a pianist and wrote arrangements for jazz trios. Growing up in her household, Fredericks was exposed to music from around the world. Her parents encouraged creative expression in all their children. Fredericks' brothers and sister developed careers in art, music, dance and theatre. Her eldest brother is Grammy-winning blues musician, Taj Mahal.

Her parents, who came of age during the Harlem Renaissance, instilled in their children a sense of pride in their West Indian and African ancestry through their stories. Fredericks never got to know her father. When she was two years old, he was killed in a construction accident, crushed by a tractor when it flipped over. Although her mother would remarry later, the loss of her father left Fredericks with grief that remained with her the rest of her life.

By the time she was 20, Fredericks was living in Oakland, California. A year after her graduation from Classical High School, she persuaded Taj Mahal to send for her. Upon her arrival in San Francisco, He put Fredericks to work as a background vocalist on a number of his albums – Mo' Roots; Music Fuh Ya'; Together; and Evolution. To supplement the income from session work, Fredericks was employed as a receptionist for the Pacific Personnel Services. She was one of 71 voices in the New Generation Singers Gospel Choir (Oakland, California) and performed with Odetta in the stage play Look What A Wonder. Fredericks organized a trio – piano, bass and voice – and booked singing engagements on the weekends.

In an interview from OH LA! Magazine she said: "I was part of a choir for three years and I was doing backup work. It was not enough to sustain a comfortable lifestyle and I started to get sick and tired of this life. I refused to get by on my brother's name. During this period, I was working in San Francisco at a French restaurant, La Belle Helene. Some of the patrons would often suggest that I go to France. They said I would do very well there. They were very convincing and without knowing a bit of French, I left it all. I bought a one-way ticket and I was off to Paris. Everyone thought I was crazy."

=== Arrival in France ===
Fredericks arrived in France to pursue a singing career in January 1979. Fredericks met the owner of La Belle Helene at the airport.

"He called his friends and I found myself working almost immediately. I started to sing everywhere. It was barely three weeks after my arrival that I was signed with Carla Music to record a disco album entitled Black Orchid."

One of the songwriters for Black Orchid was another American singer, Ann Calvert. Through Calvert, Fredericks met Baltimore native Yvonne Jones. Together they formed a trio of background vocalists that were in demand by leading recording artists – Dalida, Johnny Hallyday, Hugues Aufray, Carlos and Sylvie Vartan.

Fredericks was determined to learn French as quickly as possible. As her knowledge improved, engagements extended from the studio to the stage. By 1985, Fredericks had established herself as a singer and performed in concerts with Laurent Voulzy, Michel Berger, France Gall and Eddy Mitchell. In 1981 she was a backing singer for Jean-Claude Pascal on the Luxembourg entry to the Eurovision Song Contest, tying for eleventh place.

1985

In 1985, Fredericks was featured in the Gilbert Bécaud spectacular. Later that year, she toured Scandinavia with Mireille Mathieu. She was cast in Je vous aime by Claude Berri and in Roman Polanski's Pirates opposite Walter Matthau. Other film roles followed.

1986

Fredericks' knowledge of the French language greatly contributed to her success. By now, Fredericks was singing with leading Francophone artists – Johnny Hallyday, Mylène Farmer, François Feldman, Patricia Kaas, Julien Clerc, and Liane Foly.

Her reputation brought her name to the attention of Jean-Jacques Goldman.

=== Fredericks Goldman Jones ===
"[Carole] arrived in France in 1979. Shortly afterwards she launched a career as a studio musician – i.e. one of those people with extraordinary technical skills who put her talent at the service of other singers. In the course of her career Carole provided backing vocals for a lot of different singers and that is how I came to meet her myself" ... Jean-Jacques Goldman.

Fredericks' good fortune resulted in a telephone call from Goldman, asking her to sing on his next album and tour with him.

"That was a turning point for my life. He had seen me shine in my little corner; he allowed me to take center stage," said Fredericks. Jean-Jacques and Fredericks collaborated on a number of significant film soundtracks and albums projects.

In September 1987, Fredericks went into the studio with Goldman to record background vocals on his album Entre gris clair et gris foncé. She then toured with him for a year, August 1988 to August 1989.

1989

Goldman asked Fredericks to record Brother, the theme song for the film L'UNION SACRÉE by Alexandre Arcady in 1989. In between projects with Goldman, Fredericks continued to go out on tour, with Mylène Farmer and she was in the studio working on albums for Vanessa Paradis and Véronique Sanson.

1990

Goldman invited Fredericks to join him and second guitarist, Michael Jones, on stage. Almost immediately, Fredericks was catapulted into prominence with the release of their debut album Fredericks Goldman Jones. The album went Diamond, selling 600,000 copies in the first 6 months, 1 million copies in the first year. Fredericks Goldman Jones toured extensively throughout Europe, South East Asia, Japan, Africa and the French-speaking world. It also resulted in one of the best known songs by the trio titled "À nos actes manqués".

1992

Fredericks Goldman Jones released a second album Sur scène in 1992. The album reached Platinum sales.

Fredericks was asked to sing on an album project with Eric Clapton and Elton John. She sang on Runaway Train for the Elton John album The One.

1993

After the Iron Curtain collapsed, Fredericks Goldman Jones visited Moscow to record their third album Rouge. The album featured the voices of Russia's Red Army Choir. Fredericks Goldman Jones and the Red Army Choir embarked on an international tour. The album skyrocketed to Diamond status.

1994

For their next album, Fredericks Goldman Jones recorded a live performance at a Paris night club. The album featured the sweaty trio singing selections from their earlier albums. The result was - Fredericks Goldman Jones Du New Morning au Zénith. In a breakout performance, Fredericks took command of the stage supported by Becky Bell and Yvonne Jones, Jean-Jacques, Michael Jones and the entire band showcasing three R&B classics - Aretha Franklin's Think MySpace.com video, Knock on Wood Video on YouTube, and Tobacco Road. The gritty club atmosphere, performance spontaneity and realism were captured on film then released as a music video. The album and subsequent DVD went Platinum.

1995

In 1995 Goldman wrote a new album, D'eux for Céline Dion. Fredericks, Yvonne Jones and Becky Bell were asked to provide background vocals for the album. D'eux became a breakthrough international hit for Céline Dion and was released in the United States under the name The French Album. D'EUX / THE FRENCH ALBUM sold a record 9 million copies worldwide to become the best selling French-language album of all time.

=== Solo career ===
At this point, Fredericks began writing songs for her own solo project.

1996

Fredericks recorded Springfield, the first of two solo albums, in July 1996. Named after her hometown in Western Massachusetts, Springfield was dedicated to her mother, Mildred, who died just before the album was completed.

"She is no longer of this world but she is always with me. The gift that I have, I received it from her," said Fredericks .

Springfield pays tribute to those who influenced Fredericks' music and became her idols: Aretha Franklin, the Beatles, Sam and Dave, and Mahalia Jackson. She decided to sing what she knew best: gospel and the blues. Gildas Arzel provided the music with arrangements by Erick Benzi. Carole wrote 12 original songs collaborating with Jacques Veneruso, Jean-Jacques Goldman, Christophe Satterfield and Yvonne Jones. Springfield also showcased You Had It Comin, a rare duet with older brother Taj Mahal. Recorded entirely in English, Springfield was released to rave reviews in France, Belgium and Switzerland. Fredericks embarked on a solo European tour with her band Les Dragons.

1997

Fredericks was joined by Maria Popkiewicz and Yvonne Jones in the studio to add vocals to En passant, the newest solo album by Jean-Jacques Goldman.

1998

Run Away Love, a single from the album Springfield debuted as the theme song to an action film Une Chance sur Deux starring Vanessa Paradis, Jean-Paul Belmondo, and Alain Delon.

Fredericks recorded Personne Ne Saurait, a duet with the all-boy group Poétic Lover. Dailymotion.com video The song was written by Goldman and Jacques Veneruso. The CD single generated "best in sales in its class for autumn 1998" on the pop charts. Fredericks made the rounds for talk shows and television interviews.

Goldman took time out to write a second album for Céline Dion, S'il Suffisait D'aimer. Fredericks returned to the studio to lend her vocal support on the album.

1999

Fredericks followed the success of Springfield with an all French album Couleurs et Parfums in 1999. "I love color," she said. "It's like life, the sun, it's smiling. As for perfume, I always wear the same mixture of an extract of coconut oil and of Nocturne de Caron. That is my signature."

Couleurs et Parfums was the natural evolution of an artist coming into her own. Fredericks surrounded herself with friends and musicians – Yvonne Jones, Goldman, Jacques Veneruso and newcomer, Frédéric Kocourek. Together they created a rap, rhythm and blues inspired album. Fredericks' early experiences in America and her love affair with France found full expression on Couleurs et Parfums' 11 original tracks.

Four hit singles emerged from Couleurs et Parfums...

- Personne ne Saurait (debuted in August 1998 with Poétic Lover)
- "Qu'est-ce qui t'amène?" (debuted April 30, 1999)
- Respire (debuted September 27, 1999)
- Le Prix a Payer (April 16, 2000 debuted with only radio promotion )

December 2–11, 1999 Fredericks headlined as a solo act in Paris at Saint-Germain-des-Prés Auditorium. She shared the stage with invited guests: Jean-Jacques Goldman, Faudel, Allan Théo, Bruno Pelletier, Michael Jones, Kani Curry of Poétic Lover and Nicole Amovin.

Liane Foly and Fredericks perform Une femme amoureuse / A Woman in Love before a studio audience for the music television show, TAPIS ROUGE on France2. Dailymotion.com video

Fredericks ended the 1900s with a performance on December 31, 1999 at the world famous Le Lido in Paris. Early in 2001, Fredericks performs with Roch Voisine the new single release L'Aziza on the studio television show, Taratata. Following the performance, Fredericks and Roch are interviewed. L'Aziza was written by Daniel Balavoine and was a great anti-racist hit by this French humanist singer-songwriter in the 1980s. Dailymotion video

=== Philanthropy / Charity ===
Fredericks contributed to concerts and on recordings for AIDS victims, the Make-a-Wish Foundation, and Amnesty International. She performed for nine seasons with Les Enfoirés on behalf of Les Restos du Cœur, an organization set up by French humorist, Michel Coluche (whose former wife Véronique Colucci took over after his death), to care for the hungry and homeless in France.

"A larger than life figure with a generous spirit, Carole was a performer who threw herself into her live performances body and soul. She liked nothing more than getting involved in fund-raising tours with singers and musician friends. Indeed, Carole was a regular at charity concerts organized by Restos du Cœur and Les Enfoirés. On March 8 (2001) ... she brought the house down at "Voix de l'Espoir [Voices of Hope]" concert organized on International Women's Day. Taking the stage at Club Med World in Paris with a host of other female singers including Princess Erika, Jocelyne Beroard, Rokia Traoré and Lââm, Carole helped to raise much needed funds for the construction of a Pan-African children's hospital in Dakar [Senegal, West Africa]." –Pierre Rene-Worms for rfimusique.com.

=== Death ===
Two days after her 49th birthday, Fredericks died of a heart attack in Dakar, Senegal, on June 7, 2001. At the request of the French Minister of Culture, Fredericks was buried in Montmartre Cemetery. On June 18, a funeral service was held for her at Eglise Notre-Dame de Clignancourt, the church that stands across from her apartment in the 18th district.

Montmartre Cemetery

20 Avenue Rachel 75018 Paris, France 23rd Division - Avenue Carrière

"Carole Fredericks was a great lady of song whose light has been turned out. She has left a memory of an incomparable voice and of an unforgettable spirit. Always smiling, generous and accessible, she lived to sing ..." OH LA! Magazine June 18, 2001

=== Legacy ===
Popular in France and in Europe for more than two decades, Fredericks was relatively unknown in the United States. In the last ten years, her surviving siblings and French language educators have raised awareness about her career by employing Fredericks' music to teach the French language.

In May 2002, a year after her death, the Fredericks family (Connie Fredericks-Malone and brothers, blues icon, Taj Mahal, Edward Fredericks, Richard Fredericks and Osborne Williams) established CDF Music Legacy, LLC, a family company dedicated to preserving their late sister's legacy. CDF Music Legacy secured the world rights to all of Fredericks' solo recordings in France.

Respire, 1999

In 2003, CDF Music Legacy secured permission to create French teaching materials that used Fredericks' catalog of music including the songs recorded with the group, Fredericks Goldman Jones. In tribute to her memory, Fredericks' biography, songs and music videos were transformed into Activity Books that formally combined popular French music and teaching methodology. Tant Qu’Elle Chante, Elle Vit! Apprendre le français grâce à l'héritage de Carole Fredericks was introduced to educators at the American Association of Teachers of French conference in Martinique.

By 2004 her solo albums, Springfield and Couleurs et parfums were available for the first time in the United States. Later that same year, CDF Music Legacy joined forces with Tralco Educational Services (Hamilton, Ontario, Canada) to develop a second Activity Book based on Fredericks' French-language album. In 2005 Couleurs et parfums: Apprendre le français grâce à l'héritage de Carole Fredericks was released in Quebec, Canada, at the American Association of Teachers of French Conference.

Both Tant Qu'Elle Chante, Elle Vit! and Couleurs et parfums Activity Books are used by teachers of French in more than 2000 K-12 schools and 65 colleges and universities throughout the United States, Canada and as far away as Singapore.

On August 18, 2006, the family and a team of French language educators established the Carole D. Fredericks Foundation, Inc., a nonprofit 501(c)(3) charitable organization devoted to promoting the study of French as a second language, the study of francophone cultures and the preservation of Fredericks' musical legacy. The Foundation publishes the activity books, and develops related methodologies that employ her music.

Also in 2006, Fredericks' life and contribution to the study of French were recognized posthumously by the Northeast Conference on the Teaching of Foreign Languages. Fredericks and Taj Mahal received the James W. Dodge Memorial Foreign Language Advocate Award in recognition of the potential of music to foster intercultural communication and to maintain cultural heritages.

Jean-Jacques Goldman wrote the following comments in a note that was read at the NECTFL ceremony.

"I am especially touched by this award given to our friend Carole. Carole was born once in the United States, the land of her parents, of her childhood, of her formation, of her musical culture. She was born a second time in France, the land of her artistic recognition, of her loves and friends, of her pleasures, of her home. Yet a third time she was born in Senegal, the land of her roots, of her heart, perhaps the place where she felt best, the land of her departure, as well.

Although Carole was profoundly American, she was symbol of the mix of cultures that she represented in the most beautiful way: by her voice, through the music. Thank you for this gesture which honors her memory. She lives still in France, through her songs and in many hearts. Through her, it is the America that we love."
- Jean-Jacques Goldman

== Discography ==
=== Solo albums ===
- Black Orchid (1979, Carla Music)
- Springfield (1996, M6 Interactions)
- Couleurs et Parfums (1999, BMG)

=== Studio albums / Groups ===
- Fredericks Goldman Jones (1990, CBS) with Jean-Jacques Goldman and Michael Jones
- Rouge (1993, Columbia) with Red Army Choir, Jean-Jacques Goldman and Michael Jones
- Pluriel: The Best of Fredericks Goldman Jones 1990 - 1996 (2000)

=== Live albums ===
- Sur scène (1992, Columbia) with Jean-Jacques Goldman and Michael Jones
- Du New Morning au Zénith (1995, Columbia) with Jean-Jacques Goldman and Michael Jones

=== Compilations ===
- Les Enfoirés La Compil' (volume 2) (2001 EMI Music)
- Enfoirés en 2000 (2000, BMG)
- Les Enfoirés Dernière édition avant l'an 2000 (1999, BMG)
- Enfoirés en coeur (1998, WEA Music)
- Le Zénith des Enfoirés (1997, BMG)
- La Soirée des Enfoirés 96 (1996, WEA Music)
- Les Enfoirés La Compil' (1996, WEA Music)
- Pluriel 90/96 (1996, Columbia) with Jean-Jacques Goldman and Michael Jones
- Les Enfoirés à l'Opéra-Comique (1995, TSR)
- Les Enfoirés au Grand Rex (1994, WEA Music)
- Les Enfoirés chantent Starmania (1993, Columbia)
- La soirée des Enfoirés à l'Opéra (1992, Columbia)

=== Other Credits ===
Fredericks is credited with performances on these albums:

- Elton John, The One
- Duran Duran, Big Thing, Decade: Greatest Hits, Greatest
- Taj Mahal, Mo' Roots; Music Fuh Ya'; Together; Evolution, Satisfied 'N Tickled Too
- Celine Dion, D'Eux, All The Way – A Decade of Song, The Collector's Series Vol. I, D'eux (The French Album), Falling into You, S'il suffisait d'aimer
- Johnny Hallyday, Sang pour sang; Ça ne change pas un homme, Cadillac
- Jean-Jacques Goldman, Singulier 81 – 89, En passant, Entre gris clair et gris foncé, Fredericks Goldman Jones by Jean-Jacques Goldman
- Liane Foly, Cameleon
- Faudel, Samra
- Julien Clerc, Si j'étais elle
- Vincent Baguian, Mes Chants
- Patricia Kaas, Dans ma chair
- Mylène Farmer, Cendres de Lune, L'Autre...
- Francis Cabrel, Samedi Soir Sur La Terre
- France Gall, Evidemment Integrale
- Hubert-Félix Thiéfaine, H. F. T en Concert, Vol. 1, La Tentation du Bonheur
- Florent Pagny, Florent Pagny [Box Set]
- Vanessa Paradis, Variations sur le même t'aime
- Orchestral Manoeuvres in the Dark, The Pacific Age

Fredericks was the voice of featured characters in two Alan Simon children's albums:

- Les Enfants du Futur (Walt Disney Records/Fr, 1996)
- Le Petit Arthur (Polygram Music/ Les Editions de l'Enchanteur, 1995)

== Filmography ==
=== Movies ===
- Tom est tout seul (1995) .... La chanteuse noire
- Roselyne et les lions (1989) .... La Grenouille

... aka Roselyne and the Lions (UK)

- Les deux crocodiles (1987) .... Mamoudou, femme de Julien

... aka The Two Crocodiles (International: English title)

- Les frères Pétard (1986) .... La chanteuse

... aka The Joint Brothers (USA: review title)

- I Love You (1986) .... Angèle
- Pirates (1986) .... Surprise

=== Self –Television ===
- Taratata 1993 -2001
- Les Restos du Cœur 1992 - 2001

=== Self - Video ===
- Le Prix a Payer (2000)
- Personne ne saurait (1998)
- Respire (1999)
- Qu'est-ce qui t'amene? (1999)
- L'Odyssée des Enfoirés (2001)
- Yannick Noah Enfants De La Terre Tennis – Concert 2000
- Les Enfoirés en 2000
- Jean-Jacques Goldman INTEGRALE DES CLIPS 1981/2000
- Jean-Jacques Goldman Souvenirs de Tournées (2000)

CARNET DE ROUTE 1981 / 1986, TRACES

- les Enfoirés : Dernière édition... avant l'an 2000–1999
- Fredericks Goldman Jones Du Morning Au Zenith (1999)
- Enfoirés en coeur (1998)
- Poetic Lover (1998 Documentary)
- Le Zénith des Enfoirés (1997)
- Run Away Love (1997)
- Change (1996)
- La Soirée des Enfoirés 96 (1996)
- les Enfoirés à l'Opéra-Comique (1995)
- Fredericks Goldman Jones Tours et Détours (1995 Documentary concert video)
- les Enfoirés au Grand Rex (1994)
- les Enfoirés chantent Starmania (1993)
- La Soirée des Enfoirés à l'Opéra (1992)
- En Concert (Mylène Farmer album) (1990 Documentary concert video)

== Important performances ==
2002 Hommage à Carole Fredericks, Time: 5:15 Dailymotion.com

In his 2002 tour, "Un Tour Ensemble", Goldman paid tribute to his fallen friend, Fredericks. During the concert, Michael Jones and Goldman sang Juste Après, a song from the Rouge album made famous by the trio. Midway through the song a screen was lowered and film footage of Carole was shown as her voice is heard singing with them. Dailymotion video

2001 L'AZIZA, Time: 7:59 Dailymotion.com

Early in 2001, Fredericks performs with Roch Voisine the new single release L'Aziza on the studio television show, Taratata. Following the performance, Carole and Roch are interviewed. L'Aziza was written by Daniel Balavoine and suggested by Jean-Jacques Goldman for Voisine's new album. Dailymotion video

1999 Une femme amoureuse / A Woman in Love, Time : 4:32

Liane Foly and Fredericks perform Une femme amoureuse / A Woman in Love before a studio audience for the music television show, Tapis Rouge on France2. Dailymotion.com video

1998 Personne ne saurait, Time 4:37

Fredericks and Poetic Lovers perform Personne ne saurait for M6 Hit television and studio audiences. Personne ne saurait was written by Jean-Jacques Goldman and Jacques Veneruso. Released on the Couleurs et Parfums album. Dailymotion.com video

1995 Knock On Wood, Time 4:47

Celine Dion, Fredericks, Jean-Jacques Goldman, Michael Jones and company perform Eddie Floyd's Knock on Wood for Taratata TV5 studio and television audiences. Video on YouTube

1995 Think, Time: 2:36

Fredericks, Jean-Jacques Goldman, Michael Jones, Yvonne Jones, Becky Bell perform Aretha Franklin's Think live for New Morning audience. Recorded for Fredericks Goldman Jones album, Du New Morning au Zénith. MySpace.com video

1994 Oh Happy Day, Time 5:15

Fredericks, Florent Pagny, Chérubins de Sarcelle choir perform Edwin Hawkins' classic gospel song Oh Happy Day for Les Enfoirés Au Grand Rex live concert and television audiences. Video on YouTube

Le pénitencier / House of the Rising Sun, Time: 4:23

Isabelle Boulay avec/with Fredericks, Tapis Rouge Television show YouTube.com video

== Awards ==
2008 INTERNATIONAL SONGWRITING COMPETITION

- Reason To Stay (Gildas Arzel / Carole Fredericks) - Honorable Mention in the "Blues" category
- Shine (Erick Benzi / Carole Fredericks) - Honorable Mention in the "Gospel / Christian" category

2006 JAMES W. DODGE AWARD

The 53rd Annual Northeast Conference on the Teaching of Foreign Languages awarded Fredericks (posthumous award) and her brother, blues musician Taj Mahal, the James W. Dodge Memorial Foreign Language Advocate Award in recognition of the spotlight they shine on the vast potential of music to foster genuine intercultural communication and to maintain cultural heritages.

2004 JUST PLAIN FOLKS (JPF) MUSIC AWARDS

- Springfield - Best Gospel Album
- Shine (Erick Benzi / Carole Fredericks) - Best Gospel Song
- Save My Soul (Erick Benzi / Carole Fredericks) - Best Gospel Song, 2nd Place
