= Erick Benzi =

French musician and record producer (born 1959)

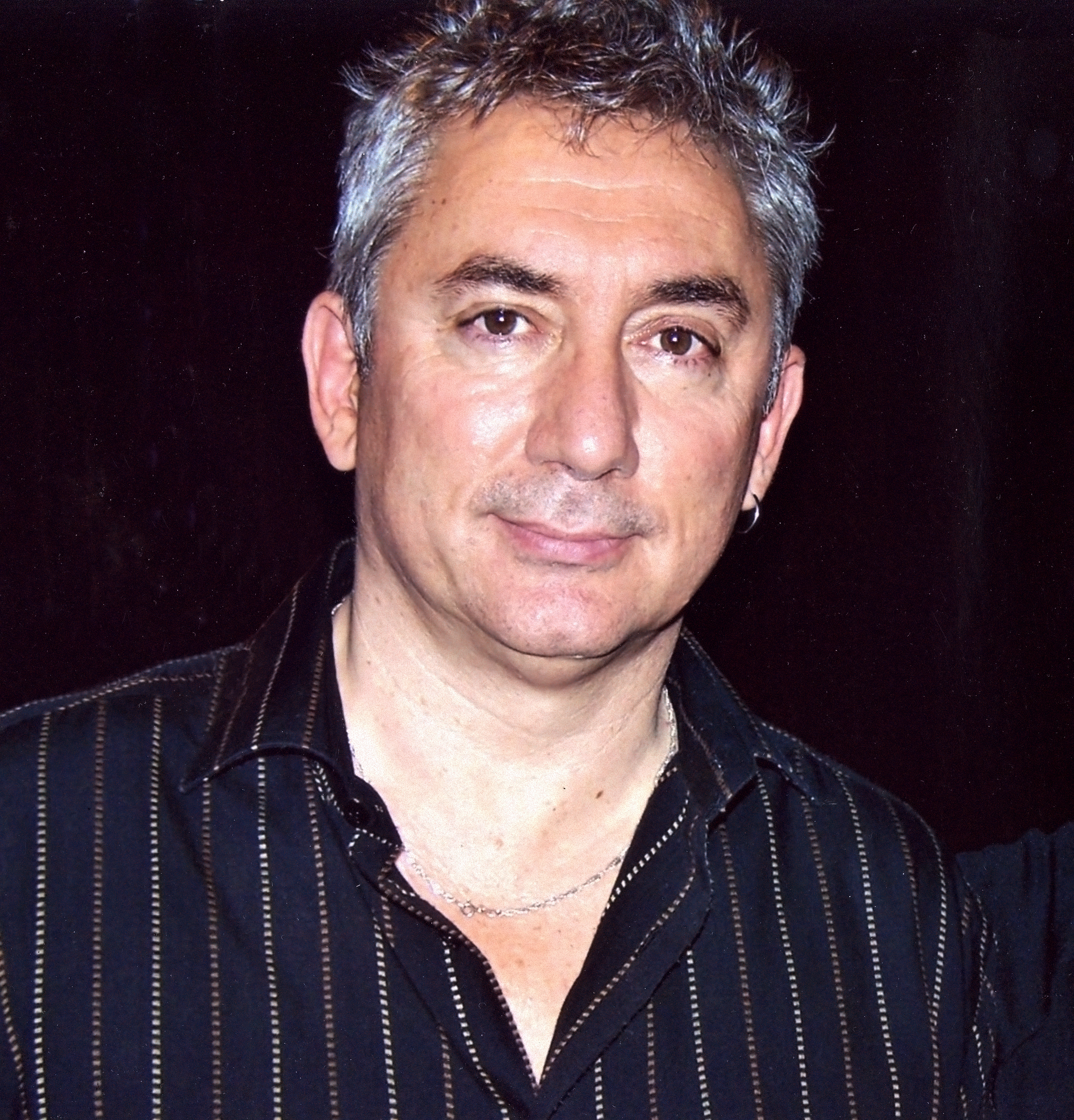
- Benzi in 2009

Background information
- Born: 1 March 1959 (age 67); Marseille, France
- Genres: Pop, French pop
- Occupations: Songwriter; composer; record producer
- Years active: 1990–present
- Website: erickbenzi.com

Erick Benzi (born 1 March 1959) is a French musician, songwriter, composer, and record producer from Marseille.

He was previously part of the duo Die Form, with Gildas Arzel, and the group Canada (with Arzel, Jacques Veneruso, and Gwenn Arzel). Since the 1990s, Benzi has produced albums for a variety of artists, including Jean-Jacques Goldman, Celine Dion, and Anggun.

In 2007, Benzi became a member of the band El Club, with Arzel, Christian Seguret (fr), and Michael Jones.

== Production discography ==
=== Albums ===
- 1992: Rester vrai (Florent Pagny)
- 1993: Rouge (Fredericks/Goldman/Jones)
- 1995: D'eux (Celine Dion)
- 1995: Lorada (Johnny Hallyday)
- 1996: Une à une (Nanette Workman)
- 1996: Bienvenue chez moi (Florent Pagny)
- 1996: Springfield (Carole Fredericks)
- 1997: Snow on the Sahara (Anggun)
- 1997: En passant (Jean-Jacques Goldman)
- 1997: Savoir aimer (Florent Pagny)
- 1998: S'il suffisait d'aimer (Celine Dion)
- 1999: Yannick Noah (Yannick Noah)
- 2000: Chrysalis (Anggun)
- 2000: Autour de nous (Gildas Arzel)
- 2001: Chansons pour les pieds (Jean-Jacques Goldman)
- 2002: Ici et maintenant (Daniel Lévi)
- 2003: 1 fille & 4 types (Celine Dion)
- 2003: Reviens (Garou)
- 2004: Pokhara (Yannick Noah)
- 2005: Double Enfance (Julien Clerc)
- 2006: Charango (Yannick Noah)
- 2007: D'elles (Celine Dion)
- 2007: Plus fort que ça (El Club)
- 2008: duos/duets (Charles Aznavour)
- 2009: Madagascar (Ziskakan)

=== Singles ===
- 1992: "Cherche encore" (Celine Dion)
- 1994: "J'irai quand même" (Florent Pagny)
- 1995: "Bienvenue chez moi" (Florent Pagny)
- 1995: "Lorada" (Johnny Hallyday)
- 1995: "Rester libre" (Johnny Hallyday)
- 1995: "Quand le masque tombe" (Johnny Hallyday)
- 1995: "Ami" (Johnny Hallyday)
- 1995: "Aime-moi" (Johnny Hallyday)
- 1995: "Ne m'oublie pas" (Johnny Hallyday)
- 1996: "Le temps de m'y faire" (Nanette Workman)
- 1997: "La neige au Sahara" (Anggun)
- 1997: "Snow on the Sahara" (Anggun)
- 1997: "La Rose Des Vents" (Anggun)
- 1997: "A Rose in the Wind" (Anggun)
- 1997: "Une place pour moi" (Florent Pagny]
- 1998: "Terre" (Celine Dion)
- 1998: "Papillon" (Celine Dion)
- 1998: "Au Nom De La Lune" (Anggun)
- 1998: "Kembali" (Anggun)
- 1998: "My Sensual Mind" (Anggun)
- 1998: "Life on Mars" (Anggun)
- 1998: "Dors" (Florent Pagny)
- 2000: "Lis dans mes yeux" (Garou)
- 2000: "Sans moi" (Yannick Noah)
- 2000: "J'aime les gosses" (Yannick Noah)
- 2000: "Qui sait?" (Solidays) with Anggun, Patrick Bruel, Stephan Eicher, Faudel, Peter Gabriel, Lââm, Lokua Kanza, Youssou N'Dour, Nourith, Axelle Red, and Zucchero
- 2000: "Un Geste d'Amour" (Anggun)
- 2000: "Still Reminds Me" (Anggun)
- 2000: "Tu Mens" (Anggun)
- 2000: "Chrysalis" (Anggun)
- 2000: "Derriére la Porte" (Anggun)
- 2003: "Apprends-moi" (Celine Dion)
- 2003: "Retiens-moi" (Celine Dion)
- 2003: "Mon homme" (Celine Dion)
- 2003: "Pendant que mes cheveux poussent" (Garou)
- 2003: "Le sucre et le sel" (Garou)
- 2004: "Donne moi une vie" (Yannick Noah)
- 2004: "Là" (Yannick Noah)
- 2005: "Double enfance" (Julien Clerc)
- 2005: "Une vie de rien" (Julien Clerc)
- 2007: "La Diva" (Celine Dion)
- 2007: "Femme comme chacune" (Celine Dion)
- 2007: "Si j'étais quelqu'un" (Celine Dion)
- 2007: "Lettre de George Sand à Alfred Musset" (Celine Dion)
- 2007: "Jack&Judy" (El Club)

== Awards ==
- 2004: Just Plain Folks Music Awards – Best Gospel Album, for Springfield
- 2004: Just Plain Folks Music Awards – Best Gospel Song, for "Shine"
