= Jean-Jacques Goldman =

French singer, musician and record producer (born 1951)

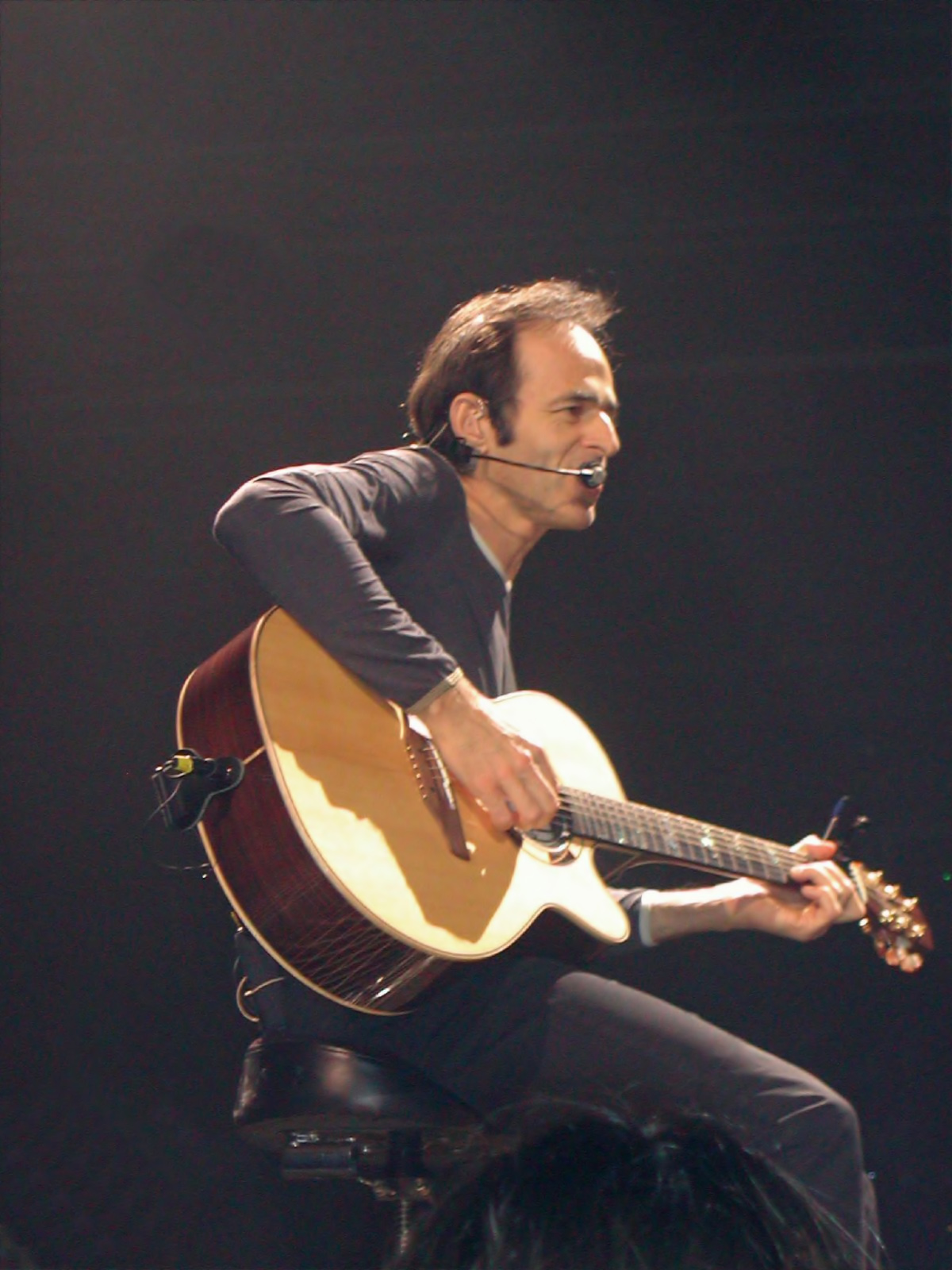
- Goldman in 2002 at Le Zénith in Paris

Background information
- Born: 11 October 1951 (age 75)
- Origin: Paris, France
- Genres: Pop rock, rock, progressive rock, new wave
- Occupation: Singer-songwriter
- Instruments: Vocalist, guitarist, pianist, violinist
- Years active: 1975–2004

Jean-Jacques Goldman (French pronunciation: [ʒɑ̃ʒak ɡɔldman]; born 11 October 1951) is a French retired singer-songwriter and record producer whose work remains hugely popular in the French-speaking world. Since the death of Johnny Hallyday in 2017, he has been the highest-grossing living French pop rock act. Born in Paris and active in the French music scene from 1975, Goldman had a highly successful solo career in the 1980s. As part of the trio Fredericks Goldman Jones, he scored another string of hits in the 1990s.

A founding member of the Les Enfoirés charity collective in 1986 (with which he remained active until 2016), Goldman also wrote successful albums and songs for many artists, including D'eux for Céline Dion, the most successful French-language recording to date. He received his most notable recognition in the English-speaking world with a 1997 Grammy Award for Album of the Year as co-author of three tracks on Dion's album Falling into You. Despite his voluntary retirement from popular music in the early 2000s, Goldman remains highly appreciated and influential in France.

== Biography ==
Born in Paris to Jewish émigrés parents, Polish Jewish father Alter Mojze Goldman (born in Lublin) and German Jewish mother Ruth Ambrunn (born in Munich), Goldman was the third of four children. As a child, he began his music studies on the violin, then the piano. In 1968, he abandoned classical music studies for American rock and roll and folk music, listening to the Beatles, Jimi Hendrix and Aretha Franklin, and emphasising the guitar. His sudden conversion to popular music is loosely chronicled in the song "Un, deux, trois". Meanwhile, Goldman earned a business degree from the École des hautes études commerciales du Nord (EDHEC) in Lille.

In 1972, he met Catherine, his first wife, with whom he had three children. Goldman first entered the French music scene as a member of a progressive rock group named Taï Phong ("great wind" or "typhoon" in Vietnamese), which released its first album in 1975. Their first song, a moderate hit, was "Sister Jane". After three albums in English (on which he sang and played guitar as well as violin), Goldman was determined to write and sing in French, and this led him to leave the band.

Marc Lumbroso saw Goldman's potential and managed to sign him to a five-album contract with Epic Records. That same year, Goldman released his first album, which he wanted to call Démodé ("out of fashion"), but the label refused and it was left untitled. (Démodé has since become its unofficial title.) From the album, "Il suffira d'un signe" was Goldman's first song to become a significant success. In 1982, he released a second album with no title; this time the intended one was Minoritaire, which was also rejected as it was deemed not commercial enough. (It has likewise become the album's unofficial title.) The recording includes several hit singles: "Quand la musique est bonne", "Comme toi" (inspired by a picture of a young Jewish girl who died in a concentration camp, although the heartfelt lyrics never reveal a specific historical context), and "Au bout de mes rêves". This became Goldman's breakthrough album, with about 900,000 copies sold. His third album, released in 1984, was his first with an official title, Positif. The name was the singer's ironic response to the refusal of his previous two titles and spawned new hits such as "Encore un matin" and "Envole-moi". It performed even better, with some 1 million units sold. Goldman's fourth album, Non homologué ("not approved", continuing a trend of ironic and self-deprecating titles), garnered the hit songs "Je marche seul", "Je te donne" (a bilingual rock duet, with Michael Jones singing the English verses and Goldman the French ones) and "Pas toi".

Yet most critics were harsh, deriding Goldman's high-pitched voice as well as his style and demeanour (described as too tame and innocuous) in a collection of softer songs presumably marketed to teenage girls. In reaction, at the end of 1985 Goldman purchased a full-page rebuttal in two major newspapers (Libération and France Soir) in which he displayed excerpts from his harshest reviews. He also appended an ironic message for his fans, once again demonstrating his taste for unassuming self-promotion: "Thanks for coming anyway..." ("Merci d'être venus quand même...").

With the intention of making a farewell album, Goldman recorded a special double album in 1987, Entre gris clair et gris foncé ("Between light grey and dark grey"). It consisted of one disc with new songs and a second disc with songs from his archive. He would reconsider his decision after the double album launched a string of hits: "Elle a fait un bébé toute seule", "Puisque tu pars", "Là-bas" (a duet with Sirima), and "Il changeait la vie". The album became a major success, with more than 2 million units sold. From 1990 to 1995, Goldman went on to perform in a musical trio called Fredericks Goldman Jones with Carole Fredericks (an American singer and chorist who had moved to France in the 1970s, the sister of Taj Mahal) and Michael Jones.

Together they recorded two studio albums, Fredericks / Goldman / Jones in 1990 and Rouge in 1993 (inspired by the fall of the Berlin Wall and the end of the USSR. The title song features the Red Army Choir), one live album, Du New Morning au Zénith, and the trio also released several successful singles: "Nuit", "À nos actes manqués", "Né en 17 à Leidenstadt" (another song about war and how it affects people's lives), "Juste après" (inspired by a TV documentary about the work of Médecins Sans Frontières in Congo that showed a missionary sister's harrowing struggle to save a newborn's life), and "Tu manques".

From 1997 to 2003 he returned to performing as a solo act, releasing two albums, En passant in 1997 and Chansons pour les pieds in 2001, as well as two live albums, Tournée 98 En passant and Un tour ensemble, with new hit songs like "On ira", "Quand tu danses", "Sache que je", "Bonne idée", "Tournent les violons", "Ensemble", "Les choses", "Et l'on n'y peut rien". After a last concert in 2004, he suddenly stopped performing and recording, saying he wanted to spend more time with his family. Goldman had remarried in 2001 to Nathalie Thu Hong-Lagier, a young fan who was then studying mathematics and who would later earn her PhD in pure mathematics.

In 2011, to shut down rumours about a possible musical comeback, he published a short text denying any plans for a new album or tour in the foreseeable future. Since then, Goldman has remained elusive and largely absent from the French media. He continued to compose and produce a few songs for other artists, however, sometimes lending his voice to musical collaborations with others. For example, he recorded "4 Mots sur un piano" with Patrick Fiori and Christine Ricol in 2007; it became a significant hit.

Goldman also had a prominent role in French charity acts from the middle of the 1980s, when in 1985 the noted French comedian Coluche asked him to write a song to promote an initiative that Coluche had just created, Les restos du cœur. These were a group of soup kitchens and food pantries intended to provide free meals and food packages to poor people during the hard winter months. Goldman crafted and produced the eponymous song (reportedly composed in three days), then with Coluche brought in other French celebrities (actors Yves Montand, Catherine Deneuve and Nathalie Baye, soccer player Michel Platini, TV host Michel Drucker) to perform it as an extended troupe. It would be somewhat akin to "We Are the World", the internationally known US musical initiative that same year. For the French project, each celebrity would recite a verse, as none of them were trained singers. It was called Les Enfoirés, originally a very crude and offensive term literally translatable as "covered in diarrhea" but whose colloquial meaning is "the bastards", "the assholes", or (a gimmick Coluche used in his shows) in its more casual sense, "motherfucker". After Coluche's death in 1986, Goldman took over and became the main organizer of the annual charity concert and record. It was a role he filled until 2016, when he decided to quit after a song he wrote for that year's charity album, "Toute la vie", sparked controversy. Some of the song's lyrics were deemed "reactionary", with Goldman being accused of an unfair portrayal of current youth and a desire to create a pointless opposition between young and old generations.

Throughout his career, Goldman has frequently composed for other singers (sometimes using pseudonyms), most notably Johnny Hallyday (the whole Gang album in 1985, among his most successful) and Céline Dion. He wrote and produced two whole albums for her: D'eux in 1995 (released in the US as The French Album), which is still the best-selling French album in history with 10 million copies sold worldwide, and S'il suffisait d'aimer in 1998. He also worked with Dion on the album 1 fille & 4 types along with Gildas Arzel, Jacques Veneruso and Erick Benzi. The songs "If That's What It Takes", "I Don't Know" and "Fly" from her album Falling into You are English-language adaptations of songs Goldman wrote for Dion.

Dion's song "Let's Talk About Love" from the album of the same name is an English adaptation of Goldman's 1987 solo song "Puisque tu pars". He has also collaborated with Patricia Kaas, Garou, Marc Lavoine, Gérald De Palmas, Patrick Fiori, Khaled ("Aïcha"), Lorie and Florent Pagny, as well as jazzman Chet Baker, Supertramp's saxophonist John Helliwell, Joe Cocker ("On my way home" from the album No Ordinary World is an adaptation from "Là-bas"), "king of soul" Ray Charles and American songwriter Diane Warren.

On 19 November 2012, Génération Goldman, a tribute album to Goldman, was released on the MyMajorCompany France and M6 Music labels, with a number of artists interpreting Goldman's songs. A second volume followed in 2013.

In December 2023, Goldman's song "Pense à nous" premiered on cellist Gautier Capuçon's album Destination Paris. It was sung by children's choirs of the Orchestre à l'École Association and the Maîtrise de Radio France de Paris and Bondy.

=== Personal life ===
From 1975 to 1997, Goldman was married to Catherine Morlet, a psychologist. In 2001, he married Nathalie Thu Hong-Lagier, a mathematician. He is the father of six: Caroline (b. 1975), Michaël (b. 1979) and Nina (b. 1985) with Morlet, and Maya (b. 2004), Kimi (b. 2005) and Rose (b. 2007) with Thu Hong-Lagier.

His son Michael Goldman is one of the co-founders of My Major Company France, a leading fan-funded music label.

His younger brother Robert Goldman is also a songwriter (often known as J. Kapler).

His half-brother Pierre Goldman, a left-wing intellectual and convicted robber later acquitted by a French court, was murdered in mysterious circumstances in Paris in 1979.

== Philanthropy ==
Goldman was the leader of the Les Enfoirés charity ensemble from 1986 to 2016.

== Discography ==
=== Solo ===
- A l'envers (a.k.a. Démodé) (1981)
- Quand la musique est bonne (a.k.a. Minoritaire) (1982)
- Positif (1984)
- Non homologué (1985)
- Entre gris clair et gris foncé (1987)
- En passant (1997)
- Chansons pour les pieds (2001)

=== Taï Phong ===
- Taï Phong (1975)
- Windows (1976)
- Last Flight (1979)

=== Fredericks Goldman Jones ===
- Fredericks Goldman Jones (1990)
- Rouge (1993)

Preceded by Michel Jonasz	Victoires de la Musique; Male artist of the year 1986	Succeeded by Johnny Hallyday
