= 2001 in music =

This is a list of notable events in music that took place in the year 2001.

3.2 billion units were sold with a value of US$33.7 billion. DVD-Audio and Super Audio CD first rose to prominence in 2001, with approximately 600 titles available in these formats. Portable music grew in popularity after Apple Inc. released the iTunes media library on January 9 and the first iPod music player device on October 23. Worldwide, the best-selling albums were Hybrid Theory (2000) by Linkin Park, No Angel (1999) by Dido, and Survivor (2001) by Destiny's Child. The best-selling non-English album was Cieli di Toscana (transl. Tuscan Skies; 2001) by Italian tenor Andrea Bocelli, which topped the charts in the Netherlands and Sweden and was the 23rd best-selling album globally.

== Specific locations ==
- 2001 in British music
- 2001 in Norwegian music
- 2001 in Scandinavian music
- 2001 in South Korean music

== Specific genres ==
- 2001 in classical music
- 2001 in country music
- 2001 in heavy metal music
- 2001 in hip-hop
- 2001 in jazz
- 2001 in Latin music
- 2001 in progressive rock

== Events ==
=== January ===
- January 9 – Apple Inc. introduces the iTunes media player.
- January 12–21 – Rock in Rio 3 is held in Rio de Janeiro, Brazil. Headlining acts consist of Sting, R.E.M., 'N Sync, Iron Maiden, Neil Young, Red Hot Chili Peppers and a new line-up of Guns N' Roses. Several Brazilian bands removed themselves from the festival in protest over fewer timeing allocated to Brazilian acts.
- January 17 – Bass player Jason Newsted leaves Metallica after 14 years with the band.
- January 19–February 4 – The Big Day Out festival takes place in Australia and New Zealand, headlined by Rammstein (in all venues) and Limp Bizkit (in Auckland, the Gold Coast, and Sydney).
- January 26 – A crowd crush occurs during a set by Limp Bizkit at the Sydney Big Day Out music festival. Jessica Michalik is killed and the band subsequently leaves the country after threats to their safety.

=== February ===
- February 1
  - CFXJ (Flow 93.5), Canada's first urban music station, solt-launches as a testing signal with its official debut on March 1. The station is considered a breakthrough for Canadian hip-hop and R&B musicians.
  - Jennifer Lopez becomes first female artist to have both a number one album (J.Lo) and a number one film (The Wedding Planner) in the same week.
- February 6 – Don Felder is fired from the Eagles. Felder sues the band for wrongful termination, and is countersued by Don Henley and Glenn Frey for breach of contract. The suits are settled out of court.
- February 13 – Peter Frampton receives the Orville H. Gibson Lifetime Achievement Award.
- February 17 – Manic Street Preachers become the first western rock band to play in Cuba. Fidel Castro is in attendance.
- February 18 – James Taylor marries Caroline "Kim" Smedvig, director of public relations and marketing for the Boston Symphony Orchestra, marking Taylor's third marriage.
- February 21 – The 43rd Annual Grammy Awards are presented in Los Angeles, hosted by Jon Stewart. Several artists win three awards each: Steely Dan (who win Album of the Year for Two Against Nature), U2 (who win both Record of the Year and Song of the Year for "Beautiful Day"), Dr. Dre, Eminem and Faith Hill. Shelby Lynne wins Best New Artist.
- February 28 – Courtney Love sues to end her contract with Vivendi Universal, on the grounds that music industry contracts are unfairly long compared to those in other industries.

=== March ===
- March 1 – Collin Raye is awarded the Artist Humanitarian Award from Country Radio Broadcasters. The award was given in recognition of Raye's work on behalf of a number of different charitable organizations including Childhelp USA, USA Weekend's Make A Difference Day and a Native American organization.
- March 8 – Melanie C announces she does not intend to do any more work with the Spice Girls. Although the group denies of its separation, it would not be active again until 2007.
- March 9
  - Janet Jackson's single "All for You" becomes the first song to be added to every station in three mainstream radio formats within its first week of release. It was also the highest debut for a single not commercially available in both the United States and France.
  - Eric Singer replaces Peter Criss as the drummer for Kiss as the band continues its farewell tour in Yokohama, Japan. Singer wears the "Catman" make-up, ending the band's tradition of creating new make-up and personas for replacement members.
- March 13 – Janet Jackson is honored as the first ever MTV Icon.
- March 14 – The Court of Appeals in Rome finds Michael Jackson not guilty of plagiarism, reversing a decision made in 1999 by a lower court. Italian songwriter Albano Carrisi had claimed that Jackson's "Will You Be There" was a copy of his song "I Cigni Di Balaka."
- March 16 – Sean "Puffy" Combs is acquitted on all charges stemming from a December 1999 nightclub shooting in Manhattan. An artist on Combs' Bad Boy Records label, Shyne, is convicted of two counts of assault as well as reckless endangerment and gun possession.
- March 20 – Toadies release Hell Below/Stars Above, the band's first album in nearly seven years. The band announces its disbandment five months later.
- March 24 – John Connolly of Sevendust marries Lori Kirkley.
- March 26
  - Gorillaz release their first studio album Gorillaz. The album reached number three in the UK, and was an unexpected success in the US, peaking at number 14 and selling over seven million copies worldwide by 2007. The group would win an entry in the Guinness Book of World Records as the Most Successful Virtual Band.
  - Aerosmith release their thirteenth studio album, Just Push Play, charting at number 2 in the US Billboard 200.
- March 27
  - Train release their second studio album, Drops of Jupiter. The album's title track peaked at number 5 in the US Billboard Hot 100.
- March 28
  - Sergei Rachmaninoff's Piano Concerto No. 2 replaces Max Bruch's violin concerto at number one in the Classic FM Hall of Fame.
  - Two big selling albums: Hikaru Utada's Distance and Ayumi Hamasaki's A Best are released on the same date. Their debut week sales are 3,002,720 and 2,874,870, respectively, setting the world's number one and number two one-week album sales records.

=== April–May ===
- April 2 – The Bee Gees release their twenty-second studio album This Is Where I Came In, the last to feature all three Gibb brothers.
- April 3 – Mariah Carey signs a blockbuster contract with Virgin Records, worth $80 million for four albums.
- April 4 – Original Zombies lead singer Colin Blunstone and keyboardist Rod Argent reunite for a two-part performance at London's Jazz Cafe, the first time the two had performed together in over 30 years.
- April 14 – Janet Jackson's "All for You" reaches number one on the Billboard Hot 100 and remains atop the chart for seven consecutive weeks. It becomes the longest reigning number one single of the year.
- April 21 – The first Top Chinese Music Awards ceremony is held.
- April 24 – Janet Jackson releases her seventh studio album, All for You. It becomes her fifth consecutive album to debut at number one, with sales exceeding 600,000 copies. It receives three Grammy Award nominations, winning for Best Dance Recording.
- April 28 – The second Coachella Valley Music and Arts Festival takes place in California as a single-day event. Headlined by Jane's Addiction, the lineup also features Weezer, The Roots, Gang Starr, Iggy Pop, The Orb, The Dandy Warhols and Mos Def.
- May 1
  - Huey Lewis and the News releases the album Plan B, their first album of new material in a decade.
  - The 4th EJCF is held in Basel, after which the event would go on hiatus until 2004.
- May 12 – Joey Fatone of 'N Sync injures his leg in a trap door during rehearsals for the Celebrity Tour.
  - The 46th Eurovision Song Contest, held at Parken Stadium in Copenhagen, Denmark, is won by Tanel Padar and Dave Benton, featuring hip-hop group 2XL. They represented Estonia with the song "Everybody", marking the first victory for one of the Baltic states and one of the former Soviet republics. At 50 years old, Benton also becomes the oldest contestant, as well as the first black person, to win Eurovision.
- May 15
  - Charley Pride's A Tribute to Jim Reeves is the first compact disc to have copy protection.
  - The Go-Go's release their first album in 17 years, God Bless the Go-Go's.
- May 22 – Mötley Crüe publishes their collective autobiography The Dirt.

=== June ===
- June 1 – Christina Aguilera scores her fourth number one single on the Billboard Hot 100 for "Lady Marmalade" a collaboration with Lil' Kim, Mýa, and Pink. The video wins the MTV Video Music Award for Video of the Year.
- June 5
  - Radiohead releases their fifth studio album, Amnesiac.
  - Drowning Pool releases their 1st studio album, Sinner. After the 9/11 attacks, the single "Bodies" is listed on the list of songs deemed inappropriate by Clear Channel.
- June 9 – Madonna begins her first concert tour in eight years, the Drowned World Tour, in Barcelona, Spain.
- June 12
  - Blink-182 release their fourth studio album Take Off Your Pants and Jacket which would later sell 14 million copies worldwide. This was the band's second successful album.
  - Electric Light Orchestra release Zoom, their first album in 15 years.
- June 15 – Bad Religion drummer Bobby Schayer, who had been with the band since 1991, leaves the band and departs from music after experiencing a "most unfortunate career-ending injury". He is replaced by current drummer Brooks Wackerman. By this time, Bad Religion depart from Atlantic Records and had returned to their original label Epitaph, and founding guitarist Brett Gurewitz had just rejoined the band after a seven-year hiatus.
- June 16 – The Los Angeles radio station KROQ-FM airs the 9th Annual of the Weenie Roast show with Blink-182, Coldplay, Crazy Town, The Cult, Disturbed, Jane's Addiction, Linkin Park, The Living End, New Found Glory, Pennywise, Papa Roach, Stabbing Westward, Staind, Stone Temple Pilots, Sum 41 and 311.
- June 24 – Jazz pianist John Hicks marries flautist Elise Wood.

=== July ===
- July 2
  - Willy Denzey makes his first appearance at Les Francofolies de La Rochelle.
  - Napster shuts down its entire network in order to comply with a court injunction ordering it to suspend the trading of copyrighted files.
- July 9 – Backstreet Boys put their Black & Blue summer tour on hold to allow AJ McLean to enter a rehabilitation facility to deal with alcoholism and depression.
- July 16 – Mariah Carey releases "Loverboy"; it eventually became the best-selling song of 2001.
- July 17–22 – The fourth Yoyo A Go Go punk and indie rock festival opens in Olympia, Washington.
- July 19 – Ol' Dirty Bastard is sentenced to two to four years in prison for drug possession.
- July 21 – The first annual Splendour in the Grass music festival is held in Byron Bay, New South Wales, headlined by Powderfinger.
- July 25 – Mariah Carey enters a hospital for what a spokesperson terms "extreme exhaustion". Carey had exhibited several incidents of bizarre behavior during the previous week, including performing a strange striptease during an unscheduled visit to MTV's Total Request Live and posting a rambling message on her website in which she wrote, "I don't know what's going on with life".

=== August ===
- August 3 – Whitney Houston signs the largest contract in music history with Arista Records, a six-album deal worth over $100 million.
- August 6 – Death Row Records founder Suge Knight is released from prison after serving five years of a nine-year sentence for a parole violation.
- August 7 – Aaron Carter releases his third studio album (second under Jive Records) Oh Aaron.
- August 13 – Two weeks before its official release, Spider One of Powerman 5000 pulls Anyone for Doomsday? from its original release date due to the album sounding similar to their previous release Tonight the Stars Revolt!. The album would later be released on their website. Two months later, Al 3 and Dorian 27 leave the band.
- August 14 – Lifer releases their self-titled debut album, produced by Alex Lifeson of the Prog Rock band Rush, the album was unsuccessful and would become their only album.
- August 15 – Wilco signs a buy-out deal with Reprise Records after the label rejects the Yankee Hotel Foxtrot album and the band refuses to make any changes. Wilco leaves with the rights to the album in their possession.
- August 22 – Longtime guitarist Roland Grapow and drummer Uli Kusch are fired from German power metal band Helloween.
- August 25 – A Cessna 402 carrying nine people, including R&B singer Aaliyah, crashes in the Bahamas, killing all aboard.

=== September ===
- September 4 – The second studio album from American band System of a Down, Toxicity, is released worldwide. After the 9/11 attacks, the single "Chop Suey!" is listed on the list of songs deemed inappropriate by Clear Channel.
- September 5 – A performance of John Cage's As Slow as Possible on a specially-built organ in Sankt-Burchardi-Church in Halberstadt, Germany, scheduled to last until the year 2640 begins with an 18-month pause.
- September 6 – At the 2001 MTV Video Music Awards, Britney Spears performs her new single "I'm a Slave 4 U" in a revealing outfit and featuring a number of exotic animals including a white and live albino Burmese python on her shoulder, leading to a great deal of criticism from animal rights organisation PETA. Nevertheless, MTV named the performance as the most memorable moment in VMA history.
- September 7-10 – The Michael Jackson: 30th Anniversary Celebration tribute concerts are held at Madison Square Garden in New York City.
- September 10 – Blink-182 film a video for "Stay Together for the Kids", featuring the band playing in a derelict house. The September 11 attacks on the following day persuade the band to abandon the attempt and film a different video for the song.
- September 11 –
  - Jay-Z's The Blueprint is released a week earlier than initially planned in order to combat bootlegging.
  - The September 11 attacks result in the cancellation or postponement of many musical events, due to the halting of many commercial flights and the somber mood of communities around the world:
    - MTV and VH1 suspend regular programming to carry a newsfeed from CBS, and the 2001 Latin Grammy Awards broadcast is canceled.
    - Sting, who had planned to stream a performance in Italy on the Internet, reduces the webcast to one song, "Fragile".
    - Enya's "Only Time" becomes backdrop for CNN.
    - The MuchMusic Video Awards scheduled for September 23 are also canceled.
- September 14 – Clear Channel Communications issues a controversial memorandum to its radio stations containing a list of 165 songs considered "lyrically questionable" in the aftermath of the September 11 attacks. The list includes "Knockin' on Heaven's Door", all songs by Rage Against the Machine and John Lennon's "Imagine".
- September 21 – America: A Tribute to Heroes airs uninterrupted on all major networks. The solemn concert, held ten days after the September 11 attacks, included performances by Bruce Springsteen, Tom Petty, Celine Dion, Neil Young, Stevie Wonder, Alicia Keys, Dave Matthews, Faith Hill, Mariah Carey, and others.
- September 25 – XM Satellite Radio is launched.
- September 29
  - The First International Accordion Festival begins at La Villita in San Antonio, Texas, celebrating the multicultural traditions of the accordion with artists performing German, Colombian, Irish, Argentinian tango, Cajun-zydeco, Dominican merengue and conjunto-Tejano music.
  - Jennifer Lopez marries backup dancer Cris Judd. The marriage would end in June 2002.

=== October ===
- October 6
  - Burton C. Bell gets into a fight with his bandmate Dino Cazares about a manager they fired. The event triggers Fear Factory to separate.
  - Pop Idol premieres on ITV.
- October 9 – The first CD in the Kidz Bop series, consisting of Top 40 hits sung by children, is released.
- October 10 – Heavy metal band Anthrax issues a press release in response to the 2001 anthrax attacks jokingly stating that they would be changing the name of the group to "Basket Full of Puppies". It concludes, "we don't want to change the name of the band, not because it would be a pain in the ass, but because we hope that no further negative events will happen and it won't be necessary. We hope and pray that this problem goes away quietly and we all grow old and fat together." The band has reported increased traffic to their website due to internet users going to anthrax.com looking for information about the disease.
- October 12 – Wes Borland leaves Limp Bizkit.
- October 16 – Michael Jackson releases special editions of his albums Off the Wall, Thriller, Bad and Dangerous, to celebrate his thirtieth anniversary as a solo musician.
- October 20
  - The Concert for New York City airs on VH1, with performances by Paul McCartney, The Rolling Stones, Bon Jovi, The Who, Billy Joel and others.
  - Volunteers For America benefit concert is held in Atlanta, hosted by Drew Carey with performances by Edgar Winter Group, Mark Farner, Jack Blades, John Waite, The Knack, Eddie Money, Peter Frampton, Survivor, Kansas, Journey, Styx, REO Speedwagon, Bad Company, Lynyrd Skynyrd, and others.
- October 21
  - United We Stand: What More Can I Give benefit concert is held at RFK Stadium in Washington, D.C., with performances by Michael Jackson, Aerosmith, Mariah Carey, James Brown, Backstreet Boys, 'N Sync, and others.
  - Volunteers For America benefit concert is held at Smirnoff Music Centre in Dallas, Texas, hosted by Drew Carey with performances by Edgar Winter Group, Mark Farner, Jack Blades, John Waite, The Knack, Eddie Money, Peter Frampton, Survivor, Kansas, Journey, Styx, REO Speedwagon, Bad Company, and others.
- October 23
  - The Backstreet Boys release their first compilation album The Hits: Chapter One.
  - The first iPod is announced by Apple Inc.
  - Incubus releases their third full-length major label album titled Morning View. It debuted on the Billboard Top 200 at the number two spot with 266,000 copies sold in its first week. This was the highest placement for Incubus. At the same time, "Wish You Were Here" was at number two on the Modern Rock Charts, and "Drive" sat at number 48 on the Hot 100 chart.
- October 25 – Quarashi performs a live concert with the Iceland Symphony Orchestra (the band Botnleðja also performed) in the Háskólabíó in Reykjavík, Iceland, which is notable for being the first time that a rap act performed a live concert with the Iceland Symphony Orchestra. Quarashi perform seven songs from their then-upcoming album, Jinx.
- October 30 – Michael Jackson releases Invincible, his first studio album since 1995 and his tenth studio album overall. While the album debuts at number one, its success is limited due to a feud between Jackson and Sony Music Entertainment over the rights to his backcatalog, culminating in Jackson accusing the company of racial discrimination. The album would end up being Jackson's last, with later musical efforts being offset by a second series of child molestation allegations in 2003, a trial over the allegations in 2005, and his death on the eve of his This Is It concert residency in June 2009.
- October 31 – Britney Spears releases her third studio album Britney.

=== November–December ===
- November 1
  - The governing body of the UK singles chart, Chart Information Network Ltd. (CIN), changes its name to The Official UK Charts Company.
  - Britney Spears starts her Dream Within a Dream Tour, in support her self-titled third studio album. The tour was accompanied by many extravagant special effect including a water screen that pumped two tons of water into the stage during the encore. The tour was commercial success, all the venues on the 2001 leg are largely sold out and grossed $43.7 million from 68 show.
- November 5 – In the UK, BMG becomes the first major label to release a compact disc with copy protection, Natalie Imbruglia's White Lilies Island. Within two weeks BMG announces they would reissue the disc without the copy protection, due to complaints from consumers who were unable to play the CDs in their personal computers.
- November 6
  - Britney Spears' third album, Britney debuts at number one, making her the first female artist to have her first three albums enter the US charts at number one.
  - Nu-Metal Band Dope release their second studio album Life.
- November 29 – Former The Beatles member George Harrison dies from lung cancer at the age of 58.
- December 1 – Mike Turner quits Our Lady Peace.
- December 4 – Gospel music singer Yolanda Adams releases her eighth studio album Believe.
- December 12 – Surviving Nirvana members Krist Novoselic and Dave Grohl sue Courtney Love in an effort to oust her from the board controlling the management of the band's affairs, calling her "irrational, mercurial, self-centered, unmanageable, inconsistent and unpredictable". The legal battle over the band's legacy has blocked the release of a planned Nirvana box set containing the unreleased track "You Know You're Right".

=== Also in 2001 ===
- The Area One music festival is held featuring a variety of artists including Moby, Incubus, Outkast, New Order, Nelly Furtado, The Roots, Rinôçérôse, Paul Oakenfold, and Carl Cox.
- The Republic of France awards Jean-Yves Thibaudet the honour of Chevalier de l'Ordre des Arts et des Lettres.
- Deporitaz releases Microwave this CD, his second album, on MP3.com.
- Sean Beasley joins Dying Fetus.

== Bands formed ==
- See Musical groups established in 2001

== Bands disbanded ==
- See Musical groups disestablished in 2001

== Bands reformed ==
- Army of Lovers
- Dead Kennedys
- Devourment
- Level 42
- The Monkees
- Maroon 5
- Roxy Music
- Zebra
- Sunny Day Real Estate

== Albums released ==
=== January–March ===
| Date | | Album | Artist | Notes |
|---|---|---|---|---|
| J A N U A R Y | 1 | Çà et là du Japon | Pizzicato Five | - |
| J A N U A R Y | 1 | Kelly Chen BPM Dance Collection Volume 4 | Kelly Chen | Compilation |
| J A N U A R Y | 9 | The Houseman Cometh! | Theryl DeClouet | Debut |
| J A N U A R Y | 9 | Oz | Various Artists | TV Soundtrack |
| J A N U A R Y | 16 | Alcohol Fueled Brewtality | Black Label Society | - |
| J A N U A R Y | 16 | Azure Ray | Azure Ray | - |
| J A N U A R Y | 16 | From Long Beach 2 Fillmoe | Daz Dillinger & J.T. the Bigga Figga | - |
| J A N U A R Y | 16 | Scavengers | Calla | - |
| J A N U A R Y | 22 | Crystal Empire | Freedom Call | - |
| J A N U A R Y | 22 | Hush! | Ana Popović | Solo debut |
| J A N U A R Y | 22 | Things We Lost in the Fire | Low | - |
| J A N U A R Y | 23 | A Better Version of Me | Rainer Maria | - |
| J A N U A R Y | 23 | J.Lo | Jennifer Lopez | - |
| J A N U A R Y | 23 | Little Sparrow | Dolly Parton | - |
| J A N U A R Y | 23 | 2000 Years of Human Error | Godhead | - |
| J A N U A R Y | 23 | Anthology | Obituary | Compilation |
| J A N U A R Y | 23 | Carnival Diablos | Annihilator | - |
| J A N U A R Y | 23 | Day of the Death | Death by Stereo | - |
| J A N U A R Y | 23 | The Donnas Turn 21 | The Donnas | - |
| J A N U A R Y | 23 | It Was All a Dream | Dream | - |
| J A N U A R Y | 23 | O-Town | O-Town | - |
| J A N U A R Y | 23 | The Very Best of Daryl Hall & John Oates | Hall & Oates | Compilation |
| J A N U A R Y | 23 | The World According to Gob | Gob | - |
| J A N U A R Y | 24 | Zen | DJ Krush | - |
| J A N U A R Y | 29 | Nuclear Fire | Primal Fear | Germany |
| J A N U A R Y | 30 | The Best of Tevin Campbell | Tevin Campbell | Compilation |
| J A N U A R Y | 30 | Blues Dream | Bill Frisell | - |
| J A N U A R Y | 30 | Dog in the Sand | Frank Black and the Catholics | - |
| J A N U A R Y | 30 | I Need You | LeAnn Rimes | Compilation |
| J A N U A R Y | 30 | More | Vitamin C | - |
| J A N U A R Y | 30 | You Don't Have to Be Blood to Be Family | Throwdown | - |
| F E B R U A R Y | 1 | Brushfire Fairytales | Jack Johnson | Debut |
| F E B R U A R Y | 1 | Lucy Ford: The Atmosphere EP's | Atmosphere | EP |
| F E B R U A R Y | 5 | The Anthology... So Far | Ringo Starr | Live |
| F E B R U A R Y | 5 | The Knife | The Knife | - |
| F E B R U A R Y | 6 | Dither | Moe | - |
| F E B R U A R Y | 6 | End Is Forever | The Ataris | - |
| F E B R U A R Y | 6 | Greatest Hits Vol. II | Gloria Estefan | Compilation |
| F E B R U A R Y | 6 | Risen | O.A.R. | - |
| F E B R U A R Y | 6 | Samra | Faudel | - |
| F E B R U A R Y | 6 | Simply Mortified | BS 2000 | - |
| F E B R U A R Y | 6 | Sing Loud, Sing Proud! | Dropkick Murphys | - |
| F E B R U A R Y | 6 | 604 | Ladytron | - |
| F E B R U A R Y | 6 | Today's Empires, Tomorrow's Ashes | Propagandhi | - |
| F E B R U A R Y | 6 | You Had It Coming | Jeff Beck | - |
| F E B R U A R Y | 12 | Hits II: Ganked & Gaffled | Spice 1 | Compilation |
| F E B R U A R Y | 13 | Conquering Ruler | The Specials | Covers album |
| F E B R U A R Y | 13 | Firestarr | Fredro Starr | - |
| F E B R U A R Y | 13 | Stephen Malkmus | Stephen Malkmus and the Jicks | - |
| F E B R U A R Y | 13 | To Record Only Water for Ten Days | John Frusciante | - |
| F E B R U A R Y | 13 | Road Movies | Land | - |
| F E B R U A R Y | 15 | Toki no Tsubasa | Zard | - |
| F E B R U A R Y | 19 | Another Late Night: Fila Brazillia | Fila Brazillia | - |
| F E B R U A R Y | 20 | A Predator's Portrait | Soilwork | - |
| F E B R U A R Y | 20 | Compuphonic | Echo Image | Debut |
| F E B R U A R Y | 20 | Field Commander Cohen: Tour of 1979 | Leonard Cohen | Live |
| F E B R U A R Y | 20 | Girls Can Tell | Spoon | - |
| F E B R U A R Y | 20 | Newness Ends | The New Year | Debut |
| F E B R U A R Y | 20 | Standards | Tortoise | - |
| F E B R U A R Y | 20 | Tim Rushlow | Tim Rushlow | - |
| F E B R U A R Y | 20 | Wasted Days | The Slackers | - |
| F E B R U A R Y | 26 | Any Other City | Life Without Buildings | Debut |
| F E B R U A R Y | 26 | Believe in Nothing | Paradise Lost | - |
| F E B R U A R Y | 26 | Sleepwalking | Rae & Christian | - |
| F E B R U A R Y | 26 | Teen Spirit | A*Teens | - |
| F E B R U A R Y | 26 | Welcome 2 Detroit | J Dilla | Debut |
| F E B R U A R Y | 27 | American Hi-Fi | American Hi-Fi | Debut |
| F E B R U A R Y | 27 | A Bum Note and a Bead of Sweat | Baboon | Live |
| F E B R U A R Y | 27 | Cydonia | The Orb | - |
| F E B R U A R Y | 27 | Everyday | Dave Matthews Band | - |
| F E B R U A R Y | 27 | Farstucker | Lords of Acid | - |
| F E B R U A R Y | 27 | Mista Don't Play: Everythangs Workin | Project Pat | - |
| F E B R U A R Y | 27 | My World, My Way | Silkk the Shocker | - |
| F E B R U A R Y | 27 | Phantom Moon | Duncan Sheik | - |
| F E B R U A R Y | 27 | The Professional 2 | DJ Clue | - |
| F E B R U A R Y | 27 | A Rollins in the Wry | Henry Rollins | Live |
| F E B R U A R Y | 27 | Self-Titled | Zao | - |
| F E B R U A R Y | 27 | Who I Am | Jessica Andrews | - |
| F E B R U A R Y | ? | Only Time Knows | Bearfoot Bluegrass | Debut album |
| M A R C H | 1 | Another Late Night: Rae & Christian | Rae & Christian | Compilation |
| M A R C H | 1 | B.P. Empire | Infected Mushroom | - |
| M A R C H | 1 | Crime as Forgiven by Against Me! | Against Me! | EP |
| M A R C H | 2 | Death's Design | Diabolical Masquerade | - |
| M A R C H | 5 | Going Inside | John Frusciante | EP |
| M A R C H | 5 | Just Push Play | Aerosmith | - |
| M A R C H | 5 | Reptile | Eric Clapton | - |
| M A R C H | 5 | The Optimist LP | Turin Brakes | LP |
| M A R C H | 5 | When It's All Over We Still Have to Clear Up | Snow Patrol | - |
| M A R C H | 6 | Katy Hudson | Katy Hudson | Debut album |
| M A R C H | 6 | Accepted Eclectic | Aceyalone | - |
| M A R C H | 6 | Anarchists of Good Taste | Dog Fashion Disco | - |
| M A R C H | 6 | ANThology | Alien Ant Farm | - |
| M A R C H | 6 | Dark Assault | Iron Savior | - |
| M A R C H | 6 | From Wisdom to Hate | Gorguts | - |
| M A R C H | 6 | Feel Good Lost | Broken Social Scene | - |
| M A R C H | 6 | The Greenhornes | The Greenhornes | - |
| M A R C H | 6 | Identity Crisis | Thrice | - |
| M A R C H | 6 | Insanity | Darkane | - |
| M A R C H | 6 | Loco | Fun Lovin' Criminals | - |
| M A R C H | 6 | Madre de Dios | Dozer | - |
| M A R C H | 6 | Mars/Venus | Koffee Brown | - |
| M A R C H | 6 | Musipal | Wagon Christ | - |
| M A R C H | 6 | Quiet Is the New Loud | Kings of Convenience | - |
| M A R C H | 6 | Scorpion | Eve | - |
| M A R C H | 6 | SGNL 05 | Isis | EP |
| M A R C H | 6 | Unwind | Oleander | - |
| M A R C H | 7 | Insomnia | Chihiro Onitsuka | - |
| M A R C H | 7 | Jumping into the World | BoA | EP |
| M A R C H | 9 | Group Sounds | Rocket from the Crypt | - |
| M A R C H | 9 | One Nil | Neil Finn | - |
| M A R C H | 12 | Awakening the World | Lost Horizon | Sweden |
| M A R C H | 12 | Back to the Blues | Gary Moore | - |
| M A R C H | 12 | Blackwater Park | Opeth | - |
| M A R C H | 12 | Discovery | Daft Punk | - |
| M A R C H | 12 | Human | Rod Stewart | - |
| M A R C H | 12 | Regeneration | The Divine Comedy | - |
| M A R C H | 12 | Sunny Border Blue | Kristin Hersh | - |
| M A R C H | 12 | Superstars and Cannonballs | Savage Garden | VHS/DVD |
| M A R C H | 12 | Timeless Departure | Skyfire | - |
| M A R C H | 13 | All About Chemistry | Semisonic | - |
| M A R C H | 13 | Tantric | Tantric | - |
| M A R C H | 13 | Gourmandises | Alizée | - |
| M A R C H | 13 | Let It Fall | Sean Watkins | - |
| M A R C H | 13 | Trick Pony | Trick Pony | - |
| M A R C H | 19 | 456132015 | De Facto | EP |
| M A R C H | 19 | Ease Down the Road | Bonnie "Prince" Billy | - |
| M A R C H | 19 | Know Your Enemy | Manic Street Preachers | - |
| M A R C H | 19 | Terra Incognita | Gojira | Debut |
| M A R C H | 20 | EP 2 | Zero 7 | EP |
| M A R C H | 20 | Exit Wounds: The Album | Various Artists | Soundtrack |
| M A R C H | 20 | Lars Frederiksen and the Bastards | Lars Frederiksen and the Bastards | - |
| M A R C H | 20 | The Gift | Bizzy Bone | - |
| M A R C H | 20 | Healing | Ünloco | Debut |
| M A R C H | 20 | Hypothetical | Threshold | - |
| M A R C H | 20 | Nation | Sepultura | - |
| M A R C H | 20 | New Killer America | Skrape | Debut |
| M A R C H | 20 | Part III | 112 | - |
| M A R C H | 20 | Hell Below/Stars Above | Toadies | - |
| M A R C H | 20 | The Places You Have Come to Fear the Most | Dashboard Confessional | - |
| M A R C H | 20 | Puritanical Euphoric Misanthropia | Dimmu Borgir | - |
| M A R C H | 20 | Satellite Rides | Old 97's | - |
| M A R C H | 20 | Thugs Are Us | Trick Daddy | - |
| M A R C H | 20 | Thug by Nature | L-Burna | - |
| M A R C H | 20 | Unleashed Memories | Lacuna Coil | - |
| M A R C H | 23 | Itse | Ajattara | - |
| M A R C H | 26 | Angel of Mine | Frank Duval | Compilation |
| M A R C H | 26 | Gorillaz | Gorillaz | Debut |
| M A R C H | 26 | Natural History | I Am Kloot | Debut |
| M A R C H | 26 | Archive | The Specials | Compilation |
| M A R C H | 27 | Acoustic Soul | India.Arie | - |
| M A R C H | 27 | Another Perfect World | Peter Cetera | - |
| M A R C H | 27 | Drops of Jupiter | Train | - |
| M A R C H | 27 | Endangered Species | Big Pun | Compilation |
| M A R C H | 27 | Every Six Seconds | Saliva | - |
| M A R C H | 27 | How I Loved You | Angels of Light | - |
| M A R C H | 27 | Kiss tha Game Goodbye | Jadakiss | - |
| M A R C H | 27 | Live from Mars | Ben Harper | 2xCD; Live |
| M A R C H | 27 | Live in New York City | Bruce Springsteen | Live |
| M A R C H | 27 | The Moon is Down | Further Seems Forever | - |
| M A R C H | 27 | Musicforthemorningafter | Pete Yorn | - |
| M A R C H | 27 | Roll On | The Living End | - |
| M A R C H | 27 | The Sneak Attack | KRS-One | - |
| M A R C H | 27 | Start Breaking My Heart | Manitoba | Debut |
| M A R C H | 27 | Time Bomb | Buckcherry | - |
| M A R C H | 27 | Until the End of Time | 2Pac | - |
| M A R C H | 27 | Whole New You | Shawn Colvin | - |
| M A R C H | 28 | A Best | Ayumi Hamasaki | Compilation |
| M A R C H | 28 | Distance | Hikaru Utada | - |
| M A R C H | ? | Echo Echo | Carbon Leaf | - |
| M A R C H | ? | Beto Vázquez Infinity | Beto Vázquez Infinity | - |

=== April–June ===
| Date | | Album | Artist | Notes |
|---|---|---|---|---|
| A P R I L | 2 | 45 rpm: The Singles, 1977–1979 | The Jam | Box Set |
| A P R I L | 2 | Clarence Park | Chris Clark | - |
| A P R I L | 2 | For the Birds | The Frames | - |
| A P R I L | 2 | Mutter | Rammstein | - |
| A P R I L | 2 | No More Shall We Part | Nick Cave and the Bad Seeds | - |
| A P R I L | 3 | Arrival | Journey | US |
| A P R I L | 3 | Blood Sweat and Years | JT Money | - |
| A P R I L | 3 | B.R.M.C. | Black Rebel Motorcycle Club | Debut |
| A P R I L | 3 | Crown Royal | Run-D.M.C. | - |
| A P R I L | 3 | From Here to Infirmary | Alkaline Trio | - |
| A P R I L | 3 | I Don't Care That You Don't Mind | Crash Test Dummies | - |
| A P R I L | 3 | The Life | Ginuwine | - |
| A P R I L | 3 | Poets and Madmen | Savatage | - |
| A P R I L | 3 | Room Service | Roxette | - |
| A P R I L | 3 | The Swimming Hour | Andrew Bird | - |
| A P R I L | 3 | Unholy Terror | W.A.S.P. | - |
| A P R I L | 3 | One for the Kids | Yellowcard | First album with Ryan Key on lead vocals |
| A P R I L | 3 | The Yin and the Yang | Cappadonna | - |
| A P R I L | 6 | At Dawn | My Morning Jacket | - |
| A P R I L | 9 | Jessico | Babasónicos | - |
| A P R I L | 9 | Now That's What I Call Music! 48 (UK series) | Various Artists | Compilation |
| A P R I L | 10 | Covered With Ants | Guttermouth | - |
| A P R I L | 10 | For the Stars | Elvis Costello and Anne Sofie von Otter | - |
| A P R I L | 10 | The Hogyssey | Spacehog | - |
| A P R I L | 10 | Isolation Drills | Guided by Voices | - |
| A P R I L | 10 | Live Frogs Set 1 | Colonel Les Claypool's Fearless Flying Frog Brigade | Live |
| A P R I L | 10 | Old Ramon | Red House Painters | - |
| A P R I L | 10 | Revelling/Reckoning | Ani DiFranco | - |
| A P R I L | 10 | Rock the Plank | Mad Caddies | - |
| A P R I L | 10 | Surfer | NOFX | EP |
| A P R I L | 10 | Full Collapse | Thursday | - |
| A P R I L | 11 | Just Enough Education to Perform | Stereophonics | - |
| A P R I L | 15 | In My Memory | Tiësto | Debut |
| A P R I L | 16 | Colossus of Destiny | Melvins | Live |
| A P R I L | 16 | A Girl Like Me | Emma Bunton | - |
| A P R I L | 17 | 6.0 | Sister Machine Gun | - |
| A P R I L | 17 | Leaves Turn Inside You | Unwound | - |
| A P R I L | 17 | Live Insurrection | Halford | Live |
| A P R I L | 17 | Olivia | Olivia | - |
| A P R I L | 17 | Psychopharmacology | Firewater | - |
| A P R I L | 17 | Songs from the Earth | Son of Sam | - |
| A P R I L | 17 | Steers & Stripes | Brooks & Dunn | - |
| A P R I L | 17 | Super Hits | New Kids on the Block | Compilation |
| A P R I L | 17 | Up Close and Personal | Angie Martinez | - |
| A P R I L | 17 | The Very Best of Elvis Costello | Elvis Costello | Compilation |
| A P R I L | 21 | Abulum | Glen Phillips | - |
| A P R I L | 23 | Simple Things | Zero 7 | UK |
| A P R I L | 23 | Free All Angels | Ash | - |
| A P R I L | 23 | Echo Park | Feeder | - |
| A P R I L | 23 | Coquelicot Asleep in the Poppies: A Variety of Whimsical Verse | of Montreal | - |
| A P R I L | 23 | In America | Kenny G | Compilation |
| A P R I L | 24 | All for You | Janet Jackson | - |
| A P R I L | 24 | Digimortal | Fear Factory | - |
| A P R I L | 24 | Dizzy Spells | The Ex | - |
| A P R I L | 24 | Electric Mile | G. Love & Special Sauce | - |
| A P R I L | 24 | Going Somewhere | Colin Hay | - |
| A P R I L | 24 | Idiology | Mouse on Mars | - |
| A P R I L | 24 | Man in the Moon | L.A. Guns | - |
| A P R I L | 24 | Mutiny on the Bay | Dead Kennedys | Live |
| A P R I L | 24 | Sad Sappy Sucker | Modest Mouse | - |
| A P R I L | 24 | Set This Circus Down | Tim McGraw | - |
| A P R I L | 24 | Streethawk: A Seduction | Destroyer | - |
| A P R I L | 24 | This Is Where I Came In | Bee Gees | - |
| A P R I L | 24 | Underground Network | Anti-Flag | - |
| A P R I L | 24 | The Unraveling | Rise Against | - |
| A P R I L | 24 | Wide Awake Bored | Treble Charger | - |
| A P R I L | 25 | Wages of Sin | Arch Enemy | - |
| A P R I L | 30 | 45 rpm: The Singles, 1980–1982 | The Jam | Box Set |
| A P R I L | 30 | Confield | Autechre | - |
| A P R I L | 30 | Rock Action | Mogwai | - |
| A P R I L | ? | Brilliant Career | Film School | - |
| M A Y | 1 | The Best Part | J-Live | Debut |
| M A Y | 1 | Carrying On | Montgomery Gentry | - |
| M A Y | 1 | Dillinger & Young Gotti | Tha Dogg Pound | - |
| M A Y | 1 | Mechanical Wonder | Ocean Colour Scene | - |
| M A Y | 1 | PeteStrumentals | Pete Rock | - |
| M A Y | 1 | Popstars | Eden's Crush | - |
| M A Y | 1 | Survivor | Destiny's Child | - |
| M A Y | 1 | Trouble in Shangri-La | Stevie Nicks | - |
| M A Y | 1 | Ultimate Collection | Buju Banton | Compilation |
| M A Y | 3 | Complete 'B' Sides | Pixies | Compilation |
| M A Y | 7 | Asleep In The Back | Elbow | - |
| M A Y | 7 | Truth Be Told | Shed Seven | - |
| M A Y | 7 | Wingspan: Hits and History | Paul McCartney | Compilation |
| M A Y | 8 | All Killer No Filler | Sum 41 | - |
| M A Y | 8 | Amethyst Rock Star | Saul Williams | Debut |
| M A Y | 8 | Awakening the World | Lost Horizon | - |
| M A Y | 8 | Ayeshteni | Natacha Atlas | - |
| M A Y | 8 | Best of B-Boy Records | Boogie Down Productions | Compilation |
| M A Y | 8 | Break the Cycle | Staind | - |
| M A Y | 8 | Bridge | Blues Traveler | - |
| M A Y | 8 | The Crusher | Amon Amarth | - |
| M A Y | 8 | Dare To Dream | Billy Gilman | - |
| M A Y | 8 | Deltron 3030: The Instrumentals | Deltron 3030 | - |
| M A Y | 8 | Dharma Days | Mark Turner | - |
| M A Y | 8 | Falconer | Falconer | - |
| M A Y | 8 | Field Songs | Mark Lanegan | - |
| M A Y | 8 | Flow | Foetus | - |
| M A Y | 8 | Hi-Teknology | Hi-Tek | - |
| M A Y | 8 | Last Fair Deal Gone Down | Katatonia | - |
| M A Y | 8 | Lions | The Black Crowes | - |
| M A Y | 8 | Live on the Black Hand Side | Danzig | Live |
| M A Y | 8 | Look into the Eyeball | David Byrne | - |
| M A Y | 8 | Moulin Rouge! Music from Baz Luhrmann's Film | Various Artists | Soundtrack |
| M A Y | 8 | Voodoo Child: The Jimi Hendrix Collection | Jimi Hendrix | Compilation |
| M A Y | 8 | XX | Mushroomhead | - |
| M A Y | 9 | Sexual Healing | E-Rotic | - |
| M A Y | 13 | Próxima Estación: Esperanza | Manu Chao | - |
| M A Y | 14 | Acoustica | Scorpions | Live |
| M A Y | 14 | Exciter | Depeche Mode | - |
| M A Y | 14 | Reveal | R.E.M. | - |
| M A Y | 14 | Subject to Change | Vanessa-Mae | - |
| M A Y | 14 | To Be Frank | Nik Kershaw | - |
| M A Y | 15 | Anoraknophobia | Marillion | - |
| M A Y | 15 | An Ordinary Day in an Unusual Place | Us3 | - |
| M A Y | 15 | Beautiful | Fantastic Plastic Machine | - |
| M A Y | 15 | Brand New History | Econoline Crush | - |
| M A Y | 15 | The Cold Vein | Cannibal Ox | Debut |
| M A Y | 15 | God Bless The Go-Go's | The Go-Go's | - |
| M A Y | 15 | Lateralus | Tool | - |
| M A Y | 15 | Meet Joe Mac | Joey McIntyre | - |
| M A Y | 15 | Miss E... So Addictive | Missy "Misdemeanor" Elliott | - |
| M A Y | 15 | Open | Cowboy Junkies | - |
| M A Y | 15 | Seventh Key | Seventh Key | - |
| M A Y | 15 | Shoulda Been Home | Robert Cray | - |
| M A Y | 15 | Sweet Tea | Buddy Guy | - |
| M A Y | 15 | A Tribute to Jim Reeves | Charley Pride | Jim Reeves tribute |
| M A Y | 15 | Weezer | Weezer | "The Green Album" |
| M A Y | 15 | The World Needs a Hero | Megadeth | - |
| M A Y | 17 | Same Girl, New Songs | The All-American Rejects | EP |
| M A Y | 21 | 200 Po Vstrechnoy | t.A.T.u. | - |
| M A Y | 21 | 4Lyn | 4Lyn | - |
| M A Y | 21 | Can Our Love... | Tindersticks | - |
| M A Y | 21 | Genetic World | Télépopmusik | - |
| M A Y | 21 | The Merry Sisters of Fate | Lunasa | - |
| M A Y | 21 | Scream if You Wanna Go Faster | Geri Halliwell | - |
| M A Y | 21 | Ultraglide in Black | The Dirtbombs | - |
| M A Y | 21 | Vibrate You | King Adora | Debut |
| M A Y | 22 | All This and Puppet Stew | The Dickies | - |
| M A Y | 22 | Blacktrash: The Autobiography of Kirk Jones | Sticky Fingaz | - |
| M A Y | 22 | Bliss, Please | Blackmail | - |
| M A Y | 22 | Flowers | Echo & the Bunnymen | - |
| M A Y | 22 | Everybody Got Their Something | Nikka Costa | - |
| M A Y | 22 | Hawthorne, CA | The Beach Boys | Compilation |
| M A Y | 22 | Here and Now | Ike Turner | – |
| M A Y | 22 | How I Spent My Summer Vacation | The Bouncing Souls | - |
| M A Y | 22 | Lechuza | Fenix*TX | - |
| M A Y | 22 | Lucero | Lucero | - |
| M A Y | 22 | Machine | Static-X | - |
| M A Y | 22 | Malpractice | Redman | - |
| M A Y | 22 | Mediocre Generica | Leftöver Crack | - |
| M A Y | 22 | My God | Flotsam and Jetsam | – |
| M A Y | 22 | One Wild Night Live 1985–2001 | Bon Jovi | Live |
| M A Y | 22 | Oxygen | Avalon | – |
| M A Y | 22 | The Party's Over | Murphy's Law | - |
| M A Y | 22 | Persevere | The Proclaimers | - |
| M A Y | 22 | Pneumonia | Whiskeytown | - |
| M A Y | 22 | Put Yo Hood Up | Lil Jon & the Eastside Boyz | - |
| M A Y | 22 | Quest for Fire: Firestarter, Vol. 1 | Kardinal Offishall | - |
| M A Y | 22 | Rising Again | Donovan | Live |
| M A Y | 22 | The Renaissance EP | MxPx | EP |
| M A Y | 22 | Stabbing Westward | Stabbing Westward | - |
| M A Y | 23 | Lovebeat | Yoshinori Sunahara | - |
| M A Y | 28 | 10 000 Hz Legend | Air | - |
| M A Y | 28 | Pause | Four Tet | UK |
| M A Y | 29 | 10 Years of Abuse (and Still Broke) | Eyehategod | Live |
| M A Y | 29 | Discosis | Bran Van 3000 | - |
| M A Y | 29 | Irresistible | Jessica Simpson | - |
| M A Y | 29 | Part II | Brad Paisley | - |
| M A Y | ? | Living in a Magazine | Zoot Woman | Debut |
| J U N E | 3 | Don't Leave Me in Love | Dierks Bentley | - |
| J U N E | 4 | Amnesiac | Radiohead | - |
| J U N E | 4 | Faerie Stories | Peatbog Faeries | - |
| J U N E | 4 | Angel Delivery Service | Emil Bulls | - |
| J U N E | 5 | Are You Man Enough? | Betty Blowtorch | - |
| J U N E | 5 | Aura | Asia | - |
| J U N E | 5 | Bodily Functions | Herbert | - |
| J U N E | 5 | Curse of the Hidden Mirror | Blue Öyster Cult | - |
| J U N E | 5 | The Economy of Sound | Seven Mary Three | - |
| J U N E | 5 | Essence | Lucinda Williams | - |
| J U N E | 5 | A Flight and a Crash | Hot Water Music | - |
| J U N E | 5 | Free City | St. Lunatics | - |
| J U N E | 5 | Full Bluntal Nugity | Ted Nugent | Live |
| J U N E | 5 | Idle Will Kill | Osker | - |
| J U N E | 5 | Inside Out | Trisha Yearwood | - |
| J U N E | 5 | Loser Anthems | Matthew Good Band | EP |
| J U N E | 5 | The Merry Sisters of Fate | Lunasa | US |
| J U N E | 5 | Piercing the Veil | William Parker and Hamid Drake | - |
| J U N E | 5 | The Pleasure and the Greed | Big Wreck | - |
| J U N E | 5 | Poses | Rufus Wainwright | - |
| J U N E | 5 | Punk-O-Rama Vol. 6 | Various Artists | Compilation |
| J U N E | 5 | Shine Like It Does: The Anthology (1979–1997) | INXS | Compilation |
| J U N E | 5 | Sinner | Drowning Pool | - |
| J U N E | 5 | Somewhere Over The Slaughter House | Buckethead | - |
| J U N E | 5 | Spankmaster | Kool Keith | - |
| J U N E | 5 | Styx World: Live 2001 | Styx | Live |
| J U N E | 5 | Swordfish:The Album | Paul Oakenfold | Soundtrack |
| J U N E | 8 | Myra | Myra | - |
| J U N E | 11 | The Invisible Band | Travis | - |
| J U N E | 11 | It's a Wonderful Life | Sparklehorse | - |
| J U N E | 11 | Organik | Robert Miles | - |
| J U N E | 11 | Vocal Studies + Uprock Narratives | Prefuse 73 | |
| J U N E | 12 | 9 Lives | AZ | - |
| J U N E | 12 | Beneath the Encasing of Ashes | As I Lay Dying | - |
| J U N E | 12 | The Best of Eighteen Visions | Eighteen Visions | Compilation |
| J U N E | 12 | Love Session | Silk | - |
| J U N E | 12 | Perhaps, I Suppose... | Rufio | - |
| J U N E | 12 | The Philadelphia Experiment | The Philadelphia Experiment | - |
| J U N E | 12 | PS You Love Me | Kid 606 | - |
| J U N E | 12 | Rainbow Connection | Willie Nelson | - |
| J U N E | 12 | Recordings | Porcupine Tree | Compilation |
| J U N E | 12 | Sugar Ray | Sugar Ray | - |
| J U N E | 12 | Take Off Your Pants and Jacket | Blink-182 | - |
| J U N E | 12 | Under the Influence | Warrant | Covers album +2 original tracks |
| J U N E | 12 | Zoom | Electric Light Orchestra | - |
| J U N E | 13 | Document 8 | Pg. 99 | - |
| J U N E | 18 | Beat 'Em Up | Iggy Pop | - |
| J U N E | 18 | Fan Dance | Sam Phillips | - |
| J U N E | 18 | Origin of Symmetry | Muse | UK |
| J U N E | 18 | Outrospective | Faithless | - |
| J U N E | 19 | !!! | !!! | - |
| J U N E | 19 | 2001 Warped Tour Compilation | Various Artists | Compilation |
| J U N E | 19 | Alive in an Ultra World | Steve Vai | Live |
| J U N E | 19 | Cuts for Luck and Scars for Freedom | Mystic | - |
| J U N E | 19 | Devil's Night | D12 | - |
| J U N E | 19 | Don't Tell the Band | Widespread Panic | - |
| J U N E | 19 | Far from Over | Edwin McCain | - |
| J U N E | 19 | From Chaos | 311 | - |
| J U N E | 19 | GQ on the EQ++ | Kid 606 | - |
| J U N E | 19 | Greatest Fits | Ministry | Compilation |
| J U N E | 19 | I'm Already There | Lonestar | - |
| J U N E | 19 | Just Like Gravity | CPR | - |
| J U N E | 19 | Land of the Free? | Pennywise | - |
| J U N E | 19 | Live in San Francisco | Joe Satriani | Live |
| J U N E | 19 | Live, Loud and Loose | Loverboy | Live |
| J U N E | 19 | Luther Vandross | Luther Vandross | - |
| J U N E | 19 | Mandy Moore | Mandy Moore | - |
| J U N E | 19 | No Nose Job: The Legend of Digital Underground | Digital Underground | Compilation |
| J U N E | 19 | Oh, Inverted World | The Shins | - |
| J U N E | 19 | Return of Dragon | Sisqo | - |
| J U N E | 19 | Shangri-La Dee Da | Stone Temple Pilots | - |
| J U N E | 19 | This Ain't a Game | Ray J | - |
| J U N E | 19 | Tongues | Esham | LP |
| J U N E | 19 | Trust No One | Dave Navarro | - |
| J U N E | 19 | The Tyranny of Distance | Ted Leo and the Pharmacists | - |
| J U N E | 19 | The World Won't End | Pernice Brothers | - |
| J U N E | 20 | Beyond Good and Evil | The Cult | - |
| J U N E | 20 | Friends & Family, Vol. 2 | Suicidal Tendencies, Various Artists | Compilation |
| J U N E | 20 | Worldchanger | Jorn | - |
| J U N E | 21 | Mercuric | Element Eighty | - |
| J U N E | 22 | Dil Chahta Hai | Shankar–Ehsaan–Loy | - |
| J U N E | 25 | Go Plastic | Squarepusher | - |
| J U N E | 25 | Here Be Monsters | Ed Harcourt | Debut |
| J U N E | 25 | Ridgeriders | Phil Beer, Ashley Hutchings and Chris While | - |
| J U N E | 26 | Based on a True Story | Lil' Mo | - |
| J U N E | 26 | Episode II | Safri Duo | - |
| J U N E | 26 | Horror Show | Iced Earth | - |
| J U N E | 26 | Jagged Little Thrill | Jagged Edge | - |
| J U N E | 26 | Life Is Good | LFO | - |
| J U N E | 26 | Madhouse: The Very Best of Anthrax | Anthrax | Compilation |
| J U N E | 26 | The Reason | Beanie Sigel | - |
| J U N E | 26 | Rooty | Basement Jaxx | - |
| J U N E | 26 | Songs in A Minor | Alicia Keys | Debut |
| J U N E | 26 | The Texas-Jerusalem Crossroads | Lift to Experience | Debut |
| J U N E | 26 | Blowback | Tricky | - |
| J U N E | ? | Jennie Bomb | Sahara Hotnights | - |

=== July–September ===
| Date | | Album | Artist | Notes |
|---|---|---|---|---|
| J U L Y | 1 | Tales of the Inexpressible | Shpongle | - |
| J U L Y | 1 | Why Call It Anything | The Chameleons | - |
| J U L Y | 2 | Kerrang! | Various artists | Compilation |
| J U L Y | 2 | Rock and Roll: an Introduction to The Velvet Underground | The Velvet Underground | Compilation |
| J U L Y | 2 | Pleased to Meet You | James | - |
| J U L Y | 3 | Brothers and Sisters, Are You Ready? | Big Sugar | - |
| J U L Y | 3 | Endless Summer | Fennesz | - |
| J U L Y | 3 | Lil' Romeo | Lil' Romeo | Debut |
| J U L Y | 3 | Live at L'Olympia | Jeff Buckley | Live |
| J U L Y | 3 | Tales from the B-Side | Biohazard | Compilation |
| J U L Y | 3 | White Blood Cells | The White Stripes | - |
| J U L Y | 3 | X.O. Experience | Tha Liks | - |
| J U L Y | 9 | Karma | Kamelot | - |
| J U L Y | 9 | Ensiferum | Ensiferum | Debut |
| J U L Y | 9 | 4.35am | Gemma Hayes | EP |
| J U L Y | 9 | 11:11 | Regina Spektor | Debut |
| J U L Y | 9 | Yeah Yeah Yeahs | Yeah Yeah Yeahs | EP |
| J U L Y | 10 | Anakonda | Akinyele | - |
| J U L Y | 10 | The Director's Cut | Fantômas | Covers album |
| J U L Y | 10 | Ancient Melodies of the Future | Built to Spill | - |
| J U L Y | 10 | Blood Red Cherry | Jann Arden | - |
| J U L Y | 10 | Camino Palmero | The Calling | Debut |
| J U L Y | 10 | Dream Street | Dream Street | Debut |
| J U L Y | 10 | Fires at Midnight | Blackmore's Night | - |
| J U L Y | 10 | King of da Ghetto | Z-Ro | - |
| J U L Y | 10 | Long Distance | Ivy | US; released in Japan in Nov. 2000 |
| J U L Y | 10 | The Metal Opera | Avantasia | Debut |
| J U L Y | 10 | Priesthood | Killah Priest | - |
| J U L Y | 10 | The Saga Continues... | P. Diddy & the Bad Boy Family | - |
| J U L Y | 10 | Skin | Melissa Etheridge | - |
| J U L Y | 10 | Space Boogie: Smoke Oddessey | Kurupt | - |
| J U L Y | 10 | Standfast | Standfast | Sweden; Debut |
| J U L Y | 10 | Stay What You Are | Saves The Day | - |
| J U L Y | 10 | Symptoms of a Leveling Spirit | Good Riddance | - |
| J U L Y | 14 | Three Chord Opera | Neil Diamond | |
| J U L Y | 16 | Hot Shots II | The Beta Band | UK |
| J U L Y | 16 | Song Yet to Be Sung | Perry Farrell | Debut |
| J U L Y | 16 | This Is Rock'n'Roll | The Quireboys | - |
| J U L Y | 17 | Aaliyah | Aaliyah | - |
| J U L Y | 17 | Broken Silence | Foxy Brown | - |
| J U L Y | 17 | Buffalo Springfield | Buffalo Springfield | Box Set |
| J U L Y | 17 | 1st Born Second | Bilal | Debut |
| J U L Y | 17 | Progress | Rx Bandits | - |
| J U L Y | 17 | Tales from the Lotus Pod | Dark Lotus | LP |
| J U L Y | 17 | What I Learned About Ego, Opinion, Art & Commerce | Goo Goo Dolls | Compilation |
| J U L Y | 21 | Ryden Dirtay | Psychopathic Rydas | LP |
| J U L Y | 23 | Rings Around the World | Super Furry Animals | - |
| J U L Y | 24 | Bleed American | Jimmy Eat World | retitled Jimmy Eat World after 9/11 |
| J U L Y | 24 | The Butterfly Collection | The Nerve Agents | - |
| J U L Y | 24 | Celebrity | NSYNC | - |
| J U L Y | 24 | Choreographed Man of War | Robert Pollard and the Soft Rock Renegades | - |
| J U L Y | 24 | Comfort Eagle | Cake | - |
| J U L Y | 24 | Contact! | Eiffel 65 | - |
| J U L Y | 24 | Global a Go-Go | Joe Strummer & The Mescaleros | - |
| J U L Y | 24 | Greatest Hits | Alice in Chains | Compilation |
| J U L Y | 24 | Live Frogs Set 2 | Les Claypool's Frog Brigade | Live |
| J U L Y | 24 | Love Is a Battlefield | Hi-Standard | EP |
| J U L Y | 24 | Plan B | Huey Lewis and the News | - |
| J U L Y | 24 | Prowler in the Yard | Pig Destroyer | - |
| J U L Y | 24 | The Realness | Cormega | - |
| J U L Y | 24 | Shakedown! | theSTART | Debut |
| J U L Y | 24 | Sharin' in the Groove | Various Artists | Phish Tribute Album |
| J U L Y | 24 | Sounding the Seventh Trumpet | Avenged Sevenfold | - |
| J U L Y | 24 | Tiger Army II: Power of Moonlite | Tiger Army | - |
| J U L Y | 25 | Jessico | Babasonicos | - |
| J U L Y | 30 | Beetroot | Cast | - |
| J U L Y | 30 | Captain Easychord | Stereolab | EP |
| J U L Y | 30 | First Contact | Roger Sanchez | - |
| J U L Y | 30 | Is This It | The Strokes | - |
| J U L Y | 31 | 2002 | Tha Dogg Pound | Compilation |
| J U L Y | 31 | Blake Shelton | Blake Shelton | - |
| J U L Y | 31 | Both Worlds *69 | Gangsta Boo | - |
| J U L Y | 31 | Brace 4 Impak | Da Beatminerz | Debut |
| J U L Y | 31 | Demolition | Judas Priest | - |
| J U L Y | 31 | Duces 'N Trayz: The Old Fashioned Way | Tha Eastsidaz | - |
| J U L Y | 31 | Girl | Eskimo Joe | - |
| J U L Y | 31 | Losing All Hope Is Freedom | Evergreen Terrace | - |
| J U L Y | 31 | Megaton Shotblast | De Facto | EP |
| J U L Y | 31 | Now That's What I Call Music! 7 (U.S. series) | Various Artists | Compilation |
| J U L Y | 31 | So Blu | Blu Cantrell | - |
| J U L Y | 31 | Take Offs and Landings | Rilo Kiley | Debut |
| J U L Y | 31 | Time (The Revelator) | Gillian Welch | - |
| J U L Y | 31 | Tweekend | The Crystal Method | - |
| J U L Y | ? | Danse Manatee | Animal Collective | - |
| A U G U S T | 6 | Crow Sit on Blood Tree | Graham Coxon | - |
| A U G U S T | 6 | In Search Of... | N.E.R.D. | Europe release |
| A U G U S T | 6 | Secrets | The Human League | - |
| A U G U S T | 6 | The Tokyo Showdown Live In Japan 2000 | In Flames | Live |
| A U G U S T | 6 | Night on Earth | Rialto | - |
| A U G U S T | 7 | 8701 | Usher | - |
| A U G U S T | 7 | Closer | Better Than Ezra | - |
| A U G U S T | 7 | Eternal | The Isley Brothers feat. Ronald Isley, aka Mr. Biggs | - |
| A U G U S T | 7 | Funk All Y'all | Detroit Grand Pubahs | - |
| A U G U S T | 7 | Get Down or Lay Down | Philly's Most Wanted | - |
| A U G U S T | 7 | GodMusic | Chocolate Genius | - |
| A U G U S T | 7 | Gravitational Forces | Robert Earl Keen | - |
| A U G U S T | 7 | Kiss tha Game Goodbye | Jadakiss | - |
| A U G U S T | 7 | Mechanized Warfare | Jag Panzer | - |
| A U G U S T | 7 | Oh Aaron | Aaron Carter | - |
| A U G U S T | 7 | True Carnage | Six Feet Under | - |
| A U G U S T | 8 | Actual Size | Mr. Big | - |
| A U G U S T | 8 | Warmness on the Soul | Avenged Sevenfold | EP |
| A U G U S T | 9 | Cockroach | Danger Danger | - |
| A U G U S T | 13 | How It Works | Bodyjar | - |
| A U G U S T | 13 | Run Come Save Me | Roots Manuva | - |
| A U G U S T | 14 | Change Is a Sound | Strike Anywhere | - |
| A U G U S T | 14 | Exit 263 | Chamberlain | - |
| A U G U S T | 14 | Jump5 | Jump5 | - |
| A U G U S T | 14 | Lifer | Lifer | Debut |
| A U G U S T | 14 | Live by Request | k.d. lang | Live |
| A U G U S T | 14 | New Favorite | Alison Krauss | - |
| A U G U S T | 14 | No Self Control | The Planet Smashers | - |
| A U G U S T | 14 | Now | Maxwell | - |
| A U G U S T | 14 | Ozzfest 2001: The Second Millennium | Various Artists | Live |
| A U G U S T | 14 | The Spirit Room | Michelle Branch | - |
| A U G U S T | 14 | Supernova | Lisa Lopes | Debut |
| A U G U S T | 14 | Too Bad You're Beautiful | From Autumn to Ashes | - |
| A U G U S T | 16 | Beautiful Creatures | Beautiful Creatures | - |
| A U G U S T | 20 | Getaway | The Clean | - |
| A U G U S T | 20 | Intensify | Way Out West | - |
| A U G U S T | 21 | 10 Years of Chaos and Confusion | Hypocrisy | - |
| A U G U S T | 21 | Adema | Adema | - |
| A U G U S T | 21 | The Best of the Early Years: 1990–1995 | Buju Banton | Compilation |
| A U G U S T | 21 | Choices: The Album | Three 6 Mafia | - |
| A U G U S T | 21 | Compression | Billy Sheehan | - |
| A U G U S T | 21 | Danse Macabre | The Faint | - |
| A U G U S T | 21 | Deepcut to Nowhere | Graham Parker | - |
| A U G U S T | 21 | Die Hards | The Casualties | - |
| A U G U S T | 21 | Just Be Free | Christina Aguilera | Recorded 1994–'95 |
| A U G U S T | 21 | Live Plus One | All/Descendents | Live |
| A U G U S T | 21 | Mother Earth | Within Temptation | - |
| A U G U S T | 21 | Nice | Rollins Band | - |
| A U G U S T | 21 | Project English | Juvenile | - |
| A U G U S T | 21 | Rock and Roll Part Three | Ozma | - |
| A U G U S T | 21 | Start Static | Sugarcult | - |
| A U G U S T | 21 | The Sword of God | Quasi | - |
| A U G U S T | 21 | Viewfinder | Pullman | - |
| A U G U S T | 21 | The War of Art | American Head Charge | - |
| A U G U S T | 27 | All Is Dream | Mercury Rev | - |
| A U G U S T | 27 | Deep Shadows and Brilliant Highlights | HIM | - |
| A U G U S T | 27 | Get Ready | New Order | - |
| A U G U S T | 27 | Grave Disorder | The Damned | - |
| A U G U S T | 27 | Read My Lips | Sophie Ellis-Bextor | Debut |
| A U G U S T | 27 | Those Who Tell the Truth Shall Die, Those Who Tell the Truth Shall Live Forever | Explosions in the Sky | - |
| A U G U S T | 27 | Trouble – Norwegian Live EP | Coldplay | Live EP |
| A U G U S T | 27 | Vespertine | Björk | - |
| A U G U S T | 28 | Alien Youth | Skillet | - |
| A U G U S T | 28 | The Anatomy of the Tongue in Cheek | Relient K | - |
| A U G U S T | 28 | Anghellic | Tech N9ne | - |
| A U G U S T | 28 | Anyone for Doomsday? | Powerman 5000 | - |
| A U G U S T | 28 | Circulatory System | Circulatory System | - |
| A U G U S T | 28 | Come Clean | Puddle of Mudd | - |
| A U G U S T | 28 | The Creepy EP | Relient K | EP |
| A U G U S T | 28 | Digital Bullet | RZA | - |
| A U G U S T | 28 | Flirting with Twilight | Kurt Elling | - |
| A U G U S T | 28 | Gangland | Kool & the Gang | - |
| A U G U S T | 28 | Iowa | Slipknot | - |
| A U G U S T | 28 | It's a Wonderful Life | Sparklehorse | - |
| A U G U S T | 28 | No More Drama | Mary J. Blige | - |
| A U G U S T | 28 | Pull My Chain | Toby Keith | - |
| A U G U S T | 28 | Sound-Dust | Stereolab | - |
| A U G U S T | 28 | Superhero | Brian McKnight | - |
| A U G U S T | 28 | Thug On Da Line | Krayzie Bone | - |
| A U G U S T | 28 | Weird Revolution | Butthole Surfers | - |
| A U G U S T | 30 | Live at Java Joe's | Jason Mraz | - |
| A U G U S T | 31 | Bath | maudlin of the Well | - |
| A U G U S T | 31 | Leaving Your Body Map | maudlin of the Well | - |
| S E P T E M B E R | 1 | All The Footprints You've Ever Left And The Fear Expecting Ahead | Envy | Japan |
| S E P T E M B E R | 1 | The Herd | The Herd | Debut |
| S E P T E M B E R | 3 | Cold Frontier | Show of Hands | - |
| S E P T E M B E R | 3 | A Funk Odyssey | Jamiroquai | - |
| S E P T E M B E R | 3 | If You've Never Been | Embrace | - |
| S E P T E M B E R | 3 | The Last Time I Did Acid I Went Insane | Jeffrey Lewis | Debut |
| S E P T E M B E R | 3 | Morning Star | Entombed | - |
| S E P T E M B E R | 3 | Mutilated Genitals | Dog Fashion Disco | EP |
| S E P T E M B E R | 3 | Silence Teaches You How to Sing | Ulver | EP |
| S E P T E M B E R | 4 | A-Town Blues | Wayne Hancock | - |
| S E P T E M B E R | 4 | Almost Heathen | Karma to Burn | - |
| S E P T E M B E R | 4 | Back to the Mansion | April Wine | - |
| S E P T E M B E R | 4 | Jane Doe | Converge | - |
| S E P T E M B E R | 4 | Know by Heart | The American Analog Set | - |
| S E P T E M B E R | 4 | Silence | Sonata Arctica | - |
| S E P T E M B E R | 4 | The Tokyo Showdown | In Flames | Live |
| S E P T E M B E R | 4 | Toxicity | System of a Down | - |
| S E P T E M B E R | 4 | United by Fate | Rival Schools | - |
| S E P T E M B E R | 10 | Goodbye Country (Hello Nightclub) | Groove Armada | - |
| S E P T E M B E R | 10 | Magnification | Yes | UK |
| S E P T E M B E R | 10 | Plaguewielder | Darkthrone | - |
| S E P T E M B E R | 10 | Wonderland | The Charlatans | - |
| S E P T E M B E R | 11 | 5:30 Saturday Morning | Lennon | - |
| S E P T E M B E R | 11 | And the Word Became Flesh | Professor Griff | - |
| S E P T E M B E R | 11 | Angles Without Edges | Yesterdays New Quintet | Debut |
| S E P T E M B E R | 11 | Bayleaf | Stone Gossard | Debut |
| S E P T E M B E R | 11 | The Blueprint | Jay-Z | - |
| S E P T E M B E R | 11 | The Brotherhood of the Bomb | Techno Animal | - |
| S E P T E M B E R | 11 | The Coast Is Never Clear | Beulah | - |
| S E P T E M B E R | 11 | The Convincer | Nick Lowe | - |
| S E P T E M B E R | 11 | Des Visages des Figures | Noir Désir | - |
| S E P T E M B E R | 11 | Dig | Boz Scaggs | - |
| S E P T E M B E R | 11 | Face 2 Face | Babyface | - |
| S E P T E M B E R | 11 | Face2Face | Babyface | - |
| S E P T E M B E R | 11 | Ghetto Fabolous | Fabolous | - |
| S E P T E M B E R | 11 | Glitter | Mariah Carey | Soundtrack |
| S E P T E M B E R | 11 | The Glow Pt. 2 | The Microphones | - |
| S E P T E M B E R | 11 | The Goat of Mendes | Akercocke | - |
| S E P T E M B E R | 11 | God Hates Us All | Slayer | - |
| S E P T E M B E R | 11 | Halfway Tree | Damian Marley | - |
| S E P T E M B E R | 11 | Hamilton Ironworks | John Hartford | - |
| S E P T E M B E R | 11 | Live in a Dive: No Use for a Name | No Use for a Name | Live |
| S E P T E M B E R | 11 | Live Scenes from New York | Dream Theater | Live |
| S E P T E M B E R | 11 | "Love and Theft" | Bob Dylan | - |
| S E P T E M B E R | 11 | Low Kick and Hard Bop | Solex | - |
| S E P T E M B E R | 11 | Mediocre Generica | Leftöver Crack | - |
| S E P T E M B E R | 11 | Mink Car | They Might Be Giants | - |
| S E P T E M B E R | 11 | The Moldy Peaches | The Moldy Peaches | Debut |
| S E P T E M B E R | 11 | Rockin' the Suburbs | Ben Folds | - |
| S E P T E M B E R | 11 | Satellite | P.O.D. | - |
| S E P T E M B E R | 11 | Scars | Soil | - |
| S E P T E M B E R | 11 | Silver Side Up | Nickelback | - |
| S E P T E M B E R | 11 | The Tiki Bar Is Open | John Hiatt | - |
| S E P T E M B E R | 11 | Toilet Böys | Toilet Böys | - |
| S E P T E M B E R | 11 | Tomcats Screaming Outside | Roland Orzabal | US |
| S E P T E M B E R | 11 | Uncivilization | Biohazard | - |
| S E P T E M B E R | 11 | Wonders of the World | Long Beach Dub Allstars | - |
| S E P T E M B E R | 11 | Worship | Michael W. Smith | Live |
| S E P T E M B E R | 17 | EP+6 | Mogwai | UK; Compilation |
| S E P T E M B E R | 17 | Let It Come Down | Spiritualized | - |
| S E P T E M B E R | 17 | Strange Little Girls | Tori Amos | - |
| S E P T E M B E R | 18 | The Attraction to All Things Uncertain | Tweaker | - |
| S E P T E M B E R | 18 | Bleed the Sky | Reveille | - |
| S E P T E M B E R | 18 | The Dirty Story: The Best of Ol' Dirty Bastard | Ol' Dirty Bastard | Compilation |
| S E P T E M B E R | 18 | Dragontown | Alice Cooper | - |
| S E P T E M B E R | 18 | Fahrenheit Fair Enough | Telefon Tel Aviv | Debut |
| S E P T E M B E R | 18 | The Golden Hum | Remy Zero | - |
| S E P T E M B E R | 18 | Greatest Hits | Martina McBride | Compilation |
| S E P T E M B E R | 18 | Here's to Shutting Up | Superchunk | - |
| S E P T E M B E R | 18 | The Id | Macy Gray | - |
| S E P T E M B E R | 18 | In Search of Truth | Evergrey | - |
| S E P T E M B E R | 18 | Jhazmyne's Lullaby | 7 Angels 7 Plagues | - |
| S E P T E M B E R | 18 | Labor Days | Aesop Rock | - |
| S E P T E M B E R | 18 | The Look of Love | Diana Krall | - |
| S E P T E M B E R | 18 | Nailed | Place of Skulls | - |
| S E P T E M B E R | 18 | Positively Somewhere | Jennifer Paige | - |
| S E P T E M B E R | 18 | The Power Station Years: The Unreleased Recordings | Jon Bon Jovi | Compilation |
| S E P T E M B E R | 18 | Rain on Lens | Smog | - |
| S E P T E M B E R | 18 | Revolution Revolución | Ill Niño | - |
| S E P T E M B E R | 18 | Revolutionary Vol. 1 | Immortal Technique | - |
| S E P T E M B E R | 18 | Room for Squares | John Mayer | - |
| S E P T E M B E R | 18 | Seven Year Itch: Greatest Hits, 1994–2001 | Collective Soul | Compilation |
| S E P T E M B E R | 18 | Shameless | Therapy? | - |
| S E P T E M B E R | 18 | V | Live | - |
| S E P T E M B E R | 18 | Vertigo | René Marie | - |
| S E P T E M B E R | 19 | Souljacker | Eels | - |
| S E P T E M B E R | 21 | Miranda Lambert | Miranda Lambert | - |
| S E P T E M B E R | 22 | Kristnihald undir Jökli | Quarashi | - |
| S E P T E M B E R | 24 | Building the Machine | Glenn Hughes | - |
| S E P T E M B E R | 24 | Resonance | Anathema | Compilation |
| S E P T E M B E R | 24 | A Story in White | Aereogramme | - |
| S E P T E M B E R | 24 | Souljacker | Eels | UK |
| S E P T E M B E R | 25 | AArt | Acoustic Alchemy | - |
| S E P T E M B E R | 25 | Baldhead Slick & Da Click | Guru | - |
| S E P T E M B E R | 25 | The Best of Bruce Dickinson | Bruce Dickinson | Compilation |
| S E P T E M B E R | 25 | Days of the New (red) | Days of the New | - |
| S E P T E M B E R | 25 | Dead Yuppies | Agnostic Front | - |
| S E P T E M B E R | 25 | Declaration | Steven Curtis Chapman | - |
| S E P T E M B E R | 25 | Everywhere and His Nasty Parlour Tricks | Modest Mouse | EP |
| S E P T E M B E R | 25 | Gold | Ryan Adams | - |
| S E P T E M B E R | 25 | Humanistic | Abandoned Pools | - |
| S E P T E M B E R | 25 | Killing Ground | Saxon | - |
| S E P T E M B E R | 25 | Live Evolution | Queensrÿche | Live |
| S E P T E M B E R | 25 | Love Makes the World | Carole King | - |
| S E P T E M B E R | 25 | Manic Moonlight | King's X | - |
| S E P T E M B E R | 25 | Nivea | Nivea | - |
| S E P T E M B E R | 25 | Songs from Call Me Claus | Garth Brooks | Christmas |
| S E P T E M B E R | 25 | Songs in Red and Gray | Suzanne Vega | - |
| S E P T E M B E R | 25 | Southern Rock Opera | Drive-By Truckers | - |
| S E P T E M B E R | 25 | Steal This Record | The Suicide Machines | - |
| S E P T E M B E R | 25 | Tenacious D | Tenacious D | Debut |
| S E P T E M B E R | 25 | Underneath | The Verve Pipe | - |
| S E P T E M B E R | 25 | Violent Revolution | Kreator | - |
| S E P T E M B E R | 25 | A Wild-Eyed Christmas Night | 38 Special | Christmas |
| S E P T E M B E R | 25 | World of Glass | Tristania | - |
| S E P T E M B E R | 26 | Built from Scratch | The X-Ecutioners | - |
| S E P T E M B E R | 29 | Yankee Hotel Foxtrot | Wilco | - |

=== October–December ===
| Date | | Album | Artist | Notes |
|---|---|---|---|---|
| O C T O B E R | 1 | Amélie | Yann Tiersen | Soundtrack |
| O C T O B E R | 1 | Beautiful Garbage | Garbage | - |
| O C T O B E R | 1 | Fever | Kylie Minogue | - |
| O C T O B E R | 1 | First Born | Eyedea & Abilities | Debut |
| O C T O B E R | 1 | Songs from the West Coast | Elton John | UK |
| O C T O B E R | 1 | Trouble Every Day | Tindersticks | Soundtrack |
| O C T O B E R | 1 | Victoria Beckham | Victoria Beckham | - |
| O C T O B E R | 2 | All Back to the Mine | Moloko | Compilation |
| O C T O B E R | 2 | Alright Guy | Gary Allan | - |
| O C T O B E R | 2 | Burning the Process | Pressure 4-5 | Debut |
| O C T O B E R | 2 | Creedence Clearwater Revival: Box Set | Creedence Clearwater Revival | Box Set |
| O C T O B E R | 2 | The Fallout | Default | - |
| O C T O B E R | 2 | Fantasies & Delusions | Billy Joel | - |
| O C T O B E R | 2 | Go Forth | Les Savy Fav | - |
| O C T O B E R | 2 | The Grand Pecking Order | Oysterhead | Debut |
| O C T O B E R | 2 | Greatest Hits Live: Vancouver 1986 | Donovan | Live |
| O C T O B E R | 2 | Instructions | Jermaine Dupri | - |
| O C T O B E R | 2 | Now It's Overhead | Now It's Overhead | Debut |
| O C T O B E R | 2 | Other Animals | Erase Errata | - |
| O C T O B E R | 2 | Pain Is Love | Ja Rule | - |
| O C T O B E R | 2 | Pass Out of Existence | Chimaira | - |
| O C T O B E R | 2 | Supercharger | Machine Head | - |
| O C T O B E R | 2 | Total Devastation: The Best of | Busta Rhymes | Compilation |
| O C T O B E R | 2 | The Very Best of Winger | Winger | Compilation |
| O C T O B E R | 6 | Nothing New for Trash Like You | Against All Authority | - |
| O C T O B E R | 8 | Born into Trouble as the Sparks Fly Upward | The Silver Mt. Zion Memorial Orchestra & Tra-La-La Band | - |
| O C T O B E R | 8 | Deep in the Hole | Masters of Reality | - |
| O C T O B E R | 8 | The Fake Sound of Progress | Lostprophets | Re-release |
| O C T O B E R | 8 | Love Is Here | Starsailor | - |
| O C T O B E R | 8 | Neon Lights | Simple Minds | - |
| O C T O B E R | 8 | Secret of the Runes | Therion | - |
| O C T O B E R | 9 | 1942 | Soul-Junk | EP |
| O C T O B E R | 9 | Bridge Across Forever | Transatlantic | - |
| O C T O B E R | 9 | Christina Milian | Christina Milian | - |
| O C T O B E R | 9 | Chrome | Trace Adkins | - |
| O C T O B E R | 9 | Dark Days, Bright Nights | Bubba Sparxxx | - |
| O C T O B E R | 9 | D.F.F.D. | The Dictators | - |
| O C T O B E R | 9 | Direct Action: Day 21 | Sham 69 | - |
| O C T O B E R | 9 | Enchantment | Charlotte Church | - |
| O C T O B E R | 9 | Epitaph | Front Line Assembly | - |
| O C T O B E R | 9 | Falling into Place | Finch | EP |
| O C T O B E R | 9 | A Fine Day to Exit | Anathema | - |
| O C T O B E R | 9 | Gerardo: Fame, Sex y Dinero | Gerardo | - |
| O C T O B E R | 9 | Hidden Stash II: The Kream of the Krop | Kottonmouth Kings | - |
| O C T O B E R | 9 | I'm Serious | T.I. | - |
| O C T O B E R | 9 | No World Order | Gamma Ray | - |
| O C T O B E R | 9 | Not All Who Wander Are Lost | Chris Thile | - |
| O C T O B E R | 9 | The Photo Album | Death Cab for Cutie | - |
| O C T O B E R | 9 | Stupid Fat Americans | Zebrahead | - |
| O C T O B E R | 9 | Sweet Home Transylvania | The Bronx Casket Co. | - |
| O C T O B E R | 9 | Ten New Songs | Leonard Cohen | - |
| O C T O B E R | 9 | Together Again For The First Time | Pulley | - |
| O C T O B E R | 9 | Your Favorite Weapon | Brand New | - |
| O C T O B E R | 15 | The DVD | Napalm Death | Live DVD |
| O C T O B E R | 15 | Gold: Greatest Hits | Steps | Compilation |
| O C T O B E R | 15 | Late Night Final | Richard Hawley | - |
| O C T O B E R | 15 | Loss | Mull Historical Society | Debut |
| O C T O B E R | 15 | The Very Best of Bananarama | Bananarama | Compilation |
| O C T O B E R | 16 | 1 Less G n da Hood | Blaze Ya Dead Homie | - |
| O C T O B E R | 16 | The Argument | Fugazi | - |
| O C T O B E R | 16 | Atomic | Lit | - |
| O C T O B E R | 16 | Bootleg Series Volume 1: The Quine Tapes | The Velvet Underground | Live |
| O C T O B E R | 16 | Bravery, Repetition and Noise | The Brian Jonestown Massacre | - |
| O C T O B E R | 16 | Cuttin' Heads | John Mellencamp | - |
| O C T O B E R | 16 | Down to Earth | Ozzy Osbourne | - |
| O C T O B E R | 16 | The Essential Journey | Journey | Compilation |
| O C T O B E R | 16 | Feminist Sweepstakes | Le Tigre | - |
| O C T O B E R | 16 | God Bless America | LeAnn Rimes | Compilation |
| O C T O B E R | 16 | Here to Heaven | Jamie-Lynn Sigler | - |
| O C T O B E R | 16 | The Interzone Mantras | The Tea Party | - |
| O C T O B E R | 16 | Invitation to the Dance | 40 Below Summer | - |
| O C T O B E R | 16 | John P. Kelly | Mr. Cheeks | - |
| O C T O B E R | 16 | Live in L.A. (Death & Raw) | Death | Live |
| O C T O B E R | 16 | Mahogany Soul | Angie Stone | US |
| O C T O B E R | 16 | On the Line | Various Artists | Soundtrack |
| O C T O B E R | 16 | Pretty Together | Sloan | - |
| O C T O B E R | 16 | Temptations | Freestyle Fellowship | - |
| O C T O B E R | 16 | Three Days | Pat Green | - |
| O C T O B E R | 17 | Wanderland | Kelis | - |
| O C T O B E R | 18 | Disposable Arts | Masta Ace | - |
| O C T O B E R | 21 | A Bad Brains Reunion Live from Maritime Hall | Bad Brains | Live |
| O C T O B E R | 21 | Prometheus: The Discipline of Fire & Demise | Emperor | - |
| O C T O B E R | 22 | Cryptic Collection Vol. 2 | Twiztid | LP |
| O C T O B E R | 22 | drukqs | Aphex Twin | - |
| O C T O B E R | 22 | The Grave Digger | Grave Digger | Germany |
| O C T O B E R | 22 | Libertine | Gene | - |
| O C T O B E R | 22 | M-16 | Sodom | - |
| O C T O B E R | 22 | We Love Life | Pulp | - |
| O C T O B E R | 22 | Your New Favourite Band | The Hives | Compilation |
| O C T O B E R | 23 | Audiodog | Bruce Kulick | - |
| O C T O B E R | 23 | Bi-Polar | Vanilla Ice | LP |
| O C T O B E R | 23 | Blue Screen Life | Pinback | - |
| O C T O B E R | 23 | California Crossing | Fu Manchu | - |
| O C T O B E R | 23 | Change | The Dismemberment Plan | - |
| O C T O B E R | 23 | The Complete Limelight Sessions | Shania Twain | Compilation |
| O C T O B E R | 23 | The Egg | Shiner | - |
| O C T O B E R | 23 | Everynight Fire Works | Hey Mercedes | Debut |
| O C T O B E R | 23 | Expansion Team | Dilated Peoples | - |
| O C T O B E R | 23 | Feeding the Wheel | Jordan Rudess | - |
| O C T O B E R | 23 | First Strike Still Deadly | Testament | - |
| O C T O B E R | 23 | Golden State | Bush | - |
| O C T O B E R | 23 | The Great Depression | DMX | - |
| O C T O B E R | 23 | The Greatest Fits | Headstones | Compilation |
| O C T O B E R | 23 | Greatest Hits Volume III: I'm a Survivor | Reba McEntire | Compilation |
| O C T O B E R | 23 | Hymns | Godflesh | - |
| O C T O B E R | 23 | Kingsize | Five | - |
| O C T O B E R | 23 | Live in Chicago 12.19.98 | Dave Matthews Band | Live |
| O C T O B E R | 23 | The Melancholy Collection | Millencolin | US; Compilation |
| O C T O B E R | 23 | Morning View | Incubus | - |
| O C T O B E R | 23 | A New Morning, Changing Weather | The (International) Noise Conspiracy | - |
| O C T O B E R | 23 | Novakane | Outlawz | - |
| O C T O B E R | 23 | Now That's What I Call Christmas! (U.S. series) | Various Artists | Compilation |
| O C T O B E R | 23 | Snowflakes | Toni Braxton | Christmas |
| O C T O B E R | 23 | Understand This | Grand Puba | - |
| O C T O B E R | 23 | Wake Up and Smell the Coffee | The Cranberries | - |
| O C T O B E R | 23 | Won | As Friends Rust | - |
| O C T O B E R | 24 | Point | Cornelius | - |
| O C T O B E R | 26 | 6twenty | The D4 | Debut |
| O C T O B E R | 29 | Into | The Rasmus | - |
| O C T O B E R | 29 | The Tired Sounds of Stars of the Lid | Stars of the Lid | - |
| O C T O B E R | 29 | Turn to Me | Vanessa Amorosi | - |
| O C T O B E R | 30 | 8 Days of Christmas | Destiny's Child | Christmas |
| O C T O B E R | 30 | The Audio of Being | Matthew Good Band | - |
| O C T O B E R | 30 | Cuts from the Crypt | The Misfits | Compilation |
| O C T O B E R | 30 | Escape | Enrique Iglesias | - |
| O C T O B E R | 30 | Greatest Hits, Vol. 2 | Clint Black | Compilation |
| O C T O B E R | 30 | Invincible | Michael Jackson | - |
| O C T O B E R | 30 | Legacy: The Greatest Hits Collection | Boyz II Men | Compilation |
| O C T O B E R | 30 | Lenny | Lenny Kravitz | - |
| O C T O B E R | 30 | Life Is Full of Possibilities | Dntel | - |
| O C T O B E R | 30 | The National | The National | Debut |
| O C T O B E R | 30 | They Threw Us All in a Trench and Stuck a Monument on Top | Liars | Debut |
| O C T O B E R | 30 | Through the Eyes | Flaw | - |
| O C T O B E R | 30 | Tomahawk | Tomahawk | - |
| O C T O B E R | 30 | Versus | Kings of Convenience | Remix |
| O C T O B E R | 30 | White Knuckled Substance | Vendetta Red | - |
| O C T O B E R | 31 | Britney | Britney Spears | Japan |
| O C T O B E R | 31 | Give Blood | Bane | - |
| O C T O B E R | ? | First Album | Miss Kittin & The Hacker | Debut |
| O C T O B E R | ? | Polen | Lynda Thomas | - |
| N O V E M B E R | 2 | Re-Entry | Marley Marl | - |
| N O V E M B E R | 5 | All Hits | All Saints | Compilation |
| N O V E M B E R | 5 | Are You Are Missing Winner | The Fall | - |
| N O V E M B E R | 5 | Best of The Corrs | The Corrs | Compilation |
| N O V E M B E R | 5 | Echoes: The Best of Pink Floyd | Pink Floyd | Compilation |
| N O V E M B E R | 5 | Premium Quality... Serve Loud! | Peter Pan Speedrock | - |
| N O V E M B E R | 5 | White Lilies Island | Natalie Imbruglia | - |
| N O V E M B E R | 6 | Alive 1997 | Daft Punk | Live |
| N O V E M B E R | 6 | Best of SWV | SWV | Compilation |
| N O V E M B E R | 6 | Britney | Britney Spears | US |
| N O V E M B E R | 6 | Diary Of A Sinner: 1st Entry | Petey Pablo | - |
| N O V E M B E R | 6 | Faithfully | Faith Evans | - |
| N O V E M B E R | 6 | Gut the Van | Dispatch | Live |
| N O V E M B E R | 6 | Life | Dope | - |
| N O V E M B E R | 6 | Momentum | tobyMac | - |
| N O V E M B E R | 6 | Music to Make Love to Your Old Lady By | Lovage | - |
| N O V E M B E R | 6 | No Signal | Park | - |
| N O V E M B E R | 6 | Party Music | The Coup | - |
| N O V E M B E R | 6 | Playin' with My Friends: Bennett Sings the Blues | Tony Bennett | - |
| N O V E M B E R | 6 | Relative Ways | ...And You Will Know Us by the Trail of Dead | EP |
| N O V E M B E R | 6 | The Road Less Traveled | George Strait | - |
| N O V E M B E R | 6 | Seul... avec vous | Garou | Live |
| N O V E M B E R | 6 | They Might Be Giants In...Holidayland | They Might Be Giants | Christmas EP |
| N O V E M B E R | 6 | Warts and All: Volume 1 | Moe | Live |
| N O V E M B E R | 9 | Blueprint for a Sunrise | Yoko Ono | - |
| N O V E M B E R | 9 | Level Five | King Crimson | EP |
| N O V E M B E R | 11 | Swing When You're Winning | Robbie Williams | - |
| N O V E M B E R | 11 | They Don't Know | So Solid Crew | Debut |
| N O V E M B E R | 12 | Cold House | Hood | - |
| N O V E M B E R | 12 | Driving Rain | Paul McCartney | - |
| N O V E M B E R | 12 | I Might Be Wrong | Radiohead | Live |
| N O V E M B E R | 12 | Kerrang! 2 The Album | Various artists | Compilation |
| N O V E M B E R | 12 | Oracle | Kittie | - |
| N O V E M B E R | 12 | Play It Like That | Bardot | - |
| N O V E M B E R | 12 | Work to a Calm | Gemma Hayes | EP |
| N O V E M B E R | 12 | World of Our Own | Westlife | Europe |
| N O V E M B E R | 13 | 25 & Alive Boneshaker | Motörhead | DVD |
| N O V E M B E R | 13 | Animosity | Sevendust | - |
| N O V E M B E R | 13 | Bad Dreams | Swollen Members | - |
| N O V E M B E R | 13 | Bulletproof Wallets | Ghostface Killah | - |
| N O V E M B E R | 13 | C! True Hollywood Stories | Canibus | - |
| N O V E M B E R | 13 | Cunt | Blood Duster | - |
| N O V E M B E R | 13 | Destination Unknown | Mest | - |
| N O V E M B E R | 13 | Dirty Money | UGK | - |
| N O V E M B E R | 13 | Disc One: All Their Greatest Hits | Barenaked Ladies | Compilation |
| N O V E M B E R | 13 | The Dreadful Hours | My Dying Bride | - |
| N O V E M B E R | 13 | GHV2 | Madonna | Compilation |
| N O V E M B E R | 13 | Greatest Hits – HIStory Volume I | Michael Jackson | Compilation |
| N O V E M B E R | 13 | Here at the Mayflower | Barry Manilow | - |
| N O V E M B E R | 13 | I Get Wet | Andrew W.K. | - |
| N O V E M B E R | 13 | International Superhits! | Green Day | Compilation |
| N O V E M B E R | 13 | Laundry Service | Shakira | - |
| N O V E M B E R | 13 | Live on the Edge of Forever | Symphony X | Live |
| N O V E M B E R | 13 | Love, Shelby | Shelby Lynne | - |
| N O V E M B E R | 13 | Mis Romances | Luis Miguel | - |
| N O V E M B E R | 13 | Motherland | Natalie Merchant | - |
| N O V E M B E R | 13 | On the Run, Live at the Velvet Lounge | Fred Anderson | Live |
| N O V E M B E R | 13 | Rain of a Thousand Flames | Rhapsody | EP |
| N O V E M B E R | 13 | Rebirth | Angra | - |
| N O V E M B E R | 13 | Scarecrow | Garth Brooks | - |
| N O V E M B E R | 13 | Simple Things | Zero 7 | US |
| N O V E M B E R | 13 | The Sinister Urge | Rob Zombie | - |
| N O V E M B E R | 13 | Sunny Days | Allure | - |
| N O V E M B E R | 13 | This Way | Jewel | - |
| N O V E M B E R | 14 | Far Away Trains Passing By | Ulrich Schnauss | Debut |
| N O V E M B E R | 14 | Rusty Medals and Broken Badges | Over My Dead Body | - |
| N O V E M B E R | 15 | Trading Snakeoil for Wolftickets | Gary Jules | - |
| N O V E M B E R | 16 | Here & Now: The Best of Human Nature | Human Nature | Compilation |
| N O V E M B E R | 16 | Root Fire | Bedouin Soundclash | - |
| N O V E M B E R | 16 | Supergott | Caramell | - |
| N O V E M B E R | 16 | Violence Has Arrived | Gwar | - |
| N O V E M B E R | 16 | Whatever | Green Velvet | - |
| N O V E M B E R | 19 | Insignificance | Jim O'Rourke | - |
| N O V E M B E R | 19 | Légende du Scorpion à Quatre Queues | De Facto | EP |
| N O V E M B E R | 19 | The Mother and the Enemy | Lux Occulta | - |
| N O V E M B E R | 19 | Not for Beginners | Ronnie Wood | - |
| N O V E M B E R | 19 | Span Thang | Basement Jaxx | EP |
| N O V E M B E R | 19 | Whatever Gets You Through The Day | Lighthouse Family | UK |
| N O V E M B E R | 19 | Some Things | Lasgo | Belgium |
| N O V E M B E R | 20 | ...All This Time | Sting | Live |
| N O V E M B E R | 20 | The Beginning of All Things to End | Mudvayne | - |
| N O V E M B E R | 20 | The Box Set | Kiss | Box Set |
| N O V E M B E R | 20 | Bright Flight | Silver Jews | - |
| N O V E M B E R | 20 | Cappadonna Hits | Cappadonna | Compilation |
| N O V E M B E R | 20 | Cocky | Kid Rock | - |
| N O V E M B E R | 20 | Even in Darkness | Dungeon Family | - |
| N O V E M B E R | 20 | Experience: Jill Scott 826+ | Jill Scott | Live |
| N O V E M B E R | 20 | Five Iron Frenzy 2: Electric Boogaloo | Five Iron Frenzy | - |
| N O V E M B E R | 20 | Fractures in the Facade of Your Porcelain Beauty | Atreyu | EP |
| N O V E M B E R | 20 | Goddess in the Doorway | Mick Jagger | - |
| N O V E M B E R | 20 | Haunt Me, Haunt Me Do It Again | Tim Hecker | Debut |
| N O V E M B E R | 20 | Hoobastank | Hoobastank | Debut |
| N O V E M B E R | 20 | Indecent Proposal | Timbaland & Magoo | - |
| N O V E M B E R | 20 | Is This Room Getting Smaller | Onesidezero | Debut |
| N O V E M B E R | 20 | Josh Groban | Josh Groban | Debut |
| N O V E M B E R | 20 | Missundaztood | Pink | - |
| N O V E M B E R | 20 | Now That's What I Call Music! 8 (U.S. series) | Various Artists | Compilation |
| N O V E M B E R | 20 | The Rainbow Children | Prince | - |
| N O V E M B E R | 20 | Revival | Petra | - |
| N O V E M B E R | 20 | Rotten Apples | The Smashing Pumpkins | Compilation |
| N O V E M B E R | 20 | Songs for the Front Row | Ocean Colour Scene | Compilation |
| N O V E M B E R | 20 | Washed Up and Through the Ringer | Catch 22 | - |
| N O V E M B E R | 20 | Weathered | Creed | - |
| N O V E M B E R | 20 | Young Lust: The Aerosmith Anthology | Aerosmith | Compilation |
| N O V E M B E R | 21 | Greatest Hits | The Cure | Compilation |
| N O V E M B E R | 22 | Cover Up | UB40 | - |
| N O V E M B E R | 26 | All Rise | Blue | - |
| N O V E M B E R | 26 | 1 | Fischerspooner | - |
| N O V E M B E R | 26 | 7 Worlds Collide | Neil Finn | Live |
| N O V E M B E R | 26 | Arcana | Edenbridge | - |
| N O V E M B E R | 26 | Heartbreak in Stereo | Pencey Prep | - |
| N O V E M B E R | 26 | "Ridgeriders" In Concert | Phil Beer, Ashley Hutchings and Chris While | Live |
| N O V E M B E R | 26 | Sunshine | S Club 7 | - |
| N O V E M B E R | 27 | Dark Genesis | Iced Earth | Box Set |
| N O V E M B E R | 27 | Eudora | The Get Up Kids | Compilation |
| N O V E M B E R | 27 | Genesis | Busta Rhymes | - |
| N O V E M B E R | 27 | Marc Lavoine | Marc Lavoine | - |
| N O V E M B E R | 27 | Mandrake | Edguy | - |
| N O V E M B E R | 27 | Smash Mouth | Smash Mouth | - |
| N O V E M B E R | 27 | Ultra.Chilled 01 | Various Artists | - |
| N O V E M B E R | 27 | Word of Mouf | Ludacris | - |
| N O V E M B E R | - | Against Me! | Against Me! | EP |
| D E C E M B E R | 1 | Biro Funk | Braintax | Debut |
| D E C E M B E R | 3 | Będę silna | Patrycja Markowska | - |
| D E C E M B E R | 3 | Kollapse | Breach | - |
| D E C E M B E R | 3 | Rescue Me | John Rich | - |
| D E C E M B E R | 4 | AOI: Bionix | De La Soul | - |
| D E C E M B E R | 4 | B-Sides Ultra | James | Compilation |
| D E C E M B E R | 4 | Bang or Ball | Mack 10 | - |
| D E C E M B E R | 4 | Big Boi and Dre Present... Outkast | Outkast | Compilation |
| D E C E M B E R | 4 | Jealous Ones Still Envy (J.O.S.E.) | Fat Joe | - |
| D E C E M B E R | 4 | Music and Me | Nate Dogg | - |
| D E C E M B E R | 4 | New Old Songs | Limp Bizkit | Remix |
| D E C E M B E R | 4 | Silencing the Singing | Ulver | EP |
| D E C E M B E R | 4 | Stiff Upper Lip Live | AC/DC | VHS/DVD |
| D E C E M B E R | 4 | Stoned Raiders | Cypress Hill | - |
| D E C E M B E R | 4 | Tears | The Crüxshadows | EP |
| D E C E M B E R | 4 | Where Sleeplessness Is Rest from Nightmares | Arma Angelus | - |
| D E C E M B E R | 5 | Perception of Reality | Takara | - |
| D E C E M B E R | 7 | The Feature | Needtobreathe | - |
| D E C E M B E R | 7 | Paws | Four Tet | EP |
| D E C E M B E R | 7 | Twilight | Erben der Schöpfung | Debut |
| D E C E M B E R | 9 | Back Porch Spirituals | Jeremy Fisher | - |
| D E C E M B E R | 10 | BlueBOB | David Lynch | Debut |
| D E C E M B E R | 10 | Deep Blue Something | Deep Blue Something | - |
| D E C E M B E R | 10 | Live Rounds in Tokyo | The Haunted | - |
| D E C E M B E R | 11 | Better Days | Joe | - |
| D E C E M B E R | 11 | Cannon to a Whisper | Breaking Pangaea | - |
| D E C E M B E R | 11 | Freak of Nature | Anastacia | - |
| D E C E M B E R | 11 | How High: The Soundtrack | Method Man & Redman | - |
| D E C E M B E R | 11 | Infamy | Mobb Deep | - |
| D E C E M B E R | 11 | Les Indispensables | Celine Dion | Compilation |
| D E C E M B E R | 11 | The Return of the Regulator | Warren G | - |
| D E C E M B E R | 11 | Rock Steady | No Doubt | - |
| D E C E M B E R | 12 | G Sides | Gorillaz | B-Sides |
| D E C E M B E R | 14 | 2 | Florent Pagny | Cover album |
| D E C E M B E R | 18 | Doggy Bag | Bow Wow | - |
| D E C E M B E R | 18 | Dreams Can Come True, Greatest Hits Vol. 1 | Gabrielle | Compilation |
| D E C E M B E R | 18 | Forgotten Freshness Volume 3 | Insane Clown Posse | Compilation |
| D E C E M B E R | 18 | Game Face | Master P | - |
| D E C E M B E R | 18 | Idiot Road | The Arrogant Worms | - |
| D E C E M B E R | 18 | Iron Flag | Wu-Tang Clan | - |
| D E C E M B E R | 18 | Jay-Z: Unplugged | Jay-Z | Live |
| D E C E M B E R | 18 | More Fast and Furious: Music from and Inspired by the Motion Picture The Fast and the Furious | Various Artists | Soundtrack |
| D E C E M B E R | 18 | Stillmatic | Nas | - |
| D E C E M B E R | 21 | A Call to Arms | Bandits of the Acoustic Revolution | EP |
| D E C E M B E R | 21 | Versão Acústica | Emmerson Nogueira | - |
| D E C E M B E R | 23 | ...For the Kids | Gym Class Heroes | - |

=== Release date unknown ===
- 5 Songs – The Decemberists
- Someday... – Cindy Blackman
- Surf's Up! – David Thomas and Two Pale Boys
- Twilight – The Handsome Family

== Top 5 Selling Albums of Billboard Year ==
1. Hybrid Theory – Linkin Park
2. 1 – The Beatles
3. Invincible – Michael Jackson
4. All That You Can't Leave Behind – U2
5. Aaliyah – Aaliyah

== Top 10 Best Selling Albums 2001 (Soundscan) ==
1. Hybrid Theory by Linkin Park ~ 4,810,000
2. Hot Shot by Shaggy ~ 4,520,000
3. Celebrity by NSYNC ~ 4,420,000
4. A Day Without Rain by Enya ~ 4,410,000
5. Break the Cycle by Staind ~ 4,240,000
6. Songs in A Minor by Alicia Keys ~ 4,100,000
7. Survivor by Destiny's Child ~ 3,720,000
8. Weathered by Creed ~ 3,580,000
9. O Brother, Where Art Thou? Soundtrack ~ 3,460,000
10. Now That's What I Call Music! 6 ~ 3,130,000

== Popular songs ==
- "19-2000" – Gorillaz (June 25 [UK]; July 17 [US])
- "A Little Bit" - Jessica Simpson
- "À ma place" – Axel Bauer and Zazie
- "All for You" – Janet Jackson (March 27)
- "All or Nothing" – O-Town (January 23)
- "American Psycho" – Treble Charger
- "Angel" – Shaggy feat. Rayvon
- "Another Chance" – Roger Sanchez
- "Another Day In Paradise" – Brandy feat. Ray J (March)
- "Bad Ambassador" – The Divine Comedy (April 17)
- "Because I Got High" – Afroman
- "Bodies" – Drowning Pool
- "Bootylicious" – Destiny's Child (June 26 [US], July 3 [worldwide])
- "Boys" – Britney Spears
- "Brand New Low" – Treble Charger
- "Buck Rogers" – Feeder (January 8)
- "Butterfly" – Crazy Town
- "Butterfly" – Kylie Minogue (November 12)
- "California" – Wave
- "Candy" – Ash (October 1)
- "Can't Get You Out of My Head" – Kylie Minogue (September 17)
- "Chase the Sun" – Planet Funk
- "Chop Suey!" – System of a Down (August)
- "Clint Eastwood" – Gorillaz (March 5 [UK])
- "Come Along" – Titiyo
- "Control" – Puddle of Mudd
- "Crawling" – Linkin Park (April 17)
- "Crying at the Discoteque" – Alcazar
- "Crystal" – New Order (13 August)
- "Crush" - Mandy Moore
- "Digital Love" – Daft Punk
- "Don't Let Me Be The Last To Know" – Britney Spears
- "Don't Stop Movin'" – S Club 7
- "Don't Tell Me" – Madonna (November 21, 2000 (UK); January 16, 2001 (US))
- "Drops of Jupiter (Tell Me)" – Train (February 20)
- "Drowning" – Backstreet Boys
- "Elevation" – U2
- "Eple" – Röyksopp
- "Eternity/The Road to Mandalay" – Robbie Williams (July 9)
- "Fallin'" – Alicia Keys (July 10)
- "Family Affair" – Mary J. Blige
- "Fat Lip" – Sum 41 (August 28 US; October 1 UK)
- "Fight Music" – D12
- "First Date" – Blink-182 (September 24)
- "Freedom" – Paul McCartney (Written about the September 11th attacks)
- "Follow Me" – Uncle Kracker
- "Get the Party Started" – P!nk (October 9)
- "Get Ur Freak On" – Missy Elliott (February 20)
- "Gone" – NSYNC (October)
- "Handbags and Gladrags" – Stereophonics
- "Hanging By A Moment" – Lifehouse
- "Hard to Explain" – The Strokes (June 25, 2001 (UK), April 30, 2002 (US))
- "Harder, Better, Faster, Stronger" – Daft Punk
- "Have a Nice Day" – Stereophonics
- "Have You Ever" – S Club 7
- "Heaven" – DJ Sammy & Yanou featuring Do
- "Heaven Is a Halfpipe" – OPM
- "Here With Me" – Dido
- "Here's to the Night" – Eve 6
- "Hero" – Enrique Iglesias (November)
- "How We Roll" – Big Pun
- "How Wonderful You Are " – Gordon Haskell
- "How You Remind Me" – Nickelback (December 16)
- "I Believe" – Galleon
- "I Don't Want a Lover (remix)" – Texas
- "I Feel Loved" – Depeche Mode (July 30 UK; July 31 US)
- "I Wanna Be Bad" – Willa Ford (May 22)
- "I'm a Slave 4 U" – Britney Spears (October 23 [US]; October 8 [UK])
- "I'm Like a Bird" – Nelly Furtado
- "I'm Real" – Jennifer Lopez (October 16)
- "I'm Real (Murder Remix)" – Jennifer Lopez and Ja Rule (peaked week of September 11)
- "Imitation of Life" – R.E.M. (April)
- "In My Pocket" - Mandy Moore
- "In the End" – Linkin Park (November 20)
- "In Too Deep" – Sum 41 (December 3, UK)
- "Inner Smile" – Texas
- "Irresistible" – Jessica Simpson (April 12)
- "Island in the Sun" – Weezer (August 28)
- "It Wasn't Me" – Shaggy featuring Rikrok
- "It's a Great Day to Be Alive" – Travis Tritt
- "It's Been Awhile" – Staind (June 26)
- "It's Raining Men" – Geri Halliwell (April 30 [UK])
- "Izzo (H.O.V.A.)" – Jay Z (July 17)
- "Jaded" – Aerosmith (March 13)
- "Just Push Play" – Aerosmith
- "Juxtapozed with U" – Super Furry Animals
- "Knives Out" – Radiohead August 14 (Pt.1, Pt.2); August 28 (US CD); September 25, 2001 (Pt. 3)
- "La Musique (Angelica)" – Star Academy France (December)
- "La Negra Tiene Tumbao" – Celia Cruz (October 2, 2001)
- "Lady Marmalade" – Christina Aguilera, Pink, Lil' Kim & Mýa (May 8)
- "Last Nite" – The Strokes
- "Left Behind" – Slipknot
- "Life" – E-Type featuring Nana Hedin
- "Liquid Dreams" – O-Town
- "Let Me Blow Ya Mind" – Eve featuring Gwen Stefani (May 15)
- "Lo Mejor de Mi" – Lynda Thomas
- "Love Don't Cost A Thing" – Jennifer Lopez (January 30)
- "Loverboy" – Mariah Carey (July 16)
- "Me Gustas Tu" – Manu Chao
- "The Middle" – Jimmy Eat World
- "More Than a Woman" – Aaliyah (November 13, 2001 [US]; February 19, 2002 [UK]; March 5, 2002 [AUS])
- "Mr. Writer" – Stereophonics
- "My Sacrifice" – Creed (December 11)
- "My Way" – Limp Bizkit (May)
- "Never Had a Dream Come True" – S Club 7
- "Nobody Wants to Be Lonely" – Ricky Martin & Christina Aguilera
- "Ocean Spray" – Manic Street Preachers (June 4)
- "One Minute Man" – Missy Elliott (featuring Ludacris and Trina)
- "One More Time" – Daft Punk
- "One Wild Night" - Bon Jovi
- "Only Time" – Enya
- "Out of Reach" – Gabrielle
- "Outside" – Staind (May)
- "Overprotected" – Britney Spears (December)
- "Pagan Poetry" – Björk
- "Play" – Jennifer Lopez
- "Played-A-Live (The Bongo Song)" – Safri Duo
- "Plug in Baby" – Muse
- "Pop" – NSYNC (July 17)
- "Purple Hills" – D12 featuring Eminem
- "Pyramid Song" – Radiohead (May 29, 2001; June 19, 2001 (Pt.1, Pt.2); December 11, 2001 (Japan CD)
- "Queen of My Heart" – Westlife (UK)
- "Ramp! (The Logical Song)" – Scooter
- "Ride Wit Me" – Nelly Featuring City Spud (July 24)
- "The Rock Show" – Blink-182 (July 1)
- "Rock The Boat" – Aaliyah (August 2001 (North America); March 5, 2002 (Australia); May 6, 2002 (UK))
- "Sail Away" – David Gray
- "Salsoul Nugget (If U Wanna)" – M&S Pres. The Girl Next Door (#6 UK)
- "Schism" – Tool
- "Seul" – Garou
- "Sexual Guarantee" – Alcazar (November 26)
- "Shining Light" – Ash (January 29)
- "Short Skirt/Long Jacket" – Cake
- "Side" – Travis (September 17)
- "Sing" – Travis (May 28)
- "Smooth Criminal" – Alien Ant Farm
- "Someone To Call My Lover" – Janet Jackson
- "Something" – Lasgo
- "Stan" – Eminem featuring Dido
- "Standing Still" – Jewel
- "Starlight" – The Supermen Lovers
- "Step On My Old Size Nines" – Stereophonics
- "Stronger" – Britney Spears
- "Stuck in a Moment You Can't Get Out Of" – U2
- "Superman (It's Not Easy)" – Five For Fighting
- "Superstylin'" – Groove Armada
- "Survivor" – Destiny's Child
- "Thank You" – Dido (21 May)
- "There Must Be an Angel" – No Angels
- "This Year's Love" – David Gray
- "Toutes les femmes de ta vie" – L5
- "Turn off the Light" – Nelly Furtado (August 14)
- "Turn the Tide" – Sylver
- "U Got It Bad" – Usher
- "U Remind Me" – Usher
- "Ugly" – Bubba Sparxxx
- "Up On The Downside" – Ocean Colour Scene
- "Upside Down" – A*Teens
- "Uptown Girl" – Westlife (UK)
- "Us Against The World" – Play (September 11)
- "Walk On" – U2 (November 19) (UK/Eur); November 26(Aus)
- "Want You Bad" – The Offspring
- "Wasting My Time" – Default
- "The Way You Like It" – Adema
- "We Come 1" – Faithless
- "We Need a Resolution" – Aaliyah (April 24)
- "Weapon of Choice" – Fatboy Slim
- "What It Feels Like for a Girl" – Madonna
- "Whenever, Wherever" – Shakira
- "Wherever You Will Go" – The Calling (December 16)
- "Who Do You Love Now?" – Riva featuring Dannii Minogue (November 19)
- "Whole Again" – Atomic Kitten
- "Wish You Were Here" – Incubus
- "With Arms Wide Open" – Creed
- "Wrong Impression" – Natalie Imbruglia
- "You Rock My World" – Michael Jackson
- "Youth of the Nation" – P.O.D. (November 27)

== Opera ==
- Jason Kao Hwang – The Floating Box: A Story in Chinatown
- Theo Loevendie – Johnny & Jones
- Sven-David Sandström – Jeppe: The Cruel Comedy
- David Sawer – From Morning to Midnight
- Michel van der Aa – Vuur

== Musical theater ==
- Atgof o'r Sêr – first performed by Bryn Terfel and Cor Rhuthun in north Wales. Commissioned for the National Eisteddfod of Wales at Denbigh.
- A Class Act – Broadway production opened at the Ambassador Theatre on March 11 and ran for 105 performances
- 42nd Street – Broadway revival opened at the Ford Center on May 2
- Mamma Mia! – Broadway production opened at the Winter Garden Theatre on October 18 and ran for 5773 performances. It was the eighth longest run in Broadway musical history.
- The Producers – Broadway production opened at St. James Theatre on April 19 and ran for 2502 performances. The show won a record twelve Tony Awards.
- Urinetown – Broadway production opened at the Hudson Theatre on September 20 and ran for 965 performances

== Musical films ==
- Beijing Rocks
- Carmen: A Hip Hopera
- Gadar: Ek Prem Katha, starring Sunny Deol, Amisha Patel and Amrish Puri
- Glitter released September 21, starring Mariah Carey and Max Beesley
- Hedwig and the Angry Inch, directed by and starring John Cameron Mitchell
- Love You Hamesha, starring Akshaye Khanna and Sonali Bendre
- Moulin Rouge! released May 18, starring Nicole Kidman and Ewan McGregor
- On the Road to Emmaus, starring Peter Franzén
- One Night the Moon, starring Paul Kelly and Kaarin Fairfax
- Rebelové, starring Zuzana Norisová and Tomáš Hanák
- Rock Star
- Scratch

== Musical television ==
- Band Geeks episode of SpongeBob SquarePants

== Births ==
- January 1 – Winter, South Korean singer and dancer (aespa)
- January 2 – Inji, Turkish singer-songwriter
- January 3 – Erick Brian Colón, Dancer, football fan, and the youngest member of the group CNCO
- January 4 – Lola Young, English singer-songwriter and multi-instrumentalist
- January 5 – Victony, Nigerian singer, songwriter and rapper
- January 8
  - Kaash Paige, American singer-songwriter
  - Melitha Sidabutar, Indonesian singer (d. 2024)
- January 18 – Thomas Raggi, Italian guitarist (Måneskin)
- January 21 – Griff, British singer
- January 25 – Michela Pace, Maltese singer
- February 5
  - Maria Makino, Japanese pop singer, dancer and model (Morning Musume)
  - Kim Min-ju, South Korean actress and singer
- February 8
  - Jxdn, American singer-songwriter
  - I.N, South Korean singer
- February 22 – Chase Icon, American singer, songwriter, social media content creator, and reality television personality
- March 3 - Jvke, American singer-songwriter, producer, and social media personality.
- March 8 – Zhavia Ward, American singer, songwriter, musician
- March 9 – Jeon Somi, Canadian singer
- March 18 – Jada Facer, American actress and singer
- March 19 - Eunseok, South Korean singer (Riize)
- March 21 – Addison Grace, American singer-songwriter and online personality
- March 27 – Natanael Cano, Mexican rapper
- March 31
  - Noah Urrea, American singer (Now United)
  - Sofia Tarasova, Ukrainian singer and actress
- April 10
  - Noa Kirel, Israeli singer
  - Angelina Mango, Italian singer
- April 13 − Isaiah Falls, American singer-songwriter and producer
- April 17 – Ryujin, South Korean rapper and dancer (Itzy)
- April 18 – PinkPantheress, English singer and record producer
- April 21 − Thomas LaRosa, American singer, songwriter, producer and brother of Isabel LaRosa
- April 29 – JJ (singer), Austrian singer-songwriter
- April 30 – Lil Tjay, American rapper
- May 9 – Bandokay, British rapper
- May 15 – Kevin Kaarl, Mexican singer and producer
- May 17 – AJ Mitchell, American singer
- May 18 – Breskvica, Serbian singer
- May 27 – Zach Herron, American singer (Why Don't We)
- June 1 – ppcocaine, American rapper
- June 3 - Reyanna Maria, Filipino-Australian singer, rapper, and songwriter
- June 5 – Chaeryeong, South Korean singer and dancer (Itzy)
- June 16 – Shannon K, American-Indian singer and actress
- June 18 - Mike Dimes, American rapper
- June 23 - Bárbara Bandeira, Portuguese singer
- July 1
  - Chosen Jacobs, American actress, musician, singer-songwriter and rapper
  - Dave Blunts, American rapper and singer-songwriter
  - Elmiene, British-Sudanese singer
- July 15 − 6arelyhuman, American singer, rapper and songwriter
- July 30 – Destroy Lonely, American rapper
- August 3 – Tiago PZK, Argentine rapper
- August 7 – Ryusei Ohnishi, Japanese singer and actor (Naniwa Danshi)
- August 12 – Dixie D'Amelio, American singer
- August 18 – Almaxanım, Azerbaijani singer
- August 27 – May-a, Australian singer-songwriter
- August 29 – Rori Moore, American singer (3Quency)
- August 30 - Emily Bear, American singer-songwriter, musician, composer, and pianoist
- September 3 – Kaia Gerber, American model and actress (daughter of Cindy Crawford and Rande Gerber)
- September 6 – Laprete, American singer, producer and musician
- September 8 – Remo Forrer, Swiss singer
- September 11 − Rin, Japanese singer (Atarashii Gakko!)
- September 12 − Chris Grey, Canadian R&B singer
- September 13 - Sungchan, South Korean singer (Riize)
- September 15 – Voyage, Serbian singer
- September 16 – Cris MJ, Chilean singer and songwriter
- September 18 – Darkoo, English-Nigerian rapper
- September 23
  - J.I., American rapper and songwriter
  - Tiara Andini, Indonesian singer
- October 3 – SoFaygo, American rapper
- October 6 – Ari Abdul, American singer-songwriter
- October 8 – Huh Yunjin, South Korean singer (Le Sserafim)
- October 22 – Jo Yuri, South Korean singer
- October 30 – Bella Paige, Australian singer
- November 22 – Chenle, Chinese singer and songwriter (NCT Dream)
- November 28 – Stella Quaresma, English singer, member of Flo
- November 29 − Suzuka, Japanese singer (Atarashii Gakko!)
- December 1 – Elias Abbas, Swedish singer
- December 5 − YG Marley, American singer and rapper (son of Lauryn Hill and Rohan Marley)
- December 6
  - Molly Grace, American musician and singer-songwriter
  - Zack Tabudlo, Filipino singer, songwriter, and musician
- December 15 – Diljá, Icelandic singer
- December 17 – Brakence, American singer
- December 18 – Billie Eilish, American singer, dancer, musician, activist and songwriter
- Unknown – Libianca, Cameroonian and American singer

== Deaths ==
- January 4 – Les Brown, bandleader (89)
- January 5 – Milan Hlavsa, Czech musician (Plastic People of the Universe) (49)
- January 7 – James Carr, soul singer (58)
- January 10 – Bryan Gregory, guitarist (The Cramps) (49)
- January 24 – Leif Thybo, Danish composer and organist (78)
- February 4
  - J.J. Johnson, jazz bebop trombonist (77)
  - Iannis Xenakis, Greek composer (78)
- February 7 – Dale Evans, American singer-songwriter and actress (88)
- February 10 – Buddy Tate, jazz musician (87)
- February 13 – George T. Simon, music critic and original Glenn Miller Orchestra drummer (pneumonia)
- February 19 – Charles Trenet French singer and songwriter (87)
- February 21
  - Ronnie Hilton, English singer (75)
  - Malcolm Yelvington, rockabilly musician (82)
- February 22 – John Fahey, guitarist, indie label owner (61)
- March 4 – Glenn Hughes, The Village People (50)
- March 9 – Richard Stone, American composer (47)
- March 12 – Sir Lancelot, calypso singer (98)
- March 18 – John Phillips, singer-songwriter, co-founder of The Mamas & the Papas (65)
- March 20 – Francis Grasso, disc jockey (51)
- March 28 – Moe Koffman, Canadian jazz singer (73)
- March 29 – John Lewis, jazz pianist (80)
- April 6 – Charles Pettigrew, of Charles & Eddie (37) (cancer)
- April 9 – Graziella Sciutti, operatic soprano (73)
- April 11
  - Sandy Bull, folk musician (60)
  - Graciela Naranjo, bolero singer and actress (84)
  - Sir Harry Secombe, entertainer (79)
- April 15 – Joey Ramone, lead singer of The Ramones (49) (lymphoma)
- April 20 – Giuseppe Sinopoli, composer and conductor (54) (heart attack)
- May 3 – Billy Higgins, jazz drummer (64)
- May 5 – Boozoo Chavis, zydeco musician (70)
- May 10 – James E. Myers, songwriter ("Rock Around the Clock") (81)
- May 12 – Perry Como, American crooner (88)
- May 16 – Prince Ital Joe, reggae singer (38) (car accident)
- May 20 – Renato Carosone, Italian musician and singer (81)
- June 4 – John Hartford, bluegrass musician (64)
- June 7 – Carole Fredericks, singer
- June 13 – Marcelo Fromer, guitarist for Brazilian band Titãs (39) (rammed by a motorcycle)
- June 18 – Davorin Popović, lead singer for Bosnian band Indexi (55)
- June 21 – John Lee Hooker, blues musician (88)
- June 30
  - Chet Atkins, country musician (77)
  - Joe Henderson, jazz saxophonist (64)
- July 3
  - Delia Derbyshire, English electronic composer (64)
  - Johnny Russell, American singer-songwriter and guitarist (61)
- July 5 – Ernie K-Doe, R&B singer (65)
- July 7 – Fred Neil, folk singer-songwriter (65)
- July 15 – Anthony Ian Berkeley, rapper (Brothers Grym, Gravediggaz) (36) (colon cancer)
- July 18 – Mimi Fariña, singer-songwriter (56) (neuroendocrine cancer)
- July 23 – Richie Lee, singer and bassist (Acetone) (34) (suicide)
- July 27
  - Harold Land, hard bop saxophonist (73)
  - Leon Wilkeson, bassist for Lynyrd Skynyrd (49)
- August 2 – Ronald Townson, American singer and actor (The 5th Dimension) (68)
- August 6 – Larry Adler, harmonica virtuoso (86)
- August 18 – Roland Cardon, Belgian composer and multi-instrumentalist (72)
- August 25 – Aaliyah, American singer, model, dancer and actress (22) (plane crash)
- August 27 – Karl Ulrich Schnabel, pianist (92)
- August 29 – Graeme "Shirley" Strachan, lead singer of Skyhooks (49)
- September 1 – Ted Mulry, lead singer with Ted Mulry Gang (54)
- September 6 – Carl Crack, techno musician (Atari Teenage Riot) (30)
- September 22 – Isaac Stern, violinist (81)
- October 3 – Tatiana Menotti, operatic soprano (92)
- October 5 – Ivan Hrušovský, Slovak composer (74)
- October 10 – Barry McCauley, operatic tenor (51) (lung cancer)
- October 17 – Jay Livingston, songwriter (86)
- November 17 – Michael Karoli, guitarist, violinist and composer (53) (cancer)
- November 21 – Ralph Burns, American songwriter, bandleader, composer, conductor, arranger and bebop pianist (79)
- November 24 – Melanie Thornton, singer (La Bouche) (34) (air crash)
- November 28 – Kal Mann, American lyricist ("Teddy Bear", "Butterfly") (84)
- November 29 – George Harrison, musician and former member of The Beatles (58) (lung cancer)
- December 13 – Chuck Schuldiner, vocalist and guitarist with Death (34) (cancer)
- December 15 – Rufus Thomas, singer (84)
- December 16 – Stuart Adamson, guitarist with Big Country (43) (suicide)
- December 17 – Débria Brown, operatic soprano (65)
- December 18 – Gilbert Bécaud, singer-songwriter (74)
- December 22 – Norman Granz, American producer (83)
- December 29 – Cássia Eller, Brazilian singer (39)

== Awards ==
- The following artists are inducted into the Rock and Roll Hall of Fame: Aerosmith, Solomon Burke, The Flamingos, Michael Jackson, Queen, Paul Simon, Steely Dan and Ritchie Valens
- Inductees of the GMA Gospel Music Hall of Fame include Larry Norman, and Elvis Presley

=== ARIA Music Awards ===
- ARIA Music Awards of 2001

=== Country Music Association Awards ===
- 2001 Country Music Association Awards

=== Grammy Awards ===
- Grammy Awards of 2001

=== Juno Awards ===
- Juno Awards of 2001
  - March 4 – Bruce Cockburn is inducted into the Canadian Music Hall of Fame

=== Eurovision Song Contest ===
- Eurovision Song Contest 2001

=== Mercury Music Prize ===
- Stories from the City, Stories from the Sea – PJ Harvey wins.

=== MTV Video Music Awards ===
- 2001 MTV Video Music Awards

== See also ==
- Category:Record labels established in 2001
