= Sintagma =

Costa Rican rock band

- Origin: San José, Costa Rica
- Genres: Heavy metal, hard rock
- Years active: 2000–2009; 2018–present
- Labels: Long Beach Records
- Members: Ricardo Chamberlain; José Soto; Vinicio Barrantes; Jacobo Chaverri; Mauricio Mora
- Past members: Randall Aguilar; Fabián Mata; Leonardo Barboza; Luis Sandino
- Website: https://www.facebook.com/sintagmacr

Sintagma is a Costa Rican rock band founded in the year 2000. They are one of the leading exponents of hard rock in Costa Rica. Nationally, they are known for singles such as "Estelar", "7" and "Visiones", and for their intense live shows at Costa Rica's Rock Fest from 2001. They broke up after recording their second album in 2009 and reunited ten years later.

== History ==
Sintagma was begun by José Soto (drums) and Ricardo Chamberlain (guitar) in July 2000. They had played together before in a band called Irae, which they decided to leave to produce original rock music. They had to find a bass guitarist and a vocalist. Fabián Mata joined the band because he had played with Chamberlain in high school. Chamberlain knew Randall Aguilar from his former work. In late July, they had five new songs. They made their first public performance in November 2000 when they played at Bar Sand, opening a show for Por Partes. The audience asked for an encore, so the band played their entire repertoire again.

The band started to compose new songs and kept playing live. The next show was a benefic event in December, when they shared a stage with San Lucas, La 5ta Esencia and Por Partes. After several concerts, the band finally recorded their first album D100DDAI, produced by Massimo Hernández, the drummer from the band Gandhi, and recorded by Alberto Ortiz. The album was well received and was nominated to the ACAM awards in two categories (Best Metal Album and Best Artwork).

Sintagma changed the line-up after the first album was released and they had toured around Costa Rica. Aguilar and Mata left and were eventually replaced by Vinicio Barrantes (bass guitar) and Jacobo Chaverri (vocals). Their second album, Vestigios, was released in limited quantities in 2009 after problems with manufacture and the band broke up shortly after. A tribute concert to the band was held on 19 September and their "last" concert took place on 1 October 2009.

In 2018, Sintagma reunited and began working on their third album. Their first reunion show took place at the Transitarte festival on 16 March 2019. They signed with the Latin American branch of Long Beach Records.

== Members ==
- Ricardo Chamberlain "Chamber" (guitar)
- José Soto (drums)
- Vinicio Barrantes (bass guitar)
- Jacobo Chaverri (vocals)
- Mauricio Mora (guitar)

== Discography ==
- D100D D A I (2003)
- Vestigios (2009)
