= Building a Better =

Building a Better ______

Studio album by Park
- Released: July 25, 2006
- Genre: Indie rock
- Length: 44:20
- Label: Lobster, Vega Vinyl
- Producer: Cameron Webb

Park chronology
It Won't Snow Where You're Going (2003)	Building a Better ______ (2006)

Professional ratings
Review scores
Source	Rating
AllMusic	4.0/5 stars

Building a Better ____ is the fourth full-length album by Illinois indie rock band Park. It was released in 2006.

The fourth word of the album's title is written in a similar style to that used in Mad Libs, as a blank with the word (noun) under it. This has led to some confusion on how to pronounce the title out loud. Frontman Ladd Mitchell has said they just refer to it as "Building..." or "Building a Better". The working title for the album had been "Building a Better Pirate", but the band changed it to a blank as they felt it was too whimsical. On July 22, 2008 Vega Vinyl released "Building a Better ______" on vinyl. An acoustic b-side entitled "Eraser" was later released online.

The album was the band's third on Lobster Records, and was the last album before the band's hiatus, which lasted until 2013.

Ladd Mitchell was the primary songwriter for the album. According to a lyric feature written by Ladd Mitchell for Euphonia Online, the album's lyrical content came from personal experiences of Mitchell such as relationships and dreams.

== Track listing ==
All tracks are written by Ladd Mitchell except where noted.

No.	Title	Writer(s)	Length
1.	"The Trophy Wife"	Alex Haycraft, Miles Logan, Ladd Mitchell, Justin Valenti	3:56
2.	"Mississippi Burning"		3:43
3.	"Who Is Aliandra"		3:39
4.	"Angles and Errors"		3:16
5.	"A Message"		3:45
6.	"Chica Chica"	Mitchell, Valenti	3:15
7.	"La Amoureux"	Haycraft, Logan, Mitchell, Valenti	4:05
8.	"Irukandji"		4:26
9.	"Intro"		2:12
10.	"Hide and Seek"	Logan, Mitchell, Valenti	5:01
11.	"A Message (Acoustic)" (Bonus track)		3:31

== Personnel ==
- Ladd Mitchell – Vocals, Guitar, Keys
- Justin Valenti – Guitar
- Alex Haycraft – Bass, Backing Vocals
- Miles Logan – Percussion
- Peter Munters – Additional Vocals
- Jody Pollock – Additional Vocals
