= It Won't Snow Where You're Going =

Studio album by Park
- Released: September 30, 2003
- Genre: Post-hardcore, indie rock
- Length: 39:25
- Label: Lobster
- Producer: Cameron Webb

Park chronology
| No Signal (2001) | It Won't Snow Where You're Going (2003) | Building a Better (2006) |

Professional ratings
Review scores
| Source | Rating |
|---|---|
| Allmusic | 4.0/5 stars |
| Punknews | 4.0/5 stars |
| Sputnikmusic | 4/5 |

It Won't Snow Where You're Going is the third full-length album by Illinois indie rock band Park. It was released in 2003 on Lobster Records. Although the album contained some dark references to suicide, the liner notes contained links for the International Suicide Prevention Program, and the American Foundation for Suicide Prevention, among others. The band addressed their choice of subject matter with the following statement within their CD liner notes:

"This album is purely an artistic interpretation of personal experiences. Although there are some references in certain songs suggesting suicide, by no means are they saying that suicide should be an option during a sad or upsetting time in life. If you or someone you know is ever in a situation where you feel suicidal, there is always someone to talk to; friends, family, or counselors."

== Track listing ==
All tracks are written by Ladd Mitchell.

| No. | Title | Length |
|---|---|---|
| 1. | "Gasoline Kisses For Everyone" | 4:24 |
| 2. | "Day One And Counting" | 3:47 |
| 3. | "Pomona For Empusa" | 4:17 |
| 4. | "Conversations With Emily" | 2:55 |
| 5. | "Which Wrist First" | 3:07 |
| 6. | "Numerous Murders" | 4:17 |
| 7. | "Dear Sweet Impaler" | 5:19 |
| 8. | "Your Latest Victim" | 2:36 |
| 9. | "This Would Be Easier If You Would Just Die" | 4:16 |
| 10. | "Codex Avellum" | 4:09 |

== Personnel ==
- Ladd Mitchell - Vocals, lead guitar
- Justin Valenti - Guitar
- Gabe Looker - Bass, vocals
- Miles Logan - Drums
