= No Signal =

Studio album by Park
- Released: November 6, 2001
- Genre: Indie rock
- Length: 48:31
- Label: Lobster
- Producer: Cameron Webb

Park chronology
| Scene 14 (1998) | No Signal (2001) | It Won't Snow Where You're Going (2003) |

Professional ratings
Review scores
| Source | Rating |
|---|---|
| Allmusic | 3.0/5 stars |
| Punknews | 4.5/5 stars |

No Signal is the second full-length album by Illinois indie rock band Park. It was released in 2001 on Lobster Records.

The final track "Untitled (Bonus Track)" is referred to as "AJS" during numerous live performances.

== Track listing ==
All tracks are written by Ladd Mitchell.

| No. | Title | Length |
|---|---|---|
| 1. | "The Ghost You Are" | 4:00 |
| 2. | "Trivet" | 2:59 |
| 3. | "S is for Susan" | 4:20 |
| 4. | "At Breakneck Speed" | 4:30 |
| 5. | "Swell" | 3:56 |
| 6. | "Know Your Enemy" | 4:09 |
| 7. | "Clue Me In" | 2:44 |
| 8. | "Wreck Simple" | 4:16 |
| 9. | "Here On and Out" | 4:18 |
| 10. | "Cover Up" | 5:11 |
| 11. | "Untitled" (AJS) | 3:45 |

== Personnel ==
- Ladd Mitchell - Vocals, lead guitar
- Justin Valenti - Guitar
- Miles Logan - Drums
- Tim Costello - Bass
