= Park (band) =

American rock band

- Origin: Springfield, Illinois
- Genres: Indie rock, post-hardcore, pop punk
- Years active: 1996–2007, 2013–present
- Label: Lobster Records
- Members: Ladd Mitchell; Miles Logan; Alex Haycraft; Brandon Carnes

Park is an American rock band, formed in Springfield, Illinois.

== Line-up ==
- Ladd Mitchell: Vocals, Guitar
- Alex Haycraft: Guitar
- Miles Logan: Drums
- Brandon Carnes: Bass

== Biography ==
Park is from Springfield, Illinois. They began in 1996 with Justin Valenti, Eric Lipe, Jon Heupel, and Andy Wildrick. After three shows as a trio Park played with one of Ladd Mitchell's former bands and Ladd joined Park a week later. Lipe and Heupel left in 2000 to pursue school and were replaced by Miles Logan and Timmy Costello. This current incarnation is the fourth major version of Park. Ladd Mitchell is the only member that has been in all four incarnations of Park.

In October 2001, Lobster Records released the Park album, No Signal. It was produced by Cameron Webb (Lit, Over It, Social Distortion, and later Silverstein).

With the release of No Signal, Park embarked on a yearlong North American tour. They then went home to write songs and returned to California for the recording of It Won't Snow Where You're Going, again produced by Cameron Webb, and released in November 2003. Park toured the US three times in 2004. In 2005, frontman Ladd Mitchell released a solo EP under the name A Times Beach Crush Factor. They released Building a Better in 2006 after another round of lineup changes. Webb returned to produce Building a Better, which the band described as "less riff oriented and more about song structure".

Park recorded a cover version of the Blink-182 song "Obvious", which was included in the compilation album A Tribute to Blink 182: Pacific Ridge Records Heroes of Pop-Punk, released by Pacific Ridge Records in 2006.

On February 3, 2007, a blog on the Park Myspace revealed that Ladd would be leaving the band for personal reasons, and the band would be breaking up. They reunited for a one-off show in St Louis, Missouri in January 2009.

Mitchell formed a new band, Tiger Tank, in 2011.

On May 17, 2013, it was announced by frontman Ladd Mitchell that they have reunited and are working on a new album.

On July 15, 2014, the band released a new 3-song EP titled Jacob the Rabbit.

On October 4, 2025, frontman Ladd Mitchell announced that they have recorded several songs with Lobster Records and Cameron Webb producing once again, and will be releasing them in the near future.

== Discography ==
=== EP Cassette ===
- Blue Screen (Self Released, 1996) - EP

=== 7 inch Vinyl ===
- The Sound of Sirens (Park/Civic Split) (Starry Night Records, 1997) Split 7 inch
- Mood Ring (Sam the Cat Records, 1997) - EP

=== EP ===
- Random and Scattered (Self Released, 2000) - EP
- Jacob the Rabbit (Bad Timing Records, 2014)
- the anagram ep (Lobster Records, 2026)

=== Full-Length Albums ===
- Scene 14 (Playing Field Records, 1999) - CD
- No Signal (Lobster Records, 2001) - CD
- It Won't Snow Where You're Going (Lobster Records, 2003) - CD
- Building A Better ______ (Lobster Records, 2006) - CD

=== DVDs ===
- Weathering a Summer (Self-released, 2007)
- Forming an End (self-released 2009)

=== Other ===
- Atmosphere Only Gets You So Far Compilation No Karma Recordings (1998) - Danyet
- How to be a Hero Compilation: Prize Fight Records (1999) - The Pandorian Adventures of Dan Rosenthal
- The Thrill of Being Common Compilation North of January Records (1999) - Ten Shy of Fifty
- Cover version of Obvious by Blink-182 appeared in A Tribute to Blink 182: Pacific Ridge Records Heroes of Pop-Punk
- Bother Me Tomorrow: An Indie Tribute to Creedence Clearwater Revival (2014) - "Fortunate Son"
