= Standfast =

Swedish band

- Origin: Stockholm, Sweden
- Genres: Pop
- Years active: 1997–present (inactive)
- Labels: EMI; Cheap Lullaby Records
- Members: Suzanne Mosson; Patrick Tucker

Standfast is a two-piece Swedish band, formed in 1997 and comprising the singer Suzanne Mosson and the guitarist Patrick Tucker. The duo is best known for its 2001 single, "Carcrashes".

== History ==
In 1997, Mosson met Tucker, then a studio and tour musician, in Stockholm and they decided to try their luck as a team. They rented a tiny rehearsal studio, acquired an 8-track recorder and a cheap red plastic organ and started writing and recording. They soon had enough songs to set out to obtain a record deal.

They wanted to present their songs to a record company in person, but EMI refused, telling them to send a demo or "forget it". Two days later they called and said they liked "No Longer" and wanted to sign the band.

Their first album, Standfast, was released in 2001 and a follow-up album, Beneath & Beyond, was released on August 28, 2007, on their own label, Beastie Music Records. It was recorded by Christoffer Lundqvist at his Aerosol Grey Machine studio on and off between September 2005 and July 2006.

Tucker's brother Ava played a number of various and odd-looking keyboards, Jens Jansson drums and Lundqvist recorded, produced, mixed, mastered and played bass guitar plus a large variety of instruments. The first single to be released from the album was "Devil".

== Discography ==
=== Studio albums ===
Year	Album	Label	Other Information
2001	Standfast	EMI Music Sweden	Singles prod by Arnthor. Album prod by P.Tucker/Alar Suurna
2007	Beneath & Beyond	Beastie Music Records	Recorded at AGM. Produced by Christoffer Lundqvist

=== Singles ===
- "Carcrashes"
- "Look At Me Now"
- "No Longer"

=== Singles from Beneath & Beyond ===
- "Devil" (Swedish release)
- "Bring Me Home" (Swedish release)
- "The Unknown" (Swedish release)

== In popular culture ==
- Standfast is well known in the Mandarin music scene because of the appearance of their track "Lullaby for Lucas" in the Hong Kong/Singapore movie, Turn Left, Turn Right.
- The single "Carcrashes" has been covered by the Taiwanese singer Valen Hsu.
- Two of Standfast's songs from the Beneath and Beyond album were used in Season 5 of the Showtime drama The L Word: "Love for Life" in Episode 9 ("Liquid Heat") and "Skin to Skin" Episode 10 ("Lifecycle").
