= Cappadonna Hits =

Compilation album by Cappadonna
- Released: November 20, 2001
- Genre: Hip hop
- Label: Sony
- Producer: Allah Mathematics, RZA, 4th Disciple

Cappadonna chronology
The Yin and the Yang (2001)	Cappadonna Hits (2001)	The Struggle (2003)

Professional ratings
Review scores
Source	Rating
AllMusic	3/5 stars

Cappadonna Hits is a greatest hits album by rapper Cappadonna. It contains songs from his first two albums, The Pillage and The Yin and the Yang.

== Track listing ==
1. "Super Model" (featuring: Ghostface Killah)
2. "Slang Editorial"
3. "Love Is the Message" (featuring: Raekwon)
4. "Oh-Donna" (featuring: Ghostface Killah)
5. "Run"
6. "We Know" (featuring: Jermaine Dupri, Da Brat)
7. "Black Boy"
8. "Bread of Life" (featuring: Killah Priest, Neonek)
9. "War Rats"
10. "Check for a Nigga"
11. "Dart Throwing" (featuring: Raekwon, Method Man)
12. "The Grits" (featuring: 8-Off)
