= Standfast (album) =

Studio album by Standfast
- Released: July 10, 2001
- Recorded: 1997 – 2000 in Stockholm, Sweden
- Genre: Pop
- Label: EMI Music

Standfast is the first album by Swedish duo Standfast, released on 10 July 2001.

== Background ==
Standfast was formed in 1997 by singer Suzanne Mosson and guitarist Patrick Turner. Prior to forming the band, Mosson worked as a TV interviewer in Sweden, while Turner was a studio and tour musician. The duo signed to EMI Records in 2000, who released their debut album to 28 countries worldwide the following year. The album experienced success in Europe and Southeast Asia with the single "Carcrashes". The song was not released in the UK over fears that the title would be offensive.

== Reception ==
In his November 2001 review, Riaan Wolmarans of the Mail & Guardian stated, "It's laid-back, melodic and gentle — the opener and hit single 'Carcrashes' is a good example of what to expect from the rest of the album — but it's versatile, too, with dancey beats coming up on tracks like 'Be My Sun'". He also claimed that, "the lyrics are not just empty pop rhymes — even the Internet and Bill Gates are addressed alongside the expected love and relationship material." Billboard named it as the best album of 2001.

== Track listing ==
1. "Carcrashes"
2. "All I Ask"
3. "No Longer"
4. "Look At Me Now"
5. "Shine On"
6. "Once Mine"
7. "Morningcharm"
8. "Braincheck"
9. "Be My Sun"
10. "Great Confusion"
11. "Lullaby For Lucas"
12. "他們的故事 (北歐浪漫民謠版)" (Taiwanese bonus track)
- The 2002 Taiwan edition of the album includes a Cantonese-language cover of "Carcrashes" by singer Valen Hsu.
