= Idle Will Kill =

Studio album by Osker
- Released: June 5, 2001
- Genre: Punk rock, pop-punk, emo
- Label: Epitaph

Osker chronology
Treatment 5 (2000)	Idle Will Kill (2001)

Professional ratings
Review scores
Source	Rating
Kerrang!	4/5 stars

Idle Will Kill is the second and final studio album by the American punk band Osker, released on Epitaph Records on June 5, 2001.

== Background and composition ==
In an interview with Mean Street magazine, guitarist and frontman Devon Williams discussed the thematic departure of the album compared to Osker's earlier work. He expressed that Idle Will Kill represented a period of personal growth, stating, "I think I have grown into my mind. I know who I am, and I have an identity." I know how I work. He explained that the underlying theme of the album focuses on self-reliance and the realization that human relationships can often be overbearing or disappointing.

== Reception ==
Idle Will Kill marked a stylistic departure from the faster pop-punk approach of the band's debut, Treatment 5, opening with the acoustic-driven "Patience". Writing for Mean Street, Stephen Rafael called the album "a huge and unexpected step forward" for the band musically. In a retrospective review, critic Darryl Sterdan described the record's "churning emo-punk" as charting one of the most impressive artistic growth spurts in indie rock.

== Track listing ==
All tracks are written by Devon Williams.

No.	Title	Length
1.	"Patience"	1:16
2.	"Strangled"	2:58
3.	"Animal"	2:47
4.	"Contention"	3:23
5.	"Motionless"	3:05
6.	"Piece by Piece"	2:16
7.	"The Body"	3:44
8.	"Kinetic"	4:59
9.	"The Mistakes You Make"	3:03
10.	"Out of Touch"	3:10
11.	"Back to You"	2:39
12.	"Disconnect, Disconnect"	4:58
13.	"Going on the Instincts"	2:03
14.	"Anchor"	3:54

== Personnel ==
- Devon Williams – vocals
- Dave "The Dholi" – bass
- Ty – drums
- Mike Trujillo – producer, mixing, photography
- Rob Schnapf – mixing
