= Garou discography =

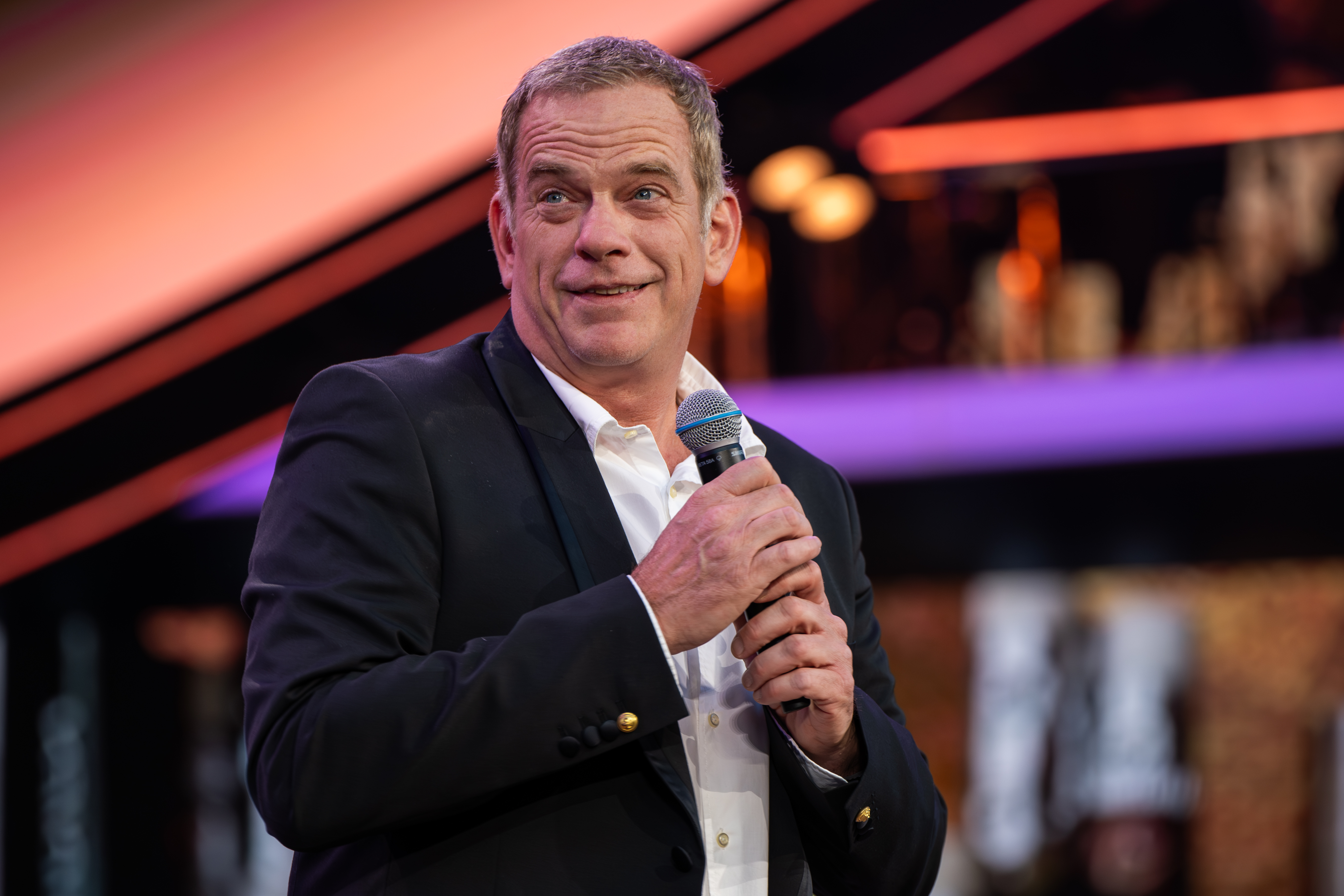
Garou in 2025

This is the discography for Canadian pop singer Garou.

== Studio albums ==
Year	Title	Chart positions						Sales and certifications
Year	Title	CAN	FR	BEL (Fl)	BEL (Wa)	SWI	POL	Sales and certifications
2000	Seul: 1st studio album; Released: 13 November 2000	2	1	—	1	9	1	MC: 3× Platinum; BEA: 2× Platinum; IFPI: 2× Platinum; IFPI SWI: 2× Platinum; SNEP: Diamond; ZPAV: Platinum
2003	Reviens: 2nd studio album; Released: 10 May 2003	—	3	—	1	5	2	BEA: Gold; SNEP: 2× Platinum; IFPI SWI: Gold; ZPAV: Gold
2006	Garou: 3rd studio album; Released: 3 July 2006	6	1	—	1	5	24	SNEP: Platinum
2008	Piece of My Soul: 4th studio album (1st English album); Released: 6 May 2008	2	3	—	3	8	7	MC: Gold; ZPAV: Gold
2009	Gentleman cambrioleur: 5th studio album; Released: 4 December 2009	—	35	—	15	30	17	SNEP: Gold
2010	Version intégrale: 6th studio album; Released: 29 November 2010	30	33	—	—	—	20	
2012	Rhythm and Blues: 7th studio album; Released: 24 September 2012	—	2	154	2	—	18	SNEP: 2× Platinum
2013	Au milieu de ma vie: 8th studio album; Released: 18 November 2013	—	5	167	2	11	—	SNEP: 2× Platinum
2014	It's Magic!: 9th studio album; Released: 1 December 2014	13	12	—	5	23	—	SNEP: Platinum
2019	Soul City: 10th studio album; Released: 1 November 2019	27	8	175	5	8	—	
2022	Garou joue Dassin: 11th studio album; Released: 4 November 2022	—	15	—	3	24	—	
2025	Un meilleur lendemain: 12th studio album; Released: 4 April 2025	—	—	—	3	34	—	

== Compilation albums ==
Year	Title	Chart positions	
Year	Title	FR	BEL (Wa)
2014	Le Meilleur: 1st compilation album; Released: 11 November 2014	34	12

== Live albums ==
Year	Title	Chart positions				Sales and certifications
Year	Title	FR	BEL (Wa)	SWI	POL	Sales and certifications
2001	Seul... avec vous: 1st live album; Released: 6 November 2001	3	5	20	9	MC: Gold; BEA: Platinum; IFPI SWI: Gold; SNEP: Platinum

- Other works
  - "Dust in the Wind" in William Joseph's album : "Within" (2004)
  - "La Rivière de notre enfance" with Michel Sardou (2004)
  - "Tu es comme ça" with Marilou (2005)

== Singles ==
Year	Title	CAN	FR	BEL (Wa) Ultratop	BEL (Wa) Ultratip	SWI	Album
1998	"Belle" (With Daniel Lavoie & Patrick Fiori)	—	—	1	—	1	Notre Dame de Paris
1999	"Dieu que le monde est injuste"	—	—	56	—	—	Notre Dame de Paris
2000	"Seul"	—	1	1	—	10	Seul
2001	"Je n'attendais que vous"	—	34	20	—	—	Seul
2001	"Sous le vent" (Duet with Celine Dion)	14	1	1	—	2	Seul
2001	"Gitan"	—	—	—	—	—	Seul
2002	"Le monde est stone"	—	27	20	—	—	Seul... avec vous
2003	"Reviens (Où te caches-tu?)"	—	9	10	—	23	Reviens
2004	"Et si on dormait"	—	—	—	2^{A}	85	Reviens
2004	"Passe ta route"	—	—	—	—	—	Reviens
2004	"La Rivière de notre enfance" (Duet with Michel Sardou)	—	1	1	—	14	Reviens
2005	"Tu es comme ça" (Duet with Marilou)	—	10	4	—	23	La fille qui chante (Marilou)
2006	"L'Injustice"	—	11	17	—	44	Garou
2006	"Je suis le même"^{B}	1^{B}	—	—	8^{A}	—	Garou
2006	"Plus fort que moi"^{C}	—	—	—	—	—	Garou
2006	"Que le temps"	—	—	—	—	—	Garou
2008	"Stand Up"^{D}	68	—	—	6^{A}	—	Piece of My Soul
2008	"Heaven's Table"	96	—	—	—	—	Piece of My Soul
2009	"First Day of My Life"	—	—	—	13^{A}	—	Piece of My Soul
2010	"J'avais besoin d'être là"	—	—	—	8^{A}	—	Version intégrale
2012	"Le jour se lève..."	—	115	—	22^{A}	—	Rhythm and Blues
2012	"Sur la route"	—	—	—	28^{A}	—	Rhythm and Blues
2013	"Quand tu danses"	—	—	—	38^{A}	—	Rhythm and Blues
2013	"Avancer"	—	57	31	—	73	Au milieu de ma vie
2014	"Du vent, des mots" (with Charlotte Cardin)	—	131	—	7^{A}	—	
2014	"Petit garçon" (with Ryan)	—	3	—	—	—	

Footnotes:

- ^{A} Peak is for the Belgian Ultratip charts.
- ^{B} "Je suis le même" hit #1 in Quebec for seven weeks.
- ^{C} "Plus forte que moi" was released as the second radio single from Garou in Quebec.
- ^{D} "Stand Up" peaked at #3 on the Top 100 BDS Anglophone chart in Quebec and #19 on the National AC audience chart (BDS).

== Single certifications ==
- "Belle": Diamond - France (750,000)
- "Seul": Diamond - France (990,000); Platinum - Belgium (50,000), Switzerland (40,000)
- "Sous le vent": Diamond - France (750,000)
- "Reviens (Où te caches-tu?)": Silver - France (125,000)
- "La Rivière de notre enfance": Gold - France (425,000)
- "Tu es comme ça": Silver - France (125,000)
