= List of number-one singles of 2001 (France) =

This is a list of the French SNEP Top 100 Singles and Top 150 Albums number-ones of 2001.

== Number-one by week ==
=== Singles Chart ===
Week	Issue date	Artist	Single
1	January 6	Alizée	"L'Alizé"
2	January 13	Garou	"Seul"
3	January 20	Garou	"Seul"
4	January 27	Garou	"Seul"
5	February 3	Garou	"Seul"
6	February 10	Garou	"Seul"
7	February 17	Garou	"Seul"
8	February 24	Garou	"Seul"
9	March 3	Garou	"Seul"
10	March 10	Garou	"Seul"
11	March 17	Garou	"Seul"
12	March 24	Garou	"Seul"
13	March 31	Shaggy featuring Rikrok	"It Wasn't Me"
14	April 7	Shaggy featuring Rikrok	"It Wasn't Me"
15	April 14	Shaggy featuring Rikrok	"It Wasn't Me"
16	April 21	Shaggy featuring Rikrok	"It Wasn't Me"
17	April 28	Shaggy featuring Rikrok	"It Wasn't Me"
18	May 5	Shaggy featuring Rikrok	"It Wasn't Me"
19	May 12	Shaggy featuring Rikrok	"It Wasn't Me"
20	May 19	Shaggy featuring Rikrok	"It Wasn't Me"
21	May 26	Shaggy featuring Rikrok	"It Wasn't Me"
22	June 2	Shaggy featuring Rikrok	"It Wasn't Me"
23	June 9	MC Solaar	"Hasta la Vista"
24	June 16	MC Solaar	"Hasta la Vista"
25	June 23	MC Solaar	"Hasta la Vista"
26	June 30	MC Solaar	"Hasta la Vista"
27	July 7	MC Solaar	"Hasta la Vista"
28	July 14	Les Lofteurs	"Up and Down"
29	July 21	Les Lofteurs	"Up and Down"
30	July 28	Les Lofteurs	"Up and Down"
31	August 4	Les Lofteurs	"Up and Down"
32	August 11	Les Lofteurs	"Up and Down"
33	August 18	Les Lofteurs	"Up and Down"
34	August 25	Les Lofteurs	"Up and Down"
35	September 1	Geri Halliwell	"It's Raining Men"
36	September 8	Geri Halliwell	"It's Raining Men"
37	September 15	Geri Halliwell	"It's Raining Men"
38	September 22	Geri Halliwell	"It's Raining Men"
39	September 29	Geri Halliwell	"It's Raining Men"
40	October 6	Mary J. Blige	"Family Affair"
41	October 13	Michael Jackson	"You Rock My World"
42	October 20	Michael Jackson	"You Rock My World"
43	October 27	Michael Jackson	"You Rock My World"
44	November 3	Garou & Céline Dion	"Sous le vent"
45	November 10	Garou & Céline Dion	"Sous le vent"
46	November 17	Garou & Céline Dion	"Sous le vent"
47	November 24	Kylie Minogue	"Can't Get You Out of My Head"
48	December 1	L5	"Toutes les femmes de ta vie"
49	December 8	Star Academy	"La musique"
50	December 15	Star Academy	"La musique"
51	December 22	Star Academy	"La musique"
52	December 29	Star Academy	"La musique"

=== Albums Chart ===
Week	Issue date	Artist	Title
1	6 January	Roméo et Juliette	Roméo et Juliette
2	13 January	Manu Chao	Clandestino
3	20 January	Garou	Seul
4	27 January	DJ Kost & Goldfinger	Double Face 3
5	3 February	Alizée	Gourmandises
6	10 February	Garou	Seul
7	17 February	Garou	Seul
8	24 February	Garou	Seul
9	3 March	Garou	Seul
10	10 March	Les Enfoirés	2001 : l'odyssée des Enfoirés
11	17 March	Les Enfoirés	2001 : l'odyssée des Enfoirés
12	24 March	Les Enfoirés	2001 : l'odyssée des Enfoirés
13	31 March	Les Enfoirés	2001 : l'odyssée des Enfoirés
14	7 April	Les Enfoirés	2001 : l'odyssée des Enfoirés
15	15 April	Les Enfoirés	2001 : l'odyssée des Enfoirés
16	21 April	Dido	No Angel
17	28 April	Dido	No Angel
18	5 May	Dido	No Angel
19	12 May	Dido	No Angel
20	19 May	Depeche Mode	Exciter
21	26 May	Yann Tiersen	Amélie Poulain
22	2 June	Yann Tiersen	Amélie Poulain
23	9 June	Manu Chao	Próxima Estación: Esperanza
24	16 June	Manu Chao	Próxima Estación: Esperanza
25	23 June	Manu Chao	Próxima Estación: Esperanza
26	30 June	Manu Chao	Próxima Estación: Esperanza
27	7 July	Manu Chao	Próxima Estación: Esperanza
28	14 July	Manu Chao	Próxima Estación: Esperanza
29	21 July	Manu Chao	Próxima Estación: Esperanza
30	28 July	Manu Chao	Próxima Estación: Esperanza
31	4 August	Manu Chao	Próxima Estación: Esperanza
32	11 August	Manu Chao	Próxima Estación: Esperanza
33	18 August	Yannick Noah	Yannick Noah
34	25 August	Manu Chao	Próxima Estación: Esperanza
35	1 September	Björk	Vespertine
36	8 September	Jamiroquai	A Funk Odyssey
37	15 September	Noir Désir	Des visages des figures
38	22 September	Noir Désir	Des visages des figures
39	29 September	Noir Désir	Des visages des figures
40	6 October	Noir Désir	Des visages des figures
41	13 October	Noir Désir	Des visages des figures
42	20 October	Zazie	La Zizanie
43	27 October	Zazie	La Zizanie
44	3 November	Michael Jackson	Invincible
45	10 November	Michael Jackson	Invincible
46	17 November	Michael Jackson	Invincible
47	24 November	Jean-Jacques Goldman	Chansons pour les pieds
48	1 December	Jean-Jacques Goldman	Chansons pour les pieds
49	8 December	Jean-Jacques Goldman	Chansons pour les pieds
50	15 December	L5	L5
51	22 December	L5	L5
52	29 December	L5	L5

== Top Ten Best Sales ==
This is the ten best-selling singles and albums in 2001.

=== Singles ===
Pos.	Artist	Title
1	Star Academy 1	"La musique"
2	L5	"Toutes les femmes de ta vie"
3	Garou	"Seul"
4	Daddy DJ	"Daddy DJ"
5	Les Lofteurs	"Up and Down"
6	Geri Halliwell	"It's Raining Men"
7	Shaggy & Rikrok	"It Wasn't Me"
8	Kylie Minogue	"Can't Get You Out of My Head"
9	Lorie	"Près de moi"
10	Garou & Céline Dion	"Sous le vent"

=== Albums ===
Pos.	Artist	Title
1	Garou	Seul
2	Jean-Jacques Goldman	Chansons pour les pieds
3	Dido	No Angel
4	Manu Chao	Próxima Estación: Esperanza
5	L5	L5
6	Gérald de Palmas	Marcher dans le sable
7	Les Enfoirés	2001, l'Odyssée des Enfoirés
8	Noir Désir	Des visages des figures
9	MC Solaar	Cinquième As
10	Yannick Noah	Yannick Noah

== See also ==
- 2001 in music
- List of number-one hits (France)
- List of artists who reached number one on the French Singles Chart
