= List of number-one singles of 2004 (France) =

This is a list of the French SNEP Top 100 Singles and Top 150 albums number-ones of 2004.

== Number-one by week ==
=== Singles chart ===
| Week | Issue Date | Artist | Single |
|---|---|---|---|
| 1 | January 3 | Star Academy 3 | "L'Orange" / "Wot" |
| 2 | January 10 | Tragédie | "Sexy pour moi" |
| 3 | January 17 | Star Academy 3 | "L'Orange" / "Wot" |
| 4 | January 24 | Kareen Antonn and Bonnie Tyler | "Si demain... (Turn Around)" |
| 5 | January 31 | The Black Eyed Peas | "Shut Up" |
| 6 | February 7 | Kareen Antonn and Bonnie Tyler | "Si demain...(Turn Around)" |
| 7 | February 14 | Kareen Antonn and Bonnie Tyler | "Si demain...(Turn Around)" |
| 8 | February 21 | Kareen Antonn and Bonnie Tyler | "Si demain...(Turn Around)" |
| 9 | February 28 | Kareen Antonn and Bonnie Tyler | "Si demain...(Turn Around)" |
| 10 | March 6 | Kareen Antonn and Bonnie Tyler | "Si demain...(Turn Around)" |
| 11 | March 13 | Kareen Antonn and Bonnie Tyler | "Si demain...(Turn Around)" |
| 12 | March 20 | Kareen Antonn and Bonnie Tyler | "Si demain...(Turn Around)" |
| 13 | March 27 | J-five featuring Charlie Chaplin | "Modern Times" |
| 14 | April 3 | Kareen Antonn & Bonnie Tyler | "Si demain...(Turn Around)" |
| 15 | April 10 | Kareen Antonn & Bonnie Tyler | "Si demain...(Turn Around)" |
| 16 | April 17 | Usher featuring Lil Jon and Ludacris | "Yeah!" |
| 17 | April 24 | O-Zone | "Dragostea din tei" |
| 18 | May 1 | O-Zone | "Dragostea din tei" |
| 19 | May 8 | O-Zone | "Dragostea din tei" |
| 20 | May 15 | O-Zone | "Dragostea din tei" |
| 21 | May 22 | O-Zone | "Dragostea din tei" |
| 22 | May 29 | O-Zone | "Dragostea din tei" |
| 23 | June 5 | O-Zone | "Dragostea din tei" |
| 24 | June 12 | O-Zone | "Dragostea din tei" |
| 25 | June 19 | O-Zone | "Dragostea din tei" |
| 26 | June 26 | O-Zone | "Dragostea din tei" |
| 27 | July 3 | O-Zone | "Dragostea din tei" |
| 28 | July 10 | O-Zone | "Dragostea din tei" |
| 29 | July 17 | O-Zone | "Dragostea din tei" |
| 30 | July 24 | O-Zone | "Dragostea din tei" |
| 31 | July 31 | O-Zone | "Dragostea din tei" |
| 32 | August 7 | K-Maro | "Femme Like U" |
| 33 | August 14 | Aventura | "Obsesión" |
| 34 | August 21 | Aventura | "Obsesión" |
| 35 | August 28 | Aventura | "Obsesión" |
| 36 | September 4 | Aventura | "Obsesión" |
| 37 | September 11 | Aventura | "Obsesión" |
| 38 | September 18 | Aventura | "Obsesión" |
| 39 | September 25 | Aventura | "Obsesión" |
| 40 | October 2 | Star Academy 4 | "Laissez-moi danser" |
| 41 | October 9 | Star Academy 4 | "Laissez-moi danser" |
| 42 | October 16 | Star Academy 4 | "Laissez-moi danser" |
| 43 | October 23 | Star Academy 4 | "Laissez-moi danser" |
| 44 | October 30 | Star Academy 4 | "Laissez-moi danser" |
| 45 | November 6 | Star Academy 4 | "Laissez-moi danser" |
| 46 | November 13 | Tragédie | "Gentleman" |
| 47 | November 20 | Starsailor | "Four to the Floor" |
| 48 | November 27 | Garou and Michel Sardou | "La Rivière de notre enfance" |
| 49 | December 4 | Garou and Michel Sardou | "La Rivière de notre enfance" |
| 50 | December 11 | Garou and Michel Sardou | "La Rivière de notre enfance" |
| 51 | December 18 | Garou and Michel Sardou | "La Rivière de notre enfance" |
| 52 | December 25 | Garou and Michel Sardou | "La Rivière de notre enfance" |
| 53 | December 31 | Star Academy 4 | "Adieu monsieur le professeur" |

=== Albums chart ===
| Week | Issue Date | Artist | Title |
|---|---|---|---|
| 1 | January 3 | Star Academy 3 | Les Meilleurs moments |
| 2 | January 10 | Indochine | 3.6.3 |
| 3 | January 17 | Indochine | 3.6.3 |
| 4 | January 24 | Lorie | Attitudes |
| 5 | January 31 | Lorie | Attitudes |
| 6 | February 7 | Lorie | Attitudes |
| 7 | February 14 | Norah Jones | Feels Like Home |
| 8 | February 21 | Norah Jones | Feels Like Home |
| 9 | February 28 | Norah Jones | Feels Like Home |
| 10 | March 6 | Les Enfoirés | Les Enfoirés dans l'Espace |
| 11 | March 13 | Les Enfoirés | Les Enfoirés dans l'Espace |
| 12 | March 20 | Pascal Obispo | Live Fan, Studio Fan |
| 13 | March 27 | Les Enfoirés | Les Enfoirés dans l'Espace |
| 14 | April 3 | Calogero | 3 |
| 15 | April 10 | Vincent Delerm | Kensington Square |
| 16 | April 17 | Les Choristes | Bande originale |
| 17 | April 24 | Les Choristes | Bande originale |
| 18 | May 1 | Les Choristes | Bande originale |
| 19 | May 8 | Michel Sardou | Du Plaisir |
| 20 | May 15 | Michel Sardou | Du Plaisir |
| 21 | May 22 | Francis Cabrel | Les Beaux Dégâts |
| 22 | May 29 | Francis Cabrel | Les Beaux Dégâts |
| 23 | June 5 | Francis Cabrel | Les Beaux Dégâts |
| 24 | June 12 | Francis Cabrel | Les Beaux Dégâts |
| 25 | June 19 | Francis Cabrel | Les Beaux Dégâts |
| 26 | June 26 | Les Choristes | Bande originale |
| 27 | July 3 | Les Choristes | Bande originale |
| 28 | July 10 | Les Choristes | Bande originale |
| 29 | July 17 | Les Choristes | Bande originale |
| 30 | July 24 | Les Choristes | Bande originale |
| 31 | July 31 | Placebo | Sleeping With Ghosts |
| 32 | August 8 | Calogero | 3 |
| 33 | August 15 | Aventura | We Broke the Rules |
| 34 | August 21 | Yannick Noah | Pokhara |
| 35 | August 28 | Yannick Noah | Pokhara |
| 36 | September 4 | Björk | Medúlla |
| 37 | September 11 | Björk | Medúlla |
| 38 | September 18 | Véronique Sanson | Longue distance |
| 39 | September 25 | Ben Harper & The Blind Boys of Alabama | There Will Be a Light |
| 40 | October 2 | Ben Harper & The Blind Boys of Alabama | There Will Be a Light |
| 41 | October 9 | Arielle Dombasle | Amor Amor |
| 42 | October 16 | Chimène Badi | Dis-moi que tu m'aimes |
| 43 | October 23 | Bernard Lavilliers | Carnets de bord |
| 44 | October 30 | Gérald de Palmas | Un Homme sans racines |
| 45 | November 6 | Les Choristes | Bande originale |
| 46 | November 13 | Florent Pagny | Baryton |
| 47 | November 20 | Eminem | Encore |
| 48 | November 27 | U2 | How To Dismantle An Atomic Bomb |
| 49 | December 4 | Florent Pagny | Baryton |
| 50 | December 11 | Florent Pagny | Baryton |
| 51 | December 18 | Les Choristes | Bande originale |
| 52 | December 25 | Les Choristes | Bande originale |

== Top ten best sales ==
This is the ten best-selling singles and albums in 2004.

=== Singles ===
| Pos. | Artist | Title |
|---|---|---|
| 1 | O-Zone | "Dragostea din tei" |
| 2 | K'Maro | "Femme Like U" |
| 3 | Aventura | "Obsesión" |
| 4 | Kareen Antonn & Bonnie Tyler | "Si demain... (Turn Around)" |
| 5 | Star Academy 4 | "Laissez-moi danser" |
| 6 | The Black Eyed Peas | "Shut Up" |
| 7 | Leslie & Amine | "Sobri (notre destin)" |
| 8 | T-Rio | "Choopeta (Mamae eu quero)" |
| 9 | Le 6–9 | "Le Poulailler" |
| 10 | Garou & Michel Sardou | "La Rivière de notre enfance" |

=== Albums ===
| Pos. | Artist | Title |
|---|---|---|
| 1 | Les Choristes | Bande originale |
| 2 | Calogero | 3 |
| 3 | Michel Sardou | Du Plaisir |
| 4 | Norah Jones | Feels Like Home |
| 5 | Yannick Noah | Pokhara |
| 6 | Francis Cabrel | Les Beaux Dégâts |
| 7 | Les Enfoirés | Les Enfoirés dans l'Espace |
| 8 | Corneille | Parce qu'on vient de loin |
| 9 | Kyo | Le Chemin |
| 10 | Lorie | Attitudes |

== See also ==
- 2004 in music
- List of number-one hits (France)
- List of artists who reached number one on the French Singles Chart
