= List of Ultratop 40 number-one singles of 2002 =

This is a list of songs that topped the Belgian Walloon (francophone) Ultratop 40 in 2002.

| Issue Date | Artist | Title |
|---|---|---|
| January 5 | Star Academy | La Musique (Angelica) |
| January 12 | Star Academy | La Musique (Angelica) |
| January 19 | Star Academy | La Musique (Angelica) |
| January 26 | Star Academy | La Musique (Angelica) |
| February 2 | Star Academy | La Musique (Angelica) |
| February 9 | Star Academy | La Musique (Angelica) |
| February 16 | Star Academy | La Musique (Angelica) |
| February 23 | Garou and Céline Dion | Sous le vent |
| March 2 | Pink | Get the Party Started |
| March 9 | Pink | Get the Party Started |
| March 16 | Mario Barravecchia | On Se Ressemble |
| March 23 | Mario Barravecchia | On Se Ressemble |
| March 30 | Shakira | Whenever, Wherever |
| April 6 | Jean-Pascal | L'agitateur |
| April 13 | Jean-Pascal | L'agitateur |
| April 20 | Jean-Pascal | L'agitateur |
| April 27 | Jean-Pascal | L'agitateur |
| May 4 | Jean-Pascal | L'agitateur |
| May 11 | Jean-Pascal | L'agitateur |
| May 18 | Jean-Pascal | L'agitateur |
| May 25 | Jean-Pascal | L'agitateur |
| June 1 | Tiziano Ferro | Perdono |
| June 8 | Jean-Pascal | L'agitateur |
| June 15 | Eminem | Without Me |
| June 22 | Eminem | Without Me |
| June 29 | Eminem | Without Me |
| July 6 | Marlène Duval and Phil Barney | Un Enfant de toi |
| July 13 | Marlène Duval and Phil Barney | Un Enfant de toi |
| July 20 | Marlène Duval and Phil Barney | Un Enfant de toi |
| July 27 | Marlène Duval and Phil Barney | Un Enfant de toi |
| August 3 | Indochine | J'ai demandé à la lune |
| August 10 | Indochine | J'ai demandé à la lune |
| August 17 | Indochine | J'ai demandé à la lune |
| August 24 | Indochine | J'ai demandé à la lune |
| August 31 | Indochine | J'ai demandé à la lune |
| September 7 | Las Ketchup | The Ketchup Song (Asereje) |
| September 14 | Las Ketchup | The Ketchup Song (Asereje) |
| September 21 | Las Ketchup | The Ketchup Song (Asereje) |
| September 28 | Las Ketchup | The Ketchup Song (Asereje) |
| October 5 | Las Ketchup | The Ketchup Song (Asereje) |
| October 12 | Las Ketchup | The Ketchup Song (Asereje) |
| October 19 | Las Ketchup | The Ketchup Song (Asereje) |
| October 26 | Las Ketchup | The Ketchup Song (Asereje) |
| November 2 | Las Ketchup | The Ketchup Song (Asereje) |
| November 9 | Las Ketchup | The Ketchup Song (Asereje) |
| November 16 | Las Ketchup | The Ketchup Song (Asereje) |
| November 23 | Las Ketchup | The Ketchup Song (Asereje) |
| November 30 | Las Ketchup | The Ketchup Song (Asereje) |
| December 7 | Las Ketchup | The Ketchup Song (Asereje) |
| December 14 | Las Ketchup | The Ketchup Song (Asereje) |
| December 21 | Las Ketchup | The Ketchup Song (Asereje) |
| December 28 | Las Ketchup | The Ketchup Song (Asereje) |

== Best-selling singles ==
This is the ten best-selling/performing singles in 2002

| Pos. | Artist | Title | HP | Weeks |
|---|---|---|---|---|
| 1 | Las Ketchup | "Asereje" | 1 | 18 |
| 2 | Jean-Pascal Lacoste | "L'agitateur" | 1 | 23 |
| 3 | Shakira | "Whenever, Wherever" | 1 | 28 |
| 4 | Umberto Tozzi and Lena Ka | "Rien que des mots (Ti amo)" | 2 | 17 |
| 5 | Indochine | "J'ai demandé à la lune" | 1 | 36 |
| 6 | Tiziano Ferro | "Perdono" | 1 | 24 |
| 7 | Natasha St-Pier | "Tu trouveras" | 3 | 31 |
| 8 | Eminem | "Without Me | 1 | 22 |
| 9 | Rohff | "Qui est l'exemple?" | 5 | 22 |
| 10 | Mad'House | "Like a Prayer" | 3 | 23 |

== See also ==
- 2002 in music
