= Ultratop 40 number-one hits of 2001 =

This is a list of songs that topped the Belgian Walloon (francophone) Ultratop 40 in 2001.

Date	Title	Artist
January 6	"Seul"	Garou
January 13	"Seul"	Garou
January 20	"Seul"	Garou
January 27	"Seul"	Garou
February 3	"Seul"	Garou
February 10	"Seul"	Garou
February 17	"Seul"	Garou
February 24	"Seul"	Garou
March 3	"Wazzuup!"	Da Muttz
March 10	"Wazzuup!"	Da Muttz
March 17	"Wazzuup!"	Da Muttz
March 24	"Wazzuup!"	Da Muttz
March 31	"Wazzuup!"	Da Muttz
April 7	"Daddy DJ"	Daddy DJ
April 14	"Daddy DJ"	Daddy DJ
April 21	"Daddy DJ"	Daddy DJ
April 28	"Daddy DJ"	Daddy DJ
May 5	"Daddy DJ"	Daddy DJ
May 12	"Daddy DJ"	Daddy DJ
May 19	"Daddy DJ"	Daddy DJ
May 26	"Daddy DJ"	Daddy DJ
June 2	"Daddy DJ"	Daddy DJ
June 9	"Daddy DJ"	Daddy DJ
June 16	"J'voulais"	Sully Sefil
June 23	"J'voulais"	Sully Sefil
June 30	"J'voulais"	Sully Sefil
July 7	"J'voulais"	Sully Sefil
July 14	"J'voulais"	Sully Sefil
July 21	"J'voulais"	Sully Sefil
July 28	"J'voulais"	Sully Sefil
August 4	"J'voulais"	Sully Sefil
August 11	"Près de moi"	Lorie
August 18	"Près de moi"	Lorie
August 25	"Près de moi"	Lorie
September 1	"À ma place"	Axel Bauer and Zazie
September 8	"À ma place"	Axel Bauer and Zazie
September 15	"À ma place"	Axel Bauer and Zazie
September 22	"À ma place"	Axel Bauer and Zazie
September 29	"Let Me Blow Ya Mind"	Eve featuring Gwen Stefani
October 6	"Let Me Blow Ya Mind"	Eve featuring Gwen Stefani
October 13	"Let Me Blow Ya Mind"	Eve featuring Gwen Stefani
October 20	"Can't Get You Out of My Head"	Kylie Minogue
October 27	"Can't Get You Out of My Head"	Kylie Minogue
November 3	"Can't Get You Out of My Head"	Kylie Minogue
November 10	"Can't Get You Out of My Head"	Kylie Minogue
November 17	"Can't Get You Out of My Head"	Kylie Minogue
November 24	"Can't Get You Out of My Head"	Kylie Minogue
December 1	"Can't Get You Out of My Head"	Kylie Minogue
December 8	"Can't Get You Out of My Head"	Kylie Minogue
December 15	"La Musique (Angelica)"	Star Academy
December 22	"La Musique (Angelica)"	Star Academy
December 29	"La Musique (Angelica)"	Star Academy

== See also ==
- 2001 in music
