= Cash City =

1991 single by Luc De Larochellière

Single by Luc De Larochellière

from the album Sauvez mon âme
- B-side: "La machine est mon amie"
- Released: 1991
- Recorded: 1990
- Studio: Le Majeure, Montreal
- Genre: Pop, chanson
- Length: 4:33
- Label: Trema
- Songwriter: Luc De Larochellière

Luc De Larochellière singles chronology
"?"	"Cash City" (1991)	"Sauvez mon âme" (1992)

"Cash City" is a 1990 song recorded by Canadian singer-songwriter Luc De Larochellière. Written De Larochellière, this pop song was released in 1991 as the first single from his second album Sauvez mon âme which won the Félix Award for best album of the year. In Quebec, it was a hit, as the other singles from the album were also, but was De Larochellière's only charting single in France.

== Background and lyrics ==
De Larochelière explained that eight months passed between the single's release in France and the moment he started promoting it in the country, which led him to come regularly after his concerts in Quebec; however, he said he felt then he was used as a commercial product and disliked the fact that the marketing plan was out of his control. Lyrically, "Cash City" describes with irony a society marked by ostensible consumerism, insatiable search for money and importance of appearances.

== Critical reception ==
Agnès Gaudet of Le Journal de Montréal considers "Cash City" and "Sauvez mon âme" as songs "both joyful and engaged". A review in Pan-European magazine Music & Media describes "Cash City" as "the kind of song that could have easily fit in the folky repertoire of John Mellencamp in his Lonesome Jubilee period" and added that "the use of accordion gives it the right atmosphere for both the EHR and AC formats". De Larochelière said that in Africa, where he toured, the song was popular and people knew the lyrics by heart.

== Chart performance ==
In Quebec, Larochelière's home-country, "Cash City" spent seven weeks at number one on the airplay chart. In France, it debuted at number 48 on the chart edition of 23 November 1991, then performed the biggest jump of the week to reach number 25 and eventually peaked at number 11 twice, in its eighth and 13th weeks; it stayed in the top 20 for 11 weeks and in the top 50 for 20 weeks. It entered the European Hot 100 Singles at number 88 on 11 January 1992 and remained for ten non consecutive weeks on the chart, with a peak at number 60 in the third week.

== Cover versions ==
In 2006, De Larochellière recorded a new version of "Cash City" as a duet with French singer Francis Cabrel for his album Voix croisées. In 2012, Garou covered "Cash City" on his album Rhythm and Blues, a version which André Péloquin of Voir considered as recorded with a twang recalling Johnny Cash and Elvis Presley.

== Track listings ==
- 7" single
1. "Cash City" — 4:33
2. "La machine est mon amie" — 3:59
- CD single
1. "Cash City" — 4:33
2. "La machine est mon amie" — 3:59

== Personnel ==
- Artwork — FKGB
- Photography (first edition) — Flomen
- Photography (second edition) — J.F. Gratton

== Charts ==
Chart (1991–1992)	Peak position
Europe (European Hot 100)	60
France (Airplay Chart [AM Stations])	8
France (Airplay Chart [FM Stations])	3
France (SNEP)	11
Québec (Francophone chart)	1
