= Seul... avec vous =

Live album by Garou
- Released: 6 November 2001
- Genre: Pop
- Labels: Sony Music, Columbia

Garou chronology
Seul (2000)	Seul... avec vous (2001)	Reviens (2003)

Singles from Seul... avec vous
- 1. "Le Monde est stone" Released: April 2002

Professional ratings
Review scores
Source	Rating
Allmusic	3/5 stars

Seul... avec vous is the first live album by Canadian singer Garou. Recorded during Garou's 2001 concerts tour and released on 6 November 2001, this album contains many songs from his debut album, Seul, and other songs from the musical Notre-Dame de Paris, plus a cover version of "Le Monde est stone" in a studio version (this song was originally recorded for the French musical Starmania in 1977), which was the only single from this live album. Seul... avec vous met success in the Belgium and France, reaching the top five of the charts.

== Track listing ==
1. "Je n'attendais que vous" – 5:32
2. "Gitan" – 4:54
3. "Que l'amour est violent" – 6:08
4. "La Bohème" – 4:42
5. "Au plaisir de ton corps" – 4:34
6. "Ce soir on danse à Naziland" – 3:53
7. "Demande au soleil" – 5:33
8. "Belle" – 4:55
9. "Au Bout de mes rêves" – 4:03
10. "You Can Leave Your Hat On" – 4:08
11. "Medley R&B" – 8:59
  1. "Sex Machine"
  2. "Everybody"
  3. "Shout"
  4. "I Feel Good"
12. "Dieu que le monde est injuste" – 3:49
13. "Seul" – 5:47
14. "Le Monde est stone" (Studio Version) – 4:01

== Credits ==
- Recorded by Denis Savage and Éric Massicotte, with Piccolo Mobile Studio
- Mixed at Piccolo Studio (Montreal) by Denis Savage with Brian Mercier
- Mastering: Vlado Meller
- Conductor and guitarist: Éric Rock
- Choristers: Élise Duguay, Julie Leblanc, Francesco Verrecchia
- Keyboards: Michel Ferrari
- Drums kit: Sébastien Langlois
- Bass: Grégoire Morency
- Saxo: Dany Roy
- Trumpet: Roger Walls
- Guitars: Francesco Verrecchia
- Sound: Denis Ayotte, François Desjardins, Francis Gaudreau, Carl Gaudreau, Éric Massicotte
- Executive producer: Vito Luprano

== Certifications ==
Country	Certification	Date	Sales certified	Physical sales
Belgium	Platinum		50,000	
Canada	Gold	14 December 2001	50,000	
France	Platinum	2001	300,000	270,000 in 2001 + 187,000 in 2002
Switzerland	Gold	2003	20,000	

== Charts ==
=== Weekly charts ===
Chart (2001–2002)	Peak position
Belgian Albums (Ultratop Wallonia)	5
French Albums (SNEP)	3
Swiss Albums (Schweizer Hitparade)	20

=== Year-end charts ===
Chart (2001)	Position
Belgian Albums (Ultratop Wallonia)	63
French Albums (SNEP)	30

Chart (2002)	Position
Belgian Albums (Ultratop Wallonia)	44
French Albums (SNEP)	56
