= Can't Get You Out of My Head =

2001 single by Kylie Minogue

- Cover of CD2 and digital download

Single by Kylie Minogue

from the album Fever
- B-side: "Boy"; "Rendezvous at Sunset"
- Released: 8 September 2001
- Studio: Rob's (Surrey, England)
- Genre: Dance-pop; techno-pop; nu-disco
- Length: 3:50
- Label: Parlophone
- Songwriters: Cathy Dennis; Rob Davis
- Producers: Cathy Dennis; Rob Davis

Kylie Minogue singles chronology
"Your Disco Needs You" (2001)	"Can't Get You Out of My Head" (2001)	"In Your Eyes" (2002)

Music video
- "Can't Get You Out of My Head" on YouTube

"Can't Get You Out of My Head" is a song recorded by Australian singer Kylie Minogue for her eighth studio album, Fever (2001). Parlophone Records released the song as the album's lead single on 8 September 2001. "Can't Get You Out of My Head", which was written and produced by Cathy Dennis and Rob Davis, is a dance-pop, techno-pop and nu-disco song that is known for its "la la la" hook. Its lyrics are about an obsession with a love interest. Music critics praised the song's production and Minogue's vocals and labelled it a highlight of Fever.

The song reached number one on the charts in 40 countries worldwide. It peaked at number one on the UK Singles Chart for four weeks and was certified three-times platinum by the British Phonographic Industry (BPI). It also topped the Australian Singles Chart and received a three-times Platinum certification from the Australian Recording Industry Association. In the United States, the song peaked at number seven on the Billboard Hot 100 chart and became Minogue's first US top-ten single in 13 years. As of 2018, the track has sold over five million copies worldwide.

Dawn Shadforth directed the music video for "Can't Get You Out of My Head", which features Minogue dancing against futuristic backdrops; the white jumpsuit she wore in the video became a fashion statement. Since the song's release, Minogue has included it on the set lists of various concert tours. "Can't Get You Out of My Head" appeared on several decade-end lists compiled by media such as Rolling Stone, The Guardian and NME. In 2012, Minogue re-recorded the song for her orchestral compilation album The Abbey Road Sessions.

== Writing and release ==
In 2000, British singer-songwriter Cathy Dennis and English songwriter Rob Davis had been brought together by Universal Publishing to work on new music. The session for "Can't Get You Out of My Head" began with Davis generating a 125 bpm drum loop using the computer program Cubase. Dennis improvised with the line "I just can't get you out of my head", which later became the song's lyric. After three and a half hours, Davis and Dennis had recorded the demo for "Can't Get You Out of My Head" and the vocals were recorded the same day; the pair said the recording process was "very natural and fluid", and did not rely on heavy instrumentation.

Prior to pitching the song to Kylie Minogue, Davis and Dennis unsuccessfully offered it to S Club 7 and Sophie Ellis-Bextor. Davis then met with Minogue's A&R executive Jamie Nelson, who was impressed by the song's upbeat production and thought it would appeal to clubgoers. Nelson booked the song for Minogue to record. Although Davis thought the recording session would later be cancelled, Minogue wanted to record the song after hearing 20 seconds of the demo. The song was recorded at Davis's home studio in Surrey, England. The music, except the guitar part, was programmed using a Korg Triton workstation via a MIDI interface. Tim Orford was the mix engineer for the song. In a 2011 interview Dennis stated, "even though Kylie wasn't the first artist to be offered the song, I don't believe anyone else would have done the incredible job she did with it".

In 2001, Minogue embarked on the On a Night Like This tour to promote her seventh studio album Light Years (2000). She premiered "Can't Get You Out of My Head" on stage during the tour. It was later chosen as the lead single from Minogue's eighth studio album Fever, and released in September 2001, by Parlophone.

== Composition and lyrical interpretation ==
"Can't Get You Out of My Head"
A 21-second sample of "Can't Get You Out of My Head", a dance-pop, techno-pop and neo-disco song that contains a "pulsing" bassline. The song is known for its "la la la" hook.

"Can't Get You Out of My Head" is three minutes and 50 seconds long. In their book The New Rolling Stone Album Guide, Nathan Brackett and Christian David Hoard labelled it a neo-disco track. Justin Myers of the Official Charts Company characterized it as a dance-pop song, Stereogum's Tom Breihan described it as a techno-pop anthem, and AllMusic's Tim Sendra called it a "timeless new wave disco hit". "Can't Get You Out of My Head" is written in the key of A minor.

The song, which does not follow the common verse–chorus structure, is composed of numerous fragmented sections. According to Davis, it "breaks a few rules as it starts with a chorus and in comes the 'la's'". Minogue chants a "la la la" hook that is often noted as the song's most appealing part by music critics. According to BBC Radio 2, the song's composition is "deceptively simple, but its veins run with the whole history of electronic music". The writer described the song's bassline as "pulsing" and influenced by the music of English rock band New Order and German electronic music band Kraftwerk.

"Can't Get You Out of My Head" is about an obsession with an unknown person, who according to The Guardian's Dorian Lynskey could be "a partner, an evasive one-night stand or someone who doesn't know [the song's narrator] exists". Writing for the same newspaper, Everett True identified a "darker element" in the simple lyrics and said this sentiment is echoed in Minogue's restrained vocals. True also said while Minogue's earlier work presented an optimistic romantic future, "Can't Get You Out of My Head" focuses on an unhealthy and potentially destructive obsession. He noted in her earlier songs, Minogue played "the wide-eyed ingénue with alacrity" but that in this track, she is aware of the harmful nature of her infatuation, which True called a "desire that is wholly dependent on her own self-control".

In 2012, Minogue re-recorded "Can't Get You Out of My Head" for her orchestral compilation album The Abbey Road Sessions. The 2012 version of the song has an altered musical arrangement and uses a pizzicato playing technique in which the strings of a string instrument are continuously plucked.

== Critical reception ==
"Can't Get You Out of My Head" received acclaim from music critics for its production and Minogue's vocals. Chris True of AllMusic picked "Can't Get You Out of My Head" as a highlight of Fever, saying it "pulses and grooves like no other she's recorded". Entertainment Weekly's Jim Farber said the song "fully lives up to its title" and compared it to the music of American singer Andrea True. PopMatters's Jason Thompson described Minogue's vocals as a "sexual come on" and called the song "trim and funky". Dominique Leone of Pitchfork wrote that the song "exudes a catchiness that belies its inherent simplicity, so reassuring during an era when chart acts sound increasingly baroque and producers race to see who can ape electronic music trends first".

In 2012, The Guardian music critic Everett True defined "Can't Get You Out of My Head" as "one of those rare moments in pop: sleek and chic and stylish and damnably danceable, but with a darker element hidden in plain sight". In a 2014 retrospective review, Billboard's Jason Lipshutz praised Minogue's vocals and said they complement the production, and that; "her voice operates alongside it, finding renewed power in its drive". Olive Pometsey of GQ deemed it "the sound of the noughties", highlighting the synthesisers that create "a moment of pure pop perfection". Writing for the Herald Sun, Cameron Adams placed "Can't Get You Out of My Head" at the top of his list of Minogue's best songs and called it "a happy accident". Adams wrote, "if you could program a computer to formulate the perfect pop song, it would sound like this".

Reviewing The Abbey Road Sessions's version of the song, Tim Sendra of AllMusic said the "most interesting reboot" on the album took place on "Can't Get You Out of My Head", saying the "insistent strings push the song along with tightly coiled electricity that is impossible to resist". Sal Cinquemani of Slant Magazine chose the song as one of the album's highlights, saying its arrangement makes up for the absence of dance beats and vocal production. The Independent's Simon Price wrote while the original version of "Can't Get You Out of My Head" would be "impossible to improve on", the reworked version "turns it into a pizzicato thriller score". According to Jude Rogers of The Quietus, the song's orchestral treatment does not work well for its memorable electronic production.

In 2003, Q Magazine ranked "Can't Get You Out of My Head" at number 694 on their list of the 1001 Best Songs Ever. In 2011, Rolling Stone magazine placed it at number 45 on their 100 Best Songs of the 2000s list, noting Minogue "seduced the US with this mirror-ball classic". NME ranked the song at number 74 on their 100 Best Track of the Noughties list, saying it "encapsulated everything enviable in a well-crafted song" and that it is Minogue's best single. In 2012, Priya Elan of NME placed the song at number four on her The Greatest Pop Songs in History list. In 2012, The Guardian included the song on their list of The Best Number One Records in the United Kingdom, labelling it "sleek, Arctic-blue minimalism, like an emotionally thwarted retelling of Donna Summer's 'I Feel Love'". "Can't Get You Out of My Head" won the award for Best Single at the 2001 Top of the Pops Awards ceremony. At the 2002 ARIA Music Awards ceremony, it won the awards for Single of the Year and Highest-Selling Single, and Minogue won the Outstanding Achievement Award. In 2002, it won a Dutch Edison Award for Single of the Year. At the inaugural Premios Oye! in 2002, the song received a nomination in the Song of the Year category.

== Commercial performance ==
"Can't Get You Out of My Head" reached number one in 40 countries worldwide. In Australia, the song entered the singles chart at number one, marking Minogue's seventh number-one hit in the country, and would remain there for four consecutive weeks. The Australian Recording Industry Association certified it three-times Platinum, for shipments of over 210,000 copies. In the United Kingdom, it faced competition from Victoria Beckham's single "Not Such an Innocent Girl" (2001). On the 29 September 2001 UK Singles Chart, "Can't Get You Out of My Head" debuted at number one with first-week sales of 306,000 copies. It spent four weeks at number one and remained for 25 weeks in the UK's top 40. It was certified three-times Platinum by the British Phonographic Industry. As of 2021, it had sold over 1.53 million copies in the UK, and by 2013 it was the country's 75th best-selling single of all time.

In the United States, "Can't Get You Out of My Head" debuted on the Billboard Hot 100 chart in January 2002 and peaked at number seven the following March. The song soon became Minogue's best-selling US single since "The Loco-Motion" (1988). The Recording Industry Association of America certified "Can't Get You Out of My Head" Gold for shipments of over 500,000 copies. In Italy, the Federation of the Italian Music Industry (FIMI) certified the song three-times platinum with shipments of over 230,000 copies.

The song was also certified Gold in Belgium, and New Zealand, Platinum in Austria, France, Germany, Greece, the Netherlands, Norway, South Africa, Sweden, and Switzerland. As of February 2018, it is Minogue's highest-selling single with worldwide sales of over five million copies. In 2023, it was the 92nd best-selling single of all time in the UK.

== Music video ==
=== Development and synopsis ===
A scene from the song's music video where Minogue wears a white hooded jumpsuit

British director Dawn Shadforth directed the music video for "Can't Get You Out of My Head", which includes dance routines that were choreographed by American choreographer Michael Rooney. Minogue's looks—her youthfulness, slim figure and proportionally large mouth–had attracted comments on her exotic image; the British tabloid newspaper News of the World suggested she might be an alien. Shadforth and music critic Paul Morley took the comments on Minogue's looks into consideration, commenting on her as a "creative, experimental artist" by placing her face close to the camera lens in the music video, distorting her face but retaining her glamour.

The video begins with Minogue driving a De Tomaso Mangusta sports car while singing the song. The next scene depicts a number of couples dressed in black and white costumes performing a dance routine; they are soon joined by Minogue, who has wavy light-brown hair and is wearing a white tracksuit. The setting changes to a room where Minogue, now with straight hair and crimson lipstick, and wearing a white jumpsuit with a neckline plunging down to her navel, is striking poses. The outfit was designed by London-based fashion designer Fee Doran under the label Mrs Jones. According to Minogue, the outfit was inspired by fashion designs worn by Jamaican singer and model, Grace Jones. Minogue then performs a synchronised dance routine with several backup dancers, who are wearing red-and-black suits reminiscent of Kraftwerk's Man Machine uniforms. As the video ends, Minogue—again with curly hair and wearing a lavender halter-neck dress with ribbon tile trim, performs a similar routine on top of a building at night.

=== Impact ===
At the 2002 MTV Video Music Awards ceremony, the music video was nominated for Best Dance Video; Rooney won the award for Best Choreography. The hooded white jumpsuit Minogue wore in the music video is often considered to be one of her most iconic looks, particularly because of its deep, plunging neckline. Minogue's stylist William Baker described the choice of the outfit, saying, "it was pure but kind of slutty at the same time". The outfit was put on display at Kylie: The Exhibition, which featured memorabilia and costumes from Minogue's career, which was held at the Victoria and Albert Museum in London, and at the similar Kylie: an Exhibition at the Powerhouse Museum in Sydney. The jumpsuit was also included in Minogue's official fashion photography book Kylie / Fashion, which was released to celebrate her 25 years in music.

The music video served as an inspiration for Morley while writing his book Words and Music: The History of Pop in the Shape of a City. In it, Morley said he "turned the lonely drive [Minogue] made in the song's video towards a city ... into a fictional history of music". University lecturers Diane Railton and Paul Weston, in their 2005 essay "Naughty Girls and Red Blooded Women (Representations of Female Heterosexuality in Music Video)", contrasted the music video of "Can't Get You Out of My Head" with that of Beyoncé's 2003 single "Baby Boy"; while both videos focus on two singers performing seductive dance routines, Minogue is presented in a calculated manner and "is always provisional, restricted, and contingent", whereas Beyoncé displays a particular "primitive, feral, uncontrolled and uncontrollable" sexuality that is embodied in the black female body. Railton and Weston said the videos are representative of the depictions of white and black women in colonial times and pop culture, respectively.

== Live performances ==
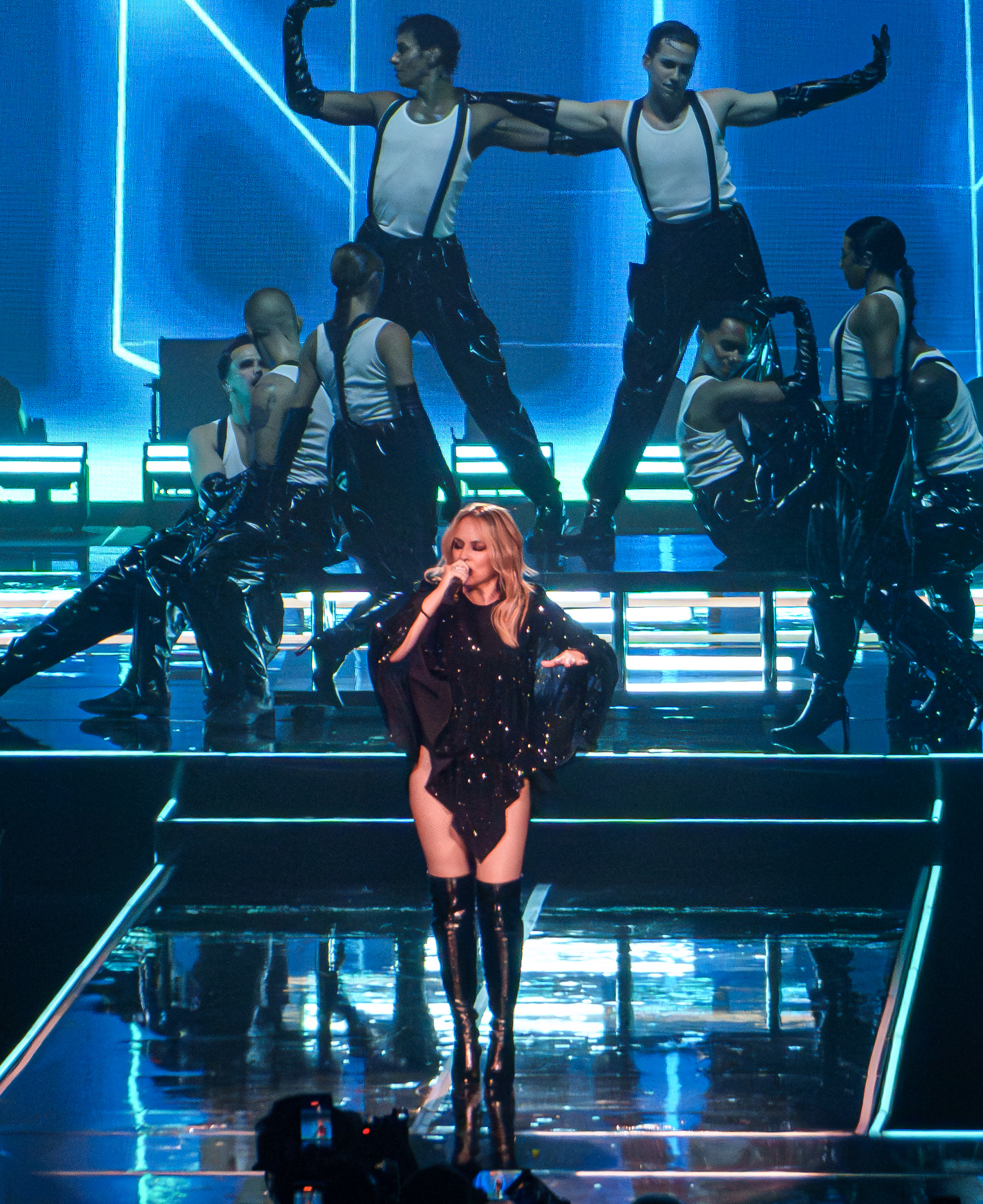
Minogue performing "Can't Get You Out of My Head" during the Tension Tour (2025)

On 2 September 2001, Minogue performed "Can't Get You Out of My Head" at the BBC Radio 1 One Big Sunday show in Leicester, UK. On 8 September 2001, the song was performed at Festivalbar in Verona, Italy, marking the first performance of "Can't Get You Out of My Head" after being officially released as a single. She sang the song on 8 November 2001 at the MTV Europe Music Awards ceremony in Frankfurt and on 11 December 2001 at Radio DeeJay's "Dance Award" in Milan, where Minogue also won for "Artist of the Year", "Song of the Year" and "Best Music Video". At the 2002 Brit Awards held on 20 February 2002, Minogue performed a mash-up version Stuart Crichton remixed of "Can't Get You Out of My Head" and New Order's song "Blue Monday" (1983). The performance was ranked at number 40 on The Guardian's 2011 list of 50 Key Events in the History of Dance Music. The mashup was titled "Can't Get Blue Monday Out of My Head"; it was released as the B-side of "Love at First Sight" and was included on Minogue's remix album Boombox (2008). On 16 March 2002, Minogue performed "Can't Get You Out of My Head" along with "In Your Eyes", on the US television show Saturday Night Live. On 13 December 2002, Minogue performed the song alongside "Come into My World" on Good Morning America.

In 2001, "Can't Get You Out of My Head" was included on the set list of Minogue's "On a Night Like This" tour and the encore segment of the KylieFever2002 tour, which promoted Fever. In 2003, Minogue performed "Can't Get You Out of My Head" at the one-night concert Money Can't Buy at the Hammersmith Apollo in London in support of her ninth studio album Body Language. In 2005, she performed the song on her Showgirl: The Greatest Hits tour and on her Showgirl: The Homecoming tour in 2006–2007. In 2008, she sang "Can't Get You Out of My Head" on the KylieX2008 tour. In 2009, Minogue performed the song on the For You, for Me tour, which was her first concert tour of North America.

A rock-oriented version of the song was performed during the Aphrodite: Les Folies Tour in 2011. The following year, Minogue promoted The Abbey Road Sessions by performing at the BBC Proms in the Park at Hyde Park, London. During the event, she sang the orchestral version of "Can't Get You Out of My Head". She performed the same version of the song on series six of X Factor in Italy on 6 December 2012 and on series nine of The X Factor in the United Kingdom on 8 December 2012. On 7 May 2014, Minogue performed the song on the TV show The Voice of Italy, joined by four contestants, including Sister Cristina. A "slower, darker version" of the song was included on Minogue's Kiss Me Once Tour (2014–2015) set list. She also included "Can't Get You Out of My Head" on the 2015 Royal Albert Hall performance as part of her A Kylie Christmas concert. An acoustic-guitar-driven version of the song was performed on the Golden Tour (2018–2019). In 2019, during her Glastonbury Festival set, Minogue was joined by English singer Chris Martin and they performed "Can't Get You Out of My Head" together.

Minogue performed "Can't Get You Out of My Head" during the season 21 finale of American Idol in a medley with her 2023 single "Padam Padam"; for the former, she was joined by Nutsa, one of the contestants. During the performance, Minogue wore a black high-slit dress and over-the-knee leather boots. On 7 March 2024, Minogue joined Madonna to sing an a cappella version of the song on the North American leg of the Celebration Tour. In 2025, Minogue included "Can't Get You Out of My Head" on the set list of her Tension Tour. In 2025, Minogue performed a rendition of "Can't Get You Out of My Head" with ATEEZ members Seonghwa, Yunho, Wooyoung and Jongho on the TV show KPopped.

== Legacy ==
According to author Lee Barron, "Can't Get You Out of My Head" "further established Minogue's cultural and commercial relevance in the new millennium". He said the song "with its hypnotic 'la la la' refrain and the deceptively uncomplicated, catchily repetitive beats and synth-sound, marked yet another clearly defined image transformation from the camp-infused Light Years to an emphasis upon a cool, machine-like sexuality". Everett True of The Guardian wrote the song continued Kylie's transition from the girl-next-door to "flirtatious, sophisticated persona" that started with the release of "Spinning Around" in 2000. True said the success of "Can't Get You Out of My Head" was one of the motivating factors behind "manufactured" pop music gaining "new postmodern respectability" and marked a "clear shift in attitude towards pop music among the 'serious' rock critic fraternity".

Publications such as The Guardian and Rolling Stone recognise "Can't Get You Out of My Head" as Minogue's signature song. In 2012, the UK agency PRS for Music, which collects royalties on behalf of songwriters and composers, named "Can't Get You Out of My Head" as the most popular song of the decade, receiving the most airplay and live covers in the 2000s decade. In 2025, the song placed 27 in the Triple J Hottest 100 of Australian Songs.

== Formats and track listings ==
- Benelux and French 2-track CD single, European cassette and US 7-inch vinyl
1. "Can't Get You Out of My Head" – 3:50
2. "Boy" – 3:47
- European, UK and Australian CD maxi-single 1
1. "Can't Get You Out of My Head" – 3:50
2. "Boy" – 3:47
3. "Rendezvous at Sunset" – 3:23
4. "Can't Get You Out of My Head" (video) – 3:47
- European and UK CD maxi-single 2
1. "Can't Get You Out of My Head" – 3:50
2. "Can't Get You Out of My Head" (K & M's Mindprint mix) – 6:34
3. "Can't Get You Out of My Head" (Plastika mix) – 9:26
- Australian CD maxi-single 2
1. "Can't Get You Out of My Head" – 3:50
2. "Can't Get You Out of My Head" (K & M's Mindprint mix) – 6:34
3. "Can't Get You Out of My Head" (Plastika mix) – 9:26
4. "Can't Get You Out of My Head" (Superchumbo Todo Mamado mix) – 8:32
- Spanish CD maxi-single (Remixes)
1. "Can't Get You Out of My Head" (K & M's Mindprint mix) – 6:34
2. "Can't Get You Out of My Head" (Nick Faber remix) – 5:59
3. "Can't Get You Out of My Head" (Superchumbo Todo Mamado mix) – 8:32
- European 12-inch vinyl
1. "Can't Get You Out of My Head" – 3:50
2. "Can't Get You Out of My Head" (Plastika mix) – 9:26
3. "Can't Get You Out of My Head" (Deluxe's Dirty dub) – 6:53
4. "Can't Get You Out of My Head" (Superchumbo Leadhead dub) – 7:00
- UK 12-inch double vinyl
1. "Can't Get You Out of My Head" (Deluxe's Dirty dub) – 6:53
2. "Can't Get You Out of My Head" (Deluxe's Dirty dub instrumental) – 6:52
3. "Can't Get You Out of My Head" (Plastika mix) – 9:26
4. "Can't Get You Out of My Head" (Superchumbo Todo Mamado mix) – 8:35
5. "Can't Get You Out of My Head" (K & M's Mindprint mix) – 6:35
- UK limited edition 12-inch vinyl
1. "Can't Get You Out of My Head" (extended version) – 5:57
2. "Can't Get You Out of My Head" (extended instrumental) – 5:57
- UK and European 7-inch vinyl
1. "Can't Get You Out of My Head" – 3:50
2. "Can't Get Blue Monday Out of My Head" – 4:01
- US 12-inch vinyl
1. "Can't Get You Out of My Head" – 3:48
2. "Can't Get You Out of My Head" (K & M's Mindprint mix) – 6:33
3. "Can't Get You Out of My Head" (Nick Faber remix) – 5:58
4. "Can't Get You Out of My Head" (Superchumbo Todo Mamado mix) – 8:31
- Digital download
1. "Can't Get Blue Monday Out of My Head" (live in Manchester) – 4:54
2. "Can't Get You Out of My Head" (extended instrumental) – 6:00
3. "Can't Get You Out of My Head" (extended mix) – 5:59
4. "Can't Get You Out of My Head" (Nick Faber remix) – 6:00
5. "Can't Get You Out of My Head" (Radio Slave remix dub re-edit) – 5:01
6. "Can't Get You Out of My Head" (Radio Slave vocal re-edit) – 10:25
7. "Can't Get You Out of My Head" (Superchumbo Leadhead dub) – 7:05
8. "Can't Get You Out of My Head" (Superchumbo Todo Mamado mix) – 8:34
9. "Can't Get You Out of My Head" (Superchumbo Voltapella mix) – 1:58
- Digital download (Peggy Gou's Midnight Remix)
1. "Can't Get You Out of My Head" (Peggy Gou's Midnight remix) – 4:31

== Charts ==
=== Weekly charts ===
Weekly chart performance
Chart (2001–2002)	Peak position
Australia (ARIA)	1
Australian Club (ARIA)	2
Australian Dance (ARIA)	1
Austria (Ö3 Austria Top 40)	1
Belgium (Ultratop 50 Flanders)	1
Belgium (Ultratop 50 Wallonia)	1
Canada Radio (Nielsen BDS)	2
Canada AC (Nielsen BDS)	17
Canada CHR/Top 40 (Nielsen BDS)	1
Croatia International Airplay (HRT)	1
Denmark (Tracklisten)	1
Denmark Airplay (Tracklisten)	1
Europe (Eurochart Hot 100)	1
Finland (Suomen virallinen lista)	5
France (SNEP)	1
Germany (GfK)	1
Greece (IFPI Greece)	1
Hungary (Mahasz)	1
Ireland (IRMA)	1
Italy (FIMI)	1
Netherlands (Dutch Top 40)	1
Netherlands (Single Top 100)	1
New Zealand (Recorded Music NZ)	1
Norway (VG-lista)	1
Poland (Polish Singles Chart)	1
Quebec (ADISQ)	2
Portugal (Billboard)	1
Romania (Romanian Top 100)	1
Russia Airplay (Music & Media)	1
Scottish Singles Sales (Official Charts)	1
South Africa (RISA)	2
Spain (Promusicae)	1
Sweden (Sverigetopplistan)	1
Switzerland (Schweizer Hitparade)	1
UK Singles (Official Charts)	1
US Billboard Hot 100	7
US Adult Pop Airplay (Billboard)	23
US Dance Club Songs (Billboard)	1
US Dance Airplay (Billboard)	32
US Pop Airplay (Billboard)	3
US Rhythmic Airplay (Billboard)	9

Chart (2024)	Peak position
UK Dance (Official Charts)	24

Chart (2026)	Peak position
Global 200 (Billboard)	176
Greece International (IFPI)	45
Lithuania (AGATA)	22

==== Peggy Gou's Midnight Remix ====
Chart (2023)	Peak position
Greece International (IFPI)	85

=== Year-end charts ===
Year-end chart performance
Chart (2001)	Position
Australia (ARIA)	3
Australian Club Chart (ARIA)	27
Australian Dance Chart (ARIA)	1
Austria (Ö3 Austria Top 40)	1
Belgium (Ultratop 50 Flanders)	8
Belgium (Ultratop 50 Wallonia)	7
Europe (Eurochart Hot 100)	2
France (SNEP)	8
Germany (Media Control)	4
Ireland (IRMA)	7
Italy (FIMI)	1
Netherlands (Dutch Top 40)	5
Netherlands (Single Top 100)	2
New Zealand (RIANZ)	45
Romania (Romanian Top 100)	1
Spain (AFYVE)	3
Sweden (Hitlistan)	4
Switzerland (Schweizer Hitparade)	1
UK Singles (OCC)	3

Year-end chart performance
Chart (2002)	Position
Austria (Ö3 Austria Top 40)	50
Brazil (Crowley)	7
Canada Radio (Nielsen BDS)	15
Europe (Eurochart Hot 100)	11
France (SNEP)	36
Switzerland (Schweizer Hitparade)	26
US Billboard Hot 100	45
US Adult Top 40 (Billboard)	78
US Dance Club Play (Billboard)	40
US Mainstream Top 40 (Billboard)	24
US Rhythmic Top 40 (Billboard)	52

Year-end chart performance
Chart (2023)	Position
Australia (ARIA Top 50 Australian Singles)	47

Year-end chart performance
Chart (2024)	Position
Kazakhstan Airplay (TopHit)	191

Year-end chart performance
Chart (2025)	Position
Argentina Anglo Airplay (Monitor Latino)	84

=== Decade-end charts ===
Decade-end chart performance
Chart (2000–2009)	Position
Australia (ARIA)	58
Austria (Ö3 Austria Top 40)	4
Germany (Media Control GfK)	67
Netherlands (Single Top 100)	15
UK Singles (OCC)	7

== Certifications ==
Certifications and sales for "Can't Get You Out of My Head"
Region	Certification	Certified units/sales
Australia (ARIA)	3× Platinum	210,000^{^}
Austria (IFPI Austria)	Platinum	40,000^{*}
Belgium (BRMA)	2× Platinum	100,000^{*}
Denmark (IFPI Danmark)	Platinum	90,000^{‡}
France (SNEP)	Platinum	542,000
Germany (BVMI)	Platinum	500,000^{^}
Greece (IFPI Greece)	Platinum	20,000^{^}
Italy (FIMI) 2001–2002	2× Platinum	130,000
Italy (FIMI) since 2009	Platinum	100,000^{‡}
Netherlands (NVPI)	Platinum	60,000^{^}
New Zealand (RMNZ)	3× Platinum	90,000^{‡}
Norway (IFPI Norway)	Platinum	10,000^{*}
South Africa (RISA)	Platinum	50,000
Spain (Promusicae)	Gold	30,000^{‡}
Sweden (GLF)	Platinum	30,000^{^}
Switzerland (IFPI Switzerland)	Platinum	40,000^{^}
United Kingdom (BPI)	3× Platinum	1,800,000^{‡}
United States (RIAA)	Gold	531,000
Streaming
Greece (IFPI Greece)	Platinum	2,000,000^{†}
Summaries
Worldwide	—	5,000,000
^{*} Sales figures based on certification alone.^{^} Shipments figures based on certification alone.^{‡} Sales+streaming figures based on certification alone.^{†} Streaming-only figures based on certification alone.

== Release history ==
Release dates and formats for "Can't Get You Out of My Head"
Region	Date	Format(s)	Label(s)	Ref.
Australia	8 September 2001	Maxi CD (Note: In Australia and Europe, "Can't Get You Out of My Head" was made available in two maxi CD variants, with one including remixes alongside the original version, and the other including two B-sides and the song's music video.)	Festival Mushroom	
Germany	17 September 2001	Maxi CD	EMI	
United Kingdom	17 September 2001	12-inch vinyl; cassette; maxi CD	Parlophone	
France	20 September 2001	12-inch vinyl	Parlophone	
New Zealand	22 October 2001	Maxi CD	Festival Mushroom	
France	25 October 2001	CD	Parlophone	
United States	8 January 2002	12-inch vinyl	Capitol	
United States	21 January 2002	Contemporary hit radio	Capitol	
Various	19 May 2022	Digital download; streaming (Peggy Gou's Midnight Remix)	Parlophone	

== See also ==
- List of number-one singles of 2001 (Australia)
- List of number-one hits of 2001 (Austria)
- Ultratop 50 number-one hits of 2001
- Ultratop 40 number-one hits of 2001
- List of number-one songs of the 2000s (Denmark)
- List of European number-one hits of 2001
- List of number-one singles of 2001 (France)
- List of number-one hits of 2001 (Germany)
- List of number-one singles of 2001 (Ireland)
- List of number-one hits of 2001 (Italy)
- List of Dutch Top 40 number-one singles of 2001
- List of number-one singles from the 2000s (New Zealand)
- List of number-one songs in Norway
- List of number-one singles of 2001 (Spain)
- List of number-one singles of the 2000s (Sweden)
- List of number-one singles of the 2000s (Switzerland)
- List of UK Singles Chart number ones of the 2000s
- List of number-one dance singles of 2002 (U.S.)
