= L5 (group) =

French girl group

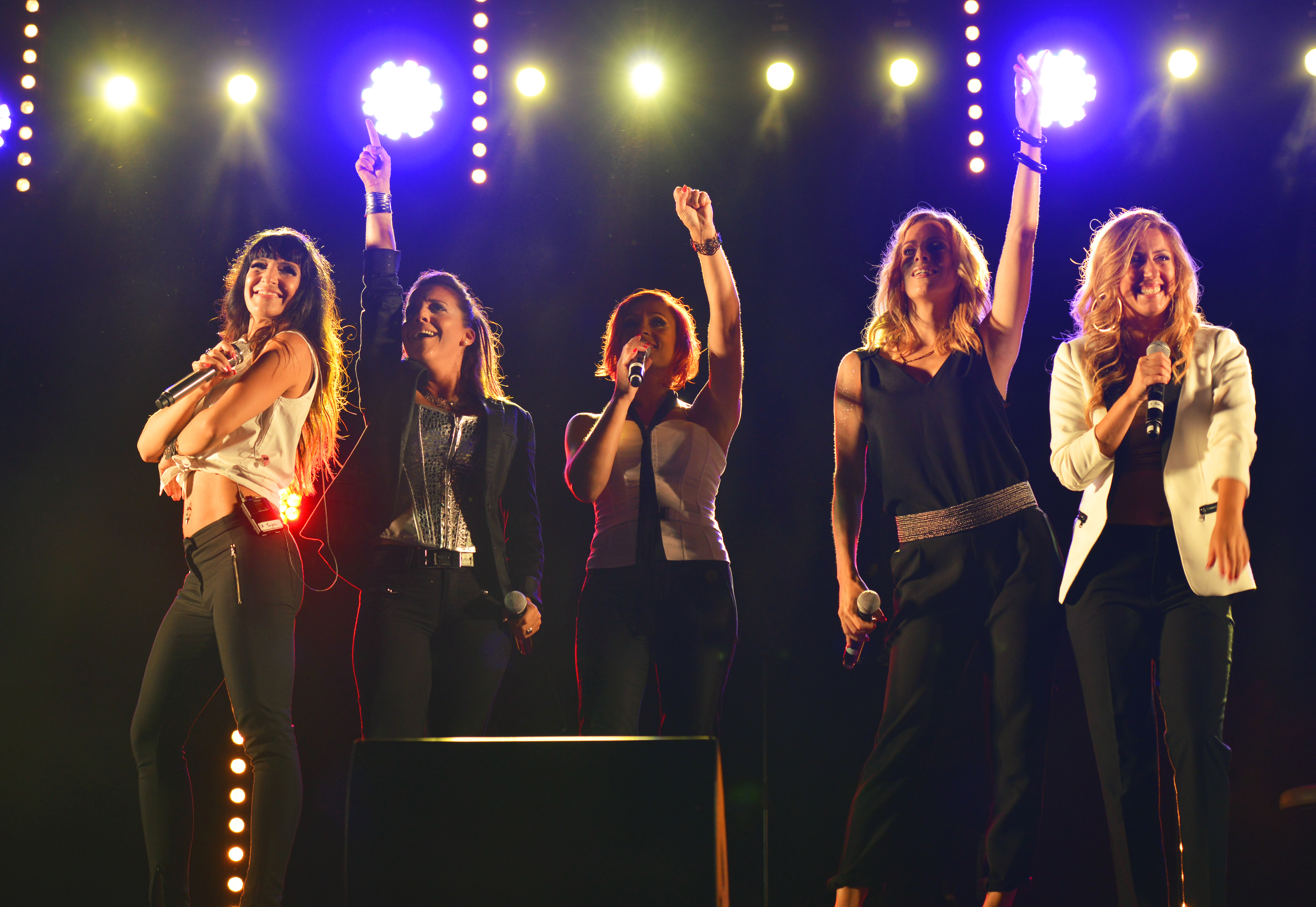
- L5 in a 2015 concert

Background information
- Origin: France
- Genres: Pop, dance-pop, teen-pop
- Years active: 2001-2006
- Labels: Mercury Records
- Past members: Alex Dana; Claire L. Coralie Gelle (Coraly Emoi); Louisy Joseph; Margie Nelson

L5 was a French girl group. They were known for their participation in the French Popstars TV programme in its first season in 2001. L5 reached the 54th position in the list of French best-selling singles and held the number 1 position in the list of French number-one hits of 2001 with their song "Toutes les femmes de ta vie". They toured in France with Jérémy Chatelain in 2003 and with Billy Crawford in 2006. "Make a Change", on the album Destiny by No Angels, is an English-language remake of L5's single "Reste Encore" (2003).

== Members ==
- Alexandra Canto (Alex Dana), born on 26 June 1978 in Marseille
- Claire Litvine (Claire L.), born on 4 April 1972 in Pau
- Coralie Gelle (Coraly Emoi), born on 7 October 1977 in Bressuire
- Louisy Joseph, born on 14 April 1978 in Lyon
- Marjorie Parascandola (Margie Nelson), born on 8 October 1980 in Pierrelatte

== Discography ==
=== Albums ===
Title	Album details	Peak chart positions		Certifications
Title	Album details	FRA	SWI	Certifications
L5	Studio album; Released: December 15, 2001; Label: Mercury	1	3	SNEP: 2× Platinum
Retiens-moi	Studio album; Released: September 29, 2002; Label: Mercury	1	14	SNEP: Platinum
Le live	Live album; Released: February 13, 2004; Label: Mercury	32	—	
Turbulences	Studio album; Released: January 23, 2005; Label: Mercury	8	80	
Best Of	Compilation album; Released: November 27, 2006; Label: Mercury	—	—	

=== Singles ===
Title	Year	Peak chart positions			Certifications	Album
Title	Year	FRA	BEL (WA)	SWI	Certifications	Album
"Toutes les femmes de ta vie"	2001	1	17	11	SNEP: Diamond	L5
"Une étincelle"	2002	7	—	—		L5
"Question de survie (de l'air!)"	2002	34	—	—		L5
"Aime"	2002	13	—	24	SNEP: Gold	Retiens-moi
"Retiens-moi"	2002	20	—	59		Retiens-moi
"Maniac"	2003	9	—	32		Retiens-moi
"Reste encore"	2003	56	—	—		Retiens-moi
"À ta liberté"	2005	31	—	—		Turbulences

=== DVDs ===
- 2002 - Comment Devenir Popstars (L'historie Vraie du Groupe)
- 2004 – Le Live
