= Rhythm and Blues (Garou album) =

Studio album by Garou
- Released: 24 September 2012
- Studio: The Sanctuary
- Genre: Rhythm and blues
- Label: Columbia
- Producer: SMV

Garou chronology
| Version intégrale (2010) | Rhythm and Blues (2012) | Au milieu de ma vie (2013) |

Rhythm and Blues is the seventh studio album by Canadian singer Garou, and his eighth album overall. It was recorded in London at The Sanctuary recording studios by producers "SMV" and is a bilingual French / English dedicated to the spirit of R&B including covers of famous tracks The album contains 6 songs in French and 6 in English.

== Track listing ==
| No. | Title | Original artist | Length |
|---|---|---|---|
| 1. | "Quand tu danses" | Gilbert Bécaud | 2:57 |
| 2. | "Little Green Bag" | George Baker Selection | 3:28 |
| 3. | "Le jour se lève" | Esther Galil | 3:20 |
| 4. | "Marie-Jeanne" | Joe Dassin | 4:32 |
| 5. | "I Put a Spell on You" | Jay Hawkins | 3:11 |
| 6. | "Hard to Handle" | Otis Redding | 3:29 |
| 7. | "If I Ain't Got You" | Alicia Keys | 3:53 |
| 8. | "Lonely Boy" | The Black Keys | 3:24 |
| 9. | "Cash City" | Luc de Larochellière | 4:50 |
| 10. | "Sur la route" | Gérald De Palmas | 3:20 |
| 11. | "Bad Day" | Daniel Powter | 3:36 |
| 12. | "Je voudrais voir New-York" | Daniel Lavoie | 4:45 |
| Total length: | | | 44:45 |

== Charts ==
=== Weekly charts ===
| Chart (2012) | Peak position |
|---|---|
| Belgian Albums (Ultratop Flanders) | 154 |
| Belgian Albums (Ultratop Wallonia) | 2 |
| French Albums (SNEP) | 2 |
| Swiss Albums (Schweizer Hitparade) | 18 |

=== Year-end charts ===
| Chart (2012) | Position |
|---|---|
| Belgian Albums (Ultratop Wallonia) | 20 |
| French Albums (SNEP) | 31 |

| Chart (2013) | Position |
|---|---|
| Belgian Albums (Ultratop Wallonia) | 103 |
| French Albums (SNEP) | 116 |
