= Andrea Lindsay =

Canadian pop singer-songwriter

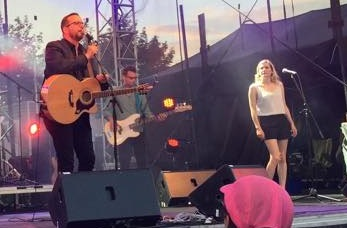

Background information
- Born: 18 November 1976 (age 49); Guelph, Ontario, Canada
- Genres: Pop
- Occupations: Musician, singer-songwriter
- Instruments: guitar
- Years active: 2003–present

Andrea Lindsay is a Canadian pop singer-songwriter, who won the Juno Award for Francophone Album of the Year at the Juno Awards of 2010 for her album Les Sentinelles dorment.

Born on 18 november 1976 in Guelph, Ontario, Lindsay was raised as an anglophone, but learned French as an adult after visiting France at age 18. Later settling in Montreal, Quebec, she formed the band Tuesday 5 with Jennifer Bacchet, releasing the English language album Here and Now in 2003. Her subsequent albums as a solo artist have all been in French. In 2011, she also participated as a supporting musician in a reunion tour by the Franco-Ontarian rock band CANO.

She is married to musician Luc de Larochellière. In 2012, they released the album C'est d'l'amour ou c'est comme as a duo.

== Discography ==
- Here and Now (2003, with Tuesday 5)
- La Belle Étoile (2006)
- Les Sentinelles dorment (2009)
- C'est d'l'amour ou c'est comme (2012, with Luc de Larochellière)
- Le Jazz et la Java (2016)
- S'il n'y avait que nous (2019, with Luc de Larochellière)
- D'or et d'argent (2025) November 28, 2025
