= Toutes les femmes de ta vie =

Single by L5

from the album L5
- B-side: "Où sont passés les hommes ?"
- Released: November 19, 2001
- Recorded: 2001; ICP Studios, Brussels
- Genre: Europop, dance-pop
- Length: 3:15
- Label: Mercury, Universal Music
- Songwriters: Johan Åberg; Sigurd Rosnes; Billy Steinberg; Doriand (adaptation); Maïdi Roth (adaptation)
- Producer: Maxim Nucci

L5 singles chronology
"Toutes les femmes de ta vie" (2001)	"Une Étincelle" (2002)

"Toutes les femmes de ta vie" (English: "All the women in your life") is a 2001 song recorded by French girl group L5. It was their debut single released on November 26, 2001, from its first album L5 on which it features as first track. The song was also included on the band's 2004 album live Le live. It was a huge success in France where it was a number-one hit and can be considered as L5's signature song.

The song was produced by Maxim Nucci, Jenifer Bartoli's boyfriend at the time. "Toutes les femmes de ta vie" was inspired by a Britney Spears' song and was originally composed for Ophélie Winter. This woman anthem had several writers, including Doriand who recorded "Au Diable le Paradis" in 1994. "Toutes les femmes de ta vie" became the seventh best-selling single of the 21st century in France, with 825,000 units sold. and was part of many French compilations such as Barbie la compilation, Star of the TV, Just Girls and Hits de diamant. The song was also included on L5's 2006 best of.

It was band's sole charting single in Belgium (Wallonia).

== Track listings ==
CD single
12" single

1. "Toutes les femmes de ta vie" — 3:15
2. "Où sont passés les hommes ?" (Doriand/Régis Ducatillon/Jérémy Olivier) — 2:58

Digital download

1. "Toutes les femmes de ta vie" — 3:15
2. "Toutes les femmes de ta vie" (live) — 3:40

== Personnel ==
- Maxim Nucci - backing vocals, bass guitar, guitar & keyboards
- Phil Delire - programming
- Yannic Fonderie - programming
- Laurent Darmon - photography
- ★ Bronx - artwork

== Production ==
- Produced by Maxim Nucci
- Engineered & mixed by Djoum at ICP Studios, Brussels
- Mastered by Pompon Finkelstein at Translab, Paris

== Charts ==
=== Weekly charts ===
Chart (2001–2002)	Peak position
Belgian (Wallonia) Singles Chart	17
French SNEP Singles Chart	1
Swiss Singles Chart	11

=== Year-end charts ===
Chart (2001)	Position
French Singles Chart	2
Chart (2002)	Position
Europe (Eurochart Hot 100)	55
French Singles Chart	48

== Certifications and sales ==
Certifications for "Toutes les femmes de ta vie"
Region	Certification	Certified units/sales
France (SNEP)	Diamond	750,000^{*}
^{*} Sales figures based on certification alone.
