= Garou (album) =

Studio album by Garou
- Released: 3 July 2006
- Genre: Pop
- Labels: Sony BMG, Columbia

Garou chronology
Reviens (2003)	Garou (2006)	Piece of My Soul (2008)

Singles from Garou
- 1. "L'injustice" Released: 2006; 2. "Je suis le même" Released: 2006; 3. "Plus fort que moi" Released: 2006; 4. "Que le temps" Released: 2006

Professional ratings
Review scores
Source	Rating
Allmusic	link

Garou is the third studio album by Canadian singer Garou, and his fourth album overall.

== Track listing ==
1. "Le temps nous aime" (Jacques Veneruso) – 3:26
2. "Je suis le même" (Tino Izzo, Diane Cadieux) – 3:29
3. "Plus fort que moi" (Frédéric Doll, David Gategno) – 3:01
4. "L'Injustice" (Pascal Obispo) – 5:17
5. "Que le temps" (Sandrine Roy, Sylvain Michel) – 3:58
6. "Même par amour" (Patrice Guirao, Pascal Obispo) – 3:24
7. "Dis que tu me retiendras" (Diane Cadieux, Tino Izzo) – 3:37
8. "Trahison" (Aldo Nova, Johan Bobäck, Joachim Nilsson, Luc Plamondon) – 3:58
9. "Milliers de pixels" (Tino Izzo, Diane Cadieux) – 3:33
10. "Je suis debout" (Jacques Veneruso) – 3:26
11. "Viens me chercher" (Jean-Jacques Goldman, Jacques Veneruso) – 3:32
12. "Quand je manque de toi" (Jacques Veneruso) – 3:29

== Certifications ==
Region	Certification	Certified units/sales
France (SNEP)	Platinum	200,000^{*}
Russia (NFPF)	Gold	10,000^{*}
Switzerland (IFPI Switzerland)	Gold	15,000^{^}
^{*} Sales figures based on certification alone.^{^} Shipments figures based on certification alone.
