= Reviens =

Studio album by Garou
- Released: 10 May 2003
- Studios: Studio Batou-Lune, Bateau-Soleil, Studio Guillame Tell, Pulse Recording Studios, Studios Forum Village, Romus Studio
- Genre: Pop
- Labels: Sony Music, Columbia
- Producers: Erick Benzi (tracks 1, 3, 5, 7-9, 12-16), Jacques Veneruso (tracks 1, 5 and 12), Gerald De Palmas (track 2), Aldo Nova (tracks 4 and 6), Vito Luprano (tracks 4 and 6; also executive producer), Romano Musumarra (tracks 10 and 11), Valerio Calisse (tracks 10 and 11)

Garou chronology
Seul... avec vous (2001)	Reviens (2003)	Garou (2006)

Singles from Reviens
- 1. "Reviens (Où te caches-tu?)" Released: December 2003; 2. "Et si on dormait" Released: April 2004; 3. "La Rivière de notre enfance" Released: 14 November 2004

Professional ratings
Review scores
Source	Rating
Allmusic	4/5 stars

Reviens is the second studio album by Canadian singer Garou, and his third album overall. Released in May 2003, this album was a great success in many countries, including France, Belgium, Switzerland and Poland where it reached the top five.

In May 2004 Reviens was reissued with bonus track "La Rivière de notre enfance".

== Track listing ==
=== Original release ===
1. "Passe ta route" (Jacques Veneruso) – 2:56
2. "Et si on dormait" (Gérald De Palmas) – 3:40
3. "Hemingway" (Didier Barbelivien) – 4:16
4. "L'Aveu" (Sophie Nault, Claude Pineault) – 3:52
5. "Reviens (Où te caches-tu?)" (Jacques Veneruso) – 3:12
6. "Pour l'amour d'une femme" (Luc Plamondon, Aldo Nova, Ago Jeremy-Michael De Paul) – 3:59
7. "Pendant que mes cheveux poussent" (Erick Benzi) – 2:17
8. "Les Filles" (Jean-Jacques Goldman) – 3:08
9. "Le Sucre et le Sel" (Featuring Annie & Suzie Villeneuve) (Erick Benzi) – 3:54
10. "Quand passe la passion" (Romano Musumarra, Luc Plamondon) – 3:55
11. "Au cœur de la terre" (Romano Musumarra, Luc Plamondon) – 3:38
12. "Prière indienne" (Jacques Veneruso) – 3:57
13. "Tout cet amour-là" (Jean-Jacques Goldman) – 4:34
14. "Ne me parlez plus d'elle" (Eric Lapointe, Roger Tabra, Stéphane Dufour) – 3:44
15. "Ton premier regard" (Gildas Arzel) – 4:32
16. "Une dernière fois encore" (featuring Gildas Arzel) (Gildas Arzel) – 6:22

=== Reissue ===
1. "Passe ta route" (Jacques Veneruso) – 2:56
2. "Et si on dormait" (Gérald De Palmas) – 3:40
3. "Hemingway" (Didier Barbelivien) – 4:16
4. "L'Aveu" (Sophie Nault, Claude Pineault) – 3:52
5. "Reviens (Où te caches-tu?)" (Jacques Veneruso) – 3:12
6. "Pour l'amour d'une femme" (Luc Plamondon, Aldo Nova, Ago Jeremy-Michael De Paul) – 3:59
7. "Pendant que mes cheveux poussent" (Erick Benzi) – 2:17
8. "Les Filles" (Jean-Jacques Goldman) – 3:08
9. "Le Sucre et le Sel" (Featuring Annie & Suzie Villeneuve) (Erick Benzi) – 3:54
10. "Quand passe la passion" (Romano Musumarra, Luc Plamondon) – 3:55
11. "Au cœur de la terre" (Romano Musumarra, Luc Plamondon) – 3:38
12. "Prière indienne" (Jacques Veneruso) – 3:57
13. "Tout cet amour-là" (Jean-Jacques Goldman) – 4:34
14. "Ne me parlez plus d'elle" (Eric Lapointe, Roger Tabra, Stéphane Dufour) – 3:44
15. "Ton premier regard" (Gildas Arzel) – 4:32
16. "Une dernière fois encore" (Featuring Gildas Arzel) (Gildas Arzel) – 6:22
17. "La Rivière de notre enfance" (Duo avec Michel Sardou)

== Certifications ==
Country	Certification	Date	Sales certified	Physical sales
Belgium	Gold	20 December 2003	20,000	
France	Platinum	2003	300,000	582,200
Poland	Gold	7 December 2003	50 000	
Switzerland	Platinum	2004	40,000	

== Charts ==
Chart (2000–2002)	Peak position
Belgian (Wallonia) Albums Chart	1
French Albums Chart	3
Polish Albums Chart	2
Swiss Albums Chart	5

End of year chart (2003)	Position
Belgian (Wallonia) Albums Chart	78
French Albums Chart	33
End of year chart (2004)	Position
Belgian (Wallonia) Albums Chart	31
French Albums Chart	21
Swiss Albums Chart	66
End of year chart (2005)	Position
French Albums Chart	126
