= Sous le vent =

Single by Garou and Celine Dion

from the album Seul
- Language: French
- B-side: "Au plaisir de ton corps"
- Released: 29 October 2001
- Recorded: 2000
- Studio: Bateau-Lune (Paris); Piccolo (Montreal); The Hit Factory (New York)
- Genre: Pop
- Length: 3:30
- Label: Columbia
- Songwriter: Jacques Veneruso
- Producers: Erick Benzi; Humberto Gatica; Aldo Nova

Garou singles chronology
"Je n'attendais que vous" (2001)	"Sous le vent" (2001)	"Le monde est stone" (2002)

Celine Dion singles chronology
"I Want You to Need Me" (2000)	"Sous le vent" (2001)	"A New Day Has Come" (2002)

Music video
- "Sous le vent" on YouTube

"Sous le vent" (lit. 'Under the wind') is a song by Canadian singers Garou and Celine Dion from Garou's debut album, Seul (2000). It was written by Jacques Veneruso and produced by Erick Benzi, with additional production by Humberto Gatica and Aldo Nova. "Sous le vent" was released as the album's third single on 29 October 2001. The song was successful in Francophone countries, reaching number one in France, Belgium's Wallonia, and Quebec, and number two in Switzerland. It was certified diamond in France and platinum in Belgium and Switzerland. In 2005, "Sous le vent" was included on Dion's greatest hits album, On ne change pas.

== Background and release ==
Garou's debut album, Seul, was released in November 2000 and became successful in Francophone countries. It included a duet with Celine Dion, "Sous le vent". The song was written by Jacques Veneruso and produced by Erick Benzi, with additional production by Humberto Gatica and Aldo Nova. "Sous le vent" was selected as the album's third single and released on 29 October 2001. In 2005, it was included on Dion's greatest hits album, On ne change pas.

== Accolades ==
In France, "Sous le vent" won a Victoires de la Musique award for Original Song of the Year and received the NRJ Music Award for Francophone Duo/Group of the Year. In Quebec, it was nominated for two Félix Awards for Most Popular Song of the Year and Video of the Year.

== Commercial performance ==
"Sous le vent" entered the airplay chart in Quebec on 20 October 2001 and stayed at number one for three weeks. It also peaked at number 14 on the Canadian Singles Chart, becoming Garou's and Dion's first French-language song to appear on it. In France, "Sous le vent" debuted at number one and remained there for three consecutive weeks. It was certified diamond by the SNEP. The song also reached number one in Belgium's Wallonia, where it was certified platinum. In Switzerland, it reached number two and received platinum certification. "Sous le vent" also reached number six on the European Hot 100 Singles chart and on the airplay chart in Poland.

== Music video ==
The music video for "Sous le vent" was filmed on 9 August 2001 and directed by Istan Rozumny. It was released on 5 September 2001. In 2005, it was included on Dion's greatest hits DVD collection, On ne change pas. An earlier video, showing Dion and Garou in the recording studio, was filmed in 2000.

== Formats and track listing ==
- French CD single
1. "Sous le vent" – 3:30
2. "Au plaisir de ton corps" – 4:38
- French CD maxi-single
1. "Sous le vent" – 3:30
2. "Au plaisir de ton corps" – 4:38
3. "Sous le vent" (music video) – 3:47

== Charts ==
=== Weekly charts ===
Weekly chart performance
Chart (2001–2002)	Peak position
Belgium (Ultratop Airplay Flanders)	80
Belgium (Ultratop 50 Wallonia)	1
Canada (Nielsen SoundScan)	14
European Hot 100 Singles (Music & Media)	6
France (SNEP)	1
Netherlands (Single Top 100)	78
Poland (National Airplay)	6
Quebec (BDS Radio)	1
Switzerland (Schweizer Hitparade)	2

=== Year-end charts ===
2001 year-end chart performance
Chart (2001)	Position
Belgium (Ultratop 50 Wallonia)	19
Belgium Francophone (Ultratop 50 Wallonia)	10
France (SNEP)	10
Switzerland (Schweizer Hitparade)	70

2002 year-end chart performance
Chart (2002)	Position
Belgium (Ultratop 50 Wallonia)	29
Belgium Francophone (Ultratop 50 Wallonia)	17
Canada (Nielsen SoundScan)	179
European Hot 100 Singles (Music & Media)	64
Switzerland (Schweizer Hitparade)	12

== Certifications ==
Certifications
Region	Certification	Certified units/sales
Belgium (BRMA)	Platinum	50,000^{*}
France (SNEP)	Diamond	750,000^{*}
Switzerland (IFPI Switzerland)	Platinum	40,000^{^}
^{*} Sales figures based on certification alone.^{^} Shipments figures based on certification alone.

== Release history ==
Release history
Region	Date	Format	Label	Ref.
France	29 October 2001	CD	Columbia	

== See also ==
- French Top 100 singles of the 2000s
- List of number-one singles of 2001 (France)
- List of Ultratop 40 number-one singles of 2002
