= J-five =

American singer

Jonathan Kovacs (1982, Los Angeles), known as J-five, is an American singer.

== Biography ==
Jonathan was born in 1982 in Los Angeles. He started his singing career in early 2004 with the song "Modern Times", which was a tribute to Charlie Chaplin. The song had success in a few European countries, peaking at number one in France and reaching silver status. That year he also released his first album, Sweet Little Nothing, which mixes rock, rap, funk, jazz and folk sounds.

His father and mother, from France and Austria respectively, introduced him to groups such as The Beatles, Led Zeppelin, and The Rolling Stones, which would later prove very influential to his music. He attended North Hollywood High School. He has three sisters.

== Discography ==
=== Albums ===
- Summer (2004) – US only; credited to Johnny Five
- Sweet Little Nothing (2005) – Europe, Australia, Japan and Russia only. No. 102 in France

=== Singles ===
- "Modern Times" J-Five (2004) – No. 1 in France (silver), No. 9 in Belgium Wallonia, No. 12 in Italy, No. 15 in Switzerland
- "Find a Way" (2004) – # 24 in France, No. 42 in Belgium Wallonia, No. 13 in Italy, No. 70 in Switzerland
