= Au milieu de ma vie =

Studio album by Garou
- Released: 18 November 2013
- Genre: Pop
- Label: Mercury Records

Garou chronology
Rhythm and Blues (2012)	Au milieu de ma vie (2013)	It's Magic (2014)

Au milieu de ma vie is the eighth studio album by Canadian singer Garou, and his ninth album overall. The songs, all in French, are written by Gérald de Palmas, Pascal Obispo, Jean-Jacques Goldman, Francis Cabrel en Luc Plamondon. Garou sings Du vent, du mots in a duet with Charlotte Cardin. The album was produced by the London producers SMV (Sanctuary Music Vault).

== Track listing ==
1. "Au milieu de ma vie" – 3:11
2. "Avancer" – 4:07
3. "Toutes mes erreurs" – 2:58
4. "La Fêlure" – 3:34
5. "Je lui pardonne" – 3:54
6. "Du vent, des mots" – 3:15
7. "L'Ange gardien" – 3:13
8. "Le Blues dans le sang" – 4:13
9. "Avec elle" – 3:35
10. "Seule une femme" – 4:05
11. "Tu sais" – 3:24
