= Un enfant de toi =

1987 single by Phil Barney

"Un Enfant de toi"

Single by Phil Barney

from the album Recto-verseau
- B-side: "Ma Vie c'est la musique" (original version); Instrumental (duet version)
- Released: 1987; 4 June 2002 (duet version)
- Recorded: France
- Genre: Pop
- Length: 3:46 (original version); 4:05 (duet version)
- Label: Zone (original version); M6 (duet version)
- Songwriter(s): Pierre Zito, Phil Barney
- Producer(s): Pierre Zito; Phil Barney; J.P. Daine

Phil Barney singles chronology
"Un Enfant de toi" (1987)	"Avec qui tu vis" (1988)
"Loin de tes bras" (1992)	"Un Enfant de toi" (2002)

Alternative cover
- 2002 release, with Marlène Duval

"Un Enfant de toi" is a 1987 pop song recorded by the French singer Phil Barney. It was released as a single twice : first in 1987 from the album Recto-verseau, then as a duet with Marlène Duval in 2002. Both versions were hits, reaching the top three on the French Singles Chart, and the cover version being more successful than the original.

== Background ==
"Un Enfant de toi" was written and the music composed by Pierre Zito and Phil Barney.

With a romantic melody, the song deals with the story of a man whose wife is pregnant. However, the delivery takes place badly and the woman dies by giving birth to a boy, named Jason. The father, who addresses directly his deceased wife in the song, tells ten years later how he brought up their son.

In 2002, Marlène Duval, a contestant of the French TV reality show Loft Story 2, regularly sang the song when she participated in the show. Therefore, when she came out the loft, Barney proposed her to recording the song in a duet version. She accepted and the song was released as a single. The two singers started a tour to promote the song.

== Chart performances ==
In France, the original version charted for 23 weeks in the top 50, from 5 September 1987 to 6 February 1988. It debuted at the bottom of the chart and eventually reached a peak of number three in its 10th and 15th weeks. It remained in the top ten for ten consecutive weeks. The single earned a Gold disc awarded by the Syndicat National de l'Édition Phonographique.

The duet version entered the French Singles Chart at number 70 on 1 June 2002, although being officially released three days later (several stores sold it before the official date). It directly climbed to number two, topped the chart for three consecutive weeks, then dropped on the chart, totalling seven weeks in the top ten, 16 weeks in the top 50 and 21 weeks on the chart (top 100). About one month after its release, it was certified Platinum disc and ranked at 12 on the year-end. As of July 2014, it is the 89th best-selling single of the 21st century in France, with 321,000 units sold.

On 29 June 2002, the single started at number 20 on the Belgian (Wallonia) Ultratop 40, then jumped straight to number one. It stayed there for four weeks, then kept on dropping and fell off the chart after 14 weeks. It was the 13th best-selling single of 2002.

== Track listings ==
1987 version

7" single

1. "Un Enfant de toi" – 3:46
2. "Ma Vie c'est la musique" – 4:12

2002 version

CD single

1. "Un Enfant de toi" by Phil Barney and Marlène Duval – 4:05
2. "Un Enfant de toi (instrumental) – 4:05

== Charts ==
=== Peak positions ===
Chart (1987)	Peak position
Eurochart Hot 100	28
French SNEP Singles Chart	3
Chart (2002)	Peak position
Belgian (Wallonia) Singles Chart	1
French SNEP Singles Chart	1

=== Year-end charts ===
Chart (2002)	Position
Belgian (Wallonia) Singles Chart	13
Europe (Eurochart Hot 100)	92
French Singles Chart	12

=== Certifications ===
Region	Certification	Certified units/sales
France (SNEP) 1987 solo version	Gold	500,000^{*}
France (SNEP) 2002 Duet version	Platinum	500,000^{*}
^{*} Sales figures based on certification alone.
