= Gentleman cambrioleur =

Studio album by Garou
- Released: 4 December 2009
- Genre: Pop
- Length: 46:32
- Labels: Sony Music, Columbia

Garou chronology
Piece of My Soul (2008)	Gentleman cambrioleur (2009)	Version intégrale (2010)

Gentleman cambrioleur is the fifth studio album by Canadian singer Garou, and his sixth album overall. This is Garou's first cover album, covering songs from artists such as Jacques Dutronc. The title refers to fictional character Arsène Lupin, who was often referred to as a gentleman cambrioleur ('gentleman burglar').

== Track listing ==
1. "Gentleman cambrioleur" – 2:28 (Yves Dessca, Jean-Pierre Bourtayre, Alain Boublil)
2. "I Love Paris" – 2:33 (Cole Porter)
3. "Les Dessous chics" – 2:36 (Serge Gainsbourg)
4. "Sorry" – 3:33 (Madonna, Stuart Price)
5. "New Year's Day" – 4:04 (U2)
6. "Les Champs-Élysées" – 3:27 (Pierre Delanoë, Mike Deighan, Michael Wilshaw)
7. "Da Ya Think I'm Sexy?" – 3:50 (Carmine Appice, Duane Hitchings, Rod Stewart )
8. "Aimer d'amour" – 3:17 (George Thurston, Léo Sayer, Albert Hammond)
9. "C'est comme ça" – 3:35 (Fred Chichin, Catherine Ringer)
10. "Je veux tout" – 2:50 (Ariane Moffatt)
11. "À ma fille" – 3:50 (Charles Aznavour)
12. "The Sound of Silence" – 4:31 (Paul Simon)
13. "Everybody Knows" – 5:58 (Leonard Cohen, Sharon Robinson)

== Charts ==
=== Weekly charts ===
Chart (2009–2010)	Peak position
Belgian Albums (Ultratop Wallonia)	15
French Albums (SNEP)	35
Swiss Albums (Schweizer Hitparade)	30

=== Year-end charts ===
Chart (2010)	Position
Belgian Albums (Ultratop Wallonia)	71
