= Luc de Larochellière =

Canadian singer from Laval, Quebec

Luc De Larochellière
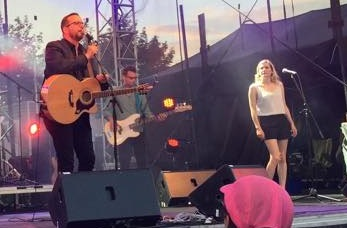

Background information
- Born: 27 April 1966 (age 60); Laval, Quebec, Canada
- Genres: Pop
- Occupations: Singer, songwriter
- Instrument: Vocals
- Years active: 1988–present
- Labels: Trafic, Zéro musique, Victoire
- Website: www.lucdelarochelliere.com

Luc De Larochellière (born 27 April 1966) is a Canadian singer-songwriter from Laval, Quebec.

== Career ==
Larochellière performed at the Festival de la chanson de Granby, Quebec, winning a number of awards. This led to his signing to the Trafic record label in 1988. De Larochellière released his debut album Amère America. The album resulted in a number of hits including the title track "Amère America" as well as "La route est longue" and "Chinatown Blues". The album was certified gold.

In 1990, Larochellière released Sauvez mon âme; several singles from this album were popular in Quebec, including like "Sauvez mon âme", "Ma génération", "Cash City", "Si j'te disais reviens" and "Si fragile".

De Larochellière attracted a following throughout the 1990s though with lesser success and in 1993 co-founded Zéro Musique with François Pérusse. In 2014, he released a compilation album of his biggest hits under the title En bref.

In 2017 De Larochellière was named French Songwriter of the Year at the Canadian Folk Music Awards.

== Awards and nominations ==
- In 1991, De Larochellière album won three Félix Awards for Best Show, Best Pop/Rock Album and for De Larochellière the Best Male Singer of the Year in Quebec's ADISQ 1991 awards
- The same year, he was nominated for best Album during the French Victoires de la musique.
- During the Juno Awards of 1992, he won the Juno Award for Francophone Album of the Year for the album.
- During the Juno Awards of 2010, he was nominated for Francophone Album of the Year for his album Un toi dans ma tête

== Personal life ==
Since 2012, he has lived with his wife, the Franco-Ontarian singer Andrea Lindsay, with whom he released the joint album C'est d'l'amour ou c'est comme in 2012.

== Discography ==
=== Albums ===
- 1988: Amère America (Trafic)
- 1990: Sauvez mon âme (Trafic)
- 1993: Los Angeles (Zéro musique)
- 1996: Les Nouveaux Héros (Zéro musique)
- 2000: Vu d'ici (Victoire)
- 2004: Quelque chose d'animal (Victoire)
- 2006: Voix croisées (Victoire)
- 2009: Un toi dans ma tête (Victoire)
- 2012: C'est d'l'amour ou c'est comme (joint album with Andrea Lindsay)
- 2016: Autre Monde (Victoire)
- 2021: Rhapsodie Lavalloise (Les disques de la cordonnerie)

Compilation albums

- 2014: En bref

=== Singles ===
(selective, in alphabetical order of title)

- "Amère America" (1988)
- "Beauté perdue"
- "Cash City" (1990)
- "Chinatown Blues" (1988)
- "J'ai vu"
- "La route est longue" (1988)
- "Ma génération" (1990)
- "Sauvez mon âme" (1990)
- "Si fragile" (1990)
- "Si j'te disais reviens" (1990)
- "Un toi dans ma tête"
