= Piece of My Soul (Garou album) =

Studio album by Garou
- Released: 6 May 2008
- Genre: Pop
- Labels: Sony BMG, Columbia

Garou chronology
| Garou (2006) | Piece of My Soul (2008) | Gentleman cambrioleur (2009) |

Singles from Piece of My Soul
- 1. "Stand Up" Released: 2008; 2. "Heaven's Table" Released: 2008; 3. "First Day of My Life" Released: 2009

Professional ratings
Review scores
| Source | Rating |
|---|---|
| Allmusic | 2.5/5 stars |

Piece of My Soul is the fourth studio album by Canadian singer Garou, and his fifth album overall. After several French albums, this is Garou's first English album.

== Track listing ==
1. "Stand Up" – 3:51 (Rob Thomas) prod. Peer Åström
2. "Accidental" – 3:47 (Anders Wollbeck/Wayne Hector/Mattias Lindblom) prod. Peer Astrom
3. "Burning" – 3:20 (Anders Melander) prod. Peer Åström
4. "Heaven's Table" – 3:16 (Martin Sutton/Don Mescall) Peer Åström/Anders Bagge/[Vito Luprano]
5. "All the Way" – 2:58 (Carl Falk/Alex Vargas/Kevin Hughes/Pierre Garand) prod. Peer Åström
6. "Take a Piece of My Soul" – 3:17 (Aldo Nova/Anders Barren) prod. Peer Åström/Vito Luprano/Anders Barren)
7. "What's the Time in NYC" – 4:19 (Ronan Hardiman/Don Mescall) prod. Peer Åström
8. "You and I" – 3:22 (Judie Tzuke/Lucie Silvas/Graham Kearns/Charlie Russell) prod. Peer Astrom
9. "First Day of My Life" – 4:08 (Guy Chambers/Enrique Iglesias) prod. Peer Astrom/Anders Bagge/Vito Luprano
10. "Nothing Else Matters" – 3:35 (Dimitri Ehrlich/Andy Marvel) prod. Peer Åström
11. "Back for More" – 3:44 (Kristian Lundin/Andreas Carlsson) prod. Jake Schulze/Kristian Lundin
12. "Beautiful Regret" – 3:30 (Martin Sutton/Don Mescall) prod. Peer Astrom/Anders Bagge/Vito Luprano
13. "Coming Home" – 3:35 (Peer Åström/Aldo Nova), prod. Aldo Nova

== Charts ==
| Chart (2008) | Peak position |
|---|---|
| Belgian (Wallonia) Albums Chart | 3 |
| Canadian Albums Chart | 2 |
| French SNEP Albums Chart | 3 |
| Polish Albums Chart | 7 |
| Swiss Albums Chart | 8 |

| End of year chart (2008) | Position |
|---|---|
| Belgian (Wallonia) Albums Chart | 72 |
| French Albums Chart | 163 |

== Certifications ==
| Region | Certification | Certified units/sales |
|---|---|---|
| Canada (Music Canada) | Gold | 40,000^{^} |
| Poland (ZPAV) | Gold | 10,000^{*} |
| Russia (NFPF) | Platinum | 20,000^{*} |
^{*} Sales figures based on certification alone.^{^} Shipments figures based on certification alone.
