= Phil Barney =

French singer-songwriter

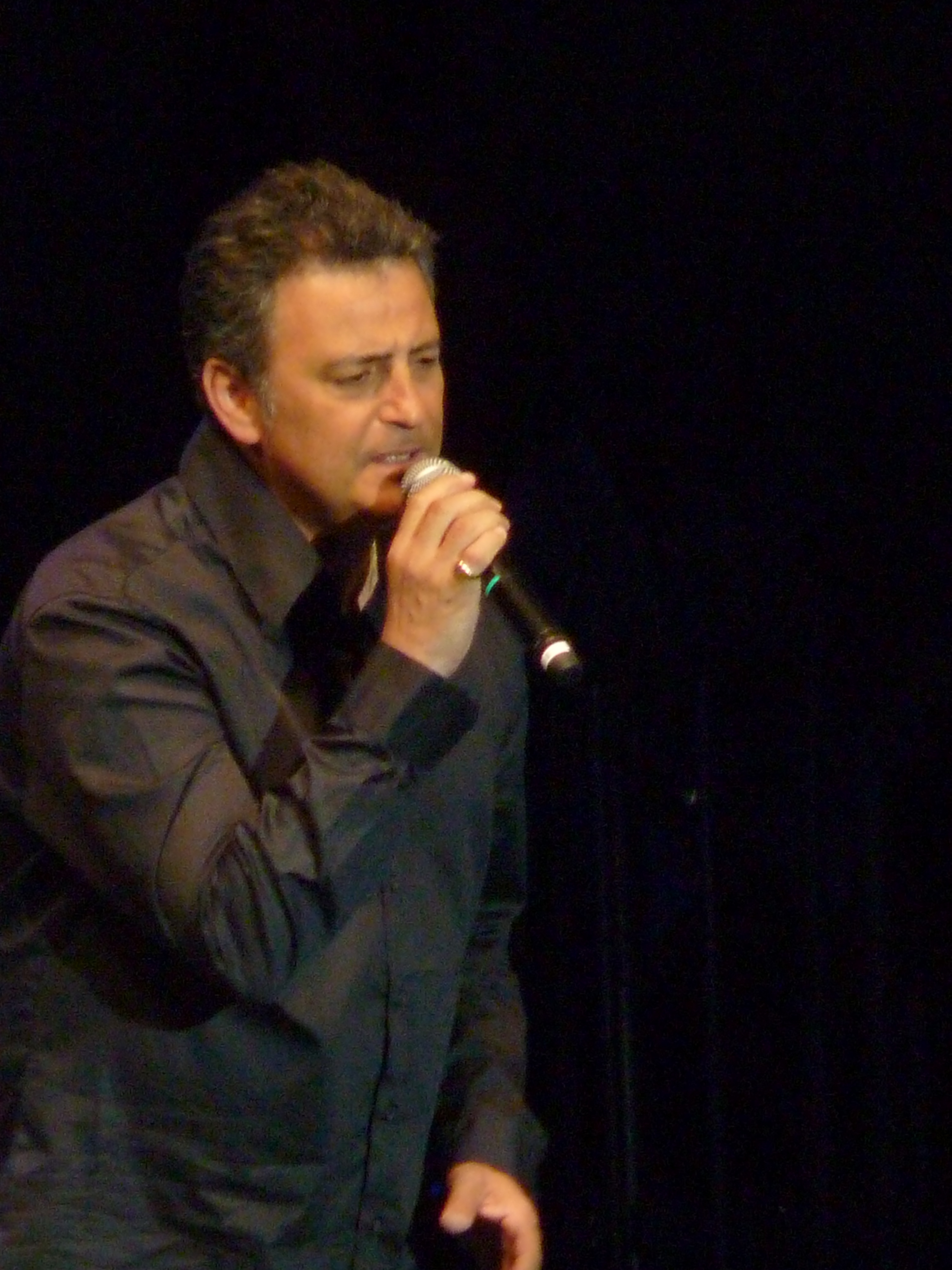
- Phil Barney performing at La Nuit des Hits of Juan-les-Pins for Enfant Star & Match association.

Background information
- Born: Philippe Baranès; February 2, 1957 (age 69)
- Origin: Algeria
- Genres: Pop, Rap
- Occupations: Singer, songwriter
- Years active: 1987–present
- Website: Official site

Phil Barney (real name : Philippe Baranès, born February 2, 1957, in Annaba, Algeria) is a French singer-songwriter. He was particularly successful with his 1987 song "Un Enfant de toi".

== Biography ==
In the 1980s, Phil Barney had several success on the French Singles Chart, including the big hit "Un Enfant de toi", his first single, which was a number three hit in November 1987. "Avec qui tu vis", "Tellement je pense à toi", "Il est parti" and "Loin de tes bras" were among his other singles, but they achieved a moderate success in comparison with his debut single. Most of his songs are pop ballads related with romantic themes. However, throughout his career, Barney changed his musical style and also recorded rap songs.

He published several studio albums, but the last ones passed almost unnoticed. In 2002, he covered his 1987 hit in a duet version with Marlène Duval and obtained a huge success since the song became a number-one single, but this notoriety remained temporary and he fell again into anonymity after this come back. In 2012, he was on stage with Philippe Cataldo, Joniece Jamison and DJ Cyprien Rose for the opening of a new concert hall, the Mood's, in Paris.

== Discography ==
=== Albums ===
- 1987 : Recto-verseau
- 1990 : Tour d'ivoire
- 1992 : Carnets de route
- 1995 : Partager tout
- 1996 : Histoire confidentielles - #30 in Belgium
- 1998 : Voleurs de rêve
- 2002 : C'est promis

=== Singles ===
- 1987 : "Un Enfant de toi" - #3 in France
- 1988 : "Avec qui tu vis" - #23 in France
- 1991 : "Tellement je pense à toi" - #32 in France
- 1991 : "Il est parti" - #36 in France
- 1992 : "Loin de tes bras" - #40 in France
- 2002 : "Un Enfant de toi" - #1 in France, #1 in Belgium

=== Other songs ===
- "Celui qui passe"
- "Chanson désenchantée"
- "Comédie d'amour"
- "Histoire confidentielle"
- "J'ai fait un rêve"
- "J'voudrai qu'on reste amis"
- "Le Souvenir de toi"
- "Ma vie c'est la musique"
- "Mrs Jones"
- "Nouveau monde"
- "Partager tout"
- "Seul"
- "Tour d'ivoire"
- "Un cœur qui danse"
- "Voleurs de rêves"
