= Modern Times (song) =

Single by J-five

from the album Sweet Little Nothing
- B-side: "Flags", "Turn It up"
- Released: February 2004
- Genre: Alternative hip hop
- Length: 3:16
- Label: Warner M.
- Songwriter(s): J-Five, Daniderff, N. Godsend, D. Godsend, Bertal, Mel Richd; Maubon
- Producer(s): Mel Richd, D. Godsend, N. Godsend

J-five singles chronology
"Modern Times" (2004)	"Find a Way" (2004)

"Modern Times" is a 2004 song recorded by the Californian singer J-five. Released in 2004 as the first single from his debut album Sweet Little Nothing on which it is the third track, "Modern Times" achieved a success in many European countries, topping the charts in France, traditionally a nation where Chaplin films are most popular.

== Release ==
The song is a tribute to Charlie Chaplin, and particularly his film Modern Times. The chorus of the song is the original recording of Chaplin's gibberish singing from the end of the film (the first time Chaplin's voice had been heard in any of his films, using a deliberately vague mixture of languages).

A music video was produced to illustrate this track, using the appropriate scene from the Chaplin film with the exclusive participation of Dolores Chaplin.

The song is included on the following compilations, released in 2004 in France: Best Of 2004, R&B 2004, NRJ Hit Music Only and Fan2.

== Chart performance ==
In France, the single entered the chart at No. 15 on February 29, 2004, and gained a few places every week until topping the chart for one week, on March 21. The weeks after, the single almost didn't stop to drop on the chart and totaled nine weeks in the top ten, 17 weeks in the top 50 and 25 weeks on the chart. It was certified Silver disc by the SNEP and was ranked No. 33 on the End of the Year Chart.

== Track listings ==
- CD single
1. "Modern Times" featuring Charlie Chaplin – 3:16
2. "Flags" – 3:22
- CD maxi
1. "Modern Times" featuring Charlie Chaplin – 3:16
2. "Flags" – 3:22
3. "Turn It up" – 2:06
- CD maxi
1. "Modern Times" (original version) featuring Charlie Chaplin – 3:23
2. "Modern Times" (rove dogs remix) – 3:43
3. "Flags" – 2:06
4. "Modern Times" (video)

== Personnel ==
- Recorded by Len Corey
- Produced by D&N Godsend and Mel Richd
- Artwork by Objectif Lune
- Photography by S. Girzard

"Modern Times"

- Written by J-Five / Daniderff / D&N Godsend / Mel Richd/Bertal & Maubon
- Engineered by Len Corey
- Performed by J-Five and Charles Chaplin
- Charles Chaplin appears courtesy of Roy Export Ltd.

"Flags"

- Written by J-Five / D&N Godsend / Mel Richd
- Engineered Len Corey

Rove dogs remix

- Vocals and keyboards by Franck Lascombes
- Engineered and mixed by Mr Clean

== Charts and sales ==
=== Weekly charts ===
Chart (2004)	Peak position
Belgian (Wallonia) Singles Chart	9
Dutch Singles Chart	36
French SNEP Singles Chart	1
Italian Singles Chart	12
Swiss Singles Chart	15

^{1} Remix

=== Year-end charts ===
Chart (2004)	Position
Belgian (Wallonia) Singles Chart	47
French Singles Chart	33
Swiss Singles Chart	74

=== Certifications ===
Certifications for "Modern Times"
Region	Certification	Certified units/sales
France (SNEP)	Silver	125,000^{*}
^{*} Sales figures based on certification alone.
