= Version intégrale =

Studio album by Garou
- Released: 29 November 2010
- Genre: Pop
- Label: Columbia

Garou chronology
Gentleman cambrioleur (2009)	Version intégrale (2010)	Rhythm and Blues (2012)

Version intégrale is the sixth studio album by Canadian singer Garou, and his seventh album overall.

== Track listing ==
1. "J'avais besoin d'être là" – 3:57 (Jacques Veneruso)
2. "Version intégrale" – 3:37 (Marc Dupré)
3. "Je resterai le même" – 4:46 (Iren Bo, Patrick Hampartzoumian)
4. "Si tu veux que je ne t'aime plus" – 2:36 (François Welgryn, Davide Esposito)
5. "For You" – 3:29 (Jean-Jacques Goldman, Garou, Carole Fredericks, Jacques Veneruso)
6. "Salutations distinguées" – 4:45 (Pascal Obispo)
7. "Je l'aime encore" – 4:20 (Félix Gray)
8. "Bonne espérance" – 4:00 (Mike Ibrahim)
9. "Mise à jour" – 3:40 (Garou)
10. "Un nouveau monde" – 3:53 (Jacques Veneruso)
11. "Passagers que nous sommes" – 3:17 (Marie Bastide)
12. "T'es là" – 3:23 (Garou)
13. "La Scène" – 3:23

== Charts ==
Chart (2012)	Peak position
Belgian Albums Chart (Wallonia)	24
Canadian Albums Chart	30
French Albums Chart	33
Swiss Albums Chart	36
