= Seul (album) =

Studio album by Garou
- Released: November 13, 2000
- Genre: Pop
- Labels: Columbia, Sony Music
- Producer: Vito Luprano

Garou chronology
Seul (2000)	Seul... avec vous (2001)

Singles from Seul
- 1. "Seul" Released: October 2000; 2. "Je n'attendais que vous" Released: April 2001; 3. "Sous le vent" Released: October 2001; 4. "Gitan" Released: 2001

Professional ratings
Review scores
Source	Rating
Allmusic	3.5/5 stars

Seul is the debut album by Canadian singer Garou. Released in November 2000, this album was a great success across the francophone countries, reaching the top of the charts in France and Belgium (Wallonia) and becoming the best-selling album of 2001. It contains the hit single "Seul" which also topped the charts in these countries.

== Track listing ==
1. "Gitan" (Luc Plamondon, Romano Musumarra) – 4:05
2. "Que l'amour est violent" (Luc Plamondon, Aldo Nova, Rick Virag) – 5:41
3. "Demande au soleil" (Luc Plamondon, Romano Musumarra) – 5:34
4. "Seul" (Luc Plamondon, Romano Musumarra) – 4:41
5. "Sous le vent" featuring Céline Dion (Jacques Veneruso) – 3:31
6. "Je n'attendais que vous" (Jacques Veneruso) – 5:18
7. "Criminel" (Luc Plamondon, Franck Langolff) – 3:45
8. "Le Calme plat" (Élisabeth Anaïs, Franck Langolff) – 4:10
9. "Au plaisir de ton corps" (Luc Plamondon, Aldo Nova, Rick Virag) – 4:38
10. "La Moitié du ciel" (Élisabeth Anaïs, Richard Cocciante) – 4:11
11. "Lis dans mes yeux" (Erick Benzi) – 4:04
12. "Jusqu'à me perdre" (Bryan Adams, Elliot Kennedy, Luc Plamondon) – 4:27
13. "Gambler" (Marc Drouin, Christophe Rose) – 4:37
14. "L'Adieu" (Didier Barbelivien) – 4:01

== Certifications ==
Country	Certification	Date	Sales certified	Physical sales
Belgium (Wallonia)	2 x Platinum	5 January 2002	100,000	
Canada	3 x Platinum	28 May 2002	300,000	
Europe	2 x Platinum		2,000,000	
France	Diamond	2001	1,000,000	1,553,500
Poland	Platinum		100,000	
Switzerland	2 x Platinum	2003	60,000	

== Charts ==
Chart (2000–2002)	Peak position
Belgian (Wallonia) Albums Chart	1
Canadian Albums Chart	2
French Albums Chart	1
Polish Albums Chart	1
Swiss Albums Chart	9

End of year chart (2000)	Position
Belgian (Wallonia) Albums Chart	78
Canadian Albums (Nielsen SoundScan)	61
French Albums Chart	21
End of year chart (2001)	Position
Belgian (Wallonia) Albums Chart	1
Canadian Albums (Nielsen SoundScan)	52
French Albums Chart	1
Swiss Albums Chart	25
End of year chart (2002)	Position
Belgian (Wallonia) Albums Chart	39
French Albums Chart	42
Swiss Albums Chart	78
