= La Rivière de notre enfance =

Single by Garou and Michel Sardou

from the album Du Plaisir & Reviens
- B-side: "L'Aveu"
- Released: 14 November 2004
- Genre: Pop
- Length: 3:24
- Label: Columbia, Sony Music
- Songwriter: Didier Barbelivien
- Producer: Erick Benzi

Garou singles chronology
"Reviens (Où te caches-tu?)" (2003)	"La Rivière de notre enfance" (2004)	"Tu es comme ça" (2005)

"La Rivière de notre enfance" is a 2004 song recorded as a duet by Canadian singer Garou and French singer Michel Sardou. Written by Didier Barbelivien, it was released in November 2004 as the third single from Garou's second studio album, Reviens, as well as the first single from Sardou's 2004 album, Du Plaisir. The song was a No. 1 hit in France and the Walloon region of Belgium, and it reached the top 20 in Switzerland. It was the fourth number-one hit in France for Garou. It appears on the charity album Solidarité Asie.

== Track listings ==
CD single

1. "La Rivière de notre enfance" – 3:24
2. "L'Aveu" (live) by Garou – 4:43
3. "La Rivière de notre enfance" (instrumental version) – 3:24

Digital download

1. "La Rivière de notre enfance" – 3:24

== Charts ==
=== Weekly charts ===
Chart (2004–2005)	Peak position
Belgian (Wallonia) Singles Chart	1
French Singles Chart	1
Swiss Singles Chart	14

=== Year-end charts ===
Chart (2004)	Position
Belgian (Wallonia) Singles Chart	54
French Singles Chart	10

Chart (2005)	Position
Belgian (Wallonia) Singles Chart	35
Europe (Eurochart Hot 100)	46
French Singles Chart	47
Swiss Singles Chart	79

== Certifications ==
Country	Certification	Date	Sales certified
France	Gold	22 December 2004	250,000
