= La Musique =

"La Musique (Angelica)"

Single by Star Academy France

from the album L'Album
- B-side: "Remix"
- Released: December 2001
- Recorded: France, 2001
- Genre: Pop
- Length: 3:24
- Label: Island, Universal Music
- Songwriter(s): FB Cool, Ann Grégory (real name : Arlette Kotchounian); Barry Mann, SDO, Cynthia Weil
- Producer(s): FB Cool, SDO

Star Academy France singles chronology
"La Musique (Angelica)" (2001)	"Gimme! Gimme! Gimme! (A Man After Midnight)" (2002)

"La Musique (Angelica)" is a 2001 song recorded by the contestants of the first edition of French TV reality show Star Academy. The song was released as a single in December 2001 from the album L'Album and also recorded in a live version on the album Live. Cover of a 1960s song, this version achieved a huge success in France in terms of chart positions and sales.

== Song information ==
The song "Angelica" was written by Barry Mann and Cynthia Weil, in English, and first recorded by Gene Pitney in 1966 (titled Angelique) but it wasn't released at the time. The first released version was by Mann in 1966. Versions were then recorded by various other artists, including The Sandpipers, Scott Walker, Roy Hamilton, (his last recording, after Elvis Presley, who was scheduled in late January 1969 to record it, turned it over to him), and, in 1970, the American singer Oliver, whose version scraped into the Billboard Hot 100 in the US.

Earlier, in 1967, French singer Nicoletta made her own modified version of the song, under the title "La Musique", but this cover passed unnoticed at the time. Thirty-four years later, this version was covered by Star Academy France which decided to consider this cover as the show's anthem and the lead single from its debut album. Fourteen contestants participated in the recording of the new version which particularly puts foreword the singing.

The song became a smash success in France: it went straight to number-one on December 8, 2001, and stayed there for nine weeks. Then it dropped regularly, totalling 12 weeks in the top ten, 19 weeks in the top 50 and 24 weeks in the top 100. Certified Diamond disc by the SNEP only two weeks after its release, the song became the fifth best-selling single of the 21st century in France, with 1,140,000 units sold.

== Track listing ==
CD single

1. "La Musique (Angelica)" (mix radio) — 3:24
2. "La Musique (Angelica)" (mix mega) — 3:40
3. "La Musique (Angelica)" (instrumental mix radio) — 3:24

== Credits and personnel ==
Mix radio

- Arranged, produced and mixed by SDO and FB Cool for Herbert Music
- Recorded at Studio Heben and at the castle by Yves Jaget

Mix Mega

- Produced and arranged by SDO and FB Cool for Herbert Music
- Recorded at Studio Heben and at the castle by Yves Jaget
- Guitars: Fabrice Ragot
- Brass: Christian Martinez, Thierry Farrugia and Denis Leloup

== Charts and sales ==
=== Peak positions ===
Chart (2001–2002)	Peak position
Belgian (Wallonia) Singles Chart	1
French SNEP Singles Chart	1
Swiss Singles Chart	12

=== Year-end charts ===
Chart (2001)	Position
French Singles Chart	1
Belgian (Wallonia) Singles Chart	3
Chart (2002)	Position
Belgian (Wallonia) Singles Chart	26
Europe (Eurochart Hot 100)	19
French Singles Chart	11
Swiss Singles Chart	100

=== Certifications ===
Country	Certification	Date	Sales certified
Belgium	3 x Platinum	January 12, 2002	120,000
France	Diamond	December 19, 2001	750,000
