= Seul (song) =

2000 single by Garou

Single by Garou

from the album Seul
- B-side: "Que l'amour est violent", "Adieu"
- Released: October 2000
- Genre: Pop
- Length: 4:41
- Label: Columbia, Sony Music
- Songwriters: Luc Plamondon (lyrics); Romano Musumarra (music)
- Producer: Vito Luprano

Garou singles chronology
"Dieu que le monde est injuste" (1999)	"Seul" (2000)	"Je n'attendais que vous" (2001)

"Seul" is a 2000 song recorded by the Canadian singer Garou. It was released in October 2000 as the first single from his debut album, Seul, on which it features as the fourth track. It achieved a smash success in France and Belgium (Wallonia) where it topped the charts for three months, and was a top ten hit in Switzerland. To date, it is his most successful solo single (Garou has other #1 in duets and a trio).

== Background and performances ==
The song was written by the songwriter Luc Plamondon, who also wrote "Belle" about two years before, composed by Romano Musumarra who also composed several hits for various artists such as Elsa Lunghini, Jeanne Mas and Princess Stéphanie of Monaco and produced by Erick Benzi, who also participated in the 1995 two hits of Céline Dion.

The song was also performed on Garou's 2001 concert and was thus included on his live album Seul... avec vous, as 13th track. It features on many French compilations, such as Hits France 2001, NRJ Music Awards 2002, and was also the second track on Garou's 2006 single, "L'Injustice".

== Chart performance ==
In France, "Seul" entered the singles chart in low positions on 23 December 2000, jumped quickly and reached number one three weeks later, staying there for eleven weeks, then was number two for three weeks. It totalled 16 weeks in the top ten, 21 weeks in the top 50 and 25 weeks on the chart (top 100). As of August 2014, the song was the 21st best-selling single of the 21st century in France, with 559,000 units sold.

== Track listings ==
- CD single
1. "Seul" – 4:41
2. "Que l'amour est violent" – 5:41
3. "L'Adieu" – 4:02
- Digital download
1. "Seul" – 4:41
2. "Seul" (live)

== Charts ==
=== Weekly charts ===
Weekly chart performance for "Seul"
Chart (2000–02)	Peak position
Belgium (Ultratop 50 Wallonia)	1
France (SNEP)	1
Poland (Polish Airplay Chart)	3
Switzerland (Schweizer Hitparade)	10

=== Year-end charts ===
Year-end chart performance for "Seul"
Chart (2001)	Position
Belgium (Wallonia Ultratop 40)	2
Europe (Eurochart Hot 100)	18
France (SNEP)	3
Switzerland (Schweizer Hitparade)	47

== Certifications ==
Certifications for "Seul"
Region	Certification	Certified units/sales
France (SNEP)	Diamond	750,000^{*}
^{*} Sales figures based on certification alone.
