= Garou (singer) =

Canadian singer and actor (born 1972)

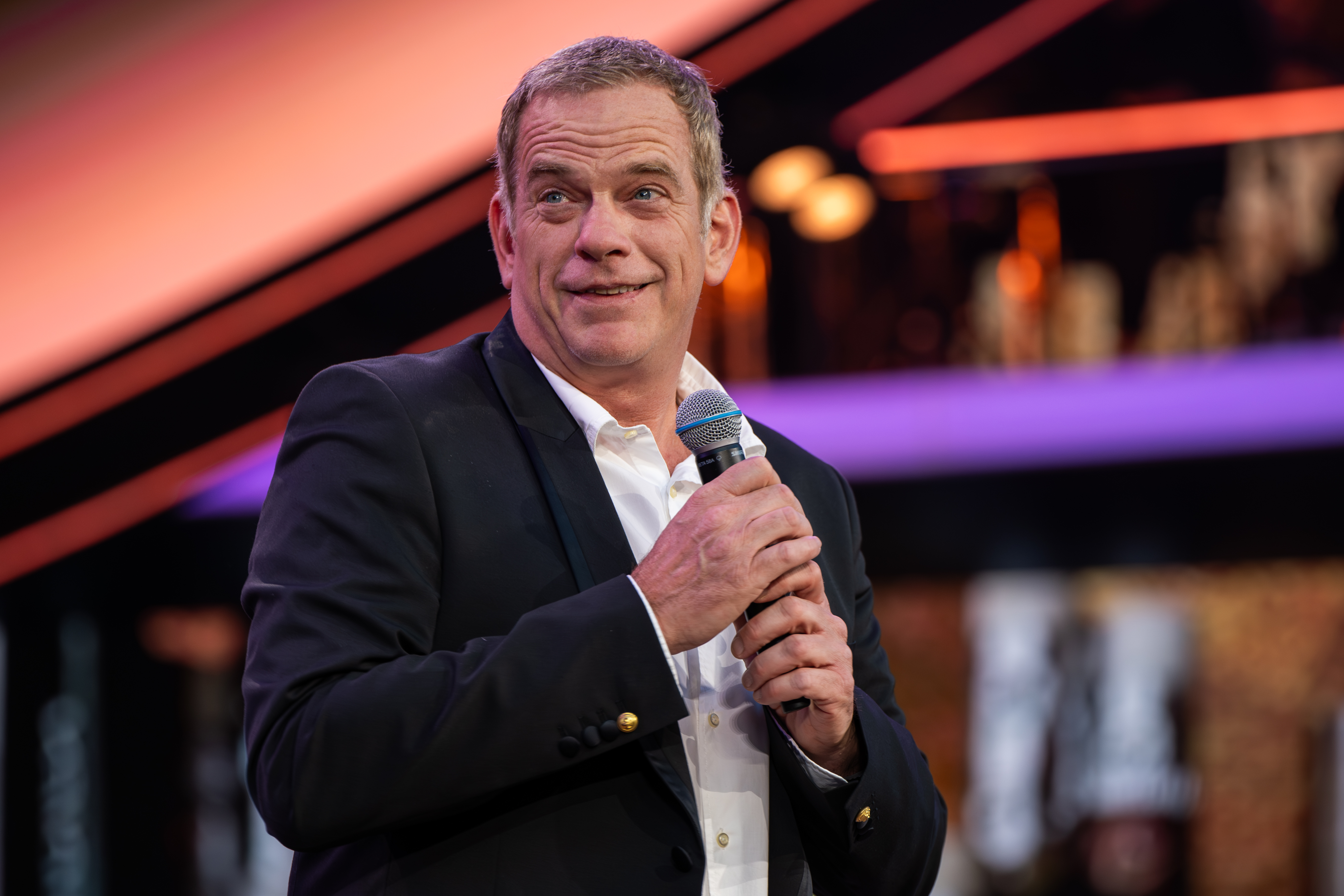
- Garou in 2025

Background information
- Born: Pierre Garand; 26 June 1972 (age 54)
- Origin: Sherbrooke, Canada
- Genres: Pop
- Occupations: Singer, actor
- Instruments: Vocals; guitar
- Works: Garou discography
- Years active: 1995–present
- Labels: Sony Music Canada; Sony Music France; Mercury
- Formerly of: The Untouchables
- Website: garouofficiel.com

Pierre Garand (French pronunciation: [pjɛʁ ɡaʁɑ̃]; born 26 June 1972), known by his stage name Garou (French pronunciation: [ɡaʁu]; a diminutive of his last name), is a Canadian singer and actor from Sherbrooke, Québec. He sings in French and English.

He is known for his work in the musical Notre-Dame de Paris (playing Quasimodo in both the original French and English casts) and the No. 1 hits "Belle", "Seul", "Sous le vent", and "La Rivière de notre enfance".

== Life and career ==
Pierre Garand began playing guitar at the age of three, at the encouragement of his father. He went on to serve in the military and started a band in 1992 called the Untouchables. In 1997, he was discovered by Luc Plamondon while singing American blues tunes in a Sherbrooke bar. He was drafted by Plamondon to play the role of Quasimodo in his musical Notre-Dame de Paris, which made him a star in France and launched his singing career. He went on to play the role for three years.

His first studio album, Seul, became the best-selling French record of 2001 and remains one of the best-selling French albums of all time, achieving two million sales in Europe and going three times Platinum in Canada.

He continued his string of hits with a live album and released a second studio record, Reviens, in 2003. Sales for his third album, Garou, remained strong, and he issued the English crossover record Piece of My Soul in 2008. It debuted at No. 2 in Canada and No. 3 in France. Despite this success, the album became his first in France not to reach Platinum status, although it became his best-selling record in North America in seven years. His next album, Gentleman cambrioleur, featured cover songs in French and English and became his first record to miss the top five in France, where it modestly peaked at No. 35, staying on the charts for 17 weeks. He released Version intégrale in 2010, which became another top 40 hit in France and Canada.

Garou performed the Jean-Pierre Ferland song "Un peu plus haut, un peu plus loin" at the 2010 Winter Olympics opening ceremony in Vancouver. He has also performed at the charity event Les Enfoirés for the past 19 years.

In 2011, he was cast in the lead role of Zark in the Cirque du Soleil musical Zarkana, in New York City.

Since 2010, Garou has released five further studio albums: Rhythm and Blues (2012), Au milieu de ma vie (2013), It's Magic! (2014), Soul City (2019), and Garou joue Dassin (2022).

In 2025, he released Un meilleur lendemain, the first album in his career to consist entirely of songs written by him.

== Collaborations ==
Garou has collaborated with a number of musicians and composers, including with Luc Plamondon in Notre-dame de Paris. The single "Belle" was lifted from the musical and stayed atop the French charts for a record-breaking 18 weeks. It remained the most successful song in French history until 2009. In 2000, he had a successful duet with Celine Dion; "Sous le vent" became his third No. 1 single in France. In 2004, he worked with Michel Sardou for his fourth and final No. 1 single, "La Rivière de notre enfance". The following year, he appeared with 15-year-old singer Marilou on her song "Tu es comme ça". 2008's Piece of My Soul, his first English album, includes a songwriting credit by Rob Thomas on the track "Stand Up".

== Personal life ==
Garou has a daughter, born in 2001, with an ex-girlfriend. He has also dated former Yemeni singer and entertainer Arwa Jassem, known as Lahlouba. From 2007 to June 2010, he dated French singer Lorie.

== Discography ==
- Seul (2000)
- Reviens (2003)
- Garou (2006)
- Piece of My Soul (2008)
- Gentleman cambrioleur (2009)
- Version intégrale (2010)
- Rhythm and Blues (2012)
- Au milieu de ma vie (2013)
- It's Magic! (France) / Xmas Blues (Canada) (2014)
- Soul City (2019)
- Garou joue Dassin (2022)
- Un meilleur lendemain (2025)

== See also ==
- List of Quebec musicians
- Music of Quebec
- Culture of Quebec
