= Génération Goldman =

Compilation album tribute album by Various artists
- Released: 19 November 2012
- Genre: Pop
- Label: My Major Company

Various artists chronology
Génération Goldman (2012)	Génération Goldman Volume 2 (2013)

Singles from Génération Goldman
- 1. "Envole-moi" Released: 22 October 2012; 2. "Je te donne" Released: 21 December 2012; 3. "Là-bas" Released: 21 December 2012

Génération Goldman is a compilation/tribute album series containing interpretations of the songs of popular French singer and songwriter Jean-Jacques Goldman. It is released on My Major Company (France) noting that Michael Goldman, son of the artist is a co-founder of the label. Goldman has not released a studio album since 2001.

The original album Génération Goldman was released on 19 November 2012 on My Major Company France and M 6 Music label as a tribute to Goldman. A follow-up second volume was released on 26 August 2013 entitled Génération Goldman Volume 2.

Due to the popularity of the albums, in August 2014, the two volumes were re-released under one cover as Génération Goldman Vol. 1 and Vol. 2

== Génération Goldman ==
=== Songs ===
The album contains 14 tracks performed by 20 artists with "Envole-moi" performed by M. Pokora and Tal becoming the first single from the greatly anticipated album. On 19 November 2012, the day of the album's release, the new single, "Famille", was released.

Other artists to have tracks on the album include Amel Bent, Ivyrise, Corneille, Shy'm, Christophe Willem, Florent Mothe, Zaz and Amaury Vassili.

Track	Title	Performer(s)	Length
1.	"Envole-moi"	M. Pokora & Tal	3:07
2.	"Je te donne"	Leslie & Ivyrise	3:19
3.	"Famille"	Collégiale (collective)	4:56
4.	"Veiller tard"	Shy'm	3:33
5.	"Quand tu danses"	Corneille	3:47
6.	"Là-bas"	Marie-Mai & Baptiste Giabiconi	4:24
7.	"Au bout de mes rêves"	Emmanuel Moire & Amandine Bourgeois	3:17
8.	"Je marche seul"	Christophe Willem	2:46
9.	"Il suffira d'un signe"	Merwan Rim, Amaury Vassili, Baptiste Giabiconi & Dumè	3:18
10.	"On ira"	Florent Mothe & Judith	4:11
11.	"Comme toi"	Amel Bent	4:01
12.	"Pas l'indifférence"	Zaz	4:05
13.	"Il y a"	Christophe Willem & Zaho	3:39
14.	"Let's Talk About Love" (medley)	Irma & Zaz	4:10

=== Charts ===
==== Weekly charts ====
Chart (2012)	Peak position
Belgian Albums (Ultratop Flanders)	83
Belgian Albums (Ultratop Wallonia)	2
French Albums (SNEP)	1
Swiss Albums (Schweizer Hitparade)	3

==== Year-end charts ====
Chart (2012)	Position
Belgian Albums (Ultratop Wallonia)	41
French Albums (SNEP)	4
Chart (2013)	Position
Belgian Albums (Ultratop Wallonia)	20
French Albums (SNEP)	8
Swiss Albums (Schweizer Hitparade)	28
Chart (2014)	Position
Belgian Albums (Ultratop Wallonia)	197

==== Charting single releases from the album ====
Year	Goldman song	Credited performer(s)	Peak positions			Ref	Music video
Year	Goldman song	Credited performer(s)	FRA	BEL (Wa)	SUI	Ref	Music video
2012	"Envole-moi"	M. Pokora and Tal	5	7 (Ultratop)	39		
2012	"Famille"	Collégiale (The artists' collective)	49	5 (Ultratip)	-		
2012	"Je te donne"	Leslie and Ivyrise (fronting Ivyrise vocalist Ben Falinski)	38	3 (Ultratip)	-		
2012	"Comme toi"	Amel Bent	91	-	-		
2012	"Là-bas"	Marie-Mai and Baptiste Giabiconi	96	-	-		
2012	"On ira"	Florent Mothe + Judith	178	-	-		

=== Certifications ===
Country	Certification	Sales Certified
France	Diamond	500,000

== Génération Goldman Volume 2 ==
Génération Goldman Volume 2

Compilation album by Various artists
- Released: 26 August 2013
- Genre: Pop
- Label: My Major Company

Various artists chronology
Génération Goldman (2012)	Génération Goldman Volume 2 (2013)

Singles from Génération Goldman Volume 2
- 1. "Quand la musique est bonne" Released: 2013

After the success of the original album, a second volume of the Génération Goldman was released on 26 August 2013.

As a pre-release single from Volume 2, Amel Bent and Soprano interpreting "Quand la musique est bonne" charted in SNEP charts in May 2013.

=== Track listing ===
Track	Title	Performer(s)	Length
1.	"Quand la musique est bonne"	Amel Bent & Soprano	3:10
2.	"Pas toi"	Tal	4:08
3.	"Nos mains"	Amandine Bourgeois, Amel Bent, Brice Conrad, Corneille, Emmanuel Moire, Judith, Leslie, Mani Hoffman, Merwan Rim, Pauline, Sofia Essaïdi, Soprano, Tal & Zaho	3:33
4.	"Il changeait la vie"	La Troupe de Robin des Bois	3:44
5.	"Elle a fait un bébé toute seule"	Elisa Tovati & Mickael Miro	3:19
6.	"Juste après"	Emmanuel Moire & Pauline	4:31
7.	"Sache que je"	Judith	3:54
8.	"La vie par procuration"	Leslie & Pauline	4:08
9.	"Encore un matin"	Zaho	3:45
10.	"Bonne idée"	Corneille	3:22
11.	"Né en 17 à Leidenstadt"	Amaury Vassili, Anggun & Damien Sargue	3:53
12.	"Confidentiel"	Christophe Willem	3:10
13.	"Un, deux, trois"	Amandine Bourgeois, Mani Hoffman & Merwan Rim	3:51
14.	"Si je t'avais pas"	Bastien Lanza & Sofia Essaïdi	4:04
15.	"C'est ta chance"	Amandine Bourgeois, Angeline, Céline, Faustine, Kelly, Leslie, Sofia Essaïdi & Tal	3:58

=== Charts ===
==== Weekly charts ====
Chart (2013)	Peak position
Belgian Albums (Ultratop Flanders)	48
Belgian Albums (Ultratop Wallonia)	2
French Albums (SNEP)	1
Swiss Albums (Schweizer Hitparade)	2

==== Year-end charts ====
Chart (2013)	Position
Belgian Albums (Ultratop Wallonia)	29
French Albums (SNEP)	11
Chart (2014)	Position
French Albums (SNEP)	74

==== Charting single releases from the album ====
Year	Goldman song	Credited performer(s)	Peak positions			Ref	Music video
Year	Goldman song	Credited performer(s)	FRA	BEL (Wa)	SUI	Ref	Music video
2013	"Quand la musique est bonne"	Amel Bent and Soprano	40	5 (Ultratip)	–		
2013	"Nos mains"	Collégiale (The artists' collective)	72	4 (Ultratip)	–		
2013	"La vie par procuration"	Leslie & Pauline	146	–	–		

== Génération Goldman Vol. 1 and Vol. 2 ==
Génération Goldman Vol. 1 and Vol. 2

Compilation album by Various artists
- Released: August 2014
- Genre: Pop
- Label: My Major Company

After the success of the two original albums, in August 2014, a limited edition of the two albums was re-released together under one cover charting in its own right in France on the French SNEP Albums Chart.

=== Charts ===
Year (2013)	Peak position
Ultratop 50 Belgian Singles Chart (Vlanders)	48
Ultratop 50 Belgian Singles Chart (Wallonia)	2
SNEP French Albums Chart	83
