= Toi et Moi =

Toi et moi meaning You and Me may refer to:

== Films and television ==
- Toi et moi (film), 2006 French film by Julie Lopes-Curval

== Music ==
- Toi + Moi, an album by French singer Grégoire
  - "Toi + Moi" (song), title track from Grégoire's Toi + Moi album
- Toi et moi, a 1994 album by Charles Aznavour
  - "Toi et moi" (Charles Aznavour song), title track from Charles Aznavour's album Toi et moi
- "Toi et Moi" (Namie Amuro song)
- "Toi & moi", a song by Lorie from her 2005 album Best of
- "Toi et moi", a song by Colonel Reyel from his album 2012 album Soldat de l'amour
- "Toi et moi", a single from Guillaume Grand album L'amour est laid
- "Toi et moi", a song by French group Tryo, from their album Ce que l'on sème
- "Toi et moi", a song by Band-Maid from their 2024 album Epic Narratives
