= Baptiste Giabiconi =

French singer and model

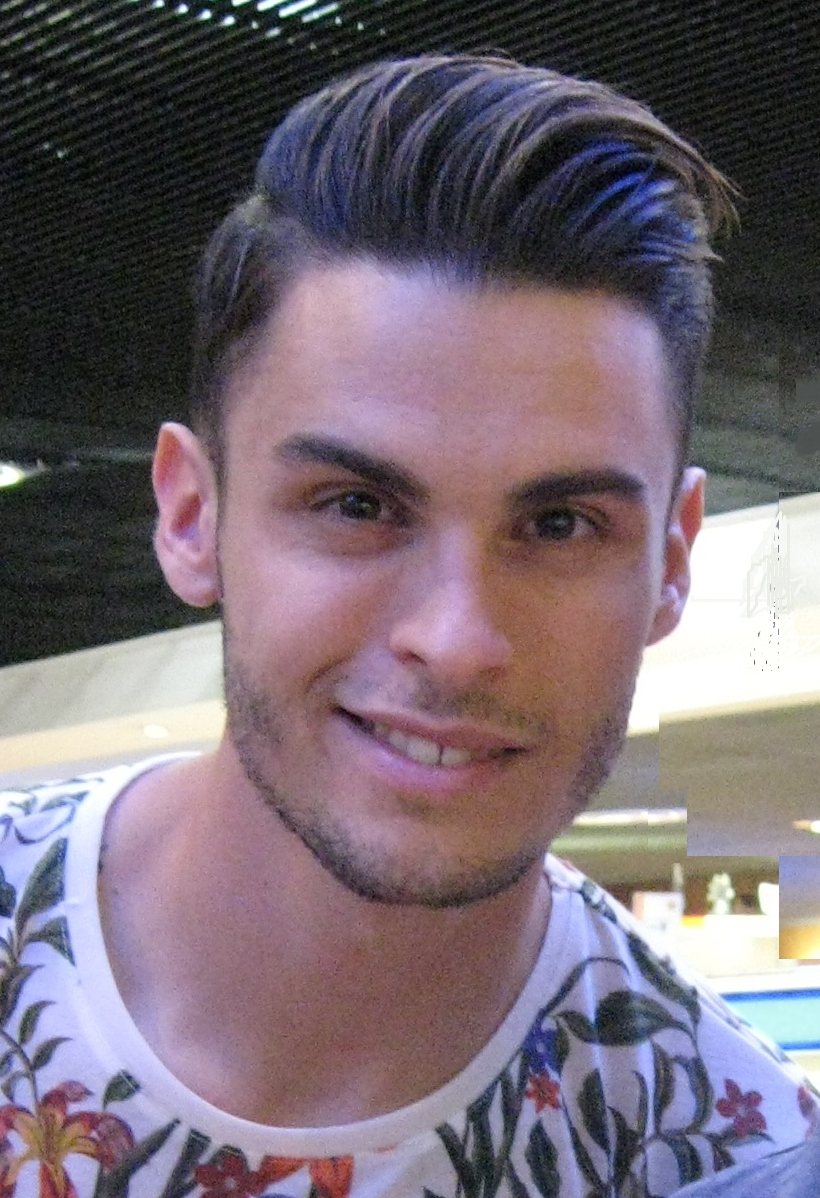
- Born: 9 November 1989 (age 36); Marignane, France
- Other name: Baptiste
- Modeling information
- Height: 1.85 m (6 ft 1 in)
- Hair color: Black
- Eye color: Brown
- Agency: DNA Model Management

Baptiste Giabiconi (born 9 November 1989) is a French model and singer. A muse of Karl Lagerfeld, for many years he was the male face of major fashion houses Chanel and Fendi.

== Early life ==
Born in Marignane, Bouches-du-Rhône, Baptiste Giabiconi comes from a Corsican family. His father is from Bastia and his mother Marie-France from Calvi, both in Corsica. He spent his infancy in Moriani-Plage in the Haute-Corse region very near to Bastia, before moving to Marseille.

He obtained a Brevet d'études professionnelles (BEP) in the food service industry, and a professional Baccalauréat in "Accueil et Service". Then he trained for six months as a mechanical adjustor in Aeronautics, landing a job at Eurocopter, an international helicopter manufacturing and support company.

== Modelling career ==
In January 2007, a talent scout seeing him in a Marseille sport club suggested he apply to a local Marseille modelling firm run by a local photographer. Giabiconi compiled a modelling file that was sent to a number of modeling agents but with no results and no offers forthcoming. He returned to Marseille but continued to model locally. In 2008, Giabiconi signed with DNA Model Management New York.

In the same year Karl Lagerfeld named Giabiconi the male face of Chanel, closing the haute couture house's shows in 2009 with Freja Beha Erichsen and Lara Stone and in 2010 with Abbey Lee and Iris Strubegger. In 2010, he appeared in Schwarzkopf ads becoming the face of their products. In 2011, he appeared in ads for the German car maker Volkswagen alongside Karl Lagerfeld. He was in the campaign for series of parfums, watches and eyeglasses of the brand Karl Lagerfeld. He was also the face of the headphone Monster. Giabiconi became the face of Coca-Cola Light, alongside Coco Rocha. The campaign was photographed by Lagerfeld.

In 2011, he was the image of Spring-Summer Edition of H&M.

He has also appeared in fashion spreads in Vogue (including Vogue Paris, Vogue Japan and Vogue Germany, Elle, Numéro Homme, V Man, Harper's Bazaar, Marie Claire, Purple Fashion, Giorgio Armani and L'Officiel Hommes, Interview, Wallpaper. In spring 2010, he was photographed for the Roberto Cavalli campaign, alongside Kate Moss and for Karl Lagerfeld. In 2010, he made the cover of L'Officiel Homme, posed for Envy, Elle (Paris and Belgium editions), Grazia, Vogue Germany. He appeared alongside Lara Stone in the short film Vol de jour by Karl Lagerfeld for the Chanel collection.

Baptiste was placed at number 1 on models.com listing of the Top 50 international male models for roughly two years before being replaced by Sean O'Pry. As of September 2011, he was placed on the more prominent "Icons" list of male models where he shares the No. 10 ranking with top male model, Werner Schreyer.

In January 2020, he took part in the show Stars à nu presented by Alessandra Sublet alongside many other stars. The closing choreography was designed by Chris Marques.

== Music career ==
Giabiconi released his debut single "Showtime" in 2010. In 2012, he announced an agreement with My Major Company fan-funded label to produce his debut album entitled Oxygen. The album with 13 tracks all in English language was released in September 2012 and entered the SNEP French Albums Chart straight in at number 1. The lead single from the album was "One Night in Paradise", a pre-release in promotion of the album. The follow-up single from the album is called "Speed of Light (L'amour & les étoiles)" and was released on 2 September 2012. A third single "Je te aime" was also released.

At the age of 16, in 2011, he auditioned for Nouvelle Star without qualifying for selection to the live rounds.

In 2012, he took part in tribute album project dedicated to Jean-Jacques Goldman songs called Génération Goldman singing Goldman's "Là-bas" as a duo with Quebec singer Marie-Mai. He was also on the track "Il suffira d'un signe" on the same album, singing with Merwan Rim, Amaury Vassili and Dumè.

In June 2014, he released his second album Un homme libre on Be 1st / Smart (a Sony Music affiliate) and his debut as a French language album with 12 tracks. The album unlike the first chart-topping album had only modest success reaching number 44 on the French SNEP Albums Chart. One single titled "Je t'emmène avec moi" charted from the album.

However Giabiconi's biggest musical success was in 2016 with his cover of the Donna Summer hit "Love to Love You Baby" but with added lyrics and new EDM arrangement. The release was accompanied by an erotic music video. It made it to number 4 on the official French Singles Chart.

== Business ventures ==
With two associate partners Patrice Merlo and Alexis Leng, Giabiconi created a theme restaurant called Tokio Sushi. Meant as a series of restaurants, the first one was launched at Saint-Victoret, Provence-Alpes-Côte d'Azur in May 2012, followed by a second in Velaux also in Provence-Alpes-Côte d'Azur in July 2014. The restaurants feature a sushi bar and Korean barbecue.

Baptiste Giabiconi launched in March 2015 et limited "capsule collection" of streetwear under the slogan "Giabiconi is my sexfriend" comprising mainly T-shirts with a smaller series titled "Karl is my father"also offered all to be marketed by the e-shop Eleven Paris, a brand with which Giabiconi is associated with. Giabiconi agreed to pose nude for the collection. The site for the clothing saw 200,000 visits in 48 hours. Some of the photos for the collection were taken by Karl Lagerfeld himself.

In 2016, Giabiconi published a calendar of 26 black and white photos photographed by Mariano Vivanco on éditions Michel Lafon.

On 16 May 2017, he became a major investor and president of the French National 2 football league club FC Martigues. The league is the fourth level of professional national association football league in France. However the venture soon turned sour and he was obliged to pend his resignation from the club position after a critical audit by Direction Nationale du Contrôle de Gestion (DNCG), the organization responsible for monitoring and overseeing the accounts of professional association football clubs in France.

In 2018, in partnership with Théo Griezmann, the brother of the international football star Antoine Griezmann, he created a limited brand of "capsule collection" Gz Brand X Giabiconi (as part of Griezmann's brand The GZ Brand) for the benefit of the charity FCM Fondation with the aim of installing football facilities in the poor suburbs, in youth hospitals and in prisons.

== In popular culture ==
- In 2009, supermodel Naomi Campbell met Giabiconi in Moscow and told him, "It's not right: We all have defects. You have none".
- In an interview with Karl Lagerfeld described Giabiconi as "a boy version of Gisele Bündchen: skinny, skinny but with an athletic body – good for clothes and great with no clothes".
- On 6 and 7 July 2012, he sang his song "Speed of Light (L'amour et les étoiles)" during Tout le monde chante contre le cancer charity event. On 15 September 2012, he sang the same song during Leurs voix pour l'espoir charity concert.
- Giabiconi appeared as special invitee guest in Mère et fille, the French Disney Channel mini-series broadcast in June 2012 in France.
- In 2012, he became a contestant on the popular French games series Fort Boyard
- Also in 2012, he took part in the 13th annual NRJ Music Awards besides Laurent Ournac for a medley of LMFAO songs. He also appeared in Tous ensemble on TF1 on 4 February 2012 and on La nuit nous appartient on NRJ12 channel on 18 October 2012 as well as ONDAR Show on France 2 on 20 October 2012.
- Baptiste Giabiconi participated in the celebrity edition of Top Chef on M6 channel in 2018 but was eliminated in the initial round.

== Personal life ==
It is widely accepted Baptiste Giabiconi was the designer Karl Lagerfeld's "muse" starting 2008 when Giabiconi was just 18. In a revealing book entitled Karl et moi (meaning Karl and me) published on 27 March 2020, Giabiconi wrote extensively about their relationship, saying it was more a platonic than a carnal one. He admitted at 18 he was a "blank page" and at the most opportune time was greatly affected as a young man by Lagerfeld. Giabiconi says: "Often, we hugged. It was a very powerful filial relationship, with a love we could not describe" adding that he called Lagerfeld "My Karl, my little Karl and sometimes my love". Lagerfeld was also "excessive" in lavishing him with gifts. Describing the affinity as more of a "father and son" relationship, Giabiconi says in the book that Lagerfeld even considered adopting him as his legal son adding: "Karl had no children. He really didn't have a family by his side and surely it was also to fill a certain emptiness, some lack, some loneliness. He just wanted me to be his son one way or another. I wanted to protect myself." Giabiconi also appeared nude in photos taken by Lagerfeld, but without getting involved sexually. Lagerfeld in his will also appropriated funds for his Birman cat Choupette which was originally Giabiconi's. When he left to see his mother for a few days and asked Mr. Lagerfeld to cat sit, he left the cat with Lagerfeld and within days, the latter developed great affection for the cat, so Giabiconi ceded it to Lagerfeld as a personal gift from him.

Giabiconi also revealed in an interview with the French TF1 talk show Sept à huit broadcast on 23 February 2020 that there were seven heirs named to Karl Lagerfeld's fortunes, and that Giabiconi's name was one of them. But people close to the family deny that he is part of the will and that the relations between the two had been strained for some time prior to Lagerfeld's death from prostate cancer.

He became a father on 17 July 2023, announcing on Instagram the birth of his son nicknamed Baptiste Jr. Giabiconi.

== Books ==
- Baptiste Giabiconi (collaborating with Jean-François Kervéan), Karl et moi, Paris, Robert Laffont, 2020, 240 p. ISBN 978-2221246894.

== Discography ==
=== Albums ===
Year	Album	Peak positions		Certification
Year	Album	FRA	BEL (Wa)	Certification
2012	Oxygen: Release date: 24 September 2012; Record label: My Major Company (promo) / Warner Music	1	171	
2014	Un Homme Libre: Release date: 16 June 2014; Record label: Be 1st / Smart (Sony Music)	44	156	

=== Singles ===
Year	Title	Chart positions		Album
Year	Title	FRA	BEL (Wa)	Album
2010	"Showtime"	—	—	Non-album release
2012	"One Night in Paradise"	—	51*	Oxygen
2012	"Speed of Light (L'amour et les étoiles)"	—	—	Oxygen
2012	"Là-bas" (Marie-Mai and Baptiste Giabiconi)	96	—	Génération Goldman
2014	"Je te aime"	110	—	Oxygen
2014	"Je t'emmène avec moi"	160	—	Un homme libre
2016	"Love to Love You Baby"	4	—	—N/a

*Did not appear in the official Belgian Ultratop 50 chart, but rather in the bubbling under Ultratip charts. Position in table reached by adding 50 positions to the actual Ultratip position

=== Other songs ===
Year	Title	Chart positions		Album
Year	Title	FRA	BEL (Wa)	Album
2012	""Il suffira (d'un signe)" (Merwan Rim, Amaury Vassili, Baptiste Giabiconi & Dumè)	—	—	Génération Goldman

== Filmography ==
=== Films ===
- 2011: The Tale of a Fairy, a short film by Karl Lagerfeld.
- 2013: Once Upon a Time..., in the role of Eduardo Martinez De Hoz in a short by Karl Lagerfeld
- 2015: Nos chers voisins, a TV series in the role of Enzo in the episode "Fêtent la nouvelle année"

=== Television ===
- 2012: Mère et Fille, une series on Disney Channel
- 2014: Scènes de ménages, as a plumber in the episode "Tenue correcte exigée"

=== Streaming ===
- 2023: The Mysterious Mr. Lagerfeld, a documentary by Michael Waldman
