= Oxygen (Baptiste Giabiconi album) =

Studio album by Baptiste Giabiconi
- Released: September 24, 2012
- Recorded: 2011–2012
- Genre: Pop
- Label: My Major Company

Baptiste Giabiconi chronology
Oxygen (2012)	Un homme libre (2014)

Singles from Oxygen
- 1. "One Night In Paradise" Released: 2012; 2. "Speed of light (L'amour et les étoiles)" Released: 2012

Oxygen is the debut album from French male model and singer Baptiste Giabiconi. It was released on 24 September 2012 on the My Major Company fan-supported record label. The album is in English except for the track "Speed of Light (L'amour et les étoiles)", which is bilingual with some additional French lyrics. It was produced by Pete Boxta Martin and recorded in London. It went straight into #1 on the SNEP official French Albums Chart dated 30 September 2012.

== Track listing ==
1. "One Night in Paradise" (3:31)
2. "Unfixable" (feat. J2K) (3:24
3. "Oxygen" (4:05)
4. "Sliding Doors" (3:41)
5. "Speed of Light (L'amour et les étoiles)" (3:29)
6. "Tomorrow" (4:00)
7. "Lightyear" (3:57)
8. "In the Middle of Nowhere" (3:44)
9. "Bring Me Some Flowers" (3:20)
10. "Nobody Told Me" (4:22)
11. "This Ain't Love" (feat. Tania Foster) (3:47)
12. "New York" (3:16)
13. "China Girl" (feat. Master Shortie) (3:32)

New edition bonus tracks

- 14. "One Night in Paradise" (acoustic version) (3:30)
- 15. "One Night In Paradise" (Hakimakli remix) (3:19)
- 16. "Là-bas" (Baptiste Giabiconi & Marie-Mai) (4:24)

== Charts ==
Chart (2012)	Peak position
Ultratop Belgian Albums Chart	171
SNEP French Albums Chart	1
