= Pany =

Pany may refer to:

== People ==
- Irma Pany (born 1988), Cameroonian singer-songwriter
- Pany Yathotou, Laotian politician
- Pany Varela, Portuguese futsal player
- Rudra Narayan Pany (born 1959), Indian politician

== Places ==
- Pany, Perm Krai, village in Russia
- a section of the village of Luzein in Switzerland
