= Danse (song) =

Single by Grégoire

from the album Le Même Soleil
- Released: September 2010
- Recorded: 2009–2010
- Genre: Pop
- Length: 2:56
- Label: My Major Company
- Songwriter(s): Grégoire Boissenot
- Producer(s): Franck Authié

Grégoire singles chronology
"Nuages" (2009)	"Danse" (2010)	"Soleil" (2011)

"Danse" (English: "Dance") is a 2010 song recorded by French singer-songwriter Grégoire and produced by Franck Authié under My Major Company label. It was the first single from his second album Le Même Soleil and was released in September 2010.

== Charts ==
Chart (2010)	Peak position
Belgian (Wallonia) Singles Chart	18
French Digital Chart	19
