= Le Même Soleil =

Studio album by Grégoire
- Released: 15 November 2010
- Recorded: 2009–2010
- Genre: Pop
- Label: My Major Company, Warner Music France
- Producer: Franck Authié

Grégoire chronology
Toi + Moi (2008)	Le Même Soleil (2010)	Les Roses de Mon Silence (2013)

Singles from Le Même Soleil
- 1. "Danse" Released: October 2010; 2. "La Promesse" Released: November 2010; 3. "Soleil" Released: January 2011; 4. "On s'envolera" Released: November 2011

Le Même Soleil (English: The Same Sun), is a 2010 album recorded by French singer Grégoire. It provided four singles : Danse, Soleil, La Promesse, a duet with Jean-Jacques Goldman and On s'envolera. The album entered the French Physical Chart at number one, selling about 23,600 units, then dropped and fell off the top ten after four weeks.

== Track listing ==
All tracks written by Grégoire Boissenot.

No.	Title	Length
1.	"Tu me manques"	3:17
2.	"Soleil"	2:53
3.	"La Promesse"	3:33
4.	"Je laisse"	3:30
5.	"Danse"	2:51
6.	"Mon repère"	3:10
7.	"J'avance"	2:52
8.	"J'adore"	3:13
9.	"Timide"	2:52
10.	"Mon enfant"	2:41
11.	"On s'envolera"	2:58

== Charts ==
=== Weekly charts ===
Chart (2010)	Peak position
Belgian Albums (Ultratop Wallonia)	6
French Albums (SNEP)	1
Swiss Albums (Schweizer Hitparade)	14

=== Year-end charts ===
Chart (2010)	Position
French Albums (SNEP)	22

Chart (2011)	Position
Belgian Albums (Ultratop Wallonia)	21
French Albums (SNEP)	36
