= Letter to the Lord =

Studio album by Irma
- Released: February 2011
- Label: My Major Company

Irma chronology
Letter to the Lord (2011)	Faces (2014)

Letter to the Lord is the debut studio album by a France-based, Cameroonian singer-songwriter Irma. It was released in February 2011 through My Major Company, and was certified Platinum in France a year later.

== Track listing ==
No.	Title	Length
1.	"Letter to the Lord"	3:03
2.	"I Know"	3:01
3.	"Their Truth"	2:56
4.	"End of the Story"	3:05
5.	"Everybody"	3:08
6.	"Watching Crap on TV"	3:12
7.	"Every Smile"	3:48
8.	"In Love With the Devil"	3:05
9.	"Your Guide"	3:08
10.	"Love You"	2:52
11.	"Mr Love"	3:51
12.	"Somehow"	4:24

Edition Collector bonus tracks
No.	Title	Length
13.	"Arum Lily"	3:17
14.	"That Line"	3:41
15.	"First of September"	2:57
16.	"Letter to the Lord" (Piano Version)	3:53
17.	"I Try"	3:22
18.	"Hey Ya" (Duet with Tété)	3:47
19.	"Times They Are a Changin" (Duet with Patrice)	3:25
20.	"My Friend"	2:18

== Charts and certifications ==
=== Weekly charts ===
Chart (2011)	Peak position
Belgian Albums (Ultratop Wallonia)	18
French Albums (SNEP)	6
Swiss Albums (Schweizer Hitparade)	46

=== Certifications ===
Region	Certification	Certified units/sales
France (SNEP)	Platinum	100,000^{*}
^{*} Sales figures based on certification alone.
