= Les Roses de Mon Silence =

Studio album by Grégoire
- Released: September 2013
- Recorded: 2012–2013
- Genre: Pop
- Label: My Major Company, Warner Music France

Grégoire chronology
Le Même Soleil (2010)	Les Roses de Mon Silence (2013)	Poesies de notre enfance (2015)

Singles from Les Roses de Mon Silence
- 1. "Les Roses de Mon Silence" Released: June 2013; 2. "La Promesse" Released: September 2010

Les Roses de Mon Silence (English: The Roses of My Silence), is a 2013 album recorded by French singer-songwriter Grégoire. Les Roses de Mon Silence is Grégoire's third album.

== Track listing ==
All tracks written by Grégoire Boissenot.

No.	Title	Length
1.	"Les roses de mon silence"	2:36
2.	"C'est pas l'enfer"	2:31
3.	"Réveille"	3:04
4.	"Si tu me voyais"	2:57
5.	"Viens avec moi"	3:14
6.	"En souvenir de nous"	2:58
7.	"Elle est"	2:37
8.	"Capricieuse"	2:54
9.	"La plus belle maman"	2:27
10.	"Dis-moi"	3:15
11.	"Coup du sort"	2:42
12.	"Variations"	3:16
13.	"Je reviendrai te chercher"	4:12
14.	"Lève-toi"	4:04
15.	"Tu ne me manques pas"	3:24
16.	"L'enfance"	2:36
17.	"Si parfois"	2:12

== Charts ==
=== Weekly charts ===
Chart (2013)	Peak position
Belgian Albums (Ultratop Flanders)	102
Belgian Albums (Ultratop Wallonia)	3
French Albums (SNEP)	2
Swiss Albums (Schweizer Hitparade)	16

=== Year-end charts ===
Chart (2013)	Position
Belgian Albums (Ultratop Wallonia)	86
French Albums (SNEP)	83

Chart (2014)	Position
Belgian Albums (Ultratop Wallonia)	120
French Albums (SNEP)	159
