= Una parte di me =

Una parte di me may refer to:

- Una parte di me (Nek album), 2005 album by Italian singer-songwriter Nek
  - "Una parte di me" (Nek song), title track from the above album
- Una parte di me (Amaury Vassili album), 2012 album by French singer Amaury Vassili
  - "Una parte di me" (Amaury Vassili song), title track from the above album

== See also ==
- "Sei parte di me", song by Zero Assoluto
