= Vincerò (disambiguation) =

Vincerò (Italian pronunciation: [vintʃeˈrɔ]; "I will be victorious", "I will win") is the concluding cry of the aria "Nessun dorma" from Puccini's opera Turandot.

Vincerò may also refer to:

- Vincerò (album), an album by Amaury Vassili, or the title song
- Vincerò (song), a song by Annalisa from the album Splende (2015)
- Vincerò, greatest hits compilation album by Luciano Pavarotti
- "Vincerò", a song by Fredrik Kempe (2002)
- "Vincerò", a song and EP by Norimasa Fujisawa (2008)
- "Vincerò, Perderò", a song by Mario Frangoulis
