= Un homme libre =

Un homme libre (French for A free man) may refer to:

== Film and television ==
- Un homme libre (1921 film), French title of American western film The Big Punch directed by John Ford
- Un homme libre (1973 film), with Gilbert Bécaud and Olga Georges-Picot directed by Roberto Muller
- Un homme libre, Andreï Sakharov, a 2009 documentary film by Iosif Pasternak about Andrei Sakharov

== Literature ==
- Un homme libre, novel by Maurice Barrès 1889
- Un homme libre, book by Philippe Bouvard 1995

== Music ==
- Un homme libre (album) Baptiste Giabiconi 2014
- "Un homme libre", single by David Hallyday 2002
- "Un homme libre", single by Marie Myriam R. Carlos, E. Carlos, C. Level 1979
- "Un homme libre", single, theme song from the 1973 film Un homme libre, sung by Gilles Marchal composed by Francis Lai with lyrics by Catherine Desage, Pathé 1973
