= Faces (Irma album) =

Studio album by Irma
- Released: 2 June 2014
- Label: My Major Company

Irma chronology
Letter to the Lord (2011)	Faces (2014)

Faces is the second studio album by the France-based, Cameroonian singer-songwriter Irma. It was recorded at Jungle City Studios in New York City and released on 2 June 2014. The album has charted in France, Switzerland and Belgium.

== Track listing ==
No.	Title	Length
1.	"Hear Me Out"	3:46
2.	"Save Me"	3:25
3.	"Catch the Wind"	5:07
4.	"Street Lights"	3:21
5.	"Where Do You Go"	4:37
6.	"It Ain't Easy"	4:45
7.	"Everything Comes and Goes"	3:38
8.	"Trouble Maker"	3:59
9.	"Love Me"	3:26
10.	"What Are You Trying to Do" (Interlude)	2:45
11.	"Train"	4:36
12.	"Unconditional"	5:18
13.	"Hear Me Out" (Acoustic Version)	3:08

== Charts ==
Chart (2014)	Peak position
Belgian Albums (Ultratop Wallonia)	68
French Albums (SNEP)	17
Swiss Albums (Schweizer Hitparade)	27
