= Entre gris clair et gris foncé =

Studio album by Jean-Jacques Goldman
- Released: November 1987
- Recorded: 1987: Studio Gang; Studio RRR la Vaucouleur
- Genres: Pop, Rock, Synthpop
- Length: 83:54
- Label: Epic
- Producers: Jean-Jacques Goldman, Marc Lumbroso

Jean-Jacques Goldman chronology
En public (1986)	Entre gris clair et gris foncé (1987)	Traces (1989)

Singles from Non homologué
- 1. "Elle a fait un bébé toute seule" Released: 1987; 2. "Là-bas" Released: 1987; 3. "C'est ta chance" Released: 1988; 4. "Puisque tu pars" Released: 1988

Professional ratings
Review scores
Source	Rating
Allmusic	3/5 stars

Entre gris clair et gris foncé is a 1987 double album recorded by French artist Jean-Jacques Goldman. It was his fifth studio album and was released in November 1987. It provided four successful singles: "Elle a fait un bébé toute seule" (#4), "Là-bas" (#2), "C'est ta chance" (#16) and "Puisque tu pars" (#3). The album was also very successful.

== Background and release ==
The first nine songs are new compositions. The other eleven songs were written years before. Goldman always wrote one or two songs for each album that either didn't fit the mood of the record or that were too personal. When he started becoming popular, he thought it would be a good opportunity to release some previously unheard songs.

While preparing this album, the new songs were tracked in the studio. The old songs were either recorded live or were recorded using only acoustic instruments.

For the album's first CD release, two songs were omitted ("Tout Petit Monde" and "Il Me Restera") due to time limitations on a compact disc. The 2000 version contained the original LP track listing, this time spread out on two CDs. The first CD contains "new" songs, while the second disc contains eleven previously unreleased songs.

== Commercial success ==
The album entered the French SNEP Albums Chart atop and stayed here for 18 consecutive weeks and 78 in the top 50. It was certified diamond for a million copies in France.

== Track listing ==
All tracks written, composed and performed by Goldman (except "Là-bas", performed as a duet with Sirima).

=== Original release ===
Cassette / Vinyl / CD

1. "À quoi tu sers ?" – 5:29
2. "Il changeait la vie" – 3:50
3. "Là-bas" (duet with Sirima) – 5:46
4. "Entre gris clair et gris foncé" – 3:59
5. "C'est ta chance" – 4:26
6. "Puisque tu pars" – 7:20
7. "Des bouts de moi" – 4:40
8. "Fais des bébés" – 4:04
9. "Filles faciles" – 3:44
10. "Je commence demain" – 2:42
11. "Elle a fait un bébé toute seule" – 3:47
12. "Quelque part, quelqu'un" – 4:22
13. "Qu'elle soit elle" – 1:47
14. "Doux" – 3:53
15. "Reprendre c'est voler" – 2:48
16. "Il y a" – 3:37
17. "Peur de rien blues" – 5:20
18. "Appartenir" – 2:22

=== 2000s release ===
==== Disc 1 ====
1. "À quoi tu sers ?" – 5:30
2. "Il changeait la vie" – 3:59
3. "Tout petit monde" – 3:30
4. "Entre gris clair et gris foncé" – 4:01
5. "Là-bas" (duet with Sirima) – 5:40
6. "C'est ta chance" – 5:09
7. "Des bouts de moi" – 5:05
8. "Fais des bébés" – 4:03
9. "Puisque tu pars" – 7:35

==== Disc 2 ====
1. "Filles faciles" – 3:45
2. "Je commence demain" – 2:48
3. "Elle a fait un bébé toute seule" – 3:54
4. "Quelque part, quelqu'un" – 4:48
5. "Qu'elle soit elle" – 1:54
6. "Doux" – 3:55
7. "Reprendre c'est voler" – 2:50
8. "Il y a" – 3:39
9. "Peur de rien blues" – 6:19
10. "Il me restera" – 3:14
11. "Appartenir" – 2:24

=== Japan release ===
Japanese edition of the album, released in 1989 and contains thirteen tracks, five of which are from Non homologué.

1. "(Intro) A quoi tu sers ?" – 5:29
2. "Il changeait la vie" – 3:59
3. "Là-bas" – 5:40
4. "Entre gris clair et gris foncé" – 4:00
5. "C'est ta chance" – 5:08
6. "Puisque tu pars" – 7:35
7. "Des bouts de moi" – 5:05
8. "Fais des bébés" – 4:03
9. "Je te donne" – 4:25
10. "Famille" – 5:33
11. "La vie par procuration" – 4:13
12. "Parler d'ma vie" – 5:08
13. "Pas toi" — 5:31

== Personnel ==
- Claude Samard – banjo, bottleneck guitar, guitar, dobro
- Guy Delacroix – bass, programming, bass synthesizer, keyboards
- Claude Le Péron – bass
- Clément Bailly, Christophe Deschamps, Jean-François Gauthier – drum kit
- Joe Hammer – drum kit, acoustic drum kit, Fairlight
- Roland Romanelli – synthesizers, keyboards
- Sirima – vocals
- G & M Costa, Sorj Chalandon, Carole Fredericks, Caroline Goldman, Catherine Goldman, Dorothée Goldman, Evelyne Goldman, Michael Goldman, Patricia Goldman, Robert Goldman – chorus
- Jean-Jacques Goldman – keyboards, chorus, guitar, piano, synthesizers, arrangements, producer
- Marc Lumbroso – chorus, producer
- Michael Jones – chorus, guitars
- Gérard Kawcynski, Basile Leroux, Patrice Tison – guitars
- Philippe Grandvoinet – Hammond B3, piano
- Jean-Jacques Milteau – harmonica
- Patrick Bourgoin, Prof Pinpin – saxophone
- Patrice Blanchard, Patrice Mondon – violins

Technical

- Cathy Steinberg – design
- Claude Gassian – photography
- Olivier do Espirito Santo, Jean-Pierre Janiaud, Andy Scott – sound engineers

== Charts, certifications and sales ==
Chart (1987)	Peak position
French SNEP Albums Chart	1

Region	Certification	Certified units/sales
France (SNEP)	Diamond	1,000,000^{*}
^{*} Sales figures based on certification alone.
