= Grégoire (musician) =

French singer-songwriter and composer (born 1979)

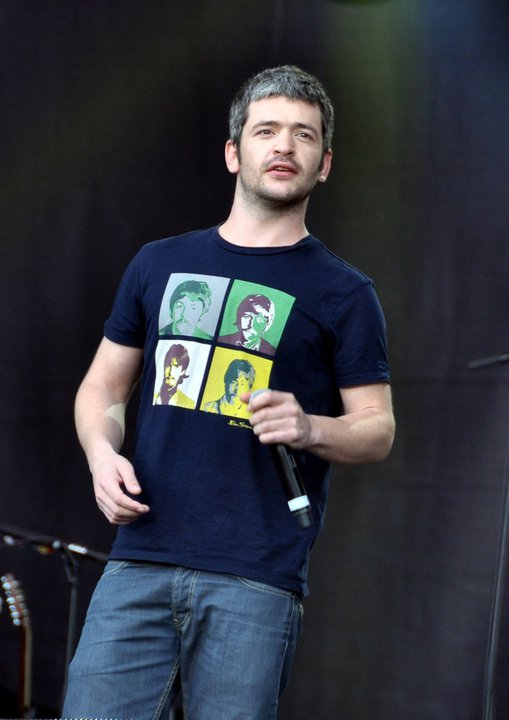
- Grégoire at the "Concert pour l'égalité" on 14 July 2011

Background information
- Born: Grégoire Boissenot; 3 April 1979 (age 46)
- Origin: Senlis, France
- Genres: Pop
- Occupation(s): Singer, songwriter
- Years active: 2008–present
- Labels: My Major Company; Warner Music France
- Website: Official site

Grégoire (French pronunciation: [ɡʁeɡwaʁ]; born Grégoire Boissenot [- bwasno], 3 April 1979) is a French singer-songwriter and composer. He has released three albums to date and has had a number of successful singles in France, Belgium and Switzerland.

== Career ==
In December 2007 Gregoire signed a contract with the young label My Major Company, which gives subscribers the possibility of becoming music producers. Grégoire's first album was produced by 347 producers, forty of whom feature in the music video of his first single, "Toi + Moi". The song was subsequently played on NRJ and RTL radio stations and became a hit in Belgium and Switzerland and in the French digital chart.

In 2008 Grégoire was nominated at the NRJ Music Awards in the category 'French revelation of the year'. A second single, "Rue des Étoiles", was played on the radio in November 2008 and was released in December, then a third single, "Ta Main", the video for which was shot in March 2009 with the actress Inès Sastre. In September 2009 a fourth single, "Nuages", was broadcast. The music video was broadcast on television but the song was only available digitally.

== Personal life ==
Grégoire had four brothers. As indicated in the music video, the song "Ta Main" was dedicated to Ludovic (1969–2002) and Nicolas (1974–2007), his two deceased brothers. Grégoire has a degree in Applied Languages (LEA) English and German.

== Philanthropy ==
Grégoire has been a member of the Les Enfoirés charity ensemble since 2010.

== Discography ==
=== Albums ===

Year	Album	Information	Charts				
Year	Album	Information	FR	FR (DD)	BEL (FL)	BEL (WA)	SWI
2008	Toi + Moi	* First studio album * Date of release : 2008	1	1	—	5	18
2010	Le Même Soleil	* Second studio album * Date of release : 2010	1	2	—	6	14
2013	Les Roses de Mon Silence	* Third studio album * Date of release : 2013	2	4	102	3	16
2015	Poésies de notre enfance	* Fourth studio album * Date of release : 2015	5		—	59	61
2017	À écouter d'urgence	* Fifth studio album * Date of release : 2017	48	—	—	66	—
2022	Live au Studio 1719	* First live album * Date of release : 2022	—	—	—	57	—
2024	Vivre	* Sixth studio album * Date of release: 26 January 2024	—	—	—	98	—

=== Singles ===
Year	Single	Charts					Album
Year	Single	FR	FR (DL)	BEL (Vl)	BEL (WA)	SWI	Album
2008	"Toi + Moi"	87	1	70*	1	9	Toi + Moi
2008	"Rue des Étoiles"	—	15	—	8	59	Toi + Moi
2009	"Ta Main"	172	12	—	51*	—	Toi + Moi
2009	"Nuages"	—	—	—	60*	—	Toi + Moi
2010	"Danse"	60	19	—	18	—	Le Même Soleil
2011	"Soleil"	43	—	—	30	—	Le Même Soleil
2011	"La Promesse" (duo with Jean-Jacques Goldman)	—	—	—	22	—	Le Même Soleil
2013	"Si tu me voyais"	102	—	—	55*	—	Les Roses de Mon Silence
2013	"Les roses de mon silence"	121	—	—	—	—	Les Roses de Mon Silence
2014	"Coup du sort"	111	—	—	—	—	Les Roses de Mon Silence
2017	"C'est quand ?"	102	—	—	—	—	
2020	«à vous à nous»	-	-	-	-	-	

(Did not appear in Ultratop main chart, but in "bubbling under" Ultratip charts. Position in table reflects position in Ultratip plus 50 positions added)

Collaboration singles

Year	Single	Charts			Album
Year	Single	FR	BEL (WA)	SWI	Album
2010	"Parce que c'est toi" (Grégoire / Zazie / Bruel / St-Pier)	–	30	–	
