= Ivyrise =

British rock band

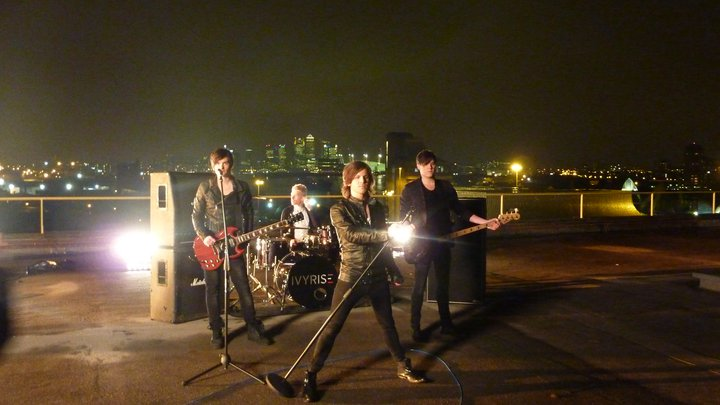
- Ivyrise (2009)

Background information
- Origin: London, England
- Genres: Alternative rock, pop rock
- Years active: 2009 –
- Labels: Warner Music Group; Sony ATV Music Publishing
- Members: Ben Falinski; Dan Tanner; Mark Nagle; Josh Thaxton-Key
- Website: www.ivyrise.com

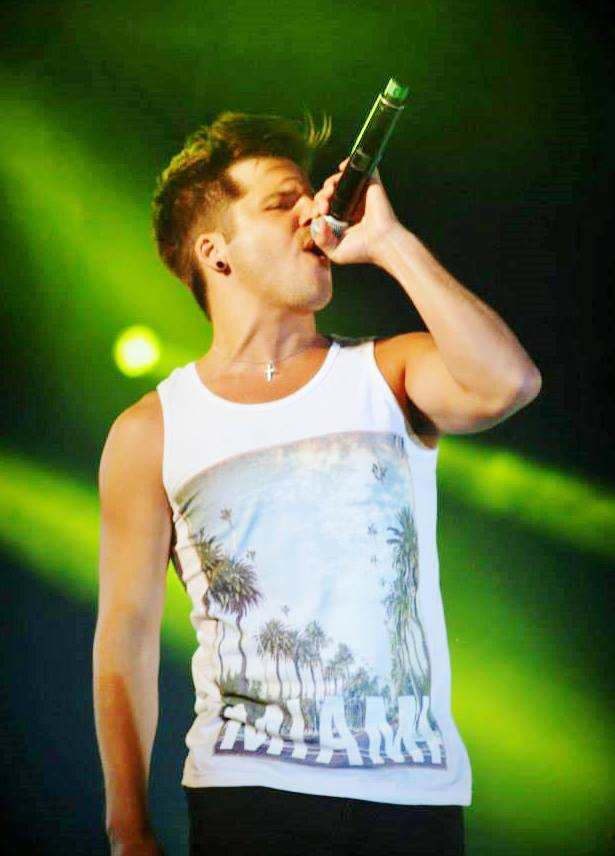
Ivyrise lead singer Ben Falinski performing in Rennes, France in 2017

Ivyrise are a British rock band originating in Portsmouth, England formed by Ben Falinski in 2009.

== Career ==
Ivyrise was formed in 2009 by singer and songwriter Ben Falinski. and toured the UK as main support for Kula Shaker before working with producer Paul Simm in London. Since then, Ivyrise has worked on albums with alternative rock producer Alan Moulder, famed for his work with The Killers, Nine Inch Nails and Billy Corgan from The Smashing Pumpkins, and A lead singer Jason Perry.

On 28 April 2011, Ivyrise's self released debut album entered the BBC Radio 1 Independent Chart at #5 in the UK. The lead single also entered both the HMV and 7 Digital Top 20 Bestsellers List during its first week of release. Ivyrise won a competition run by thelondonpaper to support Bon Jovi on the Lost Highway Tour, opening for Bon Jovi at Twickenham Stadium. The band's second independent release entered the BBC Radio 1 Independent Chart in the UK at #2. The single was remixed by Jason Nevins.

After signing a record deal in Europe with Warner Music Group in 2012, Ivyrise went to Sonic Ranch in El Paso, Texas, to work with producer Jason Perry to record the self-titled album Ivyrise. The mastering was done in Nashville, Tennessee. The album was certified gold in France, Belgium and Switzerland in 2016.

Ivyrise released their second album in 2015 and toured the UK and Europe as main support for British band McFly on their Keep Calm And Play Louder Tour. The album featured the #1 single 'Je Te Donne' and was certified diamond in France, Belgium, Switzerland and Canada with sales in excess of 1,000,000 units. Both singles from the album received heavy rotation across Francophone territories, peaking at #3 on the overall radio airplay chart SNEP in late 2017.

Ivyrise released a special bilingual English/French version of the single "Line Up The Stars" featuring Swiss singer Dania Giò. The single was released in France and other francophone markets. This version peaked at #9 in the French official singles chart and #7 in the Belgian Ultratop charts.

== Members ==
- Ben Falinski – lead vocals, piano
- Dan Tanner – lead guitar, vocals
- Mark Nagle – bass guitar
- Josh Thaxton-Key – drums

== In popular culture ==
In October 2014, Ivyrise recorded the Jean-Jacques Goldman hit "Je te donne" with Ben Falinski appearing in duo with Leslie Bourgouin. The bilingual French/English song is featured on the album Génération Goldman, which was released in France on 19 November 2014 and went immediately to #1 in France, Belgium, Switzerland and Quebec, being certified a diamond album with sales in excess of 500,000 within the first month of release. The album has sold over 2.4 million copies worldwide as of August 2019.

Ivyrise were the sole British act on the album with Ben Falinski interpreting the bilingual French / English song co-written by Jean-Jacques Goldman and Michael Jones. The track has charted in SNEP, the official French Singles Chart reaching #1. A music video was also prepared for the single which has received in excess of 33 million views on YouTube as of February 2020.

In 2019, it was announced that the band was on hiatus and that lead singer Ben Falinski was recording solo material.

On 1 September 2019 Ben Falinski announced the release of the single "Hold on To Me" which featured vocals from Swiss singer Dania Gio. The single received airplay across the Francophone world, peaking at #11 in Quebec, Canada.

Lead singer Ben Falinski announced the release of his first solo album "Singing into The Black Smoke" in June 2020. The album features the singles "Flying Over New York City" "I Need You More" and "There For Each Other" and was recorded in Portsmouth during the COVID-19 global pandemic lockdown. The album was commercially released on 22 June 2020 and charted at #36 in Canada and #32 in Belgium in its first week of release.

== Discography ==
=== Albums ===
List of singles, with selected chart positions
Title
Details
Peak chart positions
Notes
UK
Ivyrise
- Released: 19 November 2013
- Label: Warner Music Group
- Formats: CD, digital download
–

No.	Title	Length
1.	"Line Up the Stars (French Edit)" (featuring Dania Giò)	3:20
2.	"Hurts"	4:24
3.	"Too Much"	3:27
4.	"Yes to Running"	3:14
5.	"Je te donne" (feat. Leslie)	3:20
6.	"Looks Like Heaven"	3:44
7.	"You Know Me"	4:22
8.	"El Paso"	4:19
9.	"Only the Night"	4:33
10.	"Run from You"	3:18
11.	"Last Words"	3:30
12.	"With You Til the End"	3:37
13.	"Scars"	4:43
14.	"Line Up the Stars"	3:10

=== Singles ===
Year	Single	Peak positions			Album
Year	Single	UK	BEL (Wa)	FRA	Album
2010	"Disguise"	–	–	–	
2010	"Tips"	–	–	–	
2010	"1000 Feet"	–	–	–	
2011	"Line Up the Stars"	–	–	–	Ivyrise
2011	"Yes to Running "	–	–	–	Ivyrise
2012	"Line Up the Stars" (feat. Dania Giò ) Special release in France and francophone markets	–	–	9	Ivyrise
2012	"Je te donne" (with Leslie	–	3* (Ultratip)	1	Génération Goldman

*Did not appear in the official Belgian Ultratop 50 charts, but rather in the bubbling under Ultratip charts.
