= Sirima =

- Born: Sirima Nicole Wiratunga; 14 February 1964
- Origin: Isleworth, Middlesex
- Died: 7 December 1989 (aged 25)
- Genre: Pop music
- Occupation: Singer
- Years active: 1987–1989
- Website: www.sirima.net

Sirima Nicole Wiratunga (14 February 1964 – 7 December 1989), known simply by her first name Sirima, was a singer who sang in English and French. She was primarily known for her duet "Là-bas", recorded in 1987 with Jean-Jacques Goldman, which was a number two hit in France.

== Early life ==
Sirima Nicole Wiratunga was born in Isleworth in County Middlesex on 14 February 1964, of a French mother and a Sri Lankan father (Charles Ranjit Wiratunga). She was named after Sirīmā (meaning Sweet Mother), one of the great disciples of Siddhattha Gotama the Buddha.

Her family returned to Sri Lanka when Sirima was younger, along with her sister and brother.They lived in Gampaha. Sirima attended the nursery of Holy Cross College, one of the leading Catholic schools in Gampaha.

She displayed her talents in music from the first grade and she was often asked to sing for the class by the teacher. She went on to display her talents further by singing Baila and popular Sri Lankan music at various events, Buddhist festivals and in the church singing Catholic Hymns.

At the age of 8, her parents separated and the mother returned to England with her three Children.

== Career ==
Influenced by her father’s guitar, Sirima became interested in music and started playing many instruments: guitar, violin, piano accordion and percussion. She took a keen interest in English Pop music and musicals, and formed a folk group with her sister.

At 18, Sirima moved to France and started working as an au pair. From 1982 to 1987, she was busking in the Paris Metro, at the Châtelet - Les Halles station.

Sirima was recognized for her talent by many people during this time, and started receiving offers for professional engagements. However, she preferred busking in the Metro.

During this period the music producer and saxophonist Philippe Delettrez discovered her. At the same time, songwriter Jean-Jacques Goldman (who later in the 1990s has written many songs for Celine Dion) was looking for a female voice for a song, and Sirima was introduced to Goldman by Delettrez, resulting in the duet "Là-Bas" which went on to become a hit.

Sirima started receiving professional offers again after the success of Là-Bas, but decided to remain independent and continued to busk in the Metro.

In 1988, Sirima and Delettrez started working on Sirima’s first album and released "... A Part of Me" on 17 November 1989. Sirima designed the cover of the album herself and wrote her own scripts for the videos.

== Death ==
On 7 December 1989, just three weeks after releasing her first album, Sirima’s partner musician Kahatra Sasorith stabbed her to death with a kitchen knife, leaving behind her son Kym. He had feared that someday she might leave him and marry someone else, and killed her out of jealousy. He was later sentenced to 9 years in prison.

== Discography ==
1987: Jean-Jacques Goldman - Entre gris clair et gris foncé

3. Là-Bas (duet with Jean-Jacques Goldman)

1989: ...A part of me

1. Sometimes love isn't enough
2. No reason no rhyme
3. His way of loving me
4. Kym
5. A part of me
6. I need to know (duet with Jean-Jacques Goldman)
7. Ticket to the Moon
8. I believed
9. Daddy
10. Was it a dream?
