= Rue des Étoiles =

Single by Grégoire

from the album Toi + Moi
- Released: February 2009
- Recorded: 2008
- Genre: AC, Contemporary Chanson
- Length: 3:49
- Label: My Major Company
- Songwriter(s): Grégoire Boissenot
- Producer(s): Franck Authié

Grégoire singles chronology
"Toi + Moi" (2008)	"Rue des Étoiles" (2009)	"Ta Main" (2009)

"Rue des Étoiles" (English: "Stars Street") is a 2009 song recorded by French singer-songwriter Grégoire and produced by Franck Authié under My Major Company label. It was the second single from his debut album Toi + Moi and was released in February 2009. The song became a top ten hit in Belgium (Wallonia), and achieved minor success in Switzerland. It was heavily played in Russia.

== Charts ==
=== Weekly charts ===
Weekly chart performance for "Rue des Étoiles"
Chart (2009)	Peak position
Belgium (Ultratop 50 Wallonia)	8
French Digital Chart	15
Russia Airplay (TopHit)	35
Switzerland (Schweizer Hitparade)	59

=== Year-end charts ===
2009 year-end chart performance for "Rue des Étoiles"
Chart (2009)	Position
Russia Airplay (TopHit)	73

2010 year-end chart performance for "Rue des Étoiles"
Chart (2010)	Position
Russia Airplay (TopHit)	199
