= La vie par procuration =

Single by Jean-Jacques Goldman

from the album Non homologué
- Released: 1986
- Recorded: 1986
- Length: 3:59
- Label: Epic Records
- Songwriter: Jean-Jacques Goldman (lyrics/music)
- Producers: Jean-Jacques Goldman; Marc Lumbroso

Jean-Jacques Goldman singles chronology
"Pas toi" (1986)	"La vie par procuration" (1986)	"Elle a fait un bébé toute seule" (1987)

"La vie par procuration" is a song by Jean-Jacques Goldman which became a hit single in 1986. It was recorded originally for the album Non homologué that was released in 1985. However it was a live version of the recording during a concert and made available through the live Jean-Jacques Goldman album En public that became a commercial hit, staying 21 weeks in the French Singles Chart making it to number 2 in December 1986. It was certified gold in 1987 with reported 500,000 copies sold.

== Personnel ==
- Michael Jones - Guitar, backing vocals
- Claude Le Péron - Bass, backing vocals
- Jean-François Gauthier - drums, backing vocals
- Lance Dixon, Philippe Grandvoinet - Synthesizer, backing vocals
- Prof Pinpin - Saxophone, backing vocals
- Andy Scott and Pascale Potrel - mixing
- Marc Lumbroso and Jean-Jacques Goldman - Direction
- Yves Jaget - Recording
- Émile Assier - Photography of cover

== Covers ==
The song is very popular and has been covered and adapted many times.

In 2008, Israeli DJ Offer Nissim released a lengthened remixed version of 8 minutes 35 seconds titled "La Vie Par Procuration (Offer Nissim 08' Reconstruction)". The remix also appears in his album Happy People released on October 28, 2008.

The song was covered by Leslie & Pauline on the 2013 Jean-Jacques Goldman tribute album Génération Goldman Volume 2 and an official music video was also released.

== Charts ==
Jean-Jacques Goldman

Chart (1986–1987)	Peak position
France (SNEP)	2

Leslie & Pauline

Chart (2013)	Peak position
France (SNEP)	146
