= Pas toi =

1986 single by Jean-Jacques Goldman

Single by Jean-Jacques Goldman

from the album Non homologué
- B-side: "Compte pas sur moi"
- Released: April 1986
- Recorded: 1985
- Genre: New wave, progressive rock
- Length: 5:31
- Label: Épic
- Songwriter(s): Jean-Jacques Goldman
- Producer(s): Jean-Jacques Goldman; Marc Lumbroso

Jean-Jacques Goldman singles chronology
"Je te donne" (1985)	"Pas toi" (1986)	"La vie par procuration" (1986)

"Pas toi" is a 1985 song recorded by French singer-songwriter and composer Jean-Jacques Goldman. It was the third and last single of his fourth studio album Non homologué and was released in April 1986. Fully composed by Goldman, it was successful in France.

== Song information ==
The song is available on many albums by Goldman, including his live albums En Public, Du New Morning au Zénith and En passant tournée 1998, and his compilations Entre gris clair et gris foncé, Intégrale, Les Enfoirés à l'Opéra, Singulier 81/89 and Pluriel 90/96. The live version recorded in 1999 was very different from the original and had rap sounds; it also added lyrics in English sung by Michael Jones. The song deals with a non-reciprocal love, and is not autobiographical.

In France, the single started at number 13 on 26 April 1986 and reached a peak of number five for two non-consecutive weeks. It remained for seven weeks in the top ten and 21 weeks in the top 50 and achieved Silver status.

== Cover versions ==
In 1997, the song was covered by French R&B band Melgroove and released as a single, becoming a hit in France and Belgium (Wallonia). This version is very different from the original one as the three voices of the singers are superposed in the chorus. In addition, the original structure of the song was changed since "Pas toi" begins with the chorus.

The song was performed by La troupe des Dix Commandements on French show Tapis rouge, broadcast of France 2 on 3 March 2001. Chorus Meps (1998), Michel Leclerc (2000, piano version) and the Collège de l'Estérel (2002) recorded a new version of the song.

== Track listings ==
7" single

No.	Title	Length
1.	"Pas toi"	3:57
2.	"Compte pas sur moi"	4:40

Digital download (since 2005)

No.	Title	Length
1.	"Pas toi" (album version)	5:31
2.	"Pas toi" (1986 live version)	6:38
3.	"Pas toi" (1999 live version)	7:24

== Charts and sales ==
=== Weekly charts ===
Weekly chart performance for "Pas toi" (by Goldman)
Chart (1986)	Peak position
Europe (European Hot 100)	44
Europe (European Airplay Top 50)	16
France (SNEP)	5
Quebec (ADISQ)	9

Weekly chart performance for "Pas toi" (by Melgroove)
Chart (1997)	Peak position
Belgium (Ultratop 50 Wallonia)	6
France (SNEP)	17
Quebec (ADISQ)	43

=== Year-end charts ===
Year-end chart performance for "Pas toi" (by Goldman)
Chart (1986)	Position
Europe (European Hot 100)	97

Year-end chart performance for "Pas toi" (by Melgroove)
Chart (1997)	Position
Belgium (Ultratop 50 Wallonia)	37
France (SNEP)	66

=== Certifications ===
Certifications for "Pas toi"
Region	Certification	Certified units/sales
France (SNEP)	Silver	125,000^{*}
^{*} Sales figures based on certification alone.
