= Je te donne (song) =

Single by Jean-Jacques Goldman and Michael Jones

from the album Non homologué
- B-side: "Confidentiel"
- Released: 1985
- Recorded: France
- Genre: Pop; Progressive rock
- Length: 4:25
- Label: Epic
- Songwriters: Jean-Jacques Goldman; Michael Jones
- Producers: Jean-Jacques Goldman; Michael Jones

Jean-Jacques Goldman singles chronology
"Je marche seul" (1985)	"Je te donne" (1985)	"Les Restos du cœur" (1986)

"Je te donne" is a bilingual pop song, recorded in English and French. It was performed by Jean-Jacques Goldman and Michael Jones and was released as a single in late 1985. It reached number-one for eight weeks on the French Singles Chart, becoming one of the best-selling singles of the 1980s in France. The song has been covered by Worlds Apart in 1996 and Ivyrise in 2013 and achieved success in many countries where it charted.

== Jean-Jacques Goldman and Michael Jones version ==
=== Track listings ===
7" single

1. "Je te donne" — 4:25
2. "Confidentiel" by Jean-Jacques Goldman — 2:36

=== Charts ===
Chart (1985–1986)	Peak position
Eurochart Hot 100	20
French SNEP Singles Chart	1
Quebec (ADISQ)	4

== Worlds Apart version ==
In 1996, the multi-national boy band World Apart released a successful cover reaching number 3 in France. It was also a charting hit in Germany, Austria, Belgium, Switzerland and Sweden.

"Je te donne"

Single by Worlds Apart

from the album Everybody
- B-side: "Let the Sun Shine Down on You"
- Released: 1996
- Genre: Electronic
- Length: 3:43
- Label: Power Brothers
- Songwriters: Jean-Jacques Goldman; Michael Jones
- Producers: Tee Green; Andy Reynolds

Worlds Apart singles chronology
"Everybody" (1996)	"Je te donne" (1996)	"Just Say I Said Hello" (1996)

=== Track listings ===
CD single

1. "Je te donne" (radio version) — 3:43
2. "Let the Sun Shine Down on You" — 3:47

CD maxi

1. "Je te donne" (radio version) — 3:43
2. "Let the Sun Shine Down on You" — 3:47
3. "Je te donne" (solid noise Montreal mix) — 8:05
4. "Je te donne" (organic technology Belgium mix) — 5:00

=== Charts ===
Chart (1996)	Peak position
Austrian Singles Chart	16
Belgian (Flanders) Singles Chart	35
Belgian (Wallonia) Singles Chart	3
Europe (Eurochart Hot 100)	15
French SNEP Singles Chart	3
German Singles Chart	22
Swedish Singles Chart	16
Swiss Singles Chart	16

=== End of year charts ===
End of year chart (1996)	Position
Europe (Eurochart Hot 100)	62

== Leslie and Ivyrise version ==
"Je te donne"

Single by Leslie & Ivyrise

from the album Génération Goldman
- Released: 2012
- Length: 3:19
- Label: My Major Company / M6 Music label
- Songwriters: Jean-Jacques Goldman; Michael Jones
- Producer: Trak Invaders

French Leslie and British Ivyrise collaborated on a new joint version on the 2012 tribute album Génération Goldman album. The track was produced by Trak Invaders and was released on My Major Company label.

Ben Falinski, the vocalist from Ivyrise who performed mainly on the track says in the promotional video teaser that the song was his most favourite from Jean-Jacques Goldman and was so happy to have the chance to do it.

=== Charts ===
Chart (2012)	Peak position
French SNEP Singles Chart	38
