= Canterò =

Studio album by Amaury Vassili
- Released: 26 November 2010
- Recorded: 2009–2010
- Genre: Operatic pop
- Label: Warner Music France
- Producer: Quentin Bachelet

Amaury Vassili chronology
Vincero (2009)	Canterò (2010)	Una parte di me (2012)

Canterò is the second album by French singer Amaury Vassili. It was released on 26 November 2010. It was followed up by a new edition in 2011 containing his 2011 Eurovision Song Contest hit single "Sognu".

== Track listing ==
No.	Title	Writer(s)	Producer(s)	Length
1.	"Sognu"	Daniel Moyne, Quentin Bachelet	Quentin Bachelet	2:55
2.	"Canterò"	Jean-Felix Lalanne	Quentin Bachelet	3:39
3.	"Maria"	Daniel Moyne, Essaï Altounian	Quentin Bachelet	3:34
4.	"Dietro l'amore"	Toto Cutugno	Quentin Bachelet	4:30
5.	"Caruso"	Lucio Dalla	Quentin Bachelet	5:37
6.	"Io So Che Tu"	Davide Esposito, De Benedittis	Quentin Bachelet	3:46
7.	"Amapola"	Joseph Lacalle	Quentin Bachelet	3:44
8.	"Vorrei Vorrei"	Jean Renard	Quentin Bachelet	3:22
9.	"Il Volo"	Adelmo Fornaciari	Quentin Bachelet	4:36
10.	"Miserere (ft. Davide Esposito)"	Adelmo Fornaciari	Quentin Bachelet	4:19
11.	"D'amore Morirei"	Henrik Janson	Quentin Bachelet	4:03
12.	"Con te partirò"	Francesco Sartori	Quentin Bachelet	4:23
13.	"Nella Fantasia"	Ennio Morricone	Quentin Bachelet	4:30
14.	"Les Moulins de Mon Coeur"	Michel Legrand	Quentin Bachelet	3:35
15.	"Danza Con Me"	Thomas Roussel	Quentin Bachelet	3:10
16.	"Sognu (English Version)"	Daniel Moyne, Quentin Bachelet	Quentin Bachelet	2:55

== Chart performance ==
Chart (2010)	Peak position
Belgian Albums Chart (Wallonia)	18
French Albums Chart	8
Swiss Albums Chart	76

== Release history ==
Version	Region	Date	Label	Format
Original release	France	26 November 2010	Warner Music	CD
Nouvelle édition	France	8 April 2011	Warner Music	CD
