= Sognu =

2011 song by Amaury Vassili

Single by Amaury Vassili

from the album Canterò
- Released: March 4, 2011
- Recorded: 2011
- Genre: Operatic pop
- Label: Warner
- Songwriters: Daniel Moyne; Quentin Bachelet; Jean-Pierre Marcellesi; Julie Miller
- Producer: Quentin Bachelet

Amaury Vassili singles chronology
"Endless Love" (2010)	"Sognu" (2011)

Eurovision Song Contest 2011 entry
- Country: France
- Artist: Amaury Vassili
- Language: Corsican
- Composers: Daniel Moyne, Quentin Bachelet
- Lyricists: Jean-Pierre Marcellesi, Julie Miller

Finals performance
- Final result: 15th
- Final points: 82

Entry chronology
- ◄ "Allez Ola Olé" (2010)
- "Echo (You and I)" (2012) ►

"Sognu" (English: "I Dream") is a song by Amaury Vassili. It represented France in the Eurovision Song Contest 2011. Although it was a favourite to win the contest, it ended up in 15th position.

== Background ==
=== Song selection ===
The song was composed by Daniel Moyne and Quentin Bachelet (son of French singer Pierre Bachelet), who has been working with Vassili since the beginning of his career. The lyrics of "Sognu" were written by Jean-Pierre Marcellesi.

The song was chosen internally by France 3 and SACEM. "Sognu" was sung in the Corsican language, which marks the first French entry in the Eurovision Song Contest sung in Corsican since "Mama Corsica" in 1993.

=== Selection of Vassili ===
Regarding the decision to select Amaury Vassili and "Sognu", Pierre Sled, program supervisor at France 3, declared: "We wanted someone young, representing the excellence of French music. We didn't hesitate much, given the fact that the other names were not satisfying". He pointed out that "the choice was driven by the desire to promote a young talented artist representing the best of French music and its diversity. That's why we quickly agreed an opera singer was the most elegant option. Amaury is an angel of music with a powerful voice. Without any hesitation, he was a perfect choice." The song was presented on 7 March. An English version of "Sognu", called "I Would Dream About Her", was written by UK songwriter Dele Ladimeji.

"Our goal is clear", Pierre Sled assured, "France 3 is the channel of French regions and we wanted to have them honored. Corsican is close to Italian, thus it will perfectly suit an opera song".

== Promotion ==
Vassili appeared on numerous shows, including Le Plus Grand Cabaret Du Monde, 13h00 news, Sidaction, Les Années Bonheur, Morandini. France3 aired a video about the contest, shortly before the Finale. It included visits to the press centre, the arena, and interviews with press and fans. On 29 April, a show called En Route Pour L'Eurovision Avec Amaury was broadcast on France3 on 9 May, five days before the Finale.

Amaury's record label, Warner Music Group, promoted Sognu throughout Europe by signing radio station deals. In addition, Warner Music Europe was preparing a European release of Vasilli's CD, which included "Sognu".

== Music video ==
The official music video premiered on 8 March 2011 on Vassili's official YouTube channel.

== Track listing ==
Digital download
No.	Title	Length
1.	"Sognu"	2:55

== Release history ==
Region	Date	Label	Format
France	4 March 2011	Warner Music	Digital download
France	2 May 2011	Warner Music	CD single

== Charts ==
Chart	Peak position
Belgium (Ultratip Bubbling Under Wallonia)	25
France (SNEP)	33
France (SNEP) Physical chart	3
