= Ta Main =

Single by Grégoire

from the album Toi + Moi
- Released: April 2009
- Recorded: 2008
- Genre: Pop
- Length: 3:34
- Label: My Major Company
- Songwriter: Grégoire Boissenot
- Producer: Franck Authié

Grégoire singles chronology
| "Rue des Étoiles" (2009) | "Ta Main" (2009) | "Nuages" (2009) |

"Ta Main" (English: "Your Hand") is a 2008 song recorded by French singer-songwriter Grégoire and produced by Franck Authié under My Major Company label. It was the third single from his debut album Toi + Moi and was released in April 2009. It became a hit in Belgium, and in France where it was much aired both on radio and on television.

== Background and writing ==
On 2 April 2009, it was publicly revealed that "Ta Main" would be the third single from the album Toi + Moi.

Grégoire explained that the song was improvised one day on piano when the album was recording, and it seemed obvious to producer Franck Authié and himself to include the song in the track listing. As indicated at the end of the video, the song is dedicated to the two deceased brothers of the singer, named Nicolas and Ludovic. About the writing, Grégoire also said:

"Ta Main" was also made to have a double meaning so that a couple can also be appropriated. (...) [People] were saying at first that I had certainly written for a girlfriend but that they took it for their grandfather who had just passed away, a friend died... (...) I had the idea that the song is fairly general and that everyone finds his story. I did not ultimately impose mine and people have themselves taken in the first sense. It's very moving. I learned that this song is much aired at funerals."

"Ta Main" deals with a particularly painful separation as it was not chosen and was provoked by the death. In the lyrics, the singer expresses the fact that we are forced to live without the loved one and accept it somehow, despite the lack which results of this situation.

A CD single promo was sent to stations radio on 20 April 2009. A music video was shot in Brussels and features actress and model Inés Sastre who appears lip-synching the song.

As sign of popularity, the song was included on the notable compilation NRJ Music Awards 2010, and the music video is also available on the third CD of the collector version.

== Reception ==
The single was successful in Belgium (Wallonia). It entered the Ultratip chart at number 30 on 2 May 2009, climbed every week and eventually peaked at number one in the ninth week. In France, the song was much aired on radios, peaking at number two for two consecutive weeks, and remained for 17 weeks in the top 40.

In 2010, the song was covered by Les Enfoirés for their album 2010: Les Enfoirés... la crise de nerfs!. This version was produced by Guy Delacroix and was released as single on 19 April 2010. The verses are sung by Mimie Mathy, Renan Luce, Zazie, Maurane and MC Solaar, and the refrain are performed by all the singers. The single peaked at number 37 on the Belgian (Wallonia) Singles Chart.

== Track listings ==
- CD single – Promo / Digital download

| No. | Title | Length |
|---|---|---|
| 1. | "Ta Main" (single / album version) | 3:34 |

- CD single – Promo ^{1}

| No. | Title | Length |
|---|---|---|
| 1. | "Ta Main" (single version) | 3:42 |

- Digital download ^{1}

| No. | Title | Length |
|---|---|---|
| 1. | "Ta Main" (album version) | 3:55 |

== Charts ==
=== Weekly charts ===
| Chart (2009) | Peak position |
|---|---|
| Belgian (Wallonia) Ultratip Chart | 1 |
| French Airplay Chart | 2 |
| French Digital Chart | 12 |
| Chart (2010)^{1} | Peak position |
| Belgian (Wallonia) Singles Chart | 37 |

^{1} Version by Les Enfoirés

=== Year-end charts ===
| Chart (2009) | Position |
|---|---|
| French Airplay Chart | 23 |
