= Amaury Vassili chante Mike Brant =

2014 tribute album

Studio album by Amaury Vassili
- Released: 27 October 2014; 31 October 2014 (collectors' edition)
- Recorded: 2013–2014
- Genre: Pop
- Label: Warner Music

Amaury Vassili chronology
Una parte di me (2012)	Amaury Vassili chante Mike Brant (00000000)

Amaury Vassili chante Mike Brant is a 2014 tribute album by Amaury Vassili of songs of Israeli singer Mike Brant. The album was set to coincide with the 40th anniversary of Mike Brant's death in 1975 by suicide.

The album was released on Warner Music entering at number 8 in SNEP French Albums Chart in its first week of release. It also charted at number 17 on the Belgian French (Wallonia) Ultratop Albums Chart.

The album was in two formats: An ordinary release and a collectors' edition with additional instrumental tracks of many of the tracks on the first CD.

Vassili released "Laisse-moi t'aimer" as a music video as well. The album contains a "virtual duo" by Vassili and Brant in the track "Qui saura", the opening track on the album.

The album also contains the song "Où que tu sois" composed by Brant but never released by him.

== Track list ==
1. "Qui saura" (Amaury Vassili & Mike Brant) (3:32)
2. "Parce que je t'aime plus que moi" (3:09)
3. "À corps perdu" (3:36)
4. "Dis-lui" (3:21)
5. "C'est comme ça que je t'aime" (3:19)
6. "Rien qu'une larme" (3:34)
7. "Viens ce soir" (3:33)
8. "Mais dans la lumière" (4:22)
9. "Mr Schubert I Love You" (2:53)
10. "Laisse-moi t'aimer" (3:22)
11. "Qui pourra te dire" (2:55)
12. "C'est ma prière" (3:05)
13. "Où que tu sois" (2:59) (an unpublished song composed by Mike Brant)

== Collectors edition ==
CD 1 Exactly the same track list as the original album

CD 2 (instrumental versions):

1. "Laisse-moi t'aimer" (3:24)
2. "Rien qu'une larme" (3:34)
3. "Dis-lui" (3:21)
4. "Qui saura" (3:32)
5. "C'est ma prière" (3:05)
6. "C'est comme ça que je t'aime" (3:21)

== Charts ==
=== Weekly charts ===
Chart (2014–15)	Peak position
Belgian Albums (Ultratop Wallonia)	10
French Albums (SNEP)	7

=== Year-end charts ===
Chart (2014)	Position
Belgian Albums (Ultratop Wallonia)	122
French Albums (SNEP)	67

Chart (2015)	Position
Belgian Albums (Ultratop Wallonia)	54
French Albums (SNEP)	47

== Certifications ==
Region	Certification	Certified units/sales
France (SNEP)	Platinum	100,000^{*}
^{*} Sales figures based on certification alone.
