= Pauline (singer) =

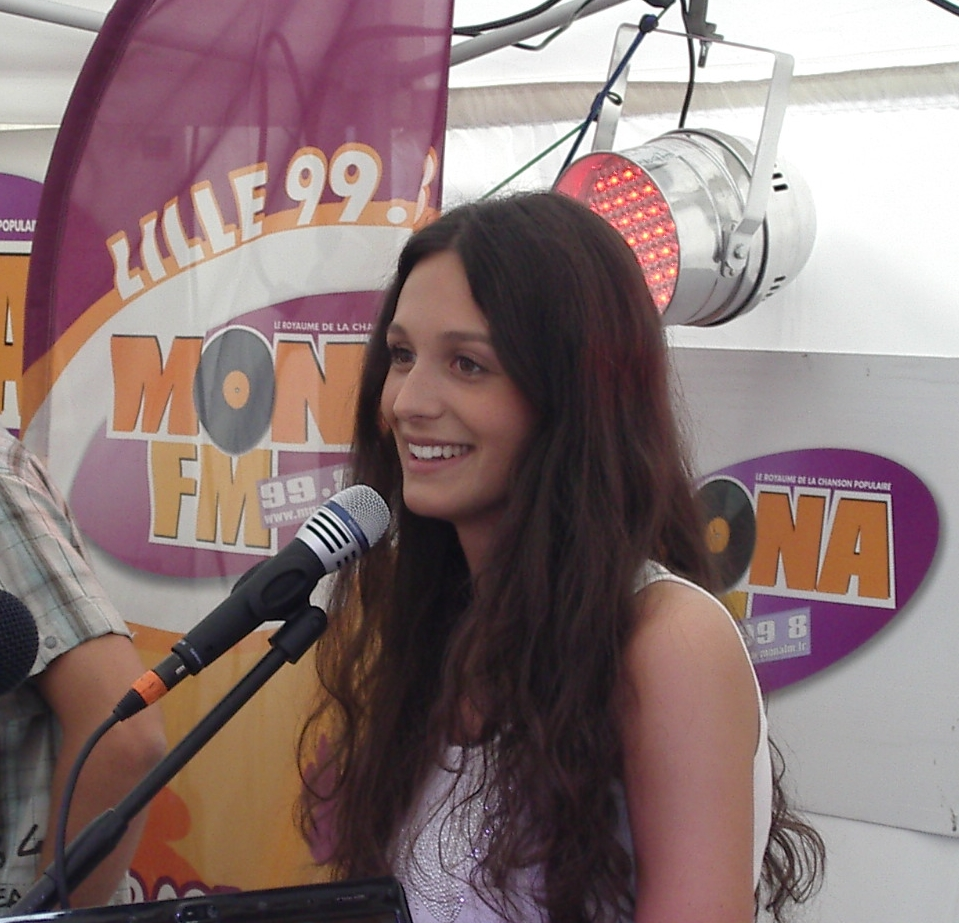

Background information
- Born: Pauline Vasseur; 5 January 1988 (age 38); Lens, Pas-de-Calais
- Origin: France
- Genres: Pop
- Occupations: Singer, composer, songwriter
- Instrument: Piano
- Years active: 2007–present
- Website: www.pauline-officiel.fr

Pauline Vasseur (born 5 January 1988), who performs under the mononym Pauline, is a French composer, songwriter and singer.

== Biography ==
Pauline Vasseur was born 5 January 1988 in Lens, Pas-de-Calais. She began to play the piano at five. When she was 12 years old, she joined the Conservatory of Lille, where the passion of her piano teacher, David Masson, seemed to rub off on her. She then prepared to pass the Diplôme d'études musicales that she obtained at 15. She worked and wrote some texts with Martin Rappeneau, Lena Ka, Jean-Luc Léonardon and François Welgryn. Allô le monde, her first album, was released on 1 October 2007. During the concert on the Champ de Mars on 14 July Pauline, then 19 years, sang her hit "Allô le monde" in front of more than 500,000 people.

== Discography ==
=== Albums ===
List of albums, with selected chart positions and certifications
Title	Release date	Peak positions				Certifications
Title	Release date	FRA	FRA (DD)	BEL (WA)	SWI	Certifications
Allô le monde	1 October 2007	29	8	29	—	SNEP: Gold
La vie du bon côté	31 May 2010	70	—	—	—	
Le meilleur de nous-mêmes	27 May 2013	107	49	—	—	

=== Singles ===
List of singles, with selected chart positions
Title	Year	Peak position				Album
Title	Year	FRA	FRA (DD)	BEL (WA)	SWI	Album
"Allô le monde"	2008	8	7	3	77	Allô le monde
"C'est pas toi qui m'auras"	2008	—	—	—	—	Allô le monde
"Tous les jours"	2010	—	—	—	—	La vie du bon côté
