= Toi + Moi (song) =

Single by Grégoire

from the album Toi + Moi
- Released: September 2008
- Recorded: 2008
- Genre: Pop
- Length: 3:03
- Label: My Major Company
- Songwriter: Grégoire
- Producer: Franck Authié

Grégoire singles chronology
"Toi + Moi" (2008)	"Rue des Étoiles" (2009)

"Toi + Moi" is a 2008 pop song recorded by French singer Grégoire. It was his debut single off his album of the same name and was released in October 2008. It achieved huge success in francophone countries.

== Background and release ==
As the song was produced by 347 Internet users, Grégoire allowed forty of them to appear elsewhere in the music video performing the song in playback. This 3:02 video is available on the DVD of the collector edition. As sign of popularity, the song and the music video were included on the famous double compilation NRJ Music Awards 2009.

The song was quickly aired by the radio NRJ and RTL. With this song, Grégoire was nominated at the 2008 NRJ Music Awards in the category 'French revelation of the year' and performed it on the show in a new version with Sheryfa Luna, Shy'm, Zaho, Natasha St-Pier, Sofia Essaïdi, Nâdiya et Louisy Joseph. "Toi + Moi" was thus included on the NRJ Music Awards 2009 compilation.

In 2009, the song was covered by Maurane, Maxime Le Forestier, Claire Keim, Gérard Darmon, Julie Zenatti, Gérald De Palmas, Liane Foly and Nolwenn Leroy for Les Enfoirés' album Les Enfoirés font leur cinéma. This cover version was ranked number 16 on the Belgian Ultratop 50 Singles Chart on 28 March 2009.

Toi + Moi was also used as the theme song for the 2012 edition of the Québécois musical reality series, Star Académie, sung by the contestants.

== Chart performance ==
"Toi + Moi" was a smash hit, peaking at number-one on the French Digital chart for six non-consecutive weeks from 27 September 2008, and eventually became the most downloaded single of the year in France. It was also much aired on radio, peaking at number two on 24 October 2008.

The song was also a number-one hit single and on the Belgian (Wallonia) Singles Chart, debuting at number one on 8 November and staying atop for twelve consecutive weeks. It totaled 35 weeks in the top 40 (Ultratop 50). The song was also a top ten hit in Switzerland and remained for 26 weeks in the top 100.

== Credits ==
- Written by Grégoire
- Vocals by Grégoire
- Arranged by Franck Authié and Grégoire
- Guitar by Franck Authié
- Mastered by Greg Calbi
- Piano by Cyril Taïeb
- Recorded by Franck Authié and Ken Ploquin
- Produced by Franck Authié

== Charts ==
=== Weekly charts ===
Weekly chart performance for "Toi + Moi"
Chart (2008–2012)	Peak position
Belgium (Ultratop 50 Flanders)	20
Belgium (Ultratop 50 Wallonia)	1
Canada (Hot 100)	68
France (Airplay Chart)	2
France (Digital Chart)	1
Switzerland (Hitparade)	9

=== Year-end charts ===
2008 year-end chart performance for "Toi + Moi"
Chart (2008)	Position
Belgium (Ultratop 50 Wallonia)	15
France (Airplay Chart)	18
France (Digital Chart)	1

2009 year-end chart performance for "Toi + Moi"
Chart (2009)	Position
Belgium (Ultratop 50 Wallonia)	2
France (Airplay Chart)	79
Switzerland (Hitparade)	97
