= Una parte di me (Amaury Vassili album) =

Studio album by Amaury Vassili
- Released: 22 October 2012
- Recorded: 2012
- Genre: Opera, operatic pop
- Label: Warner Music France
- Producer: Quentin Bachelet

Amaury Vassili chronology
| Canterò (2010) | Una parte di me (2012) | Amaury Vassili chante Mike Brant (2014) |

Una parte di me is the third studio album of Amaury Vassili released on Warner Music France on 22 October 2012. It entered SNEP the official French Albums Chart at #11.

Vassili has incorporated in the album the best from the greatest classical composers such as Mozart, Chopin, Tchaikovsky and Brahms with a touch of pop opera.

The title song is the debut single from the album.

== Track listing ==
Volume 1
| No. | Title | Writer(s) | Based on work(s) | Length |
|---|---|---|---|---|
| 1. | "Pensiero mio" | Tchaikovsky | Piano Concerto No. 1, Op. 23 | 3:43 |
| 2. | "I silenzi tra noi" (with Sofia Essaidi) | Brahms | Symphony No. 3 F majeur Op.90, 3rd movement | 3:56 |
| 3. | "Con te" | Chopin | Nocturne | 4:01 |
| 4. | "Credimi" | Fauré | Pavane | 3:15 |
| 5. | "Una parte di me" | Mozart | Symphony No. 40, 1st movement | 3:32 |
| 6. | "Siamo il futuro noi" | Borodin | Polovtsian dance of Prince Igor | 4:24 |
| 7. | "La guerra" (solo) | Bach | Le suite pour violoncelle seul, Prelude | 3:59 |
| 8. | "Amici noi" | Pachelbel | Canon | 4:03 |
| 9. | "Il lago dei cigni" (with Dominique Magloire) | Tchaikovski | Swan Lake (Le lac des cygnes) | 3:26 |
| 10. | "Sogno d'autunno" | Grieg | Solveig's Song | 3:40 |
| 11. | "Insieme a lei" | Mozart | Sonata No. 17 Sib Maj, KV570 | 3:12 |
| 12. | "Chiaro di luna" | Debussy | Clair de lune, Piano Voice | 3:51 |
| 13. | "Tous ensemble pour demain (Nous on rêve)" | Borodin | Polovtsian dance of Prince Igor | 4:22 |

Volume 2

1. DVD – Documentary and music clips

== Charts ==
| Chart (2012) | Peak position |
|---|---|
| Belgian Albums Chart (Wallonia) | 23 |
| French Albums Chart | 10 |

== Release history ==
| Region | Date | Label | Format |
|---|---|---|---|
| France | 22 October 2012 | Warner Music | CD |
