= Toi et moi (Charles Aznavour song) =

"Toi et Moi"

Song by Charles Aznavour

from the album Toi et Moi
- Released: October 6, 1994
- Genre: pop
- Length: 3:07
- Label: Musarm
- Songwriters: Charles Aznavour, Jean-Pierre Bourtayre, Jacques Revaux

"Toi et Moi" (English translation: You and Me) is a song written in 1994 by Charles Aznavour, Jean-Pierre Bourtayre, and Jacques Revaux. It was originally released on Aznavour's highly successful 1994 CD, aptly titled Toi et Moi. In 1995, the English version titled You and Me, as well as the Spanish version Tú y Yo were released. In 2018 Charles Aznavour sang new version duo with russian singer Polina Gagarina.
