= List of Republic Records artists =

This is a list of artists on Republic Records, a Universal Music Group company.

== 0-9 ==
- 3 Doors Down
- 41
- 5 Seconds of Summer
- 831 (We Rock Creative)

== A ==
- AFI
- AJR (joint with Mercury Records)
- Akon
- Aminé
- Angelina Jordan
- Animal Liberation Orchestra (Brushfire Records)
- Anitta
- Anthony Ramos
- Andy Black (Lava Records)
- Any Gabrielly
- Joseph Arthur (Real World Records)
- Zee Avi (Brushfire Records)
- Aziatix (Cash Money Records)
- Thomas Azier (Casablanca Records)
- Amanda Reifer (Republic Records)
- Ariana Grande (joint with BabyDoll Music)
- AtHeart (Imperial Music)

== B ==
- Bahamas (Brushfire Records)
- The Band Perry (Republic Nashville)
- James Bay (Mercury Records)
- Benee
- Belly (XO Records)
- Marc E. Bassy
- Birdman (Cash Money Records)
- B. Smyth (Motown Records)
- Birds of Tokyo (Lava Records)
- Black Sabbath (Vertigo/Republic) (US/Canada)
- Black Veil Brides
- James Blake
- Bloodhound Gang
- Bow Wow (Cash Money Records)
- Danielle Bradbery
- Dionne Bromfield
- Andy Bull
- Bo Burnham
- Craig Wayne Boyd (Dot Records)

== C ==
- The Cab
- Sofia Carson (Joint deal with Hollywood Records)
- Brynn Cartelli
- Caskey (Cash Money Records)
- Charles Hamilton
- Chris Richardson (Cash Money Records)
- City Morgue (Hikari-Ultra Records)
- Claire Rosinkranz
- Alex Clare (Island Records)
- Colbie Caillat
- Cortis (Big Hit Music)
- Matt Costa (Brushfire Records)
- Sarah Cothran
- Crystal Castles (Casablanca Records)
- Cut Copy (Loma Vista Recordings)
- Tessanne Chin
- Chelsea Cutler
- Chxrry (XO)

== D ==
- Daniel Caesar
- December 10 (US)
- Dengue Fever (Real World Records)
- Dev
- Dionela
- DNCE
- Drake (Young Money/OVO Sound)
- Dream

== E ==
- Eli Young Band (Republic Nashville)
- Euro
- Em Beihold

== F ==
- Fab!
- Florence and the Machine (US)
- Florida Georgia Line (Republic Nashville)
- Sawyer Fredericks
- Flaw
- Flo (Uptown Records (US))
- FripSide (NBCUniversal Entertainment Japan)
- Fujii Kaze (Universal Sigma/Hehn Records)

== G ==
- G. Love (Brushfire Records)
- Ghost (Loma Vista Recordings)
- Zach Gill (Brushfire Records)
- Girlset (JYP Entertainment)
- Ariana Grande
- Conan Gray
- Christina Grimmie (Island Records)
- Peter Gabriel (Real World Records)
- Glass Animals (US distribution)
- Godsmack
- Gotye
- Greta Van Fleet (Lava Records)
- Gudda Gudda (Young Money)
- Cory Gunz (Young Money)
- Get Scared (Fearless Records)

== H ==
- Neil Halstead (Brushfire Records)
- Mayer Hawthorne
- Angel Haze
- He Is We
- Paris Hilton (Cash Money Records)
- Ace Hood (Cash Money Records)
- Ben Howard
- Hollywood Vampires
- Sundance Head
- Hope Tala

== I ==
- Illenium
- Itzy (JYP Entertainment)
- Izna (WakeOne)

== J ==
- Paris Jackson
- Jack Johnson (Brushfire Records)
- James Graham
- Jeremy Zucker
- Jessica Sanchez
- Jessie J (Lava Records)
- Jonas Brothers
- Julia Michaels
- Justine Skye (Roc Nation)
- JPEGMAFIA
- Jagwar Twin (joint with Big Loud Rock & Mercury Records)
- Jxdn (Lava Records)

== K ==
- Kalin and Myles
- Kash Doll
- KA$HDAMI
- Kavinsky (Casablanca Records)
- Key Glock (Empire Distribution)
- Mat Kearney
- Klangkarussell (Casablanca Records)
- Kid Cudi
- Kira Kosarin
- King Charles
- Kylie Cantrall
- Josh Kaufman

== L ==
- The Last Bison
- Kiana Ledé (Three Name/Island/Republic)
- Lauren Spencer-Smith
- Lifer
- Lil Tecca (Galactic Records)
- Lil Twist (Young Money)
- Lil Wayne
- Limp Bizkit (Cash Money Records)
- Lindsay Lohan (Casablanca Records)
- Little Dragon (Loma Vista Recordings)
- The Lonely Island
- Lyn Lapid (Mercury Records)
- Lloyiso

== M ==
- Seth MacFarlane
- Madeon (Casablanca Records)
- Austin Mahone (Cash Money Records)
- Clare Maguire
- Maluca
- Adrian Marcel
- Damian Marley (Tuff Gong)
- Ida Maria (Lava Records)
- Metro Boomin (Boominati Worldwide)
- Shawn Mendes (Island Records)
- Isabela Merced
- Mika
- Christina Milian (Young Money)
- Nicki Minaj (Young Money)
- Sam Moran (Sony Music Australia)
- James Morrison
- Mystikal (Cash Money Records)
- Matt McAndrew (The Voice (U.S. TV series) Season 7 Runner-up)
- Maty Noyes
- Marshmello (Joytime Collective)
- Mushroomhead

== N ==
- The Naked and Famous
- Nav (XO Records)
- Natalie La Rose
- NMIXX (JYP Entertainment)
- Noah Kahan
- Nicki Minaj

== O ==
- Of Monsters and Men
- Oleander
- Otto Knows (Casablanca Records)
- Owl City
- Oh Wonder (Joint UK deal with Island Records)

== P ==
- Pacific Air
- Liam Payne (Joint UK deal with Capitol Records)
- Pearl Jam
- Phantogram
- Picture this
- Pop Smoke (Victor Victor Worldwide)
- Cassadee Pope (Republic Nashville)
- Post Malone (joint with Mercury Records, 2022-present)
- The Presets (Casablanca Records)
- Psy (P-Nation)
- Push Baby (School Boy Records)

== Q ==
- Quinn XCII

== R ==
- RDGLDGRN
- Rhea Raj (Joint with HYBE UMG)
- Rhye (Loma Vista Recordings)
- Chris Richardson (Cash Money Records)
- Rilès
- The Royal Concept (Lava Records)
- Kevin Rudolf (Cash Money Records)
- Rose Villain (Joint deal with Eddie O Entertainment)

== S ==
- Sage the Gemini
- Sarah Hyland
- Serebro
- The Score
- The Secret Sisters
- Shanell (Young Money)
- Shania Twain (Republic Nashville)
- Showing Teeth
- Ski Mask the Slump God (Victor Victor Worldwide)
- Snow Patrol
- SoMo
- Stafford Brothers (Cash Money Records)
- Stephen Sanchez (Joint with Mercury Records)
- Hailee Steinfeld (Joint with Mercury Records)
- Rod Stewart
- Sfera Ebbasta
- Stromae
- Swedish House Mafia
- Taylor Swift (Joint deal with Taylor Swift Productions)
- Stray Kids (JYP Entertainment)

== T ==
- The Avett Brothers (American Recordings)
- Trans-Siberian Orchestra (Lava Records),
- TRI.BE (TR Entertainment)
- Maxi Trusso (Pirca Records)
- tana (Galactic Records)
- Tyga (Young Money)
- The Hollywood Vampires
- The Soundtrack of Our Lives
- TXT (Big Hit Music)
- TWICE (JYP Entertainment)

== U ==
- Us The Duo

== V ==
- Vado (Cash Money Records)
- Volbeat

== W ==
- Wargasm
- Amy Winehouse
- The Warning (Lava Records)
- The Weeknd (XO Records)
- Tim Westwood (Cash Money Records)
- Weezer
- Karl Wolf

== X ==
- Xdinary Heroes (JYP Entertainment)

== Y ==
- The Young Professionals (Casablanca Records)
- Yoshino Nanjo (NBCUniversal Entertainment Japan)
- Youngblood Hawke
- Yung Gravy

== Z ==
- ZAYN (Mercury Records)
- Zendaya (Joint deal with Hollywood Records)
- ZillaKami (Hikari-Ultra Records)
