= Irma (singer) =

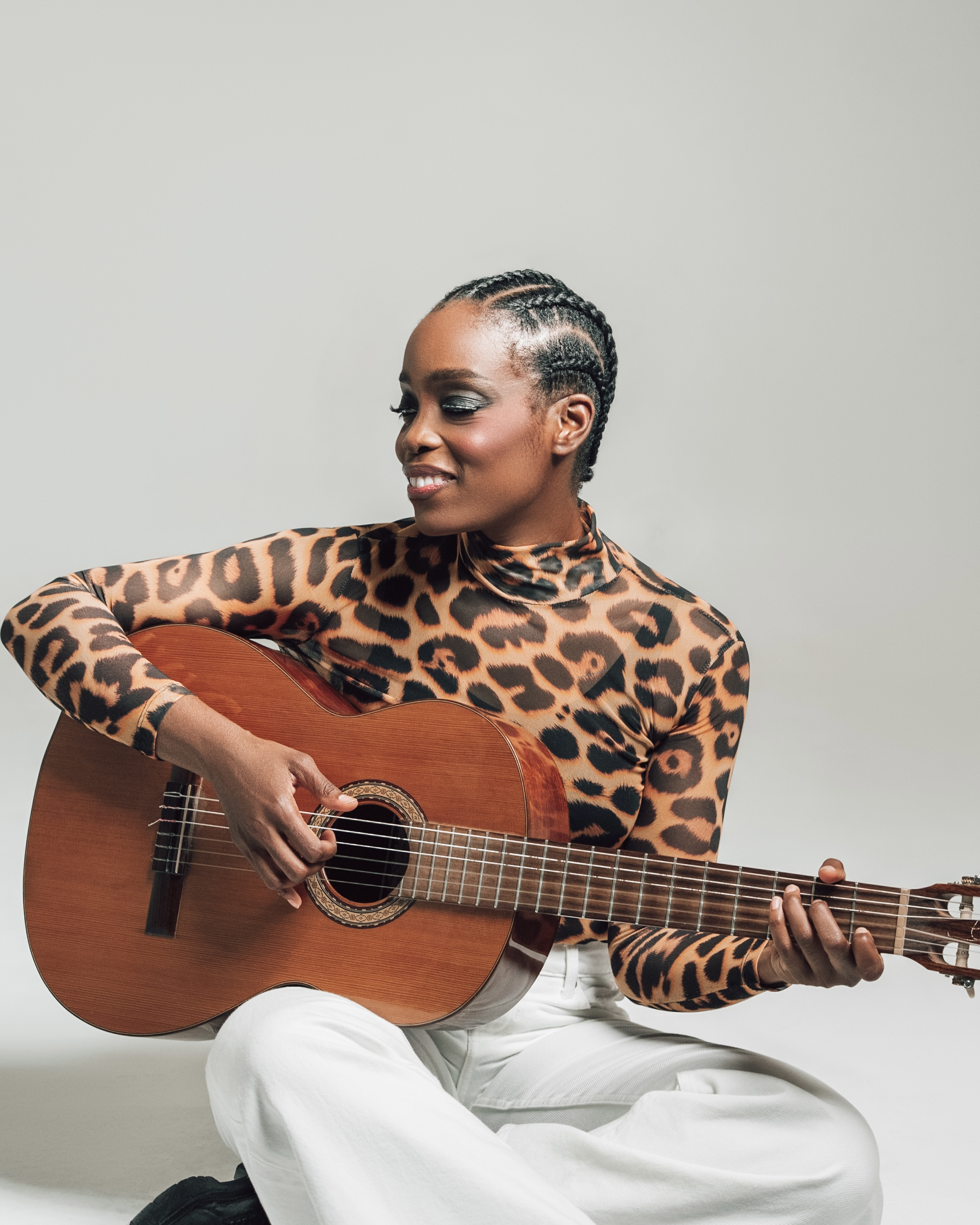
- Irma Pany, French-Cameroonian singer-songwriter (portrait)

Background information
- Born: Irma Pany; 15 July 1988 (age 37); Douala, Cameroon
- Origin: Paris, France
- Genres: Folk, pop
- Occupation: Singer-songwriter
- Instruments: Vocals, guitar, piano, drums
- Years active: 2007–present
- Labels: My Major Company, Universal Republic Records
- Website: irmaofficial.com

Irma Pany (born 15 July 1988), better known as Irma (French: [iʁma]), is a Cameroonian singer-songwriter living in France.

== Early life and education ==
She was born in Douala in a family with a scientific background. Her father is a biologist and her mother is a pharmacist.

As a child Irma was performing at masses too. At age 15, she went to a high school in Paris, France, to improve her school education.

In 2008, Irma entered ESCP Europe (Top French Business School) and graduated in the Master in Management in 2012.

== Career ==
By 2007, she had posted her first videos on YouTube. Those included her own compositions, including "Letter to the Lord" and a piano piece "Somehow", as well as cover versions of songs including "I Want You Back" by The Jackson 5, "Bubbly" by Colbie Caillat, and "New Soul" by Yael Naim.

She released several home-made videos with acoustic covers on YouTube in collaboration with French and international musicians, including Tété ("Hey Ya!"), Matthieu Chédid ("Rolling in the Deep"), Gad Elmaleh ("Isn't She Lovely?"), Tom Dice ("Talkin' 'bout a Revolution") from Belgium and Patrice ("The Times They Are a-Changin'") from Germany. Together with will.i.am from the Black Eyed Peas, she performed a cover version of "I Want You Back".

In the summer of 2008, she met Michael Goldman (son of a French musician Jean-Jacques Goldman), who in 2007 co-founded the music label My Major Company. Irma signed a record deal with My Major Company and released her first album Letter to the Lord in February 2011 in France, where it peaked in the top ten and was certified platinum a year after the release. In Switzerland, she debuted at number 46 and in Wallonia, Belgium, at number 18. The first single "I Know" reached number two in France. The music video was directed and shot by J.G. Biggs.

In 2011, she went on tour around Europe and in late 2011, signed a record contract to release her debut album in the US with Universal Republic Records. In 2012, she was featured in a European Google Chrome ad which chronicles her rise to fame after posting videos on YouTube, and she was nominated for the best French act at the 2012 MTV Europe Music Awards. In early 2013, she re-released her successful single "I Know" as a duet for the German market with German singer-songwriter Mic Donet.

In 2014, she recorded her second album Faces at Jungle City Studios in New York City.

"Save Me", the first single from Faces, was released the same year. The music video, directed by Xavier Maingon, won the "Starz People’s Choice Award" in the Music Video category at the 37th Starz Denver Film Festival in 2014.

In 2025, Irma completed a sold-out tour across Brazil, performing 25 dates in seven states, following a rise in popularity on social media.

== Discography ==
=== Albums ===
| Title | Album details | Peak chart positions | | | Certifications |
| Title | Album details | BEL (Wa) | FR | SWI | Certifications |
|---|---|---|---|---|---|
| Letter to the Lord | Released: February 2011; Label: My Major Company | 18 | 6 | 46 | SNEP: Platinum |
| Faces | Released: 2 June 2014; Label: My Major Company | 68 | 17 | 27 | |
| The Dawn | Released: 8 February 2020; Label: Irma Pany | | | | |

Others

- 2012: Letter to the Lord (Special 'Collectors Edition')

=== Singles ===
| Year | Single | Charts | | | | Album |
| Year | Single | BEL (Vl) | BEL (Wa) | FR | SWI | Album |
|---|---|---|---|---|---|---|
| 2011 | "I Know" | – | 7 | 2 | 42 | Letter to the Lord |
| 2012 | "Letter to the Lord" | – | – | 128 | – | Letter to the Lord |
| 2014 | "Hear Me Out" | 51* (Ultratip) | 27* (Ultratip) | 54 | – | Faces |
| 2014 | "Save Me" | – | – | 98 | – | Faces |

*Did not appear in the official Belgian Ultratop 50 charts, but rather in the bubbling under Ultratip charts.

Others

| Year | Single | Charts |
| Year | Single | FR |
|---|---|---|
| 2011 | "Watching Crap on TV" | – |
| 2012 | "I Know" (Remix Street version) (featuring Youssoupha) | 138 |
| 2012 | "I Know" (featuring Mic Donet) | – |

== Awards ==
| Year | Nominee / work | Award | Result |
|---|---|---|---|
| 2012 | Irma | Talent Découverte France Bleu | Won |
| 2012 | Irma | MTV European Music Awards – Best French Artist | Nominated |
| 2012 | Irma | Victoires de la musique – Live discovery | Nominated |
| 2014 | Irma – Save me | 37th Denver Film Festival – Starz People's Choice Award for Music videos | Won |

== See also ==
- Culture of Paris
- List of blues musicians
- List of folk musicians
- List of My Major Company artists
- List of Cameroonians
- List of Republic Records artists
- List of singer-songwriters
- List of Universal Republic Records artists
- Music of Cameroon
- Music of France
