= Vincerò (album) =

Studio album by Amaury Vassili
- Released: 6 February 2009
- Recorded: 2008–2009
- Genre: Operatic pop
- Label: Warner Music
- Producer: Quentin Bachelet

Amaury Vassili chronology
Vincerò (2009)	Canterò (2010)

Vincerò is the debut album by French singer Amaury Vassili. It was released on 6 February 2009. The album reached number 9 on the French Albums Chart. The album went double platinum and sold over 250,000 copies in France.

== Track listing ==
No.	Title	Writer(s)	Producer(s)	Length
1.	"Vincerò"	Davide Esposito, Stanislas Renoult	Quentin Bachelet	3:38
2.	"Parla più piano"	Gianni Boncompagni, Nino Rota	Quentin Bachelet	3:14
3.	"Lucente stella"	Quentin Bachelet, Davide Esposito, Sir Edward Elgar, Jean-Sebastien Abaldonato	Quentin Bachelet	4:04
4.	"Io ti amerò"	Davide Esposito	Quentin Bachelet	3:52
5.	"Fragile"	Ludwig van Beethoven, Davide Esposito	Quentin Bachelet	3:37
6.	"L'amore"	Davide Esposito	Quentin Bachelet	3:13
7.	"Un angelo"	Elodie Hesme, Davide Esposito, Stanislas Renoult	Quentin Bachelet	3:36
8.	"Con tutto il cuore"	Davide Esposito	Quentin Bachelet	3:50
9.	"Who Wants To Live Forever"	Brian May	Quentin Bachelet	3:41
10.	"Parla mi d'amore"	Daniel Moyne, Essaï Altounian, Davide Esposito	Quentin Bachelet	3:43
11.	"Per te"	Elodie Hesme, Davide Esposito, Stanislas Renoult	Quentin Bachelet	3:24
12.	"Hallelujah"	Leonard Cohen	Quentin Bachelet	6:12

== Chart performance ==
Chart (2009)	Peak position
Belgian Albums Chart (Wallonia)	31
French Albums Chart	9

== Release history ==
Region	Date	Label	Format
France	6 February 2009	Warner Music	CD
