= Non homologué =

Studio album by Jean-Jacques Goldman
- Released: September 1985
- Recorded: 1985, Studio Gang, Paris
- Genre: New wave, pop, progressive rock
- Length: 48:25
- Label: CBS
- Producer: Marc Lumbroso

Jean-Jacques Goldman chronology
Positif (1984)	Non homologué (1985)	En Public (1986)

Singles from Non homologué
- 1. "Je marche seul" Released: May 1985; 2. "Je te donne" Released: October 1985; 3. "Pas toi" Released: March 1986

Professional ratings
Review scores
Source	Rating
Allmusic	4/5 stars

Non homologué (pronounced [nɔ̃n‿ɔmɔlɔɡe]) is a 1985 album recorded by French artist Jean-Jacques Goldman. It was his fourth studio album and was released in September 1985. Goldman composed all the songs except "Je te donne", written in collaboration with Michael Jones. The album was recorded at Studio Gang by Jean-Pierre Janiau, assisted by Olivier do Espirito Santo. It was released by JRG/NEF and produced by Marc Lumbroso.

It provided three highly successful singles :"Je marche seul" (#2), "Je te donne" (#1) and "Pas toi" (#5). The album was also successful : it went straight to number-one on 6 October 1985 on the SNEP albums chart and topped for nine non consecutive weeks. It remained for 61 weeks in the top ten.

== Track listing ==
Vinyl

1. "Compte pas sur moi" — 5:24
2. "Parler d'ma vie" — 4:53
3. "La vie par procuration" — 4:12
4. "Délires schizo-maniaco-psychotiques" — 3:58
5. "Je marche seul" — 4:03
6. "Pas toi" — 5:29
7. "Je te donne" (duet with Michael Jones) — 4:24
8. "Famille" — 5:22
9. "Bienvenue sur mon boulevard" — 4:11
10. "Confidentiel" — 2:35

CD

1. "Compte pas sur moi" — 5:26
2. "Je te donne" (duet with Michael Jones) — 4:25
3. "Famille" — 5:33
4. "La vie par procuration" — 4:13
5. "Parler d'ma vie" — 5:08
6. "Pas toi" — 5:31
7. "Bienvenue sur mon boulevard" — 4:14
8. "Elle attend" — 3:17
9. "Délires schizo-maniaco-psychotiques" — 3:59
10. "Je marche seul" — 4:03
11. "Confidentiel" — 2:36

== Personnel ==
- Roland Romanelli - accordion
- Claude Samard- banjo
- Guy Delacroix, Claude Le Péron (Je te donne) - bass guitar
- Marc Changereau, P. A. Dahan, Guy Delacroix, Christophe Deschamps, Jean-François Gauthier - drums and percussion
- Michael Jones, Guy Delacroix, J. L. Delest, P. Gaillard, Jean-Jacques Goldman, Robert Goldman, Jean-Pierre Janiaud - vocals
- Jean-Jacques Goldman - acoustic guitar
- Jean-Jacques Goldman, Michael Jones, Non Krief - electric guitar
- Georges Rodi - organ
- Jean-Yves d'Angelo, Guy Delacroix, Jean-Jacques Goldman - piano
- Guy Delacroix - programming
- Jean-Jacques Goldman, Roland Romanelli - synthesizer
- Chet Baker - trumpet
- Patrice Mondon - violin

== Charts, certifications and sales ==
Chart (1985)	Peak position
French SNEP Albums Chart	1

Country	Certification	Date	Sales certified
France	Diamond	1991	1,000,000
