= C'est ta chance =

Single by Jean-Jacques Goldman

from the album Entre gris clair et gris foncé
- B-side: "Doux"; "Il me restera" (CD single)
- Released: April, 1988
- Recorded: France
- Genre: Pop
- Length: 4:26
- Label: Epic
- Songwriter(s): Jean-Jacques Goldman
- Producer(s): Jean-Jacques Goldman; Marc Lumbroso

Jean-Jacques Goldman singles chronology
"Là-bas" (1988)	"C'est ta chance" (1988)	"Puisque tu pars" (1988)

"C'est ta chance" is the name of a 1987 song recorded by the French singer and songwriter Jean-Jacques Goldman. It was released in April 1988 as the third single from his album Entre gris clair et gris foncé, on which it features as the fifth track. The song achieved a moderate success in France, in comparison with Goldman's previous and next singles.

== Lyrics, music and video ==
Written by Jean-Jacques Goldman, the song tells the story of a girl who wants to succeed in life and who is forced to fight against the difficulties of life to achieve it. The video was produced as an animated feature. In it, a girl dreams of becoming a music star and she eventually succeeds thanks to her perseverance.

About this song, Goldman explained in an interview : "This song is similar to what I have done before. It is almost a caricature. I like the lyrics".

The song features on the live album Traces. It was also included on Goldman's compilations Intégrale and Singulier.

== Critical reception ==
A review in Music & Media presented "C'est ta chance" as "an infectious, thoughtful number with a touch of Eurovision in the overall sound and some fine singing by Goldman".

== Chart performance and cover version ==
"C'est ta chance" debuted at number 37 on the French Singles Chart on 16 April 1988, peaked at number 16 in its fifth week, then dropped and remained in the top 50 for only 12 weeks, thus becoming the second least-selling single from the album Entre gris clair et gris foncé. On the Eurochart Hot 100 Singles, it entered at number 72 on 7 May 1988, reach a peak of number 57 three weeks later, and fell off the chart after six weeks. It also charted for eight weeks on the European Airplay Top 50, with a peak at number 22 in its seventh week, on 4 June 1988.

The song was covered by the contestants of the Canadian Star Academy in 2004. This version is available on an album they released.

== Track listings ==
- 7" single
1. "C'est ta chance" (7" version) — 4:26
2. "Doux" — 3:54
- 12" maxi
1. "C'est ta chance" (extended version) — 4:59
2. "Doux" — 3:54
- CD single
1. "C'est ta chance" (7" version) — 4:26
2. "Doux" — 3:54
3. "Il me restera" — 3:14

== Charts ==
Chart (1988)	Peak position
Europe (European Airplay Top 50)	22
Europe (European Hot 100)	57
France (SNEP)	16
Quebec (ADISQ)	4
