= Là-bas (song) =

Single by Jean-Jacques Goldman and Sirima

from the album Entre gris clair et gris foncé
- B-side: "À quoi tu sers ?"
- Released: November 1987
- Recorded: France
- Genre: Pop
- Length: 4:46
- Label: Epic
- Songwriter: Jean-Jacques Goldman
- Producers: Jean-Jacques Goldman; Marc Lumbroso

Jean-Jacques Goldman singles chronology
| "Elle a fait un bébé toute seule" (1987) | "Là-bas" (1987) | "C'est ta chance" (1988) |

"Là-bas" is a 1987 song recorded as a duet by the French singer Jean-Jacques Goldman and the British-born artist Sirima. It was the second single from Goldman's 1987 double album Entre gris clair et gris foncé. It was a smash hit in France and became a popular song throughout the years.

== Background, lyrics and music ==
In 1987, Goldman had finished composing the song but had not yet found a female voice to record the duet with him. Philippe Delettrez, Goldman's saxophonist, met Sirima who sang in a Parisian metro, and suggested that Goldman meet her. After several takes in studio, Goldman finally decided to record the duet with her.

Composed by Jean-Jacques Goldman, the song deals with "the need of escape and the dilemma between a vital renewal and the loss of one's roots". Goldman and Sirima sing the song as a fictional couple from an unidentified country, described as poor and socially rigged. While the man wants to go away to start a more fruitful life in the country of his dreams (also unidentified and thus acting as a universal metaphor), the woman, who personifies "stability, rooting and habit", warns him about all kinds of dangers he could encounter and begs him to stay with her and start a family. The song is built as a dialogue that ends with two monologues in which "one is decided, while the other begs".

The song was also released under the title "Over there" to win over the anglophone countries. On Radio Canada, it was awarded best francophone song of the year thanks to the votes of listeners.

He had already explored a similar theme in the 1975 Tai Phong song "Going Away" (where the protagonist is alone), and would again in his 1997 song "On ira" (which is sung from the perspective of a man to an unnamed woman). In an interview, Goldman pointed out that the latter song made direct reference to "Là-bas" by borrowing a line from it : "Ici tout est joué d'avance", meaning "Here everything is set from the beginning", became "Même si tout est joué d'avance", meaning "Even if everything is set from the beginning" (suggesting this time that the male protagonist, presumably more mature and fatalist, and in a reversed socio-economic context, i.e. living in a rich country and longing for a more meaningful life outside of his suffocating comfort, is aware that there is not much to be gained "out there" but still has the urge to go anyway; and this time he is the one begging for the woman to go with him, as it doesn't make sense for him to go alone).

== Chart performances ==
In France, the song charted for 21 weeks on the top 50, from 5 December 1987 to 23 April 1988. It entered at number 17 and reached the top ten three weeks later. It peaked at number two for five non consecutive weeks, but was unable to dislodge Guesch Patti's "Étienne", then Sabrina's "Boys (Summertime Love)" which topped the chart then. After 12 weeks in the top ten, the single dropped on the chart. It achieved Gold status awarded by the Syndicat National de l'Édition Phonographique in 1988. On the Eurochart Hot 100 Singles, it entered at number 43 on 12 December 1987, reach a peak of number 6 four weeks later, and fell off the chart after 18 weeks, seven of them in the top ten. It also charted for 11 weeks on the European Ariplay Top 50, with a peak at number 33 in its ninth week, on 27 February 1988.

== Cover versions ==
The song was covered by many artists throughout the years, including Michel Delpech in 1996, Murray Head and Lio, Corey Hart and Julie Masse in 1998, Renaud Hantson and Nourith, Michel Leclerc (instrumental version) in 2000, Florent Pagny and Natasha St-Pier in 2002 (available on St-Pier's album De l'amour le mieux), Philippe Heuvelinne and Marc Rouvé in 2003, Humana, Prise 2 Son (released as a single, the second track of the CD "Un Autre Monde, number 45 in France) in 2004, Opium du Peuple, and Grégory Lemarchal and the 500 choristers in 2007 (available on his posthumous album La Voix d'un ange). All these versions were recorded on an album or a single.

Jean-Jacques Goldman re-recorded the song as a duet with Céline Dion for the Les Enfoirés' 1996 album La Compil'. In 1992, he performed the song with Carole Fredericks and Michael Jones for the live album Sur scène.

The song was performed on several French TV programmes, such as Tapis Rouge à Notre-Dame de Paris (France 2, 15 April 2000) by Hélène Ségara and Bruno Pelletier, Tubes d'un jour, tubes de toujours (TF1, 27 December 2002) by Daniel Lévi and Cécilia Cara. The song was also performed in Dutch-language by Erik Mesie and Nadieh under the title "Ik sta".

In 2012, Marie-Mai and Baptiste Giabiconi covered the song on the number one album Génération Goldman.

Jean-Jacques Goldman and Michael Jones made an English version of the song called "On my way home" interpreted by Joe Cocker (album No ordinary world). As often with English translations of French songs in general (as exemplified by "My Way", based on Claude François' "Comme d'habitude", or "Only The Very Best" from Tycoon, based on Starmania's "SOS d'un terrien en détresse"), and Goldman songs in particular, the lyrics are not a literal translation of the original (on my way home versus leaving) but remain true to the overall theme (tribulation).

== Formats and track listings ==
- 7" single
1. "Là-bas — 4:46
2. "À quoi tu sers ?" — 5:29
- 12" maxi
1. "Là-bas" (extended version) — 6:08
2. "À quoi tu sers ?" (vocal) — 5:29
- CD single
1. "Là-bas — 4:46
2. "À quoi tu sers ?" — 5:29
3. "Entre gris clair et gris foncé" — 7:19

== Charts and certifications ==
=== Weekly charts ===
| Chart (1987–1988) | Peak position |
|---|---|
| Europe (European Airplay Top 50) | 33 |
| Europe (European Hot 100) | 6 |
| France (SNEP) | 2 |
| Quebec (ADISQ) | 4 |

=== Year-end charts ===
| Chart (1988) | Position |
|---|---|
| Europe (European Hot 100) | 56 |

=== Certifications ===
Certifications for "Là-bas"
| Region | Certification | Certified units/sales |
|---|---|---|
| France (SNEP) | Gold | 500,000^{*} |
^{*} Sales figures based on certification alone.
