= Un homme libre (album) =

Studio album by Baptiste Giabiconi
- Released: June 2, 2014
- Recorded: 2013–2014
- Genre: Pop
- Label: Be 1st Music / Smart (Sony Music)

Baptiste Giabiconi chronology
Oxygen (2012)	Un homme libre (2014)

Un homme libre is the second studio album from French male model and singer Baptiste Giabiconi. It was released on 2 June 2014 on Be 1st Music / Smart record label, an affiliate of Sony Music. Contrary to his debut album that was mainly in English, this album is an all French language album destined to French-speaking markets and contains 12 tracks. It peaked at #44 on the SNEP official French Albums Chart.

== Track listing ==
1. "Je te aime" (2:46)
2. "Je t'emmène avec moi" (3:12)
3. "Demain" (3:21)
4. "Le monde sera vert" (2:38)
5. "Nos jours meilleurs" (3:35)
6. "Petit ange" (3:29)
7. "Embrasse-moi" (3:12)
8. "C'est ta route" (2:33)
9. "Je t'adore" (3:08)
10. "Un homme libre" (2:33)
11. "La fille d'hiver" (2:51)
12. "Elle est celle" (2:33)

== Charts ==
Chart (2012)	Peak position
Ultratop Belgian (Wallonia) Albums Chart	156
SNEP French Albums Chart	44
