= Amaury Vassili =

French opera singer

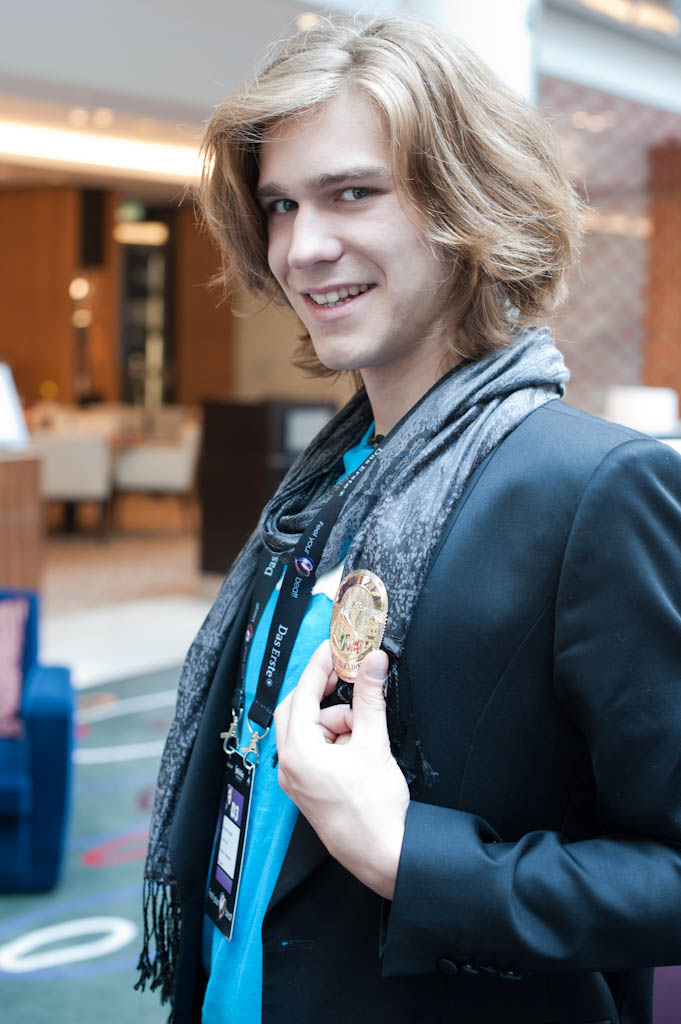

Background information
- Born: 8 June 1989 (age 37); Rouen, France
- Genres: Opera, operatic pop
- Occupation: Singer
- Years active: 2009–present
- Label: Warner Music France
- Website: amauryvassili.com

Amaury Vassili Chotard (born 8 June 1989) is a French opera singer and professional tenor. His debut album, Vincerò (2009), went double platinum in France, and he has had international success with releases in Canada, South Africa, and South Korea.

== Biography ==
Amaury Vassili Chotard was born in Rouen, Upper Normandy, and began singing around the age of 9 years, enrolled by his mother at a musical school in Rouen, created by Albert and Elizabeth Amsallem. At 14, Vassili competed in his first singing contest, where he won in singing "Amsterdam" by Jacques Brel (an idol of Vassili). In Vassili's second contest, in front of a full house, he sang "Les Lacs du Connemara" by Michel Sardou; however he did not qualify for the final, despite receiving a standing ovation from the crowd. During the contest, his mother realised how much he enjoyed being on the stage and especially the impact he had on the public, saying "C'est son truc !" ("it's his thing!"). In 2004, Vassili took first place in the Coupe de France de la chanson française.

He became famous with his debut album, Vincerò (2009), which went double platinum (over 250,000 copies) after a worldwide release. His second album, Canterò, was released in November 2010. Vassili describes his music style as "lyrical pop".

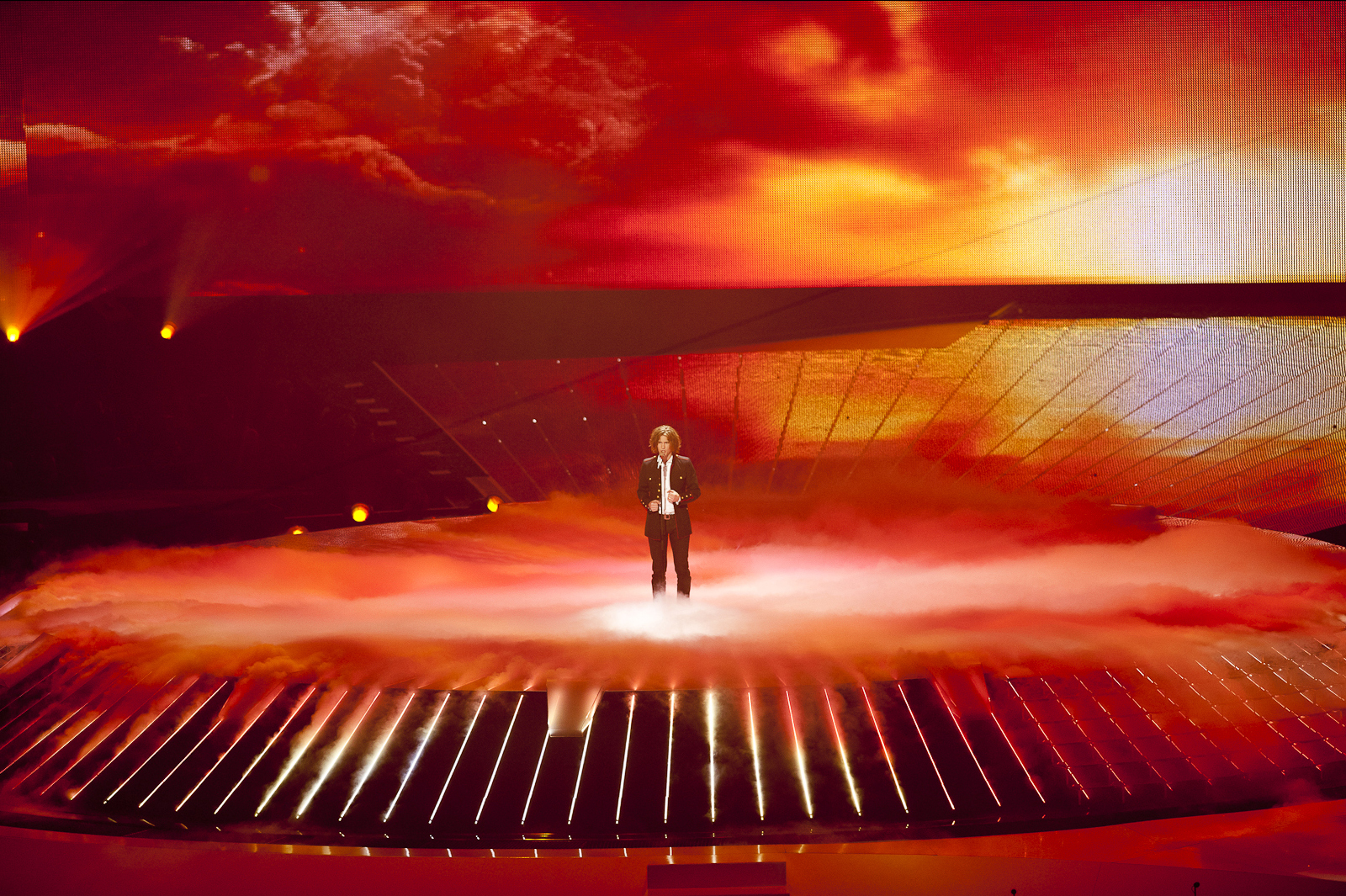
Vassili performing at the final of the Eurovision Song Contest 2011.

== Eurovision Song Contest 2011 ==
On 27 January 2011, it was announced by the French broadcaster France Télévisions that Vassili would be the French entry at the Eurovision Song Contest 2011 to be held in Düsseldorf, Germany. The song was revealed as "Sognu", and was performed in Corsican. It marks the second French Eurovision entry to be performed in the language after Patrick Fiori received fourth place with "Mama Corsica" in 1993.

Vassili eventually placed 15th with 82 points.

== Post-Eurovision to present ==
Vassili was the spokesperson for France during the Eurovision Song Contest 2012 and presented the country's voting results. He participated on the French version of the Masked Singer as Turtle and became the first male contestant to win the show.

== Discography ==
=== Albums ===
Year	Album	Peak chart positions		
Year	Album	FRA	BEL (WA)	SWI
2009	Vincerò: Released: 6 February 2009; Label: Warner Music; Formats: CD, digital download	9	31	-
2010	Canterò: Released: 26 November 2010; Label: Warner Music; Formats: CD, digital download	8	18	76
2012	Una parte di me: Released: 22 October 2012; Label: Warner Music; Formats: CD, digital download	15	23	-
2014	Amaury Vassili chante Mike Brant: Released: 24 October 2014; Label: Warner Music; Formats: CD, digital download	7	10	-
2015	Chansons populaires: Released: 16 October 2015; Label: Warner Music; Formats: CD, digital download	18	27	88
2018	Amaury: Released: 18 May 2018; Label: Warner Music; Formats: CD, digital download	82	83	-
2021	Crescendo: Released: 21 May 2021; Label: MCA / East 47th Music; Formats: CD, digital download	121	152	-

=== Singles ===
Year	Single	Peak chart positions		Album
Year	Single	FRA	BEL (WAL)	Album
2009	"Lucente Stella"	—	73	Vincerò
2009	"Mi Fa Morire Cantando"	—	—	Vincerò
2010	"Endless Love" (duet with Katherine Jenkins)	—	—	Vincerò
2011	"Sognu"	33	25	Canterò (Nouvelle édition)
2012	"Una parte di me"	—	—	Una parte di me

=== Other songs ===
Year	Single	Album
2006	"Nos Instants de Liberté"	Non-Album single
2008	"Parla più piano"	Vincerò
2008	"Io Ti Amerò"	Vincerò
2010	"Hallelujah"	Vincerò
2010	"Maria"	Canterò

Preceded by Jessy Matador with "Allez Ola Olé"	France in the Eurovision Song Contest; 2011	Succeeded by Anggun with "Echo (You and I)"
