= Toi + Moi =

Studio album by Grégoire
- Released: 22 September 2008
- Recorded: 2008
- Genre: Pop
- Label: My Major Company, Warner

Grégoire chronology
Toi + Moi (2008)	Le Même Soleil (2010)

Singles from Toi + Moi
- 1. "Toi + Moi" Released: 2008; 2. "Rue des Étoiles" Released: 2009; 3. "Ta Main" Released: April 2009; 4. "Nuages" Released: 2009

Professional ratings
Review scores
Source	Rating
Rocknfrance	2/10 stars
Ciao	3/5 stars
Benzine Magazine	2.5/5 stars

Toi + Moi is a 2008 album recorded by French singer Grégoire. It was his debut album released in September 2008 and achieved huge success in France and Belgium (Wallonia) where it reached the top five. In France, it hit number-one in its 42nd and 47th weeks. It provided four singles : "Toi + Moi", which was a huge hit in Belgium and the French digital chart (#1), "Rue des Étoiles", "Ta Main" and "Nuages".

The album received generally positive reviews from musical critics. My Major Company, the label which released the album, stated : "Gregory is an excellent songwriter. Discover his captivating world, between torture and naivety, composed of catchy melodies serving magical texts." In 2012 the contestants of Star Académie covered the song in Québec to much popularity.

== Track listings ==
=== CD ===
1. "Ta Main" – 3:34
2. "Nuages" – 3:08
3. "Toi + Moi" – 3:03
4. "Rien à voir" – 2:41
5. "Ce qu'il reste de toi" – 3:32
6. "Donne moi une chance" – 3:29
7. "Rue des Étoiles" – 3:55
8. "Sauver le monde" – 3:33
9. "L'ami intime" – 3:09
10. "Prière" – 3:52
11. "Merci" – 3:21
12. "À la claire fontaine – 2:34

Bonus tracks

1. "Rue des Étoiles" (acoustic) – 3:50
2. "Nuages" (acoustic) – 3:00

=== DVD ===
1. Grégoire : portrait – 14:30
2. Live TV5 acoustic – 26:00
3. "Toi + Moi" (music video) – 3:02
4. "Rue des Étoiles" (music video) – 3:55

== Credits and personnel ==
Recording

- Written and composed by Grégoire (tracks: 1–11,13,14)
- Arranged by Franck Authié and Grégoire
- Mastered by Greg Calbi
- Mixed by Steve Forward
- Produced by Franck Authié
- Vocals by Grégoire

Musicians

- Bass, banjo, mandolin and programmations by Franck Authié
- Cello by Delphine Capuçon (tracks : 4,5,10)
- Drums and percussion by Matthieu Rabaté
- Glockenspiel by Grégoire (tracks: 1,7)
- Guitar by Franck Authié (tracks: 1–11,13,14)
- Piano by Cyril Taïeb
- Violin by Karen Brunon (tracks: 4,5,10)

== Release history ==
Date	Label	Country	Format	Catalog
September 2008	My Major Company / Warner	Belgium, France, Switzerland	CD	9788889009826
16 January 2009	My Major Company / Warner	Belgium, France, Switzerland	CD + DVD	5051865235927

== Charts and sales ==
=== Peak positions ===
Chart (2008/09)	Peak position
Belgian (Wallonia) Albums Chart	5
French Digital Chart	1
French Albums Chart	1
Swiss Albums Chart	18
Chart (2010)	Peak position
Greek Albums Chart	25

=== Year-end charts ===
Chart (2009)	Position
Belgian (Wallonia) Albums Chart	7
French Albums Chart	3
Swiss Albums Chart	46
Chart (2010)	Position
Belgian (Wallonia) Albums Chart	100

=== Certifications ===
Country	Certification	Date	Sales certified	Physical sales
Belgium	Gold	13 March 2009	15,000	
France	Diamond	28 December 2009	500,000	1,150,000
