= MyMajorCompany =

Crowdfunding platform in Europe

- Industry: crowdfunding
- Founded: December 2007; 18 years ago
- Founders: Michael Goldman; Sevan Barsikian; Anthony Marciano; Simon Istolainen
- Headquarters: 20, rue du Sentier, 75002 Paris, France
- Website: mymajorcompany.com

MyMajorCompany is a crowdfunding platform in Europe.

== History ==
Since 2007, MyMajorCompany has been an independent record label. In hard times for the music industry, its co-funders began enrolling internet users in financing young artists.

During its first year, MyMajorCompany raised one million Euros for artists including Grégoire (1.5 million albums sold), Irma, and Joyce Jonathan (both platinum-selling artists).

In 2012, the company broadened its business model to include cinema, publishing, video games, arts, and entrepreneurship.
