= List of number-one hits of 2009 (France) =

This is a list of the French SNEP Top 100 CD Singles, Top 50 Digital Singles, Top 200 CD Albums & Top 50 Digital Albums number-ones of 2009.

== Number-ones by week ==
=== Singles chart ===
Week	Issue date	Physical singles			Digital singles		
Week	Issue date	Artist	Title	Sales	Artist	Title	Sales
1	January 4	Britney Spears	"Womanizer"	5,888	Jason Mraz	"I'm Yours"	
2	January 11	Britney Spears	"Womanizer"	3,154	Jason Mraz	"I'm Yours"	
3	January 18	Mikelangelo Loconte	"Tatoue-moi"	8,280	Mikelangelo Loconte	"Tatoue-moi"	
4	January 25	Mikelangelo Loconte	"Tatoue-moi"	7,527	Pussycat Dolls	"I Hate This Part"	
5	February 1	Mikelangelo Loconte	"Tatoue-moi"	7,527 (=)	Pussycat Dolls	"I Hate This Part"	
6	February 8	Mikelangelo Loconte	"Tatoue-moi"	7,062	Lady Gaga	"Poker Face"	
7	February 15	Mikelangelo Loconte	"Tatoue-moi"	6,356	Lady Gaga	"Poker Face"	
8	February 22	Mylène Farmer	"Si j'avais au moins..."	12,375	Lady Gaga	"Poker Face"	
9	March 1	Lady Gaga	"Poker Face"	6,049	Pep's	"Liberta"	
10	March 8	Pep's	"Liberta"	7,784	Les Enfoirés	"Ici les Enfoirés"	
11	March 15	Pep's	"Liberta"	5,513	Les Enfoirés	"Ici les Enfoirés"	
12	March 22	Lady Gaga	"Poker Face"	4,303	Les Enfoirés	"Ici les Enfoirés"	
13	March 29	Lady Gaga	"Poker Face"		Les Enfoirés	"Ici les Enfoirés"	
14	April 5	Lady Gaga	"Poker Face"	4,284	Helmut Fritz	"Ça m'énerve"	
15	April 12	Charlie Winston	"Like a Hobo"	5,407	Helmut Fritz	"Ça m'énerve"	
16	April 19	Magic System & Khaled	"Même pas fatigué !!!"	8,676	Helmut Fritz	"Ça m'énerve"	
17	April 26	Magic System & Khaled	"Même pas fatigué !!!"		Helmut Fritz	"Ça m'énerve"	
18	May 3	Magic System & Khaled	"Même pas fatigué !!!"	6,305	Helmut Fritz	"Ça m'énerve"	
19	May 10	Mylène Farmer	"C'est dans l'air"	16,631	Helmut Fritz	"Ça m'énerve"	
20	May 17	Magic System & Khaled	"Même pas fatigué !!!"		Helmut Fritz	"Ça m'énerve"	
21	May 24	Magic System & Khaled	"Même pas fatigué !!!"		Helmut Fritz	"Ça m'énerve"	
22	May 31	Magic System & Khaled	"Même pas fatigué !!!"	4,900	Helmut Fritz	"Ça m'énerve"	
23	June 7	Magic System & Khaled	"Même pas fatigué !!!"		Helmut Fritz	"Ça m'énerve"	
24	June 14	Helmut Fritz	"Ça m'énerve"		The Black Eyed Peas	"Boom Boom Pow"	
25	June 21	Helmut Fritz	"Ça m'énerve"	7,264	Black Eyed Peas	"Boom Boom Pow"	
26	June 28	Helmut Fritz	"Ça m'énerve"	7,264 (=)	Michael Jackson	"Billie Jean"	11,872
27	July 5	Helmut Fritz	"Ça m'énerve"	7,234	Michael Jackson	"Billie Jean"	15,478
28	July 12	Pitbull	"I Know You Want Me (Calle Ocho)"	6,319	Pitbull	"I Know You Want Me (Calle Ocho)"	9,899
29	July 19	Pitbull	"I Know You Want Me (Calle Ocho)"	6,038	Pitbull	"I Know You Want Me (Calle Ocho)"	9,926
30	July 26	Pitbull	"I Know You Want Me (Calle Ocho)"	5,934	Pitbull	"I Know You Want Me (Calle Ocho)"	9,175
31	August 2	Pitbull	"I Know You Want Me (Calle Ocho)"	6,853	Pitbull	"I Know You Want Me (Calle Ocho)"	8,900
32	August 9	Pitbull	"I Know You Want Me (Calle Ocho)"		Tom Frager	"Lady Melody"	
33	August 16	Pitbull	"I Know You Want Me (Calle Ocho)"		Tom Frager	"Lady Melody"	
34	August 23	Pitbull	"I Know You Want Me (Calle Ocho)"	3,665	David Guetta feat. Akon	"Sexy Bitch"	7,855
35	August 30	Pitbull	"I Know You Want Me (Calle Ocho)"	3,338	David Guetta feat. Akon	"Sexy Bitch"	10,415
36	September 6	Mylène Farmer	"Sextonik"	4,533	David Guetta feat. Akon	"Sexy Bitch"	13,212 ^{1}
37	September 13	Tom Frager	"Lady Melody"	6,712	David Guetta feat. Akon	"Sexy Bitch"	15,475
38	September 20	Tom Frager	"Lady Melody"	5,281	David Guetta feat. Akon	"Sexy Bitch"	15,725
39	September 27	Tom Frager	"Lady Melody"	5,324	David Guetta feat. Akon	"Sexy Bitch"	14,449
40	October 4	Tom Frager	"Lady Melody"	5,471	David Guetta feat. Akon	"Sexy Bitch"	11,244
41	October 11	Jena Lee	"J'aimerais tellement"	5,361	David Guetta feat. Akon	"Sexy Bitch"	12,144
42	October 18	Jena Lee	"J'aimerais tellement"	4,346	David Guetta feat. Akon	"Sexy Bitch"	11,313
43	October 25	Jena Lee	"J'aimerais tellement"	5,041	David Guetta feat. Akon	"Sexy Bitch"	10,521
44	November 1	Jena Lee	"J'aimerais tellement"	6,153	Jena Lee	"J'aimerais tellement"	10,315
45	November 8	Jena Lee	"J'aimerais tellement"	6,992	Jena Lee	"J'aimerais tellement"	12,926
46	November 15	Jena Lee	"J'aimerais tellement"	5,679	Jena Lee	"J'aimerais tellement"	13,637
47	November 22	Jena Lee	"J'aimerais tellement"	5,794	Edward Maya feat. Vika Jigulina	"Stereo Love"	6,142 ^{2}
48	November 29	Jena Lee	"J'aimerais tellement"	5,716	Edward Maya feat. Vika Jigulina	"Stereo Love"	7,048
49	December 6	Jena Lee	"J'aimerais tellement"	7,303	Edward Maya feat. Vika Jigulina	"Stereo Love"	7,956
50	December 13	Jena Lee	"J'aimerais tellement"	6,666	Edward Maya feat. Vika Jigulina	"Stereo Love"	7,848
51	December 20	Jena Lee	"J'aimerais tellement"	6,333	Edward Maya feat. Vika Jigulina	"Stereo Love"	7,926
52	December 27	Edward Maya feat. Vika Jigulina	"Stereo Love"		Edward Maya feat. Vika Jigulina	"Stereo Love"	

^{1} SNEP decides to take into account also downloads on mobile phones. ^{2} Downloads on mobile phones are no longer taken into account in the charts.

=== Albums chart ===
Week	Issue date	Physical albums			Digital albums		
Week	Issue date	Artist	Title	Sales	Artist	Title	Sales
1	January 4	Seal	Soul	42,753	Seal	Soul	
2	January 11	Seal	Soul	21,216	Seal	Soul	
3	January 18	Seal	Soul	21,004	Charlie Winston	Hobo	
4	January 25	Seal	Soul	28,114	Charlie Winston	Hobo	
5	February 1	Seal	Soul	21,586	Charlie Winston	Hobo	
6	February 8	Seal	Soul	18,749	Charlie Winston	Hobo	
7	February 15	Seal	Soul	26,249	Soundtrack	LOL	
8	February 22	Seal	Soul	16,196	Soundtrack	LOL	
9	March 1	U2	No Line on the Horizon	63,109	U2	No Line on the Horizon	
10	March 8	Les Enfoirés	2009 : les Enfoirés font leur cinéma	152,196	Les Enfoirés	2009 : les Enfoirés font leur cinéma	
11	March 15	Les Enfoirés	2009 : les Enfoirés font leur cinéma	151,476	Les Enfoirés	2009 : les Enfoirés font leur cinéma	
12	March 22	Les Enfoirés	2009 : les Enfoirés font leur cinéma	56,836	Alain Bashung	Bleu pétrole	
13	March 29	Les Enfoirés	2009 : les Enfoirés font leur cinéma		Jason Mraz	We Sing. We Dance. We Steal Things.	
14	April 5	Les Enfoirés	2009 : les Enfoirés font leur cinéma	23,889	Archive	Controlling Crowds	
15	April 12	Les Enfoirés	2009 : les Enfoirés font leur cinéma	20,783	Olivia Ruiz	Miss Météores	
16	April 19	Olivia Ruiz	Miss Météores	25,515	Calogero	L'embellie	
17	April 26	Calogero	L'embellie	45,000	Depeche Mode	Sounds of the Universe	
18	May 3	Kery James	Réel	22,981	Calogero	L'embellie	
19	May 10	Calogero	L'embellie	16,726	Calogero	L'embellie	
20	May 17	Green Day	21st Century Breakdown		Bob Sinclar	Born in 69	
21	May 24	Eminem	Relapse	17,170	Eminem	Relapse	
22	May 31	Christophe Willem	Caféine	44,354	Christophe Willem	Caféine	5,414
23	June 7	Christophe Willem	Caféine		Soundtrack	Home	
24	June 14	Placebo	Battle for the Sun	25,657	Placebo	Battle for the Sun	
25	June 21	The Black Eyed Peas	The E.N.D.	12,835	Compilation	Fête de la musique 2009	
26	June 28	Black Eyed Peas	The E.N.D.	8,086	Michael Jackson	Thriller	4,238
27	July 5	Michael Jackson	The Collection	11,000	Michael Jackson	Thriller	2,363
28	July 12	Grégoire Michael Jackson	Toi + Moi Thriller (Back Catalogue)	7,207 77,997	Michael Jackson	The Essential Michael Jackson	2,634
29	July 19	Charlie Winston Michael Jackson	Hobo Thriller	6,465 39,695	Michael Jackson	The Essential Michael Jackson	1,121
30	July 26	Charlie Winston Michael Jackson	Hobo Thriller	6,462 22,505	The Black Eyed Peas	The E.N.D.	808
31	August 2	Charlie Winston Michael Jackson	Hobo Thriller	6,459 18,977	Black Eyed Peas	The E.N.D.	921
32	August 9	Charlie Winston	Hobo		Black Eyed Peas	The E.N.D.	
33	August 16	Grégoire	Toi + Moi		Black Eyed Peas	The E.N.D.	
34	August 23	Black Eyed Peas	The E.N.D.	7,366	David Guetta	One Love	1,562
35	August 30	David Guetta	One Love	37,815	David Guetta	One Love	3,392
36	September 6	Marc Lavoine	Volume 10	32,189	-M-	Mister Mystère	5,458
37	September 13	-M-	Mister Mystère	51,073	-M-	Mister Mystère	2,593
38	September 20	Muse	The Resistance	48,000	Muse	The Resistance	5,929
39	September 27	Mika	The Boy Who Knew Too Much	39,791	Mika	The Boy Who Knew Too Much	3,546
40	October 4	Johnny Hallyday	Tour 66 : Stade de France 2009	48,875	Muse	The Resistance	1,705
41	October 11	Johnny Hallyday	Tour 66 : Stade de France 2009	21,505	Renan Luce	Le Clan des Miros	2,050
42	October 18	Renan Luce	Le Clan des Miros	22,685	Shakira	She Wolf	2,013
43	October 25	Renan Luce	Le Clan des Miros	13,838	Benjamin Biolay	La Superbe	2,561
44	November 1	Michael Jackson	This Is It	55,425	Michael Jackson	This Is It	2,648
45	November 8	Michael Jackson	This Is It	32,842	Kool Shen	Crise de conscience	1,359
46	November 15	Michael Jackson	This Is It	20,282	Robbie Williams	Reality Killed the Video Star	2,951
47	November 22	Diam's Grégory Lemarchal (Compilations Chart)	S.O.S. Rêves	31,050 37,563	Diam's	S.O.S.	3,486
48	November 29	Renaud	Malory Malone, balade irlandaise	34,436	Rihanna	Rated R	1,579
49	December 6	Renaud Vanessa Paradis (Compilations Chart)	Malory Malone, balade irlandaise Best of	21,601 25,522	Black Eyed Peas	The E.N.D.	1,502
50	December 13	Mylène Farmer	N°5 On Tour	57,131	Charlotte Gainsbourg	IRM	3,422
51	December 20	Black Eyed Peas Salut les copains (Compilations Chart)	The E.N.D. 1959–1969 – Les années radio	35,860 47,228	Alicia Keys	The Element of Freedom	1,541
52	December 27	Black Eyed Peas	The E.N.D.		Black Eyed Peas	The E.N.D.	

== Top ten best sales ==
This is the ten best-selling of physical singles, digital singles, physical albums and digital albums in 2009.

=== Singles & Downloads ===
Pos.	Physical singles			Digital singles**		
Pos.	Artist	Title	Sales*	Artist	Title	Sales*
1	Helmut Fritz	"Ça m'énerve"	127,100	Helmut Fritz	"Ça m'énerve"	207,900
2	Magic System & Khaled	"Même pas fatigué !!!"	89,400	David Guetta feat. Akon	"Sexy Bitch"	202,100
3	Mikelangelo Loconte	"Tatoue-moi"	83,700	The Black Eyed Peas	"I Gotta Feeling"	173,600
4	Lady Gaga	"Poker Face"	81,800	Lady Gaga	"Poker Face"	150,600
5	Enrique Iglesias feat. Ciara	"Takin' Back My Love"	77,400	The Black Eyed Peas	"Boom Boom Pow"	150,300
6	Jena Lee	"J'aimerais tellement"	75,700	Pep's	"Liberta"	137,100
7	Pitbull	"I Know You Want Me (Calle Ocho)"	68,300	Jena Lee	"J'aimerais tellement"	137,000
8	Tom Frager	"Lady Melody"	60,200	Pitbull	"I Know You Want Me (Calle Ocho)"	134,600
9	Pussycat Dolls	"I Hate This Part"	56,900	David Guetta feat. Kelly Rowland	"When Love Takes Over"	132,500
10	Charlie Winston	"Like a Hobo"	53,300	Charlie Winston	"Like a Hobo"	125,800

*Only in 2009 **Internet + Mobile Phones

=== Albums & Downloads ===
Pos.	Physical albums			Digital albums		
Pos.	Artist	Title	Sales*	Artist	Title	Sales*
1	Les Enfoirés	Les Enfoirés Font Leur Cinéma	506,500	The Black Eyed Peas	The E.N.D.	30,500
2	Seal	Soul	401,800	Charlie Winston	Hobo	30,000
3	Charlie Winston	Hobo	357,500	Muse	The Resistance	20,300
4	Mozart, l'Opéra Rock	Mozart, l'Opéra Rock	341,700	Mika	The Boy Who Knew Too Much	17,100
5	Grégoire	Toi + Moi	331,400	David Guetta	One Love	16,900
6	The Black Eyed Peas	The E.N.D.	305,500	U2	No Line on the Horizon	16,300
7	U2	No Line on the Horizon	270,700	-M-	Mister Mystère	15,000
8	Muse	The Resistance	256,900	Grégoire	Toi + Moi	14,500
9	Calogero	L'embellie	228,000	Jason Mraz	We Sing. We Dance. We Steal Things.	14,400
10	David Guetta	One Love	226,100	Michael Jackson	The Essential Michael Jackson	14,100

*Only in 2009

== See also ==
- 2009 in music
- List of number-one hits (France)
- List of artists who reached number one on the French Singles Chart
