= NRJ Music Awards 2010 =

Compilation album by Various Artists
- Released: December 21, 2009
- Length: 2:35:05
- Label: EMI, Sony Music, Universal Music

NRJ Music Awards chronology
NRJ Music Awards 2009 (2009)	NRJ Music Awards 2010 (2009)

NRJ Music Awards 2010 is a 2009 compilation album by NRJ.

Every year the French music station publishes a compilation of the best songs of the year. This album contains 42 French and international songs that have enjoyed some success in France in 2009. Artists nominated for the ceremony of the NRJ Music Awards 2010 are also included in this compilation.

A special edition is available with a DVD containing 24 music videos.

Like every year, 0.15 euro per album sold is transferred to "Fondation Nrj Institut de France", created by Jean-Paul Baudecroux, which funds medical research in neuroscience.

In France, the compilation debuted directly in first place of French Compilations Albums Chart (number-one album) on the issue date January 3, 2010. If charts of albums and compilations were merged, the compilation would be number one; it has sold over 46,651 copies while The Black Eyed Peas have sold 14,855 copies of the album The E.N.D.. For four weeks, sales of the compilation were much higher than The E.N.D..

== Track listing ==
- Disc 1
1. "Meet Me Halfway" by The Black Eyed Peas – 3:46
2. "Bodies" by Robbie Williams – 4:02
3. "Russian Roulette" by Rihanna – 3:48
4. "Rain" by Mika – 3:38
5. "I Want to Know What Love Is" by Mariah Carey – 3:38
6. "Enfants Du Désert" by Diam's – 5:35
7. "Paparazzi" by Lady Gaga – 3:28
8. "Où je vais" by Amel Bent – 3:41
9. "Kick the Bucket" by Charlie Winston – 2:41
10. "Give Me That Love" by Tom Frager – 2:57
11. "Heavy Cross" by Gossip – 4:04
12. "Comme des Enfants" by Cœur de pirate – 2:46
13. "She Wolf" by Shakira – 3:07
14. "You Don't Know" by Milow – 2:45
15. "Breathe Gentle" by Tiziano Ferro featuring Kelly Rowland – 3:40
16. "21 Guns" by Green Day – 5:23
17. "3" by Britney Spears – 3:26
18. "Ta Main" by Grégoire – 3:31
19. "Funhouse" by Pink – 3:25
20. "Fuck You" by Lily Allen – 3:40
21. "I Like The Way You Love Me" by Michael Jackson – 4:17
- Disc 2
1. "Memories" by David Guetta featuring Kid Cudi – 3:29
2. "J'Aimerais Tellement" by Jena Lee – 3:52
3. "Stereo Love" by Edward Maya featuring Vika Jigulina – 3:04
4. "Dance 4 Me" by Prince – 4:58
5. "Cry Cry" by Oceana – 3:14
6. "Get on Your Boots" by U2 – 3:25
7. "Doesn't Mean Anything" by Alicia Keys – 3:54
8. "After Tonight" by Justin Nozuka – 3:59
9. "Au bord de l'eau" by Gérald de Palmas – 3:21
10. "On And On (On Se Donne)" by Agnes – 3:49
11. "L'assasymphonie" by Florent Mothe – 3:48
12. "Laisse-toi aller bébé " by Collectif Métissé – 3:19
13. "Je te promets" by Zaho – 3:49
14. "Broken Strings" by James Morrison featuring Nelly Furtado – 4:10
15. "Apprends-moi" by Superbus – 4:07
16. "Plus que tout" by Christophe Willem – 3:43
17. "Sans dire un mot" by Emmanuel Moire – 3:30
18. "Ce qui me touche" by Christopher Stills – 3:35
19. "Ça m'énerve" by Helmut Fritz – 3:38
20. "Automatic" by Tokio Hotel – 3:16
21. "I Know You Want Me (Calle Ocho)" by Pitbull – 3:42
- DVD (Music Videos)
1. "Meet Me Halfway" by The Black Eyed Peas
2. "Russian Roulette" by Rihanna
3. "J'aimerais tellement" by Jena Lee
4. "Paparazzi" by Lady Gaga
5. "Apprends-moi" by Superbus
6. "Stereo Love" by Edward Maya featuring Vika Jigulina
7. "Où je vais" by Amel Bent
8. "3" by Britney Spears
9. "Kick the Bucket" by Charlie Winston
10. "Cry Cry" by Oceana
11. "Heavy Cross" by Gossip
12. "You Don't Know" by Milow
13. "Doesn't Mean Anything" by Alicia Keys
14. "Lady Melody" by Tom Frager and Gwayav'
15. "Comme des enfants" by Cœur de pirate
16. "Funhouse" by Pink
17. "After Tonight" by Justin Nozuka
18. "Evacuate the Dancefloor" by Cascada
19. "Ça m'énerve" by Helmut Fritz
20. "Ta Main" by Grégoire
21. "She Wolf" by Shakira
22. "I Know You Want Me (Calle Ocho)" by Pitbull
23. "Fuck You" by Lily Allen
24. "Memories" by David Guetta featuring Kid Cudi

== Chart and sales ==
=== Peak positions ===
Chart (2010)	Peak position
Belgian Compilations Albums Chart (Wallonia)	1
French Compilations Albums Chart	1
French Digital Albums Chart	3
Swiss Albums Chart	1

=== Year-end charts ===
Chart (2010)	Peak position
Belgian (Wallonia) Compilations Chart	1
French SNEP Albums Chart	25
Swiss Compilations Chart	13

=== Certifications ===
Country	Certification	Date
Belgium	Gold	21 May 2010
France	Platinum	23 December 2009

== Release history ==
Region	Date	Format
France	21 December 2009	Digital download
France	26 December 2009	CD album
