= OPC =

OPC may refer to:

== Architecture and engineering ==
- Optical proximity correction
- Ordinary Portland cement
- Organic Photo Conductor, an element used for, among other applications, photocopier and laser printer drums.

== Computing ==
- Open Packaging Conventions, a container-file technology created by Microsoft to store a combination of XML and non-XML files
- Open Platform Communications (formerly "OLE for Process Control")
  - OPC Foundation, a related consortium
- Operations Planning and Control, from Tivoli Software, known as IBM Tivoli Workload Scheduler
- Optimized Power Control, a method to adjust laser power when writing optical media.
- Other peoples' computers, reference to privacy issues of cloud computing data being on somebody else's computer rather than your own and potential security issues.

== Medicine and natural sciences ==
- Ocean Prediction Center
- Oligodendrocyte precursor cell
- Oligomeric proanthocyanidin
- Oropharyngeal cancer

== Social matters, politics and government ==
- Obama Presidential Center
- (Federal) Office for the Protection of the Constitution, a translation of the German name Bundesamt für Verfassungsschutz
- Office of Policy Coordination, a secret U.S. government unit, 1948–1952
- Office of the Parliamentary Counsel (United Kingdom)
- Office of the Privacy Commissioner of Canada
- Online Party of Canada
- Ontario Progressive Conservative Party, Conservative political party in the province of Ontario
- Oodua Peoples Congress, militant Yoruba nationalist organization situated in Nigeria
- Organisation pour la prévention de la cécité (Organisation for the Prevention of Blindness), a French blindness charity working in Africa
- Orthodox Presbyterian Church, a confessional Reformed Christian denomination
- Ottawa People’s Commission on the Convoy Occupation, Ontario, Canada
- Overseas Press Club, a journalists' organization in New York City
- Overdose prevention centers, otherwise known as Supervised injection sites

== Other ==
- Offshore Patrol Cutter
- Ontario Police College
- O-Pee-Chee, a Canadian sports card company
- Ontario Pioneer Camp, in Huntsville, Ontario, Canada
- Opel Performance Center, a division of car manufacturer Opel
- Optional Payment Charge, a surcharge applied when paying by credit card for airline flights
- Organic photoconductor drum, used in photocopiers and printers
- One Person Company, a category of Limited company
