= Zhang Bin =

Zhang Bin may refer to:

- Zhang Bin (Later Zhao) (died 323), official under Shi Le who founded Later Zhao
- Zhang Lingsheng (1863–?), born Zhang Bin, Chinese Christian missionary
- Benjamin Zhang Bin (born 1974), Chinese manhua artist
- Zhang Bin (political strategist), 21st-century Chinese government official and business person

== Sportspeople ==
- Zhang Bin (basketball) (born 1961), Chinese basketball player-coach
- Zhang Bin (pentathlete) (born 1969), Chinese pentathlete
- Zhang Bin (equestrian) (born 1973), Chinese equestrian
- Zhang Ying Bin, Paralympic athlete from China
