= Love and Deepspace =

2024 mobile game

- Promotional visual in 2025
- Developer: Papergames
- Publishers: CHN: Papergames; WW: Infold Games
- Series: Mr. Love
- Engine: Unity
- Platforms: Android, iOS
- Release: 18 January 2024
- Genres: Otome, gacha, action role-playing game
- Mode: Single-player

Love and Deepspace (Note: Chinese: 恋与深空; pinyin: Liàn yǔ Shēn kōng) is a Chinese otome mobile game developed by Papergames (with publishing outside mainland China under Infold Games). The game is a spin-off of Mr Love: Queen's Choice and released as the second installment of the Mr. Love series. It was released on Android and iOS on 18 January 2024. The game has received generally positive reviews and achieved commercial success.

== Gameplay ==
Love and Deepspace is an otome game rendered in 3D graphics. The player takes control of a female Deepspace Hunter, whose name, appearance, and voice can be customized by the player. The game is a live service game that uses a gacha system known as "wishes", where the player is able to randomly draw cards known as "memories" featuring each of the five companions. While the game is free-to-play, in-app purchases can be made for extra currency and character costumes. The story is told in a visual novel format, with several fully-voiced 3D cutscenes included.

The player is able to interact with the companions in the game through "dates", which consists of the Kitty Cards and claw machine mini games, as well as special audio and visual stories unlockable through acquiring specific memories. Special types of stories, known as "myths", are only accessible through limited-run memories and reveal important plot points related to the protagonist's personal history with the companions. Affinity with the companions can be raised through leveling up memories, reading and listening to their stories, and interacting with their messages. In addition to dates, the player can also spend time with any companion in real-time with activities such as studying and exercising. The version 3.0 update on 18 January 2025 introduced a menstrual cycle tracker.

The player can engage in combat with one of the companions through action role-playing gameplay elements to fight extraterrestrial beings called Wanderers. Combat is integrated into the main story of the game and offers rewards during events. Combat is also used to farm items to upgrade memories, as well as optional story missions in listed in the UNICORNS Operations and Abyssal Chaos sections. Teams are built using the Stellactrum system, where memories of one companion are equipped based on color compatibility with the field. A maximum of two Solar type memories can be chosen. Certain Solar memories form a Memory Pair that allows for more battle capabilities. Rare, limited-run memory pairs allow the player to partner up with a more powerful version of one of the companions. Companions can be powered up through equipping and leveling up Protocores.

The version 5.0 update on 31 December 2025 introduced a fully customizable home that can be decorated by the player and visited by the love interests.

== Synopsis ==
=== Setting and characters ===
Love and Deepspace takes place in the fictional Linkon City, where in the year 2034, a Deepspace Tunnel opened up in the area, leading extraterrestrial beings known as Wanderers to ravage the area in an event known as the Chronorift Catastrophe. In response, the Hunters Association was established and has protected the city ever since, using special abilities called Evol to defend themselves. The main antagonist in the game is EVER, a biotechnological research organization.

The female protagonist is a newly inaugurated Deepspace Hunter working on the UNICORNS team with the Resonance Evol, which allows her to amplify other people's Evol skills and perform team attacks. The love interests in the game consist of Xavier, Zayne, Rafayel, Sylus, and Caleb, who all have their own Evol and a personal conflict against EVER. Special stories unlocked through achieving certain memories reveal that each of the companions were lovers with the protagonist in several of her past and future lives.

Xavier is a Deepspace Hunter and the protagonist's co-worker, who she meets on the first day of her job, using the Light Evol to fight. Xavier is from the future and the prince of the planet Philos. He is also a member of the Backtrackers, a group of Philosians who had traveled back in time to find solutions to prevent Philos and his version of the protagonist from dying. Zayne is the protagonist's childhood friend and primary physician with the Ice Evol; though he has no memories of his previous lives, he regularly has nightmares from a parallel version of himself called Dawnbreaker. He is also an emissary of the god Astra. Rafayel is a painter with the Fire Evol who employs the protagonist as his bodyguard. He is later revealed to be a Lemurian, an ancient race of merfolk, who are hunted by humans. Rafayel is also a sea god who created a bond with one of the protagonist's previous incarnations; because he can only revive the Lemurian civilization by killing and taking her heart, he actively attempts to find ways to revive it without her death.

Later updates in Love and Deepspace added Sylus and Caleb as love interests. Sylus, introduced in the version 2.0 update, is the leader of the crime organization Onychinus who resides in the N109 zone, a crime-infested location outside of Linkon City that was destroyed from the Chronorift Catastrophe. He uses the Energy Evol. Sylus is revealed to be part of a race of dragons who is cursed to kill the protagonist. Caleb is the protagonist's adopted older brother with the Gravity Evol. (Note: The original version and Asian-language localizations refer to Caleb as the protagonist's adopted older brother; however, the English localization refers to him as her childhood friend.) He was initially seen early in the story as a non-playable character in the main story campaign and seemingly dies shortly after his introduction. The version 3.0 update reintroduces him as a love interest, where he is the colonel of the Farspace Fleet. As a child, Caleb remembers that he and the protagonist were both part of EVER's human experiments, leading him to designate himself as her protector. Since being revived by EVER, Caleb has a Toring Chip implanted in him, which the protagonist feels is related to his change in personality.

=== Plot ===
In 2048, 14 years after the Chronorift Catastrophe, the protagonist is initiated as a new Deepspace Hunter and begins fighting Wanderers, who leave behind energy crystals called Protocores. Shortly after, the protagonist's family home is bombed, killing her adoptive family. Her adoptive grandmother, Josephine, leaves behind secret files revealing that she had been involved in illegal human experimentation, where a piece of a rare and powerful Protocore called the Aether Core had been fused to the protagonist's heart. The protagonist learns that she has become a target by EVER, who aim to use the Aether Core to explore the Deepspace Tunnel and seek immortality.

=== Chapters ===
The main story is told in several chapters that are updated at least yearly.

No.	Title	Original release date
1	"Under Deepspace"	January 18, 2024
On her first day working as a Deepspace Hunter, the protagonist meets Xavier, her co-worker, and Rafayel. For her first mission, she, with Zayne, investigates Raymond, whose behavior has become erratic from a painting. Learning that Rafayel is its painter, she becomes acquainted with him and he employs her as his bodyguard. After her family home is bombed and seemingly kills Caleb and her grandmother Josephine, Zayne reveals through Josephine's files that the protagonist is targeted for having an Aether Core implanted in her heart as a child. With clues from Xavier, the protagonist believes that the N109 zone is behind her family's murder and sneaks into it with Rafayel's help.
2	"Long-Awaited Revelry"	July 15, 2024
The protagonist meets Sylus and explores the N109 zone, learning that it was once inhabited by the Gaia Research Center.
3	"Prologue to Tomorrow"	September 30, 2024
The protagonist is sent on a mission to safeguard an Aether Core and stop EVER, with the option of supporting three different cases: "Thorns Under The Moon"; "Land of Secret Flames"; "Voyage Of The Outcast"
4	"Homecoming Wings"	January 22, 2025
For her next mission, the protagonist travels to Skyhaven in order to infiltrate the Farspace Fleet, only to discover that Caleb is alive and is the fleet's colonel. Meanwhile, after an explosion in the Cascade District, the protagonist locates Kevi, who is hiding a special Protocore. Determined to hide him from the Farspace Fleet, the protagonist plans to help him escape to the Hunters Association in Linkon City with Zayne; however, her plan fails after Caleb intervenes, and Kevi is taken into the Farspace Fleet's custody. While investigating, the protagonist learns that Wanderers were once humans affected by the Protocore Syndrome, while growing frustrated with Caleb's increasingly protective nature at the same time. At the end of the chapter, it is revealed that both Kevi and Caleb have Toring Chips implanted in them by Professor Lucius.
5	"Death and Rebirth"	May 19, 2025
Concerned about EVER, the Hunters Association decide to move their Spatial Core, a powerful Aether Core, to a different location, but they are attacked by EVER operatives and the protagonist accidentally absorbs it into her own body. Curious about her origins, the protagonist returns to N109 to investigate the Gaia Research Center, where she finds Dimitri, one of Josephine's former co-workers. Dimitri reveals that the protagonist is an astral being born from the Deepspace Tunnel; her birth was the cause for the Wanderers appearing and the Chronorift Catastrophe. When he attempts to kill her and send her back through the Deepspace Tunnel, the protagonist realizes she is connected to the life cycle of the planet.
6	"To Our Yesterday"	January 2, 2026
7	"Erratic Flux"	September 17, 2026

== Development and release ==
Papergames first announced that Love and Deepspace was in development on 23 October 2020 through a promotional trailer. Pre-registrations for the game opened on 2 November 2023, and a closed beta test was offered to a limited audience from 15 December 2023 to 21 December 2023. Love and Deepspace was released globally on Android and iOS on 18 January 2024. The game was released as a spin-off to Mr Love: Queen's Choice and as the second installment to the Mr. Love series. Papergames also marketed Love and Deepspace as the "first 3D otome game" in China.

Lizi, the creator of Love and Deepspace, stated in 2025 that the original objective of Papergames was to create a 3D game that "would be well-received." In creating Love and Deepspace, Papergames decided on a science fiction setting, as it was popular in 2018 and 2019, but also decided to add romance elements to create an "interesting clash" of genres. The game uses 3D capture to make the characters "life-like" and a love interest generally takes around two years to design.

In order to create a more "immersive" experience, Papergames included as many activities as possible that were similar to real-life romantic experiences, such as chatting with a love interest and playing games together. Lizi also stated that the combat system was integrated into Love and Deepspace as the idea of "fighting side by side" was "crucial" in the concept of the game. She stated that the idea came from how people in relationships view themselves as equals, and that it represented the experience of "two people facing life's challenges together."

Version 2.0, subtitled "Opposing Visions", was released as part of Love and Deepspace's half-year anniversary on 15 July 2024 and introduced Sylus as a playable character. Version 3.0, subtitled "Cosmic Encounter", was released on 31 December 2024 as part of the game's first-year anniversary, with Caleb introduced as a playable character on 22 January 2025 during the second update, "Cosmic Encounter Part 2". Version 4.0, subtitled "Witnessed By Deepspace", was released on 3 July 2025. Version 5.0, subtitled "2nd Anniversary", was released on 31 December 2025. Version 6.0, titled "A Shattered Quiet", was launched on 9 July 2026.

=== Music ===
The version 1.0 theme song of Love and Deepspace, which inspires the game's title, is sung by Sarah Brightman. Brightman describes the song as "exud[ing] a mysterious and ethereal ambience ... tinged with a little bit of melancholy." According to Brightman, she "adopted the perspective of a cosmic observer, or you could say a wandering poet, infusing it with a sense of cosmic mystery and the notion of transcending the river of time". The version 2.0 theme song titled "Visions opposées", is sung by Mikelangelo Loconte and produced in collaboration with the original creators behind Mozart, l'opéra rock. The version 3.0 theme song is a Chinese song titled "Cosmic Encounter", performed by vocalist Wu Bixia. The version 4.0 theme song titled "Witnessed by Deepspace", is performed by Angela Zhang.

== Reception ==
=== Critical reception ===
Reception

Review scores
Publication	Score
Pocket Gamer	4/5
RPGFan	81/100

Love and Deepspace has gained popularity worldwide since its global launch. Its download numbers surpassed 10 million by the third day of its launch, and by 2025, 50 million players were registered worldwide. GameSpot listed Love and Deepspace as one of the best games of 2025, praising it for its interactivity. Famitsu praised the inclusion of the home feature in the version 5.0 update. However, IGN criticized the game for the lighting issues for dark-skinned character customizations.

=== Commercial performance ===
In Japan, Sensor Tower reported that it was the most downloaded and highest-grossing interactive story game from January to September 2024, amassing nearly $30 million. As of March 2025, the game has an accumulated global revenue of over $500 million on the Google Play Store and Apple's App Store, with markets outside of China accounting for 40% of the total revenue, based on data from analytics firm Sensor Tower. Studies attribute the success in revenue to both the blend in 3D and ethereal games elements, as well as the 'SHEconomy', since the game is realistic and caters to women's needs and desire for equality, respect and independence.

According to market research reports, Love and Deepspace ranked second globally among anime-style mobile games in 2025, with an estimated revenue of approximately US$360 million. The game outperformed several established titles in the genre and has been cited as a commercially successful example of an otome game in the global mobile games market.

=== Cancellation of Valko ===
External videos
- Promotional media for Valko
- "Chasing Night", the first teaser for Valko, originally appearing at the end of the Supermoon Countdown livestream on 22 June 2026 (via GameTrailers)

Valko, a new love interest, was revealed on 22 June 2026 and originally planned to be launched as part of the version 6 update on 9 July 2026. The character was described to be a werewolf and the CEO of EonCore Technologies, as well as being able to use the Metallization Evol.

The announcement received heavy fan backlash, particularly from Chinese players who were concerned over how Valko's inclusion would affect future story content and banners for the existing love interests. Valko's character design was also criticized by Chinese players for not appealing to Chinese beauty standards. The players also alleged that Valko was linked to an in-game anecdote titled "A-0731", perceiving the title to be a reference to Unit 731. Over 200,000 complaints were filed on WeChat, and several Chinese players had cow dung delivered to Papergames' building in protest. In addition to fan criticism, the Chinese government condemned Valko, perceiving his storyline as glorifying sexual assault and home intrusion against women.

On 30 June 2026, Papergames canceled Valko's launch, stating that they would not be adding any further love interests in the future and would instead be focusing on the current love interests. Valko's cancellation led to a widespread negative reaction from global players, with several petitions, protests, and boycotts from fans demanding a reversal of the decision and to reinstate Valko's inclusion to the game. Pocket Gamer and The Mary Sue criticized Papergames' handling of the situation, as they described that neither side of the playerbase were satisfied. In part due to the incident, the game's global revenue fell by 68% excluding Chinese app platforms, from $38 million in June 2026 to $10 million in July 2026.

=== Accolades ===
Love and Deepspace won the Best Mobile Game in 2025 Gamescom Awards. This marks the first time in history that an otome game has been nominated for and received an award at Gamescom. At the 2025 NYX Game Awards, Love and Deepspace received two honors in the Mobile Game category: Best Experience (Grand) and Best Game Design (Gold).

== Legal actions ==
On 26 August 2024, Papergames issued a statement demanding the removal of a diss track by Chinese rapper Pact, which it said contained unauthorized use of gameplay footage with distorted and derogatory remarks, and would take legal actions on this matter. After the statement, Pact deleted the video and re-released a version with no gameplay footage, though the video would be deleted again later. This first court session was conducted on 14 January 2025 at the Yangpu District People's Court of Shanghai. On 25 April 2026, Love and Deepspace issued a statement announcing that it had won the lawsuit against singer PACT for defamation and other related claims, and released the court judgment. The final ruling upheld the original verdict. The statement also stated that PACT had not apologized in accordance with the judgment. At 8:00 p.m. that day, PACT issued a public apology.
