= Saule (singer) =

Belgian singer-songwriter

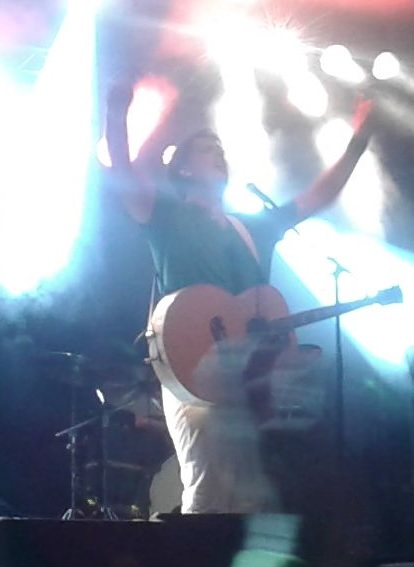
- Saule at Les Francofolies de Spa (2017)

Background information
- Born: Baptiste Lalieu; September 25, 1977 (age 49); Belgium
- Genres: Fusion music, folk rock
- Occupations: Singer, songwriter
- Instrument: Vocals
- Years active: 2005–present
- Label: 30 février
- Website: www.saule.be

Baptiste Lalieu (better known as Saule, sometimes stylized SAULE in all capital letters, born 25 September 1977) is a Belgian singer-songwriter who has found recognition and chart success with his single "Dusty Men" (featuring Charlie Winston) followed by his album Géant, that includes French music with Anglo-Saxon rock sound and country music influences. He is signed to the "30 février" record label.

Saule started writing music releasing his first EP, Saule, of four tracks on "30 février" in November 2005, followed by his first album Vous êtes ici in March 2006 on the same label with distribution rights to the Bang label. The January 2009 album Western with eleven titles and four bonus tracks with heavy traditional country music influences was also marketed in France and Switzerland through Polydor in addition to Belgium. Géant, released in November 2012, has had chart success in France. Saule later ventured into acting, starring in the film The Benefit of the Doubt (2017), which earned him a Magritte Award nomination in the category of Most Promising Actor.

== Discography ==
=== Albums ===
Title	Details	Peak positions	
Title	Details	BEL (Wa)	FRA
Vous êtes ici	Release date: March 2006; Label: 30 février; Distribution: Bang	25	—
Western	Release date: January 2009; Label: 30 février; Distribution: Polydor / Universal	2	—
Géant	Release date: November 2012; Label: 30 février; Distribution: 62 TV	8	80
L'éclaircie	Release date: 18 November 2016; Label: Le Label/PIAS	17	—
Dare-Dare	Release date: 18 June 2021; Label: Le Label/PIAS	3	—
La source	Release date: 16 January 2026; Label: Blue Milk Records	29	—

=== EPs ===
- Saule EP (November 2005)

=== Singles ===
Year	Single	Peak positions			Album
Year	Single	BEL (Wa)	BEL (Fl)	FRA	Album
2008	"Personne"	8 (Ultratip)	—	—	Western
2012	"L'économie des mots"	2 (Ultratip)	—	—	Géant
2012	"Mieux nous aimer encore"	—	28 (Ultratip)	—	Géant
2012	"Dusty Men" (feat. Charlie Winston)	10 (Ultratop)	—	13	Géant
2016	"Comme"	29	—	—	Non-album singles
2017	"Respire (Breathe)"	49	—	—	Non-album singles
2024	"Petite gueule" (with Lovelace)	47	—	—	Non-album singles

=== Soundtracks ===
- Cow-boy (soundtrack of film directed by Benoît Mariage) (December 2007)
