= Make Way (Charlie Winston album) =

Studio album by Charlie Winston
- Released: 2007
- Genre: Folk
- Length: 53:51
- Producer: Autoproduced

Charlie Winston chronology
Make Way (2007)	Hobo (2009)

Make Way is the first album by British singer-songwriter Charlie Winston. It was released in 2007.

== Track listing ==
1. Like A Hobo (5:07)
2. Generation Spent (3:37)
3. Boxes (4:35)
4. Nine Year Old Friend (3:33)
5. My Life As A Duck (4:47)
6. I Love Your Smile (4:58)
7. Yes! (4:05)
8. Life's A Bitch (4:55)
9. Can We Do It? (4:16)
10. Calling Me/Gone Gone (13:59)
