= Solal =

French singer (born 1962)

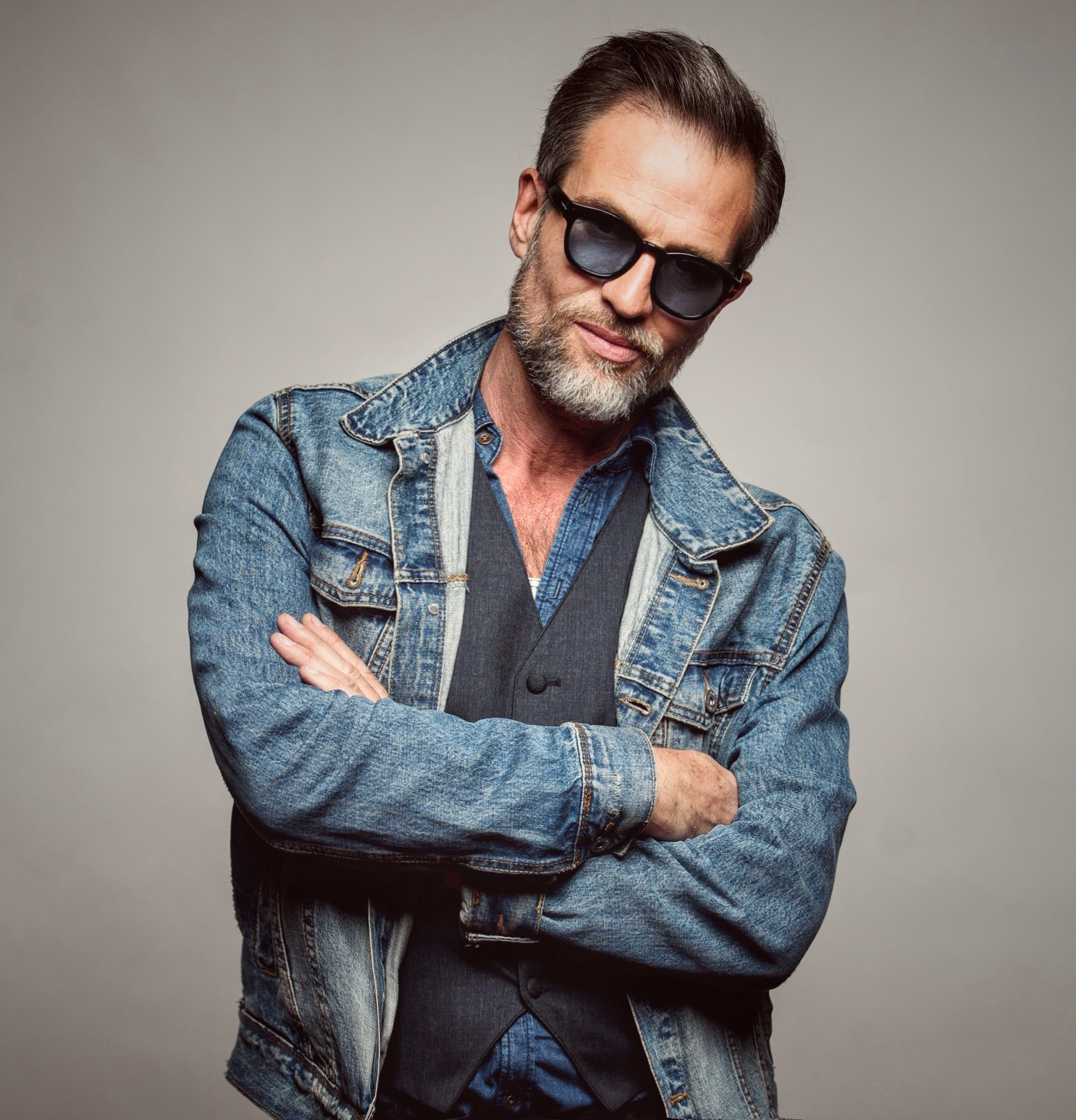
- Portrait of Solal

Background information
- Also known as: Laurent Solal, Solal
- Born: Laurent Morhain; September 29, 1962 (age 63); Lorient, France
- Origin: France
- Years active: 1985–present

Solal (real name Laurent Morhain), born on September 29, 1962, in Lorient, is a French singer, known for his roles in musical theatre.

== Biography ==
Solal was discovered by Michel Sardou in 1985, and he obtained his first contract with the label Tréma two years later. In the 1990s, he played the role of Ziggy in Michel Berger's Starmania. In 2000, he played Tristan in the musical Tristan et Yseult by Pierre Cardin, and was featured on the cast recording.

In 2008, he was cast as Leopold Mozart in Mozart, l'opéra rock, produced by Dove Attia and Albert Cohen. On the album, he performs the songs "J'accuse mon père", "Quand le rideau tombe", and "Penser l'impossible".
