= Dusty Men =

Single by Saule featuring Charlie Winston

from the album Géant
- Released: 4 November 2012
- Recorded: 2012
- Genre: Soul, country, dance
- Length: 3:25
- Label: 30 Février / 62TV
- Songwriters: Baptiste Lalieu, Charlie Winston

Saule singles chronology
"Mieux nous aimer encore" (2012)	"Dusty Men" (2012)	"Comme" (2016)

Charlie Winston singles chronology
"Speak to Me" (2012)	"Dusty Men" (2012)	"Lately" (2014)

"Dusty Men" is a duet by Belgian singer-songwriter Saule and English singer-songwriter Charlie Winston. The song was released as a third single from Saule's third studio album Géant (also produced by Charlie Winston) on 4 November 2012. "Dusty Men" reached top 20 positions in Belgium Wallonia, France and Italy. It was certified gold by the Federation of the Italian Music Industry.

== Chart performance ==
=== Weekly charts ===
Weekly chart performance for "Dusty Men"
Chart (2012–2014)	Peak position
Belgium (Ultratop 50 Wallonia)	10
France (SNEP)	13
Italy (FIMI)	15

=== Year-end charts ===
Annual chart rankings for "Dusty Men"
Chart (2013)	Position
Belgium (Ultratop 50 Wallonia)	27
France (SNEP)	51

Chart (2014)	Position
Italy (Musica e dischi)	52
