= Patrice Maktav =

French actor and singer (born 1978)

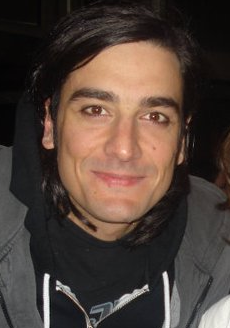
- Patrice Maktav with a fan in Strasbourg, France (March 2011)
- Born: March 1, 1978; Annecy, France
- Occupations: Singer, actor

Patrice Maktav, born 1 March 1978 in Annecy, is a French singer and actor.

== Biography ==
Although he originally aspired to be an actor, Maktav first rose to fame in 2001 as a member of the first season of Star Academy, a French singing competition show, in which he was a semi-finalist. On the show he met and began dating Olivia Ruiz, another semi-finalist, and after participating in the Star Academy Tour he went on to write for her albums La Femme chocolat and "J'aime pas l'amour". In 2002 he released a single called "Anonyme" which found success due to his recent Star Academy fame. He then founded a rock group, Aktarüs. In 2007 he wrote an album that was released digitally in 2009 under the name "MAKTAV". He wrote and acted in humorous sketches that were put online and found work in small theatrical productions until late 2009 when he was cast in Mozart, l'opéra rock in the role of Lorenzo da Ponte. The show had two successful runs in Paris at the Palais des Sports and two successful international tours before its ultimate representations on 7–9 July 2011 in Paris at the Palais Omnisports de Paris-Bercy. In mid-2012 he began appearing on the long-running daily French soap opera Plus belle la vie.

== Discography ==
=== Albums ===
- 2009: Patrice Maktav

== Filmography ==
- 2002: A+ Pollux – a guest at the party
- 2003: Sortie des artistes – Raphael Di Parlo
- 2004: Le monde de Chico, television series
- 2004: Mathilde au matin – l'agresseur
- 2006: L'ellipse – l'illuminé
- 2008: L'amour dans le sang – David Chapel
- 2009: La peau de l'ours – Sergent Frédéric
- 2012: Plus belle la vie – Michaël Malkavian
