= Running Still =

Studio album by Charlie Winston
- Released: 21 November 2011
- Recorded: 2011
- Genre: Folk
- Label: Real World Records / Atmosphériques

Charlie Winston chronology
| Hobo (2009) | Running Still (2011) | Curio City (2015) |

Running Still is the third album by British singer-songwriter Charlie Winston. It was released by Real World Records on 21 November 2011. "Hello Alone" was released as the lead single on 3 October 2011.

The album was certified gold and then platinum by the UPFI in 2012.

== Reception ==
Professional ratings
Aggregate scores
| Source | Rating |
|---|---|
| Metacritic | 60/100 |
Review scores
| Source | Rating |
| The Guardian | 3/5 stars |
| musicOMH | 2.5/5 stars |

Running Still received mixed reviews from critics upon release. On Metacritic, the album holds a score of 60/100 based on 4 reviews, indicating "mixed or average reviews".

== Track listing ==
1. "Hello Alone" (3:18)
2. "Speak to Me" (3:20)
3. "Where Can I Buy Happiness?" (3:43)
4. "The Great Conversation" (4:18)
5. "She Went Quietly" (4:01)
6. "Unlike Me" (3:49)
7. "Until You're Satisfied" (3:24)
8. "Wild Ones" (3:52)
9. "Making Yourself so Lonely" (4:16)
10. "Rockin' in the Suburbs" (3:06)
11. "Summertime Here All Year" (5:03)
12. "Lift Me Gently" (3:43)

== Charts ==
=== Weekly charts ===
| Chart (2011) | Peak position |
|---|---|
| Belgian Albums (Ultratop Flanders) | 95 |
| Belgian Albums (Ultratop Wallonia) | 12 |
| French Albums (SNEP) | 5 |
| German Albums (Offizielle Top 100) | 75 |
| Swiss Albums (Schweizer Hitparade) | 24 |

=== Year-end charts ===
| Chart (2011) | Position |
|---|---|
| French Albums (SNEP) | 64 |

| Chart (2012) | Position |
|---|---|
| Belgian Albums (Ultratop Wallonia) | 73 |
| French Albums (SNEP) | 106 |
