= Benjamin Zhang Bin =

Chinese artist and illustrator

Zhang Bin 本杰明
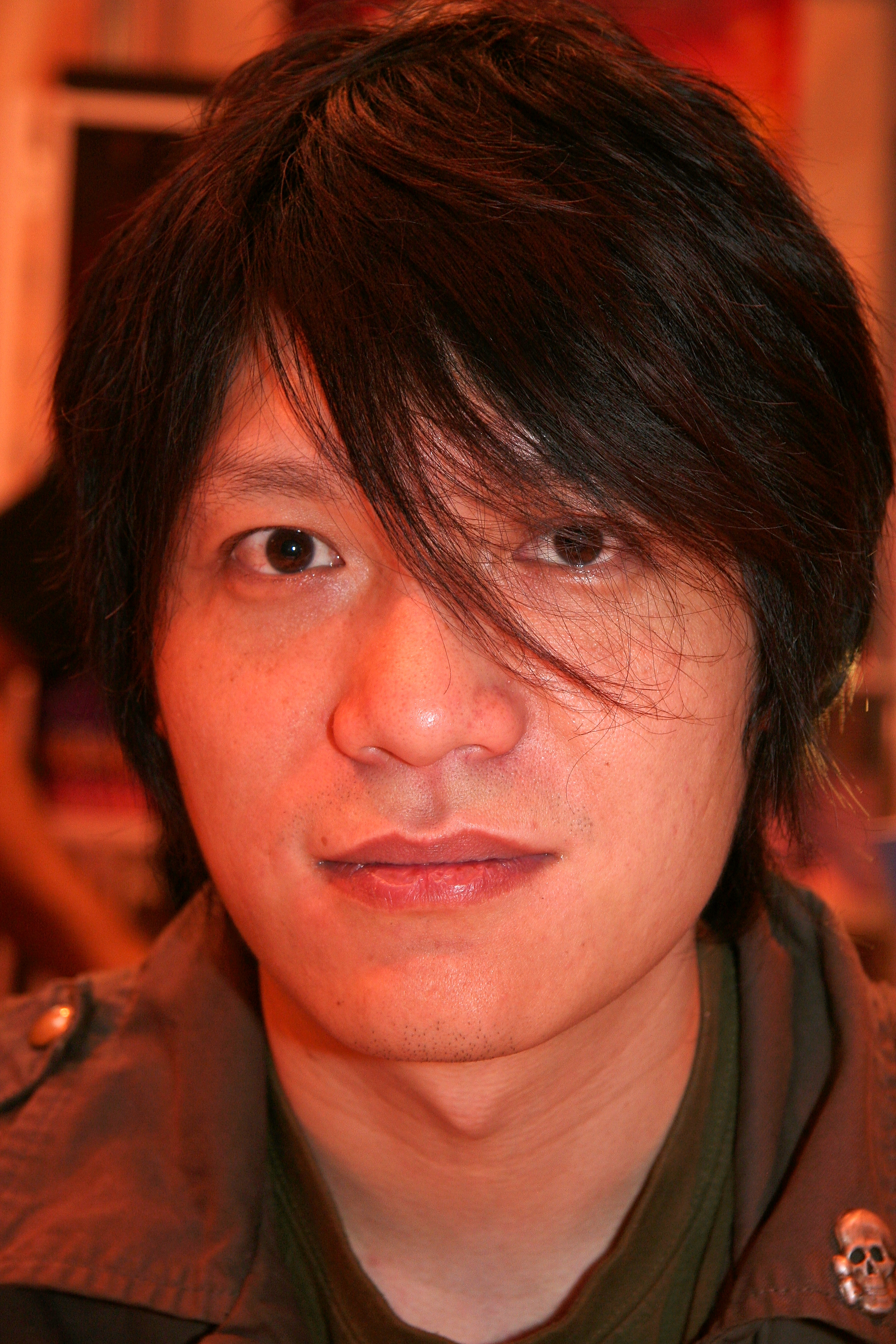
- Zhang Bin at the Salon du livre 2008 (Paris, France)
- Born: May 16, 1974 (age 52) Heilongjiang, China
- Notable works: Orange; Remember

Zhang Bin (Chinese: 张彬; born May 16, 1974) is a mainland Chinese manhua artist and illustrator, who works under the pen name "Benjamin" (本杰明).

Zhang has done variant covers for Marvel Comics and illustrations for the music video to "J'aimerais tellement" with French popstar Jena Lee and the cover for that song's parent album Vous Remercier.

Zhang generally works in digital painting using a pen with a graphics tablet and image editing software (e.g. Corel Painter).

== Selected works ==
=== Comics ===
- One Day (2002)
- Remember (2004)
- Orange (2006)
- Savior (2010)

==== One-shots and additional works ====
- Seven Swords (2007)
- Sky Doll Lacrima Christi #1 (Marvel, 2010)

=== Covers ===
==== Comics covers ====
- X-Men Origins: Emma Frost (Marvel, 2009)
- New Mutants #1-2, #4 (Marvel, 2009)

==== Album covers ====
- Vous Remercier (2009), by Jena Lee

=== Art Books ===
- Io: Art of the Wired (2004)
- Flash (2008)

=== Music Videos ===
- J'aimerais tellement by Jena Lee (2009)
- Je me perds by Jena Lee (2009)
