= Curio City =

Studio album by Charlie Winston
- Released: 26 January 2015
- Genre: Pop, rock
- Label: AFishant Records / Atmosphériques

Charlie Winston chronology
Running Still (2011)	Curio City (2015)	Square 1 (2018)

Curio City is the fourth studio album by English singer-songwriter Charlie Winston. Released on 26 January 2015, the album peaked at number five in Wallonia and at number six on the French Albums Chart.

== Track listing ==
No.	Title	Length
1.	"Wilderness"	4:33
2.	"Truth"	3:40
3.	"Say Something"	3:33
4.	"Fear & Love"	3:26
5.	"Too Long"	3:49
6.	"A Light (Night)"	4:04
7.	"Another Trigger"	3:43
8.	"Lately"	3:52
9.	"Just Sayin'"	4:19
10.	"A Light (Day)"	3:27
11.	"Evening Comes"	3:49
12.	"Stories"	3:39
13.	"Too Long (Radio Edit)"	3:26
14.	"Lately (Tobtok Remix)"	3:47
15.	"Lately (The Avener Rework)"	3:23

== Charts ==
=== Weekly charts ===
Chart (2015)	Peak position
Belgian Albums (Ultratop Flanders)	132
Belgian Albums (Ultratop Wallonia)	5
French Albums (SNEP)	6
Swiss Albums (Schweizer Hitparade)	15

=== Year-end charts ===
Chart (2015)	Position
Belgian Albums (Ultratop Wallonia)	81
French Albums (SNEP)	114

== Release history ==
Region	Date	Format	Label
France	26 January 2015	CD, digital download	AFishant Records
Germany	13 February 2015	CD, LP, digital download	Sony Music
