= Organisation for the Prevention of Blindness =

Blindness organization based in Paris, France

The Organisation for the Prevention of Blindness
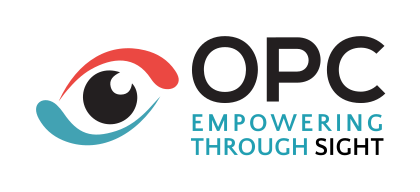
- Formation: 1978
- Type: International nongovernmental organization
- Purpose: Ocular Health in Francophone Africa
- Headquarters: 17, Villa Alésia; Paris 14th Arrondissement
- Official language: French
- President: Professor Serge Resnikoff
- Vice Presidents: Dr Pierre Huguet; Dr Michel Boussinesq; Catherine Hartog
- Secretary General: Dr Christian Bailly
- Treasurer: Dr Alain Auzemery
- Key people: Professor Yves Pouliquen
- Main organ: Board of non-executive directors
- Affiliations: WHO
- Website: opc.ngo

The Organisation for the Prevention of Blindness (French: l'Organisation pour la Prévention de la Cécité, OPC) is an international non-governmental organisation whose actions today focus exclusively on French-speaking countries in Africa. Their mission is to preserve and restore sight amongst some of the most under-privileged communities in the region. The OPC's principal actions concern blindness prevention, treatment and the elimination of blinding diseases, such as onchocerciasis, trachoma, glaucoma and cataracts as well as formal ophthalmological training.

== History ==
The OPC was founded on January 13, 1978, by Christian Monnier. Retired from the banking industry, he decided to work with Professor André Dubois-Poulsen, who was the head of department of the XV-XX Hospital and President of the French Ophthalmological Society and Pierre Aubé, an ex-financial advisor.

Professor Dubois-Poulsen presided over the OPC Board of Directors for eight years and organised its first projects in Africa, notably the Yeleen Program in Mali. Thanks to this project, the OPC became a member of the International Agency for Prevention of Blindness (IAPB)

Over the years, the OPC has greatly increased its number of missions, creating primary eye care networks, and supporting the African Institute of Tropical Ophthalmology (IOTA). Then, under the presidency of Professor Jean Langlois, the ex-Head of department of the CHU of Rouen, and thanks to Dr. Marcel Chauvet, the medical Inspector General, onchocerciasis, or "river blindness", control in Africa was elevated to high priority. Onchocerciasis control is still being carried out in conjunction with other NGOs and the World Health Organization. Links were also established with the Ministry of Cooperation and Development.

During this period of the OPC's history, a program to create an ophthalmological service in at GRALL Pediatric Hospital in Saigon (Vietnam) was successfully led for five years.

In 1997, Professor Langlois became Honorary President, giving the position of President to Professor Yves Pouliquen, ex-Head of the Ophthalmological Department of l'Hôtel-Dieu in Paris, member of the Academy Française from 2001, and member of the French National Academy of Medicine and the International Academy of Ophthalmology.

From 1997, Professor Pouliquen reinforced the importance of onchocerciasis and trachoma control in West Africa with the Ministry of Foreign Affairs. They also developed technical support for the treatment of cataracts. Dr Dominique Négrel, executive director of the OPC, expert in ophthalmological public health and in the implementation of eye care structures, contributed greatly to the OPC's involvement in training health workers in ophthalmology.

Additionally, the OPC implemented a support plan to help combat age-related macular degeneration (ARMD) by providing several centres with powerful diagnostic materials integrated into the resources. This plan was led forward by OPC Vice-president Professor Christian Corbé, medical Inspector General and founding President of the Representative Association of Low-Vision Initiatives, Dr. Jean-François Ceccon, ophthalmologist, administrator and ex-Chief Programs Officer of the OPC, and Denis Brillard, OPC administrator and Director of the Welcome centre and Head of the rehabilitation for the blind in Nîmes, ARAMAV.

In 2006, the OPC debuted a prevention program for diabetic retinopathy in collaboration with the Valentin Haüy Association, and the AP-HP (Public Hospitals' Public Assistance) OPHDIAT network. 16 centres were equipped in the Paris region and in Province (the province).

The same year, at the initiative of the OPC, a think-tank composed of 5 Parisian hospitals participated in a network constitution project (WTF) concerning low vision in Île de France.

In 2010, after 12 years as OPC President, Professor Pouliquen gave the reins to Nathalie Brunet, a jurist and head of a French company that is a world leader in its field. The OPC developed its missions in French-speaking countries, mainly Africans ones, but also in Haiti and Moldova as well as in France.

In 2011, Dr Serge Resknioff became President of the OPC. He is the former head of Prevention of Blindness and Deafness at the WHO and is involved in various organisations associated with blindness prevention. The OPC then decided to refocus its missions on developing countries, particularly in Africa, thus continuing, in its own way, to contribute to a better balance between "countries of the North" and "countries of the South".

In 2020, the OPC is writing a new associative project that defines the framework and the orientations in which the activities carried out will take place, both in terms of the functioning of the associative life and the development of the programs. This associative project corresponds to the institutional platform of reference for the actions carried out in the respect of the founding values of the OPC.

=== The OPC ===
- Has existed since 1978
- Is a recognised charity
- Maintains an official working relationship with the World Health Organization
- Is honoured by the High Patronage of the President of the French Republic: Mr. Giscard d'Estaing, Mr. Mitterrand, Mr. Chirac then Mr. Sarkozy have shown their interest in the work of the OPC
- Is an active member of the global initiative vision 2030 – The Right to Sight;
- Approved The IDEAS Label that attests to the implementation of good practices in governance, financial management and monitoring the effectiveness of its actions.

== The OPC's Ambassadors ==
Many personalities support or supported the OPC. On order of arrival they are:

- Claudie Haigneré: Scientist, Astronaut, former Minister delegate for Research and President of Université Science 1, Sorbonne, Paris.
- Jean-Loup Dabadie: Writer, Journalist, Playwright, Scriptwriter and Member of the French Academy.
- Rokia Traoré: Songwriter, Singer and Guitarist. President of the Passerelle Foundation.
- Chloé Trespeuch: French snowboarder and member of the France national team.
- Emma Bernard: Professional snowboarder, member of the France national team.
- Moh! Kouyaté: Musician, singer, guitarist.
- Ayo: Singer-songwriter and guitarist.
- Mikelangelo Loconte: Singer, songwriter, performer and artistic director. Role of Wolfgang Amadeus Mozart in Mozart, l'Opéra rock.

== Programmes ==
In developing French-speaking African countries, cataracts, trachoma, onchocerciasis and glaucoma are the main causes of visual impairment and blindness. It is also estimated that 80% of causes of loss of vision are avoidable and/or curable. This is why the OPC works with its various partners in the creation, implementation, the follow-up and evaluation of sustainable programs that address the greatest number possible and allow:

- The training of qualified and autonomous ophthalmological human resources at all levels: doctor, nurse, senior technician and community agent;
- The dispensing/distribution of comprehensive eye care of excellent quality;
- The administering of medical treatments to those in need;
- The performing of early screening for eye diseases.

=== Training ===
The OPC sets up training programs for ON (Ophthalmic Nurse) and OCO (Ophthalmic Clinical Officer) level ophthalmic mid-level personnel. There are between 8 and 12 students each academic year.

- Niger: fifth class of OCOs is currently studying.
- Central African Republic: Despite a delay due to the difficult conditions which the country has experienced, the implementation and recruitment of the first class of OCOs has been done in February 2013.
- Mali: renovation of Kayes Hospital which will become the new training site for students of the Higher education degree in ocular health (DESSO). The ophthalmologist currently working in this establishment has received a grant from IOTA (Institut d'Ophtalmologie Tropicale de l'Afrique - African Institute of Tropical Ophthalmology) in order to undertake training to perfect his surgical capacities. The training of primary eye care personnel, which was supposed to begin in Mopti, has been postponed due to recent events in Mali.

=== Continuing Medical Training ===
==== Union of the Comoros ====
Two ophthalmologists have finished their training in Senegal and in Mali and have been placed in public health ophthalmic structures equipped by the OPC at the end of 2011.

==== Mali ====
Two IOTA-enrolled Malian ophthalmologists received grants to train at performing surgeries in a rural environment.

=== Creation and distribution of pedagogical aids in 2012 ===
A library collection made up of ophthalmology specialized books and teaching materials, designed for use by nurses in training (ISO and/or TSO level), have been provided by the OPC for:

Guinea: sent in September 2012

Niger: sent in May 2012

=== Infrastructures & Equipment ===
The OPC upgrades infrastructures designed to provide eye care.

==== Mali (2013) ====
In close partnership with the national programme for blindness control, the equipment and consultation needed to open four community health centers in the regions of Kayes and Bamako were provided and delivered by the OPC.

==== Niger (2013) ====
In partnership with the national programme for blindness control and the Lions Club in Niger, a meeting was organised in December 2013 with an eye to identify the equipment needed for the primary and secondary centers in two regions of the country: Tahoua and Tillabéri.

==== Guinea (2012) ====
Through the partnership between Donka Hospital, the Conakry Urban Community and the OPC, Donka Hospital's ophthalmological department was renovated in September 2012. In November 2012, the OPC installed new equipment, including an operating microscope, cataract and trichiasis kits, wearable magnifying glasses, diagnostic sets, an air conditioner and a generator. Today, the service is open for consultation and for surgical operations. Through the partnership between Siguiri Hospital, the Siguiri Urban Community and the OPC, the hospital's ophthalmological department was renovated in July 2012. The equipment, received by the Conakry Lions (Lions Club), was transported and installed by OPC in September 2012. The service is open for consultation and for surgical operations.

==== Central African Republic (2012) ====
The premises were renovated before beginning the OCO training classes at the General Hospital of Bangui in July 2012.

=== Administering care and other results in 2013 ===
The OPC works to deliver quality and sustainable eye care services to those in need

==== Congo ====
The OPC has been present in the Republic of the Congo since 1998

2013 Results: Supporting the National Programme for Onchocerciasis Control (PLNO):

- 710,456 people treated in 760 villages that were visited. Missions assured by the national team and 209 national health agents (nurses and doctors) trained or retrained by their care, framing 1922 village community distributors.
- A meeting in Brazzaville between the OPC, Sightsavers and the PLNO so as to discuss the progress of executing the onchocerciasis project.

==== Guinea (Guinea-Conakry) ====
The OPC has been present in Guinea since 1993

2013 Results:

- Ophthalmologic consultation centers opened in Siguiri, Kankan and Macenta within the grant agreement of the SightFirst Programme of the Lion Club's international foundation in order to support primary and secondary eye healthcare services, as well as advanced and mobile cataract surgery in the Kankan, N'Zérékoré and Faranah regions.
- 24,000 ophthalmologic consultations were given in the 3 healthcare centers by the OPC (Kankan, Siguiri, Macenta). Grant from the Lions Clubs International Foundation.
- 3,990 operations (cataract, trichiasis).
- Grant agreement for 2 years from the Lions Clubs International Foundation in order to support primary and secondary eye healthcare services and advanced and mobile cataract surgery in the Kankan, N'Zérékoré and Faranah regions.
- Diabetic retinopathy control (training health personnel, information media).
- Onchocerciasis control: continuing under the auspices of the national programmes, where the actions of the agents, extending the initial training provided by the OPC, allows approximately 1.4 million people to be protected.

==== Mali ====
The OPC has been present in Mali since 1981

2013 Results:

- Onchocerciasis control: the activities continue in all households under the authority of the national programmes, where the agents' actions are extending the initial training provided by the OPC, enabling more than 3,500,000 people to be protected at all times.
- 33,000 ophthalmological consultations were given in the three eye healthcare centers by the OPC (Kayes, Sikasso, Mopti).
- 4,800 cataract and trichiasis patients were operated on.
- Diabetic retinopathy control: training health personnel, information media

==== Central African Republic ====
The OPC has been present in Central African Republic since 1994

2013 Results:

- 25,000 consultations.
- 2,705 operations (cataracts and trichiasis).
- Medical and technical support from the General Hospital of Bangui.
- Organising the validation workshop for the National Programme for Trachoma Control integrated into the National Plan for Neglected Tropical Disease Control in collaboration with International Trachoma Initiative (ITI) and Christoffel Blinden Mission (CBM).
- Obtaining funding from the French Development Agency (AFD) targeting necessary supplies and equipment for the National Programme for Trachoma Control.
- Submitting the project for trachoma control with its surgical component to the International Lions Clubs Foundation.
- Submitting the project for trachoma control with the antibiotic component to Sightsavers.

==== Senegal ====
The OPC has been present in Senegal since 1980

2013 Results:

- Pursuing the efforts made to integrate primary eye healthcare in the Tambacounda region with an almost total independence from the national programme of blindness control (2013).
- Onchocerciasis control: covering 82% of the population in the zones which are usually treated. These activities are being followed up under the authority of the national programmes, when the actions of the agents are extending the initial training provided by the OPC, enabling more than 300,000 people to be protected at all times.
- 4,100 consultations (2012)
- 800 operations (2012)

==== Chad ====
The OPC has been present in Chad since 1997

2013 Results:

- Support

Medical and technical support given to hospital centres in Moundou and Mongo, for the ophthalmology department of the National General Reference Hospital.

- Signing of the national plan for trachoma control done with the OPC's technical input by the Health Minister in the Republic of Chad.
- Obtaining funding from Sightsavers for the application of a pilot which includes surgery and the distribution of antibiotics in the Guéra region of Mongo's health district.
- Validation of epidemiological investigations on the prevalence of trachoma carried out between 2001 and 2005 in 9 regions of the country.
- Chad is retained from benefitting from the support from the British agency, Department for International Development (DFID), in order to end cartography of the country then to implement the national plan for the elimination of trachoma.

== Human Resources & partners ==
The OPC's activities are currently being supported by the expertise of numerous professionals who make up the Board of Directors, particularly in the field of ophthalmology, of public eye health, of tropical medicine, of optometry and of epidemiology.

With the aim of leading its missions with professionalism and of being able to respond in the best way to public health issues that confront it, the OPC has built up special relationships with its partners, referring to their fields of expertise. Here are the associations and institutions with which the OPC has collaborated, or still collaborates:

The OPC also works in close collaboration with other international organisations working in the same sector:

- Christofell Blindenmission (CBM)
- Coordination Sud
- Fondation Gouault-Wendling
- Fondation Théa
- International Agency for the Prevention of Blindness (IAPB)
- International Coalition for Trachoma Control (ICTC)
- Institut des Dirigeants et d'Associations & Fondations
- Institut d'ophtalmologie tropicale de l'Afrique (IOTA)
- International Trachoma Initiative (ITI)
- Light for the World
- Lions Club International Foundation
- Prévention Cécité Lions
- Réseau Africain Francophone des Experts du Trachome
- Sight Savers International
- Société Française d'Ophtalmologie
- The End Fund
- Université Internationale Abulcasis des Sciences de la santé (UIASS)

== See also ==
- Blindness
- Onchocerciasis
- Trachoma
