= J'aimerais tellement =

Single by Jena Lee

from the album Vous Remercier
- Released: 6 July 2009
- Genre: Emo R&B; pop
- Length: 3:54
- Label: Mercury, Universal
- Songwriter(s): Jena Lee
- Producer(s): Bustafunk

Jena Lee singles chronology
"J'aimerais tellement" (2009)	"Je me perds" (2010)

Audio sample
- file; help

"J'aimerais tellement" is a 2009 pop and emo R&B song recorded by French singer-songwriter Jena Lee. It is her debut single from her 2009 album Vous Remercier. It managed the feat of becoming number one on French Physical Singles Chart, although it was poorly aired on radio.

== Composition and music video ==
There would be ten versions of the song before it was recorded for the album and released as a single. The music video consisted of an anime by Benjamin, a Chinese artist who produces manga which resemble photographic watercolors.

== Reception ==
Before the physical release of the single, the music video had been viewed on YouTube about four million times and on her official music blog, Jena Lee had more than 50,000 fans. The song was first a success on the physical chart before being most aired on many French music stations. Indeed, it started at number 98 on French Airplay Chart on 9 October 2009, although already released as single, and peaked at number three on 4 December 2009.

About the success of the song, Lee said that she was surprised because there was not much support by radios and that she was pleased to see that the public like her song. As sign of popularity, the song and the music video were both included on the famous compilation NRJ Music Awards 2010.

On the chart edition of 11 October 2009, "J'aimerais tellement" debuted directly atop of the French Physical Singles Chart with 5,361 units and hit a peak of 7,303 units in its ninth week atop. It spent a total of eleven weeks at number one. The song also became number-one on the French Digital Singles Chart on the chart edition of 1 November 2009 with 10,315 downloads and reached its highest weekly sales −13,637 sales- in the chart edition of 15 November 2009. It remained atop for three weeks.

The song achieved mixed success in Belgium (Wallonia), where it appeared in the top 40 for eight weeks and peaked at number 25.

== Cover versions ==
The song was covered by Les Enfoirés on their album 2011: Dans l'œil des Enfoirés, and included in the medley "Troisième Sexe". The song was performed by Grégoire & Kad Merad.

== Track listing ==
- CD single

No.	Title	Length
1.	"J'aimerais tellement"	3:54
2.	"J'aimerais tellement" (instrumental)	3:54

- Digital single

No.	Title	Length
1.	"J'aimerais tellement"	3:54

== Charts ==
=== Weekly charts ===
Chart (2009)	Peak position
Belgian Singles Chart (Wallonia)	25
Eurochart Hot 100 Singles	5
French Digital Singles Chart	1
French Physical Singles Chart	1
Swiss Singles Chart	50

=== Year-end charts ===
Chart (2009)	Position
Eurochart Hot 100	57
French Digital Singles Chart	7
French Physical Singles Chart	6
Chart (2010)	Position
European Hot 100	26
French SNEP Singles Chart	24

== Sales and certifications ==
Country	Provider	Certifications (sales thresholds)	Sales
France	SNEP	Platinum	250,000

== Release history ==
Region	Date	Format
France	6 July 2009	Digital download
France	5 October 2009	CD single
