= Mikelangelo Loconte =

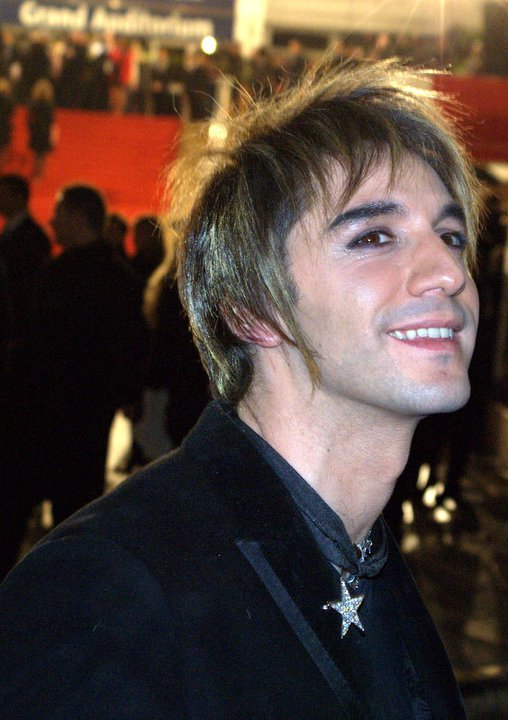

Background information
- Born: Michele Loconte; 5 December 1973 (age 52)
- Origin: Cerignola, Italy
- Genres: Rock, Pop
- Occupations: Singer, actor, composer, musician, artistic director
- Instruments: Piano/Keyboards, drums, guitar
- Years active: 1990–present

Mikelangelo Loconte (born 5 December 1973) is an Italian singer, writer, composer, musician, performer and artistic director. He is best known for his leading role as Wolfgang Amadeus Mozart in the musical Mozart, l'opéra rock. On 25 April 2025, he released his debut solo album, Art Decade.

== Early career ==
Mikelangelo (Michele Loconte) was born in Cerignola in the Province of Foggia, Italy on December 5, 1973.

From an early age, Mikelangelo took part in many TV shows and stage performances. While he was a teenager, he joined the rock band Art Decade a New wave band formed in Cerignola in the mid-1980s, as keyboardist and songwriter. At the age of 21, by performing his original song "Aria", he was pronounced the winner at the Festival degli Sconosciuti by Rita Pavone, broadcast on Rai 2.

In 2001, he performed his song "Ad ogni modo" at the Castrocaro Music Festival, broadcast on Rai 1.

He took his first steps as an actor by participating in the musical Les Nouveaux Nomades, created by Claude Barzotti and Anne-Marie Gaspard. He recorded all the songs in the studio using phonetic writing, as he had little knowledge of French. However, in the end, the budget for the project was never found and the project was not presented to the public.

Mikelangelo lived for nine years in the Belgian city of Liège, where he was discovered by Alec Mansion (member of the band Léopold Nord & Vous). As a multi-instrumentalist (piano, keyboard, guitar, drums), he worked as an artistic director in a large studio (La Chapelle) in Waimes.

In 2002, the Belgian singer Morgane, who represented Belgium in the Eurovision Song Contest 1992, recorded her new single, "On est seul au monde", at studio La Chapelle. On the record, Mikelangelo (under his original name, Michele Loconte) composed both the song and the lyrics to the A-side "On est seul au monde", and composed the song for the B-side "L'homme qui", with lyrics written by Anne-Marie Gaspard. He also arranged the music and performed the synthesizer on the recording. This was his first official release in the french language. Later, he toured with the German band Unix as the singer in several European countries as well as Brazil.

In 2009, Mikelangelo was elected Liégeois de l'année (Liégeois of the year) in the culture category. He was also a member of the French Jury in the Eurovision 2013.

== Mozart, l'opéra rock and musicals ==
Mikelangelo reached star status by portraying Wolfgang Amadeus Mozart in the musical Mozart, l'opéra rock, directed by Dove Attia and Albert Cohen. His first single, "Tatoue-moi", was a number-one hit in France in 2009, topping the SNEP singles chart for five consecutive weeks.

Subsequently, he took part in the symphonic rock concert Mozart, l'opéra rock Le Concert, which toured twice in Eastern Europe (Russia and Ukraine), in February and October 2013. The tour continued in France, Switzerland and Belgium from September 2014, accompanied by a symphony orchestra from Kyiv. In 2017, the show returned to Eastern Europe, with performances in Russia and Ukraine.

He later expanded his international presence through tours in Asia, continuing to portray Mozart. In 2016, he toured South Korea with the production. In January 2018, he made his debut in China with 24 sold-out performances at Shanghai Culture Square. From December 2018 to March 2019, he took part in a larger-scale Chinese tour with 77 performances, attracting a total audience of 112,750. In 2024, he toured more than 20 Chinese cities.

From September 16, 2016 to January 8, 2017, Mikelangelo played the role of Monsieur Loyal in Jean-Jacques Thibaud's circomédie musicale (circus musical) Timéo, directed by Alex Goude, at Casino de Paris.

Mikelangelo has remained active in musical theatre concerts and shows across Europe and Asia. He performed in the French Musical Gala Concert in Shanghai in 2017, and in its international tour in 2023. He has taken part in Les Retrouvailles in France since 2022. He performed in Les Comédies Musicales – Le Concert in 2023 and 2024. In 2026, he returned to the production as a special guest for two performances at the Cirque d'Hiver in Paris.

== Art Decade ==
On 25 April 2025, Mikelangelo Loconte released his debut solo studio album, Art Decade.

Produced by French musician Éric Serra, who is a frequent collaborator with director Luc Besson, the album consists of 10 tracks with a runtime of approximately 38 minutes. The album incorporates elements of rock, New wave and post-punk, with vocals in French, Italian and English. The album is named after his first rock band, and includes a selection of rock songs written since his youth, centered on the theme of self-liberation. Its lead single, "RDV au pont", also produced by Serra, was released on 7 February 2025.

== Solo and duo concerts ==
- 2015: Baby Blues – Spiritual Rock Experience (France)
- 2016: 'La folie des Deux Hommes' Duo Concert (South Korea)
- 2017: Just Between You and Me (South Korea)
- 2017: Mikelangelo Loconte & Florent Mothe Duo Concert (China)
- 2018: In Time Mikelangelo Loconte & Florent Mothe Duo Concert (Russia)
- 2018:'Mood For Love' Mikelangelo Loconte & Florent Mothe Duo Concert (China)
- 2018: 'Underneath' Mikelangelo Loconte & Florent Mothe Duo Concert (China)
- 2019: Neverland (China) – his first solo concert in China, where VIP tickets sold out in 40 seconds
- 2024: 'Art Decade' Live Concert (China) – sold out in 3 minutes

== Charity events ==
Mikelangelo regularly takes part in musical charity events (often in aid of children), such as Une Nuit à Makala with numerous artists. In 2013, he recorded the charity single "Je reprends ma route" for the association "Les Voix de l'Enfant".

He participated in the program "Les grandes voix des comédies musicales chantent pour les enfants hospitalisés" alongside Renaud Hantson, Pablo Villafranca and Lââm, with the single "Un faux départ". He also took part in the show "La Nuit des Hits" in aid of the association "Enfant Star et Match".

With Natasha St-Pier and several other artists, he also participated in the children's music project Dolly Bibble, recording vocals for the song "Life is Love".

Mikelangelo is also an ambassador of the Organisation for the Prevention of Blindness (OPC).

== Jewelry with ClioBlue ==
Mikelangelo designed the "Mikelangelo Collection" in collaboration with the French jewelry brand ClioBlue, which includes rings, necklaces, earrings, a brooch and a leather cuff, with several pieces incorporating his "Art Symbol" motif.

== "Visions opposées" with Love and Deepspace ==
In July 2024, Mikelangelo performed "Visions opposées", the Version 2.0 theme song for the Chinese mobile game Love and Deepspace, written by Dove Attia and composed by Attia and Rod Janois.
