= Ottawa People's Commission =

Canadian organisation

Ottawa People’s Commission
- Formation: 2022
- Headquarters: Centretown, Ottawa, Canada
- Website: www.opc-cpo.ca

The Ottawa People's Commission on the Convoy Occupation (French: Commission populaire d'Ottawa sur l'occupation par le convoi), commonly known as the Ottawa People's Commission (OPC) is a commission managed by the Centretown Community Health Centre, in Ottawa, in the Canadian province of Ontario.

== Activities ==
The Ottawa People’s Commission has published two reports on the 2022 Freedom Convoy, the second of which includes recommendation to all levels of government in Canada. The first report was titled What We Heard, and the second report was titled After the Occupation: Change. The first report was informed by a hearing operated by the commission.
