= Pep's =

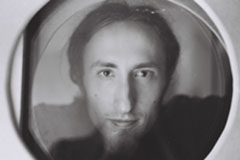
- Pep's

Background information
- Origin: Grenoble, France
- Genres: Rock, R&B, Reggae
- Years active: 2002 –
- Labels: EchoProd
- Website: Official Pep's Website

Pep's is a French artist (as well as a group) based in Grenoble, with musical styles encompassing genres such as rock, R&B, and reggae. The group was formed in 2001. The stage name of singer (and group) comes from a nickname inspired by the lead singer's name: Florian Peppuy. His influences are very diverse, ranging from Led Zeppelin and Noir Désir, to Ben Harper, Otis Redding, and The Fugees.

== Biography ==
Florian Peppuy first picked up the trombone age 6 and a decade later he started composing and performing locally in a group by the name of "Recycled." At the age of 18, he left for Paris, changed his stage name to Pep's and spent two years playing as a Busker in local Bars, and on the streets of Paris. It was around this time, that the group: Pep's was formed.

It consists of bassist and former “Recycled” member Philippe Berruyer, Florian Peppuy's childhood buddy drummer, Alexandre Combeau, a saxophone gold medallist and graduate from the Conservatory of Grenoble, Guillaume Diederichs, a DJ, multi-instrumentalist Dan-Luc Bicrame, and Pesenti Richard, another childhood friend joined as manager of the band.

In 2001, the group self-produced and released their first CD with six tracks named "Follow the Flo". In 2003, after performing at over 300 concerts, Pep's recorded their first studio album, "Smile of the soul" with Fred "Brain" Monestier (Sinsemilia, Mig ..). The lead single, entitled "Liberta" featuring singer Djazia Satour from the group Mig, quickly became a national phenomenon, and increased the band's reputation. Richard Pesenti, the manager as well as a musician in the band, left the group to pursue a solo career, and was replaced in 2005 by Sebastian Michaut, who created and manages the label "Follow Flo."

A maxi "Pending" album was released in 2006. It comprises four titles taken from the band's various live singles, but also two new singles entitled "J'te greenhouse" and "Tristan", a tribute to snowboard champion Tristan Picot, a friend of Pep's, who died in Jackson Hole (U.S.) on January 4, 2003 during an avalanche.

In 2007, Guillaume Alexandre and Combeau Diederichs left the group, to pursue other activities. Guillaume Marocco a drummer from Grenoble, replaced the original drummer. In mid-2007, the group signed a contract artist with the label "Echo Production" created by Mike Inca, the leader of the group Sinsemilia, and after a summer of work, the group released a new album in October 2007, produced by Laurent Guéneau (Khaled, Sinsemilia ...).

Pep's has an eclectic style, which varies from song to song - mainly based around: rock, reggae, soul, funk, jazz and hip-hop.

== Discography ==
=== Albums ===
Source : Pepmusic.com

- 2001 : Suivez Le Flo
1. "Croire"
2. "La petite récolte du jardinier"
3. "Lentement"
4. "Liberta" (original version)
5. "Boum Boum"
6. "Zion"
- 2003 : Au Sourire De L'ame
1. "M'asseoir"
2. "Paname"
3. "Lentement"
4. "Le soleil de ta pensée"
5. "Sueño"
6. "Liberta feat Djazia"
7. "Petit bonhomme"
8. "Recomposé"
9. "Flying Jack"
10. "Mon monde"
11. "Insonnia"
12. "Lésions dangereuses"
13. "Gaya"
- 2006 : En Attendant
1. "Tristan"
2. "J'te serre"
3. "Boum Boum" (live in Paris)
4. "Paname" (live in Voiron)
5. "Liberta" (Live in Lyon)
6. "La petite récolte du jardinier" (live in Grenoble)
- 2008 : Utopies Dans Le Décor, released on May 12, 2008 - #8 in France, #23 in Belgium (Wallonia)
1. "Mélodie"
2. "Dans ma tête"
3. "Poterie des Dieux"
4. "Liberta"
5. "J'te serre"
6. "Utopie"
7. "Fakir"
8. "Non identifié"
9. "Ça va..."
10. "De l'air"
11. "À l'insouciance"
12. "Me contenter"
13. "…Ça vient"

=== Singles ===
- 2001 : "Follow the Flo"
- 2006 : "En attendant..."
- 2009 : "Liberta" - #1 in France, #2 in Belgium (Wallonia), #40 in Switzerland
- 2017 : "Elma"

== Members ==
- Florian Peppuy : guitar and vocals
- Dan luc Bicrame : scratch, keyboard, percussion and chorus
- Philippe : bass guitar
- Guillaume Marocco : battery

Former member (left the group in 2007)

- Alexandre Combeau : drummer
- Guillaume Diederichs : saxophonist

Current members

- Sébastien Michaut : manager label Tracking Flo
- Mike Inca : manager label Echo productions
- Pierre Niemaz : sound
- Nicolas Longchambon : engineer light
- Oliver Crane : responsible Internet
- Gaël Chatelain : editor (Helice editions)
- Germain Barataud : tourneur (Lamastrock)

== Awards ==
- Springboard to Tullins in 2001
- Price Festival Romans - the establishment of Internet, "music" in 2006
