= Like a Hobo =

Single by Charlie Winston

from the album Hobo
- Released: 2009
- Length: 3:40
- Label: Atmosphériques
- Songwriter(s): Charlie Winston
- Producer(s): Mark Plati

Charlie Winston singles chronology
"Like a Hobo" (2009)	"In Your Hands" (2009)

"Like a Hobo" is a 2009 song recorded by British singer-songwriter Charlie Winston. It was the lead single from his second album Hobo on which it appears as the second track. Released in April 2009, the song achieved great success in Belgium (Wallonia) where it was ranked since January thanks to downloads, and was a top ten hit for 15 weeks. In France, it debuted at number-one on 11 April and stayed for eleven weeks in the top five.

== Track listings ==
CD single – Promo

1. "Like a Hobo" – 3:40

Digital download

1. "Like a Hobo" – 3:40

== Charts ==
Chart (2009)	Peak position
Austrian Singles Chart	8
Belgian (Wallonia) Singles Chart	3
Eurochart Hot 100	9
French SNEP Singles Chart	1
German Singles Chart	11
Swiss Singles Chart	27

End of year chart (2009)	Position
Belgian (Wallonia) Singles Chart	4
Eurochart Hot 100	20
French Singles Chart	10
Swiss Singles Chart	63

End of Year Chart (2010)	Position
Austrian Singles Chart	74
