= Hobo (Charlie Winston album) =

Studio album by Charlie Winston
- Released: 26 January 2009
- Recorded: 2009
- Genre: Folk
- Label: Real World Records / Atmosphériques
- Producers: Charlie Winston, Mark Plati

Charlie Winston chronology
Make Way (2007)	Hobo (2009)	Running Still (2011)

Professional ratings
Review scores
Source	Rating
Allmusic	4/5 stars

Hobo is the second album by British singer-songwriter Charlie Winston. It was released by Real World Records in 2009.

The first single was "Like a Hobo".

== Track listing ==
1. "In Your Hands" (3:51)
2. "Like a Hobo" (3:39)
3. "Kick the Bucket" (2:39)
4. "I Love Your Smile" (4:39)
5. "My Life as a Duck" (3:41)
6. "Boxes" (4:41)
7. "Calling Me" (4:38)
8. "Tongue Tied" (4:41)
9. "Soundtrack to Falling in Love" (4:52)
10. "Generation Spent" (4:18)
11. "Every Step" (3:40)
12. "My Name" (4:28)

== Deluxe edition ==
Disc 1: Hobo

1. "In Your Hands" (3:51)
2. "Like a Hobo" (3:39)
3. "Kick the Bucket" (2:39)
4. "I Love Your Smile" (4:39)
5. "My Life as a Duck" (3:41)
6. "Boxes" (4:41)
7. "Calling Me" (4:38)
8. "Tongue Tied" (4:41)
9. "Soundtrack to Falling in Love" (4:52)
10. "Generation Spent" (4:18)
11. "Every Step" (3:40)
12. "My Name" (4:28)
13. "Kick the Bucket" (Single Version) (3:06)
14. "I’m a Man" (5:55)
15. "I Love Your Smile" (Extended Version) (4:16)
16. "Boxes" (Live in Rome) (3'37)

Disc 2: DVD

1. Documentary 40'
2. "Like a Hobo"
3. "In Your Hands"
4. "Kick the Bucket"

== Charts and sales ==
=== Weekly charts ===
Chart (2009)	Peak position
Austrian Albums (Ö3 Austria)	57
Belgian Albums (Ultratop Wallonia)	3
Canadian Albums Chart	91
French Albums (SNEP)	1
German Albums (Offizielle Top 100)	16
Swiss Albums (Schweizer Hitparade)	9

=== Year-end charts ===
Chart (2009)	Position
Belgian Albums (Ultratop Wallonia)	10
French Albums (SNEP)	3
Swiss Albums (Schweizer Hitparade)	51

Chart (2009)	Position
Belgian Albums (Ultratop Wallonia)	79
French Albums (SNEP)	42

=== Sales ===
Country	Certification	Date	Sales certified
France	3× Platinum	28 December 2009	400,000
