= Tatoue-moi =

Single by Mikelangelo Loconte (Mozart, l'opéra rock)

from the album Mozart, l'opéra rock
- B-side: "Quand le rideau tombe"
- Released: December 15, 2008
- Recorded: 2008
- Genre: Pop
- Length: 3:20
- Label: Wam
- Songwriter(s): Dove Attia, Patrice Guirao; Rodrigue Janois, Jean-Pierre Pilot; William Rousseau, Olivier Schultheis
- Producer(s): Jean-Pierre Pilot; Olivier Schultheis

Mozart, l'opéra rock singles chronology
"Tatoue-moi" (2008)	"Vivre à en crever" (2009)

"Tatoue-moi" is a 2008 French pop song recorded by Italian singer Mikelangelo Loconte. It is the first single from the musical Mozart, l'opéra rock and from the album of the same name, released on April 6, 2009. Olivier Schultheis, Jean Schultheis' son, participated in the composing of the song. The single was released on December 15, 2008 and achieved huge success in France, where it went straight to number-one on the SNEP singles chart on January 17, 2009, selling 8,280 copies and remained atop for five consecutive weeks. It was also number-one on the French digital chart, for a sole week.

== Track listings ==
CD single

1. "Tatoue-moi" — 3:20
2. "Quand le rideau tombe" —3:54
3. "Tatoue-moi" (video)
4. Bonus : Les coulisses du tournage du clip "Tatoue-moi"

Digital download

1. "Tatoue-moi" — 3:20

== Charts ==
Chart (2009)	Peak position
Belgian (Wallonia) Singles Chart	18
Eurochart Hot 100	7
French SNEP Singles Chart	1
French SNEP Digital Chart	1
Swiss Singles Chart	91

End of year chart (2009)	Position
Belgian (Wallonia) Singles Chart	33
Eurochart Hot 100	25
French Singles Chart	3
French Airplay Chart	43
