= Mozart, l'opéra rock =

French musical

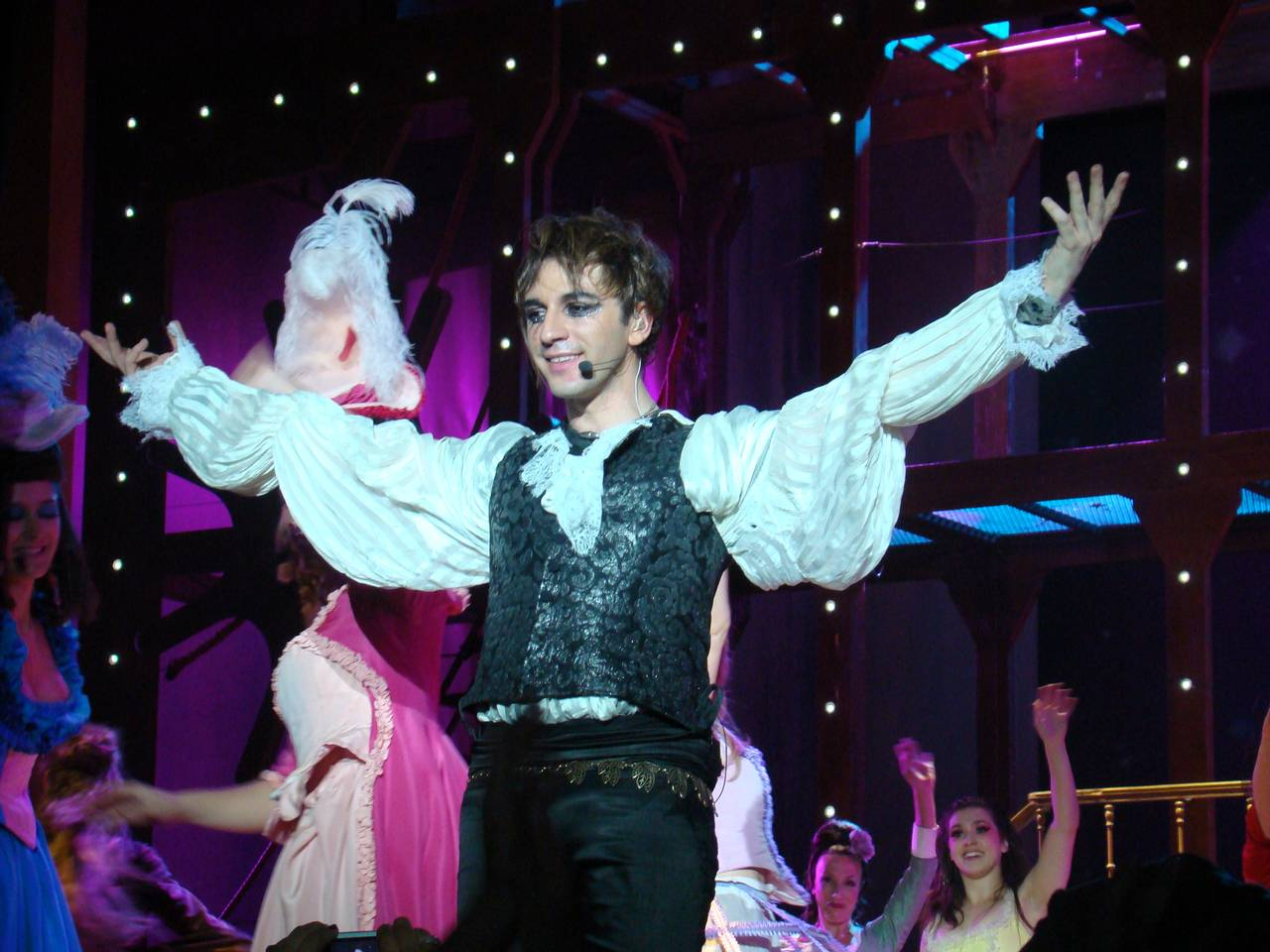
- Mikelangelo Loconte as Mozart
- Music: Dove Attia; François Castello; Rodrigue Janois; Nicolas Luciani; Wolfgang Amadeus Mozart; Jean-Pierre Pilot; William Rousseau; Antonio Salieri; Olivier Schultheis
- Lyrics: Vincent Baguian; Patrice Guirao
- Book: Dove Attia; François Chouquet
- Basis: The life and music of Wolfgang Amadeus Mozart
- Premiere: 22 September 2009: Palais des Sports, Paris
- Productions: 2009 Paris; 2010 Paris; 2010 Belgium; 2010 Switzerland; 2011 Paris; 2013 Japan; 2019 Japan

Mozart, l'opéra rock ("Mozart, the rock opera") is a French musical with music by Dove Attia, Jean-Pierre Pilot, Olivier Schultheis, William Rousseau, Nicolas Luciani, Rodrigue Janois and François Castello, lyrics by Vincent Baguian and Patrice Guirao and a book by Attia and François Chouquet. The show is a dramatization of the life of Wolfgang Amadeus Mozart (portrayed by Mikelangelo Loconte), beginning from the age of 17 and culminating with his death in 1791 at the age of 35. It uses both original pop-rock compositions as well as pre-existing music composed by Mozart and other composers, including Antonio Salieri.

== Productions ==
The musical premiered on 22 September 2009 at the Palais des Sports de Paris, where it continued until 3 January 2010. From 4 February 2010 until 3 July 2010, it went on tour in France, Belgium, and Switzerland. It returned to Paris between 9 November 2010 and 9 January 2011. A second tour began on 4 February 2011, and the production closed on 10 July 2011 at the Palais Omnisports de Paris-Bercy. It was directed by Olivier Dahan, choreographed by Dan Stewart and produced by Attia and Albert Cohen.

In 2013, Japanese production featured Akinori Nakagawa and Koji Yamamoto alternating the roles of Mozart and Salieri.

In 2019, Japan's all-female theater troupe Takarazuka Revue Star Troupe's staged the musical. It featured Makoto Rei as Mozart, Hitomi Maisora as Constanze and Ruumi Nagina as Salieri. Production ran in both Osaka and Tokyo, and released a CD and Blu-ray.

== Synopsis ==
=== Act I ===
The show opens with the accession of Hieronymus von Colloredo-Mannsfeld to the archbishop of Salzburg. Unlike the previous ruler, Colloredo is discouraging of the arts, which does not bode well for the Mozart family, who work for him. When Leopold Mozart requests leave to tour with his seventeen-year-old son and musical prodigy, Wolfgang, Colloredo refuses and suggests Leopold and Wolfgang quit if they are dissatisfied. Leopold and his daughter, Wolfgang's older sister, Nannerl, bemoan the state of Salzburg and its subservient people (Penser l'Impossible). Wolfgang appears, tumbling out from under the skirts of several women he's been chasing, and proceeds to be told exactly what Colloredo told Leopold: His leave has been denied.

Wolfgang insists that he'll leave Salzburg alone if he has to, as Leopold must stay behind because they cannot afford to be without work. Instead, Leopold sends Wolfgang's mother, Anna Maria, with him, as well as a warning: to find work fast, because a musician without a patron is no one. Anna Maria and Wolfgang set out for Mannheim, unaware that Colloredo has already sent word ahead to the Prince to assure that Wolfgang will not find work with him.

The show moves ahead to an inn in Mannheim (La chanson de l'aubergiste), where Wolfgang enters with several finished commissions. After sharing his dream of writing a grand opera in German, he is ridiculed by several of the people in the bar who remind him that all operas are written in Italian. Wolfgang rejects their comments (Le Trublion) and a fight breaks out, during which both he and his mother flee before being arrested by the police. A local copyist meets them, already aware of Wolfgang's musical prestige, and offers to copy all of his compositions free and help him distribute them for a small condition – coming to visit his family.

The copyist is Fridolin Weber – Cecilia's husband – and they intend to have Wolfgang help them prepare their daughter, Aloysia, for a ball for the Princess of Orange to boost her fame. Anna Maria and Wolfgang visit the Webers at their home, where Wolfgang is introduced to Sophie, Josepha, and Constanze. Upon the appearance of Aloysia (Bim Bam Boum), Wolfgang falls head over heels and forgoes his other commissions to help her prepare for her showcase to the Princess. He and the other members of the Weber family are unaware that Constanze has already started to fall in love with the young composer (Ah! Vous dirais-je maman).

Anna Maria, seeing that her son is prepared to throw away his musical career over his love of Aloysia, writes home to Leopold in the hopes that he will be able to snap Wolfgang out of his enamored state. She attempts to do this by telling Wolfgang that his commissions have been dropped and he's been rejected for employment, but Wolfgang insists that Aloysia is his future and displays no worry.

At the ball, Wolfgang and Aloysia display their respective musical talents, while Fridolin and Cecila attempt to get the Princess of Orange to take an interest in their daughter. While Wolfgang discusses music with the Princess, Aloysia discovers Constanze's jealousy over her relationship with Wolfgang (Six pieds sous terre). Wolfgang returns to announce that Aloysia will, indeed, be employed with the Princess of Orange and seems prepared to dedicate his life to her when Anna Maria arrives with a letter from Leopold (J'accuse mon père). He instructs Wolfgang to go to Paris to find work, and only then may he return to Aloysia. Aloysia, who intended to work with Wolfgang to bolster her success, proclaims that she hates him in response to Wolfgang's confession of love (something that Wolfgang does not hear).

After arriving in Paris, Wolfgang attempts to distribute his music and find a job (Tatoue-moi), but finds that Paris's doors have closed to him as well. When his mother suddenly falls ill and passes away (la Procession), he is left alone and jobless. In this state he imagines a grand and mocking display (la Mascarade) before Aloysia appears again. Still in love with her, he tells her that he has written an aria for her, which she ignores. She tells him that she is involved in the opera now, and far too busy for him. With lingering hatred she mocks his mourning clothes, seeming unaffected by the death of his mother, and when Wolfgang confesses that he wants to marry her she tells him that she is engaged to the actor Joseph Lange.

Realizing how alone he is, and that all doors have closed to him, Wolfgang reflects on the humiliation, betrayal, and suffering he has gone through (Je dors sur des roses). Seeming defeated by his losses and hopelessness, Wolfgang rejects everyone who has attempted to bring him down and decides he will believe in his old dreams and aspirations, regardless of who or what stands in his way.

=== Act II ===
Wolfgang has returned to Salzburg under the service of Colloredo and is preparing to leave for Vienna with the archbishop to pay homage to the newly crowned Joseph II. He tells his father that he plans to make a new life for himself in Vienna, which his father scoffs at, reminding him that his previous carelessness resulted in the death of his mother. He instructs Wolfgang to do as the archbishop tells him and return to Salzburg when he's done, but Wolfgang insists that he'll do what he has to as it's his life, and his music.

After leaving the company of his father, he is confronted by Colloredo, who reiterates his father's message of doing as he's told. When Wolfgang attempts to reason with him, Colloredo will hear nothing of it and tells him to go join the other servants – who proceed to mock him alongside a clown-like representation of his own doubt (Comédie-tragédie). The badgering mounts to a crescendo and he informs Colloredo that he quits and he is free to do as he pleases from now on. He proceeds to pass out his music throughout all of Vienna, where it is well received, and he finally begins to make a name for himself (Place je passe).

The scene moves to Antonio Salieri, walking with Rosenberg, the Steward to Emperor Joseph II, and Gottlieb Stephanie, a librettist who has recently finished his piece The Abduction from the Seraglio. Rosenberg tells Salieri of the newcomer, Wolfgang, and his aspirations of composing a German opera, which Rosenberg then proceeds to mock for its lack of eloquence. Upon the appearance of the Emperor, Rosenberg attempts to discourage him from choosing Wolfgang as the composer for his commission on the basis of his desire to use German instead of the more traditional Italian.

Rosenberg explains that Wolfgang insists on writing in nothing other than German, though the idea of an opera in Vienna's native language appeals to the Emperor. He asks for the opinion of Salieri, already a well-known composer of the court, who appears to agree with the idea that Wolfgang is foolish, but also concedes that he is infinitely talented. In the end, Joseph decides that Mozart will do the music for their opera, much to the glee of Stephanie and the disdain of Rosenberg.

At the height of his dispute with Colloredo, Wolfgang takes up board with the Webers, who have moved to Vienna after the death of Fridolin and are taking in boarders to make ends meet. It is here he is re-introduced to Constanze, who has apparently decided to give up on love as she puts far too much into her relationships and is left heartbroken when they do not work out (Si je défaille). While Josepha and Sophie are excited to see him again, Cecilia is less than pleased with how he left Aloysia. Though she happily tells him that Aloysia's now married, doing well, and expecting a child. She also tells him that she doesn't want Wolfgang getting any ideas about her other daughters (or her, for that matter). After she leaves, Josepha and Sophie bombard him with questions about his newfound success in Vienna until Constanze intervenes and leads him to his room to get some rest.

Moving ahead, it has come time for Salieri and Rosenberg to check on the progress Wolfgang has made with his opera. When they arrive, Monsieur Stephanie attempts to dissuade them, but they press on anyway and discover that Wolfgang is distracted from his work, instead chasing Constanze and demanding a kiss. Rosenberg is appalled by the display while Monsieur Stephanie attempts to get Wolfgang's attention. Wolfgang ignores him, and the diva, La Cavalieri, goes so far so to tease the latter with a kiss when she attempts to get him to focus.

It is ultimately Salieri who gets his attention with a simple recitation of his name. He explains that they are there on behalf of the Emperor and, by what they've seen, he will be disappointed. Annoyed at the treatment, Wolfgang demands to know how they can judge without hearing a single note, to which Rosenberg replies that there are too many notes. After a brief argument, Rosenberg tells Salieri that they're leaving and exits. Salieri, believing Wolfgang's behavior was a display to prevent them from discovering how little he's achieved, commends him for the clever plot. He remarks that he hopes Wolfgang's apparent confidence is not a front for a lack of real talent.

However, before he can go, Wolfgang passes him his sheet music, saying that he would not need it as he begins to conduct. Salieri stays behind to listen and is overcome by the beauty of Wolfgang's work and the skill he displays (Le bien qui fait mal). Startled and unnerved by the immeasurable talent, Salieri tells Wolfgang that if he remembers his place, all will be well between them. Salieri leaves and, pleased with his victory, Wolfgang returns to his game with Constanze. Unfortunately for the young lovers, Cecilia catches them and explains that she has had an agreement written up (a "promesse de mariage," in French, or "promise of marriage"): If Wolfgang does not marry Constanze within three years, he will have to pay Cecilia 300 florins. With no way out, Wolfgang signs the agreement despite knowing his father will not approve, and Constanze, upset with her mother's trap, runs off.

Back in Salzburg, Nannerl reads the news to her father that Wolfgang is doing well in Vienna and has a promising career of fame and fortune ahead of him. Leopold, however, is distraught over his son's request to marry Constanze. Despite Nannerl's suggestion of letting them be happy and her insistence that Constanze seems sincere, Leopold is unmoved. She relates to Constanze, understanding her love for Wolfgang, and in Vienna, Constanze reiterates this fact. Wolfgang, unable to believe that Constanze had anything to do with Cecilia's trap for him, confronts Constanze about it. Constanze insists that she didn't know about it and that she loves him of her own accord, so when Wolfgang tells her that it is not enough, she rips up the stolen contract. Now confident in their love, Wolfgang asks her to marry him, and the two are wed (Les solos sous les draps).

After the ceremony, Rosenberg explains his growing disdain for not only Wolfgang's work, but also for Salieri's nonchalant treatment of it. He mocks Salieri's calm demeanor, as well as his disregard for how successful Wolfgang seems to be in Vienna, unaware that he is being watched by the very person he's ridiculing. Despite his disapproval, he admits to a few decent parts, beginning to sing the overture as one of them. After a short dance, Salieri makes himself known, startling Rosenberg greatly in the process, and proceeds to mimic Rosenberg's previous exaggerated display of his behavior. When asked if he really enjoys Wolfgang's music that much, Rosenberg denies it and explains that he was actually cursing in rage. He also tells Salieri that he plans to have friends of his sit in front of the Emperor at the opera's premiere to boo and hiss it. Salieri hesitates, but ultimately tells him to go ahead with the plan.

After the success of The Abduction from the Seraglio, Wolfgang enjoys a celebration with his friends and wife, where they mock Salieri and Rosenberg's attempts at upsetting the show. It is here that Wolfgang is approached by the well-known librettist, Lorenzo Da Ponte, who expresses interest in working with him. He presents Wolfgang with the work he had in mind, but Wolfgang refuses, instead proposing The Marriage of Figaro, a controversial drama by Beaumarchais. Da Ponte initially refuses, wary of the trouble it could cause, but is swayed when Wolfgang explains that he associates not with radical politics, but the triumph of Figaro as a free man. Da Ponte agrees, and they begin work.

At the rehearsal several months later, Joseph is frustrated to find that his opera has no music, and Wolfgang explains that Rosenberg has crippled his finale by declaring that the use of ballet has been forbidden by the Emperor. Joseph replies that he will simply change the old custom. He instructs Salieri to fix the problem, and Salieri tells Wolfgang to recommence the rehearsal with musical accompaniment.

Frustrated by Salieri's compliance, Rosenberg confronts him and rebuffs the idea that Salieri was getting them out of the mess Rosenberg nearly got them in. Still feeling that Salieri doesn't understand, he is surprised to find that Salieri actually understands very well: The monarchy will never approve of The Marriage of Figaro, and it will be Wolfgang's undoing. He instructs Rosenberg to spread rumors and discord throughout the salons and cast, to bribe them if need be, before sending him off.

However, as Rosenberg exits, Salieri is conflicted about his actions, acknowledging again that Wolfgang's music is sublime. He laments his inability to compare with Wolfgang's talent despite dedicating himself to his music day and night, and, driven nearly to madness with jealousy and impending guilt, Salieri attempts to commit suicide (l'Assasymphonie). He fails to do so, however, and ultimately lives to see the fruition of his plans.

As friends of Wolfgang, including Constanze and Aloysia, are celebrating the success of The Marriage of Figaro, Rosenberg appears to tell them that, at the order of the Emperor, the opera has been banned in Vienna. This begins a downward spiral for Wolfgang, starting with his distraction while he and Da Ponte attempt to recover from the failure of Figaro with a new opera, Don Giovanni, due to his father being ill. Unable to leave due to his work, Wolfgang is unable to be in Salzburg with Nannerl when Leopold passes away (Dors mon ange).

Later, a mysterious, masked figure appears when Wolfgang is in dire need of money, commissioning him on behalf of an unnamed connoisseur. The commission is for a requiem mass, and Wolfgang is paid 100 ducats upfront with a promise of more when he finishes. The mysterious figure leaves, telling him to work with the greatest possible care. While Constanze believes this will solve their financial problems, Wolfgang worries about something far more serious: he believes the man has come from the afterlife to signal the end.

In another part of Vienna, a party has gathered to celebrate Salieri obtaining the title of choirmaster of the Imperial Chapel, as well to as mock Wolfgang's latest opera , The Magic Flute. The only one to stand up for Wolfgang is Da Ponte, who quickly leaves in disgust at their display. Although he has achieved everything he wanted, Salieri is bitter about the victory over Wolfgang and spiteful towards himself, knowing it was obtained through underhanded means (Victime de ma victoire). He realizes that despite winning, he has still lost.

Wolfgang, impoverished and ill, attempts to keep working even as his adversaries continue to openly berate and insult him. While working with his student, Süssmayr, to complete his requiem, Wolfgang collapses and is ushered to bed by both Süssmayr and Constanze. His condition continues to worsen, and he struggles to get out of bed when Salieri visits, having heard of Wolfgang's illness and now wishing to reconcile what he'd done. Though Constanze tries to get him to leave, Wolfgang insists on getting from his sickbed to speak with him.

He confides in Salieri that he will not finish his requiem, and he knows that he is dying. When Constanze becomes upset and tries to call a doctor, he tells her that he only wishes to see Süssmayr and that everything needed for finishing the requiem is on the desk. Constanze leaves in tears, and Wolfgang realizes how quickly life passes, just as Salieri realizes that the fear and anguish he felt are unimportant, as was the fleeting desire to outdo Wolfgang. They agree to meet each other again, in a place where their rivalry and offenses mean nothing anymore (Vivre à en crever). The musical ends with Wolfgang's death and ascension.

== Musical numbers ==
=== Act I ===
- Ouverture (Orchestra)
- Penser l'impossible (Leopold and Nannerl)
- La chanson de l'aubergiste (The Innkeeper)
- Le Trublion (Wolfgang Amadeus Mozart)
- Bim bam boum (Aloysia)
- Ah! Vous dirais-je maman (Constanze)
- Six pieds sous terre (Constanze and Aloysia)
- J'accuse mon père (Leopold)
- Tatoue-moi (Wolfgang Amadeus Mozart)
- La procession (Orchestra)
- La mascarade (Orchestra)
- Je dors sur des roses (Wolfgang Amadeus Mozart)

=== Act II ===
- Comédie-tragédie (The Clown)
- Place je passe (Wolfgang Amadeus Mozart)
- Si je défaille (Constanze)
- Le bien qui fait mal (Antonio Salieri)
- Les solos sous les draps (Constanze, Nannerl and Leopold)
- L'assasymphonie (Antonio Salieri)
- Vive les noces de Figaro (Constanze and Aloysia)
- Dors mon ange (Nannerl)
- Victime de ma victoire (Antonio Salieri)
- Vivre à en crever (Wolfgang Amadeus Mozart and Antonio Salieri)
- C'est bientôt la fin (Company)

=== Songs not included in the musical ===
- Debout les fous (Company)
- Je danse avec les dieux (Wolfgang Amadeus Mozart)
- Quand le rideau tombe (Leopold)
- Bonheur de malheur (Constanze and Aloysia)
- Le carnivore (Wolfgang Amadeus Mozart)
- L'opérap (Company)

== Original cast ==
- Mikelangelo Loconte: Wolfgang Amadeus Mozart
- Diane Dassigny, preceded by Claire Pérot: Constanze, wife of Mozart
- Melissa Mars: Aloysia Weber, Mozart's first love; sister to Constanze
- Florent Mothe: Antonio Salieri, Mozart's rival at Vienna
- Maeva Méline: Nannerl, sister to Mozart
- Solal: Leopold, father of Mozart
- Yamin Dib: Count Rosenberg, intendant to Joseph II
- Merwan Rim: Innkeeper and Clown
- Ariane Pirie preceded by Delphine Grandsart: Cäcilia Weber, mother of Aloysia and Constance
- Jocelyne Sand: Anna Maria Mozart, mother of Mozart
- Mathias Jung: Colloredo, Prince-archbishop of Salzburg, Tutor of Constanze, and the Stranger
- Patrice Maktav: Lorenzo da Ponte
- Jean-Michel Meunier: Fridolin, father of Aloysia and Constanze, and Joseph II
- Marjolaine Piémont: Josepha Weber, sister to Aloysia and Constanze
- Estelle Micheau: The diva (La Cavalieri)
- Laurie Peret: Sophie Weber, sister to Aloysia and Constanze
- Nuno Resende: Gottlieb Stephanie

== Discography ==
The first CD single featured the songs "Tatoue-moi" and "Quand le rideau tombe", and was released in 2008. This single was number one in sales for five weeks, and remained in the top 5 for eleven weeks. Other singles followed in 2009: Vivre à en crever, L'assasymphonie and Le bien qui fait mal. Two more singles were released in 2010: J'accuse mon père and C'est bientôt la fin.

The first cast album consisted of 12 tracks and was released in April 2009. The complete recording, comprising 27 tracks, was released in September 2009.

Six music videos were made to accompany the show: Tatoue-Moi, Vivre à En Crever, L'Assasymphonie, Le Bien Qui Fait Mal, J'accuse mon père and C'est bientôt la fin.

The 2013 Japan production released two CDs, featuring the two casts in which Akinori Nakagawa and Koji Yamamoto alternated the roles of Mozart and Salieri.

== Film ==
In November 2010, a DVD recording of the show was released. The show was also recorded in 3D and released theatrically in 2011.

Takarazuka Revue released a Blu-ray of the Star Troupe's 2019 production.

== Critical reception ==
The show has received mixed responses from critics, despite a large fan following and great popularity within Europe.

Le Figaro praised the lighting and certain "innovations" in the staging, but also noted "the mediocre sound, an inconsistent libretto and uneven casting," stating that Mikelangelo Loconte's performance at Mozart was at once over-the top and "disembodied." Le Point also praised the lighting but deplored the "insipid melodies" and a "mediocrity" which the actors were unable to overcome. France Soir described the show as "lacking genius and impertinence," weighed down by "a disjointed first act," "simpering" female characters and a "fidgety" Mozart. 'L'Express noted the "stylized scenes" and "hurried narrative." The magazine Têtu referred to the musical as "glittering, sugared like a meringue," extremely amusing but lacking noteworthy vocal skill.

On the other hand, the magazine Première stated that the show was a success. Thierry Quinson of regardencoulisse.com, despite qualifications regarding the sound and the weak narrative of the second act, asserted that the project marked "a veritable evolution in the grand musicals of the last few years: the songs are better written, less formulaic and syrupy, a better-constructed narrative leaving more room for acting and choreography which is less invasive and systematic."

== Awards and nominations ==
NRJ Music Awards 2010 :

- Group / duo / French cast of the year
- French discovery of the year for Florent Mothe
- French song of the year for L'assasymphonie
