= Yves Pouliquen =

French ophthalmologist (1931–2020)

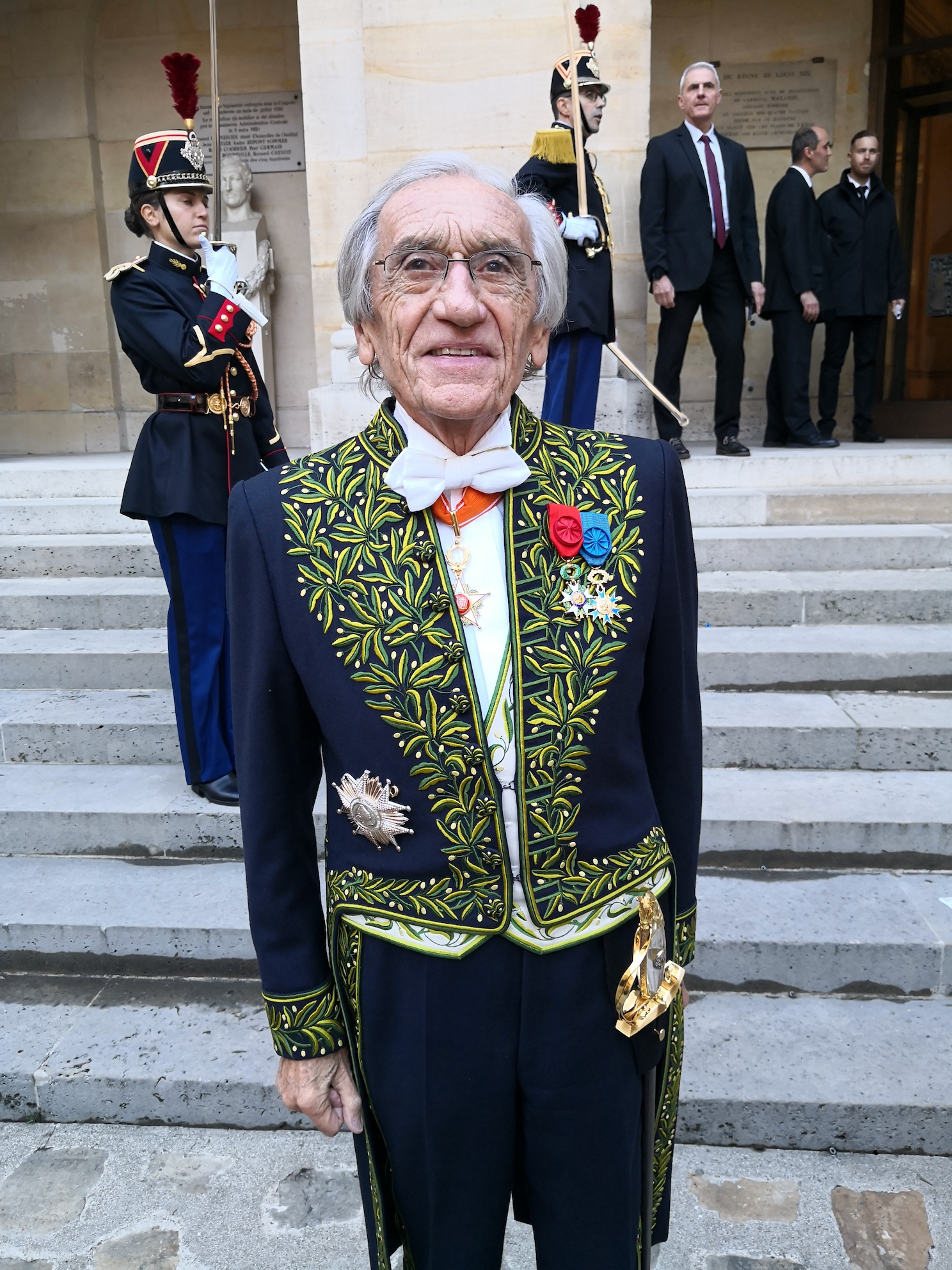
- Yves Pouliquen in 2019
- Born: 17 February 1931; Mortain, France
- Died: 5 February 2020 (aged 88); Paris, France
- Education: University of Paris
- Occupation: Ophthalmologist
- Known for: Member of the Académie Française

Yves Pouliquen (17 February 1931 – 5 February 2020) was a French ophthalmologist. His work focused on the pathology of the cornea.

Pouliquen was born in Mortain. In 1992, he was made a member of the Académie nationale de médecine. In 1994 he was awarded the Prix mondial Cino Del Duca and on 29 November 2001 he was elected to the Académie Française. Since 2006, he was the president of the Fondation Singer-Polignac.

In 2000, Pouliquen was featured in the documentary film Vies. He was a member of the International Review Board of the Japanese Journal of Ophthalmology.

== Bibliography ==
- 1967 La Transparence de la cornée (Masson)
- 1969 Atlas d'histologie et d'ultrastructure de l'œil (Masson)
- 1973 Les Homogreffes de la cornée (Masson)
- 1974 Les Lentilles souples (Masson)
- 1983 L'Herpès de la cornée, précis d'ophtalmologie (Masson)
- 1990 La Cataracte (Hermann)
- 1992 La Transparence de l'œil (Odile Jacob)
- 1995 Les Yeux de l'autre (Odile Jacob)
- 1999 Un oculiste au temps des lumières (Odile Jacob)
- 2003 Le Geste et l'esprit (Odile Jacob)
- 2006 Mme de Sévigné et la médecine du grand siècle (Odile Jacob)
- 2008 Le Médecin et le Dictateur (Odile Jacob)
