= Helmut Fritz =

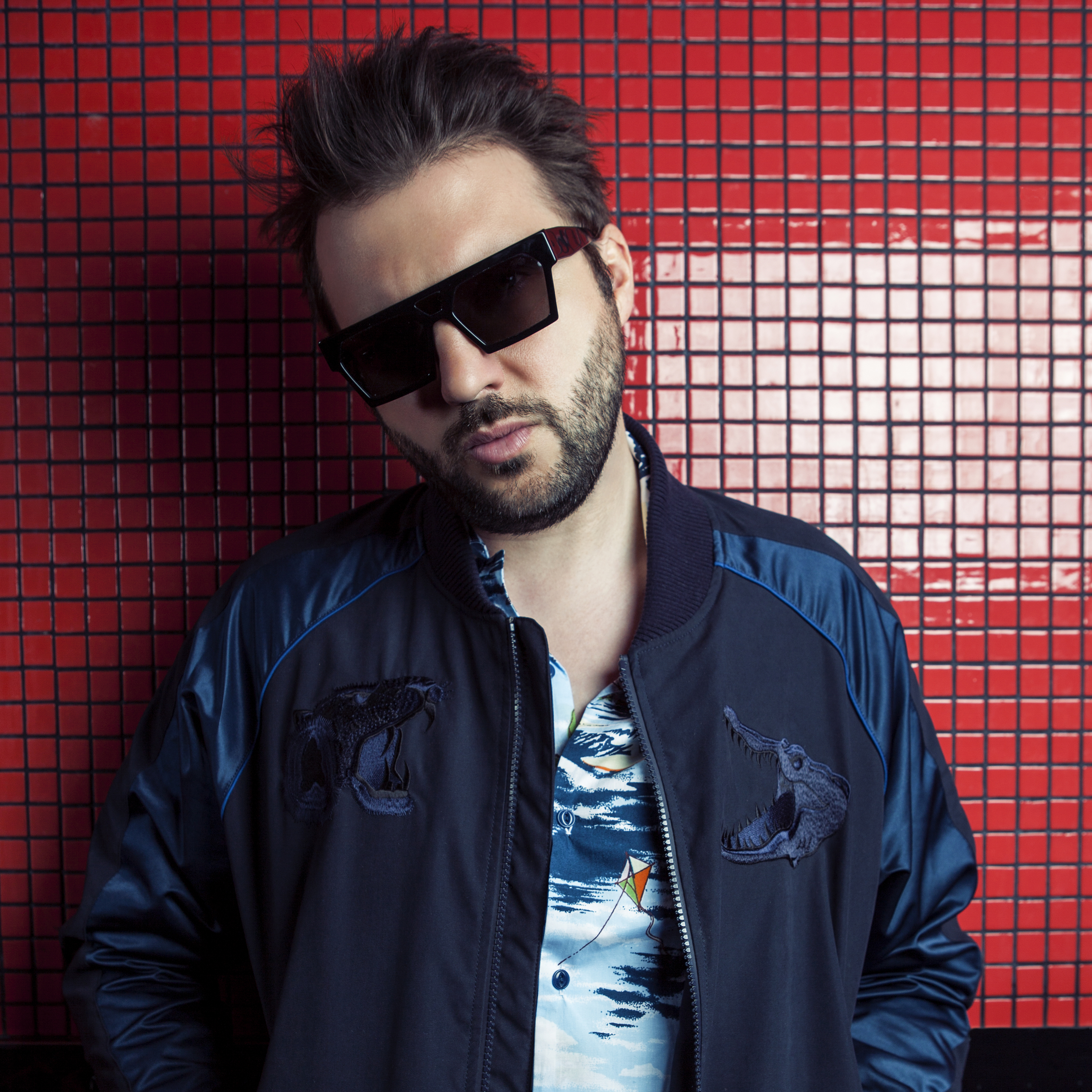

Background information
- Also known as: Helmut Günter von Fritz, Géronimo
- Born: Éric Greff; July 19, 1975 (age 51)
- Origin: Moselle, France
- Genres: Electronic
- Occupation: Singer
- Years active: 2008–present
- Label: Sony Music Entertainment

Éric Greff (French pronunciation: [eʁik ɡʁɛf]; born 19 July 1975 in Forbach, Moselle), better known by his aliases Helmut Fritz and Géronimo, is a French singer-songwriter and record producer. Greff is known for his 2009 single "Ça m'énerve", in which he portrays a German dandy living in Paris. The single, produced by Laurent Konrad, was released in March 2009 and rapidly reached number one in France.

== Discography ==
=== Albums ===
His first album En Observation was released on 22 June 2009, available digitally since 15 June.

- En Observation – #32 in France, #63 in Belgium (Wallonia), #92 in Switzerland

=== Singles ===
- "Ça m'énerve" – #1 in France, #21 in Belgium (Flanders), #3 in Belgium (Wallonia), #8 in Switzerland
- "Miss France" – #7 in France, #15 in Belgium (Wallonia), #55 in Switzerland
- "Ça Gère" – #14 in France
