= Ça m'énerve =

Single by Helmut Fritz

from the album En observation
- B-side: "Remix"
- Released: 16 March 2009
- Recorded: 2009
- Genre: Electro house
- Length: 3:38
- Label: Dust
- Songwriter(s): Éric Greff, Laurent Konrad; Mohammad Sadeghin
- Producer(s): Laurent Konrad

Helmut Fritz singles chronology
"Ça m'énerve" (2009)	"Miss France" (2009)

"Ça m'énerve" (pronounced [sa menɛʁv], lit. 'It Bugs Me') is a 2009 electronic novelty song recorded by French singer Helmut Fritz. It was his debut single from his album En observation and was released on 16 March 2009. It was a huge hit in France, where it topped the singles chart. The song was produced by Laurent Konrad, who had previously worked with Discobitch. The radio edit version and the vip dub mix are included on the track listing of the album.

== Lyrics meaning ==
The song narrates the story of the fictional character Helmut Fritz, a rich German-born dandy who has moved to live in Paris. He tries to become a socialite, but with funny results; therefore the high society, its attitude and habits all end up getting on his nerves (hence the title).

== Chart performance ==
The single was a hit on the French Digital Chart, staying for 10 consecutive weeks at number one. On 21 March 2009, it went to number seven on the SNEP singles chart and reached number-one in its 13th week. It was number-two for ten weeks, becoming the major hit of 2009 in France. As of August 2014, it was the 75th best-selling single of the 21st century in France, with 342,000 units sold.

In Wallonia (Belgium), the single debuted at number 29 on 18 April and reached a peak of number three for four weeks. It peaked at number eight on 24 May in Switzerland and achieved a moderate success in Flanders (Belgium) where it was ranked for seven weeks.

== Cover versions ==
German female singer Ursula Bretzel parodied the song under the title "Ça m'excite". In 2010, Les Enfoirés recorded a cover of the song for their album La Crise de nerfs! ; the singers on this version are Patrick Fiori, Pascal Obispo, Jean-Louis Aubert, Christophe Maé, Kad Merad and Gérard Jugnot for the verses.

In 2020, it was covered by Helmut Fritz himself, singing about the 2020 confinement due to the COVID-19 pandemic.

== Track listings ==
CD single

No.	Title	Length
1.	"Ça m'énerve" (radio edit)	3:38
2.	"Ça m'énerve" (extended mix)	5:54
3.	"Ça m'énerve" (vip dub mix)	5:17
4.	"Biography video" (bonus)	4:30
5.	"Ça m'énerve" (music video)	3:46

Digital download

No.	Title	Length
1.	"Ça m'énerve" (radio edit)	3:38
2.	"Ça m'énerve" (extended mix)	5:54
3.	"Ça m'énerve" (vip dub mix)	5:17
4.	"Ça m'énerve" (music video)	3:46

== Charts ==
=== Weekly charts ===
Chart (2009/10)	Peak position
Belgian Singles Chart (Flanders)	21
Belgian Singles Chart (Wallonia)	3
Canadian Hot 100	66
European Hot 100 Singles	3
French Digital Singles Chart	1
French Physical Singles Chart	1
Swiss Singles Chart	8

=== Year-end charts ===
Year-end chart (2009)	Position
Belgian Singles Chart (Flanders)	97
Belgian Singles Chart (Wallonia)	7
European Hot 100 Singles	10
French Digital Singles Chart	1
French Physical Singles Chart	1
Swiss Singles Chart	42
Year-end chart (2010)	Position
Belgian (Wallonia) Singles Chart	84

== Certifications ==
Country	Certification	Date	Sales certified
France	Platinum	22 October 2009	500,000+
