= Lady Melody (song) =

Single by Tom Frager and Gwayav'

from the album Better Days
- Released: 2009
- Recorded: 2009
- Genre: Pop
- Length: 3:13
- Label: AZ
- Songwriter: Tom Frager
- Producers: Tom Frager, Henry Daurel

Tom Frager and Gwayav' singles chronology
| "Lady Melody" (2009) | "Give Me That Love" (2009) |

"Lady Melody" is a 2009 song recorded by French singer-songwriter Tom Frager with his group Gwayav'. It is his debut single from his 2008 album Better Days. The promotional CD was sent to the radio in the first days of August and was much aired on radio, becoming a summer hit, then was released physically in early September 2009.

The song achieved success in France where it reached number-one, both on the singles and digital charts, respectively for four and two weeks. On the physical chart, it remained for 17 weeks in the top ten and 34 weeks in the top 100. However, the song was a relative failure in Belgium and Switzerland.

According to Frager, the song was aired on radio before he found a label for the album. He thought the song would be popular, but he did not expect such success. The song, composed in his room, deals with music and is simple and is for everybody. Although the title is in English, lyrics are in French.

== Charts ==
=== Peak positions ===
| Chart (2009) | Peak position |
|---|---|
| Belgian (Wallonia) Singles Chart | 40 |
| Eurochart Hot 100 | 7 |
| French SNEP Singles Chart | 1 |
| French Digital Chart | 1 |
| Swiss Singles Chart | 36 |

=== Year-end charts ===
| End of year chart (2009) | Position |
|---|---|
| Eurochart Hot 100 | 31 |
| French Singles Chart | 8 |
| French Airplay Chart | 31 |
| Year-end Chart (2010) | Position |
| European Hot 100 | 77 |
