= Tom Frager =

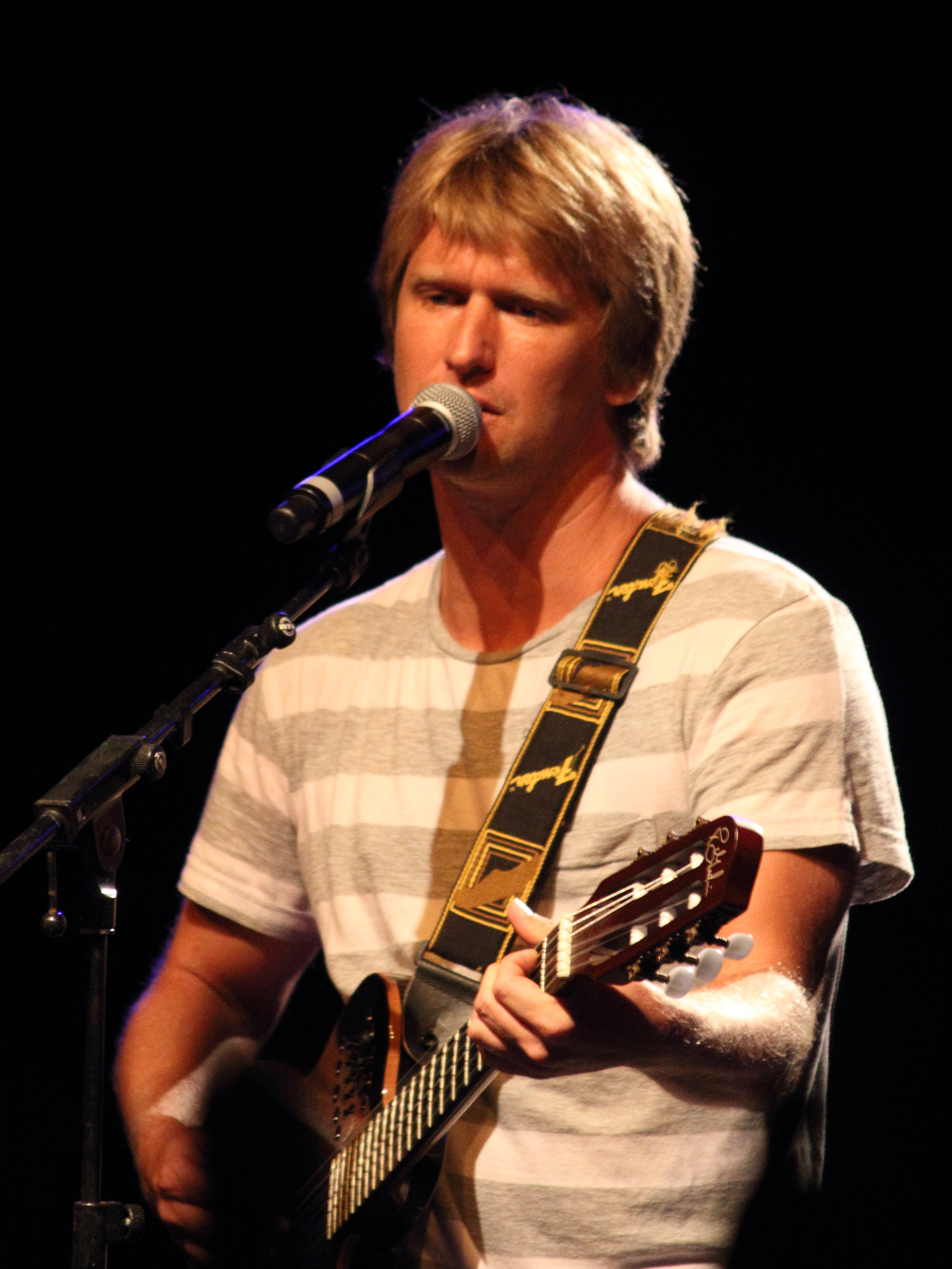
- Tom Frager (7 August 2012, Festival in Vaux-sur-Mer)

Background information
- Born: 1 July 1977 (age 49)
- Origin: Dakar, Senegal
- Genres: Pop, Blues
- Occupation: Singer-songwriter
- Instrument: Guitar
- Years active: 2002–present
- Website: www.myspace.com/tomfrager

Tom Frager (born 1 July 1977 in Dakar, Senegal) is a French songwriter and performer in the group Gwayav' and is also a ten-time surfing champion in Guadeloupe. He is primarily known for his French hit "Lady Melody", number one on the French charts for four weeks.

== Biography ==
Born in Senegal, Tom Frager grew up in Guadeloupe where he became the most successful local surfer of his generation. He moved to metropolitan France in 2000 and lived in Bordeaux. He joined the team of France and, with his guitar, wrote songs during his travels around the world for competitions.

Tom Frager mixed pop, rock, reggae, ska and jazz with original melodies and broken rhythm. His influences range from reggae by Bob Marley to rock by Sublime and pop soul by Jason Mraz.

Frager co-wrote with artists, like Tom Curren and Keziah Jones' guitarist Amen Viana. He was on stage alongside Alpha Blondy, Toots & the Maytals, Patrice, Groundation, Sizzla, Sublime Tribute, the People of the Grass and performed on major festivals such as French Francofolies of La Rochelle or the Extravagance of Biarritz. Tom Frager & Gwayav' gave almost 400 concerts in a period of seven years.

Frager achieved national notability in September 2009 with his song "Lady Melody", which entered the French singles chart at number one and stayed there for four weeks. The song was also number-one on the French digital chart. After the success of this first single from the album Better Days, a new single, "Give Me That Love", was released. The album had a peak at number five in August 2009.

== Gwayav' ==
In 2002, he formed the group Gwayav' with four of his friends, musicians and surfers. Their debut album Bloom Inside sold nearly 5,000 copies.

Members

- Tom Frager: vocals, guitar
- Henry Daurel: guitar
- Janine Terhoff: chorus
- Carolina Carmona: chorus
- Stephane Garcia Tudela: drum kit
- Jerome Gron: piano
- Lionel Dubourdieu: bass
- Marc Closier: saxophone
- Thomas Renwick: guitar
- Fabrice Lefèvre: sound engineer

== Discography ==
=== Albums ===
Tom Frager and Gwayav'

Year	Album	Peak chart positions			
Year	Album	FR	FR (DD)^{1}	BEL (WA)	SWI
2006	Bloom Inside	-	-	-	-
2009	Better Days	5	19	-	-
2013	Carnet de route	82	-	-	-

=== Singles ===
Tom Frager and Gwayav'

Year	Single	Peak chart positions				Album
Year	Single	FR	FR (DD)^{1}	BEL (WA)	SWI	Album
2009	"Lady Melody" (Tom Frager & Gwayav')	1	1	40	36	Better Days
2010	"Give Me That Love" (Tom Frager & Gwayav')	13	37	—	—	Better Days
2010	"Home"	14	—	—	—	Better Days

^{1} Digital Downloads
