= Jena Lee =

- Born: Sylvia Elva Garcia; 29 June 1987 (age 39)
- Genres: Pop
- Occupations: Singer-songwriter
- Years active: 2007–present
- Label: Mercury Records France
- Website: Jena-lee.fr

Sylvia Elva Garcia (born 29 June 1987 in Chile), more commonly known under the stage name as Jena Lee, is a French pop singer and songwriter. She describes her music style as "émo R&B".

== Biography ==
Born in Chile, Sylvia Elva Garcia was adopted by a French family at the age of nine months. She grew up in Oloron-Sainte-Marie, Pyrénées-Atlantiques.

== Music career ==
=== 2007–2009: Popstars and Urban Music Nation ===
In 2007, Lee met Sulee B Wax, who was interested in her work. When the fourth season of Popstars started, he asked Jena to try writing the instrumentals. Lee wrote six songs of the thirteen on Sheryfa Luna's album, including the song "Quelque part". Following this, she received other requests, such as from Mathieu Edward with the title "Comme avant" as well as for a composition for the musical theater show Cléopâtre.

In 2008, Lee won the Urban Music Nation contest organized by radio operator Skyrock; the finale was on 26 December 2008.

=== 2009-2010: First releases ===
Her first single, "J'aimerais tellement" ("I Would Really Love"), was released in April 2009 along with a music video. It was at the top of the French singles charts for a total of eleven weeks and had most downloads in November 2009.

Lee's first album, Vous remercier ("To Thank You"), was recorded with Bustafunk . It was released on 2 November 2009 on the Internet and to stores on 9 November 2009 on the label Mercury Records, a division of the group Universal Music France.

In 2010, Lee released Ma référence, which contains the singles "US Boy", "Éternise-moi", the duet with French group Eskemo, and "Mon ange" ("My angel").

== Discography ==
=== Albums ===
Year	Album	Peak chart positions			
Year	Album	FR	FR (DD)^{1}	BEL (WA)	SWI
2009	Vous remercier	6	6	53	98
2010	Ma référence	11	8	72	—

=== Singles ===
Year	Single	Peak chart positions			
Year	Single	FR	FR (DD)^{1}	BEL (WA)	SWI
2009	"J'aimerais tellement"	1	1	25	50
2009	"Je me perds"	4	12	-	-
2010	"Du style"	10	46	-	-
2010	"Éternise-moi" feat. Eskemo	-	-	-	-
2010	"U.S. Boy"	93	18	-	-
2015	"Je ne veux pas voir Paris brûler" feat. Gia Martinelli				
2020	"Ensemble" feat. Eskemo				
2020	"J'aimerais tellement" feat. Romain Ughetto & Eskemo				

^{1} Digital downloads
