= Charlie Winston =

English singer-songwriter

- Winston at Venoge Festival in Switzerland in 2026

Background information
- Born: Charlie Winston Gleave; Cornwall, United Kingdom
- Origin: Bungay, England, United Kingdom
- Genres: Folk, indie folk, indie pop
- Label: AFishant Records
- Website: www.charliewinston.com

Charlie Winston Gleave, better known as Charlie Winston, is a British singer-songwriter based in the South of France. Winston has so far had his most significant commercial success in France.

== Music career ==
=== Early career ===
Winston played bass guitar for his brother Tom Baxter, appearing on Baxter's Feather and Stone album. As well as touring with Tom, much of Winston's early career saw him composing music for, and performing in, London-based contemporary theatre productions.

=== Mischifus ===
Winston's first ever unreleased and rarest record was Mischifus, a mix between beatbox, guitar, and piano, which appeared as a theatre/dance production that he had performed on stage in 2007, recorded under the Real World label.

=== Make Way ===
Winston's unreleased debut album, Make Way, was recorded at Real World Studios in 2006. Described as "inspired and seductive". Winston supported Peter Gabriel on his 2007 European tour. Tracks from Make Way would eventually find their way on to his first officially released album.

=== Hobo ===
Winston's second and the first officially released album, Hobo, entered the French charts at No. 3 on 31 January 2009, and peaked at No. 1 in its 25th charting week where it stayed for 4 weeks and, as of 5 July 2011, spent 30 weeks in the Top 10. His debut album has also been certified as being platinum.

The first single, "Like a Hobo", also topped the French SNEP charts for one week on 11 April 2009.

In 2010, Winston won a European Border Breakers Award for 'Best UK artist in Europe'.

=== Running Still ===
Winston's third album Running Still was released in France on 21 November 2011.

In 2012, Winston contributed the track "This Wheel's on Fire" to the compilation CD set for Amnesty International titled "Chimes of Freedom – The Songs of Bob Dylan".

=== Curio City ===
"Lately", the first single from Winston's fourth album Curio City debuted on French radio station Virgin Radio on 13 October 2014. The album was released on 26 January 2015. In 2016, Winston released an EP with studio versions of songs he covered live during his concerts, called Under Cover.

=== Square 1 ===
The first single from Winston's fifth album was released on 8 June 2018. It's called "The Weekend". The album, entitled Square 1, was released on 28 September 2018.

=== Love Isn't Easy ===
Winston's 6th album Love Isn't Easy was released on 10 October 2026.

=== US television ===
On 17 September 2010, Winston headlined a global telecast for the international day of peace Peace One Day with Jude Law and Sharon Stone.

On 10 November 2011, the track "She Went Quietly" was used over the ending of the mid-season finale of Grey's Anatomy (Season 8, Episode 9 "Dark Was The Night").

== VW Polo ad ==
In 2008, his cover of The Spencer Davis Group song "I'm a Man" appeared on a television advertisement for Volkswagen Polo. The ad featured a dog miming the words to the track, and received over 750 complaints from the RSPCA and TV viewers. The ad was not banned, despite the complaints.

== Personal life ==
Winston was born to parents Jeff and Julie Gleave. At an early age he moved to Bungay, Suffolk where his parents owned the King's Head Hotel. His elder brother, Tom Baxter, and younger sister, Vashti Anna, are also musicians and all use their middle name as a stage surname. Winston currently lives in the South of France on the French Riviera.

== Discography ==
=== Albums ===
Year	Album	Peak chart positions								
Year	Album	FRA	FRA (DD)^{1}	BEL (WA)	SWI	GER	AUT	GRE	UK	US
2007	Make Way	—	—	—	—	—	—	—	—	—
2009	Hobo	1	1	3	9	16	57	12	—	—
2011	Running Still	5	—	12	24	—	—	—	—	—
2015	Curio City	6	—	5	15	—	—	—	—	—
2018	Square 1	—	—	67	51	—	—	—	—	—
2022	As I Am	50	—	—	—	—	—	—	—	—
2026	Love Isn't Easy	—	—	—	—	—	—	—	—	—

=== Singles ===
Year	Single	Peak chart positions								
Year	Single	FRA	FRA (DD)^{1}	BEL (FL)	BEL (WA)	SWI	GER	AUT	UK	US
2009	"Like a Hobo"	1	3	—	3	27	11	8	—	—
2009	"In Your Hands"	9	17	—	16	46	—	—	—	—
2009	"Kick the Bucket"	—	32	—	16* (Ultratip)	—	—	—	—	—
2010	"I Love Your Smile"	—	—	—	—	—	—	—	—	—
2010	"Tongue Tied"	—	—	—	—	—	—	—	—	—
2011	"Secret Girl"	—	—	—	—	—	—	—	—	—
2011	"Hello Alone"	41	—	—	24	—	—	—	—	—
2012	"Where Can I Buy Happiness"	—	—	—	22* (Ultratip)	—	—	—	—	—
2012	"Speak to Me"	—	—	—	—	—	—	—	—	—
2014	"Lately"	88	—	30* (Ultratip)	5* (Ultratip)	—	—	—	—	—
2014	"Wilderness"	177	—	—	—	—	—	—	—	—
2015	"Truth"	101	—	99* (Ultratip)	10* (Ultratip)	—	—	—	—	—
2015	"Say Something"	—	—	—	—	—	—	—	—	—
2016	"Too Long"	—	—	—	—	—	—	—	—	—
2018	"Losing Touch"	—	—	—	—	—	—	—	—	—
2018	"The Weekend"	—	—	—	—	—	—	—	—	—
2019	"Rendez-Vous (feat. Camélia Jordana)"	—	—	—	—	—	—	—	—	—
2022	"Algorithm"	—	—	—	—	—	—	—	—	—
2022	"Exile"	—	—	—	—	—	—	—	—	—
2023	"I Am II"	—	—	—	—	—	—	—	—	—

^{1} Digital Downloads
*Did not appear in the official Belgian Ultratop 50 charts, but rather in the bubbling under Ultratip charts.

Featured in

Year	Single	Peak chart positions			Album
Year	Single	FRA	FRA (DD)	BEL (WA)	Album
2013	"Dusty Men" (Saule featuring Charlie Winston)	13		10	Saule album Géant
2017	"It's Not Impossible" (Stefano Lentini featuring Charlie Winston)				Stefano Lentini album La Porta Rossa (The Red Door)
