= Emmanuelle Bouaziz =

French actress, dancer and singer

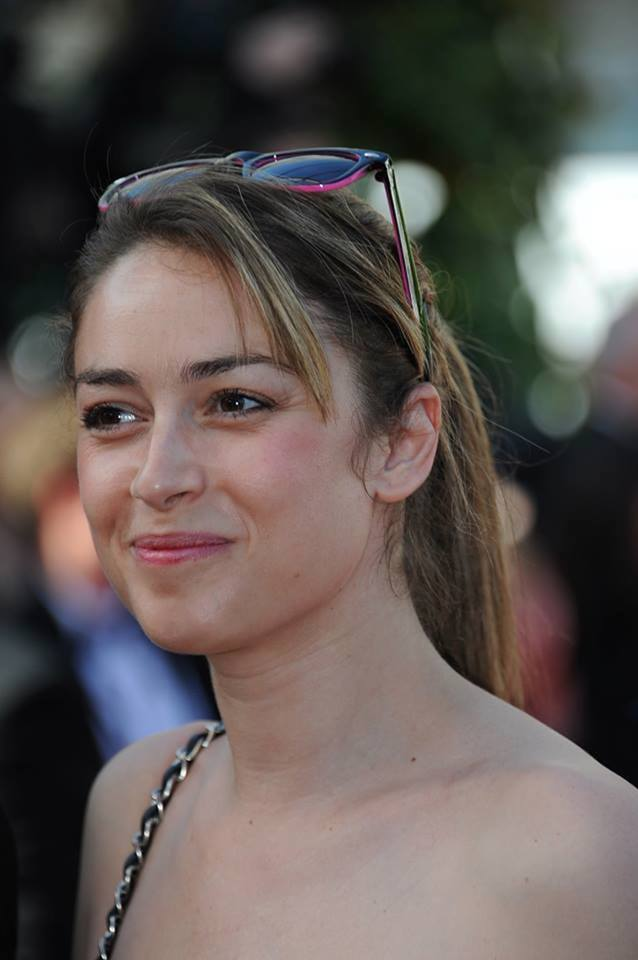
- Emmanuelle Bouaziz
- Born: France
- Occupations: Actress, singer, dancer

Emmanuelle Bouaziz (born 22 May) is a French actress, dancer and singer.

== Life and career ==
Emmanuelle Bouaziz studied dance at the Rick Odums Performing Arts Institute where she graduated as a dance teacher, and acting at cours Peyran-Lacroix in Paris and The Actor Centre in London.

She has appeared in the musicals Roméo et Juliette, Fame, Mamma Mia!, 1789: Les Amants de la Bastille, Emilie Jolie .

She also acts in films and TV series.

== Filmography ==
=== Film ===
- 2008 : Agathe Cléry by Etienne Chatiliez
- 2014 : Sous les jupes des filles by Audrey Dana
- 2014 : Allies by Dominic Burns
- 2018 : Deux Moi by Cédric Klapisch
- 2023 : Le Voyage en pyjama by Pascal Thomas

=== Short ===
- 2005 : Une majorette peut en cacher une autre by Lola Doillon
- 2013 : Two lines by Illoyd Campos et Nicolas Van Beveren

=== Television ===
- 2007 : Coktail de filles by Albin Voulfow
- 2008 : Pas de secrets entre nous by Pierre Leix-Côte
- 2008 : Les Bougon, series
- 2009 : Julie Lescaut, series
- 2009-2011 : Chante !, series
- 2010 : Mes amis, mes amours, mes emmerdes..., series
- 2011 : La nouvelle Blanche-Neige by Laurent Bénégui
- 2014 : Commissaire Magellan, series
- 2015 : Catastrophe, series by Ben Taylor
- 2016: EastEnders
- 2017: The White Princess, miniseries
- 2018 : Mike by Frédéric Hazan
- 2020 : J'ai menti by Frédéric Berthe
- 2020-2021 : Clem (saisons 10-11), series
- 2021 : Les Combattantes by Alexandre Laurent
- 2021 : Les invisibles, series
- 2023 : Un si grand soleil (saison 5/6/7/8), series

== Clip ==
- 1998 : Machistador by Matthieu Chedid
- 2002 : Mon amant de Saint-Jean by Patrick Bruel
- 2009 : Super héros by Oz
- 2014 : Maman m'avait dit by Dumè

== Musicals ==
- 2004 : Paradis d'amour - Paradis Latin
- 2005 : Beauty and the Beast by Alan Menken, Howard Ashman and Tim Rice - Disneyland Park (Paris)
- 2006 : Hôtel des cancans by Patrice Vrain Perrot - Paris
- 2007 : High school musical on tour by Katy Harris and Christophe Boschard - Disneyland Park
- 2007 : Roméo et Juliette by Gérard Presgurvic, dir Redha - Asia
- 2007-2008 : Big manoir by David Rozen - Paris
- 2008 : Kid manoir by David Rozen - Paris
- 2008 : The Tales of Hoffmann by Jacques Offenbach - Tour
- 2008 : Lady blue by Jonathan Kerr - Paris
- 2007-2009 : Aime et la Planète des Signes by Jean Louis Grinda - Paris
- 2009 : La Vie parisienne by Jacques Offenbach - Massy
- 2009 : Fame by José Fernandez, Jacques Levy, Steve Margoshes, dir Ned Grujic - Theatrical National Tour
- 2010 : Generation Moonwalk, tribute to Michael Jackson by Aurore Stauder - Zénith de Paris
- 2009-2010 : Les nouvelles aventures de Robin des Bois by Fred Colas - Théâtre Le Temple
- 2010-2011 : Mamma Mia! by Benny Andersson and Björn Ulvaeus, Phyllida Lloyd - Théâtre Mogador
- 2011 : Le fabuleux rêve d'Amélie by Aude Henneville - L'Olympia
- 2012-2013 : 1789 : Les Amants de la Bastille by Dove Attia and François Chouquet - Palais des Sports de Paris, tour
- 2014-2015 : La folle histoire du Petit Chaperon Rouge by Pascal Joseph and Nicolas Giraud - Paris
- 2015 : Flashdance dir Philippe Hersen - Théâtre du Gymnase
- 2017-2019: Émilie Jolie by Philippe Chatel - Theatrical National Tour

== Choreographer ==
- 2009 : Les nouvelles aventures de Robin des Bois by Fred Colas - Théâtre Le Temple
- 2017-2019 : Émilie Jolie by Philippe Chatel - Theatrical National Tour & L'Olympia

== Theatre ==
- 2009-2010 : La bombe by Carole Greep - Théâtre Le Temple, Paris, tour
- 2010-2011 : V.O.S. by Carol Lopez- Theatre Pixel, Paris
- 2017-2018 : L'Adieu à la Scène by Jacques Forgeas - dir Sophie Gubri Festival d'Avignon, Paris
