= Sophie Delmas =

French singer

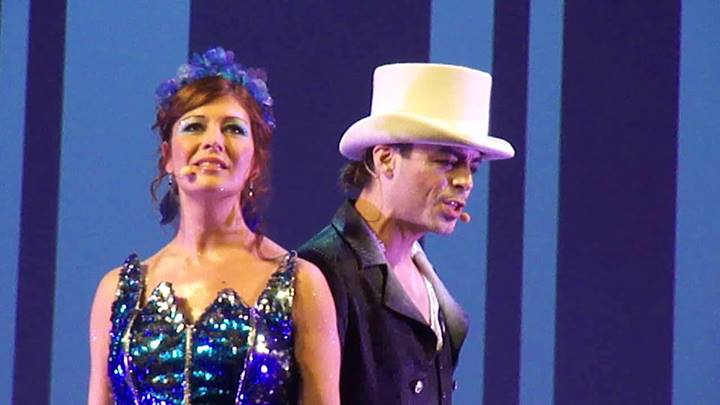
- Sophie Delmas and Nuno Resende in Pinocchio, le spectacle musical (2013)
- Born: Toulouse, France
- Occupation(s): actress, singer

Sophie Delmas is a French actress and singer.

== Biography ==
Delmas was born to a Bohemian family. She is the grandchild of opera singers and began her training at the Studio des Variétés.

She sang with Marcel Mouloudji. She then toured for two years with the trio 3 fois Danger and sang with the gospel chorus of Mariah Carey in Bercy in 1996.

In 1997, Delmas released a single Je le veux, written by François Valéry.

Then she began performing in musicals, starting with Un Conte de Noël in 2000 at the Théâtre de la Porte Saint-Martin. She then played Aurore in L’Ombre d’un géant at Théâtre Mogador in 2002.

In 2003, she played the part of Belle Watling in Autant en emporte le vent by Gérard Presgurvic and Kamel Ouali at the Palais des Sports de Paris.

After this, she decided to create the show Showllywood in which she challenged the standards of Hollywood musical movies. Pierre Cardin invited her to the Municipal Theatre of Ho Chi Minh City, where she gave = a televised recital of French songs, Bonjour Paris. She toured for the French embassies in the Middle East, the Near East and Iceland.

She began vocal coaching and stage directing at Richard Cross' Centre de Formation Vocale.

In 2009, Delmas played the part of both witches in the musical Dothy et le Magicien d’Oz by Dove Attia and Albert Cohen at the Grand Rex. She received critical acclaim for her performance.

She voiced the singing parts of Mother Gothel for the French dub of the Disney animated film Tangled, alongside Isabelle Adjani who voiced the speaking parts.

At the end of 2010, she starred as Donna Sheridan in the French version of Mamma Mia!. The show toured France in 2012 and 2013.

In 2013, she sang with Les grandes voix des comédies musicales chantent pour les enfants hospitalisés alongside Renaud Hantson, Mikelangelo Loconte and Lââm for the single Un faux départ.

From October 2013 to January 2014, she played the Blue Fairy in Pinocchio, le spectacle musical in Paris opposite Pablo Villafranca and Nuno Resende.

Delmas participated in the 2014 edition of The Voice in Florent Pagny's team.

== Musicals ==
- 2000 : Un conte de Noël by William Korso, Pierre-Alain Perez - Théâtre de la Porte-Saint-Martin
- 2002 : L'Ombre d'un géant by François Valéry - Théâtre Mogador
- 2003 : Autant en emporte le vent by Gérard Presgurvic and Kamel Ouali - Palais des Sports de Paris
- 2007 : Rimbaud musical by Richard Charest and Arnaud Kerane - Vingtième Théâtre, Théâtre Comédia
- 2009 : Dothy et le Magicien d'Oz by Dove Attia and Albert Cohen - Grand Rex
- 2010-2013 : Mamma Mia! by Catherine Johnson - Théâtre Mogador, tour
- 2013-2014 : Pinocchio, le spectacle musical by Marie-Jo Zarb and Moria Némo - Théâtre de Paris, tour
- 2014-2015 : The Wizard of Oz by Andrew Lloyd Webber, dir Jeremy Sams - Palais des Congrès de Paris, tour

== Discography ==
=== Singles ===
- 1997 : Je le veux
- 2001 : Pour aimer plus fort : Hanna H, Rose Laurens and Sophie Delmas, from L'Ombre d'un géant
- 2002 : Rêver d'être une star, from L'Ombre d'un géant
- 2011 : Le chemin, for the NGO Winds Peace Japan
- 2013 : Un faux départ with the collective Les grandes voix des comédies musicales

=== Albums ===
- 2001 : L'Ombre d'un géant
- 2003 : Autant en emporte le vent
- 2009 : Dothy et le Magicien d'Oz
- 2010 : Tangled
- 2013 : Pinocchio, le spectacle musical

=== DVD ===
- 2004 : Autant en emporte le vent
- 2009 : Dothy et le Magicien d'Oz

== Voice acting ==
- 2010 : Tangled (French dubbing)
- 2021–present : Baby Shark's Big Show! (Goldie, French dub)
