= Nuno Resende =

Portuguese singer

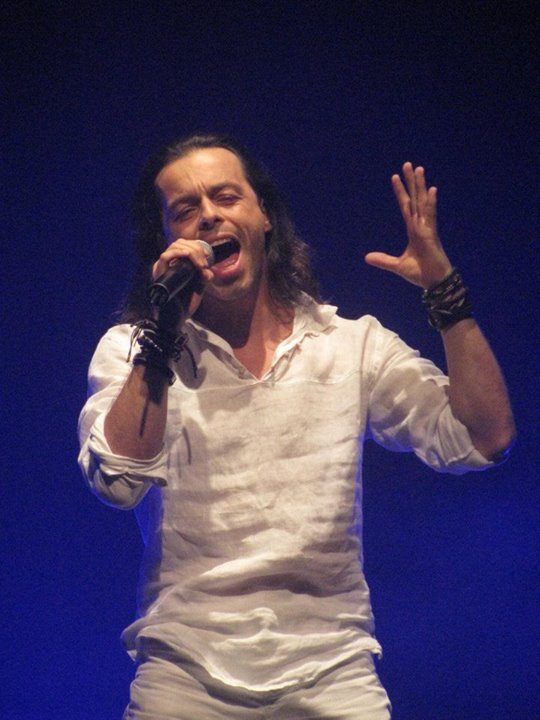
- Nuno Resende in 2013

Background information
- Born: 25 June 1973 (age 52); Porto, Portugal
- Genres: Chanson, French pop
- Years active: 1998–present
- Labels: EMI, Capitol Records
- Website: Official Site

Nuno Resende (born 25 June 1973) is a Portuguese singer.

== Biography ==
=== Early life ===
Nuno was born in Porto, and is an only child. He enrolled at the French school of Porto when he was 5. His family moved to Belgium when he was 12. He is also a Belgian national. As a sport fanatic, he took a training in sports. In 1985, he was admitted into the European School of Brussels. He took part in tournaments, especially the Espérance tennis tournament. Between 1993 and 1996, he attended the Physical Education School where he took a teacher training course for regents. He then decided to attempt a musical career.

He formed many hard-rock bands. He takes part in Pour la Gloire, a talent contest on the RTBF in 1997. In 1998, Alec Mansion formed a band, La Teuf, in which Nuno sang. In 2000, the band was part of the Belgian selection for the Eurovision Song Contest with the song Soldat de l’amour. He got through to the finals, but he was eliminated and the band split the same year.

Alec Mansion noticed the beauty of his voice and hired him for different projects and chorus sessions in Belgium.

In 1999, the singer played the part of Gontrand in the musical La Belle et la Bête, with Luc de Walter (The Voice, Belgium). The same year, Nuno got into the band Apy and recorded a rerun of Lio’s Banana Split.

=== From musicals to Eurovision (2000–08) ===
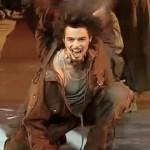
Nuno Resende in Les Demoiselles de Rochefort (2003)

In 2000, under the pseudonym of Nuno, he sings Allez, allez, allez, the official song of the Belgian football team nicknamed Les Diables rouges. From 2000 to the end of 2002, Nuno Resende is an understudy in Roméo et Juliette, de la Haine à l'Amour, by Gérard Presgurvic. The cast wins the NRJ Music Award of the Francophone song in 2001.

In 2003, he takes part in the musical Les Demoiselles de Rochefort.

In 2005, Resende represented Belgium in the Eurovision Song Contest 2005 with the song Le Grand Soir (The Big Night), composed by Alec Mansion and Frédéric Zeitoun. He does not get through to the finals, with only 29 points, and ends 22nd out of 25 contestants in the semi-final.

In 2007, he plays the leading part in the musical Aladin, with Florence Coste, at the Palais des congrès de Paris and then in the French Zéniths. Nuno is nominated to the Marius for his performance.

From September 2008 to January 2009 he plays the parts of Roger and Dany in the musical Grease in Paris. The production is nominated to the Globes de Cristal Award in 2009.

=== Mozart l’opéra rock and Adam et Eve, la seconde chance (2009–2012) ===
At the beginning of 2009, he gets back with the cast of Roméo et Juliette, les enfants de Vérone; for a tour in South Korea where he is the understudy of both Roméo and Benvolio. Then he tours with the musical Aladin in the French Zeniths until May 2009.

From 2009 to 2011, he enters into the troupe of Mozart, l'opéra rock as the understudy of Mikelangelo Loconte. He interprets also the parts of Gottlieb Stéphanie and Joseph Lange. He was given the opportunity to play Mozart for the first time on 29 April 2010 for the show premiere in Brussels (Belgium), and once again on 13 May in Lyon (France). The show wins two NRJ Music Awards : the Francophone song of the year and the French band-duet-cast of 2010.

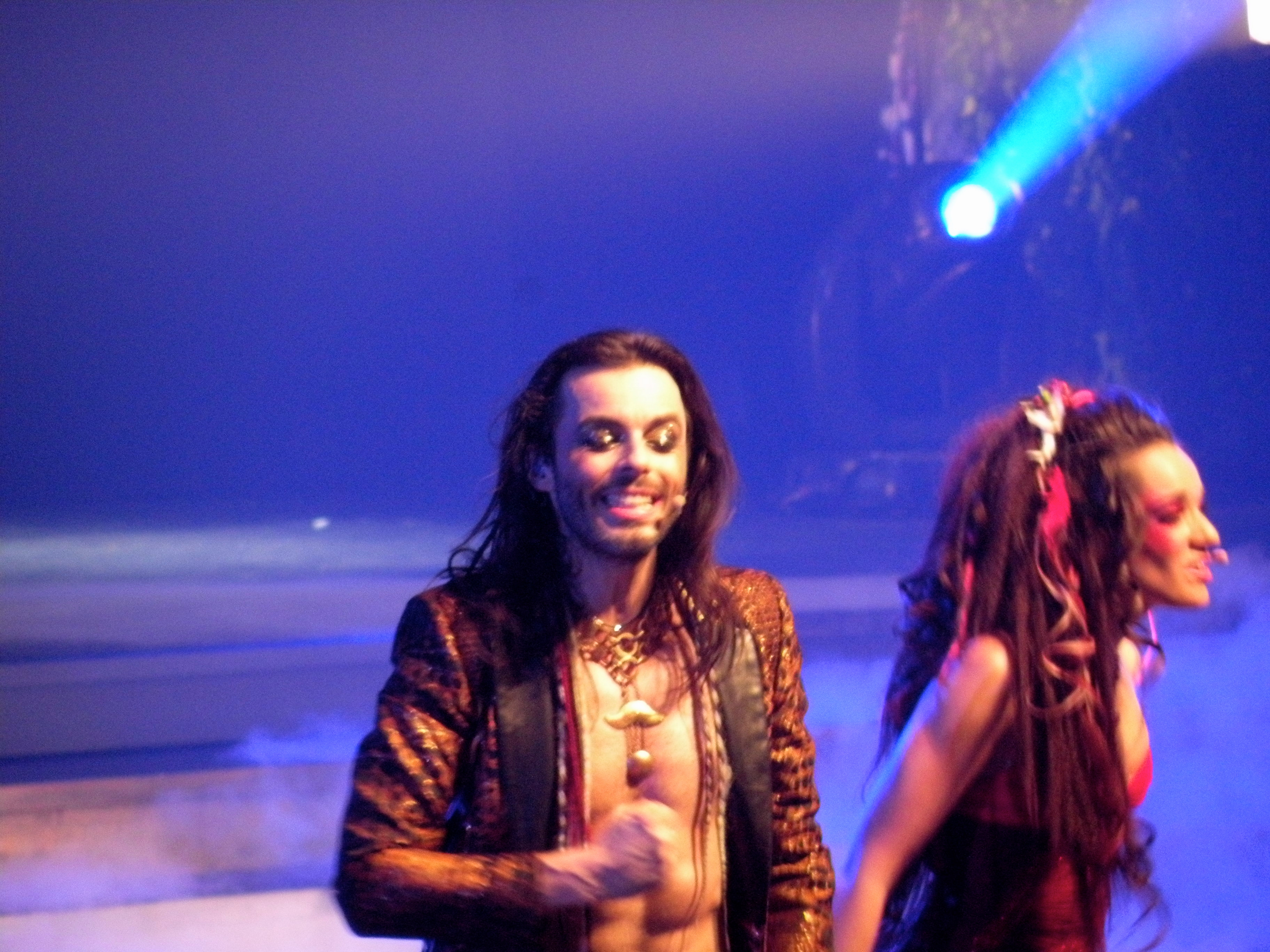
Nuno Resende and Noémie Garcia in Adam et Eve (2012)

In 2012, he plays the part of Snake, in the musical Adam et Ève : La Seconde Chance by Pascal Obispo at the Palais des sports de Paris along with Thierry Amiel and Cylia, the major actors in the show. The tour which should have started in September 2012 is cancelled due to the lack of money.

In October 2012, he joins the troupe of the musical Erzsebeth which inspired from Elizabeth Bathory’s life, the famous Hungarian countess. Nuno plays the part of Thurzo, Elizabeth's lover. The musical took place in Belgium.

=== From The Voice to Latin lovers (2013–14) ===
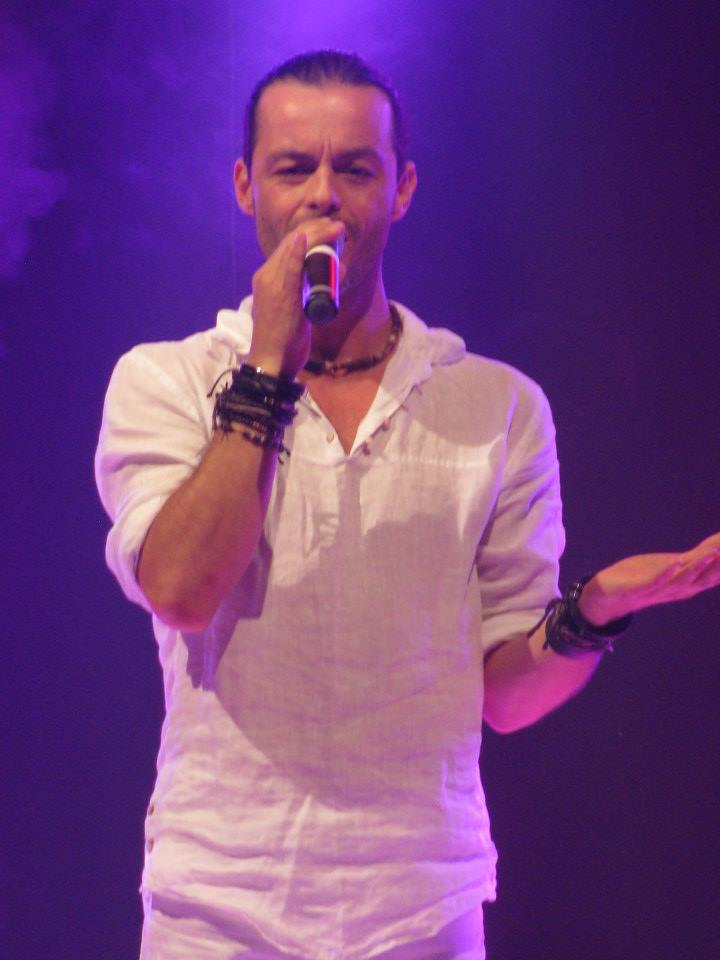
Nuno Resende (2013)

Nuno is in the second season of The Voice (France). He gets into Florent Pagny’s team and gets through to the finals. He finishes third, behind Olympe and the winner Yoann Fréget. He is one of the eight contestants qualified for The Voice Tour which plays in the French Zeniths and in Lebanon.

During the summer, he is invited in various festivals and among others, Festival d'Avignon, where he sings some French and international standards. He released a DVD from his concerts called Interlude Musical.

From October to January 2014, he played the part of Maître Grigri, a.k.a. Jiminy Cricket in Pinocchio in Paris with, among others Vanessa Cailhol, Pablo Villafranca and Sophie Delmas. Couper les Liens, one of the songs he sings is nominated for the French Prix de la Création musicale in 2014.

In 2014, he joins the band Latin Lovers with Julio Iglesias Jr. and Damien Sargue.

In October, he plays the role of the Idole in Salut les copains.

== Charity involvement ==
Nuno Resende takes regularly part in charity concerts. In 2012, he sings at the Foot Concert, created by Michaël Jones and Joël Bats, in aid of the Huntington Avenir Association.

In 2013, he is also on stage with Yannick Noah and they sing for the association Les Enfants de la Terre. He takes part to the concert Freddie for a Day organized by the Mercury Phoenix Trust which collects funds for the associations against AIDS.

He joins the band of artists of Les grandes voix des Comédies Musicales chantent pour les enfants hospitalisés with, among others, Renaud Hantson, Mikelangelo Loconte and Lââm for the single Un faux départ.

== Musicals ==
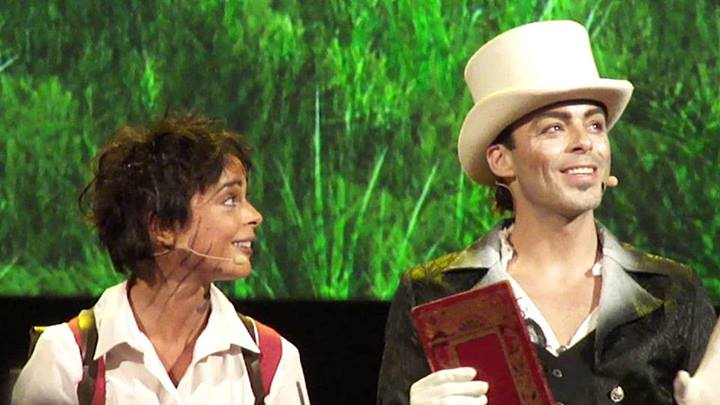
Vanessa Cailhol and Nuno Resende in Pinocchio, le spectacle musical (2013)

- 1999 : La Belle et la Bête by Sylvain Meyniac - Belgium, France
- 2000-2002 : Roméo et Juliette, de la Haine à l'Amour by Gérard Presgurvic, dir Redha - Palais des congrès de Paris, tour
- 2003 : Les Demoiselles de Rochefort by Michel Legrand and Alain Boublil, dir Redha - Zénith de Lille, Palais des congrès de Paris
- 2007-2009 : Aladin by Jeanne Deschaux and Jean-Philippe Daguerre - Palais des congrès de Paris, tour
- 2008-2009 : Grease by Jim Jacobs, Warren Casey and Stéphane Laporte - Théâtre Comédia de Paris, Palais des congrès de Paris
- 2009 : Roméo et Juliette, de la Haine à l'Amour by Gérard Presgurvic, dir Redha - South Korea
- 2009-2011 : Mozart, l'opéra rock by Dove Attia and Albert Cohen, dir Olivier Dahan - Palais des sports de Paris, tour, Palais omnisports de Paris-Bercy
- 2012 : Adam et Ève : La Seconde Chance by Pascal Obispo and Jean-Marie Duprez, dir Mark Fisher and Pascal Obispo - Palais des sports de Paris
- 2012 : Erzsebeth, le spectacle musical by Stéphane et Brigitte Decoster - Belgium
- 2013-2014 : Pinocchio by Marie-Jo Zarb and Moria Némo, dir Marie-Jo Zarb - Théâtre de Paris, tour
- 2014 : Salut les copains by Pascal Forneri, dir Stéphane Jarny - Folies Bergère, tour
- 2016 : Mozart, l'opéra rock - South Korea Tour

== Discography ==
=== Albums ===
- 1999: La Belle et la Bête
- 1999: La Teuf
- 2003: Les Demoiselles de Rochefort
- 2007: Aladin
- 2011: Adam et Ève : La Seconde Chance
- 2013: Erzsebeth, le spectacle musical
- 2013: Pinocchio, le spectacle musical
- 2014: Latin Lovers

=== Singles ===
- With the band La Teuf:
  - 1999: Envie de faire la teuf
  - 1999: À cause du sexe
  - 1999: Te quiero, ti amo, I love you, je t'aime
  - 2000: Soldat de l'amour
- With the band Apy:
  - 1999: Banana Split by Lio
  - 1999: Serre-moi, griffe-moi by Claude François
  - 2000: Fana de toi
  - 2000: Allez allez allez
  - 2001: The only one for me com with the group Club Code
  - 2002: Un seul mot d'amour with Clémence Saint-Preux, Philippe d'Avilla and Pino Santoro
  - 2002: J'suis petit with Philippe d'Avilla and Pino Santoro
  - 2005: Le Grand Soir representing Bélgium : Eurovision Song Contest
  - 2007: On se reconnaîtra with Florence Coste
  - 2008: Khong Phai Em with Đàm Vĩnh Hưng
  - 2010: Les Vainqueurs de la Ligue de Sinnoh, Pokémon
- From Adam et Ève: La Seconde Chance:
  - 2011: Ma bataille with Thierry Amiel
  - 2012: Aimez-vous with Cylia
- From The Voice:
  - 2013: Music by John Miles
  - 2013: En apesanteur by Calogero
  - 2013: Il suffira d'un signe by Jean-Jacques Goldman
  - 2013: The Great Pretender by The Platters
  - 2013: Un faux départ with the collective Les grandes voix des comédies musicales
- With the band Latin Lovers:
  - 2014: Vous les femmes by Julio Iglesias
  - 2014: La Camisa Negra by Juanes

=== Participations ===
- 2014: "Hotel California" in duet with Chico and the Gypsies on the album Chico & The Gypsies & International Friends

=== DVD ===
- 2004: Les Demoiselles de Rochefort
- 2010: Mozart, l'opéra rock
- 2012: Adam et Ève : La Seconde Chance
- 2013: Interlude Musical
- 2014: Live à l'Acte 3

Preceded by Xandee with "1 Life"	Belgium in the Eurovision Song Contest; 2005	Succeeded by Kate Ryan with "Je t'adore"
