= Laurent Bàn =

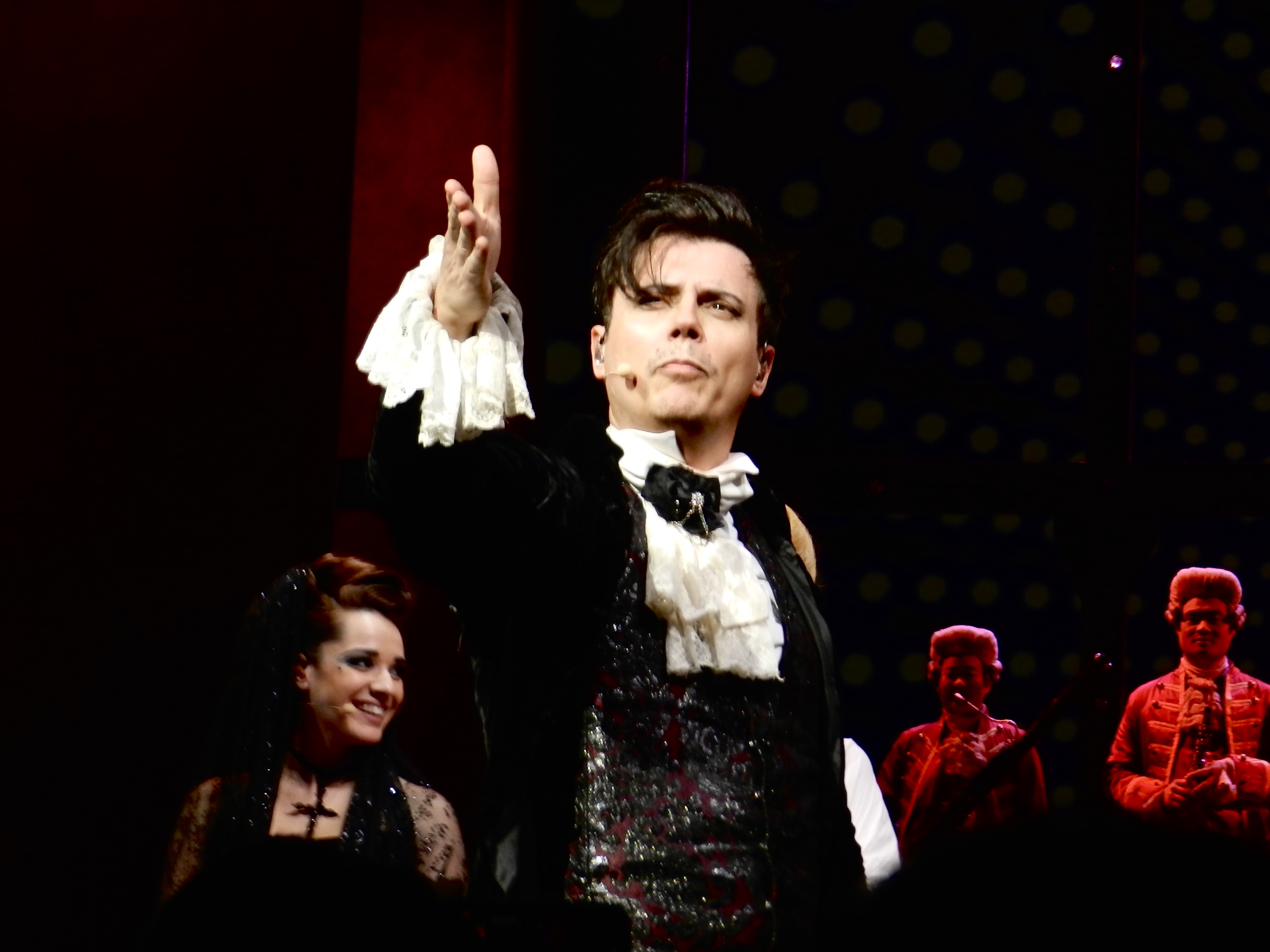
- Ban as Salieri (Mozart l'opera Rock January 27, 2019 in Shenzhen)

Background information
- Born: Briey, France
- Genres: Rock; French pop
- Occupation: Singer-songwriter
- Years active: 1998–present
- Website: laurentban.com

Laurent Bàn (born 3 April 1973 in Briey, France) is a French singer-songwriter.

== Biography ==
Laurent Bàn obtained a degree as a graphic designer-painter. He discovered the French musical Starmania from Michel Berger and Luc Plamondon and decided to study music and acting at the Nancy's conservatory.

=== Musicals ===
He moved to Paris and played his first role in Alfredo Arias's musical : Heartbreak of an English she-cat (Peines de cœur d'une chatte anglaise) which won Molière awards for its staging and costumes in 2000. Then he played in many musicals : Hair, Notre-Dame de Paris, Zorro... Laurent Bàn also performed on international's stages. In Italy he played in two musicals in Italian : Il Conte di Montecristo and Amleto, Dramma Musicale produced by Pierre Cardin. He participated in famous French musicals' tour in Asia of Notre-Dame de Paris and for the first time in Mozart, l'opéra rock playing Salieri.

=== Author ===
Laurent Bàn is the author of two French adaptations' musicals : Le Journal d'Adam et Eve and Marlène D. The Legend. He also leads a solo career. In 2005 his first album is edited : Ante. In 2016 Anteprima contains two tracks. His third album Prima is edited in 2018.

== Musicals ==
=== Actor ===
- 1999-2001 : Heartbreak of an English she-cat (Les peines de cœur d'une chatte française) by Alfredo Arias and René de Ceccaty - MC93 Bobigny, tour France and Italy : Victor
- 2001 : Hair by James Rado, Gerome Ragni and Galt MacDermot, dir Sylvain Meyniac - Auditorium of Saint-Germain-des-Prés : Woof
- 2001-2002 : Notre-Dame de Paris by Luc Plamondon and Richard Cocciante - Théâtre Mogador : Gringore and Phoebus
- 2002-2003 : Le Petit Prince by Richard Cocciante and Élisabeth Anaïs, dir Jean-Louis Martinoty - Casino de Paris : Le Vaniteux
- 2004 : Singin in Paris - Atrium Musical Magne, Hôtel Brossier
- 2004 : Chance ! by Hervé Devolder - Lucernaire : Fred
- 2005-2006 : Notre-Dame de Paris by Luc Plamondon and Richard Cocciante - Palais des congrès de Paris, tour in Asia : Phoebus
- 2007 : Les Hors-la-loi by Alexandre Bonstein, dir Agnès Boury - Théâtre Marigny, tour : Carlo
- 2007 : Le Petit Prince by Richard Cocciante and Élisabeth Anaïs, dir Jean-Louis Martinoty - Tour in Asia : L'aviateur
- 2008 : Il Conte di Montecristo : The Musical by Francesco Marchetti, dir Gino Landi - Rome : Villefort
- 2009 : Zorro by Stephen Clark, adaptation Éric Taraud and Marie-Jo Zarb, dir Christopher Renshaw, music Gipsy Kings - Folies Bergère : Zorro
- 2009-2011 : Le Journal d'Adam et Eve by Mark Twain and Riccardo Castagnari, translation by Chiara Di Bari, adaptation by Laurent Bàn, dir Franck Harscouët - Lourdes, Le Grand Rex : Adam
- 2009-2012 : Hair by James Rado, Gerome Ragni and Galt MacDermot, dir Ned Grujic - Le Trianon, tournée : Berger
- 2013 : Là était l'Eden by Mark Twain and Riccardo Castagnari, translation by Chiara Di Bari, adaptation by Laurent Bàn, dir Franck Harscouët - Théâtre Michel : Adam
- 2013-2014 : Amleto, Dramma Musicale by and dir Daniele Martini - Florence, Les Ambassadeurs in Paris : Hamlet
- 2013-2014 : Farouche show, Royal Palace de Kirrwiller
- 2015-2016 : Aladin, faites un vœu ! by David Rozen and Marie-Jo Zarb - Théâtre Comédia, tour : Le Génie
- 2015 : Mistinguett, reine des années folles by François Chouquet, Jacques Pessis and Ludovic-Alexandre Vidal, dir François Chouquet - Théâtre Comédia : Harry Pilcer
- 2016 : Mozart, l'opéra rock by Dove Attia and Albert Cohen - South Korea : Salieri
- 2017-2018 : Priscilla, Queen of the Desert, dir. Philippe Hersen - Casino de Paris : Dick
- 2018 : Mozart, l'opéra rock by Dove Attia and Albert Cohen - Shanghai
- 2018-2019 : Mozart, l'opéra rock by Dove Attia and Albert Cohen - Tour in China : Salieri
- 2021 : Les Misérables by Victor Hugo - South Korea : Jean Valjean
- 2021-2022: Notre Dame de Paris by Luc Plamondon and Richard Cocciante - Frollo

=== Author ===
- 2009 : Marlène D. The Legend by and dir by Riccardo Castagnari, adaptation by Laurent Bàn, translation by Chiara Di Bari - Vingtième Théâtre, Paris
- 2009 : Le Journal d'Adam et Eve by Mark Twain and Riccardo Castagnari, adaptation by Laurent Bàn, translation by Chiara Di Bari, dir Franck Harscouët - Lourdes

== Discography ==
=== Albums ===
- 2005 : Ante
- 2016 : Anteprima
- 2018 : Prima
- 2024 : Aura

=== Single ===
- 2014 : Tu me mets à mort

== Filmography ==
- 2004 : The Phantom of the Opera by Joel Schumacher : Erik's French voice

== Award ==
- 2009 : Marius of best musical, French adaptation for Marlène D. The Legend
