= Merwan Rim =

French actor and singer-songwriter (born 1977)

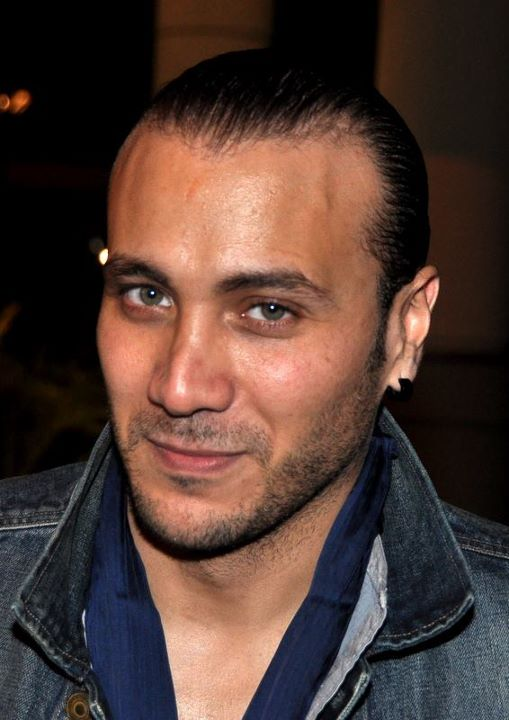
- Rim in January 2012 at the NRJ Music Awards ceremony
- Born: Merwan Rim; 13 July 1977 (age 47); Sarcelles, France
- Citizenship: France
- Occupation(s): Actor, musical performer, musician, singer, songwriter
- Years active: 2001–present
- Agent: Yves-Michel Aklé
- Known for: Le Roi Soleil, Mozart, l'opéra rock
- Website: www.merwanrim.fr

Merwan Rim (born 13 July 1977 in Sarcelles, France) is a French actor and singer-songwriter.

== Biography ==
At the age of 17, Merwan Rim started to learn and instruments as an autodidact. Realizing his gift in musical arts, Merwan decided to become a full-time musician. This decision led him into quitting Paris 13 University where he attended communication studies to enroll in Alice Dona Studios, a performing arts school for future professionals in September 2000. Nine months later, Merwan was cast as Ramses in the musical Les Dix Commandements. He first was Pow-Wow member Ahmed Mouici's alternate before he took over the role on one year later.

In 2004, Merwan enrolled in Elie Chouraqui and Maxime Le Forestier's musical entitled Spartacus in which he was cast as David's stand-in but he never had the occasion to portray the role. Nevertheless, Merwan avoided a show's being cancelled at the last minute by replacing Pow-Wow member Alain Chennevière (who portrayed Crassus) at the drop of the hat, calling himself "the stand-in ès Pow-Wow".

Soon after, Merwan was chosen to portray François, Duke of Beaufort in the musical Le Roi Soleil which opened for two seasons in Paris on 22 September 2005. Even though he was not the star of the show, Merwan gathered a huge fandom thanks to his pleasant character tinged with shyness.

In 2007, Merwan recorded two duets with Canadian singer Marilou. The first C'était écrit for the Canadian version of Marilou's album (released on 8 May 2007) and the second Danser sur la lune for the European version (released on 25 June 2007). After the end of Le Roi Soleil, Merwan began touring France with his musicians to promote his future solo album due to release in 2012.

On 1 June 2009, Merwan announced he had been cast on the musical Mozart L'Opéra-Rock for the roles of L'Aubergiste and the Clown Démoniaque. In addition to his two roles, Merwan is also an alternate for Antonio Salieri (portrayed by Florent Mothe). The musical opened on 22 September 2009 in Paris and had a phenomenal success.

Merwan Rim's solo debut single, entitled "Vous" (meaning you in French), is available for legal download since 2 May 2011.

== Discography ==
=== Albums ===
Year	Single	Charts		Certification	Album
Year	Single	BEL Wa	FR	Certification	Album
2012	L'échappée	70	12		

=== Singles ===
Year	Single	Charts		Certification	Album
Year	Single	BEL Wa	FR	Certification	Album
2007	"Danser sur la lune" (with Marilou Bourdon)	—	11		
2011	"Vous" (sometimes "Vous...")	—	20		
2011	"Mens-moi"	—	78		
2012	"Un nouveau jour" (with Jamie Hartman)	—	—		

Singles with "Mozart" Troupe

Year	Single	Charts		Certification	Album
Year	Single	BEL Wa	FR	Certification	Album
2010	"Le bien qui fait mal" / "Vivre à en crever"	—	9		
2010	"C'est bientôt la fin"	—	22		

== Appearances ==
Appearances in musical soundtrack recordings

- 2004: Spartacus le Gladiateur (Original Cast - as a chorist)
- 2005: Le Roi Soleil (Original cast, as Beaufort) (Warner)
- 2009: Mozart L'Opéra-Rock (Original Cast, 2 songs) (Warner)

Guest appearances

- 2007: "Danser sur la lune" with Marilou in her album Marilou—European release
- 2007: "C'était écrit" with Marilou in album Marilou—Canadian release
- 2009: "Atmosphère" (Oneshotrecord feat. Merwan Rim)

== Musical theater ==
- 2006: Le Roi Soleil - as François de Vendôme, Duc de Beaufort
- 2010: Mozart L'Opéra-Rock - as L'Aubergiste, Le Clown Démoniaque (as a main cast member) and Antonio Salieri (as an alternate)

== Awards and nominations ==
- In 2012, he was nominated for the category "NRJ Music Award of the Francophone Revelation of the Year" at the NRJ Music Awards.
