= Vincent Baguian =

French singer (born 1962)

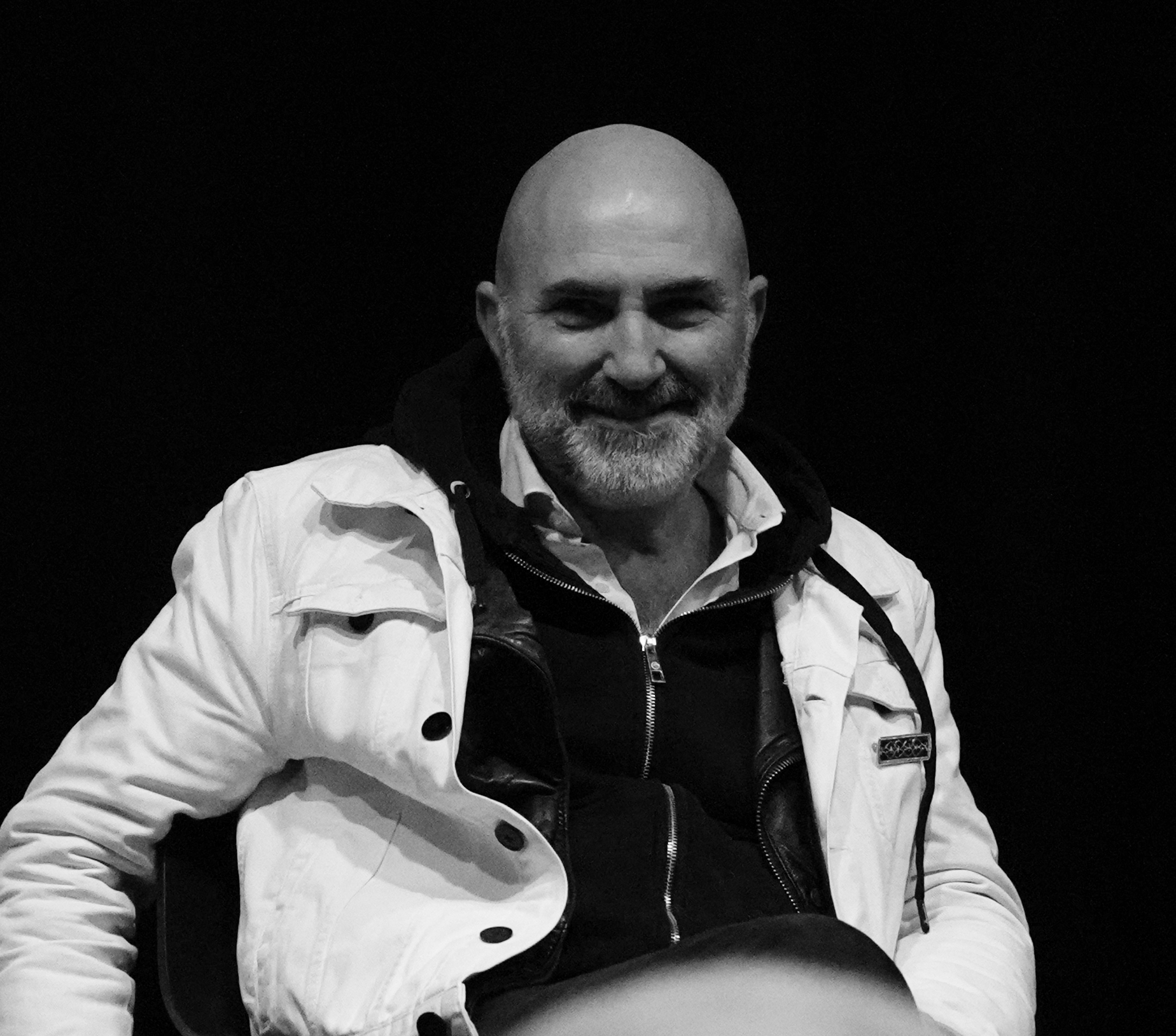
2025

Vincent Baguian, born Vincent Pambaguian (Վենսան Փամբակյան in Armenian), 21 October 1962 in Saint-Ouen, is a French singer of Armenian origin.

== Biography ==
Baguian's parents were both civil servants in the PTT, and at 18 he began to work as a runner in an advertising agency where he became a director-editor, notably for albums by Serge Gainsbourg.

At the same time, he began a career as a singer: in 1991, he recorded his first album, Triste, which sold 71 copies. More success came in 1996 with Pas mal, and particularly with Mes chants in 2000, a collection of caustic and poetic songs, full of puns. In 2007 came the album Ce soir, c'est moi qui fais la fille.

Vincent Baguian is a friend of the singer Zazie, for whom he has written many songs, and opened many concerts. They have recorded duets such as Simple comme bonjour (on Mes chants), and Je ne t'aime pas (on Ze Live !! by Zazie). They also worked together on the musical tale Sol En Cirque (2003) for the anti-AIDS association Sol En Si.

Vincent Baguian is also the author of many songs on the album Je ne mâche pas les mots (2006) by Elisa Tovati. He also wrote the musical comedies Mozart, l'opéra rock, 1789 : Les Amants de la Bastille, Mistinguett, reine des années folles and Le Rouge et le Noir.

== Discography ==
- Triste (1991)
- Pas mal (1996) (Cargo/Columbia)
- Mes chants (2000) (Columbia)
- Ce soir c'est moi qui fais la fille (2007) (Mercury)
