= Aimons-nous vivants =

Aimons-nous vivants may refer to:

- Aimons-nous vivants, 1989 album by François Valéry. See Discography section
  - "Aimons-nous vivants", 1989 single by François Valéry from his same-titled album. See Discography section
- Aimons-nous vivants, 2021 album by Sadek. See Discography section
