= Marie-Jo Zarb =

French lyricist, director and producer

Marie-Jo Zarb is a French lyricist, director and producer.

== Career ==
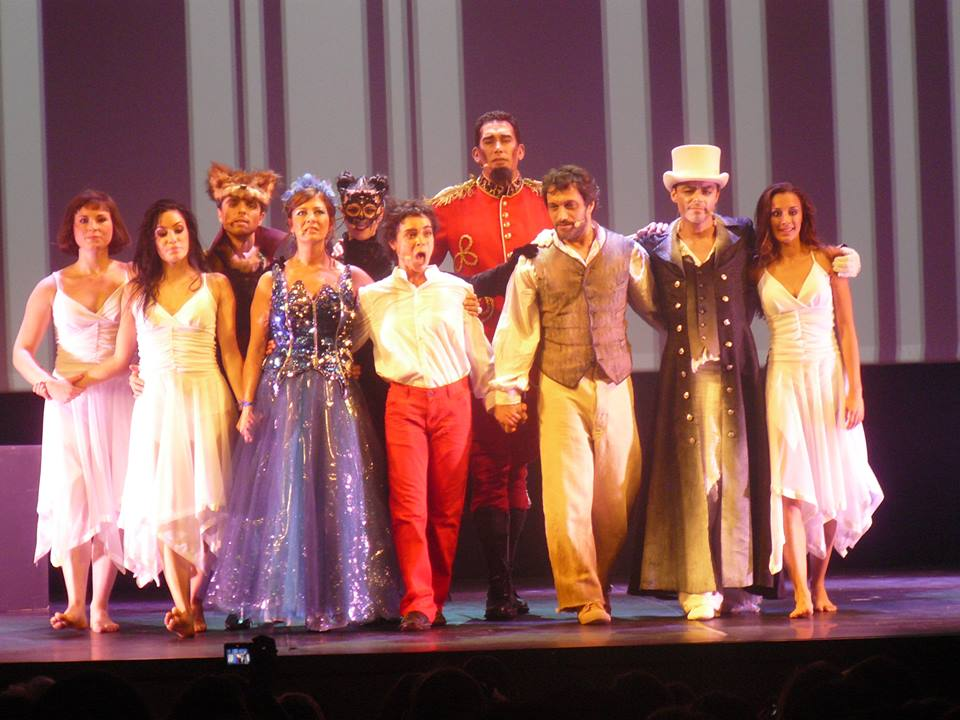
The troop of Pinocchio (2013)

After her literature studies, Marie-Jo Zarb met Bruno Pelletier, the francophone Quebecer singer, in 1993, and wrote many songs for him. Thanks to this first experience, she worked with Native, a French band, and with Francis Lai for the musical Les Sales Gosses. She worked for Sony, the record company, and wrote for Herbert Léonard, Larusso and the Sol En Si artists, among others.

In 2000, she met Pascal Obispo, Lionel Florence, got into Atletico songwriters pole, where she wrote, in particular for Patrick Fiori, Lââm, Julie Zenatti, Tina Arena, Patricia Kaas, Florent Pagny.

In 2009, she was involved in the French musical adaptation of Zorro, with Laurent Bàn in the title role, then founded Aeternalis Music, her own production company, with Sylvain Bonnet.

She sits on the variety committee at the French Sacem and runs writing workshops at the Music Academy International in Nancy.

In 2013, she wrote and produced Pinocchio, a musical for the stage, based on Carlo Collodi’s novel, in Paris. Moria Nemo wrote the music and Pablo Villafranca, Nuno Resende, Sophie Delmas and Vanessa Cailhol played the leading parts. Marie-Jo Zarb was nominated for the French Prix de la Création Musicale for the song "Couper les liens".

== Exhaustive list of collaborations ==
- 1995 : Je n'attends plus demain, Lié par le sang, Pris au piège, En manque de toi, Ailleurs c'est comme ici - Bruno Pelletier
- 1995 : Sans différences, sans contre-jour - Album Sol En Si
- 1998 : Regarde-moi, Une autre histoire - Herbert Léonard
- 1999 : Vivre sa vie, S'en aller, Personne n'est à personne - Bruno Pelletier
- 1999 : Rien ne peut séparer, Si le ciel, Come back to me - Larusso
- 2000 : Matin de blues, Saoul de mes dessous - Gunvor
- 2000 : Juste une raison encore - Patrick Fiori
- 2000 : Tout s'en va, Pour y croire encore - Julie Zenatti
- 2001 : On n'oublie pas d'où l'on vient - Florent Pagny et Pascal Obispo
- 2001 : Laissez nous croire, Que l'amour nous garde, Une vie ne suffit pas - Lââm
- 2001 : Juste pour quelqu'un, Après, Tout le monde pleure - Pablo Villafranca
- 2001 : Si je ne t'aimais pas - Tina Arena
- 2002 : On s'en va - Christiana Marocco
- 2002 : Tant qu'il nous reste - Cylia
- 2002 : Là où tu rêves - Jenifer
- 2002 : Les diamants sont solitaires - Natasha St-Pier
- 2003 : J'avais quelqu'un, Quand aimer ne suffit pas - Natasha St-Pier
- 2003 : Je regarde là-haut - Thierry Amiel
- 2003 : Jure-moi, Être une femme - Nolwenn Leroy
- 2003 : Tant que tu vis - Solidarité inondations
- 2003 : Tu pourras dire - Patricia Kaas
- 2004 : Grandir c'est te dire que je t'aime - Natasha St-Pier
- 2004 : Tu m'as donné - Laetizia
- 2005 : Tant que tu es - Daniel Lévi
- 2006 : Je peux tout quitter - Natasha St-Pier
- 2006 : J'irai chanter - Nouvelle Star
- 2008 : Tu pourras dire - Tina Arena
- 2008 : Des funambules - Murray Head
- 2010 : La vie n'attend pas - Myriam Abel
- 2012 : Peut-être - Bruno Pelletier
- 2012 : Te revoir - George Perris
- 2013 : Ça me suffira, L'amour à mort, Après la passion - Lisa Angell

== Musicals ==
- 1996 : Les sales gossesby Francis Lai
- 2009 : Zorro by Stephen Clark, adaptation by Éric Taraud and Marie-Jo Zarb, dir Christopher Renshaw, music Gipsy Kings - Folies Bergère
- 2011 : 80 jours : Un pari est un pari by Marie-Jo Zarb and Moria Némo - Zénith d'Orléans
- 2013-2014 : Pinocchio, le spectacle musical by Marie-Jo Zarb and Moria Némo - Théâtre de Paris, tournée
- 2014 : Aladin, le spectacle musical by David Rozen and Marie-Jo Zarb - Zénith d'Orléans

== Filmography ==
- 2002 : The Biggest Fan de Michael Criscione

== Award nominations ==
- 2014 : Prix de la création musicale originale pour un spectacle : Couper les liens, written with Stéphanie Mounier, from Pinocchio, le spectacle musical
