= Vous =

Vous is the plural form of "you" (also used as "polite" singular) in the French language.

Vous may refer to:

- "Vous" (song), debut solo single of French singer Merwan Rim
- Vous Island, a small Greek island
