= Kamel Ouali =

French-Algerian choreographer (born 1971)

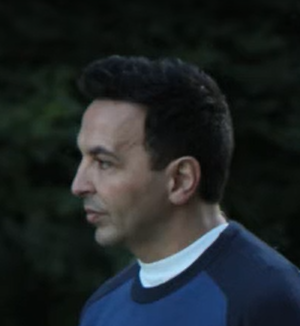
- Born: December 15, 1971 (age 53); Paris

Kamel Ouali (born 15 December 1971) is a French-Algerian choreographer.

== Biography ==
Kamel Ouali was born in Paris. He is from an Algerian Kabyle family of twelve children.

In 1989, he was spotted by Angela Lorente of TF1 and by Cédric Naimi. He appeared in 1989 in JOKER Promotion and in "French Kiss" (Happy Music/Sony) and in 1990 joined the Latino Party group accompanying Sylvie Vartan in her shows at Palais des Sports in Paris in January and February 1991.

Kamel Ouali also appeared on very high-profile music videos, notably in Cheb Khaled's "Chebba" (1993) and in Takfarinas hit "Zaama Zaama".

He is a dance teacher at the Dance Academy of Paris and at the Conservatories of La Courneuve and Saint Denis.

He took part in some French musicals like Les Dix Commandements (French 2000 production of The Ten Commandments) as choreographer of the show and in Autant en Emporte le Vent (French Gerard Presgurvic 2003 adaptation of Margaret Mitchell's novel Gone with the Wind) with staging and choreography by Ouali.

In September 2005 he created his own debut musical, produced by Dove Attia and Albert Cohen, Le Roi Soleil (The Sun King). The same year, he was the choreographer of Dances with Robots for the French theme park Futuroscope. The show opened on 5 April 2006.

In 2009 he worked on the musical Cléopâtre, la dernière reine d'Égypte (Cleopatra, Last Queen of Egypt). with lead role by Sofia Essaïdi. The same year, he choreographed Pastorale that played at Théâtre du Châtelet, an opera featuring the vocals of Star Academy and Nouvelle Star.

His own second musical comedy was the dance-oriented Dracula – L'amour plus fort que la mort that ran from 30 September 2011 to January 1, 2012 at Palais des Sports de Paris with a free adaptation of a book by Bram Stoker. It was considered a first as it portrayed the two lead characters Dracula and Mina in non-singing and uniquely dancing roles.

In 2019, he is the choreographer of Paradis Latin's new revue, "L'Oiseau Paradis" with Iris Mittenaere, Miss Universe 2016 as the revue's vedette (cabaret).

== In popular culture ==
- In 2001 he started to work as a dance teacher on the French TV show Star Academy, which gained him great popularity among teenagers and young adults. He continued with the show until 2008.
- In 2004, he choreographed two Eurovision Song Contest, the French song "À chaque pas" that was performed by Jonatan Cerrada and the Russian song "Believe Me" performed by Yulia Savicheva.
- In July 2009, he was the artistic director, choreographer and production of the opening ceremonies of the 2nd Pan African Festival that was held in the Algerian capital Algiers.
- From 2015 to 2017, he served as a judge on La France a un incroyable talent, the French version of the Got Talent franchise.
