= Autant en emporte le vent =

French musical version of Gone With the Wind

- Music: Gerard Presgurvic
- Lyrics: Gerard Presgurvic
- Book: Gone with the Wind by Margaret Mitchell
- Productions: 2003 Paris; 2015 Quebec; 2018 Seoul; 2018 China national tour

Autant en emporte le vent is a French musical adaptation of the 1936 Margaret Mitchell novel Gone with the Wind produced by Dove Attia and Albert Cohen in 2003, with music and lyrics by Gérard Presgurvic and staging and choreography by Kamel Ouali. The production is said to be a "musical spectacular" that gives "the black characters greater voice, in song and dance, [to express] their desire for freedom."

The debut performance was at Palais des Sports de Paris on 30 September 2003. After three months daily performances in Paris, the show moved to tour other major cities in France, Belgium, and Switzerland. The final show was in Nîmes arena on 11 July 2004.

== Personnel ==
- Production: Dove Attia and Albert Cohen
- Vocal direction: Richard Cross assisted by Nathalie Dupuis
- Staging and choreography: Kamel Ouali
- Gérard Presgurvic – Music, lyrics, narrator

=== Singers ===
- Laura Presgurvic – Scarlett O'Hara
- Vincent Niclo – Rhett Butler
- Sophie Delmas – Belle Watling
- Arié Itah – Gérald O'Hara
- Sandra Léane – Mélanie Hamilton Wiles
- Dominique Magloire – Mama
- Cyril Niccolaï – Ashley Wilkes
- Joël O'Cangha – Le chef des esclaves

=== Dancers / actors ===
- Georgette Kala Lobé – Prissy
- Marjorie Hannoteau – Ellen Robillard O'Hara, mother of Scarlett, Suellen and Carreen
- Delphine Attal – Suellen O'Hara, first sister of Scarlett and Bonnie Blue
- Hélène Buannic – Carreen O'Hara, second sister of Scarlett
- France Hervé – India Wilkes (in Paris productions)
- Marjorie Ascione – India Wilkes (during tour in other venues)
- Valentin Vossenat – Charles Hamilton, first husband of Scarlett
- David Decarme – Frank Kennedy, second husband of Scarlett (in Paris productions)
- Allal Mouradoudi – Frank Kennedy, second husband of Scarlett (during tour in other venues)
- Massimiliano Belsito – prison guard
- Philippe Mésia – prison guard

=== Alternative actors ===
- Virginie Duez – Scarlett O'Hara
- Jerome Rouzier – Rhett Buttler and Ashley Wilkes
- Marie Angèle Yoldi – Mama
- Didier Ayat – Gerald O'Hara
- Claire Cappelletti – Mélanie Hamilton Wilkes
- Lydia Dejugnac – Belle Watling
- Marc Beaujour – Chief of the slaves
- Cathy Ematchoua – Prissy
- Béatrice Buffin – Ellen Robillard O'Hara
- Alexandra Lemoine – Suellen O'Hara
- Jessica Sakalof – Careen O'Hara
- Jérôme Couchart – Charles Hamilton

=== Dancers ===
Professional dancers: Marjorie Ascione, Delphine Attal, Massimilio Belsito, Hacine Brahimi, Hélène Buannic, Béatrice Buffin, Emilie Capel, Jérôme Couchart, David Decarme, Fabien Hannot, Marjorie Hannoteaux, France Hervé, Georgette Louison Kala Lobe, Malik Lenost, Joakim Lorca, Philipe Mésia, Laurence Perez, Carl Portal, Sébastion Fjedj, Salem Sohibi et Valentin Vossenat.

Training dancers: Carlos Da Silva, Caty Ematchoua, Khalid Ghajji, Djad Hassane, Oswald Jean, Nestor Kouame, Fabrice Labrana, Alexandra Lemoine, Alexandre Martin, Mélanie Moniez, Catia Mota Da Cruz, Allal Mouradoudi, Jessica Sakalof, Sonia Tajouri et Nadine Timas.

=== Voices ===
- Isabelle Ferron – voice of Ketty Scarlett
- Frederic Charter – voice of a Yankee
- Tom Ross – voice of a Southerner
- Gérard Presgurvic – Narrator

== Songs ==
1. "Le bien contre le mal" – by the Yankees and the Southerners
2. "Seule" – by Scarlett O'Hara
3. "Bonbon rose" – by Mélanie Hamilton and Ashley Wilkes
4. "Nous ne sommes pas" – by Scarlett O'Hara
5. "Lâche" – by Rhett Butler and Gérald O'Hara
6. "Gâtée" – by Ashley Wilkes
7. "Ma terre" – by Gérald O'Hara
8. "Être noir" – by the Chief of the Slaves and by Mama
9. "Vous dites" – by Scarlett O'Hara and Rhett Butler
10. "Elle" – by Rhett Butler
11. "Si ce vent m'emporte" – by Mélanie Hamilton
12. "Putain" – by Belle Watling
13. "Je rentre maman" – by Scarlett O'Hara
14. "Je jure" – by Scarlett O'Hara
15. "J'ai tous perdu" – by Gérald O'Hara
16. "Tous les hommes" – by Chief of the Slaves
17. "Scarlett" – by Ashley Wilkes
18. "Ma vie coule" – by Scarlett O'Hara
19. "Mentir" – by Rhett Butler
20. "Marions nous" – by Belle Watling
21. "Que savez-vous de l'amour" – by Scarlett O'Hara and Mélanie Hamilton
22. "Que veulent les femmes" – by Rhett Butler
23. "Mélopée" – by Mama
24. "Morte" – by Ashley Wilkes
25. "Je vous aimais" – by Rhett Butler and Scarlett O'Hara
26. "Sourd" – by Mama, Rhett Butler, Scarlett O'Hara and the group
27. "Libres" – by Scarlett O'Hara, Rhett Butler and the group

== Album ==
The album contains the following tracks:

- "Le bien contre le mal"
- "Libres"
- "Elle"
- "Être Noir"
- "Si le vent m'emporte"
- "Seule"
- "Ma terre"
- "Tous les hommes"
- "Scarlett O'Hara"
- "Putain"
- "Ma vie coule"
- "Nous ne sommes pas"

== Singles ==
- "Tous les hommes"
- "Libres"
- "Ma vie coule"
- "Nous ne sommes pas"
- "Être Noir"

Autant en emporte le vent
