= 1789: Les Amants de la Bastille =

2012 musical by Dove Attia and François Chouquet

1789
- Les Amants de la Bastille
- Music: Dove Attia; Laurent Delort; Louis Delort; Rod Janois; Jean-Pierre Pilot; Benoit Poher; William Rousseau; Olivier Schultheis
- Lyrics: Dove Attia; Vincent Baguian
- Book: Dove Attia; François Chouquet
- Setting: France, 25 July, 1788–14 July, 1789
- Productions: 2012 Palais des Sports de Paris

1789: Les Amants de la Bastille (1789: Lovers of the Bastille) is a French stage musical with music by Dove Attia, Laurent Delort, Louis Delort, Rod Janois, Jean-Pierre Pilot, Benoit Poher, William Rousseau and Olivier Schultheis as well as lyrics by Attia and Vincent Baguian and a book by Attia and François Chouquet. It had its debut on 10 October 2012 at Palais des Sports de Paris. An accompanying double CD album was also successful in the French SNEP charts.

It has had productions in Japan, from both the Takarazuka Revue and Toho.

== Synopsis ==
=== Act 1 ===
In the summer of July 25, 1788, French King Louis XVI through Count Lazare de Peyrols issues a decree to the peasants of a village; that anyone who is unable to pay their taxes will be executed and have their lands confiscated. Among the accused and arrested, is the father of Ronan Mazurier and his younger sister, Solène. This enrages Ronan and the other peasants who refuse to comply, due to already being poverty stricken because of the taxes (Prélude, Prelude). A scuffle between the peasants and the soldiers ensues, and Ronan’s father is shot and killed amidst the melee. Now deprived of everything, Ronan and Solène decide to travel to Paris as Ronan vows to avenge their father’s death by revolting against the King (Le Cri de ma Naissance, The Cry of my Birth).

At the Palais de Versailles, Louis XVI and his wife, Marie Antoinette of Austria ravish in their luxurious lifestyle (Je mise tout, I Bet Everything). The King is visited by his financial minister, Jacques Necker who informs him that his recent decree of increasing the taxes is causing a burden on the people in the lower-class of France which could result in a revolution. His warning is dismissed. Meanwhile, Marie Antoinette is secretly informed by her friend, the Duchesse of Polignac that her lover, Count Axel von Fersen is in Paris and has arranged a secret rendezvous. Duchess Polignac entrusts the safety of the queen to Louis Joseph’s governess, Olympe du Puget. Unbeknownst to the queen, her brother-in-law Count D’Artois has his henchman Ramard and his snitches to spy on her.

Six months later, Ronan has been working as a printer for Jean Paul Marat and is part of the revolutionary group. His associate Camille Desmoulins introduces him to womaniser Georges Jacques Danton and street urchin Charlotte who mock the King and the royals (Au Palais-Royal, At the Palais-Royal). When Danton introduces them to his latest lady-lover, a horrified Ronan instantly recognises her as Solène. Solène chastises Ronan for being ignorant. While he was too absorbed with the revolutionary influence, she had to resort to prostitution in order to survive. The siblings quarrel and they go separate ways (La Nuit M’appelle, The Night Calls to Me). Later that evening, Marie Antoinette and Olympe are led to the rendezvous point by Charlotte, who acts as Olympe’s informant. Count Fersen tells the queen that tonight is the last time they are to see each other, but their meeting is quickly cut short by Ronan who yells at the group for disturbing his sleep. Marie Antoinette narrowly escapes unnoticed with Olympe and Charlotte’s help, and Olympe accuses Ronan of assault. Ramard and his snitches (who happened to be spying from afar) arrests Ronan for the false charges, and also after finding one of the revolutionary pamphlets he printed in his pockets.

Ronan is taken to the Bastille prison where he is tortured, imprisoned and sentenced to death (Maniaque, Maniac). At the Palais de Versailles, Olympe begins to regret her accusations against Ronan. She begs Count D’Artois to exonerate him by confessing to her part in the rendezvous between Count Fersen and the queen which is refused. Olympe then turns to her father, a lieutenant at Bastille. He refuses to help her free Ronan, prompting her to steal the keys and venture into the prison cells, just as Ramard and his snitches arrive to transfer Ronan to another prison. Olympe manages to find Ronan and she frees him from his cell. The pair escape via the sewers but are separated. All alone, Olympe begins questioning her newfound interest in Ronan (La Sentence, The Sentence (In the second version of the musical, the song is replaced with Tomber dans ses Yeux, Falling in Their Eyes)).

Ronan resumes his work with Marat and continues to print out revolutionary pamphlets with Desmoulins, Danton and Maximilien de Robespierre. A quarrel ensues between Ronan and Robspierre about the revolutionary ideals, but it is quickly defused by Danton who encourages the men to represent the revolution with respect to one another no matter the class (Hey ha). The group is eventually forced to flee the workshop when Ramard and his henchmen arrive, searching for Ronan. During his escape, Ronan runs into Charlotte who brings him to meet Olympe, though he is forbidden from seeing her. Olympe urges Ronan to flee Paris before hurrying away, but he refuses. Desperate to see Olympe, he begs Charlotte to tell him where he could find her. She tells him that Olympe is a governess to Marie Antoinette’s children, and that she will be attending the funeral of Louis Joseph at Saint-Denis the next day.

At Saint-Denis, Ronan finds Olympe, and the pair profess their love for one another (La guerre pour se plaire, War to Please Each Other). Meanwhile, Louis XVI is pressured by Count D’Artois to sign a treaty that will prohibit the deputies of the Third Estate to meet in the Room of Royal Entertainment. On the streets of Paris, Ronan, his friends and the people of Paris prepare to revolt against the royals, uncertain of their future (La Rue nous Appartient, The Street Belongs to Us).

=== Act 2 ===
In the spring of 1789, the revolutionaries continue with their plan to revolt against Louis XVI (La Rue nous Appartient, The Street Belongs to Us (reprise) / A quoi to danses?, What are you Dancing for?). Meanwhile, Olympe has a nightmare where she has a prophetic dream of Ronan being shot and killed at the Bastille while being taunted by Ramard who has been lusting after her (Je Suis un Dieu, I am a God). Fearing for Ronan’s life, Olympe realizes how different her, and his ideals of the world are and orders him to stay away from her despite their love for each other.

Famine continues to drastically increase, prompting the women of Paris including Solène to revolt (Je Veux le Monde, I Want the World). At the Palais de Versailles, Louis XVI is pressured on how to handle the ongoing unrest. He permits Count Peyrols to bring order to the people through violence, prompting Necker to voluntary resign as his financial minister. Meanwhile, Ronan asks Charlotte to help him tell Olympe that he loves her as he and the revolutionaries prepare for their revolt (Ca Ira mon Amour, It’ll be fine my love). Count Peyrols also prepares to fight against the revolutionaries, vowing his allegiance with the King (Nous ne Sommes, We Are Not). Charlotte sneaks into the Palais of Versailles where she finds Olympe. She passes Ronan’s message onto her, but Olympe insists that her place is with the royals. Ramard is killed by Count D’Artois for his constant failures.

In her room, Marie Antoinette refuses to accompany Duchess Polignac to leave Versailles and bids her farewell. Now alone with Olympe, the two women realize how similar they are. The queen then relieves Olympe from her duties by encouraging her to go to Ronan while quietly accepting her impending doom (Je Vous rend mon Ame, I Give You Back my Soul). Ronan and Olympe come to terms with their differences, but they still yearn for each other (Tomber dans ses Yeux, Falling in Their Eyes). While advancing to Bastille, Ronan vows to fulfil his vengeance on his father’s death (Sur ma peau, On my skin (extended version)).

The revolutionaries successfully storm the Bastille and seize control of the fortress, but Olympe’s prophetic dream comes true when Ronan is fatally shot and wounded. Olympe arrives not too long after Ronan is shot, and he dies in her arms (In the second version of the musical, Olympe takes the bullet that was meant for Ronan and dies in his arms). Following the aftermath, the revolutionaries declare equality among the classes and their country be ruled without a monarch (Fixe, Fixed).

Finale: The cast sings Pour La Peine (For Pain).

== Performances ==
As a pre-launch, the musical was performed on 29 September 2012.

The main role of Ronan had been entrusted initially to Matthieu Carnot. When Carnot suffered from vocal cord problems and had to undergo an operation, his role was given to Louis Delort, a finalist in France's The Voice: la plus belle voix competition. Carnot ended up with a lesser role as Lazare, Count of Peyrol.

Sébastien Agius, the winner of the inaugural season of X Factor in France in 2009, plays the role of Maximilien de Robespierre.

== Personnel ==
- Concept/Book: Dove Attia and François Chouquet
- Words/Lyrics: Dove Attia and Vincent Baguian
- Music: Dove Attia, Laurent Delort, Louis Delort, Rod Janois, Jean-Pierre Pilot, Benoit Poher, William Rousseau, Olivier Schultheis
- Staging and choreography: Giuliano Peparini
- Production: Dove Attia and Albert Cohen
- Casting: Bruno Berberes
- Costumes: Frédéric Olivier
- Hairdressing: Sébastien Quinet
- Lights: Xavier Lauwers
- Images: Patrick Neys

Singers

- Louis Delort - Ronan Mazurier, peasant revolutionary and lover of Bastille
- Camille Lou - Olympe du Puget, assistant governess to royal kids, lover of Bastille
- Rod Janois - Camille Desmoulins, lawyer, journalist and politician, "writer of the revolution"
- Roxane Le Texier / Emmanuelle Bouaziz - Marie Antoinette of Austria, Queen of France
- Sébastien Agius : Maximilien de Robespierre, lawyer and politician
- Nathalia - Solène Mazurier, Ronan's sister
- Mathieu Carnot - Lazare, count of Peyrol, a royal officer
- David Ban - Georges Jacques Danton, lawyer and head of the district of the Cordeliers
- Yamin Dib - Auguste Ramard, known as "Le Mouchard"
- Charlie Loiselier, Sonia Ben Ammar, Morgane Rouault, Elisa Bergomi and Eva Baranes

Actors

- Philippe Escande - Louis XVI, King of France
- Tatiana Matre - Yolande de Polignac, Duchess of Polignac and Marquise of Mancini, friend and confidant of Marie Antoinette
- Guillaume Delvingt - Jacques Necker, General Director of Finance
- Cyril Romoli - Charles X of France, Count of Artois, brother of Louis XVI

Dancers

- Benjamin Akl
- Mehdi Baki
- Jonathan Ber
- Guillaume Arvin Berod
- Noellie Bordelet
- Emmanuelle Bouaziz
- Camilla Brezzi
- Alessandra Cito
- Gianlorenzo De Donno
- Juliette Delatroche
- Gianluca Falvo
- Mikael Fau
- Michael Feigenbaum
- Tamara Fernando
- Yoan Grosjean
- Simon Gruszka
- Yann Hervé
- Alexandra Jezouin
- Véronique Lemonnier
- Olivier Mathieu
- Corentin Mazo
- Aurore Mettray
- Adrien Ouaki
- Loredana Perrichetti
- Geoffrey Ploquin
- Gaëtan Renaudin
- Arthur Rojo
- Emmanuelle Seguin Hernandez
- Jessie Toesca
- Jimmy Vairon
- Valentina Valenti
- Valentin Vossenat

== Discography ==
=== Initial release (2 April 2012) ===
1. "Pour la peine" (Rod Janois, Nathalia, Sébastien Agius, Roxane Le Texier, Matthieu Carnot and Camille Lou) - 3:19
2. "Hey ha" (Sébastien Agius) - 3:01
3. "Je veux le monde" (Nathalia) - 3:18
4. "Ça ira mon amour" (Rod Janois) - 3:41
5. "Le temps s'en va" (Matthieu Carnot and Camille Lou) - 2:52
6. "Fixe" (Rod Janois) - 3:02
7. "Je mise tout" (Roxane Le Texier) - 3:10
8. "La sentence" (Camille Lou) - 3:34
9. "Maniaque" (Matthieu Carnot) - 2:59
10. "La rue nous appartient" (Rod Janois and Matthieu Carnot) - 3:52
11. "A quoi tu danses?" (Sébastien Agius) - 2:36
12. "La nuit m'appelle" (Nathalia) - 3:15
13. "Le cri de ma naissance" (Nathalia) - 2:43
14. "Ça ira mon amour" (acoustic version) - 4:26

=== Full release (22 October 2012) ===
CD 1

1. "Prélude" (instrumental) - 1:24
2. "Le cri de ma naissance" (Nathalia) - 2:43
3. "Je mise tout" (Roxane Le Texier) - 3:10
4. "Au Palais royal / Les prostituées" (David Ban) - 3:27
5. "La nuit m'appelle" (Nathalia) - 3:15
6. "Tomber dans ses yeux" (Louis Delort and Camille Lou) - 2:48
7. "Maniaque" (Matthieu Carnot) - 2:59
8. "La sentence" (Camille Lou) - 3:34
9. "Hey ha" (Sébastien Agius) - 3:01
10. "La guerre pour se plaire / Le Dauphin" (Louis Delort and Camille Lou) - 5:25
11. "La rue nous appartient" (Rod Janois and Louis Delort) - 3:52

CD 2

1. "A quoi tu danses?" (Sébastien Agius) -
2. "Je suis un dieu / Le cauchemar" (Yamin Dib) -
3. "Je veux le monde" (Nathalia) -
4. "Ça ira mon amour" (Rod Janois) -
5. "Nous ne sommes" (Matthieu Carnot) -
6. "Je vous rends mon âme" (Roxane Le Texier) -
7. "Sur ma peau" (Louis Delort) -
8. "La prise de la Bastille" (instrumental) -
9. "Fixe / Les Droits des l'homme" (Rod Janois) -
10. "Pour la peine" (Rod Janois, Nathalia, Sébastien Agius, Roxane Le Texier, Matthieu Carnot and Camille Lou) - 3:19

Bonus tracks

1. "Ça ira mon amour" (acoustic version) - 3:43
2. "Je veux le monde" (acoustic version) - 2:55
3. "Pour un nouveau monde" (Sonia Ben Ammar and Charlie Loiselier) - 3:04
4. "Filles et femmes à la fois" (Nathalia, Camille Lou and Roxane Le Texier) - 3:02
5. "Allez viens (c'est bientôt la fin)" (Rod Janois, Louis Delort and Sébastien Agius) - 3:00

=== Albums ===
Year	Album	Peak positions			Certification
Year	Album	BEL Wa	FR	SWI	Certification
2012	1789: Les Amants de la Bastille	6	7	84	

=== Singles ===
"Ça ira mon amour," performed by Rod Janois, became the debut single from the show. A music video was released in October 2011. A collector's edition was made available on 2 January 2012. The follow-up single, "Pour la peine," was sung by the musical's ensemble and was released on 27 February 2012, and its music video was released on 2 March 2012. The music video for a third song, "Je veux le monde", performed by Nathalia, was made available in May 2012, followed by a fourth release, "Tomber dans ses yeux," performed by Louis Delort and Camille Lou.

Year	Single	Peak positions		Album
Year	Single	BEL Wa	FR	Album
2012	"Pour la peine"	21	36	1789: Les Amants de la Bastille
2012	"Je veux le monde" (1789, les amants de la Bastille / Nathalia)	–	103	1789: Les Amants de la Bastille
2012	"Tomber dans ses yeux" (1789, Les Amants de la Bastille / Louis Delort & Camille Lou)	–	38	1789: Les Amants de la Bastille
2013	"Sur ma peau" (1789, Les Amants de la Bastille)	–	193	1789: Les Amants de la Bastille

== DVD ==
A 2-DVD set of the December 18, 2012 performance was released on November 6, 2013 in France.
