= Gone with the Wind =

Gone with the Wind most often refers to:

- Gone with the Wind (novel), a 1936 novel by Margaret Mitchell
- Gone with the Wind (film), the 1939 adaptation of the novel

Gone with the Wind may also refer to:

== Music ==
- Gone with the Wind (album), a 1959 album by The Dave Brubeck Quartet
- "Gone with the Wind" (song), a popular song by Allie Wrubel and Herb Magidson released in 1937
- "Gone with the Wind", a song by Architects from the 2016 album All Our Gods Have Abandoned Us
- "Gone with the Wind", a song by Blackmore's Night from the 1999 album Under a Violet Moon
- "Gone with the Wind", a song by Robin Gibb from the 1985 album Walls Have Eyes
- "Gone with the Wind", a song by Techno Twins from the 1982 album Technostalgia
- "Gone with the Wind", a song by Vanessa Hudgens from the 2008 album Identified

== Theater ==
- Gone with the Wind (musical), a 2008 musical based on the novel
- Scarlett (musical), retitled Gone with the Wind for the 1972 London production
- Autant en emporte le vent, a 2003 French musical based on the novel

== Other uses ==
- "Gone with the Wind", a 1998 episode of Spin City
- "Gone with the Wind", an episode of The Cleveland Show season 1
