= Salut les copains (musical) =

Salut les copains, full title Salut les copains: Le Spectacle Musicale is a 2012 French musical comedy written by Pascal Forneri and directed and choreographed by Stéphane Jarny based on the yé-yé generation of music of the period exemplified by the French renowned radio program Salut les copains and the ensuing music magazine of the same title.

== Synopsis ==
In the 1960s, French youth are infatuated with the new yéyé trend of music. Catherine and Michel are in love with each other and what joins them is their love for Idole. The couple live their love affair through music stretching nearly a decade and considered the definitive period of French new pop culture.

== Cast ==
- Vincent Heden as The "Idole"
  - Replaced by Nuno Resende in same role
- Fanny Fourquez as Catherine
- Flo Malley as Michel
- Anaïs Delva as Annie
  - Replaced by Aurore Delplace in same role
- Gregory Deck as Jacques
- Marie Facundo as Nicole
- Alexandre Faitrouni as Pierre
- Laurent Paolini as Roger

Anaïs Delva in the role of Annie had to leave the French tour after the Lille shows, having been engaged in another musical called Les amants d'un jour where she took the role of Marilou. She was replaced by Aurore Delplace, an earlier candidate on the French reality television series The Voice, la plus belle voix in Team Louis Bertignac.

== Songs ==
- "Poupée de cire, poupée de son"
- "Retiens la nuit" (Michel)
- "Itsi bitsy"
- "Laisse tomber les filles"
- Jingle Salut les copains
- "Je vends des robes"
- "La plus belle pour aller danser"
- "Love Me, Please Love Me"
- "Mes parents n'aimaient que le classique"
- "(I Can't Get No) Satisfaction"
- "Les mauvais garcons"
- "Yesterday"
- "Il est mort le soleil"
- "Slc salut les copains"
- "Vous les copains"
- "Tous les garçons et les filles"
- "Le telefon"
- "My Generation"

== Personnel ==
- Stéphane Jarny - Mise en scène and Choreography
- Patricia Delon - Assistant mise en scène / Technical and artistic coordination
- Mehdi Kerkouch - Collaboration in choreography
- Pascal Forneri - Writer
- Agnès Boury - Dialogues and direction of actors
- Stéphane Laporte - Dialogues
- Nathalie Dupuy - Vocal coach
- Bruno Berberes - Casting
- Arnaud Ducret - Casting Comedy
- Vincent Heden - Vocal arrangements
- Chiquito - Musical artistic direction - Executive production
- David Berland - Musical direction and orchestrations
- Stéfanie Jarre - Decor - scenography
- Joséphine Gad - Assistant decor and scenography
- Elodie Chailloux - graphic conception
- Gwen Vinson – KI Studio - video
- Ateliers Jipanco - Construction of decor
- Gaumont Pathé Archives - Images from May 1968
- Ina - Image archives from ORTF (author: Christian Hourriez)
- Tommy Pascal - Montage of archive images
- vanessa Coquet - Costumes
- Cécilia Sebaoun - Costumes
- Régis Vigneron - Lighting
- Philippe Parmentier - Sound
- Antoine Wauquier - Hairstyle
- Aurellie Yvon - Assistant hairstyle
- Jocelyne Lemery - Make-up
