= Bosselshausen =

Bosselshausen Bosselshüse
- Commune
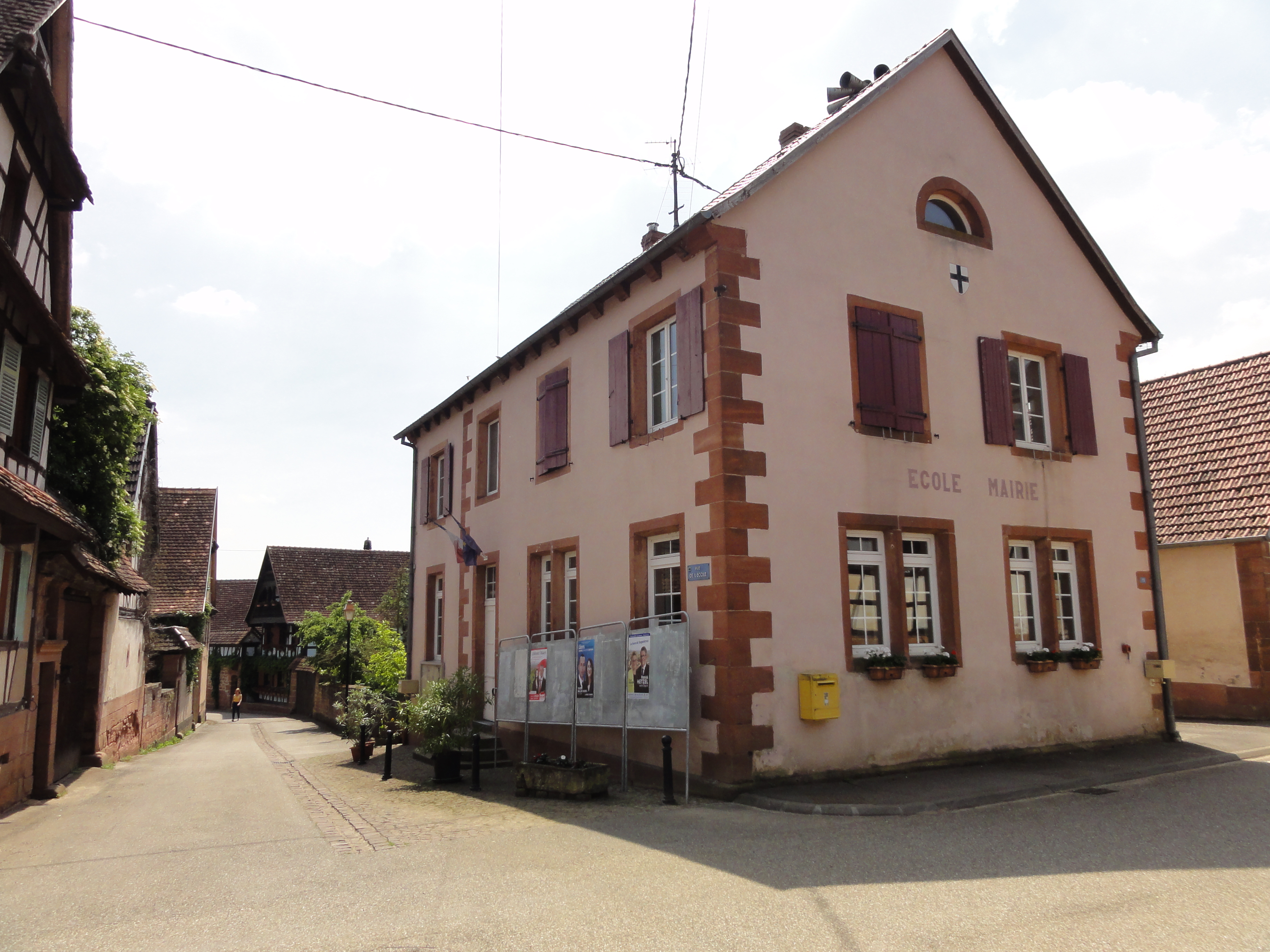
- The town hall in Bosselshausen

- Coat of arms
- Location of Bosselshausen
- Location within France Location within Grand Est
- Coordinates: 48°48′20″N 7°30′22″E
- Country: France
- Region: Grand Est
- Department: Bas-Rhin
- Arrondissement: Saverne
- Canton: Bouxwiller

Government
  - Mayor (2020–2026): Laurence Jost-Lienhard
- Area^{1}: 3.27 km^{2} (1.26 sq mi)
- Highest elevation: 241 m (791 ft)
- Lowest elevation: 179 m (587 ft)
- Population (2023): 180
  - Density: 55/km^{2} (140/sq mi)
- Time zone: UTC+01:00 (CET)
  - Summer (DST): UTC+02:00 (CEST)
- INSEE/Postal code: 67057 /67330
- ^{1} French Land Register data, which excludes lakes, ponds, glaciers > 1 km^{2} (0.386 sq mi or 247 acres) and river estuaries.

Bosselshausen is a commune in the Bas-Rhin department in Grand Est in north-eastern France.

In January, 2007, it split from the Kirrwiller commune after having merged with it in 1974.

== See also ==
- Communes of the Bas-Rhin department
