= Vanessa Cailhol =

French actress, dancer and singer

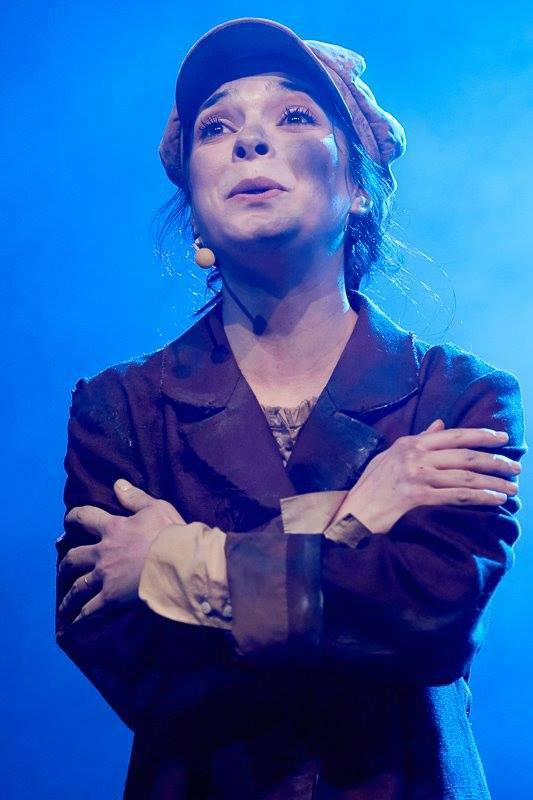
- Vanessa Cailhol in Les Misérables (2012)
- Born: France
- Occupation(s): Actress, singer, dancer
- Website: Official site

Vanessa Cailhol is a French actress, dancer and singer, born in Toulouse.

== Career ==
Born in Toulouse, Vanessa grew up in Aveyron, and her passion for dancing encouraged her to choose a secondary curriculum with a special emphasis on dance, in Rodez. In 2000; she gets into the Besso Ballet, the junior ballet company in Toulouse, then the ballet dancing at the Geneva Dance Center in Genève. After various shows and attracted by singing and acting, Vanessa joins the French “Academie Internationale de Comédie Musicale” in Paris and then, the Cours Florent.

For her first experience on stage, she played the part of Mowgli in The Jungle Book, and then took several parts one after the other, such as The Prince and the Pauper, Coups de foudre, Grease, Les Misérables, Peter Pan, Fiddler on the Roof... In 2010, she played Lisa, and Sophie’s understudy in the musical Mamma Mia!. In 2011 she joined the Cabaret (musical)'s troop at the Théâtre Marigny where she played Frenchie, and Claire Pérot’s understudy – the leading part of Sally Bowles.

In October 2013, and January 2014, she played the title role in Pinocchio, le spectacle musical in Paris.

== Charity contribution ==
Since 2011, she has patronized the association Coeurs en scène. In 2013, she played an active part in the single Un faux départ, with Les grandes voix des comédies musicales and, among others, Renaud Hantson, Mikelangelo Loconte, and Lââm.

== Ballet dancing ==
- 2004 : Giselle, La Fille mal gardée, Carmen – Ballet Junior Besso Amantico
- 2004–2005 : Pergolese – Ballet Junior Classique de Genève
- 2005 : Graines de sable – By Paolo Nocéra at Grand Casino de Genève
- 2005 : Paquita – Ballet Junior Classique de Genève
- 2006 : Dancers days, Partitas, La nuit de Noël – Compagnie Moves and Lines / Soliste
- 2006–2008 : Fluide, D'ici et d'ailleurs by Misook Seo – Festival d'Avignon, tour, Romania, Edinburgh International Festival, Café de la Danse
- 2007 : The Nutcracker – Compagnie Choryphée
- 2008 : Les noces de Jeannette by Victor Massé, dir by Patricia Samuel – Festival de Lamallous

== Theatre ==
- 2008 : Wayra et le sorcier de la grande montagne by Valentina Arce – Tour
- 2013–2014 : Tatrod'lachance by Amar Mostefaoui and Richard Taxy – Théâtre les Feux de la Rampe, Festival d'Avignon, tour

== Operetta ==
- 2011 : Andalousie by Raymond Vincy, dir by Carole Clin
- 2011 : 4 jours à Paris by Raymond Vincy and Albert Willemetz, dir by Frédéric L'Huillier
- 2011–2012 : La Route fleurie by Francis Lopez and Raymond Vincy, dir by Fabrice Lelièvre – Théâtre de Villeurbanne and dir by Pierre Sybil – Théâtre de Dole
- 2012 : Andalousie de Raymond Vincy, mes de Pierre Sybil – Aix-les-Bains
- 2013 : Luis Mariano/Francis Lopez de Fabrice Lelièvre – Palais des congrès de Paris – Aix-les-Bains
- 2013 : Le Chanteur de Mexico by Francis Lopez, dir by Pierre Sybil – Théâtre de Dole
- 2013 : 4 jours à Paris by Raymond Vincy and Albert Willemetz, dir by Emmanuel Marfolia – Théâtre lyrique de Saint-Marcel, Théâtre de Troyes
- 2013 : La Périchole by Jacques Offenbach, dir by Jean-Philippe Corre
- 2013–2014 : Violettes impériales by Vincent Scotto, dir by de Pierre Sybil – Théâtre d'Opérette de Lyon
- 2013–2014 : The White Horse Inn by Ralph Benatzky, dir by Jacques Duparc – Théâtre de Tourcoing, Bordeaux
- 2014 : Méditerranée by Raymond Vincy and Francis Lopez – Mons
- 2014 : La Belle de Cadix, mes Fabrice Lelièvre – Aix les Bains

== Musicals ==
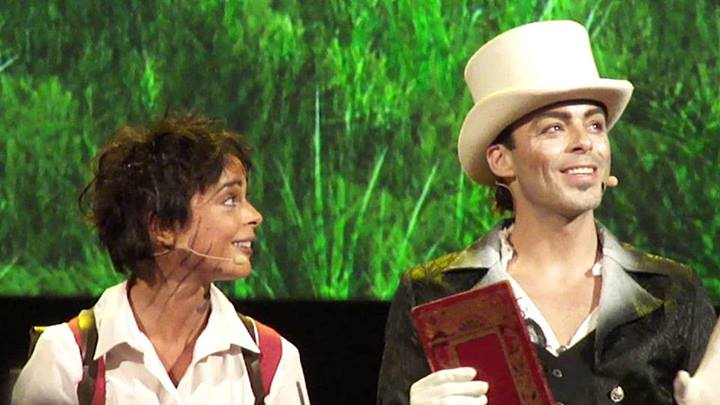
Vanessa Cailhol and Nuno Resende in Pinocchio (2013)

- 2007–2008 : The Jungle Book, dir by de Brice Tripart – Théâtre de Paris, tour
- 2008 : L'homme qui rit – Vingtième Théâtre
- 2008 : Le fabuleux voyage de la fée Mélodie by Stéphanie Marino, dir by Nicolas Devort – Tour
- 2008–2009 : The Prince and the Pauper – Théâtre Tallia, Théâtre Marsoulan, Le Trianon
- 2008–2010 : Grease by Jim Jacobs and Warren Casey, dir by Olivier Bénézech and Jeanne Deschaux – Théâtre Comédia, Palais des congrès de Paris
- 2009 : Les Misérables de Claude-Michel Schönberg, Alain Boublil and Jean-Marc Natel, dir by Gérard Demierre – Tour, Lausanne
- 2009 : Coups de foudre, dir by Jean-Baptiste Arnal – Vingtième Théâtre, Théâtre Musical Marsoulan
- 2009–2010 : Peter Pan, dir by Guy Grimbert – Théâtre des Variétés and tour
- 2010 : Fiddler on the Roof, dir by Jeanne Deschaux – Le Palace
- 2010–2011 : Mamma Mia! by Benny Andersson and Björn Ulvaeus, Phyllida Lloyd – Théâtre Mogador
- 2011–2012 : Cabaret (musical) by and dir by Sam Mendes and Rob Marshall – Théâtre Marigny, tour
- 2012 : La revanche d'une blonde – Le Palace
- 2012 : Les instants volés by Cyrille Garit and Stève Perrin, dir by Jean-Charles Mouveaux-Mayeur – Théâtre Michel
- 2012–2013 : Peter Pan – Guy Grimbert – Bobino
- 2012–2013 : La nuit de Noël by and dir by Virginie Bienaimée – Living Museum of the Horse at Chantilly
- 2013 : L'Hôtel des Roches Noires by Stéphane Corbin and Françoise Cadol, dir by Christophe Luthringer – Festival d'Avignon, tour
- 2013 : Christophe Colomb by Gérôme Gallo and Gérald Dellorta – Vingtième Théâtre
- 2013 : Le fabuleux voyage de la fée Mélodie by Stéphanie Marino, dir by Nicolas Devort – Tour
- 2013–2014 : Pinocchio, le spectacle musical by Marie-Jo Zarb and Moria Némo, dir by Marie-Jo Zarb – Théâtre de Paris, tour

== Filmography ==
- 2007 : Rêver c'est possible by Nils Tavernier, short
- 2012 : La nouvelle Blanche-Neige by Laurent Bénégui

== Discography ==
- 2011 : Le chemin, for the NGO Winds Peace Japan
- 2013 : Un faux départ, with the collective Les grandes voix des comédies musicales
- 2013 : La nuit de Noël :
  - Si j'étais une sorcière
  - La supplique des ailes
  - Le temps presse
  - Retour sur terre
- 2013 : Pinocchio, le spectacle musical
