= Les Dix Commandements (musical) =

2000 French-language musical comedy

- Cover of DVD release
- Music: Pascal Obispo
- Lyrics: Lionel Florence and Patrice Guirao
- Productions: Elie Chouraqui, Dove Attia and Albert Cohen at Palais des Sports de Paris in 2000

Les Dix Commandements (French pronunciation: [le di kɔmɑ̃dmɑ̃], lit. 'The Ten Commandments') is a French-language musical comedy written by Élie Chouraqui and Pascal Obispo that premiered in Paris in October 2000.

In 2022, the musical premiered in the English language with an American adaptation written and directed by David Serero (starring as Moses) in New York. The U.S. Cast Album Recording's first single, "The Maximum Pain," was released. For this production, David Serero was awarded for "Theatrical Excellence" by The Musical Theater Radio and was nominated for Best Director and Performer at the 2022 BroadwayWorld Awards.

The musical in two acts became the basis of similar musicals elsewhere, including Patrick Leonard's film The Ten Commandments: The Musical.

== Cast ==
Principal actors

- Pedro Alves (Aaron)
- Lisbet Guldbaek (Bithia)
- Daniel Lévi (Moses)
- Ginie Line (Nefertari)
- Ahmed Mouici (Ramsès)
- Nourith (Sephora)
- Pablo Villafranca (Joshua)
- Anne Warin (Yokébed)
- Yael Naim (Myriam)

Comedian

- Jocelyn Durvel (Séthi)

Alternative actors

- Joshaa: Moses
- Anath Benais: Nefertari and Séphora
- Patrice Carmona: Ramsés
- Emmanuel Dahl: Joshua and Aaron
- Delphine Elbe: Bithia, Yochébed and Myriam

New casting

- Merwan Rim (Ramsès)
- Joana (Séphora and Yochébed)
- Alexandra Lucci (Nefertari)
- Clarisse Lavanant (Sephora and Bithia)
- Fabian Richard (Joshua and Aaron)
- Anissa Stili (Myriam)
- Richard Ross (Moses)
- Chris Martin (Moses)

== Technical staff ==
- Direction: Elie Chouraqui
- Music: Pascal Obispo
- Texts: Lionel Florence and Patrice Guirao
- Choreography: Kamel Ouali
- Decor: Giantito Burchiellaro
- Costumes: Sonia Rykiel
- Production label: 7 ART
- Producers: Elie Chouraqui, Dove Attia and Albert Cohen
- Director of casting: Bruno Berberes

== Songs ==
Act 1

1. Introduction: Les prières du monde (Introduction: The Prayers of The World) (Moïse)
2. Le massacre (The Slaughter) (Orchestre)
3. Je laisse à l'abandon (I Let To Abandon) (Yokebed/Bithia)
4. Il s'appellera Moïse (He Will Be Called Moses) (Bithia)
5. Séthi et son Empire (Seti and His Empire) (Orchestre)
6. Le dilemme (The Dilemma) (Nefertari/Moïse/Ramses)
7. Désaccord (Disagreement)(Orchestre)
8. À chacun son rêve (Every Man has a dream) (Moïse/Ramses)
9. Le peuple Juif (The Jewish People) (Orchestre)
10. La peine maximum (The Maximum Pain) (Joshua/Aaron)
11. En cadence (Rhythmically) (Orchestre)
12. Je n'avais jamais prié (I Had Never Prayed) (Joshua/Moïse)
13. Le procès (The Trial) (Orchestra)
14. Sans lui (Without Him) (Nefertari/Ramses)
15. Oh Moïse (Oh Moses) (Yokebed/Aaron/Myriam/Bithia)
16. La rencontre (The Encounter) (Orchestra)
17. Il est celui que je voulais (He is The One I Wanted) (Sephora)

Act 2

1. Celui qui va/Le Buisson Ardent (Whoever Goes/The Burning Bush) (Moïse)
2. Mais tu t’en vas (But You leave) (Sephora/Nefertari/Myriam/Bithia/)
3. C’est ma volonté (It's My Will) (Ramses/Myriam)
4. Laisse mon peuple s’en aller (Let My People Go) (Yokebed/Moise/Hebrews)
5. À chacun son glaive (Every Man Has His Sword) (Ramses/Moïse)
6. Les dix plaies (The Ten Plagues) (Orchestra)
7. L’inacceptable (The Unacceptable) (Nefertari)
8. L.I.B.R.E. (Liberty) (Myriam/Hebrews)
9. Devant la mer (Before The Sea) (Aaron)
10. Mon frère (My Brother) (Ramses/Moïse)
11. Une raison d’espérer (A Reason To Hope) (Sephora)
12. Le veau d’or (The Golden Calf) (Orchestra)
13. Les dix commandements (The Ten Commandments) (Moïse/Hebrews)
14. L'envie d'aimer/Final (The Desire To Love) (Full Cast)

== Discography ==
- L'intégral (CD double album - released 18 April 2001)

CD1

1. Je Laisse à L'abandon
2. Il S'appellera Moïse
3. Le Dilemme
4. À Chacun Son Rêve
5. La Peine Maximum
6. Je N'avais Jamais Prié
7. Sans Lui
8. Oh Moïse
9. Il Est Celui Que Je Voulais

CD2

1. Celui Qui Va
2. Mais Tu T'en Vas
3. C'est Ma Volonté
4. Laisse Mon Peuple S'en Aller
5. À Chacun Son Glaive
6. L'inacceptable
7. L.i.b.r.e.
8. Devant La Mer
9. Mon Frère
10. Une Raison D'espérer
- Simple album (1 CD)

Professional ratings
Review scores
| Source | Rating |
|---|---|
| AllMusic | 3/5 stars |

1. Je laisse à l'abandon
2. Il s'appellera Moïse
3. Le dilemme
4. À chacun son rêve
5. La peine maximum
6. Oh Moïse
7. Il est celui que je voulais
8. Mais tu t'en vas
9. Laisse mon peuple s'en aller
10. L-I-B-R-E
11. Devant La Mer
12. Mon frère
13. Les dix commandements
14. L'envie d'aimer

Technical staff

- Christophe Deschamps - drums
- Laurent Vernerey - bass
- Ian Inverd & Christophe Voisin - programming and keyboards
- Pierre Jaconelli - guitar
- Denis Benarrosch - percussions
- Jean-Yves d'Angelo - piano
- Nick Ingman, David Sinclair Whitaker & Olivier Schultheis - arrangements
- Les Archets de Paris et de France - orchestra
