= Spartacus le Gladiateur =

Spartacus le Gladiateur (meaning Spartacus the Gladiator in French) is a musical Elie Chouraqui and Maxime Le Forestier based on the story of Spartacus. The musical extravaganza premiered at the Palais des Sports in Paris in 2004.

It was also marketed as a DVD.

== Music (songs and instrumentals) ==
Act I

1. "Découverte de la mine" (instrumental)
2. "Père, où es-tu?" (the child)
3. "Tenir" (Spartacus)
4. "Arrivée de Batiatus" (instrumental)
5. "Je veux des hommes" (Batiatus)
6. "La nuit" (Spartacus & Calicia)
7. "Personne ne sait" (Spartacus, David, Draba and a gladiator)
8. "De cuir, de sueur, de sang" (Crassus & Héléna)
9. "Sommeil" (Calicia)
10. "Arrivée dans l'arène & premier combat" (instrumental)
11. "Je ne te tuerai pas mon frère" (Draba)
12. "Papillon" (instrumental)
13. "Plus jamais" (Spartacus)
14. "Révolte des gladiateurs" (instrumental)
15. "Si un jour la vie est belle" (Calicia)

Act II

1. "Découverte du Sénat" (instrumental)
2. "Je dormais" (Batiatus)
3. "Va dire à Rome" (Spartacus)
4. "L'ordre & la loi" (Crassus)
5. "Tu n'es plus seul" (Calicia)
6. "Arrivée des légions romaines" (instrumental)
7. "En quoi crois-tu, petit père?" (David & Spartacus)
8. "Une heure avant l'aube" (Héléna)
9. "La bataille" (instrumental)
10. "Je n'aime pas punir" (Crassus)
11. "Il m'a dit" (David)
12. "Je n'aurai connu qu'un homme" (Calicia)
13. "Les larmes de l'enfant" (the child)
14. "Je reviendrai" (the group)
