= The Liars (film) =

1996 film

- Directed by: Élie Chouraqui
- Written by: Antoine Lacomblez; Élie Chouraqui
- Produced by: Robert Benmussa
- Starring: Jean-Hugues Anglade
- Cinematography: François Catonné
- Release date: 6 March 1996
- Running time: 108 minutes
- Country: France
- Language: French
- Box office: $590.000

The Liars (French: Les menteurs) is a 1996 French drama film directed by Élie Chouraqui. It was entered into the 46th Berlin International Film Festival.

== Cast ==
- Jean-Hugues Anglade as Zac
- Valeria Bruni Tedeschi as Daisy
- Lorraine Bracco as Helene Miller
- Sami Frey as Marcus Dourmer
- Dominique Besnehard as the Casting Director
- Sophie Mounicot
- Bernard Farcy
