= Émilie Jolie =

Musical by Philippe Chatel

Émilie Jolie is a French children's musical by Philippe Chatel and arranged by Jean-Louis Bucchi. It later became a film involving Georges Brassens, Henri Salvador, Julien Clerc, Alain Souchon, Laurent Voulzy, Louis Chedid, Françoise Hardy and Eddy Mitchell in the first rendition and Johnny Hallyday, Alain Bashung, Jacques Dutronc, Maurane, Florent Pagny, Axelle Red and Etienne Daho.

The musical has had two adaptations: a 1980 live-action TV movie (except the ostrich was performed by Diane Dufresne) and a 2011 animated adaptation.

Philip Chatel's "comédie musicale" Émilie Jolie returned in its third rendition in Paris (and later in several French towns) from October 20, 2017, to April 22, 2018, with artists such as Gloria - The Voice Kids & Kids United and Johanna Serrano.

Additionally, members of the cast of Emilie Jolie created a song called "chanel n" with the creator's name as "lluvia/SLK" as a tracker music genre in tribute to Emilie Jolie.

== Summary ==
The narrator starts by telling the story of a goldfish, but suddenly realises that he is here to instead tell the story of Émilie Jolie.

While her parents were out, the young Émilie is lying alone in her bed and frightened by the darkness. She finds a picture book on the floor and immerses herself in it. The first song, "Song of the Young Girl in the Empty Bedroom" starts.

After the song, Émilie finds herself in a landscape where everything was blue, even the sun. There, she crosses paths with the Blue Rabbits' Gathering, who were facing a problem; each time when it rains, they catch a cold. When they start sneezing, they become red.

On the following page, Émilie arrives in front of a giant tree with many birds and one of the birds comes to her. After introducing herself, Émilie asks the bird to take her with it to the sky. The bird answers that there are still many things for her to discover on earth, leading into the song, "Song of Émilie and the Great Bird."

On the next page, Émilie meets an ostrich who is longing to be a cabaret star on Broadway. And so the ostrich sings "Ostrich's Song."

The little girl then enters into a dark and creepy page, the page of the witch. The witch feels doomed because of her situation where she appears as a mean person to all that she meets, but in fact, she is only waiting for a 'prince charming' to love and save her. This leads into the song, "Song of the Witch." Émilie promises the witch that she will look for the witch's 'prince charming' throughout the book, with the help of the narrator.

Émilie visits the page where she meets a ballet of umbrella ribs. The umbrella ribs' song starts playing. She is then struck by an idea. She calls the blue rabbits and asks them to come to the page she is in. After they arrive, she announces that she has found a way for them not becoming red. They just need to hold onto the umbrellas when it rains. The song "The Blue Rabbits' Gathering Song" is sung again.

On the next page, Emily meets a hedgehog who is sad because nobody wants to stroke him due to his quills. Émilie, like the "book's fairy", decides to caress him to make him happy, leading into "Hedgehog's Song."

She continues on her way through the pages seeking the 'prince charming' as "Clockwork Song" is played (which was added in the 1997 production). She meets an extraterrestrial who is crazy about the music in his spaceship ("Extraterrestrial's Song"); a pebble abandoned by Tom Thumb, which felt lonely in the forest and she picks it up so that it goes with her in her pocket ("Pebble's Song"); a cock and a donkey that have to share the book's words ("Cock and Donkey's Song"); a little flower who doesn't want to wilt under the leaves so she picks it up to put in her hair ("Sad Little Flower's Song") – this song isn't in the first version. She meets a nasty wolf abused by Granny ("Wolf's Song"). She comforts it and reconciles it with Granny. Finally, a raccoon dreams of being coloured ("Dreaming Raccoon Song") so she gives it the blue of her eyes, the colour of her blond hair and the pink of her cheeks.

When Émilie turns the page, she ends up in a page where everything is white and with large letters "E N D." She has arrived at the end of the book, leading into "Beginning of The End Song."

Émilie hasn't found the witch's 'prince charming' and refuses to end the story until she does. The narrator decides to turn himself into prince charming. The narrator knows he is not perfect as he has no armour and neither does he ride a white horse, but this is not important to the witch. This leads to "Novice Prince Charming's Song."

With all of the fairy tale's characters watching, the witch turns into a princess, and the story ends. Émilie falls asleep in her bed, rocked by the narrator who tells her that her new friends will always be in the picture book when she needs them. The "Final Song" is then sung.
