= François Valéry =

French singer-songwriter and composer (born 1954)

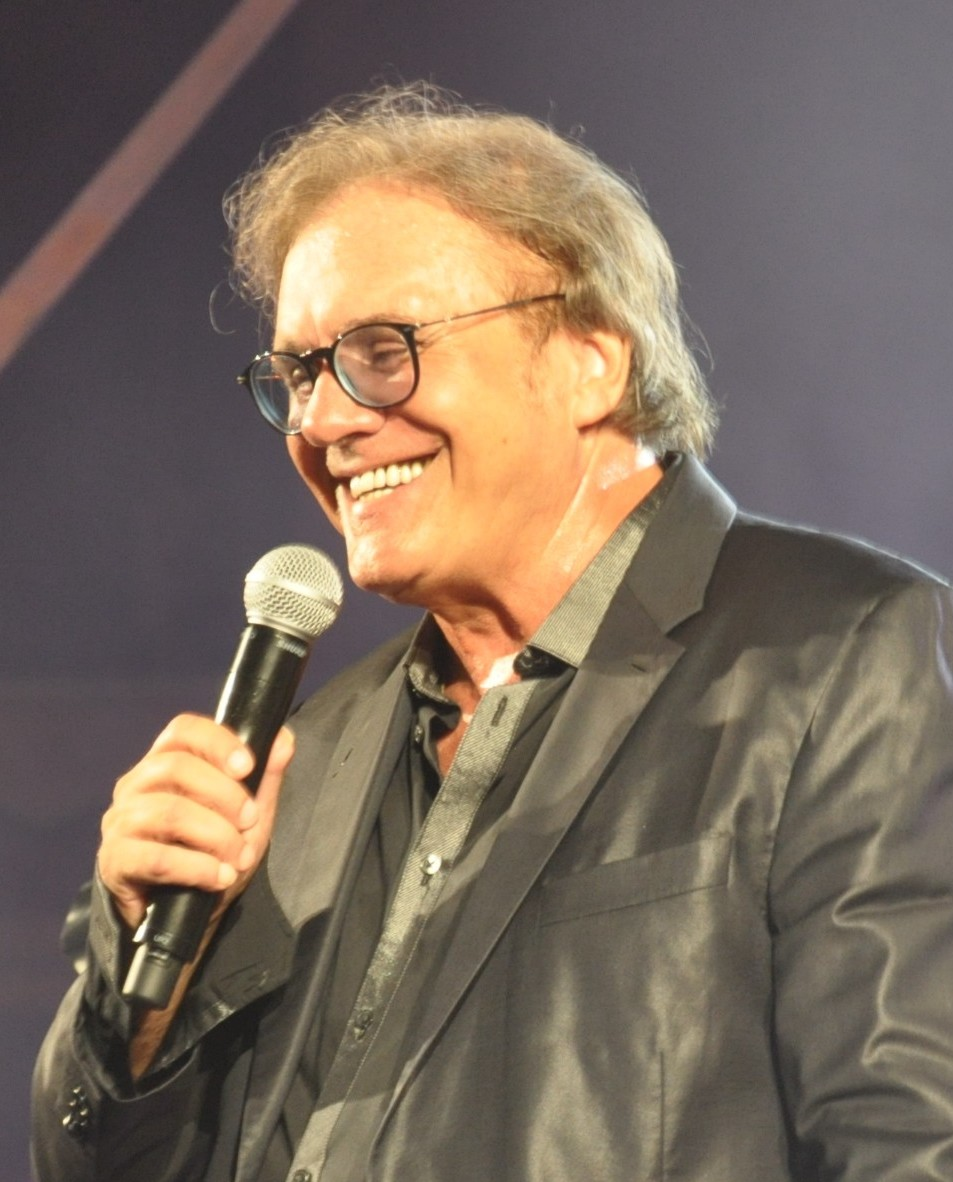
- Valéry performing in Cannes in 2019

Background information
- Born: Jean-Louis Mougeot; 4 August 1954 (age 72)
- Origin: Oran, French Algeria
- Genres: Pop
- Occupations: Singer, songwriter, composer
- Years active: 1973–present

François Valéry (real name : Jean-Louis Mougeot, born on 4 August 1954, in Oran, French Algeria) is a French singer-songwriter and composer. He is married to Nicole Calfan and Michael Calfan is his son.

== Biography ==
He became famous for his romantic songs and his disco hits of the 1970s and for having composed and performed several soundtracks in the 1980s, following the success of "Dream in Blue", with Sophie Marceau. Valéry was also composer and producer of many songs for various artists (Michèle Torr, Line Renaud, Dalida, Jean Marais, Corinne Hermès, Jeane Manson, Hervé Vilard, Debbie Davis, Lova Moor...), series or films (Joy et Joan (1985), Les Nanas (1985), Les Grandes Marées (1993). He produced Patrick Fiori in the Eurovision Song Contest 1993 with "Mama Corsica". In 2001, he produced the musical L'Ombre d'un géant sung by Rose Laurens and Sophie Delmas. In 2003, he composed the official anthem of the France national rugby union team, "Standing Ovation".

== Discography ==
=== Albums ===
- 1977 : 74-77 (Musidisc)
- 1979 : Chanteur pour filles de 16 ans
- 1980 : Emmanuelle
- 1981 : Chanson d'adieu
- 1981 : Dream in blue
- 1983 : Elle danse Marie
- 1984 : Mon pote le DJ
- 1986 : Ma femme
- 1987 : Putain d'envie de vivre
- 1989 : Aimons-nous vivants
- 1990 : Chante pour les enfants
- 1991 : Tout est écrit
- 1992 : Vies Antérieures (compilation album)
- 1993 : Loin d'être un saint
- 1994 : Il est revenu le soleil (compilation album)
- 1997 : Qu'est-ce qu'on est con
- 2014 : Je suis venu te dire

=== Singles ===
- 1973 : "Et puis c'est tout" (pseudonym : Claude Larra)
- 1974 : "Une chanson d'été"
- 1974 : "Le Prince d'amour"
- 1975 : "Toutes les chansons d'amour sont tristes"
- 1975 : "Lady Music"
- 1976 : "Dormir avec toi"
- 1976 : "Qu'est-ce qu'on a dansé sur cette chanson"
- 1977 : "La Vieille musique"
- 1977 : "Dînons ce soir en amoureux"
- 1978 : "Laisse tomber"
- 1978 : "La Loi d'amour"
- 1979 : "Chanteur pour fille de 16 ans"
- 1979 : "Disco Brasilia"
- 1979 : "Tu as gagné je t'aime"
- 1980 : "Chez Lola"
- 1980 : "Emmanuelle"
- 1980 : "Symphonie pour cœur brisé"
- 1981 : "Chanson d'adieu"
- 1981 : "Dream in Blue" (en duo avec Sophie Marceau)
- 1982 : "Stars, le samedi soir"
- 1982 : "Oran, juin 62"
- 1982 : "Comme une poupée"
- 1983 : "Joy" (soundtrack)
- 1983 : "Elle était venue du Colorado"
- 1983 : "Elle danse, Marie"
- 1984 : "Mon pote le DJ"
- 1984 : "Et dieu créa le rock"
- 1985 : "La Femme qui danse"
- 1985 : "Joy and Joan" (soundtrack)
- 1985 : "Il voit la musique"
- 1986 : "Comme Jimmy Dean"
- 1987 : "Je sais que tu vis"
- 1987 : "Putain d'envie de vivre"
- 1988 : "Esclave de la musique"
- 1989 : "Aimons-nous vivants" – #6 in France
- 1989 : "C'est pas possible" – #32 in France
- 1989 : "C'est la même chanson" – #20 in France
- 1990 : "J'aime l'amour avec toi"
- 1991 : "Qu'est-ce que je t'aime"
- 1991 : "Tout est écrit"
- 1992 : "Changer de vie"
- 1992 : "Loin d'être un saint"
- 1994 : "Il est revenu le soleil"
- 1996 : "Cuba Cuba" – #43 in France
- 1996 : "Que la musique nous éclaire"
- 1997 : "Qu'est ce qu'on est con"
- 1998 : "Au nom de toi"
- 1998 : "Carmen" – #70 in France
- 1999 : "Tout ce que j'aime"
- 2005 : "Jouez Gitans"

=== Collaborations ===
- 1988 : Liban (75 artistes pour le Liban)
- 1989 : "Pour toi Arménie", charity single
