= Kirrwiller =

- Commune
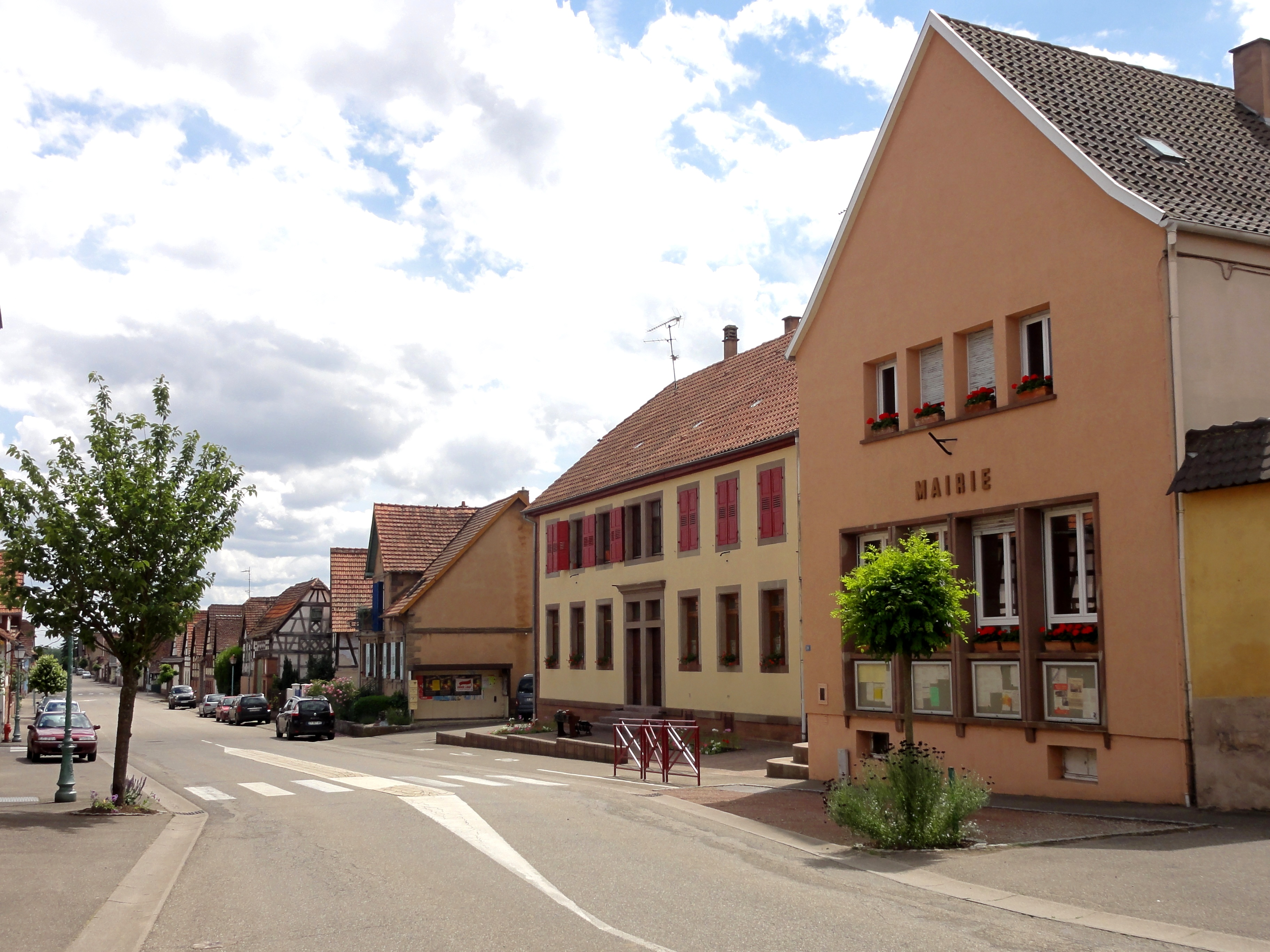
- The town hall and main street in Kirrwiller

- Coat of arms
- Location of Kirrwiller
- Location within France Location within Grand Est
- Coordinates: 48°48′53″N 7°31′51″E
- Country: France
- Region: Grand Est
- Department: Bas-Rhin
- Arrondissement: Saverne
- Canton: Bouxwiller

Government
  - Mayor (2020–2026): Gérard Halter
- Area^{1}: 8.18 km^{2} (3.16 sq mi)
- Highest elevation: 275 m (902 ft)
- Lowest elevation: 179 m (587 ft)
- Population (2023): 533
  - Density: 65.2/km^{2} (169/sq mi)
- Time zone: UTC+01:00 (CET)
  - Summer (DST): UTC+02:00 (CEST)
- INSEE/Postal code: 67242 /67330
- ^{1} French Land Register data, which excludes lakes, ponds, glaciers > 1 km^{2} (0.386 sq mi or 247 acres) and river estuaries.

Kirrwiller (French pronunciation: [kiʁvilɛʁ]; German: Kirweiler; Alsatian: Kìrrwiller) is a commune in the Bas-Rhin département in Grand Est in north-eastern France.

Between 1974 and 2007 Kirrwiller-Bosselshausen was a single commune, but in January 2007, Bosselshausen and Kirrwiller communes were separated.

Kirrwiller is known for its cabaret, the Royal Palace.

== See also ==
- Communes of the Bas-Rhin department
