= Philippe Chatel =

French singer-songwriter (1948–2021)

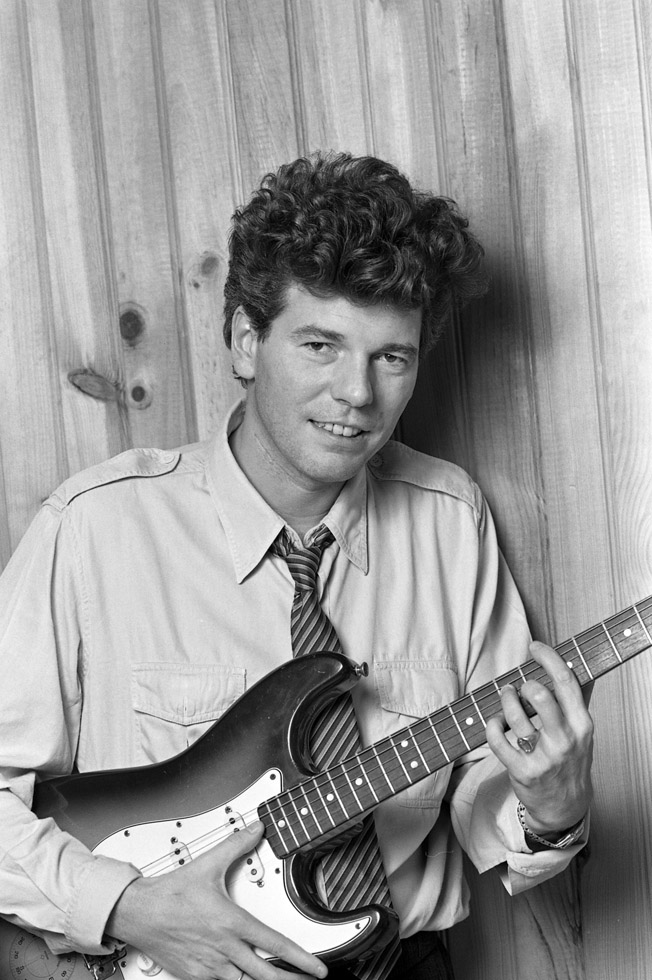
- Born: Philippe de Châteleux de Villeneuve-Bergemont de Duras; 23 February 1948; Paris, France
- Died: 19 February 2021 (aged 72); Paris, France
- Occupation: Singer-songwriter

Philippe Chatel (born Philippe de Châteleux de Villeneuve-Bergemont de Duras), was a French singer-songwriter.

== Career ==
After starting in courier of Henri Salvador, Chatel became familiar with Georges Brassens and then started writing his own songs. He started in 1977 with J't'aime bien Lili, and subsequently wrote and performed Ma lycéenne, Tout quitter mais tout emporter, and Mister Hyde. In 1979, he rose to worldwide fame with his writing of the comedy musical Émilie Jolie. In 1997, a second version was adapted and he directed an animated edition in 2011 with Francis Nielsen. The album for this version won Best Children's Album at the 1999 Victoires de la Musique ceremony. A performance was again adapted in 2018, with less famous actors than previously presented.

In 2016, Chatel released an album titled Renaissance, in which he expressed hope and friendship. In 2021, he was nominated to become a member of the Académie Française, but was passed over for Chantal Thomas.

In addition to his musical activities, Chatel also wrote a biography titled Brassens in 1975 and a novel in 1988 titled Il reviendra, for which he was invited to speak on the talk show Apostrophes. In 2004, he wrote the novel Le Roman d'Émilie Jolie.

== Personal life ==
Chatel was the son of television director François Chatel and was married to Catherine Chatel, with whom he had two children, Émilie (born 1975) and Nicolas (born 1981).

In 2006, Chatel was involved in a serious accident while on a quad bike near Aix-en-Provence and spent three months in a coma. He spent some time in a wheelchair and rehabilitation, and was slightly paralyzed in his jaw for life.

Chatel died of a heart attack on 19 February 2021 in Paris, four days shy of his 73rd birthday.

== Discography ==
- Analyse (1976)
- Salut au temps qui passe (1978)
- Sentiments (1978)
- Maquillages (1981)
- Yin Yang (1982)
- Peau d'âme (1984)
- Anyway (1994)
- Renaissance (2016)

== Bibliography ==
- Brassens (1975)
- Il reviendra (1988)
- Le Roman d'Émilie Jolie (2004)

== Distinctions ==
- Officer of the Ordre des Arts et des Lettres (2018)
