= Vous (song) =

Single by Merwan Rim
- Released: May 2011
- Recorded: 2001
- Genre: Pop
- Label: Klea
- Songwriters: Lydia Ingrid DeJugnac, Merwan Rim

Music video
- "Vous" on YouTube

"Vous", sometimes "Vous...", is the single of French singer Merwan Rim from an upcoming album.

It was released in France in May 2011 peaking at #20 on the French Singles Chart.

== Charts ==
Chart (2011)	Peak position
France (SNEP)	20
