= Albert Cohen (producer) =

Albert Cohen is a French producer of film and television and of French musicals and a radio personality.

== Radio Nostalgie ==
He is a co-founder in 1981 of Radio Nostalgie, and its Lyons affiliate director who engaged in 1984 in launching it as a national radio station in France. By 1986, Radio Nostalgie had already 180 local stations and an international chain of related radio stations.

== Musical productions ==
Starting 1990, Albert Cohen also pursued a musical production career in film, television and documentaries.

In 1998, he was involved in a major musical Les Dix Commandements, co-produced with Dove Attia. He was a producer of the musical Autant en emporte le vent, Le Roi Soleil and Mozart, l'opéra rock also with Dove Attia.

In 2011, he produced 1789: Les Amants de la Bastille.
