= Le Roi Soleil (musical) =

2005 musical comedy about Louis XIV of France

- Original Post
- Music: Various
- Lyrics: Lionel Florence; Patrice Guirao
- Book: Kamel Ouali
- Basis: The life of Louis XIV
- Productions: 2005 Paris; 2014 Tokyo

Le Roi Soleil (French pronunciation: [lə ʁwa sɔlɛj], lit. 'The Sun King') is a French musical about the life of Louis XIV (played by Emmanuel Moire). It premiered on 22 September 2005 at the Palais des Sports in Paris.

== Plot ==
The play begins with the Fronde against Cardinal Mazarin. Young Louis is the consecrated King at Reims, but his power has been confiscated by his mother, Anne of Austria, and the Cardinal, as both doubt his ability to rule France alone.

Louis falls in love with Marie Mancini, an Italian emigrant without noble birth, niece of Cardinal Mazarin. To prove himself as a man, the young monarch decides to join the war at the head of his armies despite Marie's attempt to stop him due to her bad premonition. Louis falls in battle, victim to a serious disease, and is believed dead for a long time. The court forgets him and attempts to name his brother Philippe the new King of France. Marie, however, refuses to accept his fate and spends many nights by his bedside praying in tears.

Then, in a sudden turn of events, one of the royal doctors administers a drug that awakens Louis from his sleep. He learns that he has been forgotten by everyone in the country except Marie and his own family. Now desperately in love with the beautiful Italian, Louis proposes to her. Marie reminds him that it is impossible for a French king to marry an Italian of low birth. Anne of Austria, Mazarin and even the Pope would object.

Louis stubbornly dismisses all opposition, declaring that he is King and will therefore decide his own future. Nevertheless, Anne of Austria and Mazarin put an end to the dream by exiling Marie and persuading the young King to marry the Spanish princess. The first act ends with the pain of separation.

The second Act begins with the death of Mazarin, upon which Louis seizes power and becomes the Sun King. He becomes a débauché dallying with various women and forgetting that his people will pay heavy taxes for the construction of his dream palace, the Château de Versailles.

After many events such as the matter of the Man in the Iron Mask and the Poison Affair, Louis attains what he could not achieve with Marie Mancini. He marries, despite opposition, Françoise d'Aubigné, Marquise de Maintenon, a woman without noble birth who was the governess of his illegitimate children with Françoise-Athénaïs, marquise de Montespan.

The final performances of this play were on 6–8 July 2007 in Paris.

== Cast ==
- Louis XIV: Emmanuel Moire.
- Marie Mancini: Anne-Laure Girbal.
- Monsieur, the King's brother: Christophe Maé.
- Françoise d'Aubigné: Cathialine Andria.
- The Duc de Beaufort: Merwan Rim.
- Isabelle, the representative of the people: Victoria Petrosillo.
- Madame de Montespan: Lysa Ansaldi.
- Cardinal Mazarin: Jack Morgan.
- Anne of Austria: Marie Lenoir.

== Songs ==
Act I

- Prélude versaillais - instrumental
- Contre ceux d'en haut - M. Rim & V. Petrosillo
- Qu'avons-nous fait de vous? - V. Petrosillo & M. Rim
- Je serai lui - C. Andria
- Être à la hauteur - E. Moire
- Ça marche - C. Maé
- Où ça mène quand on s'aime - A.-L. Girbal & E. Moire
- Encore du temps - V. Petrosillo, A.-L. Girbal
- Requien Aeternam - V. Petrosillo, M. Rim, A.-L. Girbal
- A qui la faute - C. Maé
- Je fais de toi mon essentiel - E. Moire & A.-L. Girbal
- S'aimer est interdit - A.-L. Girbal & E. Moire

Act 2

- Repartir - M. Rim, V. Petrosillo & C. Andria
- Le ballet des planètes - instrumental
- Pour arriver à moi - E. Moire
- Un geste de vous - L. Ansaldi, C. Maé & E.Moire
- Le bal des monstres - instrumental
- Entre ciel et terre - M. Rim & V. Petrosillo
- Alors d'accord - C. Andria with a child
- J'en appelle - L. Ansaldi
- L'arrestation - instrumental
- Personne n'est personne - V. Petrosillo & C. Andria
- Et vice Versailles - C. Maé & E. Moire
- La vie passe - E. Moire & C. Andria
- Tant qu'on rêve encore - ALL

== International productions ==
=== Japan ===
Presented by the all-female Takarazuka Revue, the production was performed by Star Troupe, starring Reon Yuzuki as Louis XIV. The musical ran from 17 May to 2 June 2014 at Tokyu Theatre Orb in Tokyo.
