= Élie Chouraqui =

French film director and scriptwriter

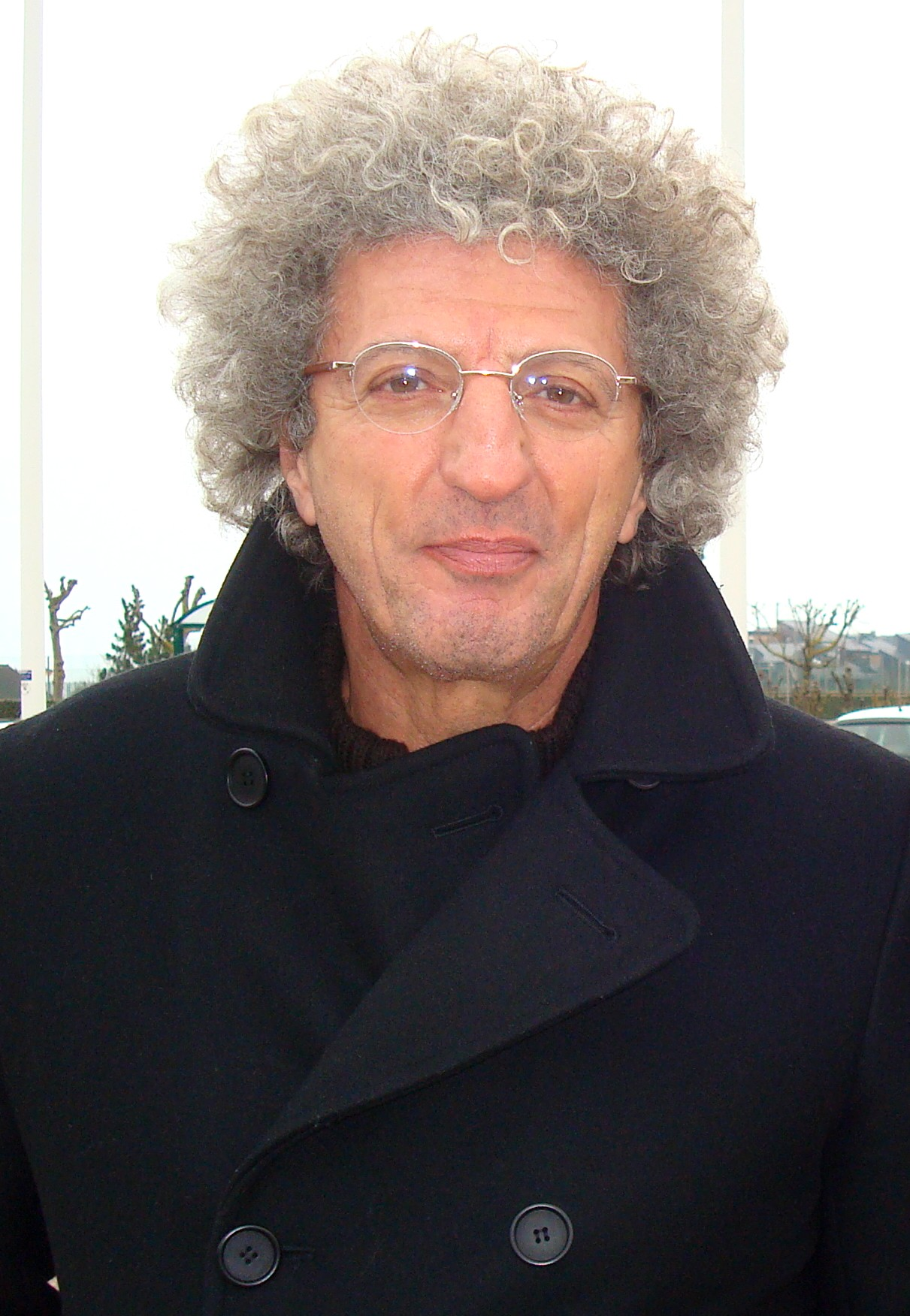
- Elie Chouraqui (2010)
- Born: 3 July 1950 (age 76); Paris, France
- Occupations: Film director, screenwriter, producer
- Years active: 1978–present

Élie Chouraqui (born 3 July 1950) is a French film director, scriptwriter, and comic book writer. His 1996 film Les menteurs was entered into the 46th Berlin International Film Festival.

He made several films with Anouk Aimée.

He ran his own production company named 7 Films Cinéma, aka Sept Films Cinéma.

In his younger days he was a volleyball enthusiast and was captain of the French Volleyball team at the European and World championships winning 112 caps. He commentated on volleyball from French Television at the 2016 Rio Olympics.

== Filmography ==
- 1973: Happy New Year as the inmate who escapes
- 1978: Mon premier amour
- 1980: Une page d'amour
- 1982: Qu'est-ce qui fait courir David?
- 1985: Paroles et Musique
- 1987: Man on Fire
- 1990: Miss Missouri
- 1993: Les marmottes
- 1996: Les menteurs
- 2000: Harrison's Flowers
- 2006: O Jerusalem
- 2009: Celle que j'aime
- 2016: The Origin of Violence

== Musical theatre ==
- 2000: Les Dix Commandements
- 2004: Spartacus le Gladiateur
- 2010: Fallait pas me mentir
