= Sol En Si =

French AIDS charity

Sol En Si, which is short for Solidarité Enfants Sida (translated as "children's AIDS solidarity"), is a French charity organization founded in 1990 by Myriam Mercy and Alain Danand in order to help children suffering from AIDS as well as their families. They provide medical and social aid, beds, food, clothing, and other types of support.

== Charity albums ==
- Sol En Si (Solidarité Enfants Sida) (1993)
- Solidarité Enfants Sida (1995)
- Divers Sol En Si (1995)
- Sol En Si (Solidarité Enfants Sida) (1997)
- Solidarité Enfants Sida (1999)
- Sol En Cirque (2003)
- Le Meilleur De Sol En Si (2005)
- Le Concert Des Grands Gamins Au Zénith (2008)
