= Dove Attia =

Tunisian-born French music producer

- Born: Jules Dove Attia; 8 June 1957 (age 68); Tunis, Tunisia
- Education: École Polytechnique
- Occupation: Music producer

Jules Dove Attia (Arabic: جول دوف عطية) better known as Dove Attia (born in Tunisia on 8 June 1957), is a musical producer and television personality.

== Beginnings ==
Dove Attia is a French citizen born to a Tunisian father who was an electrician and a French mother. At 15 he studied guitar and tried his hand at composition and singing, particularly rock music. Dreaming of a music career, he formed his own school band with some of his schoolmates. After getting his baccalaureate, he settled in Paris where he studied at Lycée Chaptal and he became an intern at Lycée Saint-Louis. He also continued his studies at l'École polytechnique and received a Master of Advanced Studies (DEA) at Université Paris-Dauphine. After graduation, he taught mathematics, physics and chemistry at Lycée Chaptal where he had studied. And starting 1990, he prepared students at the lycée for placement in various higher education institutions.

== Career ==
In the early 1990s he worked as an author and a journalist preparing in collaboration with Léon Zitrone a collection of documentary videos about the most important events of the 20th century. In 1996, he also co-wrote with Albert Cohen a biographical book La légende du 100m: Un siècle pour une seconde a biography of runner Carl Lewis. He held high administrative positions as General Director of the main French television station TF1's international operations, and later as president of Tekelec Europe, provider of electronic products.

Dove Attia then moved on to cowrite with Lambert Vincent the scenario for the Didier Delaître feature television film Passion assasine. The film was produced by "7 Films" (a production company run by Elie Chouraqui and Alain Cohen). Passion assasine was broadcast on M6 television station in 2000.

He produced a number of high-profile French musicals, founding his niche in musical comedy. In 2000, he produced Les Dix Commandements in collaboration with friend and associate Albert Cohen and Elie Chouraqui. He was the producer of the musicals Autant en emporte le vent (2003), Les Hors-la-Loi (2005), Le Roi Soleil (2005) and Mozart, l'opéra rock (2009) 1789: Les Amants de la Bastille (2012), La Légende du roi Arthur (2015).

In 2019, he was commissioned by the Japanese all-female theatre troupe Takarazuka Revue to compose the music for an original musical Casanova based on the life of Giacomo Casanova, directed by Hirokazu Ikuta. The Revue had previously performed multiple of his musicals, such as Le Roi Soleil (2014), 1789, les amants de la Bastille (2015 and 2023), La Légende du roi Arthur (2016) and Mozart, l'opéra rock (2019). In 2023, he worked with Shuichiro Koike for Japanese musical Lupin; previously Koike directed adaptations of his works, this musical is their first original production.

== In popular culture ==
Starting 2003, he was part of the jury of television reality series À la Recherche de la Nouvelle Star on M6 with Varda Kakon, Lionel Florence and André Manoukian. He came back for future seasons with the program being renamed Nouvelle Star and when Marianne James replaced Varda Kakon and Manu Katché, who replaced Lionel Florence. He quit the program in 2007.

== Productions ==
List of best-known productions or co-productions:

- Les Dix Commandements (March 2000)
- Autant en emporte le vent (October 2003)
- Les Hors-la-loi (March 2005) / April 2007)
- Le Roi Soleil (September 2005)
- Dothy et le Magicien d'Oz (2009)
- Mozart, l'opéra rock (2009 to 2011)
- 1789, les amants de la Bastille (2012)
- La Légende du roi Arthur (2014)
- Casanova (2019)
- Molière, l'opéra urbain (2023)
