= Dôme de Paris =

Indoor arena located in the 15th arrondissement of Paris, France

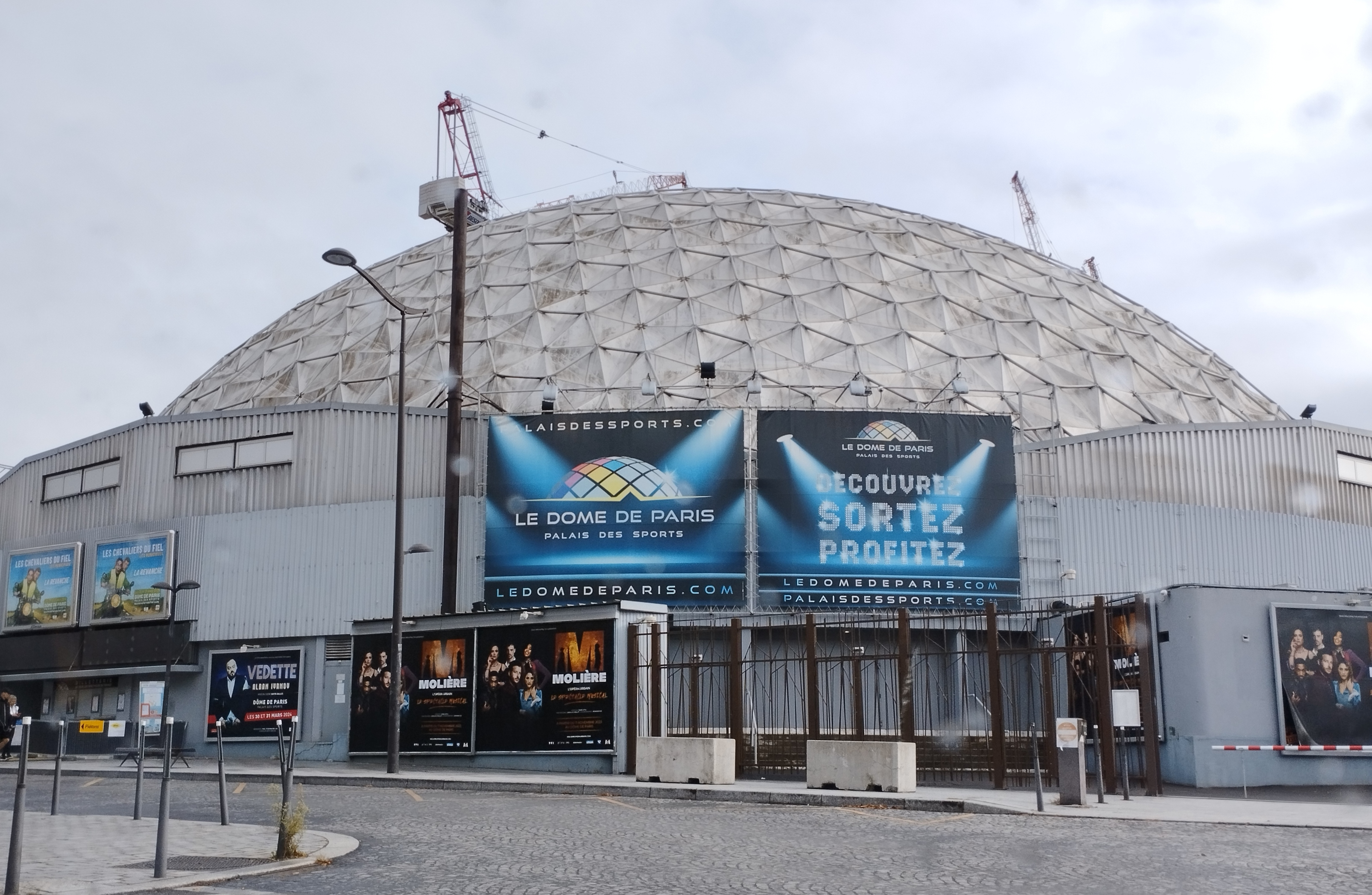
- Venue façade in 2023
- Interactive map of Dôme de Paris
- Full name: Dôme de Paris—Palais des Sports
- Former names: Palais des Sports (1960-2015)
- Address: 34 Boulevard Victor; 75015 Paris, France
- Location: 15th arrondissement
- Coordinates: 48°49′57″N 2°17′10″E
- Owner: Société d'exploitation du palais des sports
- Capacity: 4,600

Construction
- Groundbreaking: 1959
- Opened: 1960
- Renovated: 1975, 2002
- Architects: Pierre Dufau; Buckminster Fuller; Victor Parjadis de Larivière
- General contractor: Eiffel

Website
- Venue Website

The Dôme de Paris (French pronunciation: [dom də paʁi]; originally the Palais des Sports) is an indoor arena located in the 15th arrondissement of Paris, France. The closest metro station is Porte de Versailles.

== Background ==
The venue was built in 1959 to replace the old Vel’ d’Hiv' at the Porte de Versailles. With a capacity of 4,600 seats, it was the largest venue in Paris. The architects and engineers created a dome with the largest light alloy dome ever designed in the world made of 1,100 aluminum panels.

Since its first season, it has presented shows and concerts, such as The Beatles, The Rolling Stones, Grateful Dead, Pink Floyd, Genesis, Josephine Baker, U2, Queen, Liza Minnelli, Diana Ross, Dalida, Johnny Hallyday, Sylvie Vartan, the Harlem Globetrotters, Holiday on Ice, Little Mix, and The Fab Four in addition to events such as boxing matches. It is notable as being the venue where the original 1980 French production of Les Misérables premiered. Genesis recorded a series of shows at the venue in 1977 which can be heard on the live album Seconds Out.

Over the years, people from all over the world have come to the Dôme de Paris to see music hall and sports legends, dancers, ice skaters, circus shows, musical shows (Les Dix Commandements, Le Roi Soleil) and other shows such as ones directed by Robert Hossein, a pioneer in big French shows.

== See also ==
- List of indoor arenas in France
