= Vivre ou survivre (Daniel Balavoine song) =

Single by Daniel Balavoine

from the album Vendeurs de larmes
- Released: April 1982
- Recorded: 1982 in Ibiza
- Genre: Pop rock
- Length: 3:34
- Label: Barclay Records
- Songwriter(s): Daniel Balavoine
- Producer(s): Léo Missir

Daniel Balavoine singles chronology
"La vie ne m'apprend rien" (1981)	"Vivre ou survivre" (1982)	"Vendeurs de larmes" (1982)

Music video
- "Vivre ou survivre" on YouTube

"Vivre ou survivre" is a famous French language song written, composed and sung by the French singer Daniel Balavoine. It appears on his 1982 album Vendeurs de larmes. It was the start of a big career for Balavoine and an example of new wave revival of rock music in France.

== Track listings ==
Album version

1. "Vivre ou survivre" – 3:34

== Credits and personnel ==
- Lead vocals – Daniel Balavoine
- Producers – Léo Missir
- Music – Daniel Balavoine
- Lyrics – Daniel Balavoine
- Label: Barclay Records

== Other versions ==
Natasha St-Pier recorded the song, releasing it as the B side of her single "Un ange frappe à ma porte" (2006). She also sang it with the 500 Choristes; this version appears as "Vivre ou survivre (Version chorale)", on her album Tu trouveras... 10 ans de succès (2009).

Christophe Maé has performed the song live. Sébastien Agius, the winner of the first series of X Factor in France, sang the song during the show.

== Matthew Raymond-Barker version ==
"Vivre ou survivre"

Single by Matthew Raymond-Barker
- Released: 2 July 2011
- Recorded: 2011
- Genre: Pop rock
- Length: 2:59
- Label: Sony Music Entertainment
- Songwriter(s): Daniel Balavoine

"Vivre ou survivre" is the first single by the English singer Matthew Raymond-Barker, winner of the second series of X Factor in France, where it was released as a download on 2 July 2011. He performed the song live in the final.

=== Track listing ===
Digital download

1. "Vivre ou survivre" – 2:59

=== Charts ===
Chart (2011)	Peak position
Belgium (Ultratop 50 Wallonia)	23
France (SNEP)	94

=== Release history ===
Region	Date	Format	Label
France	2 July 2011	Digital download	Sony Music Entertainment
