= Popstars (French TV series) =

French reality television series

Popstars is a French musical reality TV series based on the international series of the same name. The French television series was broadcast on M6 for 4 seasons and was a pioneer in musical competitions in France. It is currently broadcast on D8.

The first season of French Popstars was launched on 20 September 2001 and continued until 20 December 2001 won by L5, followed by a second season 2002 won by Whatfor, a third season in 2004 (known as Popstars - le duel) won by Linkup, and a fourth season after 4 years of interruption, held in 2007 and won by Sheryfa Luna.

The first season was to launch pop groups from casting to the launch of a debut album, whereas series 4 was for launching of a solo artist. Genres of music presented ranged form pop to rock, R&B, rap and hip hop. Contrary to other competitions, eliminations were decided by a jury and not by the public.

The show is due to return on 12 September 2024 on Amazon Prime Video.

== Season 1 (2001) ==
- Broadcast: 20 September - 20 December 2001
- Judges:
  - Santi, former general director of Mercury France
  - Mia Frye, choreographer
  - Pascal Broussot, artistic director of M6
- Winners:
  - L5 - a girl group made up of Lydy (known as Louisy Joseph), Marjorie, Coralie, Alexandra and Claire)

== Season 2 (2002) ==
- Broadcast: 29 August - 19 December 2002
- Judges:
  - Valéry Zeitoun, director of AZ, a subsidiary of Universal Music
  - Bruno Vandelli, choreographer
  - Elisabeth Anaïs, songwriter
- Winners: Whatfor made up of Cyril, Nicolas, Érika and Monia (Monia Righi)

== Season 3 (2003) ==
- Broadcast: 28 August - 20 November 2004
- This season was named "Popstars - le duel"
- Judges:
  - Olivier Nusse, general director of ULM
  - Angie Cazaux-Berthias, vocal coach, singer
  - Roberto Ciurleo, director of NRJ radio station
- Winners: Linkup made up of Matthieu (Matthieu Tota) (later famous as M. Pokora), Lionel (Lionel Tim) and Otis
- Runners-up (in duel): Diadems

== Season 4 (2007) ==
- Broadcast: 3 September - 26 October 2007
- Judges:
  - Mia Frye, choreographer
  - Benjamin Chulvanij, Music producer and director
  - Sébastien Farran, music manager
  - Ophélie Winter, songwriter and singer
- Workshop
  - D.Dy: singing and urban flow workshop
  - Youssoupha: writing workshop
  - Nancy Marie-Claire: dance workshop
- Winner: Sheryfa Luna (solo)
- Other participants - Eliminations after:
  - day 1: Fabio
  - day 3: Delphine
  - day 7: Lakdar, Noémie, Jonathan, Gabrielle, Samir and Mehdi (later the duo Twem)
  - day 10: Sullivan and Emeraude
  - day 12: Keda, Wendee, Salim, Ibtisame
  - day 14: Yéché
  - day 20: Nicolas, Romain, Priscillia and Nathanael
  - day 25: Vanessa, Pierre-Jean, St Cyr
  - day 30 (before the finals): Moussa, Isaac, Zack, Marion, Léa
  - Finalists: Jessie and Hadja (with finalist Sheryfa Luna winning the contest)

== Season 5 (2013) ==
- Broadcast: 28 May 2013 - 2 July 2013
- Channel : D8
- Judges: Alexia Laroche-Joubert, La Fouine, Philippe Gandilhon.
- Winners: The Mess (girl group)
- Runners-up: Oslo (pop rock duo)

== Season 6 (2024) ==
- Broadcast: 12 September 2024 - 19 September 2024
- Channel : Amazon Prime Video
- Judges: Alonzo, Eddy de Pretto, Louane
- Winners: SOR4 (girl group)

== In popular culture ==
- Of the participants in Popstars as part of groups, Louisy Joseph (of L5) from season 1 and M. Pokora (of Linkup) of season 3 went on to have successful solo careers
- Identical twin brother Samir and Mehdi formed later the duo Twem and took part in both the British and the French X Factor competition.
- Winner from season 4 Sheryfa Luna became a successful artist. 4th season contestant Léa Castel also had a solo career, whereas Zack, from season 4 became a professional dancer and dance instructor in French X Factor in its second season
