= The Mess =

French girl group

- Origin: France
- Genre: Pop
- Years active: 2013-2014
- Labels: Columbia, Sony Music
- Past members: Chéraze; Kendy; Léa; Megan

The Mess was a French girl group who took part in season 5 of French reality television series Popstars in 2013 on D8, winning the final on 2 July 2013 against eventual runner-ups, the duo Oslo, which consists of Eugénie and Vincent. The three-member jury made up of La Fouine, Alexia Laroche-Joubert and Philippe Gandilhon opted for The Mess, which consists of Megan, Léa, Chéraze and Kendy.

Prior to their third single "Je t'attendrai encore", Kendy left the band. Originally scheduled for 6 October 2014, The Mess' debut album has finally been cancelled by their label Columbia/Sony Music and The Mess split amicably.

The group was awarded a record deal that includes at least a debut single and a studio album. The debut single of the winning formation was "Au top" written by Maître Gims and Renaud Rebillaud. It entered the French SNEP official singles chart at number 34 the week following the finale. Their second single has been Honneur aux dames, that featured French rapper Canardo, but failed to chart.

== Discography ==
=== Singles ===
Year	Single	Peak positions
Year	Single	FR
2013	"Au top"	34
2013	"Honneur aux dames" (featuring Canardo)	—
2014	"Je t'attendrai encore"	—

== After the Mess ==
Chéraze, after breaking up from The Mess continued on a solo career with a hit in 2015 entitled "Promets pas la lune" charting in SNEP, the official French Singles Chart. The rapper Tunisiano appears on the vocals with a rap section, although the official cover doesn't credit him. He also appears in the music video for the song.
