= Twem =

French twin singers

- Origin: France
- Genres: Pop, soul, R&B
- Years active: 2000-present
- Members: Sam BENI (Samir Ben Nouh); DiDi BENI (Mehdi Ben Nouh)
- Website: twem.fr

Twem are a French pop duo made up of French-Moroccan and Algerian identical twins Samir (Sam BENI) and Mehdi (DiDi BENI) Beni Nouh (Arabic: سمير ومهدي بن نوح). They are known for appearances in a number of talent competitions including Graines de Stars, Popstars and X Factor programs in both UK in 2010 and France 2011.

== Career ==
The name Twem (in Arabic توام) means "twin" in colloquial Arabic. It also means "lucky". The Twem come from Marseille, France, and were born in 1983 to Wahiba Ben Nouh. But they moved to Paris to study and pursue their dream for a musical career. They started singing early and both were part of the school choir in their teens.

They had their first public appearance when they were 17. Mehdi Ben Nouh (sometimes written Medhi or Medy or DiDi) appeared in on the popular French talent show on M6 called Graines de Stars in 2000 singing Queen's "Bohemian Rhapsody". Samir also appeared in the same show as Sam Ben Nouh. Both Sam and Medy brothers were chosen in the final 5 for singing the winning song of maxi edition of the show alongside Cathia, Mathieu and Mario singing "On avait tous un grand rêve" (meaning they all have a great dream).

In 2004, they were in the final of Les voix de la chance organized by Française des Jeux 2004 where they sang a special song "Ceux qui ont besoin".

In 2007 they were contestants in French edition of Popstars broadcast on M6 where they qualified for many weeks in the third season of the French series. They sometimes sang together and sometimes were put against each other while singing with other contestants. Mehdi sang with Sebastien and Samir with Michael.

In the winter of 2010, they traveled to London from Paris to take part in the seventh season of the UK The X Factor. In the third week of the auditions, broadcast on August 29, 2010, they sang Lady Gaga's "Just Dance" changing the lyric to "Just Twem" getting great audience reaction. In bootcamp they sang Gnarls Barkley's "Crazy" reaching the final 24 with the support of judges Louis Walsh and Cheryl Cole and despite being consistently voted down by Simon Cowell, who commented to Louis Walsh: "This is the effect you're now having. The two monsters [Jedward] you created are now spreading across Europe. Here it comes back again." The satirical website Vote for the Worst commented: "Simon Cowell's worst nightmare just came true as an act that makes John & Edward seem more like Rambo & Conan" Twem however resisted the obvious comparison in the eyes of the British public with 2009 season's Jedward, the identical twin act of brothers John and Edward Grimes. In the judges house section, as one of the final 6 acts Cowell, who was mentoring the groups for the season, they sang David Guetta and Kelly Rowland song "When Love Takes Over" but did not qualify for the final 12. Twem also appeared on Xtra Factor and asked about their experiences.

In 2011, they auditioned to the French series of X Factor in its second season and despite great opposition from Olivier Schultheis, reached the final 12, where they were mentored by Henry Padovani. In Week 1 of the live shows broadcast on 19 April 2011, they performed "The Rhythm of the Night" from Corona with choreography by Zack Reece. They were voted "Bottom 2" alongside Oméga, yet another group mentored by the same judge Padovani. They sang "Quand on n'a que l'amour" from Belgian singer-songwriter Jacques Brel in a bid to be saved from elimination. As the judges decision was hung at 2-2 (Véronic DiCaire and Christophe Willem for keeping Twem and Henry Padovani and Olivier Schultheis for keeping Oméga, the panel resorted to "public vote" that favoured Oméga giving Twem the lesser votes. Twem were eliminated on the basis of public vote finishing 12th overall. After elimination, they were interviewed by Radio Vibration.

== Media appearances ==
- In 2007, they were featured in Jardin secret talking about their journey as a twin act.
- After their 2010 X Factor auditions and impact on the public there, in January 2011, they appeared in French TF1 television talent program Vous avez du talent, (meaning "You have talent") where they sang a medley of Lady Gaga's "Just Dance".
- They were also featured in early 2011 in the X Factor UK Annual 2011 as one of the prominent contestants of the 2010 British show. Geri Halliwell was quoted in the annual as saying she would love for Twem to come again to Britain.
- In 2011, they were also picked as one of four identical twins to talk about their life and musical career for a full decade, on Tellement Vrai special series "Jumeaux, jumelles: jamais l'un sans l'autre" (meaning "Twins, never one without the other" presented by Matthieu Delormeau on NRJ 12 French television chain. The program was broadcast on 7 April 2011. They performed "Just Twem" a twist on their signature song "Just Dance" by Lady Gaga. In May 2011, they also performed at Casino de Paris supported by the official Twem fan club. They also expressed their plans to try to represent France in the Eurovision Song Contest 2011.

== Discography ==
- 2013 : EP "2M" (MIRACLE, TAKE THE GUN,..)
- 2011: "Bouger Bouger" (single)
- 2023 : «Oublie-moi»

== References and Notes ==
- Jardin secret about Twem (Part 1) (in French)
- Jardin secret about Twem (Part 2) (in French)
- Tellement Vrai about Twem (Part 1) (in French)
- Tellement Vrai about Twem (Part 2) (in French)
- Tellement Vrai about Twem (Part 3) (in French)
