= The X Factor (British TV series) series 7 =

Season of television series

The X Factor
- Series 7
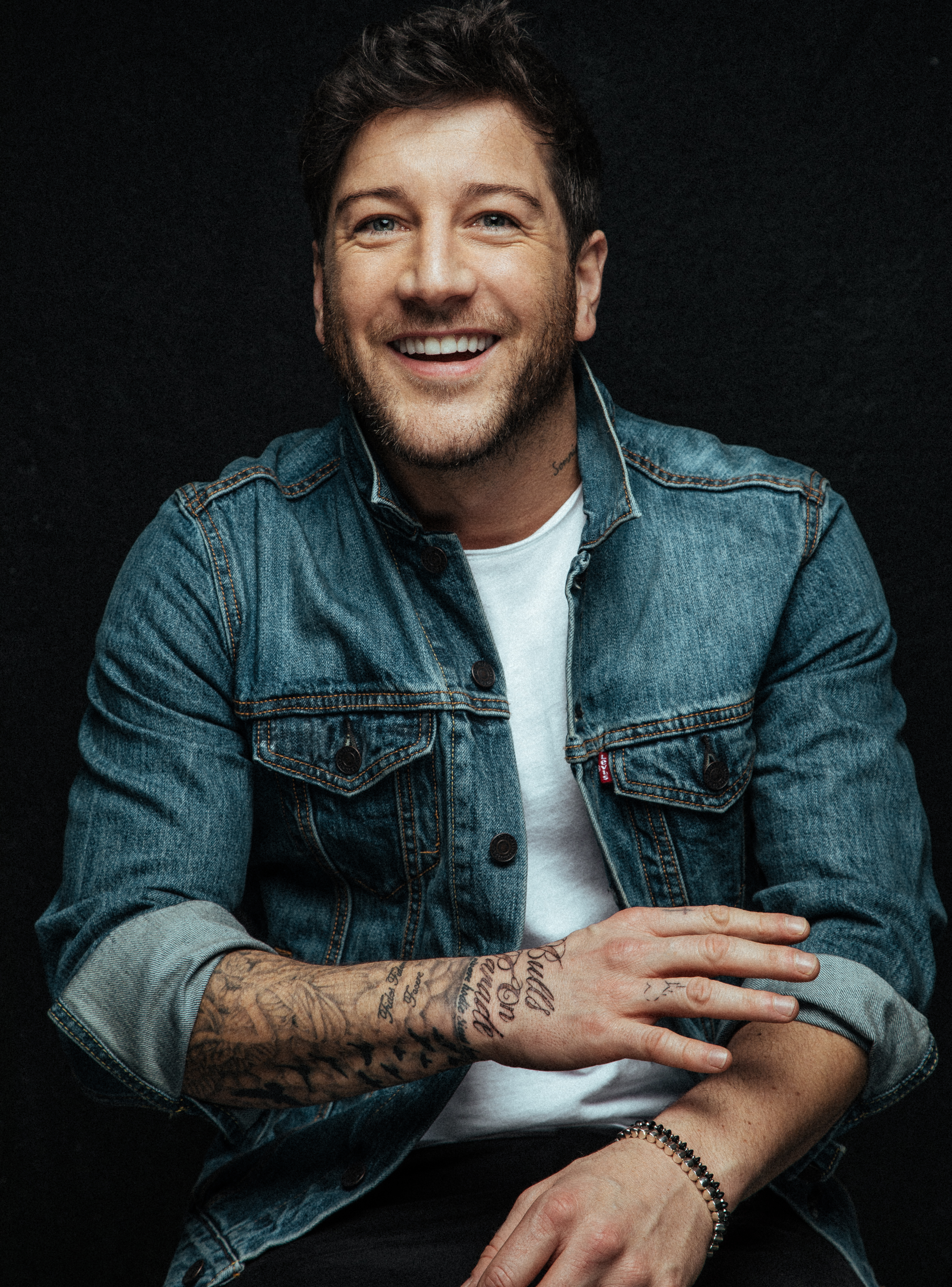
- Cardle in Stockport promoting the release of The Fire.
- Hosted by: Dermot O'Leary (ITV); Konnie Huq (ITV2)
- Judges: Simon Cowell; Cheryl Cole; Dannii Minogue; Louis Walsh; Geri Halliwell (Glasgow auditions); Natalie Imbruglia (Birmingham auditions); Katy Perry (Dublin auditions); Pixie Lott (Cardiff auditions); Nicole Scherzinger (Manchester auditions and bootcamp)
- Winner: Matt Cardle
- Winning mentor: Dannii Minogue
- Runner-up: Rebecca Ferguson
- Finals venue: The Fountain Studios

Release
- Original network: ITV; ITV2 (The Xtra Factor)
- Original release: 21 August – 12 December 2010

Series chronology
- ← Previous; Series 6 Next → Series 8

The X Factor is a British television music competition to find new singing talent. The seventh series started on ITV on 21 August 2010 and ended on 12 December 2010. The series saw the creation of boyband One Direction, five boys who entered the competition as soloists. The winner of the series was Matt Cardle. He was mentored throughout the show by Dannii Minogue. After the victory, he released his debut single "When We Collide". A total of 15,448,019 votes were cast throughout the series. It was presented by Dermot O'Leary, with spin-off show The Xtra Factor presented by Konnie Huq on ITV2, who took over from Holly Willoughby.

The competition was split into several stages: auditions, bootcamp, judges' houses and live shows. Auditions took place throughout June and July 2010, with Simon Cowell, Dannii Minogue, Louis Walsh and Cheryl Cole returning as judges. Minogue missed the auditions and bootcamp due to being on maternity leave, so Geri Halliwell, Natalie Imbruglia, Katy Perry, Pixie Lott and Nicole Scherzinger were brought in as guest judges. Cole missed the auditions in Manchester and bootcamp because she had malaria. Following bootcamp, successful acts were split into four categories: Boys, Girls, Over 28s and Groups. Minogue and Cole returned for the judges' houses stage, and each judge mentored eight acts through judges' houses. The live shows started on 9 October 2010. Four acts initially eliminated at judges' houses were brought back as wildcards, making this series the first to have 16 acts perform in the live shows.

This was the first series of the show to be filmed in high definition, and was broadcast on ITV1 HD and STV HD. From October, The Xtra Factor was also shown in high definition, broadcast on the new channel ITV2 HD. It was sponsored by TalkTalk in the United Kingdom and Domino's Pizza in Ireland.

This series proved to be highly controversial, with many people complaining about the use of pitch correction software on the broadcast of contestants' auditions, the decision to form two groups out of rejected soloists at bootcamp, the rejection of popular contestant Gamu Nhengu at judges' houses, Cole abstaining to vote against one of her own acts she mentored in week 5 of the live shows and having a final showdown in the semi-final. Controversy also surrounded contestants Shirlena Johnson, who was axed over fears for her mental health, and Treyc Cohen, who was reported to already have a record deal when the live shows started. There were also accusations of fixing, which were denied by the show's producers. Despite the controversies, this series was the most watched series to date, with an average of 14.13 million viewers per episode. The final was watched by 17.71 million people, making it the highest rated television episode of 2010, and the entire decade, in the UK. The season tended to occupy a 7.30 PM timeslot.

== Judges, presenters and other personnel ==
Judges and Presenter(s) for The X Factor Series 7

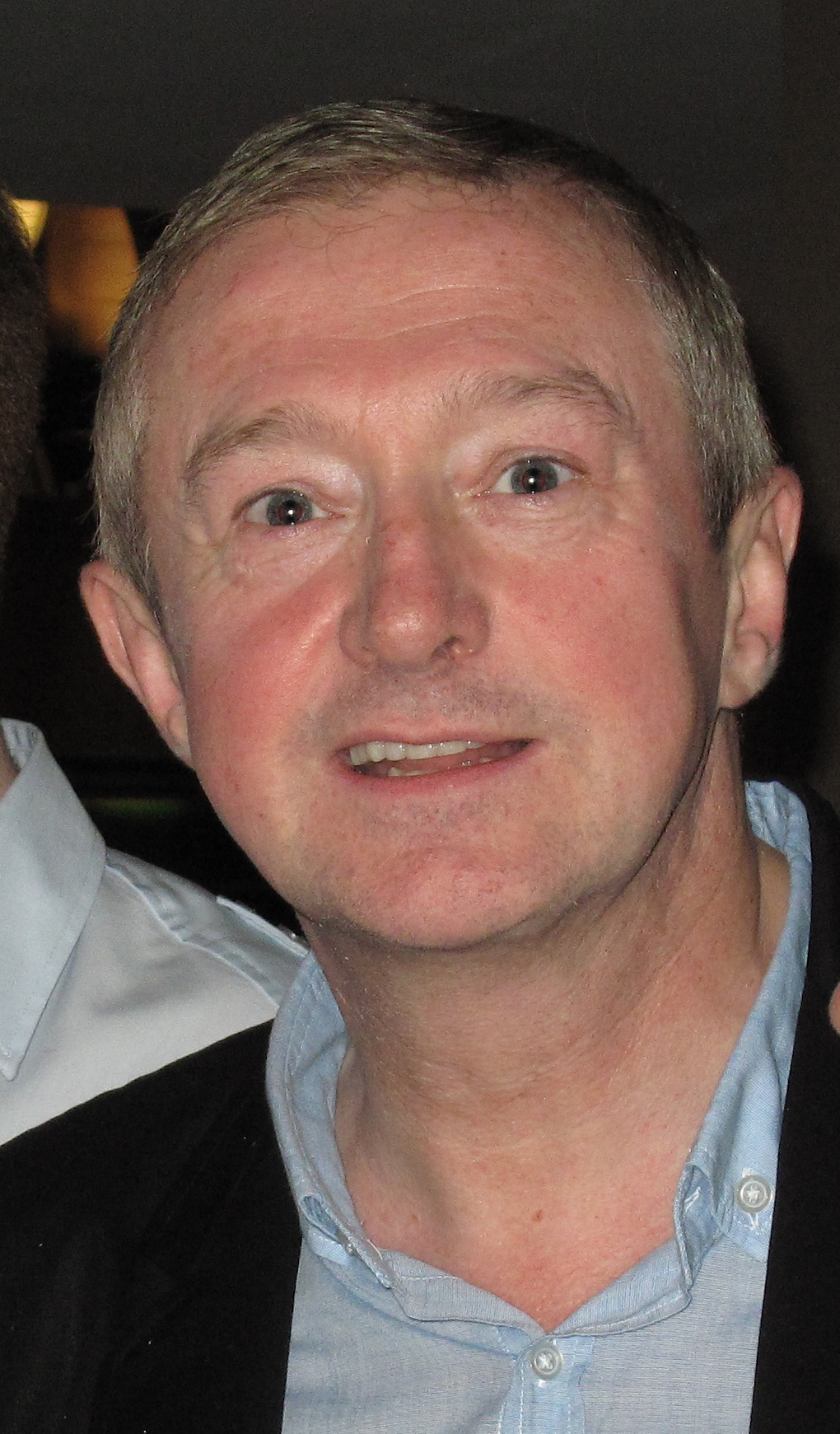
Louis Walsh

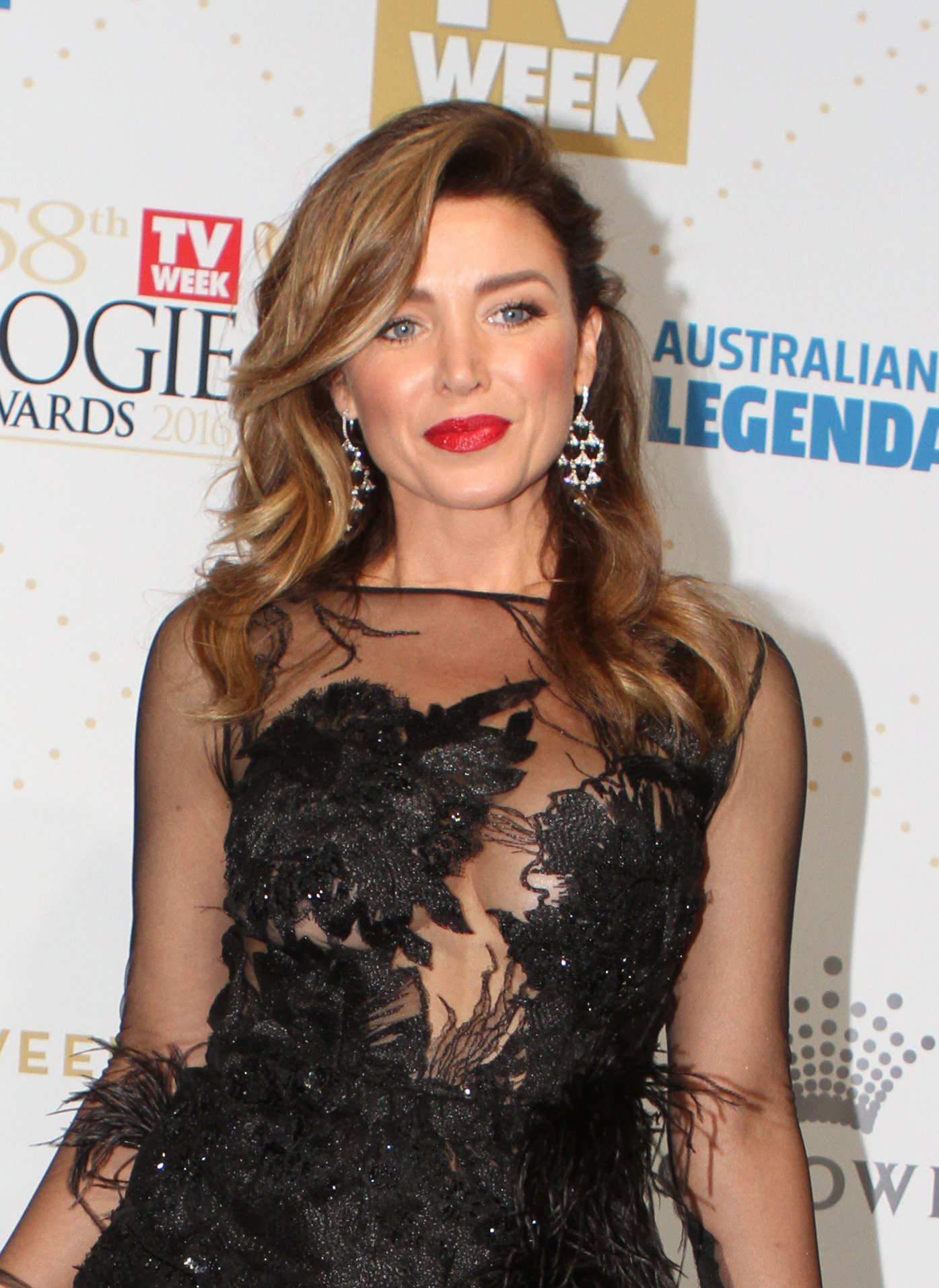
Dannii Minogue

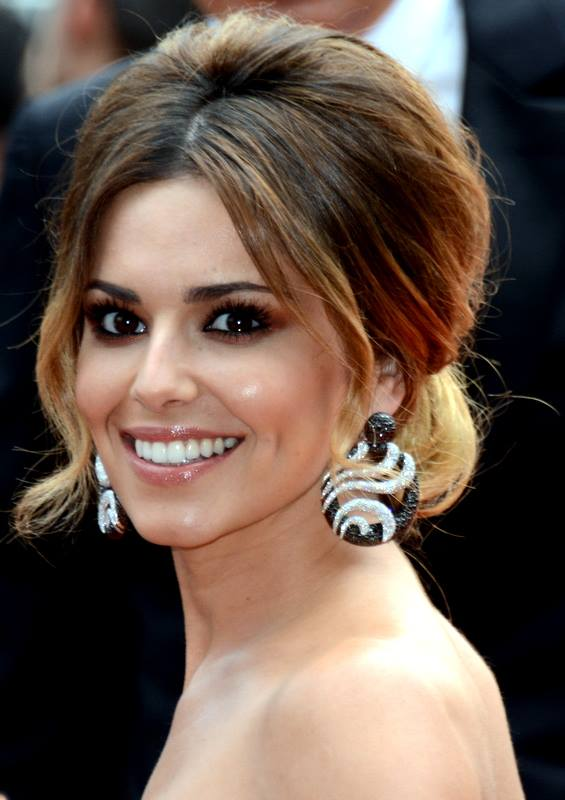
Cheryl Cole

Simon Cowell

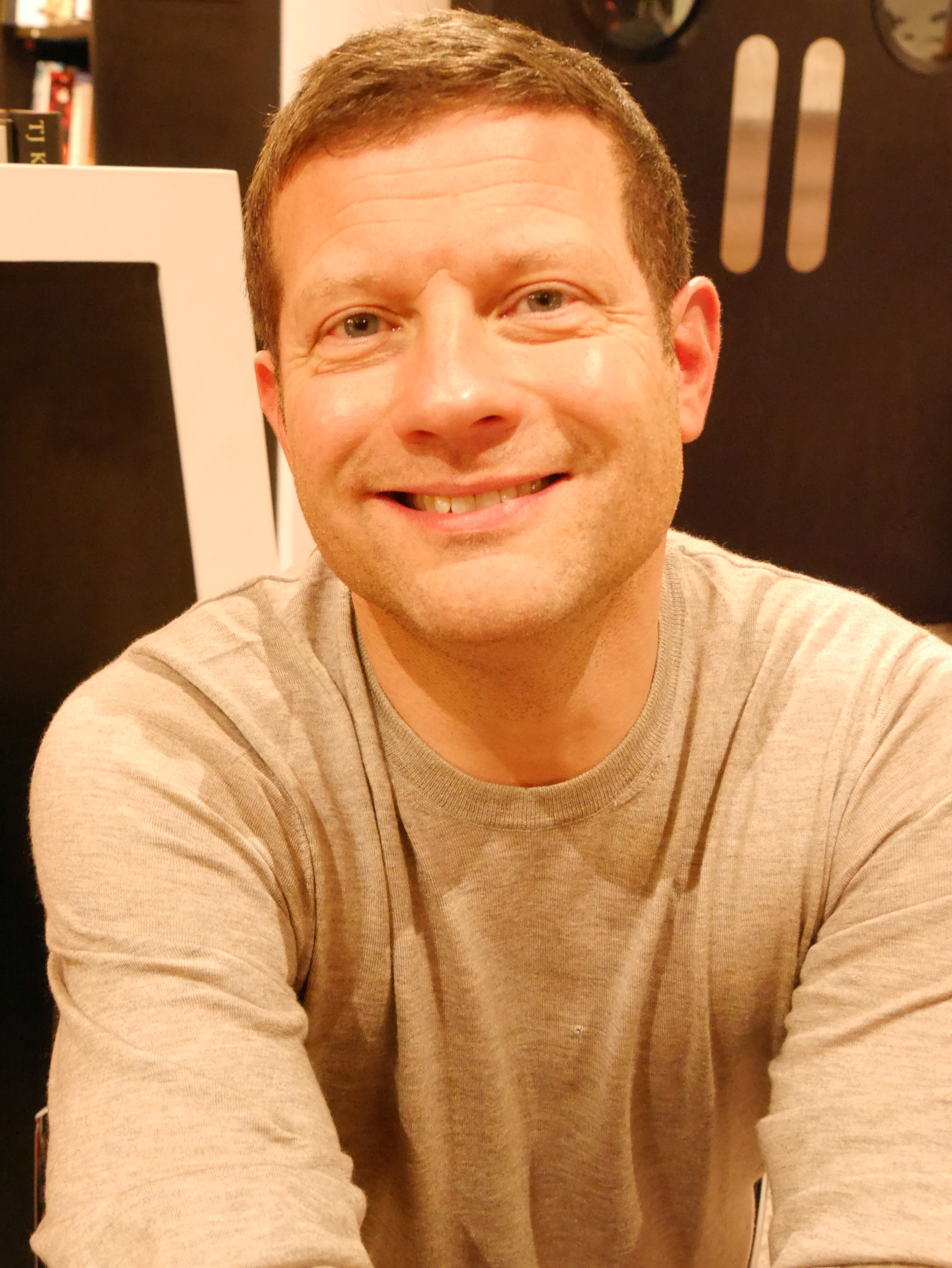
Dermot O'Leary (ITV1)

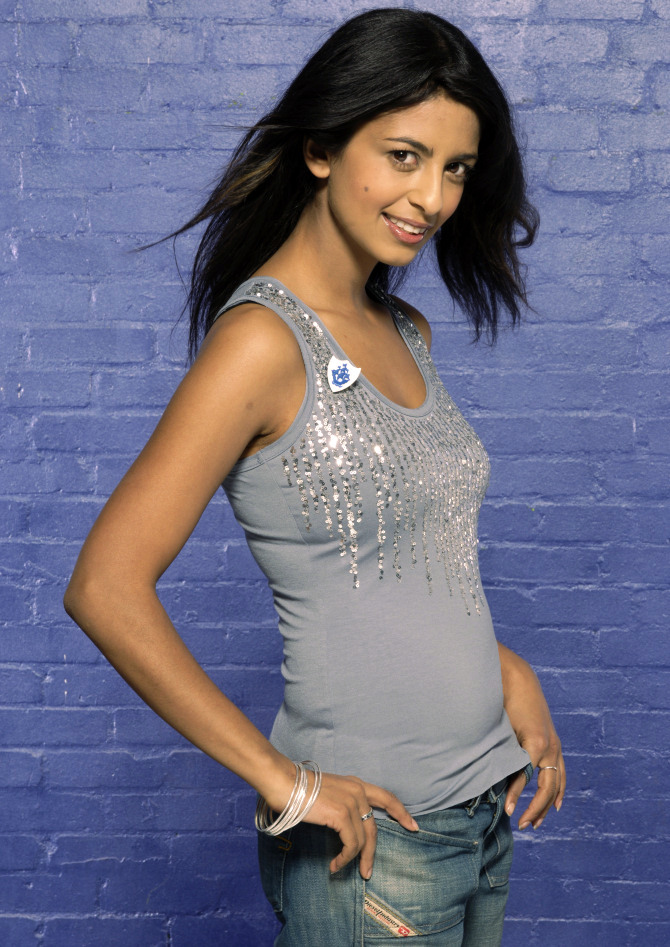
Konnie Huq (ITV2)

In February 2010, Dannii Minogue confirmed that she would not attend the auditions for series 7 due to being pregnant. It was confirmed that guest judges would take Minogue's place alongside Simon Cowell, Louis Walsh and Cheryl Cole during the auditions. The guest judges were Geri Halliwell, Natalie Imbruglia, Katy Perry, Pixie Lott and Nicole Scherzinger. On 11 June, Minogue was confirmed by ITV to return for the judges' houses stage. Cole missed the Manchester auditions and bootcamp due to having malaria, so Scherzinger returned as a guest judge for bootcamp. Cole then returned for the judges' houses stage. Dermot O'Leary returned for his fourth series as presenter of the main show on ITV, but Holly Willoughby did not return for her third series as presenter on The Xtra Factor on ITV2 and was replaced by Konnie Huq. Brian Friedman returned as creative director, while Ali Tennant and Savan Kotecha were hired as vocal coaches. However, Tennant's contract was ended before the live shows and was replaced by Yvie Burnett, who worked as vocal coach from series 2–6. Richard "Biff" Stannard began working as show song producer for Minogue's contestant, and Grace Woodward began working on the show as fashion director.

== Selection process ==
=== Applications and auditions ===
Cities that auditions were held in.

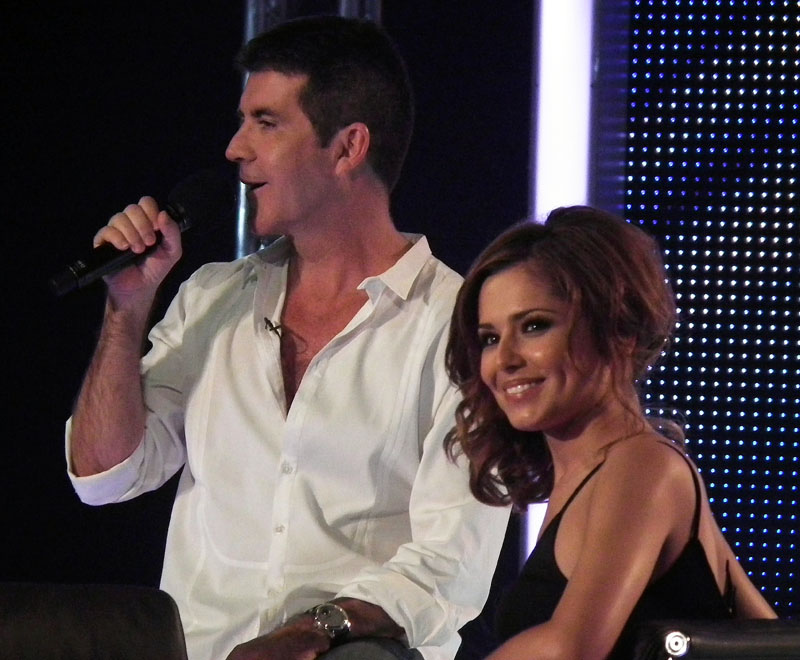
Judges Simon Cowell and Cheryl Cole during filming of the London auditions on 21 June 2010.

The first appeal for applicants for series 7 was broadcast during series 6 on 5 December 2009. Applicants for the seventh series were given the opportunity to apply by uploading a video audition to the Internet. Auditions began in June 2010 in six cities: Glasgow (SEC Centre, 9 June), Birmingham (LG Arena, 13–14 June), London (ExCeL London, 21–24 June), Dublin (Convention Centre Dublin, 28 June), Cardiff (International Arena, 2 July), and Manchester (Manchester Central, 9–11 July). Dublin returned as an audition city for the first time since the third series in 2006.

Halliwell was the first guest judge, and attended the Glasgow auditions. Imbruglia was the second guest judge, appearing for the Birmingham auditions. The guest judge slot was axed for the London auditions, but continued with Perry judging in Dublin, Lott in Cardiff and Scherzinger at the auditions in Manchester. Cole was unable to attend the Manchester auditions because she had contracted malaria and was not replaced for them.

The first episode, broadcast on 21 August 2010, featured auditions from Glasgow and London, while episode two, on 28 August, showcased Dublin's auditions and more from London. More London auditions were shown on 4 September, along with those from Birmingham, and Cardiff was featured in 11 September broadcast along with the final set of London auditions. Finally, the Manchester auditions were shown in the 18 and 19 September episodes.

Summary of auditions
City	Date(s)	Venue	Guest Judge(s)	Permanent Judges
Glasgow	9 June 2010	SEC Centre	Geri Halliwell	Louis Walsh; Cheryl Cole; Simon Cowell
Birmingham	13–14 June 2010	LG Arena	Natalie Imbruglia	Louis Walsh; Cheryl Cole; Simon Cowell
London	21–24 June 2010	ExCeL London	None	Louis Walsh; Cheryl Cole; Simon Cowell
Dublin	28 June 2010	Convention Centre Dublin	Katy Perry	Louis Walsh; Cheryl Cole; Simon Cowell
Cardiff	2 July 2010	International Arena	Pixie Lott	Louis Walsh; Cheryl Cole; Simon Cowell
Manchester	9–11 July 2010	Manchester Central	Nicole Scherzinger	Louis Walsh; Simon Cowell

=== Bootcamp ===
The bootcamp stage of the competition began on 22 July 2010 at Wembley Arena, London and was broadcast on 25–26 September. Minogue continued her maternity leave and Cole did not attend because she was still in recovery. As Cole and Minogue were absent, producers of the show decided to axe bootcamp's live audience. The bootcamp stage was broadcast in two episodes on 25 and 26 September. The first day of bootcamp saw Cowell and Walsh split the 211 acts into their four categories: Boys, Girls, Over 25s and Groups. They received vocal coaching and each category later performed one song: the Boys sang "Man in the Mirror", the Girls sang "If I Were a Boy", the Over 25s sang "Poker Face" and the Groups sang "Nothing's Gonna Stop Us Now". At the end of the day, the number of acts was cut to 108. On the second day, acts were given dance lessons by creative director Brian Friedman but they were not judged on their performances.

Scherzinger then returned as a guest judge on the third day, where each act performed one song from a list of 40. On the fifth day, Scherzinger suggested that the Over 25s category be changed to the Over 28s, as the quality of older singers was high. The Boys and Girls categories then comprised singers aged 16 to 27, rather than 16 to 24. As the Groups category was the weakest, five rejected soloists from the Boys category and four from the Girls category were made into two groups, One Direction and Belle Amie respectively. After bootcamp, each judge was assigned a category: Cowell was given the Groups, Walsh had the Over 28s, Minogue was asked to look after the Boys and Cole was assigned the Girls.

=== Judges' houses and wildcards ===
Minogue and Cole returned to the judging panel for the judges' houses stage of the competition, where each judge mentored eight acts, increased from six in previous series. Each judge had help from a guest judge to choose their final acts. Original judge Sharon Osbourne returned to assist Walsh at Adare Manor in Adare, County Limerick, Ireland, Cole was assisted by will.i.am in Coworth Park, Ascot, Berkshire, England, Cowell by Sinitta in Marbella, Spain, and 2010 season of The X Factor Australia judge Natalie Imbruglia returned to assist Minogue in Melbourne, Australia. Contestants spent a week at judges' houses and performed two songs for their respective judge. Each judge and their guest eliminated five acts, leaving twelve remaining. The judges' houses stage was broadcast in two episodes on 2 and 3 October 2010.

==== Judges' houses performances ====
- Acts in bold advanced

Boys:

- **Nicolo: "New York"**
- Tom: "Feel"
- **Paije: "True Colors" (wildcard)**
- John: "Back for Good"
- Karl: "She Said"
- Marlon: "Empire State of Mind"
- **Matt: "If I Were a Boy"**
- **Aiden: "Cannonball"**

Over 28s:

- Stephen: "Get the Party Started"
- Yuli: "Bonkers"
- Justin: "Telephone"
- **Wagner: "You Got the Love" (wildcard)**
- **Mary: "Fix You"**
- **John: "Billionaire"**
- Elesha: "If I Ain't Got You"*
- **Storm: "Without You"**
- Elesha Moses was originally sent home, but after the judges could not decide on an eighth act to send through, she was later bought back.

Groups:

- Twem: "When Love Takes Over"
- **Belle Amie: "Faith"**
- Princes and Rouges: "Video Killed the Radio Star"
- Hustle: "Tainted Love"
- The Reason: "If You're Not The One"
- **F.Y.D: "Beggin'"**
- **Diva Fever: "Love Machine" (wildcard)**
- **One Direction: "Torn"**

Girls:

- **Rebecca: "Fireflies"**
- Gamu: "Cry Me Out"
- Annastasia: "How Could an Angel Break My Heart"
- Raquel: "Ordinary People"
- Keri: "Wake Me Up When September Ends"
- **Katie: "Smile"**
- **Treyc: "Ave Maria" (wildcard)**
- **Cher: "Cooler Than Me"**

Summary of judges' houses
Judge	Category	Location	Assistant	Acts Eliminated	Wildcards
Cole	Girls	Coworth Park, Berkshire	will.i.am	Keri Arrindell, Annastasia Baker, Gamu Nhengu, Raquel Thomas	Treyc Cohen
Cowell	Groups	Marbella	Sinitta	Husstle, Princes and Rogues, The Reason, Twem	Diva Fever
Minogue	Boys	Melbourne	Natalie Imbruglia	Karl Brown, Marlon McKenzie, Tom Richards, John Wilding	Paije Richardson
Walsh	Over 28s	Adare Manor, County Limerick	Sharon Osbourne	Stephen Hunter, Yuli Minguel, Elesha Moses, Justin Vanderhyde	Wagner

In the first live show on 9 October, Paije Richardson, Treyc Cohen, Wagner and Diva Fever were reinstated as wildcards.

== Acts ==
Key:

– Winner
– Runner-Up
Wildcard (Live Shows)

Act	Age(s)	Hometown	Category (mentor)	Result
Matt Cardle	27	Little Maplestead	Boys (Minogue)	Winner
Rebecca Ferguson	24	Liverpool	Girls (Cole)	Runner-Up
One Direction	16–18	Various	Groups (Cowell)	3rd Place
Cher Lloyd	17	Malvern	Girls (Cole)	4th Place
Mary Byrne	51	Ballyfermot, Ireland	Over 28s (Walsh)	5th Place
Wagner	53	Cradley, West Midlands	Over 28s (Walsh)	6th Place
Katie Waissel	24	Harefield	Girls (Cole)	7th Place
Paije Richardson	20	Islington	Boys (Minogue)	8th Place
Aiden Grimshaw	18	Blackpool	Boys (Minogue)	9th Place
Treyc Cohen	27	Stonydelph	Girls (Cole)	10th Place
Belle Amie	17–23	Various	Groups (Cowell)	11th Place
John Adeleye	30	Harlesden	Over 28s (Walsh)	12th Place
Diva Fever	21–26	Various	Groups (Cowell)	13th Place
Storm Lee	37	Edinburgh	Over 28s (Walsh)	14th Place
F.Y.D.	22–26	Various	Groups (Cowell)	15th Place
Nicolo Festa	21	Treviso, Italy	Boys (Minogue)	16th Place

== Live shows ==
=== Format ===
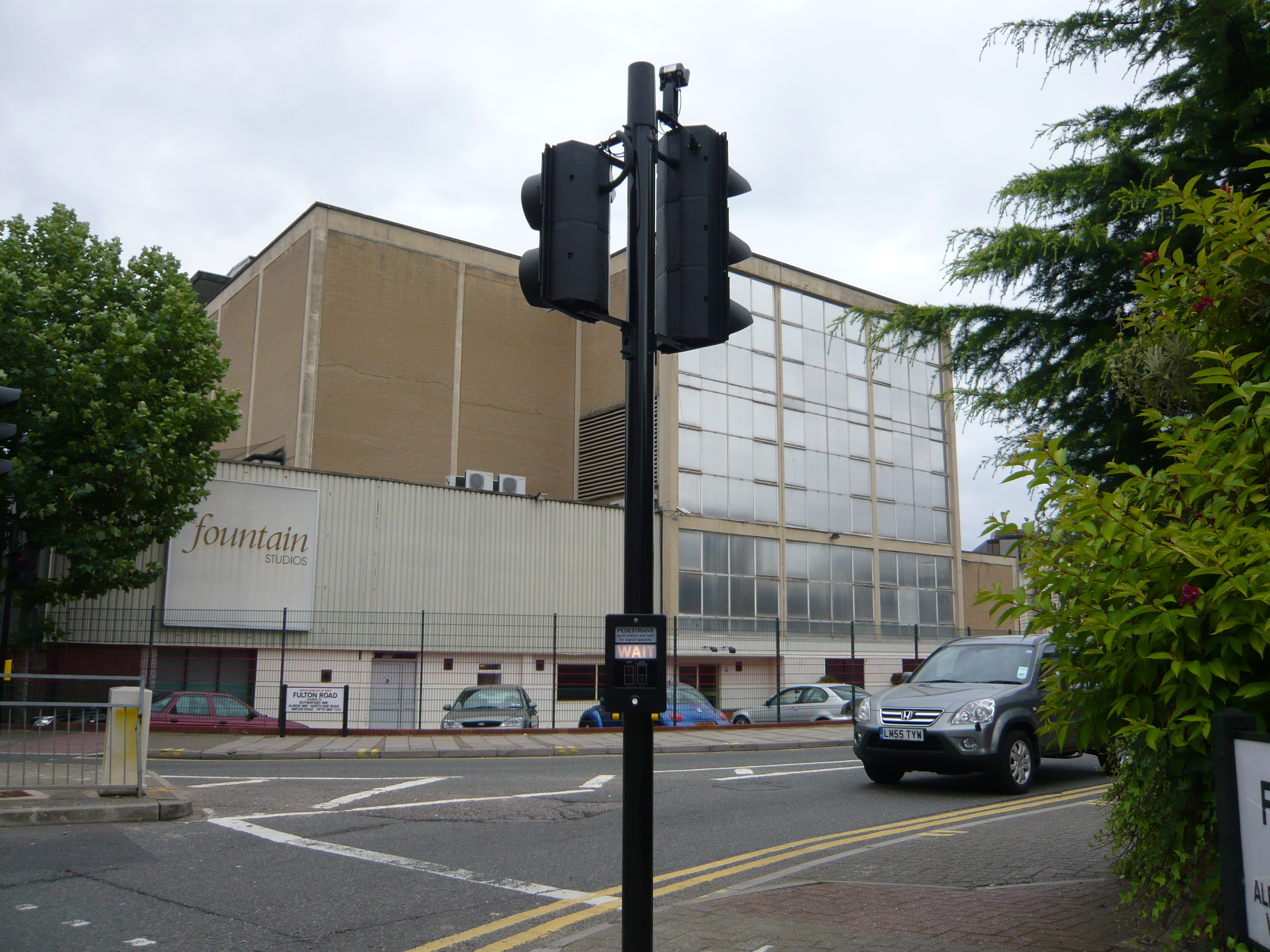
The Fountain Studios, where The X Factor and The Xtra Factor live shows took place

The live shows took place at The Fountain Studios in Wembley, northwest London. They started on 9 October 2010, with contestants performing on the Saturday night shows and the results being announced on the Sunday night shows. As previously, each week had a different song theme. The two acts with the fewest public votes were in the bottom two and sang again in the "final showdown". The songs they performed in the bottom two were of their own choice and did not necessarily follow that week's theme. The four judges then each chose one act from the bottom two that they wanted to be eliminated from the show. If each act received an equal number of judges' votes, the result went to deadlock and the act with the lowest number public votes was eliminated. The first live show was extended to two and a half hours to include a surprise twist, namely that each judge was given a wildcard, allowing them to bring back one rejected act from judges' houses, thus bringing the number of finalists up from twelve to sixteen. Owing to the addition of the wildcards, the first two results were double eliminations. The quarter-final result was also a double elimination. In the case of a double elimination, instead of the bottom two, the bottom three were announced and the act with the fewest votes was automatically eliminated. The two remaining acts from the bottom three then performed in the final showdown. Starting from the quarter-final of live shows, the acts performed two songs each on the Saturday night.

At the start of each results show, the remaining finalists performed a song as a group. However, the song was pre-recorded and the contestants mimed, because of technical issues with mixing the number of microphones. Starting this series, the contestants' live performances were made available to download from iTunes. However, the songs are not eligible to chart to protect the integrity of the contest. Viewers in Ireland were allowed vote again, having been unable to for four years.

Each results show featured a number of guest performers. Joe McElderry and Usher performed on the first live results show, and Diana Vickers and Katy Perry performed in the second week. The third results show featured performances from judge Cole and Michael Bublé. Rihanna, Bon Jovi and Jamiroquai performed in the fourth results show, and Shayne Ward and Kylie Minogue performed in the fifth week. Take That, Westlife and JLS all performed on the sixth results show, and Olly Murs performed on the seventh. The quarter-final featured performances from Justin Bieber, The Wanted and Nicole Scherzinger. The cast of Glee performed on the semi-final on 5 December, along with Alexandra Burke and The Black Eyed Peas. Rihanna performed again in the first show of the final, and Christina Aguilera also performed. Take That performed again in the second show of the final.

The final took place on 11 and 12 December, with each episode lasting two hours. During the first show, the voting lines were frozen and the fourth placed contestant was eliminated. The votes carried over and the third placed contestant left on the second show following another freeze. The final two performed the potential winner's singles before the winner was announced.

=== Results summary ===
Colour key

Act in Boys

Act in Girls

Act in Over 28s

Act in Groups

–	Act was in the bottom two/three and had to sing again in the final showdown
–	Act was in the bottom three but received the fewest votes and was immediately eliminated
–	Act received the fewest public votes and was immediately eliminated (no final showdown)
–	Act received the most public votes

Weekly results per act
Act	Week 1	Week 2	Week 3	Week 4	Week 5	Week 6	Week 7	Quarter-Final	Semi-Final	Final		
Act	Week 1	Week 2	Week 3	Week 4	Week 5	Week 6	Week 7	Quarter-Final	Semi-Final	Saturday Vote	Sunday Vote	
Act	Week 1	Week 2	Week 3	Week 4	Week 5	Week 6	Week 7	Quarter-Final	Semi-Final	Saturday Vote	First Sunday Vote	Second Sunday Vote
Matt Cardle	2nd 15.14%	1st 24.39%	1st 23.97%	1st 20.60%	1st 33.41%	1st 23.16%	1st 18.44%	1st 31.95%	1st 35.84%	1st 39.92%	1st 39.83%^{2}	Winner; 44.61%^{2}
Rebecca Ferguson	6th 6.51%	5th 7.99%	5th 8.46%	5th 9.79%	2nd 12.80%	2nd 18.24%	3rd 12.85%	2nd 13.98%	2nd 20.22%	2nd 25.71%	2nd 32.80%^{2}	Runner-Up; 38.63%^{2}
One Direction	4th 10.04%	3rd 9.84%	3rd 11.08%	4th 11.79%	3rd 12.13%	3rd 14.44%	4th 12.65%	4th 11.90%	3rd 17.38%	3rd 18.54%	3rd 20.72%^{2}	Eliminated (final)
Cher Lloyd	3rd 10.31%	6th 7.17%	4th 9.12%	2nd 19.72%	5th 7.64%	5th 8.88%	8th 8.00%	3rd 13.19%	5th 11.57%	4th 15.83%	Eliminated (final)	
Mary Byrne	1st 22.28%	2nd 18.55%	2nd 13.92%	3rd 11.98%	4th 12.02%	4th 10.66%	5th 11.97%	5th 11.29%	4th 14.99%	Eliminated (semi-final)		
Wagner	12th 1.91%	11th 2.47%	9th 4.50%	8th 4.77%	8th 4.21%	7th 6.30%	6th 9.90%	6th 10.48%	Eliminated (quarter-final)			
Katie Waissel	15th 1.55%	8th 4.30%	8th 5.95%	10th 2.73%	10th 3.22%	8th 5.29%	2nd 16.82%	7th 7.21%	Eliminated (quarter-final)			
Paije Richardson	7th 5.83%	9th 3.80%	7th 6.10%	7th 6.22%	7th 5.19%	6th 8.02%	7th 9.37%	Eliminated (week 7)				
Aiden Grimshaw	5th 9.78%	4th 8.82%	6th 6.58%	6th 6.70%	6th 5.85%	9th 5.01%	Eliminated (week 6)					
Treyc Cohen	8th 4.82%	10th 2.82%	12th 2.39%	9th 3.14%	9th 3.53%	Eliminated (week 5)						
Belle Amie	11th 2.13%	13th 1.86%	10th 4.15%	11th 2.56%	Eliminated (week 4)							
John Adeleye	9th 2.46%	7th 4.50%	11th 3.78%	Eliminated (week 3)								
Diva Fever	10th 2.28%	12th 2.05%	Eliminated (week 2)									
Storm Lee	13th 1.89%	14th 1.44%	Eliminated (week 2)									
F.Y.D.	14th 1.71%	Eliminated (week 1)										
Nicolo Festa	16th 1.36%	Eliminated (week 1)										
Final Showdown	F.Y.D., Waissel	Belle Amie, Diva Fever	Adeleye, Cohen	Belle Amie, Waissel	Cohen, Waissel	Grimshaw, Waissel	Lloyd, Richardson	Byrne, Wagner	Byrne, Lloyd	No final showdown or judges' votes: results were based on public votes alone		
Judges voted to	Eliminate								Send Through	No final showdown or judges' votes: results were based on public votes alone		
Walsh's vote (Over 28s)	F.Y.D.	Diva Fever	Cohen	Waissel	Cohen	Waissel	Richardson	Wagner	Byrne	No final showdown or judges' votes: results were based on public votes alone		
Minogue's vote (Boys)	F.Y.D.	Diva Fever	Adeleye	Belle Amie	Waissel	Waissel	Lloyd	Wagner	Lloyd	No final showdown or judges' votes: results were based on public votes alone		
Cole’s vote (Girls)	F.Y.D.	Diva Fever	Adeleye	Belle Amie	None (abstained)	Grimshaw	Richardson	Wagner	Lloyd	No final showdown or judges' votes: results were based on public votes alone		
Cowell's vote (Groups)	Waissel	N/A^{1}	Adeleye	Waissel	Cohen	Grimshaw	Richardson	N/A^{1}	Lloyd	No final showdown or judges' votes: results were based on public votes alone		
Eliminated	Nicolo Festa; 1.36% to save	Storm Lee; 1.44% to save	John Adeleye; 3 of 4 votes Majority	Belle Amie; 2 of 4 votes Deadlock	Treyc Cohen; 2 of 3 votes Majority	Aiden Grimshaw; 2 of 4 votes Deadlock	Paije Richardson; 3 of 4 votes Majority	Katie Waissel; 7.21% to save	Mary Byrne; 1 of 4 votes Minority	Cher Lloyd; 15.83% to save	One Direction; 20.72% to save	Rebecca Ferguson; 38.63% to win
Eliminated	F.Y.D. 3 of 4 votes Majority	Diva Fever; 3 of 3 votes Majority	John Adeleye; 3 of 4 votes Majority	Belle Amie; 2 of 4 votes Deadlock	Treyc Cohen; 2 of 3 votes Majority	Aiden Grimshaw; 2 of 4 votes Deadlock	Paije Richardson; 3 of 4 votes Majority	Wagner; 3 of 3 votes Majority	Mary Byrne; 1 of 4 votes Minority	Cher Lloyd; 15.83% to save	One Direction; 20.72% to save	Rebecca Ferguson; 38.63% to win
Reference(s)												

- ^1 Cowell was not required to vote as there was already a majority. However, in the quarter-final, he stated that he would have voted to eliminate Wagner.
- ^2 The voting percentages in the final for both Sunday Votes do not add up to 100%, owing to the freezing of votes. Cher Lloyd received 6.65% of the vote at the second freeze, and 4.07% of the final vote. One Direction received 12.69% of the final vote.

=== Live show details ===
==== Week 1 (9/10 October) ====
- Theme: Number-one singles
- Group performance: "The Rhythm of the Night"
- Musical guests: Usher ("DJ Got Us Fallin' in Love" / "OMG") and Joe McElderry ("Ambitions")
- Best bits songs: "Grace Kelly" (Nicolo Festa) & "Superman (It's Not Easy)" (F.Y.D.)

Acts' performances on the first live show
Act	Category (mentor)	Order	Song	Result
F.Y.D.	Groups (Cowell)	1	"Billionaire"	Bottom Three
Matt Cardle	Boys (Minogue)	2	"When Love Takes Over"	Safe
John Adeleye	Over 28s (Walsh)	3	"One Sweet Day"	Safe
Rebecca Ferguson	Girls (Cole)	4	"Teardrops"	Safe
Storm Lee	Over 28s (Walsh)	5	"We Built This City"	Safe
Belle Amie	Groups (Cowell)	6	"Airplanes"	Safe
Cher Lloyd	Girls (Cole)	7	"Just Be Good to Me"	Safe
Diva Fever	Groups (Cowell)	8	"Sunny"	Safe
Paije Richardson	Boys (Minogue)	9	"Killing Me Softly"	Safe
Katie Waissel	Girls (Cole)	10	"We Are the Champions"	Bottom Three
Mary Byrne	Over 28s (Walsh)	11	"It's a Man's Man's Man's World"	Safe (Highest Votes)
Nicolo Festa	Boys (Minogue)	12	"Just Dance"	Eliminated
One Direction	Groups (Cowell)	13	"Viva la Vida"	Safe
Wagner	Over 28s (Walsh)	14	"She Bangs"/"Love Shack"	Safe
Aiden Grimshaw	Boys (Minogue)	15	"Mad World"	Safe
Treyc Cohen	Girls (Cole)	16	"One"	Safe
Final showdown details
F.Y.D.	Groups (Cowell)	1	"Don't Stop the Music"	Eliminated
Katie Waissel	Girls (Cole)	2	"Don't Let Me Down"	Saved

- Owing to the addition of four wildcard acts, two acts were eliminated from the series' first results show. The three acts with the fewest votes were announced as the bottom three and the act with the fewest public votes was then automatically eliminated. The remaining two acts then performed in the final showdown for the judges' votes. Nicolo Festa was eliminated as the act with the fewest public votes.

Judges' votes to eliminate

- Cowell: Katie Waissel – backed his own act, F.Y.D.
- Cole: F.Y.D. – based on the final showdown performance, effectively backing her own act, Katie Waissel.
- Minogue: F.Y.D. – based on the final showdown performances.
- Walsh: F.Y.D. – stated that he had to choose the act with more potential, as well as "the right" act.

However, voting statistics revealed that F.Y.D received more votes than Waissel, which meant that if Walsh sent the result to deadlock, F.Y.D would have been saved.

==== Week 2 (16/17 October) ====
- Theme: Musical Heroes
- Group performance: "Telephone"
- Musical guests: Diana Vickers ("My Wicked Heart") and Katy Perry ("Firework")
- Best bits songs: "Sweet Child o' Mine" (Storm Lee) & "Take Your Mama" (Diva Fever)

Acts' performances on the second live show
Act	Category (mentor)	Order	Song	Musical Hero	Result
Storm Lee	Over 28s (Walsh)	1	"Born to Run"	Bruce Springsteen	Eliminated
Treyc Cohen	Girls (Cole)	2	"Purple Rain"	Prince	Safe
Paije Richardson	Boys (Minogue)	3	"If I Ain't Got You"	Alicia Keys	Safe
One Direction	Groups (Cowell)	4	"My Life Would Suck Without You"	Kelly Clarkson	Safe
Cher Lloyd	Girls (Cole)	5	"Hard Knock Life (Ghetto Anthem)"	Jay-Z	Safe
John Adeleye	Over 28s (Walsh)	6	"A Song for You"	Donny Hathaway	Safe
Diva Fever	Groups (Cowell)	7	"Gotta Go Home" / "Barbra Streisand"	Boney M.	Bottom Three
Rebecca Ferguson	Girls (Cole)	8	"Feeling Good"	Nina Simone	Safe
Aiden Grimshaw	Boys (Minogue)	9	"Jealous Guy"	John Lennon	Safe
Wagner	Over 28s (Walsh)	10	"Help Yourself"	Tom Jones	Safe
Katie Waissel	Girls (Cole)	11	"I'd Rather Go Blind"	Etta James	Safe
Belle Amie	Groups (Cowell)	12	"You Really Got Me"	The Kinks	Bottom Three
Mary Byrne	Over 28s (Walsh)	13	"You Don't Have to Say You Love Me"	Dusty Springfield	Safe
Matt Cardle	Boys (Minogue)	14	"Just the Way You Are"	Bruno Mars	Safe (Highest Votes)
Final showdown details
Diva Fever	Groups (Cowell)	1	"I Will Survive"		Eliminated
Belle Amie	Groups (Cowell)	2	"Big Girls Don't Cry"		Saved

- Owing to the addition of four wildcard acts, two acts were eliminated from the series' second results show. The three acts with the fewest public votes were announced as the bottom three and then the act with the fewest votes was automatically eliminated. The remaining two acts then performed in the final showdown for the judges' votes. Storm Lee was eliminated as the act with the fewest public votes.

Judges' votes to eliminate

- Walsh: Diva Fever – thought Belle Amie would get better in the competition.
- Minogue: Diva Fever – based on the final showdown performances.
- Cole: Diva Fever – gave no reason.
- Cowell was not required to vote as there was already a majority; he refused to say how he would have voted as both acts were in his category.

However, voting statistics revealed that Diva Fever received more votes than Belle Amie which meant that if the result went to deadlock, Diva Fever would have been saved.

==== Week 3 (23/24 October) ====
- Theme: Guilty pleasures
- Group performance: "Forget You"
- Musical guests: Michael Bublé ("Hollywood") and Cheryl Cole ("Promise This")
- Best bits song: "You Give Me Something"

Acts' performances on the third live show
Act	Category (mentor)	Order	Song	Guilty Pleasure	Result
Paije Richardson	Boys (Minogue)	1	"Ain't Nobody"	Chaka Khan	Safe
John Adeleye	Over 28s (Walsh)	2	"Zoom"	Fat Larry’s Band	Bottom Two
Rebecca Ferguson	Girls (Cole)	3	"Why Don't You Do Right?"	Peggy Lee	Safe
Cher Lloyd	Girls (Cole)	4	"No Diggity"/"Shout"	Blackstreet / Tears for Fears	Safe
Matt Cardle	Boys (Minogue)	5	"...Baby One More Time"	Britney Spears	Safe (Highest Votes)
One Direction	Groups (Cowell)	6	"Nobody Knows"	Pink	Safe
Treyc Cohen	Girls (Cole)	7	"Whole Lotta Love"	Led Zeppelin	Bottom Two
Mary Byrne	Over 28s (Walsh)	8	"I (Who Have Nothing)"	Ben E. King	Safe
Aiden Grimshaw	Boys (Minogue)	9	"Diamonds Are Forever"	Shirley Bassey	Safe
Belle Amie	Groups (Cowell)	10	"I'll Stand by You"	The Pretenders	Safe
Wagner	Over 28s (Walsh)	11	"Spice Up Your Life"/"Livin' la Vida Loca"	Spice Girls / Ricky Martin	Safe
Katie Waissel	Girls (Cole)	12	"I Wan'na Be Like You"	Louis Prima	Safe
Final showdown details
John Adeleye	Over 28s (Walsh)	1	"Because of You"		Eliminated
Treyc Cohen	Girls (Cole)	2	"One Night Only"		Saved

Judges' votes to eliminate

- Walsh: Treyc Cohen – backed his own act, John Adeleye, whom he said had potential at growth in the competition.
- Minogue: John Adeleye – based on the final showdown performances, also stating that she knew what she would see in Adeleye's future.
- Cole: John Adeleye – backed her own act, Treyc Cohen.
- Cowell: John Adeleye – based on the final showdown performances, stating that Adeleye was not improving as much as Cohen.

However, voting statistics revealed that Adeleye received more votes than Cohen which meant that if Cowell sent the result to deadlock, Adeleye would have been saved.

==== Week 4 (30/31 October) ====
- Theme: Halloween
- Group performance: "Livin' on a Prayer" (with Bon Jovi)
- Musical guests: Bon Jovi with finalists ("Livin' on a Prayer"), Jamiroquai ("White Knuckle Ride") and Rihanna ("Only Girl (In the World)")
- Best bits song: "Issues"

Acts' performances on the fourth live show
Act	Category (mentor)	Order	Song	Result
Mary Byrne	Over 28s (Walsh)	1	"Could It Be Magic"	Safe
Aiden Grimshaw	Boys (Minogue)	2	"Thriller"	Safe
Belle Amie	Groups (Cowell)	3	"Venus"	Bottom Two
Rebecca Ferguson	Girls (Cole)	4	"Wicked Game"	Safe
Treyc Cohen	Girls (Cole)	5	"Relight My Fire"	Safe
Matt Cardle	Boys (Minogue)	6	"Bleeding Love"	Safe (Highest Votes)
Wagner	Over 28s (Walsh)	7	"O Fortuna"/"Bat Out of Hell"	Safe
Paije Richardson	Boys (Minogue)	8	"Back to Black"	Safe
Katie Waissel	Girls (Cole)	9	"Bewitched"	Bottom Two
One Direction	Groups (Cowell)	10	"Total Eclipse of the Heart"	Safe
Cher Lloyd	Girls (Cole)	11	"Stay"	Safe
Final showdown details
Belle Amie	Groups (Cowell)	1	"Breakaway"	Eliminated
Katie Waissel	Girls (Cole)	2	"Trust in Me"	Saved

Judges' votes to eliminate

- Cowell: Katie Waissel – backed his own act, Belle Amie.
- Cole: Belle Amie – backed her own act, Katie Waissel.
- Minogue: Belle Amie – based on the final showdown performances.
- Walsh: Katie Waissel – gave no reason; though he later stated on The Xtra Factor that he could not decide and sent the result to deadlock.

With the acts in the bottom two receiving two votes each, the result went to deadlock and reverted to the earlier public vote. Belle Amie were eliminated as the act with the fewest public votes.

==== Week 5 (6/7 November) ====
- Theme: American Anthems
- Group performance: "So What"
- Musical guests: Shayne Ward ("Gotta Be Somebody") and Kylie Minogue ("Better than Today")
- Best bits song: "Happy"

Acts' performances on the fifth live show
Act	Category (mentor)	Order	Song	American Artist	Result
Cher Lloyd	Girls (Cole)	1	"Empire State of Mind"	Alicia Keys	Safe
Mary Byrne	Over 28s (Walsh)	2	"There You'll Be"	Faith Hill	Safe
Katie Waissel	Girls (Cole)	3	"Don't Speak"	No Doubt	Bottom Two
Aiden Grimshaw	Boys (Minogue)	4	"Nothing Compares 2 U"	Prince	Safe
Paije Richardson	Boys (Minogue)	5	"I'm a Believer"/"Hey Ya!"	The Monkees/Outkast	Safe
Rebecca Ferguson	Girls (Cole)	6	"Make You Feel My Love"	Bob Dylan	Safe
Wagner	Over 28s (Walsh)	7	"Viva Las Vegas"/"The Wonder of You"	Elvis Presley	Safe
Matt Cardle	Boys (Minogue)	8	"The First Time Ever I Saw Your Face"	Roberta Flack	Safe (Highest Votes)
Treyc Cohen	Girls (Cole)	9	"I Don't Want to Miss a Thing"	Aerosmith	Bottom Two
One Direction	Groups (Cowell)	10	"Kids in America"	N/A	Safe
Final showdown details
Katie Waissel	Girls (Cole)	1	"Don't Give Up on Me"		Saved
Treyc Cohen	Girls (Cole)	2	"Un-Break My Heart"		Eliminated

Judges' votes to eliminate

- Cowell: Treyc Cohen – based on who he would prefer to see again the following week.
- Cole refused to vote off either of her acts; she asked O'Leary to have her vote after Minogue and Walsh to send the result to deadlock, however, O'Leary then announced the result would be determined by a majority vote by the other three judges.
- Minogue: Katie Waissel – gave no reason although said both acts sung better under pressure.
- Walsh: Treyc Cohen – stated that he would follow his heart and save Waissel.

However, voting statistics revealed that Cohen received more votes than Waissel which meant that if the result went to deadlock, Cohen would have been saved.

==== Week 6 (13/14 November) ====
- Theme: Songs by Elton John
- Group performance: "Can't Stop Moving"
- Musical guests: JLS ("Love You More"), Westlife ("Safe") and Take That ("The Flood")
- Best bits song: "What If"

Acts' performances on the sixth live show
Act	Category (mentor)	Order	Song	Result
Paije Richardson	Boys (Minogue)	1	"Crocodile Rock"	Safe
Aiden Grimshaw	Boys (Minogue)	2	"Rocket Man"	Bottom Two
Mary Byrne	Over 28s (Walsh)	3	"Can You Feel the Love Tonight"	Safe
Katie Waissel	Girls (Cole)	4	"Saturday Night's Alright for Fighting"	Bottom Two
Matt Cardle	Boys (Minogue)	5	"Goodbye Yellow Brick Road"	Safe (Highest Votes)
Cher Lloyd	Girls (Cole)	6	"Sorry Seems to Be the Hardest Word"/"Mockingbird"	Safe
Wagner	Over 28s (Walsh)	7	"I'm Still Standing"/"Circle of Life"	Safe
One Direction	Groups (Cowell)	8	"Something About the Way You Look Tonight"	Safe
Rebecca Ferguson	Girls (Cole)	9	"Candle in the Wind"	Safe
Final showdown details
Aiden Grimshaw	Boys (Minogue)	1	"Don't Dream It's Over"	Eliminated
Katie Waissel	Girls (Cole)	2	"Save Me from Myself"	Saved

Judges' votes to eliminate

- Cowell: Aiden Grimshaw – gave no reason; though he later stated on The Xtra Factor that he wanted to back Waissel for persevering in the competition every week.
- Cole: Aiden Grimshaw – backed her own act, Katie Waissel.
- Minogue: Katie Waissel – gave no reason, though effectively backed her own act, Aiden Grimshaw.
- Walsh: Katie Waissel – felt Grimshaw had more potential.

With the acts in the bottom two receiving two votes each, the result went to deadlock and reverted to the earlier public vote. Grimshaw was eliminated as the act with the fewest public votes.

==== Week 7 (20/21 November) ====
- Theme: Songs by The Beatles
- Group performance: "Heroes" (all finalists)
- Musical guest: Olly Murs ("Thinking of Me")
- Best bits song: "Make You Feel My Love"

Acts' performances on the seventh live show
Act	Category (mentor)	Order	Song	Result
Matt Cardle	Boys (Minogue)	1	"Come Together"	Safe (Highest Votes)
Cher Lloyd	Girls (Cole)	2	"Imagine"	Bottom Two
One Direction	Groups (Cowell)	3	"All You Need Is Love"	Safe
Rebecca Ferguson	Girls (Cole)	4	"Yesterday"	Safe
Mary Byrne	Over 28s (Walsh)	5	"Something"	Safe
Paije Richardson	Boys (Minogue)	6	"Let It Be"	Bottom Two
Wagner	Over 28s (Walsh)	7	"Get Back"/"Hippy Hippy Shake"/"Hey Jude"	Safe
Katie Waissel	Girls (Cole)	8	"Help!"	Safe
Final showdown details
Paije Richardson	Boys (Minogue)	1	"Stop!"	Eliminated
Cher Lloyd	Girls (Cole)	2	"Stay"	Saved

Judges' votes to eliminate

- Cowell: Paije Richardson – said he would want to back Lloyd whom he had continually supported, though he stated that both acts did not deserve to be in the final showdown.
- Cole: Paije Richardson – backed her own act, Cher Lloyd, though agreed with Cowell that neither act deserved to be in the final showdown.
- Minogue: Cher Lloyd – backed her own act, Paije Richardson, whom she stated deserved his place in the competition, though also agreed with Cowell and Cole that neither act deserved to be in the final showdown.
- Walsh: Paije Richardson – gave no reason, though he later stated on The Xtra Factor that Lloyd had performed better in the final showdown.

However, voting statistics revealed that Richardson received more votes than Lloyd which meant that if Walsh sent the result to deadlock, Richardson would have advanced to the quarter-final and Lloyd would have been eliminated.

==== Week 8: Quarter-Final (27/28 November) ====
- Theme: Rock
- Musical guests: The Wanted ("Lose My Mind"), Justin Bieber ("Somebody to Love" / "Baby") and Nicole Scherzinger ("Poison")
- Best bits songs: "Lucky Star" (Katie Waissel) & "Can't Take My Eyes Off You" (Wagner)

For the first time this series, each act performed two songs.

Acts' performances in the quarter-final
Act	Category (mentor)	Order	First song	First Rock Artist	Order	Second song	Second Rock Artist	Result
Wagner	Over 28s (Walsh)	1	"Creep"	Radiohead	8	"Addicted to Love"	Robert Palmer	Bottom Three
One Direction	Groups (Cowell)	2	"Summer of '69"	Bryan Adams	9	"You Are So Beautiful"	Joe Cocker	Safe
Mary Byrne	Over 28s (Walsh)	3	"All I Want Is You"	U2	10	"Brass in Pocket"	The Pretenders	Bottom Three
Cher Lloyd	Girls (Cole)	4	"Girlfriend"	Avril Lavigne	14	"Walk This Way"	Run-DMC	Safe
Rebecca Ferguson	Girls (Cole)	5	"I Still Haven't Found What I'm Looking For"	U2	12	"(I Can't Get No) Satisfaction"	The Rolling Stones	Safe
Matt Cardle	Boys (Minogue)	6	"I Love Rock 'n' Roll"	Joan Jett and the Blackhearts	13	"Nights in White Satin"	The Moody Blues	Safe (Highest Votes)
Katie Waissel	Girls (Cole)	7	"Sex on Fire"	Kings of Leon	11	"Everybody Hurts"	R.E.M	Eliminated
Final showdown details
Wagner	Over 28s (Walsh)	1	"Unforgettable"					Eliminated
Mary Byrne	Over 28s (Walsh)	2	"This Is My Life"					Saved

- Two acts were eliminated from the series' eighth results show. The three acts with the fewest votes were announced as the bottom three and then the act with the fewest votes was automatically eliminated. The remaining two acts then performed in the final showdown for the judges' votes. Katie Waissel was eliminated as the act with the fewest public votes.

Judges' votes to eliminate

- Walsh: Wagner – based on the final showdown performances.
- Minogue: Wagner – backed Byrne who she thought was the better singer.
- Cole: Wagner – gave no reason.
- Cowell was not required to vote as there was already a majority, but said that he would have voted to eliminate Wagner as he wanted to return the show to being a talent competition.

==== Week 9: Semi-Final (4/5 December) ====
- Themes: Club classics; "songs to get you to the final" (no theme)
- Musical guests: Alexandra Burke ("The Silence"), Glee Cast ("Don't Stop Believin'") and The Black Eyed Peas ("The Time (Dirty Bit)")
- Best bits song: "The Garden"

Acts' performances in the semi-final
Act	Category (mentor)	Order	First song	Order	Second song	Result
Rebecca Ferguson	Girls (Cole)	1	"Show Me Love"	9	"Amazing Grace"	Safe
Mary Byrne	Over 28s (Walsh)	2	"Never Can Say Goodbye"	7	"The Way We Were"	Bottom Two
Matt Cardle	Boys (Minogue)	3	"You Got the Love"	6	"She's Always a Woman"	Safe (Highest Votes)
Cher Lloyd	Girls (Cole)	4	"Nothin' on You"	8	"Love the Way You Lie"	Bottom Two
One Direction	Groups (Cowell)	5	"Only Girl (In the World)"	10	"Chasing Cars"	Safe
Final showdown details
Mary Byrne	Over 28s (Walsh)	1	"It's a Man's Man's Man's World"			Eliminated
Cher Lloyd	Girls (Cole)	2	"Everytime"			Saved

For the first time in The X Factor history, the judges chose which act they wanted to see progress to the final.

Judges' votes to send through to the final

- Walsh: Mary Byrne – backed his own act, Mary Byrne.
- Minogue: Cher Lloyd – thought Lloyd’s performance was emotional but also acknowledged that both acts did "an incredible performance" and were "great contestants in the show".
- Cole: Cher Lloyd – backed her own act, Cher Lloyd.
- Cowell: Cher Lloyd – gave no reason although he praised Byrne as a contestant and singer as well as Lloyd's final showdown performance.

However, voting statistics revealed than Byrne received more votes than Lloyd which meant that if Cowell sent the result to deadlock, Byrne would have advanced to the final and Lloyd would have been eliminated.

==== Week 10: Final (11/12 December) ====
11 December

- Themes: No theme; celebrity duets
- Group performance: "Flashdance... What a Feeling" (all contestants)
- Musical guests: Rihanna ("What's My Name?") and Christina Aguilera ("Express")
- Best bits song: "Halo"

Acts' performances on the Saturday Final
Act	Category (mentor)	Order	First song	Order	Second song	Duet Partner	Result
Matt Cardle	Boys (Minogue)	1	"Here with Me"	5	"Unfaithful"	Rihanna	Safe (Highest Votes)
Rebecca Ferguson	Girls (Cole)	2	"Like a Star"	6	"Beautiful"	Christina Aguilera	Safe
One Direction	Groups (Cowell)	3	"Your Song"	7	"She's the One"	Robbie Williams	Safe
Cher Lloyd	Girls (Cole)	4	"The Clapping Song"/"Get Ur Freak On"	8	"Where Is the Love?"/"I Gotta Feeling"	will.i.am	Eliminated

12 December

- Themes: No theme; winner's single
- Group performances: "Never Forget" (with Take That) and "Bad Romance" (auditionees)
- Musical guest: Take That ("Never Forget" with contestants and "The Flood")
- Best bits songs: "Baby" (One Direction), "The Voice Within" (Rebecca Ferguson) & "Cannonball" (Matt Cardle)

Acts' performances on the Sunday Final
Act	Category (mentor)	Order	First song	Order	Second song	Result
Matt Cardle	Boys (Minogue)	1	"Firework"	4	"When We Collide"	Winner
One Direction	Groups (Cowell)	2	"Torn"	N/A (Already Eliminated)		Eliminated
Rebecca Ferguson	Girls (Cole)	3	"Sweet Dreams (Are Made of This)"	5	"Distant Dreamer"	Runner-Up

== Charity single ==
The series 7 finalists recorded a cover of David Bowie's 1977 song "Heroes" as a charity single in aid of Help for Heroes, a charity which supports injured servicemen and women. The song was recorded in the week beginning 18 October 2010. The video for the single was filmed on 2 November at Three Mills Studios. All sixteen finalists performed the song on 20 November's results show. It was the third year in a row that finalists have released a charity record. The single entered both the Irish Singles Chart on 25 November 2010 and the UK Singles Chart on 28 November 2010 at number 1.

== Winner's single ==
It was reported on 2 December 2010 by the Daily Mirror that the top four contestants, Matt Cardle, Cher Lloyd, One Direction and Rebecca Ferguson, would each record a different song, rather than the same song as in previous series, for their potential debut single. The change was made after Cowell reportedly increased the budget as he wanted songs to suit each act. It was reported on 10 December that Cardle's song would be "Many of Horror", Lloyd's would be "Impossible", Ferguson's would be "Distant Dreamer" and One Direction's song would be "Forever Young". Cardle and Ferguson performed their songs in the final as the last two remaining acts and upon Cardle's winning the contest, his version of "Many of Horror", renamed to "When We Collide", was released. It entered both the UK and Ireland Singles Charts at number 1.

== Voting, revenue and sponsors ==
Over the course of the live shows, 15,488,019 votes were cast. Votes made via landline telephones or from the Red Button service cost 35 pence each, with calls made from mobile telephones expected to be more expensive. The votes brought in revenue of more than £5.4 million, though it was expected to be a lot higher because of the unknown cost of mobile phone votes. Proceeds were split between production company Syco, co-producer FremantleMedia, broadcaster ITV and phone vote operator Harvest Media. Advertising slots during the final were sold for up to £250,000, which expected to bring in a further £25 million in advertising revenues, with the number of commercial breaks increased from five to six.

For the second year in a row, The X Factor was sponsored by TalkTalk, as part of a three-year sponsorship deal thought to be worth £20 million, including sponsorship of the show, the 2011 live tour and rights to online clips. TalkTalk enlisted that series 6 contestants John & Edward to launch its interactive initiative on 17 August 2010. Viewers were invited to record a video of themselves performing karaoke in front of a TalkTalk bright lights backdrop, and clips were screened as part of TalkTalk's sponsorship break bumpers. In Ireland, where the series was broadcast on TV3, The X Factor was sponsored by Domino's Pizza.

== Reception ==
=== Ratings ===
The first episode on 21 August attracted 11.88 million viewers on ITV1, the highest ever ratings for a series premiere of The X Factor. It was watched by 46.5% of television viewers during its original broadcast. The episode also received ratings of 568,000 on ITV1 HD. The first live performance show on 9 October 2010 gained 12.62 million viewers, attaining a 48.5% share of the audience during broadcast. The final result on 12 December was the highest rated episode with 16.55 million viewers on ITV1, a 51.5% audience share and 1.16 million viewers on ITV1 HD. It peaked at 19.4 million (18.14 million on ITV1 and 1.3 million on ITV1 HD) and was the highest rated television episode of 2010 in the UK. Official ratings concluded that the series averaged 14.13 million (including HD), making it the most watched series in the show's history. The series dominated the weekly rankings, taking up the top position for the first four weeks, then the top two positions until the final.

Episode	Date	Official ITV1 rating (millions)	Weekly rank	Share (%)	Official ITV1 HD rating (millions)	Total viewers (millions)
Auditions 1	21 August	11.88	1	48.6	0.57	12.45
Auditions 2	28 August	10.81	1	44.9	0.55	11.36
Auditions 3	4 September	11.69	1	49.2	0.64	12.33
Auditions 4	11 September	11.78	1	45.0	0.56	12.34
Auditions 5	18 September	11.65	2	46.0	0.68	12.33
Auditions 6	19 September	12.15	1	42.8	0.71	12.86
Bootcamp 1	25 September	12.08	2	46.4	0.72	12.80
Bootcamp 2	26 September	13.26	1	44.4	0.82	14.08
Judges' houses 1	2 October	12.68	2	47.3	0.82	13.50
Judges' houses 2	3 October	14.51	1	48.5	0.90	15.41
Live show 1	9 October	12.62	2	48.5	0.91	13.53
Results 1	10 October	13.17	1	46.3	0.90	14.07
Live show 2	16 October	12.14	2	47.2	0.97	13.11
Results 2	17 October	13.42	1	46.7	0.90	14.32
Live show 3	23 October	12.39	2	47.5	0.95	13.34
Results 3	24 October	13.73	1	47.7	0.95	14.68
Live show 4	30 October	12.70	2	47.1	0.81	13.51
Results 4	31 October	13.74	1	47.5	0.93	14.67
Live show 5	6 November	12.50	2	47.7	1.11	13.61
Results 5	7 November	14.29	1	49.7	1.07	15.36
Live show 6	13 November	13.61	2	49.9	0.99	14.60
Results 6	14 November	14.69	1	47.7	1.06	15.75
Live show 7	20 November	13.29	2	48.7	1.13	14.42
Results 7	21 November	15.04	1	50.0	1.09	16.13
Live show 8	27 November	13.57	2	49.0	1.09	14.66
Results 8	28 November	14.42	1	48.7	1.05	15.47
Live show 9	4 December	13.73	2	48.4	1.22	14.95
Results 9	5 December	14.53	1	48.6	0.99	15.52
Final part 1	11 December	13.94	2	52.6	1.17	15.11
Final part 2	12 December	16.55	1	54.9	1.16	17.71
Series average	2010	13.22	—N/a	47.9	0.91	14.13

== Controversies and criticism ==
The seventh series of The X Factor sparked several heated controversies, with over 5,000 complaints registered with Ofcom throughout the series. A spokesperson told the Daily Mirror newspaper that ITV bosses were worried about the number of complaints as claims that the show had become "seedy and oversexed" and accusations of fixing would tarnish the image of the show and ITV.

=== Contestants ===
On 25 August, it was announced that contestant Shirlena Johnson had been asked to leave the show because of concerns over her mental health. Producers said the medical report from her general practitioner, requested during bootcamp, arrived late. A spokesperson said, "The welfare of contestants is of paramount importance, and for this reason it has been agreed that Shirlena Johnson should not continue in the competition."

The decision to form two groups, Belle Amie and One Direction, from soloists at the end of the bootcamp stage was branded unfair by some of the other groups, as neither had entered the competition as groups. The controversy deepened after Cowell put through both Belle Amie and One Direction and picked just one of the original applicants.

More controversy erupted after the News of the World reported that after failing to qualify in 2009, Treyc Cohen signed a management deal with Artimis Music Management Ltd that landed her a recording contract in October that year with Birmingham-based Ajoupa Records and she released a single entitled "A Time to Be Heard". The rules of The X Factor strictly forbid record deals while a contestant is on the show. According to the newspaper, The X Factor was attempting to release Cohen from her management deal and remove the single from sale. Katie Waissel also had to be released from a contract in the United States after her audition.

=== Judges' actions ===
Controversy was caused when Cole chose not to send popular contestant Gamu Nhengu through to the live shows. Nhengu was an early favourite to win and many viewers were upset that Katie Waissel and Cher Lloyd were put through despite stumbling through their performances at judges' houses. Around 1,000 people complained to ITV and by 7 October 220,000 had joined a Facebook page called "Gamu Should Have Got Through". Cole reportedly became the target of death threats, and took extra security precautions in her home as well as at The X Factor. Bookmaker Paddy Power were forced to give odds on Nhengu winning the show after a large number of bets were placed, and made her the favourite to win, but all punters had their losing bets refunded when Nhengu was not chosen as Cole's wildcard. There was speculation that Cole was pressured by producers to eliminate Nhengu over issues with her visa, but Cole denied those claims, saying it was entirely down to her "gut instinct" and that she believed Lloyd, Waissel and Rebecca Ferguson were the best singers in her category. Later in her 2012 autobiography Cheryl: My Story, Cole confessed that the reason she had chosen Waissel for the live shows was because "[Cowell] had spent the past two years drumming into me that we needed acts who would be 'good TV.'" and that she felt Waissel had "the character and drive it took to withstand the pressure of the show." In 2014, during the special The X Factor: Cheryl Looks Back, Cole revealed that during her deliberations during judges' houses, she called Cowell, who strongly urged her not to put Lloyd through to the live shows, though stated that she refused to give up on Lloyd in the end.

Hundreds of viewers complained when, in week 5 of the live shows, Cole abstained from voting against either of her acts who she mentored in the bottom two (Cohen and Waissel) and was not allowed to vote last to send the result to deadlock. When the time came for the judges to determine the result, Cowell was asked to vote first and voted against Cohen. However, O'Leary then asked Cole to vote second rather than last which traditionally occurs when a judge has two of their own acts in the sing-off. Cole stated that she wanted to abstain from voting. When O'Leary asked her to clarify what she meant, Cole responded that she was abstaining at that moment but wanted O'Leary to ask Minogue and Walsh to cast their votes then ask Cole again where she would vote last and send the result to deadlock which is how a judge with two acts they mentor in the sing-off would vote when voting last. Due to Cole abstaining from voting against Cohen or Waissel when she was asked second, she was not allowed to send the result to deadlock. A spokesperson for The X Factor explained: "A judge can abstain from placing a vote. Cheryl made it clear that she would not send anyone home and therefore abstained from voting. Dermot went back to her to clarify that it was going to go to a majority vote if she did that. Cheryl was unable to take the vote to deadlock as deadlock requires a valid active vote." O'Leary revealed that during the previous commercial break, when the bottom two was known to the producers, they realised that Cole might abstain and decided that if she did, the result would be decided by a majority vote. After the series ended, voting statistics showed that Cohen received more votes than Waissel, meaning if Cole was allowed to send the result to deadlock, Cohen would have been saved.

=== Accusations of fixing ===
After O'Leary's revelation that producers had rehearsed what would happen if Cole abstained in week 5, allegations were made that the result was rigged to save Waissel, on the producers' assumption that her outlandish performances and growing unpopularity with the public resulted in better ratings and sensational press reports and article releases for the show. One of the assumptions that viewers believed was part of the presumed rigging was to not have Cole vote last and stop the result from going to deadlock. Cowell denied this claim, saying he would never want to defraud viewers and said the situation had "been blown out of proportion". O'Leary defended himself and the show on Twitter, saying "We never know which way the judges are going to vote. Ever. The only thing I know is who's in the bottom two when I'm given the card. I don't know which judge to go to until I'm called and the judges, including [Cowell], don't know the vote or who we're coming to next. It's that simple." The following week, Heat magazine printed a report claiming that Cowell was aware of the public votes before the judges cast their votes, and several other media reports contained rumours of the show being fixed. The X Factor's bosses instructed their lawyers to file a formal complaint to the Press Complaints Commission against Heat, saying that the article was a lie, that very few people know the actual public voting results and conspiracy theories being printed in the media are "total and utter rubbish". Heat printed an apology in their 1 January 2011 issue and accepted that Cowell was unaware of the public votes cast until after the final.

There were accusations from viewers of fixing during the semi-final when O'Leary announced that only the public's votes would decide which acts would advance to the final, but the next day in the semi-final result show, this was changed and there was a final showdown. The show's official website also stated that the result would be decided by the public vote, and Walsh confirmed that on a radio show earlier in the week. It was the first time in the show's history that the judges were given a vote in a semi-final. Cowell (incorrectly) said that "There has always been a sing-off when there are five people left in the competition. This is a lot of nonsense about nothing." However, semi-finalist, Mary Byrne said she believed the result would be solely down to the public until the day of the semi-final performances in which the next day, she ended up in the final showdown with Cher Lloyd. She claimed that Cowell really wanted Lloyd in the final because of Cowell constantly praising Lloyd's performances, Lloyd as an artist, and Lloyd having a high likability from Cowell throughout the live shows and Byrne to be voted out because she believed that Cowell thought that Byrne's primary genre of music of easy listening as an artist, was too different among the other semi-finalists and old-fashioned compared to the more modern mainstream music. Public supporters of Byrne also felt that their votes to vote Byrne into the final were wasted and demanded refunds for their votes as they along with the viewers were not notified of the final showdown until the conclusion of the semi-final result show and due to the result not being decided by the public vote as Byrne was voted out by the judges. Byrne, viewers and Byrne supporters believed that at Cowell's and other executive producers' behest, the final showdown was put in place by producers who scrambled at the last minute, (just before the result announcement, more specifically, right after the semi-final public voting period closed and when the votes were being counted), only to prevent Byrne from having a place in the final and guarantee Lloyd's place if Byrne finished fourth in the public vote and if Lloyd finished last in the public vote. Other viewers and Byrne voters believed that Minogue was told by producers to vote to send Lloyd through to the final, on the producers' assumption at the time that Byrne finished fourth in the public vote and Lloyd finished last in the public vote in order to preclude Lloyd from being eliminated in the semi-final and the result from going to deadlock. Following Byrne's comments and the accusations by viewers and public supporters of Byrne, Cowell wrote an open letter to the viewers in the Daily Mirror to explain why the final showdown in the semi-final occurred by saying:

"It's always our sole intention to try and make the show as entertaining and hopefully exciting every week. Our main focus is to ensure that the contestants are given every opportunity to benefit from being on the show and show their talent. Throughout the series I have met with fans of the show on a regular basis and have listened and acted on their feedback. I believe they have enjoyed the changes in the show this year and I feel it's been a better series as it hasn't followed the same pattern as before. This year we decided to give four contestants a second chance and introduce them as wild card entrants on the first live show. And having 16 finalists rather than just 12 meant that we introduced both single and double eliminations [though this was inaccurate as a double elimination was introduced and performed once in the 2006 UK series]. We decided for the first time some weeks ago to put four people into the final and this meant having five semi-finalists. We also felt it would be fairer that there would be a sing-off rather than automatic elimination as there were more contestants. I understand new decisions are seen as controversial by our viewers but it stops the show becoming boring. As the excitement heats up, debates begin but I do want to assure people that the show is definitely not fixed. The sing-off on Sunday [5 December 2010] was something that was always going to happen regardless of who was in the bottom two. The contestants all prepared their save-me songs on Monday last week [29 November 2010]. It was always going to be sad for whoever left. [...] I have always listened to and respected our viewers and have always believed viewers ultimately make the right decision. I hope the viewers trust the show that this is a fair competition."

During the final four press conference, a press reporter asked Cowell about his thoughts on the infuriated public who felt misguided on the semi-final result show format. Cowell replied by claiming he re-watched the semi-final result show, that the show misleading the viewers was unintended, and issued an apology to the enticed public voters who felt enraged with the semi-final result.

Voting statistics revealed that if there was not a final showdown or if Minogue or Cowell voted to send Byrne through to the final or if the result went to deadlock, Byrne would have advanced to the final and Lloyd would have been eliminated.

Due to the high accusations of the final showdown in the semi-final this series, the final showdown in the semi-final did not return until the 2013 UK series and continued onwards with the exception of the 2017 UK series.

=== Pitch-correction use ===
Following the first episode, viewers complained on social networking websites after it appeared that pitch correction (which has been seen as controversial in the music industry) was used to improve the quality of some singers' voices, and forty-five viewers complained to Ofcom. Series producers claimed post-production work was necessary on the show because of the number of microphones used during filming: "The judges make their decisions at the auditions stage based on what they hear on the day, live in the arena. The footage and sound is then edited and dubbed into a finished programme, to deliver the most entertaining experience possible for viewers. When it gets to the live shows, it will be all live." In October 2010, Ofcom ruled that viewers had not been "materially misled" as pitch correction was only used during auditions and not when viewers were paying to vote for the contestants.

=== "Raunchy" final ===
In December 2010, it emerged that Ofcom were investigating the show after claims that viewers were being encouraged to purchase songs recorded by guest performers Michael Bublé and Diana Vickers. Ofcom also received over 2,868 complaints from viewers about "raunchy" dance routines from Rihanna and Christina Aguilera during the final. Although an ITV spokesperson denied the routines were inappropriate, Cowell was warned by ITV to "cut the sleaze". In April 2011, Ofcom ruled that there had been no breach of guidelines over the performances, and highlighted that "approximately 2,000" of the complaints were received after the routines were covered by the Daily Mail, and said the newspaper's report featured a number of stills that were "significantly more graphic and close-up" than material broadcast, and that were "taken from a different angle to the television cameras".

=== Praise and awards ===
In its 7 December 2010 issue, Heat magazine said series 7 of The X Factor had been the best series to date, citing many of the controversies, plus events such as Lloyd singing on a spiral staircase, Wagner's "ludicrous" performances and Walsh likening Richardson to "a little Lenny Henry", as moments that helped make it "the most deliriously, thrilling, controversial and demented yet. [...] This was the year the biggest and best show on TV somehow got bigger and better." Before the final, Digital Spy's reality television editor Alex Fletcher listed his five favourite moments from the series. His favourite moment was Nhengu's elimination, on which he said "No other show can make people so passionate, angry and feel like they really know the programme's stars. With only approximately 30 minutes of screentime, Gamu had managed to capture the hearts of millions. Whatever you think of Simon Cowell's programmes, you have to give them credit for achieving that."

The series won in the Most Popular Talent Show category at the 16th National Television Awards in 2011, beating series 4 of Britain's Got Talent, series 6 of Dancing on Ice and series 8 of Strictly Come Dancing. It was also nominated in the TV Reality Programme category at the 2011 TRIC awards, the Entertainment Programme category at the 2011 British Academy Television Awards, and the Best Talent Show category at the 2011 TV Choice Awards.
