= Matthew Raymond-Barker =

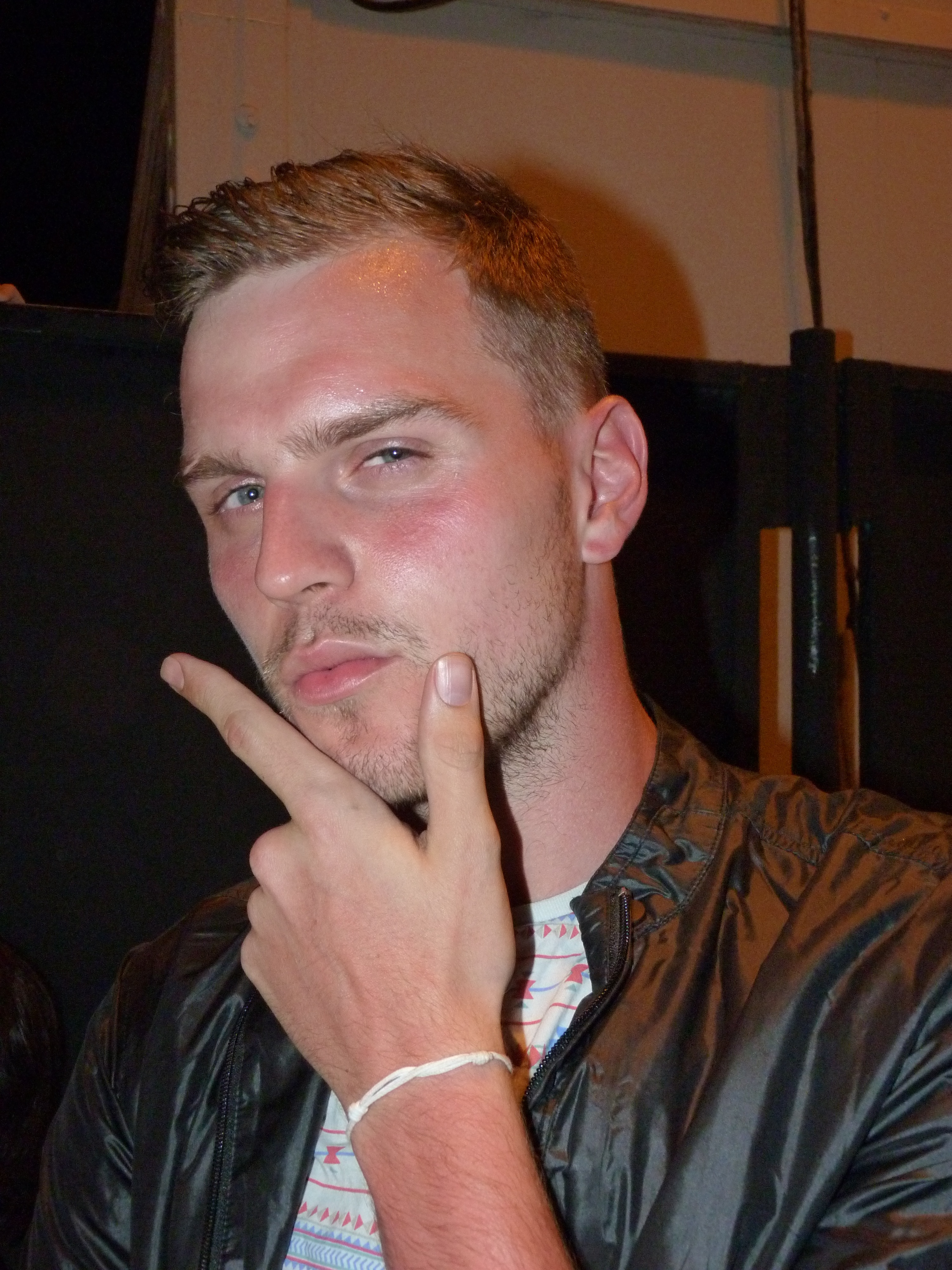
- Matthew Raymond-Barker (2012)

Background information
- Born: Matthew William Raymond-Barker; 20 June 1989 (age 37)
- Origin: London, England
- Genres: Pop
- Occupation: Singer
- Instrument: Vocals
- Years active: 2011 – present
- Label: Sony Music

Matthew Raymond-Barker (born 20 June 1989 in London, England) is an English singer who won the second season of the French X Factor in 2011. He received the grand cash prize and a recording deal with Sony Music.

== Early life ==
Born in London, Matthew William Raymond-Barker is the only son of Karen (née Jacobs) and William Francis Raymond-Barker. He lives in Mitcham, south-west London, works in Waterford and attended Emanuel School in Battersea.

Raymond-Barker had applied initially to the British The X Factor competition, but was rejected after the first day of bootcamp.

Raymond-Barker studied French and Spanish at the University of Bath. He spent six months in France to improve his language skills at University of Toulouse. He applied to the French X Factor in Montpellier after a friend of his spotted an advertisement for the French competition.

He was coached in the series by Véronic DiCaire.

== Performances on X Factor ==
Raymond-Barker qualified to the Final 12 after singing "Just the Way You Are" by Bruno Mars in the auditions. During the live shows, he sang the following songs:

Week	Song performed	Original artist	Result
Week 1	"Supreme"	Robbie Williams	Safe
Week 2	"Price Tag"	Jessie J	Safe
Week 3	"Soulman"	Ben l'Oncle Soul	Safe
Week 4	"Man in the Mirror"	Michael Jackson	Safe
Week 5	"One"	U2	Safe
Week 6	"Time After Time"	Cyndi Lauper	Safe
Week 6	"Ma philosophie"	Amel Bent	Safe
Week 7	"Single Ladies (Put a Ring on It)"	Beyoncé Knowles	Safe
Week 7	"Ça fait mal"	Christophe Maé	Safe
Week 8	"Nothing Compares 2 U"	Sinéad O'Connor	Bottom 2 / Saved by judges 3-0
Week 8	"Dieu m'a donné la foi"	Ophélie Winter	Bottom 2 / Saved by judges 3-0
Week 8	"Use Somebody"	Kings of Leon	Bottom 2 / Saved by judges 3-0
Week 9 (quarter-finals)	"A la faveur de l'automne"	Tété	Safe
Week 9 (quarter-finals)	"Dynamite"	Taio Cruz	Safe
Week 10 (semi-finals)	"Like a Prayer"	Madonna	Safe
Week 10 (semi-finals)	"Viva la Vida"	Coldplay	Safe
Week 10 (semi-finals)	"Ne retiens pas tes larmes"	Amel Bent	Safe
Week 11 (final)	Medley "Love the Way You Lie" / "Don't Stop the Music" / "Tik Tok"	Eminem / Rihanna / Kesha	Winner
Week 11 (final)	"Man in the Mirror"	Michael Jackson	Winner
Week 11 (final)	"Vivre ou survivre" (Winner's song)	Daniel Balavoine	Winner

During the competition, he was in Bottom two only once (week 8–7 June 2011) and sang for his life against Florian Giustiniani and was saved by unanimous vote of the judges after singing "Use Somebody" from the Kings of Leon.

In the finals, aired on 28 June, he beat Marina D'Amico who became runner-up. The difference between the two was a mere 1300 votes. Maryvette Lair finished third.

== Post X Factor ==
Raymond-Barker's winner's song, a cover of Daniel Balavoine's hit "Vivre ou survivre", was his debut single in France, and was released on 2 July 2011. The single debuted at number 94. His first album was due for release in November 2011 on Sony Music and reportedly titled Trash, but never materialised. The single from the prospective album, was an electro-pop track called "Trash (Tout le monde jump sur le bar)". It was released 19 September 2011 but did not chart. In 2012 he released his debut album "One" which has never reached the French Top 250 selling fewer than 50 copies in its first week. A few months later only 500 copies have been sold. "One" is the lowest selling album from a winner of that kind of TV show in France.

== Discography ==
=== Singles ===
Year	Single	Peak chart positions		Album
Year	Single	FRA	BEL (Wa)	Album
2011	"Vivre ou survivre"	94	23	Non-album release from X Factor
2011	"Trash (Tout le monde jump sur le bar)"	–	–	One
2012	"City Lights"	–	–	One

Preceded by Sébastien Agius	X Factor; Winner; 2011	Succeeded by Incumbent
