= Alain Lanty =

French singer and pianist

Alain Lanty (born 28 November 1961 in Auray, France) is a French singer, composer and pianist.

He has composed songs for a great number of French artists including Renaud, Florent Pagny, Marc Lavoine, Dani, Régine, Maurane, Hélène Ségara, Jean-Luc Lahaye.

Alain Lanty is also a renowned pianist and has played the piano on a number of albums, for Pascal Obispo, Calogero, Johnny Hallyday, Raphaël, Isabelle Boulay, Emmanuel Moire, La Grande Sophie, Grand Corps Malade and many others.

He accompanied Renaud in the latter's tour "Une guitare, un piano et Renaud". He composed music for the songs "Coeur perdu", "Baltique", "Mon nain de jardin" and "Mal barrés" for the Renaud album Boucan d'enfer.

In 2009, he was a judge in the first ever series of the singing competition show X Factor in France.

Alain Lanty has composed many theme music for television series and shows, feature films and various short films, musicals like the 2000 hit Les mille et une vies d'Ali Baba (The Thousand and One Lives of Ali Baba).

He has taken part in many charity events including long-running support for charity projects Restaurants du Cœur, Sol En Si, Sidaction.

He also has a series of jingles for advertisements, most notably for Orange S.A., La Redoute, E.Leclerc and the French La Poste.

== Discography ==
=== Album ===
- 1990: Atlantique

=== Singles ===
- 1984: Pourquoi t'es pas là ?/Petit chagrin
- 1985: Mozart / Québec, 3 heures du matin
- 1986: Shanghai au crépuscule/Aigue-marine
- 1990: Tant bien que mal/À quelqu'un, à personne
- 1991: Vous voudriez vivre à ma place/Aimé à mort
- 1993: Elle est bonne/Posons nos valises
