= Jean Schultheis =

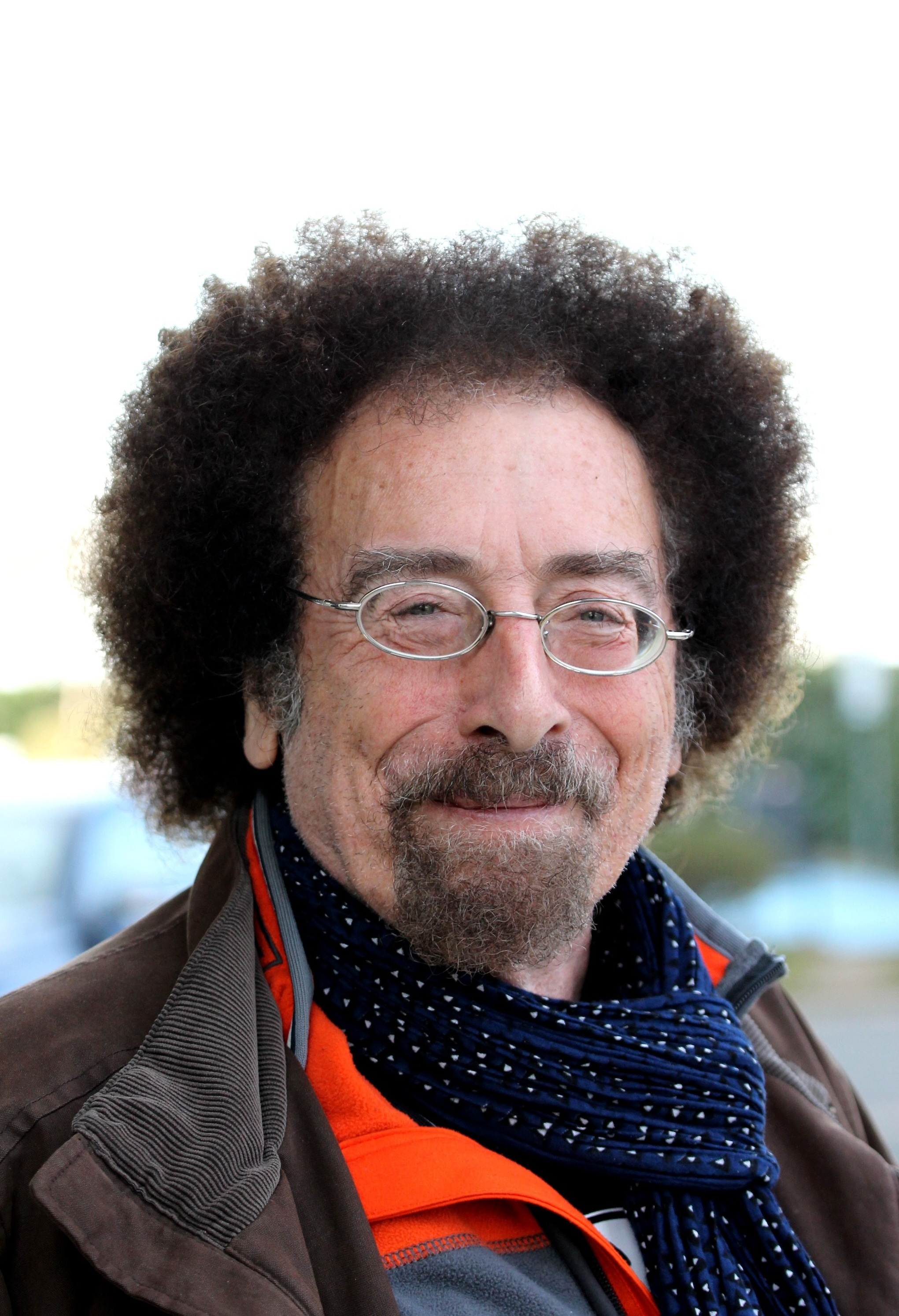
- Schultheis in 2016

Background information
- Born: Jean Edouard Louis Schultheis; October 27, 1943 (age 82); Casablanca, Morocco
- Origin: France
- Genres: Middle of the road
- Occupation: Singer-songwriter
- Instrument: Piano · drums
- Years active: 1970–present
- Citizenship: France
- Political party: Ecology Generation
- Children: Olivier and Julien

Jean Edouard Louis Schultheis (born October 27, 1943), better known as Jean Schultheis is a Moroccan-born French singer-songwriter, musician, and record producer. He was made famous by his single, "Confidence pour confidence", released in 1981.

== Early life and career ==
Schultheis was born October 27, 1943, in Casablanca, Morocco. Schultheis started studying piano at the age of five, and at fourteen, he entered the Conservatoire de Paris. In two years, he gained his first medal in specialized music theory. He won a first prize after entering harmony and counterpoint with master Challan and was unanimously named first prize in percussion in 1963. In 1967, he played drums and percussion for Hugues Aufray.

== Musical career ==
=== 1970–1990 ===
His career began in the 1970s with the musical La Révolution Française, where he played as prosecutor Antoine Quentin Fouquier-Tinville. He became a musician for Michel Jonasz and Maxime Le Forestier, for whom he played the drums and the piano. In 1976, he was a drummer on the album Hamlet by Johnny Hallyday. He did all the choirs for the song L'ami Caouette by Serge Gainsbourg. In 1976 released his first album, Hot Time, through Tele Music. His second album, Spectacles, was released two years after.

It was revealed in 1981 in the program Dimanche Martin (hosted by Jacques Martin), he was then a musician in the orchestra conducted by Raymond Lefèvre, then by Bob Quibel; That same year, he experienced success as a singer with the song "Confidence for confidence", which uses a particular method of construction of the text (an anadiplosis), each half-verse starting with the same syllable as the end of the previous half-verse, which creates an unusual cadence. The single ranks number one in the hit parade.

In 1981, he released his third album, Abracadabra, where the singles "Confidence pour confidence" and "Je largue tout" came from, followed by his fourth album, Growing up and a fourth, Portrait robot and the singles I'm looking for you without finding me, Baby Bop come out. In addition to his singing career, he is also a songwriter and produced the first album by Julie Pietri with the collaboration of Jean-Marie Moreau, and produced certain titles by Philippe Cataldo, most notably the hit "Les Divas du dancing", in 1986. Schultheis also composed for television, notably in the credits of television programs, such as the song "Pour être un coco boy", from the program Coco-boy, as well as Playmate inspired by his single, "Bébé Bop". In 1987, the single Va te faire voir was another success.

=== 1991–present ===
He released his fifth and last album, J'ai pris mon temps in 1991. After a career in the spotlight, Schultheis remained in the world of music by collaborating with various artists as a pianist alongside Michel Sardou, Michel Berger, Alain Manaranche, Serge Lama and Julien Clerc. In 1991, he signed a title on the album "Ça ne change pas un homme" by Johnny Hallyday. In 2003, Schultheis became a music teacher in the third season of Star Academy, succeeding Clara Ponty. His son, Olivier Schultheis, is also a musician and composes for several artists of the series.

In 2007, he ran an unsuccessful campaign in the French legislative elections in the first district of Var under the Ecology Generation party. In 2007 and 2008, he participated in the RFM Party 80 tour, a musical show that brings together singers from the 1980s who were at the top of the Top 50. In 2012, he was part of the Summer Party 80. The program Stars 80 produced by Thomas Langmann tells in a humorous way the adventure of the successful tour RFM Party 80 which gathered more than a million spectators. He plays himself.

== Personal life ==
Schultheis has two sons: Olivier Schultheis and Julien Schultheis.

== Discography ==
=== Studio albums ===
- Spectacles (1978)
- Abracadabra (1981)
- Grandir (1981)
- Portrait robot (1984)
- J'ai pris mon temps (1991)

=== Singles ===
- Ma main / Quand je chante en yaourt (1978)
- Romance en Fa dièse / À la cigogne amoureuse (1979)
- Confidence pour confidence / App'lez la police (1981) [France: #01]
- Je largue tout / T'es ma baby (1982)
- Je te cherche sans me trouver / Bébé Bop (1982)
- Pour être un Co-co boy / Playmate (1982)
- Tequila Bar / Aventure (1984)
- R’garde un peu comme tu marches / Coucou nana (1985)
- Va te faire voir (chez les Grecs) / Va te faire voir (instrumental) (1987) France [France: #60]
- Météo / Fort, fort, fort (1989)
