= Whatfor =

Fictional Music Group

- Origin: France
- Genres: Pop
- Years active: 2002–2003
- Past members: Cyril; Erika; Nicolas; Monia

Whatfor is the name of the band created by the second season of the popular French reality-TV show Popstars aired on RTL Group TV channel M6 in fall 2002. The group consisted of Cyril and Erika (from Marseille), Nicolas (from Toulon) and Monia (from the Lyon suburbs).

Their first hit "Plus haut" (Higher) reached rank #1 in the French charts and so did their first and only album. Their musical style was a mix of modern dance music, pop, and R&B, with a clear late 1970s disco/funk touch that is mainly because the mastermind behind this album, Philippe Saisse, was the one behind the most successful albums of some great artists of that era like Chic and Chaka Khan.

But the success story ended as their second single called "L'amour n'a pas de loi!" ("Love knows no law!"), a cover of Swedish singer Carola's song "A Kiss Goodbye" (from her album My Show) was a flop.

The group disbanded in 2003. Erika and Cyril founded a band together (Everton), and Nicolas tried a solo career, but none of their attempts were successful.

== Discography ==
=== Album ===
- What For (2002)

=== Singles ===
- "Plus haut" (2002)
- "L'amour n'a pas de loi!" (2003)
