= X Factor (French TV series) =

- Created by: Simon Cowell
- Presented by: Alexandre Devoise (2009); Sandrine Corman (2011); Jérôme Anthony (2011)
- Judges: Marc Cerrone (2009); Alain Lanty (2009); Julie Zenatti (2009); Véronic Dicaire (2011); Olivier Schultheis (2011); Henry Padovani (2011); Christophe Willem (2011)
- Countries of origin: France; Belgium
- Original language: French
- No. of seasons: 2

Production
- Producers: FremantleMedia; Syco
- Production locations: Various (auditions); Palais des Sports (Paris); Studios du Lendit - L1
- Running time: 115mins (inc. adverts)

Original release
- Network: France W9 (2009); France M6 (2011); Wallonia RTL-TVI
- Release: September 28, 2009 – June 28, 2011

X Factor is a Franco-Belgian television music talent show to find new singing talent after public auditions, intermediate tests, and live shows. The first season was broadcast on Mondays, from September to December 2009, on W9 (France) and RTL-TVI (Belgium).

The second and final season was broadcast on Tuesdays, from March to June 2011, on M6 and RTL-TVI.

== Series overview ==
Contestant in "Alain Lanty" (over the age of 25)
Contestant in "Julie Zenatti" (ages 16 to 24)
Contestant in "Marc Cerrone" (groups)
Contestant in "Henri Padovani" (groups)
Contestant in "Oliver Schultheis" (girls)
Contestant in "Christophe Willem" (over the age of 25)
Contestant in "Véronic DiCaire" (boys)

| Season | Start | Finish | Winner | Runner-Up | Winning Mentor | Presenter | Main judges | | | | Guest judges |
| Season | Start | Finish | Winner | Runner-Up | Winning Mentor | Presenter | 1 | 2 | 3 | 4 | Guest judges |
|---|---|---|---|---|---|---|---|---|---|---|---|
| 1 | 28 September 2009 | 28 December 2009 | Sébastien Agius | Marie | Alain Lanty | Alexandre Devoise | Alain Lanty | Julie Zenatti | Marc Cerrone | | |
| 2 | 15 March 2011 | 28 June 2011 | Matthew Raymond-Barker | Marina d'Amico | Véronic DiCaire | Sandrine Corman | Olivier Schultheis | Christophe Willem | Véronic Dicaire | Henry Padovani | |

=== Judges' categories and their contestants ===
In each season, each judge is allocated a category to mentor and chooses three acts to progress to the live shows. This table shows, for each season, which category each judge was allocated and which acts he or she put through to the live shows.

Key:

– Winning judge/category. Winners are in bold, eliminated contestants in small font.

| Season | Alain Lanty | Marc Cerrone | Julie Zenatti | —N/a |
|---|---|---|---|---|
| **1** | **Over 25's** **Sébastien**; Annie; Cécile | **Groups**; Basilic; Character Soul; Gauthier Dymon & Flo | **16-24's** Marie; Cyrielle; Guillaume | —N/a |
| Season | Olivier Schultheis | Christophe Willem | Véronic Dicaire | Henry Padovani |
| **2** | **Girls**; Marina D'Amico; Sarah Manesse; Bérénice Schleret | **Over 25's** Maryvette Lair; Vincent Léoty; Cécile Couderc | **Boys**; **Matthew Raymond-Barker**; Florian Giustiniani; Raphaël Herrerias | **Groups**; 2nde Nature; Oméga; Twem |

== Season 1 (2009) ==
The first season of the show aired from September to December 2009 and the winner was 26-year-old Sébastien Agius from the "Over 25" category. The judges were Alain Lanty, Julie Zenatti and Marc Cerrone.

=== Contestants ===
The top 9 acts were confirmed as follows:

Key:

– Winner
– Runner up

| Category (mentor) | Acts | | |
|---|---|---|---|
| Over 25 (Lanty) | Annie | Cécile | Sébastien |
| Groups (Cerrone) | Basilic | Character Soul | Gauthier Dymon & Flo |
| 16-24s (Zenatti) | Cyrielle | Guillaume | Marie |

=== Results summary ===
Color key:

| – | Contestant in the category 16-24 |
| – | Contestant in the category over 25 |
| – | Contestant in the category groups |
| – | Contestant was in the bottom two and had to sing again in the final showdown |
| – | Contestant received the fewest public votes and was immediately eliminated (no final showdown) |

| | Week 1 | Week 2 | Week 3 | Week 4 | Week 5 | Week 6 | Week 7 | Week 8 |
| | Week 1 | Week 2 | Week 3 | Week 4 | Week 5 | Week 6 | SEMIFINAL | FINAL |
|---|---|---|---|---|---|---|---|---|
| Sébastien | Safe | Safe | Safe | Safe | Safe | Safe | Safe | Winner |
| Marie | Safe | Safe | Safe | Safe | Safe | Bottom two | Safe | Runner up |
| Basilic | Safe | Safe | Safe | Safe | Bottom two | Safe | 3rd | Eliminated (Week 7) |
| Cyrielle | Bottom two | Safe | Bottom two | Bottom two | Safe | Bottom two | Eliminated (Week 6) | |
| Guillaume | Safe | Safe | Safe | Safe | Bottom two | Eliminated (Week 5) | | |
| Annie | Safe | Safe | Safe | Bottom two | Eliminated (Week 4) | | | |
| Character Soul | Safe | Bottom two | Bottom two | Eliminated (Week 3) | | | | |
| Gauthier Dymon & Flo | Safe | Bottom two | Eliminated (Week 2) | | | | | |
| Cécile | Bottom two | Eliminated (Week 1) | | | | | | |
| Bottom two | Cyrielle, Cécile | Character Soul, Gauthier Dymon & Flo | Cyrielle, Character Soul | Cyrielle, Annie | Basilic, Guillaume | Marie, Cyrielle | No judges' vote or final showdown: public votes alone decide who is eliminated and who ultimately wins | |
| Zenatti's vote to eliminate | Cécile | Gauthier Dymon & Flo | Character Soul | Annie | Basilic | Cyrielle | No judges' vote or final showdown: public votes alone decide who is eliminated and who ultimately wins | |
| Cerrone's vote to eliminate | Cécile | Gauthier Dymon & Flo | Cyrielle | Annie | Guillaume | Marie | No judges' vote or final showdown: public votes alone decide who is eliminated and who ultimately wins | |
| Lanty's vote to eliminate | Cyrielle | Character Soul | Character Soul | Cyrielle | Guillaume | Cyrielle | No judges' vote or final showdown: public votes alone decide who is eliminated and who ultimately wins | |
| Eliminated | Cécile; 2 of 3 votes | Gauthier Dymon & Flo; 2 of 3 votes | Character Soul; 2 of 3 votes | Annie; 2 of 3 votes | Guillaume; 2 of 3 votes | Cyrielle; 2 of 3 votes | Basilic | Marie; 48% to win |
| Eliminated | Cécile; 2 of 3 votes | Gauthier Dymon & Flo; 2 of 3 votes | Character Soul; 2 of 3 votes | Annie; 2 of 3 votes | Guillaume; 2 of 3 votes | Cyrielle; 2 of 3 votes | Basilic | Sébastien; 52% to win |

=== Ratings ===
| Show | Date | Viewers | Share | Source |
|---|---|---|---|---|
| Auditions 1 | 28 September 20:35-22:30 | 589,000 | 2.3 % | |
| Auditions 2 | 5 October 20:35-22:30 | 800,000 | 2.9% | |
| Auditions 3 | 12 October 20:35-22:30 | 691,000 | 2.6% | |
| Boot Camp | 19 October 20:35-22:30 | 812,000 | 3.3% | |
| Judge's Houses 1 | 26 October 20:35-22:30 | 640,000 | 2.5% | |
| Judge's Houses 2 | 2 November 20:35-22:30 | 619,000 | 2.3% | |
| Live Show / Results 1 | 9 November 20:35-22:30 | 863,000 | 3.5% | |
| Live Show / Results 2 | 16 November 20:35-22:30 | 726,000 | 3.0% | |
| Live Show / Results 3 | 23 November 20:35-22:30 | 670,000 | 2.6% | |
| Live Show / Results 4 | 30 November 20:35-22:30 | 928,000 | 3.7 % | |
| Live Show / Results 5 | 7 December 20:35-22:30 | 715,000 | 3.4% | |
| Live Show / Results 6 | 14 December 20:35-22:30 | 800,000 | 3.3% | |
| Semifinal / Results 7 | 21 December 20:35-22:30 | 613,000 | 2.3% | |
| Final / Results 8 | 28 December 20:35-22:30 | 900,000 | 3.6% | |

== Season 2 (2011) ==
Based on a generally good public reception, and after some speculations, X Factor came back for a second season in March 2011 on M6 (mother TV channel of W9), in place of Nouvelle Star, the French Pop Idol, programmed on M6 since 7 years after audience figures deteriorated for Star

Frédéric de Vincelles, general manager of W9, declared that even though all targeted goals were not attained in season 1, the program had still realised some respectable audience figures for the chain, making it the biggest grossing program for the network in 2009.

=== Differences with first season ===
- First season was aired on a small TV channel with limited means. This is not the case with the second season, as the program tries to emulate the successful British edition.
- For this second season, M6 assigned 4 artists to be part of the jury: Christophe Willem, Véronic Dicaire, Olivier Schultheis and Henry Padovani. All judges are new and replace the old set of three judges Marc Cerrone, Alain Lanty and Julie Zenatti.
- Auditions were held in major French theatres, in public.
- The bootcamp lasted for days and included 3 events: vocal duels, choreography and solos on orchestra-band.
- Two to three French or international popstars are invited each week during liveshows .
- During shows, a second program, named "F@n Factor: Le Prime", is broadcast on the internet to show the backstage and see preparation of candidates and their reactions after singing. So, there isn't an after-show as Xtra Factor.
- Every day, a short program, named "F@n Factor: Le Mag", is broadcast on the internet to show repetitions of candidates with their coaches, and their daily activities.

=== Judges and hosts ===
For this second season, judges of the first season are not renewed. Also, for the first time, there are four judges (so four categories in competition) :

- Christophe Willem (27 years old) – French singer and songwriter. He sang in a gospel choir and won the fourth edition of Nouvelle Star (French version of Pop Idol) in 2006. He sold over 2 million albums and was nominated several times in NRJ Music Awards and Victoires de la Musique.
- Olivier Schultheis (45 years old) – French conductor, musician and songwriter. He discovered Christophe Maé and composed for Hélène Ségara, Thierry Amiel, Christophe Willem and for musicals (Le Roi Soleil, Mozart l'opéra rock...) and wrote soundtracks for films. He was also a producer of Nouvelle Star (French version of Pop Idol).
- Véronic DiCaire (34 years old) - Franco-Ontarian singer and imitator. She was discovered by Céline Dion and René Angélil and was renowned for her imitations of many voices including Céline Dion, Tina Turner, Lynda Lemay, Lara Fabian, Isabelle Boulay, Christina Aguilera, Cyndi Lauper, Vanessa Paradis and others. She released two albums (with her real performing voice) in 2002 and 2005.
- Henry Padovani (58 years old) – Corsican songwriter, guitarist and manager. He is the founding member of The Police with Stewart Copeland but Sting fired him in favour of Andy Summers. He was the director of IRS Records, where he promoted many groups such as R.E.M., The Fleshtones, The Cramps, and The Bangles. He was also the manager of Zucchero and I Muvrini.

To present the show, M6 selected Sandrine Corman for the liveshows and early stages and Jérôme Anthony for F@n Factor and early stages.

=== Chronology of the early stages ===
- Preselections:
  - 2 November 2010 in Nice, Lyon and Strasbourg
  - 4 November 2010 in Marseille, Lille and Clermont-Ferrand
  - 6 November 2010 in Montpellier, Rennes and Brussels (Belgium)
  - 8 November 2010 in Toulouse
  - 9–10 November 2010 in Paris
- Auditions:

| Audition city | Dates | Venue |
|---|---|---|
| Lille | 2–3 December 2010 | Lille Grand Palais (1,500 seats) |
| Lyon | 9 December 2010 | Cité-Centre de Congrès de Lyon (3,000 seats) |
| Montpellier | 13–14 December 2010 | Zénith Sud (3,200 seats) |
| Paris | 3-4-5–6 January 2011 | Studio 204 - Plaine Saint-Denis (600 seats) |

- 'Bootcamp' : 25-26-27–28 January 2011 in Palais des Sports (Paris).

=== Judges' Houses ===
Top 24 acts were chosen with six in each of the four category. The judges added a 25th contestant in the Groups category making the contestants for the Groups seven instead of six. The newly created group was named "Seconde Nature" and included 5 candidates who had applied for the "Boys" category but had failed to qualify individually to the Top 24, but were deemed talented enough to be given a second chance by performing as part of a band in the Groups category.

Summary of Judges' Houses
| Judge | Category | Location | Assistants | Acts eliminated |
|---|---|---|---|---|
| DiCaire | Boys | Quebec | Roch Voisine . | Sofiane Boncoeur, Slimane Nebchi, Michael Picquerey |
| Willem | Over 25s | London | Zaho | Lilou Bourial, Christophe Gilard, Barry Johnson |
| Schultheis | Girls | Morocco | Alain Chamfort | Ana Dupont, Charlène Gervais, Audrey Passani |
| Padovani | Groups | French Perigord | Sharleen Spiteri | Arcanes, New Style Project, Presteej, Swalk |

=== Contestants ===
Key:

– Winner
– Runner-Up

| Category (mentor) | Acts | | |
|---|---|---|---|
| Over 25s (Willem) | Cécile Couderc | Maryvette Lair | Vincent Léoty |
| Groups (Padovani) | Oméga | 2nde Nature | Twem |
| Girls (Schultheis) | Marina D'Amico | Sarah Manesse | Bérénice Schleret |
| Boys (DiCaire) | Florian Giustiniani | Raphaël Herrerias | Matthew Raymond-Barker |

=== Results summary ===
Colour key:

| – | Contestant in the category boys |
| – | Contestant in the category girls |
| – | Contestant in the category over 25 |
| – | Contestant in the category groups |
| – | Contestant was in the bottom two and had to sing again in the final showdown |
| – | Contestant received the fewest public votes and was immediately eliminated (no final showdown) |

| | Week 1 | Week 2 | Week 3 | Week 4 | Week 5 | Week 6 | Week 7 | Week 8 | Week 9 | Week 10 | Week 11 |
|---|---|---|---|---|---|---|---|---|---|---|---|
| Matthew Raymond-Barker | Safe | Safe | Safe | Safe | Safe | Safe | Safe | Bottom two | Safe | Safe | Winner |
| Marina D'Amico | Safe | Safe | Safe | Safe | Safe | Safe | Safe | Safe | Safe | Safe | Runner-Up |
| Maryvette Lair | Safe | Safe | Bottom two | Safe | Safe | Safe | Safe | Safe | Bottom two | 3rd | Eliminated |
| Sarah Manesse | Safe | 10th | Safe | Safe | Bottom two | Safe | Bottom two | Safe | Bottom two | Eliminated (Week 9) | |
| Florian Guiustiniani | Safe | Safe | Safe | Safe | Safe | Safe | Safe | Bottom two | Eliminated (Week 8) | | |
| Raphaël Herrerias | Safe | Safe | Safe | Safe | Safe | Bottom two | Bottom two | Eliminated (Week 7) | | | |
| 2nde Nature | Safe | Safe | Safe | 8th | Safe | Bottom two | Eliminated (Week 6) | | | | |
| Oméga | 11th | Safe | Safe | Safe | Bottom two | Eliminated (Week 5) | | | | | |
| Vincent Léoty | Safe | Safe | Safe | 9th | Eliminated (Week 4) | | | | | | |
| Bérénice Schléret | Safe | Safe | Bottom two | Eliminated (Week 3) | | | | | | | |
| Cécile Couderc | Safe | 11th | Eliminated (Week 2) | | | | | | | | |
| Twem | 12th | Eliminated (Week 1) | | | | | | | | | |
| Final showdown | Oméga, Twem | Cécile Couderc, Sarah Manesse | Bérénice Schléret, Maryvette Lair | 2nde Nature, Vincent Léoty | Oméga, Sarah Manesse | 2nde Nature, Raphaël Herrerias | Raphaël Herrerias, Sarah Manesse | Florian Guiustiniani, Matthew Raymond-Barker | Maryvette Lair, Sarah Manesse | No judges' vote or final showdown: public votes alone decide who is eliminated and who ultimately wins | |
| Padovani's vote to save | Oméga | Cécile Couderc | Maryvette Lair | 2nde Nature | Oméga | 2nde Nature | Sarah Manesse | Matthew Raymond-Barker | Maryvette Lair | No judges' vote or final showdown: public votes alone decide who is eliminated and who ultimately wins | |
| DiCaire's vote to save | Twem | Sarah Manesse | Maryvette Lair | 2nde Nature | Sarah Manesse | Raphaël Herrerias | Raphaël Herrerias | N/A | Maryvette Lair | No judges' vote or final showdown: public votes alone decide who is eliminated and who ultimately wins | |
| Willem's vote to save | Twem | Cécile Couderc | Maryvette Lair | Vincent Léoty | Sarah Manesse | Raphaël Herrerias | Sarah Manesse | Matthew Raymond-Barker | Maryvette Lair | No judges' vote or final showdown: public votes alone decide who is eliminated and who ultimately wins | |
| Schultheis's vote to save | Oméga | Sarah Manesse | Bérénice Schléret | Vincent Léoty | Sarah Manesse | Raphaël Herrerias | Sarah Manesse | Matthew Raymond-Barker | Sarah Manesse | No judges' vote or final showdown: public votes alone decide who is eliminated and who ultimately wins | |
| Eliminated | Twem; 2 of 4 votes Deadlock | Cécile Couderec; 2 of 4 votes Deadlock | Bérénice Schléret; 1 of 4 votes Minority | Vincent Léoty; 2 of 4 votes Deadlock | Oméga; 1 of 4 votes Minority | 2nde Nature; 1 of 4 votes Minority | Raphaël Herrerias; 1 of 4 votes Minority | Florian Guiustiniani; 0 of 3 votes Minority | Sarah Manesse; 1 of 4 votes Minority | Maryvette Lair; Third Place | Marina D'Amico; 49% to win |
| Eliminated | Twem; 2 of 4 votes Deadlock | Cécile Couderec; 2 of 4 votes Deadlock | Bérénice Schléret; 1 of 4 votes Minority | Vincent Léoty; 2 of 4 votes Deadlock | Oméga; 1 of 4 votes Minority | 2nde Nature; 1 of 4 votes Minority | Raphaël Herrerias; 1 of 4 votes Minority | Florian Guiustiniani; 0 of 3 votes Minority | Sarah Manesse; 1 of 4 votes Minority | Maryvette Lair; Third Place | Matthew Raymond-Barker; 51% to win |

=== Ratings ===
| Show | Date | Viewers | Share | Source |
|---|---|---|---|---|
| Auditions 1 | 15 March 20:45-22:45 | 3.3 million | 13.3% | |
| Auditions 2 | 22 March 20:45-22:45 | 2.9 million | 11.7% | |
| Auditions 3 | 29 March 20:45-22:45 | 3.3 million | 13.2% | |
| Bootcamp | 5 April 20:45-23:45 | 2.93 million | 13.9% | |
| Judge's House | 12 April 20:45-23:45 | 3.2 million | 15.6% | |
| Liveshow 1 / Results 1 | 19 April 20:45-23:45 | 2.56 million | 12.4% | |
| Liveshow 2 / Results 2 | 26 April 20:45-23:45 | 2.11 million | 9.9% | |
| Liveshow 3 / Results 3 | 3 May 20:45-23:15 | 2.72 million | 11.8% | |
| Liveshow 4 / Results 4 | 10 May 20:45-23:15 | 2.19 million | 10.1% | |
| Liveshow 5 / Results 5 | 17 May 20:45-23:15 | 2.32 million | 10.1% | |
| Liveshow 6 / Results 6 | 24 May 20:45-23:45 | 2.2 million | 10.2% | |
| Liveshow 7 / Results 7 | 31 May 20:45-23:45 | 2.28 million | 10.4% | |
| Liveshow 8 / Results 8 | 7 June 20:45-23:30 | 2.2 million | 10% | |
| Liveshow 9 / Results 9 | 14 June 20:45-23:30 | 2.62 million | 11.4% | |
| Semifinal / Results 10 | 21 June 20:45-23:15 | 1.95 million | 8.4% | |
| Final / Results 11 | 28 June 20:45-23:15 | 2.4 million | 10.8% | |
