= Sébastien Agius =

- Also known as: Sébastien, Seva
- Born: Sébastien Agius; 2 March 1983 (age 43); Nice, France
- Genres: Pop, comédie musicale
- Occupations: Singer, Songwriter
- Instruments: Vocals, guitar, piano, keyboards, flute
- Years active: 2002–present
- Website: Official Site

Sébastien Agius or just Sébastien or Seva (born 2 March 1983, in Nice, France) is a French singer and songwriter, and winner of the inaugural season of the French X Factor series in 2009.

== Career ==
In 2003, he tried unsuccessfully for the first-ever series of the French singing competition Nouvelle Star. He was touring many years in Gospel pour 100 voix.

Since then, he has had many concerts and taken part in musicals. In 2007, he created the musical Hé l'artiste! with participation of 25 artists. Sébastien Agius wrote the lyrics and the music and designed the choreography.

He also played a role in:

- La Petite Fille aux Allumettes (of Christian Schittenhelm) in the role of Prince
- Le petit chose (of Christian Schittenhelm)
- Piaf, je t'aime in the role of Petit Louis (small Louis).
- La Petite Sirène (of Christian Schittenhelm) in the role of Prince
- Fashion or L'Enfer d'Eurydice in the role of Orphée
- Petits Secrets Entre Voisins, 2014, episode "Une mère absente", playing Marco, the guitar player brother
- Plus belle la vie, 2016 (season 13)

== X Factor ==
Sébastien Agius tried for the new series X Factor in Rennes and was one of the finalists chosen. On 28 December 2009, he won the first ever French edition of The X Factor broadcast on W9 Network in France beating the 17-year-old Marie in the finals.

Songs performed in competition
During the series, he interpreted the following songs:

- "L'envie d'aimer" – Les Dix Commandements – 11 November 2009
- "L'assasymphonie" – Mozart, l'opéra rock – 18 November 2009
- "Somewhere Only We Know" – Keane – 25 November 2009
- "Si seulement je pouvais lui manquer" – Calogero – 30 November 2009
- "Dirty Diana" – Michael Jackson – 30 November 2009
- "Lettre à France" – Michel Polnareff – 7 December 2009
- "Kiss" – Prince – 7 December 2009
- "Requiem pour un fou" – Johnny Hallyday – 14 December 2009
- "Long Train Runnin'" – The Doobie Brothers – 14 December 2009
- "Vivre ou survivre" – Daniel Balavoine – 21 December 2009
- "It's a Man's Man's World" – James Brown – 21 December 2009
- "Sorry Seems to Be the Hardest Word" – Elton John – 21 December 2009
- "Angels" -Robbie Williams – 28 December 2009
- "Je te promets" – Johnny Hallyday – 28 December 2009
- "Unchain My Heart" – Joe Cocker – 28 December 2009

== Post-X Factor ==
After winning, Sébastien Agius signed a record deal with Jive Epic/Sony. In April 2010, Agius also engaged in a tour of French and Belgian venues alongside Season 1 finalists Cyrielle, Gauthier Dymon and Guillaume.

His first official single release is "Ma Chance". released in March 2010. It is a jazzy tune greatly influenced by the Michael Bublé single "Haven't Met You Yet". His first album also entitled Ma chance was released in August 2010. "Ma Chance" did not meet the success the X factor winner hoped for, and the album sales were disappointing.

He is the composer of "Page Blanche, Page Grise, Page Bleue". Agius shifted gear and started appearing in musical comedies including the 2011 production Dracula, l'amour plus fort que la mort (Globe de Cristal Award 2012) by Kamel Ouali where Agius played the double roles of the sorcerer and the angel.

In 2012, Sébastien Agius became the newest cast member of 1789: Les Amants de la Bastille (Globe de Cristal Award 2013) where he plays the role of Maximilien de Robespierre. The show opened on 10 October 2012.

In 2016, Sébastien took part to the 5th season of The Voice : France with Roxane Le Texier under the name of Louyena. They sang Waiting for Love by Avicii and joined Garou's team. They were defeated at the battles by Lola Baï on Encore et encore by Francis Cabrel. They still sing together.

== Discography ==
=== Albums ===
- 2010: Ma chance
  - Track list:
    1. "Ma chance"
    2. "Si tu veux de moi"
    3. "Grande dame"
    4. "You live in my heart"
    5. "Faut que je m'en aille"
    6. "Jolie Julie"
    7. "Les blessures qui ne se voient pas"
    8. "La folie des grandeurs"
    9. "Je marche en moi"
    10. "I don't want her"
    11. "L'ange passe"
    12. "Danse encore" featuring Amy Keys

=== Singles ===
- 2010: "Ma chance"
- 2010: "Je marche en moi"
- 2011: "Si tu veux de moi"
- 2014: "Ce qui nous tient"
- 2014: "From China with love"

Featured

Year	Single	Peak positions		Album
Year	Single	BEL Wa	FR	Album
2012	"Pour la peine" (Rod Janois, Nathalia, Sébastien Agius, Roxane Le Texier, Matthieu Carnot & Camille Lou)	21	36	1789: Les Amants de la Bastille

Preceded by None	X Factor (France); Winner; 2010	Succeeded by Matthew Raymond-Barker
