= Olivier Schultheis =

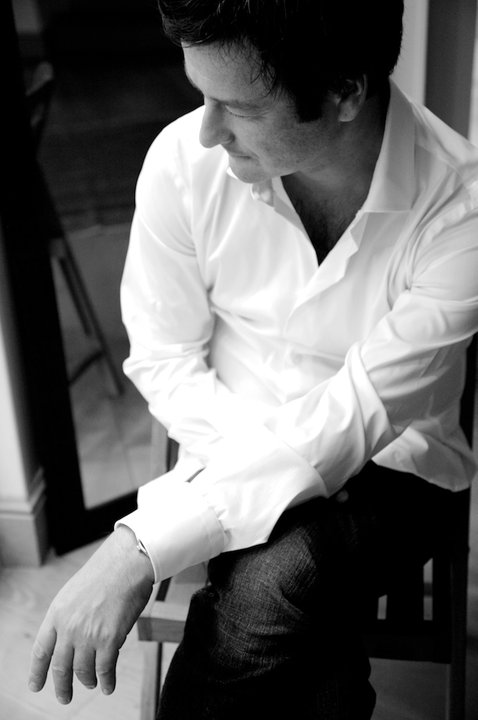

Background information
- Also known as: So
- Born: April 29, 1965 (age 61)
- Origin: France
- Occupation: Musician · composer · conductor · arranger
- Years active: 1990 – present
- Citizenship: France
- Children: Jules, Clemence, and Adrian
- Father: Jean Schultheis
- Relatives: Julien (brother)

Olivier Schultheis (born 29 April 1965) is a musician, a lyricist, a composer and a conductor. He won the top prize of Conservatoire National de Musique de Paris for his absolute pitch technique.

He became the music conductor in French TV show Nouvelle Star (adaptation of American Idol) and he is now a judge in X Factor on M6 (for the second series in 2011), next to Véronic DiCaire, Henry Padovani and Christophe Willem. His father is Jean Schultheis and his brother is Julien Schultheis.

He is the musical conductor of Mylène Farmer's Live 2019 Paris residency and her Nevermore Stadium Tour, after which he composed her standalone single Confession in tribute to film director David Lynch.

== Albums and singles composer ==
- À l'envers, (2004) by Steeve Estatof
- Le Roi Soleil (2005)
- Thierry Amiel (2006) by Thierry Amiel
- Quand l'éternité...(2006) by Hélène Ségara
- Inventaire (2007) by Christophe Willem
- Mon Paradis (2007) by Christophe Maé
- Mozart, l'opéra rock (musical, 2008)
- Best of VO/VS (2010) by Calogero
- Donne moi le temps (2002) by Jennifer
- Confession (2025) by Mylène Farmer

== Live musical direction ==
- Elles et lui au Grand Rex (2012) by Alain Chamfort
- Live 2019 (2019) by Mylène Farmer
- Nevermore 2023/2024 (2023-2024) by Mylène Farmer
