= The Voice: la plus belle voix season 2 =

The Voice: la plus belle voix
- Season 2
- Hosted by: Nikos Aliagas; Karine Ferri
- Judges: Florent Pagny, Jenifer, Louis Bertignac, Garou
- Winner: Yoann Fréget

Release
- Original network: TF1
- Original release: February 2 – May 18, 2013

Season chronology
- ← Previous; Season 1 Next → Season 3

The Voice: la plus belle voix (season 2) was the second season of the French reality singing competition, created by media tycoon John de Mol. It was aired from February 2013 to May 2013 on TF1.

One of the important premises of the show is the quality of the singing talent. Four coaches, themselves popular performing artists, train the talents in their group and occasionally perform with them. Talents are selected in blind auditions, where the coaches cannot see, but only hear the auditioner.

The coaches were Florent Pagny, Jenifer, Louis Bertignac and Garou. The Second Season ended on May 18, 2013, Yoann Fréget was declared the winner.

== Overview ==
– Winning Coach/Contestant. Winner and finalists are in bold, eliminated contestants in small font.
– Runner-Up Coach/Contestant. Final contestant first listed.
– 2nd Runner-Up Coach/Contestant. Final contestant first listed.

Liste des candidats par coaches
Garou	Jenifer	Florent Pagny	Louis Bertignac
**Yoann Fréget**; Tyssa; Sarah Caillibot; Stéfania Rizou; Manurey; Victoria Petrosillo; Céline Caddéo; Baptiste Defromont; Ralf Hartmann; Emmanuel Djob; Claude Schuh; Nungan; Angélina Wismes; Jude Todd; Fanny Leeb; Liza	Olympe; Anthony Touma; Luc Arbogast; Florent Torres; Laura Chab; Dièse; Sean; Claire; Fanny Melili; Sophie Tapie; Jo Soul; Lord Bitum; Rachel Claudio; Gérôme Gallo; Sarah Bismuth; Thomas Vaccari	Nuno Resende; Pierre.G; Sandy Coops; Nadja; Caroline Rose; Florian Carli; Joséphina; Sandra Brandon; Ludivine Aubourg; Michaël Lelong; Alexandra Lucci; Benjamin Bocconi; Quentin Danglas; Mickaël Pouvin; Jonathan Urek; Julien Mior Lambert	Loïs; Marlène Schaff; Shadoh; Matskat; Cécilia Pascal; Kareen Antonn; Nell; Antoine Selman; Louane; Ayme; Aurore Delplace; Maeva Méline; Alexandre Chassagnac; 3nity Brothers; Diana Espir; Keekee

The Canadian singer Jeanick Fournier was approached to participate in the show. She has been on tour since 2006 with a show entirely devoted to Celine Dion. Fournier is directly selected to be one of the 140 finalists. Having revealed her selection to the press, her audition was canceled the next day. In 2022, she is the winner of the second season of Canada's Got Talent. She was given the golden buzzer by host Lindsay Ell.

== Results ==
=== Stage 1 : « Auditions à l'aveugle » (Blind Auditions) ===
The Blind Auditions were broadcast on 2, 9, 16, 23 February and 2 and 9 March 2013.

Key	Coach hit his or her "JE VOUS VEUX" button	Contestant eliminated with no coach pressing his or her "JE VOUS VEUX" button	Contestant defaulted to this coach's team	Contestant elected to join this coach's team

==== Episode 1: February 2, 2013 ====
Order	Contestant	Song	Coaches' and Contestants' Choices			
Order	Contestant	Song	Florent Pagny	Jenifer	Louis Bertignac	Garou
1	Tyssa	Diamonds – Rihanna		—	—	
2	Sarah Caillibot	Pull marine – Isabelle Adjani				
3	Pierre G.	Una furtiva lagrima – Gaetano Donizetti		—	—	
4	Justy	Quand on n'a que l'amour – Jacques Brel	—	—	—	—
5	Anthony Touma	Billie Jean – Michael Jackson				
6	Marlène Schaff	Vancouver – Véronique Sanson		—		
7	Claire Litvine	Ironic – Alanis Morissette	—	—	—	—
8	Luc Arbogast	Cancion sefaradi				
9	Sandy Coops	One Moment in Time – Whitney Houston			—	—
10	Roméo	La Bombe humaine – Téléphone	—	—	—	—
11	Olympe	Born to Die – Lana Del Rey				
12	William	Paradise – Coldplay	—	—	—	—
13	Nadja	Think – Aretha Franklin				
14	Shadoh	Roxanne – The Police		—		

==== Episode 2: February 9, 2013 ====
Order	Contestant	Song	Coaches' and Contestants' Choices			
Order	Contestant	Song	Florent Pagny	Jenifer	Louis Bertignac	Garou
1	Stéfania Rizou	Skyfall – Adele				
2	Florent Torres	Sois tranquille – Emmanuel Moire				—
3	Matskat	Don't Worry, Be Happy – Bobby McFerrin	—			—
4	Florence	Une femme avec toi – Nicole Croisille	—	—	—	—
5	Laura Chab	People Help the People – Birdy				
6	Raf	Your Song – Elton John	—	—	—	—
7	Caroline Rose	New York, New York – Liza Minnelli				—
8	Manurey	Skinny Love – Birdy				
9	Florian Carli	Sintineddi		—	—	—
10	Cécilia Pascal	Poker Face – Lady Gaga				
11	Les Calema	Balada – Gusttavo Lima	—	—	—	—
12	Tristan	U-Turn (Lili) – AaRON	—	—	—	—
13	Kareen Antonn	Against All Odds (Take a Look at Me Now) – Phil Collins		—		—
14	Nell	Parlez-moi de lui – Nicole Croisille	—	—		—

==== Episode 3: February 16, 2013 ====
Order	Contestant	Song	Coaches' and Contestants' Choices			
Order	Contestant	Song	Florent Pagny	Jenifer	Louis Bertignac	Garou
1	Dièse	Turning Tables – Adele				—
2	Abdel	S.O.S. d'un terrien en détresse – Daniel Balavoine	—	—	—	—
3	Antoine Selman	Sympathy for the Devil – The Rolling Stones				
4	Marlène Soler	I Put a Spell on You – Screamin' Jay Hawkins	—	—	—	—
5	Louane	Un homme heureux – William Sheller				
6	Victoria Petrosillo	No More Tears (Enough Is Enough) – Donna Summer & Barbra Streisand		—	—	
7	Joséphina	Caravane – Raphael		—	—	—
8	Ayme	Starlight – Muse		—		
9	Yoann Fréget	The Greatest Love of All – Whitney Houston				
10	Sandra Brandon	True Colors – Cyndi Lauper		—	—	—
11	Céline Caddéo	It's Oh So Quiet – Björk				
12	Guillaume	Requiem pour un fou – Johnny Hallyday	—	—	—	—
13	Loïs	Somebody That I Used to Know – Gotye & Kimbra		—		—
14	Sean	Seven Nation Army – The White Stripes	—		—	—

==== Episode 4: February 23, 2013 ====
Order	Contestant	Song	Coaches' and Contestants' Choices			
Order	Contestant	Song	Florent Pagny	Jenifer	Louis Bertignac	Garou
1	Aurore Delplace	Listen – Beyoncé				
2	Emilie	Stand by Me – Ben E. King	—	—	—	—
3	Baptiste Defromont	Love is All – Roger Glover			—	
4	Nuno Resende	Goodbye Marylou – Michel Polnareff		—	—	—
5	Claire	Pumped Up Kicks – Foster the People	—			—
6	Ralf Hartmann	Say It Ain't So, Joe – Murray Head	—			
7	Julie	Non, je ne regrette rien – Édith Piaf	—	—	—	—
8	Emmanuel Djob	Georgia on My Mind – Ray Charles				
9	Ludivine Aubourg*	When Love Takes Over – David Guetta & Kelly Rowland				
10	Fanny Melili	So Far Away From L.A. – Nicolas Peyrac	—		—	—
11	Sophie Tapie	Grenade – Bruno Mars	—			—
12	Laure Préchac	Loca – Shakira	—	—	—	—
13	Michaël Lelong	If I Ain't Got You – Alicia Keys			—	—
14	Claude Schuh	Grace Kelly – Mika		—	—	

*Already auditioned in season 1, where all four judges turned their chairs for her. She chose Garou but was eliminated during the battle rounds against Blandine Aggery. She auditioned with Stop! of Sam Brown

==== Episode 5: March 2, 2013 ====
Order	Contestant	Song	Coaches' and Contestants' Choices			
Order	Contestant	Song	Florent Pagny	Jenifer	Louis Bertignac	Garou
1	Nungan	Come Together – The Beatles				
2	Jo Soul	Hallelujah I Love Her So – Ray Charles	—		—	—
3	Angelina Wismes	Mon enfance – Barbara				
4	Chris Keller	Cry Me a River – Julie London	—	—	—	—
5	Maeva Méline	Skinny Love – Birdy		—		—
6	Lord Bitum	Face à la mer – Calogero and Passi	—		—	—
7	Jude Todd	U-Turn (Lili) – AaRON	—		—	
8	Suzy R	When a Man Loves a Woman – Percy Sledge	—	—	—	—
9	Alexandre Chassagnac	Nessun dorma – Giacomo Puccini	—	—		—
10	Rachel Claudio	Message in a Bottle – The Police				
11	Alexandra Lucci	Les Bêtises – Sabine Paturel		—		—
12	Justine L'Samra	Starships – Nicki Minaj	—	—	—	—
13	Gérome Gallo	Human Nature – Michael Jackson			—	—
14	Benjamin Bocconi	Puisque tu pars – Jean-Jacques Goldman		—	—	

==== Episode 6: March 9, 2013 ====
Order	Contestant	Song	Coaches' and Contestants' Choices			
Order	Contestant	Song	Florent Pagny	Jenifer	Louis Bertignac	Garou
1	Sarah Bismuth	Listen – Beyoncé	—		—	—
2	Neena	J'aime plus Paris – Thomas Dutronc	—	—	—	—
3	Quentin	S.O.S. d'un terrien en détresse – Daniel Balavoine		—	—	—
4	Thomas Vaccari	Georgia on My Mind – Ray Charles				
5	Fanny Leeb	Don't stop the music – Rihanna	—		—	
6	Mickaël Pouvin	Next to Me – Emeli Sandé		N/a	—	
7	3nity Brothers	When a Man Loves a Woman – Percy Sledge	-	—		—
8	Esther Galil	Le jour se lève – Esther Galil	—	N/a	—	—
9	Liza	American Boy – Estelle	-	N/a	—	
10	Johnathan Urek	Le monde est stone – Fabienne Thibeault		N/a	—	N/a
11	Diana Espir	Flashdance... What a Feeling – Irene Cara	—	N/a		N/a
12	Julien Mior Lambert	Broken Vow – Lara Fabian & Josh Groban		N/a	—	N/a
13	Keekee	Master Blaster (Jammin') – Stevie Wonder	N/a	N/a		N/a

=== Stage 2 : « Battles Musicales » (Musical Battles) ===
During the battles round, each coach was assisted by two singers each as assistant coaches during the preparations to the show.

- Florent Pagny was assisted by Chimène Badi and Lara Fabian;
- Jenifer was assisted Christophe Willem and Alain Chamfort;
- Louis Bertignac was assisted by Joyce Jonathan and Paul Personne;
- Garou was assisted by Patrick Fiori and Grégoire.

==== Episode 7: March 16, 2013 ====
Order	Coach	Winner	Loser(s) or stolen	Coach(es) buzzing for loser (Winning coach in bold)	Song
1	Florent Pagny	Sandy Coops	Nadja	—	Proud Mary – Tina Turner
2	Jenifer	Luc Arbogast	Thomas Vaccari	**Garou**	Mad World – Tears for Fears
3	Garou	Yoann Fréget	Tyssa	**Louis Bertignac**	Can You Feel It – The Jacksons
4	Louis Bertignac	Cécilia Pascal	Keekee	—	Marcia baila – Les Rita Mitsouko
5	Florent Pagny	Pierre G.	Florian Carli	**Jenifer**, Garou	Con te partirò – Andrea Bocelli
6	Jenifer	Anthony Touma	Jo Soul	—	Locked Out of Heaven – Bruno Mars
7	Louis Bertignac	Marlène Schaff	Maeva Méline	—	Nothing Compares 2 U – Prince/Sinéad O'Connor
8	Garou	Angélina Wismes	Fanny Leeb	—	L'Aigle noir – Barbara

==== Episode 8: March 23, 2013 ====
Order	Coach	Winner	Loser(s) or stolen	Coach(es) buzzing for loser (Winning coach in bold)	Song
1	Garou	Céline Caddéo	Nungan	**Louis Bertignac**, Florent Pagny, Jenifer	Je suis un homme – Zazie
2	Jenifer	Olympe	Gérôme Gallo	—	Hometown Glory – Adele
3	Florent Pagny	Ludivine Aubourg	Sandra Brandon	—	I Will Survive – Gloria Gaynor
4	Louis Bertignac	Louane	Diana Espir	—	Torn – Natalie Imbruglia
5	Garou	Emmanuel Djob	Ralf Hartmann	—	A Whiter Shade of Pale – Procol Harum
6	Jenifer	Sarah Bismuth	Dièse	**Florent Pagny**, Garou	Titanium – David Guetta/Sia
7	Florent Pagny	Caroline Rose	Joséphina	—	La Foule – Édith Piaf
8	Louis Bertignac	Loïs	Alexandre Chassagnac	—	S.O.S. d'un terrien en détresse – Daniel Balavoine

==== Episode 9: March 30, 2013 ====
Order	Coach	Winner	Loser(s) or stolen	Coach(es) buzzing for loser (Winning coach in bold)	Song
1	Garou	Stéfania Rizou	Victoria Petrosillo	**Florent Pagny**	I Want to Know What Love Is – Foreigner
2	Louis Bertignac	Shadoh	3nity Brothers	—	Tainted Love – Soft Cell
3	Jenifer	Laura Chab'	Claire	—	Jacques a dit – Christophe Willem
4	Garou	Baptiste Defromont	Claude Schuh	—	Don't Stop Me Now – Queen
5	Florent Pagny	Benjamin Bocconi	Julien Mior Lambert	—	La Quête – Jacques Brel
6	Jenifer	Rachel Claudio	Sean	—	As – Stevie Wonder
7	Louis Bertignac	Nell	Ayme	**Garou**	Je veux te graver dans ma vie – Johnny Hallyday
8	Florent Pagny	Michaël Lelong	Alexandra Lucci	—	Time After Time – Cyndi Lauper

==== Episode 10: April 6, 2013 ====
Order	Coach	Winner	Loser(s) or stolen	Coach(es) buzzing for loser (Winning coach in bold)	Song
1	Louis Bertignac	Aurore Delplace	Kareen Antonn	—	You Raise Me Up – Josh Groban
2	Jenifer	Florent Torres	Fanny Melili	—	Écris l'histoire – Grégory Lemarchal
3	Florent Pagny	Nuno Resende	Quentin Danglas	—	The Show Must Go On – Queen
4	Garou	Sarah Caillibot	Liza	—	Les Uns contre les autres – Starmania
5	Jenifer	Sophie Tapie	Lord Bitum	—	Love the Way You Lie – Eminem & Rihanna
6	Garou	Manurey	Jude Todd	**Jenifer**	Mon Frère – Maxime Le Forestier
7	Louis Bertignac	Antoine Selman	Matskat	—	Wonderwall – Oasis
8	Florent Pagny	Mickael Pouvin	Jonathan Urek	—	S'il suffisait d'aimer – Céline Dion

Teams after the battle rounds

Contestants retained after battle rounds, who will go to the live rounds (in blue, the contestants stolen by other teams) :

Équipes à l'issue des battles
Garou	Jenifer	Florent Pagny	Louis Bertignac
Yoann Fréget; Angélina Wismes; Céline Caddéo; Emmanuel Djob; Stéfania Rizou; Baptiste Defromont; Sarah Caillibot; Manurey	Luc Arbogast; Anthony Touma; Olympe; Sarah Bismuth; Laura Chab; Rachel Claudio; Florent Torres; Sophie Tapie	Sandy Coops; Pierre G. Ludivine Aubourg; Caroline Rose; Benjamin Bocconi; Michaël Lelong; Nuno Resende; Mickaël Pouvin	Cécilia Pascal; Marlène Schaff; Louane; Loïs Silvin; Shadoh; Nell; Aurore Delplace; Antoine Selman
Thomas Vaccari (Jenifer); Ayme (Louis Bertignac)	Florian Carli (Florent Pagny); Jude Todd (Garou)	Dièse (Jenifer); Victoria Petrosillo (Garou)	Tyssa (Garou); Nungan (Garou)

=== Stage 3 : « Primes » (Live Shows) ===
The primes were broadcast in 6 episodes including 3 in the initial rounds, and one each for quarter finals, semi-finals and the final.

==== Episode 11 - Prime 1: 13 April 2013 ====
In the initial; primes, each coach presents 5 contestants. One is voted by the public, one saved by the coach and three are eliminated. In total, each coach will drop 6 of his contestants to end up with just four each

– Contestant saved by the public vote
– Contestant saved by coach
– Contestant eliminated

Order	Coach	Contestant	Song	Result
1	Garou	Manurey	Viva la Vida – Coldplay	Saved by coach
2	Garou	Angélina Wismes	Hijo de la Luna – Mecano	Eliminated
3	Garou	Céline Caddéo	I Follow Rivers – Lykke Li	Eliminated
4	Garou	Thomas Vaccari	I Believe I Can Fly – R. Kelly	Eliminated
5	Garou	Emmanuel Djob	L'Encre de tes yeux – Francis Cabrel	Saved by the public
6	Louis Bertignac	Aurore Delplace	Try – Pink	Eliminated
7	Louis Bertignac	Antoine Selman	Toute la musique que j'aime – Johnny Hallyday	Eliminated
8	Louis Bertignac	Shadoh	Raggamuffin – Selah Sue	Saved by coach
9	Louis Bertignac	Loïs	J'te l'dis quand même – Patrick Bruel	Saved by the public
10	Louis Bertignac	Marlène Schaff	The Edge of Glory – Lady Gaga	Eliminated
11	Florent Pagny	Ludivine	Crazy in Love – Beyoncé / Crazy – Gnarls Barkley	Eliminated
12	Florent Pagny	Benjamin Bocconi	Somebody to Love – Queen	saved by the public
13	Florent Pagny	Dièse	Comme ils disent – Charles Aznavour	saved by the coach
14	Florent Pagny	Michaël Lelong	Down the road – C2C	Eliminated
15	Florent Pagny	Caroline Rose	Il est mort le soleil – Nicoletta	Eliminated
16	Jenifer	Sarah Bismuth	Run to You – Whitney Houston	Saved by the coach
17	Jenifer	Florent Torres	Prendre racine – Calogero	Eliminated
18	Jenifer	Olympe	Zombie – The Cranberries	Saved by the public
19	Jenifer	Sophie Tapie	L'envie – Johnny Hallyday	Eliminated
20	Jenifer	Luc Arbogast	Adagio d'Albinoni – Remo Giazotto	Eliminated

==== Episode 12 - Prime 2: 20 April 2013 ====
– Contestant saved by the public vote
– Contestant saved by coach
– Contestant eliminated

Order	Coach	Contestant	Song	Result
1	Garou	Yoann Fréget	It's a Man's Man's Man's World – James Brown	Saved by the public
2	Garou	Sarah Caillibot	Chère amie – Marc Lavoine	Eliminated
3	Garou	Baptiste Defromont	Goodbye Stranger – Supertramp	Saved by the coach
4	Garou	Stefania Rizou	Tous les cris les S.O.S. – Daniel Balavoine	Eliminated
5	Garou	Ayme	Stairway to Heaven – Led Zeppelin	Eliminated
6	Florent Pagny	Sandy Coops	Je ne vous oublie pas – Céline Dion	Eliminated
7	Florent Pagny	Nuno Resende	Time Is Running Out – Muse	Saved by the coach
8	Florent Pagny	Victoria Petrosillo	Je voulais te dire que je t'attends – Michel Jonasz	Eliminated
9	Florent Pagny	Pierre G	Feel – Robbie Williams	Saved by the public
10	Florent Pagny	Mickael Pouvin	Read All About It – Emeli Sandé	Eliminated
11	Louis Bertignac	Tyssa	Light My Fire – The Doors	Eliminated
12	Louis Bertignac	Nell	Ça me vexe – Mademoiselle K	Eliminated
13	Louis Bertignac	Louane	Les moulins de mon cœur – Michel Legrand	Saved by the public
14	Louis Bertignac	Nungan	Kiss – Prince	Eliminated
15	Louis Bertignac	Cécilia Pascal	Nightcall – Kavinsky	Saved by the coach
16	Jenifer	Rachel Claudio	Girl on Fire – Alicia Keys	Eliminated
17	Jenifer	Anthony Touma	Chanter pour ceux – Michel Berger	Saved by the public
18	Jenifer	Jude Todd	We Are Young – Fun	Eliminated
19	Jenifer	Laura Chab	Le tourbillon – Jeanne Moreau	Saved by the coach
20	Jenifer	Florian Carli	With or Without You – U2	Eliminated

Contestants after two rounds of prime shows

Teams in the first rounds of prime
Garou	Jenifer	Florent Pagny	Louis Bertignac
Emmanuel Djob; Manurey; Yoann Fréget; Baptiste Defromont	Olympe; Sarah Bismuth; Anthony Touma; Laura Chab'	Benjamin Bocconi; Dièse; Pierre G Nuno Resende	Loïs Silvin; Shadoh; Louane; Cécilia Pascal

==== Episode 13 - Prime 3: 27 April 2013 ====
In the Top 16 stage (four for each coach), public vote saves one contestant and the coach saves another of his team, eliminating the remaining two from his team

– Contestant saved by the public vote
– Contestant saved by coach
– Contestant eliminated

Order	Coach	Contestant	Song	Result
1	Jenifer	Anthony Touma	Live and Let Die – Paul McCartney	Saved by the coach
2	Jenifer	Sarah Bismuth	J'traine des pieds – Olivia Ruiz	Eliminated
3	Jenifer	Olympe	Désenchantée – Mylène Farmer	Saved by the public
4	Jenifer	Laura Chab	One Day / Reckoning Song – Asaf Avidan	Saved by the coach
5	Florent Pagny	Pierre G	Le temps des cathédrales – Bruno Pelletier	Eliminated
6	Florent Pagny	Benjamin Bocconi	Bridge over Troubled Water – Simon & Garfunkel	Saved by the coach
7	Florent Pagny	Dièse	I'm Outta Love – Anastacia	Saved by the coach
8	Florent Pagny	Nuno Resende	L'Envie d'aimer – Les Dix commandements	Saved by the public
9	Louis Bertignac	Cécilia Pascal	Comme d'habitude – Claude François	Saved by the coach
10	Louis Bertignac	Louane	Call Me Maybe – Carly Rae Jepsen	saved by the coach
11	Louis Bertignac	Shadoh	Rodéo – Zazie	Eliminated
12	Louis Bertignac	Loïs Silvin	Goodbye My Lover – James Blunt	Saved by the public
13	Garou	Emmanuel Djob	I Can See Clearly Now – Johnny Nash	Saved by the public
14	Garou	Manurey	Le Sud – Nino Ferrer	Eliminated
15	Garou	Baptiste Defromont	Temps à nouveau – Jean-Louis Aubert	Saved by the coach
16	Garou	Yoann Fréget	Vole – Céline Dion	Saved by the coach

List of songs outside competition

Order	Singers	Song
1	The 4 coaches of The Voice (Garou, Louis Bertignac, Florent Pagny, Jenifer)	Allumer le feu – Johnny Hallyday

==== Episode 14 - Prime 4 - Quarter-finals: 4 May 2013 ====
Top 12, with three remaining contestants per team perform with one each saved by the public vote, one saved by coach and one eliminated per team. Eight contestants will remain in competition at the end of the quarter-finals and will tour France at the end of the season.

– Contestant saved by the public vote
– Contestant saved by coach
– Contestant eliminated

Order	Coach	Contestant	Song	Result
1	Florent Pagny	Nuno Resende	Music – John Miles	Saved by the public
2	Florent Pagny	Dièse	Lettre à France – Michel Polnareff	Saved by the coach
3	Florent Pagny	Benjamin Bocconi*	Quand on n'a que l'amour – Jacques Brel	Eliminated
4	Garou	Yoann Fréget	Free – Stevie Wonder	Saved by the coach
5	Garou	Emmanuel Djob	Tears in Heaven – Eric Clapton	Saved by the public
6	Garou	Baptiste Defromont	Hymne à l'amour – Édith Piaf	Eliminated
7	Jenifer	Olympe	Frozen – Madonna	Saved by the public
8	Jenifer	Anthony Touma	Stay – Rihanna feat. Mikky Ekko	Saved by the coach
9	Jenifer	Laura Chab'	Les Histoires d'A. – Rita Mitsouko	Eliminated
10	Louis Bertignac	Loïs Silvin	Éblouie par la nuit – Zaz	Saved by the coach
11	Louis Bertignac	Cécilia Pascal	Seven Nation Army – The White Stripes	Eliminated
12	Louis Bertignac	Louane	Imagine – John Lennon	Saved by the public

*Presence of Fauve Hautot during the performancelors de la chanson

Performances outside competition

Order	Singers	Song
1	The Voice contestants still in show	We Are the World – USA for Africa

Songs outside competition

Order	Singers	Song
1	Florent Pagny and his Team (Nuno Resende, Dièse, Benjamin Bocconi)	Chatelet les Halles – Florent Pagny
2	Garou and his Team (Emmanuel Djob, Yoann Fréget, Baptiste Defromont)	Dancing in the Street
3	Louis Bertignac and his Team (Louane, Cécilia Pascal, Loïs)	Cryin' – Aerosmith
4	Jenifer and his Team (Olympe, Laura Chab, Anthony Touma)	Double je – Christophe Willem

==== Episode 15 - Prime 5 - Semi-finals: 11 May 2013 ====
In the semi-finals and the finals, the two best candidates per team qualify in each team.

Votes are based on 150 points in total: Each coach would place his 50 points between his final 2 contestants. He should not distribute them equally but should give advantage to one of his /her two finalists. The votes of the public will be allocated based on votes for a total of 100 points. One contestant per team reaches the final.

– Contestant qualifies to the final
– Contestant eliminated

Order	Coach	Candidat	Chanson	Public vote results /100	Coach vote results /50	Total points /150	Status
1	Florent Pagny	Nuno Resende	En apesanteur – Calogero	**77.5**	24	**101.5**	Qualified for the final
2	Florent Pagny	Dièse	Promise Me – Beverley Craven	22.5	**26**	48.5	Eliminated
3	Jenifer	Anthony Touma	Les Mots bleus – Christophe	**59.7**	15	74.7	Eliminated
4	Jenifer	Olympe	Non, je ne regrette rien – Édith Piaf	40.3	**35**	**75.3**	Qualified for the final
5	Louis Bertignac	Loïs	When I Was Your Man – Bruno Mars	**52.0**	24	**76.0**	Qualified for the final
6	Louis Bertignac	Louane	Quelqu'un m'a dit – Carla Bruni	48.0	**26**	74.0	Eliminated
8	Garou	Yoann Fréget	Calling You – Jevetta Steele	**58.1**	**27**	**85.1**	Qualified for the final
7	Garou	Emmanuel Djob	Déjeuner en paix – Stephan Eicher	41.9	23	64.9	Eliminated

Performances outside competition

Order	Singers	Song
1	The Voice coaches (Garou, Louis Bertignac, Florent Pagny, Jenifer)	Je t'emmène au vent – Louise Attaque
2	Team Florent Pagny (Nuno Resende and Dièse)	À ma place – Zazie & Axel Bauer
3	Florent Pagny and his Team (Florent Pagny, Nuno Resende and Dièse)	Dans la maison vide – Michel Polnareff
4	Team Jenifer (Olympe and Anthony Touma)	Relax, Take It Easy – Mika
5	Jenifer and her Team (Jenifer, Olympe and Anthony Touma)	Don't Speak – No Doubt
6	Team Louis Bertignac (Loïs and Louane)	Ho Hey – The Lumineers
7	Louis Bertignac and his Team (Louis Bertignac, Loïs and Louane)	Mrs Robinson – Simon & Garfunkel
8	Team Garou (Yoann Fréget and Emmanuel Djob)	Many Rivers to Cross – Jimmy Cliff
9	Garou and his Team (Garou, Yoann Fréget and Emmanuel Djob)	If I Ain't Got You – Alicia Keys

==== Episode 16 - Prime 6 - Finals: 18 May 2013 ====
The final was broadcast live on 18 May 2013. The four finalists, the best in each team would compete against each other for the first and last time during the show, as all previous confrontations were contestants from their own respective teams.

Each finalist would sing four songs each. One with their respective coaches, a song with a well-known artist and two songs in solo (one in French and one in English). Only the public decides the season winner.

Five artists were invited to perform in the finals. Will.i.am performed four songs with all four finalists. The other four, being Lara Fabian, Patrick Bruel, Christophe Maé et Zaz accompanied one of the finalists each in their songs.

Winner of the season would win 150,000 Euros and a contract with an important record label.

At the end, the coaches sang "Stand by Me" from Ben E. King.

The four finalistes sont :

Finalistes
Garou	Jenifer	Florent Pagny	Louis Bertignac
Yoann Fréget	Olympe	Nuno Resende	Loïs

Order	Coach	Finalist	Song	Song as duo	Public vote	Status
1	Florent Pagny	Nuno Resende	The Great Pretender – The Platters	/	25%	Third
8	Florent Pagny	Nuno Resende	Adagio	Lara Fabian	25%	Third
11	Florent Pagny	Nuno Resende	Il suffira d'un signe – Jean Jacques Goldman	/	25%	Third
13	Florent Pagny	Nuno Resende	Memory – Barbra Streisand	Florent Pagny	25%	Third
2	Garou	Yoann Fréget	Dans un autre monde – Céline Dion	/	**28%**	**Winner**
6	Garou	Yoann Fréget	Je veux – Zaz	Zaz	**28%**	**Winner**
10	Garou	Yoann Fréget	Earth Song – Michael Jackson	/	**28%**	**Winner**
16	Garou	Yoann Fréget	Amazing Grace – Traditional gospel	Garou	**28%**	**Winner**
3	Jenifer	Olympe	Si maman si – France Gall	/	27.8%	Runner-up
5	Jenifer	Olympe	Casser La Voix – Patrick Bruel	Patrick Bruel	27.8%	Runner-up
9	Jenifer	Olympe	All By Myself – Céline Dion	/	27.8%	Runner-up
15	Jenifer	Olympe	I Will Always Love You – Whitney Houston	Jenifer	27.8%	Runner-up
4	Louis Bertignac	Loïs	Jeune et con – Damien Saez	/	19.2%	Fourth
7	Louis Bertignac	Loïs	On s'attache – Christophe Maé	Christophe Maé	19.2%	Fourth
12	Louis Bertignac	Loïs	Let It Be – The Beatles	/	19.2%	Fourth
14	Louis Bertignac	Loïs	Angie – The Rolling Stones	Louis Bertignac	19.2%	Fourth

Performances outside competition

Order	Singer	Song
1	The four finalists Olympe, Loïs, Yoann Fréget et Nuno Resende	Angels – Robbie Williams
2	Will.i.am and Yoann Fréget	I Gotta Feeling – The Black Eyed Peas
3	Will.i.am and Nuno Resende	This is Love – Will.i.am feat Eva Simons
4	Will.i.am and Olympe	Scream & Shout – Will.i.am feat Britney Spears
5	Will.i.am and Loïs	thatPower – Will.i.am feat Justin Bieber
