= Samedi Soir on Chante =

- Program logo
- Written by: Fabrice Clerté
- Directed by: Pascal Duchêne
- Presented by: Estelle Denis
- Country of origin: France
- Original language: French
- No. of episodes: 4

Production
- Production location: Saint-Denis
- Cinematography: Jean-Philippe Bourdon
- Camera setup: Multi-camera
- Running time: 121-124 minutes
- Production company: DMLSTV

Original release
- Network: TF1
- Release: January 19, 2013 – present

Samedi Soir on Chante (literally Saturday Evening We Sing) is a French musical television and radio program hosted by Estelle Denis, directed by Pascal Duchêne and broadcast simultaneously on the television channel TF1 and the radio stations RFM (first episode) and RTL (second episode).

The concept of the pre-recorded program, written by Fabrice Clerté, sees a semi-regular troupe of sixteen relatively young yet more or less established singers such as Emmanuel Moire, Corneille and Tal performing over the course of two hours covers of songs written and/or sung by a major French star from an older generation in front of a live studio audience and occasionally accompanied by guest stars, thus potentially reintroducing them to a younger crowd.

Four episodes of the show have been produced and three broadcast so far, centered on Jean-Jacques Goldman, France Gall, the hits of 2013 and Edith Piaf respectively. The first episode was a ratings success for TF1, however the second faltered and lost half of its predecessor's viewers.

Nevertheless, the channel has expressed its faith in the concept with the rapid launch of a spin-off based on comedians, Samedi Soir on Rit (lit. Saturday Evening We Laugh), hosted by Nikos Aliagas and with a first episode shot on June 3, 2013, two days after the broadcast of Samedi Soir on Chante's second episode.

== The Samedi Soir on Chante Troupe ==
| | Jean-Jacques Goldman | France Gall | 2013 Hits | Edith Piaf |
|---|---|---|---|---|
| Alizée | Yes | Yes | No | Yes |
| Chimène Badi | Yes | No | Yes | Yes |
| Amel Bent | Yes | No | Yes | Yes |
| Corneille | Yes | Yes | Yes | Yes |
| Louis Delort | No | No | No | Yes |
| Sofia Essaïdi | Yes | Yes | Yes | Yes |
| Elodie Frégé | No | Yes | Yes | Yes |
| Yoann Fréget | No | Yes | No | No |
| Jenifer | Yes | Yes | No | No |
| Joyce Jonathan | No | Yes | No | Yes |
| Lorie | Yes | Yes | Yes | Yes |
| Mickaël Miro | Yes | Yes | No | Yes |
| Emmanuel Moire | Yes | Yes | Yes | Yes |
| Florent Mothe | Yes | Yes | Yes | Yes |
| Vincent Niclo | No | No | Yes | No |
| Olympe | No | No | Yes | No |
| M. Pokora | Yes | No | Yes | No |
| Merwan Rim | No | Yes | No | Yes |
| Shy'm | Yes | No | No | No |
| Damien Sargue | No | No | Yes | No |
| Natasha St-Pier | Yes | Yes | No | No |
| Tal | Yes | Yes | Yes | Yes |
| Vitaa | No | No | Yes | No |
| Zaz | No | No | Yes | Yes |

== Controversies ==
The program has been accused by some of being a thinly veiled promotional machine aimed at selling recently released albums. Indeed, the first episode, centered on Jean-Jacques Goldman, aired two months after the release of the compilation cover album Génération Goldman and featured many of its singers, such as Amel Bent, Corneille, Emmanuel Moire, Florent Mothe, M. Pokora, Shy'm and Tal, but more importantly the second episode, centered on France Gall, was viewed by many as being nothing more than a giant commercial for Jenifer's France Gall cover album Ma Déclaration, which came out two days after the episode's airing.

In addition, some singers of Génération Goldman, such as Leslie and Marie-Mai were offended at not being invited to participate in the program with Leslie later accusing TF1 of playing favorites with her contemporaries.

As for the artists the show aims to pay homage to, France Gall was particularly angered, as she was with Jenifer's cover album, calling the program "cheap" in an interview with Le Parisien and regretting that she wasn't consulted or even invited to participate.

== Episodes ==
| No. | Featured artist | Directed by | Written by | Radio broadcast | Filming location | Original release date | Filming date | Viewers (millions) | Share |
|---|---|---|---|---|---|---|---|---|---|
| 1 | Jean-Jacques Goldman | Pascal Duchêne | Fabrice Clerté | RFM | Studios de France – Bât 217, Saint-Denis | January 19, 2013 | December 17, 2012 | 6.74 | 29,4% |
| 2 | France Gall | Pascal Duchêne | Fabrice Clerté | RTL | Studios du Lendit, Saint-Denis | June 1, 2013 | May 29, 2013 | 3.5 | 16,4% |
| 3 | Hits of 2013 | Unknown | Unknown | TBA | Studios de France – Bât 217, Saint-Denis | January 3, 2014 | December 8–9, 2013 | N/A | TBA |
| 4 | Edith Piaf | Pascal Duchêne | Fabrice Clerté | TBA | Studios du Lendit, Saint-Denis | January 17, 2014 | May 31, 2013 | N/A | TBA |
