= Rachel Claudio =

Australian musician and DJ

Claudio
- Born: Rachel Claudio; Perth, Australia
- Origin: Perth
- Genres: Pop; Electronica
- Occupation(s): Singer/songwriter, DJ
- Instrument(s): Piano, keyboard, synthesizer
- Years active: 2006-present

Rachel Claudio is a singer/songwriter, DJ, and live performing musical artist from Perth, Australia.

== Early life ==
Claudio was born and raised in Perth with an Italian heritage. After establishing herself as a DJ in Perth she moved to Paris, aged around 23.

She performs her music by singing, sampling and mixing live while manipulating an array of musical production technology. Claudio's grandfather impressed her with a fondness for musical styles such as Italian opera and The Beatles, and she spent a portion of her childhood indoors with piano music, playing and composing.

== Career ==
Claudio has performed for artistic productions such as The Luxury of Landscape, a multi-discipline art installation in Florence, Italy, featuring floral art, photography, music and fashion. Claudio contributed to Luxury of Landscape with a group of artists selected and led by fashion designer and financier Aneka Manners, but alas did not appear at the installation in person, claiming to be "too pregnant to fly" at the time. Claudio appeared on the French TF1 television channel version of The Voice where she received a standing ovation for singing "Message in a Bottle" by Police.

A TEDxPerth live performance and speech by Claudio about translating emotions into sound has received almost 1 million views between February 2017 and March 2020.

Claudio travels the world performing and supporting many popular music acts. Her style of performance is achieved by electronic live sampling with keyboards, creating beats and backing music on the fly and combining them with her singing. As of 2006, Claudio lives in Paris, France.

== Discography ==
=== Albums ===
Title	Details
To Kill An Empath	Released: April 2019; Label: The Ayems; Format: Digital
ii:Nocturne	Released: November 2017; Label: CLAUDIO; Format: Digital
Claudiography	Released: September 2011; Label: Kromatik; Format: CD DD
Thrill of the Game	Released: March 2014; Label: La Source Mastering; Format: CD DD

=== Extended plays ===
Title	Details
Utterance	Released: June 2011; Label: Kromatik; Format: CD DD

== Awards ==
=== WAM Song of the Year ===
The WAM Song of the Year was formed by the Western Australian Rock Music Industry Association Inc. (WARMIA) in 1985, with its main aim to develop and run annual awards recognising achievements within the music industry in Western Australia.

Year	Nominee / work	Award	Result (wins only)
2006	"These Times"	Electronic/Dance	Won
