= Luc Arbogast =

French musician and singer, songwriter

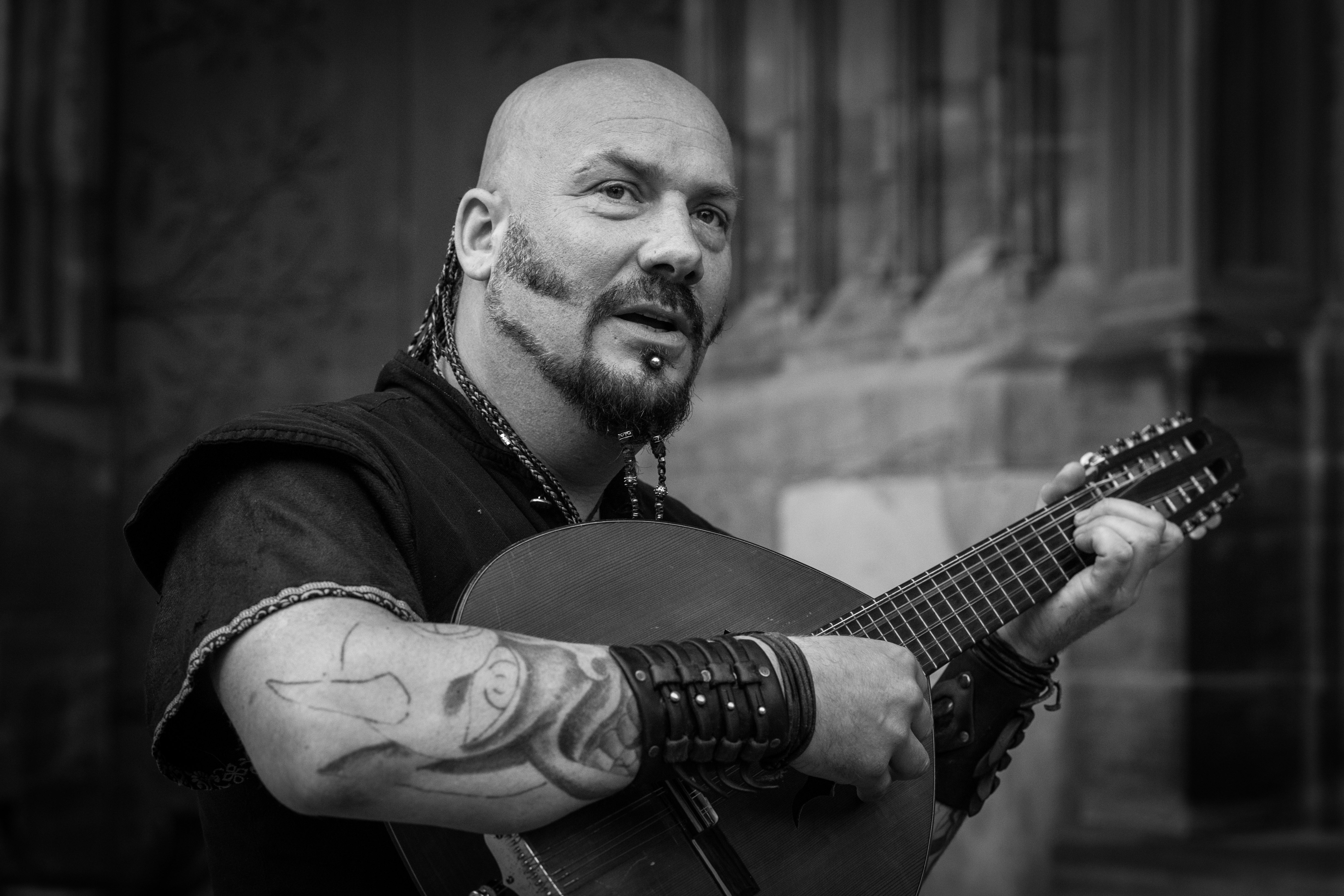
- Luc Arbogast (2016)

Background information
- Born: 2 November 1975 (age 50); La Rochelle, France
- Genres: Medieval music
- Occupation: Singer-songwriter
- Instruments: Vocals, Irish bouzouki, keyboard
- Years active: 2002–present
- Label: CP Records
- Website: www.lucarbogast.fr

Luc Arbogast (born in La Rochelle, France on 2 November 1975) is a French musician and singer-songwriter. He was a contestant in season 2 of the French television talent competition The Voice: la plus belle voix. After the show, he was signed to Mercury Records, a Universal Music Division.

== Beginnings ==
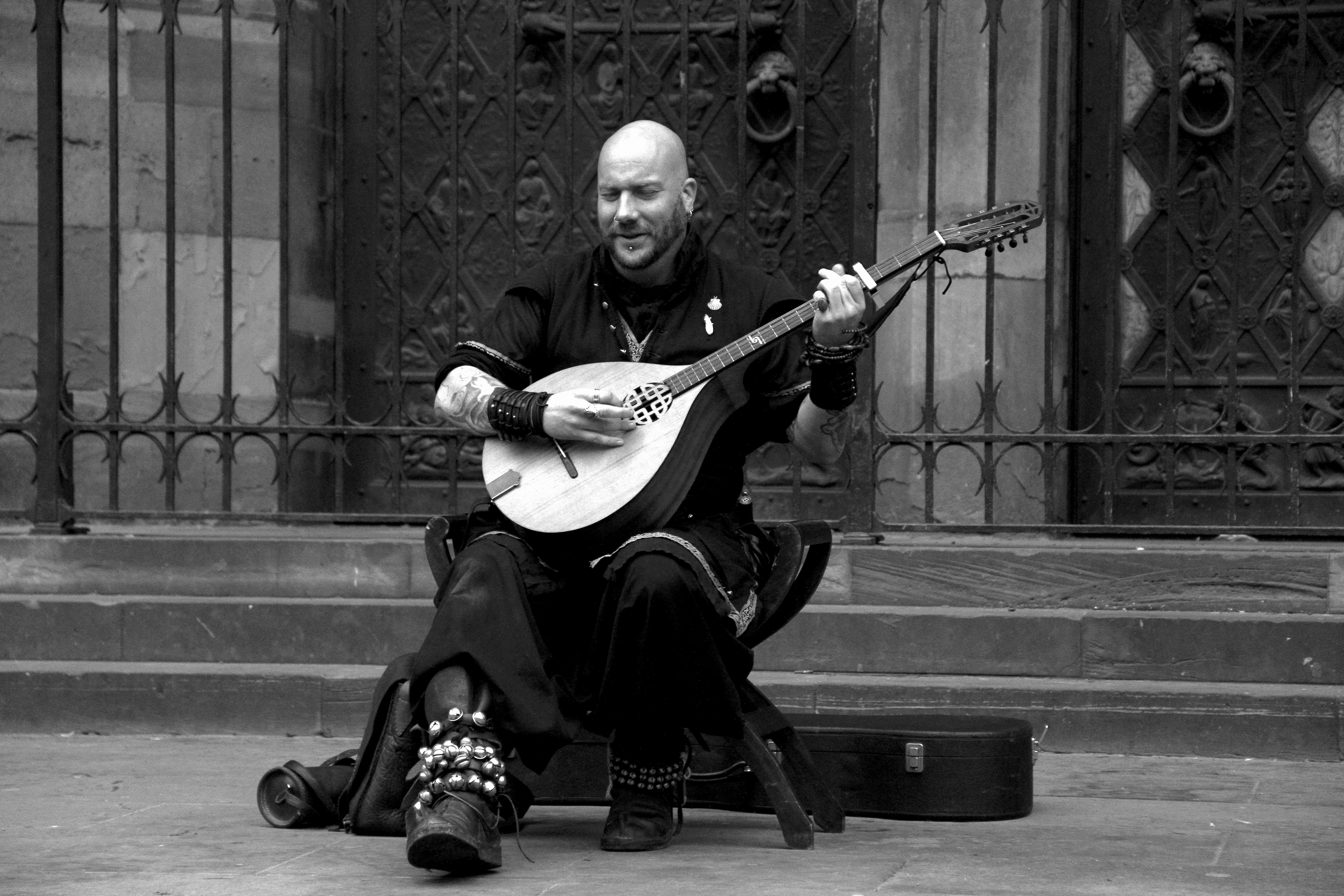
Luc Arbogast performing in front of the Notre Dame Cathedral of Strasbourg

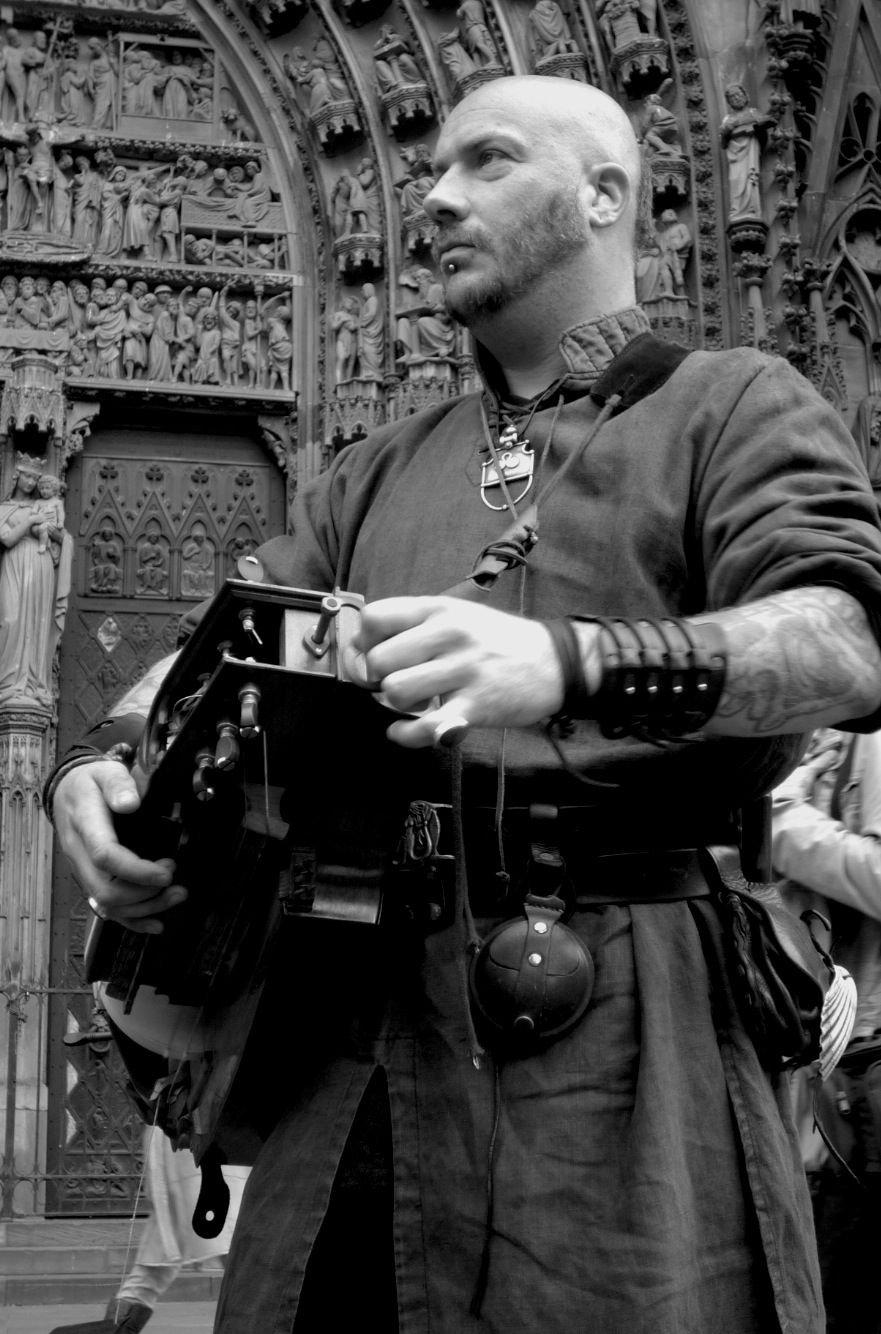
Luc Arbogast (2011)

Arbogast's father was a military man originating from Strasbourg, and his mother a nurse of German origin. He grew up in Égaux de Landrais, dans in Aigrefeuille-d'Aunis region, south-east of La Rochelle. In 1985 when he was just 10, the family moved to Alsace, in the Munster Valley. Luc went to the communal school of Metzeral, and then Collège Frédéric Hartmann in Munster. He became proficient in the Alsacien dialect. He also started playing the guitar and at a young age took part in musical events, notably in the light and sound show Transhumance that told the history of Val Saint-Grégoire. He continued his secondary schooling at Lycée Frédéric Kirschleger in Munster, and studied shoemaking.

Following early traditional music, the self-taught Arbogast started singing medieval songs accompanied by traditional instruments, notably Irish bouzouki, guitar and bells. His repertoire is inspired by music by Cantigas de Santa Maria, songs from German lyric poet Walther von der Vogelweide, German mystical works of Hildegard of Bingen and from French composer Guillaume de Machaut amongst others. Starting in 1996, he worked as a busker choosing locations near cathedrals and town squares and took part in various festival dedicated to traditional medieval music all over France. Beginning in 2003, he started releasing limited edition independent albums like Fjall d'yr Vinur (2003), Domus (2004), Hortus Dei (2007) and Aux Portes de Sananda (2009). He took up a professional musical career in 2011. In 2012, he released the album Canticum in Terra. Artists participating included Mélinda Bressan on the Western concert flute, Aliocha Regnard on violin and nyckelharpa, Jean Louis Renou on percussions, and Sarah Picaud on backing vocals.

== In The Voice, la plus belle voix ==
In 2013, Luc Arbogast took part in season 2 of the French reality television competition The Voice, la plus belle voix with all four judges (Garou, Jenifer, Florent Pagny and Louis Bertignac) turning their chairs around. He picked Jenifer as his mentor. He won the battle round against fellow Team Jenifer competitor Thomas Vaccari and reached the live rounds.

Performances

- Blind audition (Episode 1, 2 February 2013): "Canción sefaradí" (short version)
- Battle round (Episode 7, 16 March 2013): "Mad World" from Tears for Fears as duo with fellow contestant Thomas Vaccari (Moved to live rounds)
- Live round 1 (Episode 11, 13 April 2013): "Adagio in G minor" by Remo Giazotto (Eliminated by public vote)

Other performances for the show

- Moulins du Grizzly Tour, 14 March 2013): "Ces Idées Là" – duo by Louis Bertignac and Luc Arbogast

== After The Voice ==
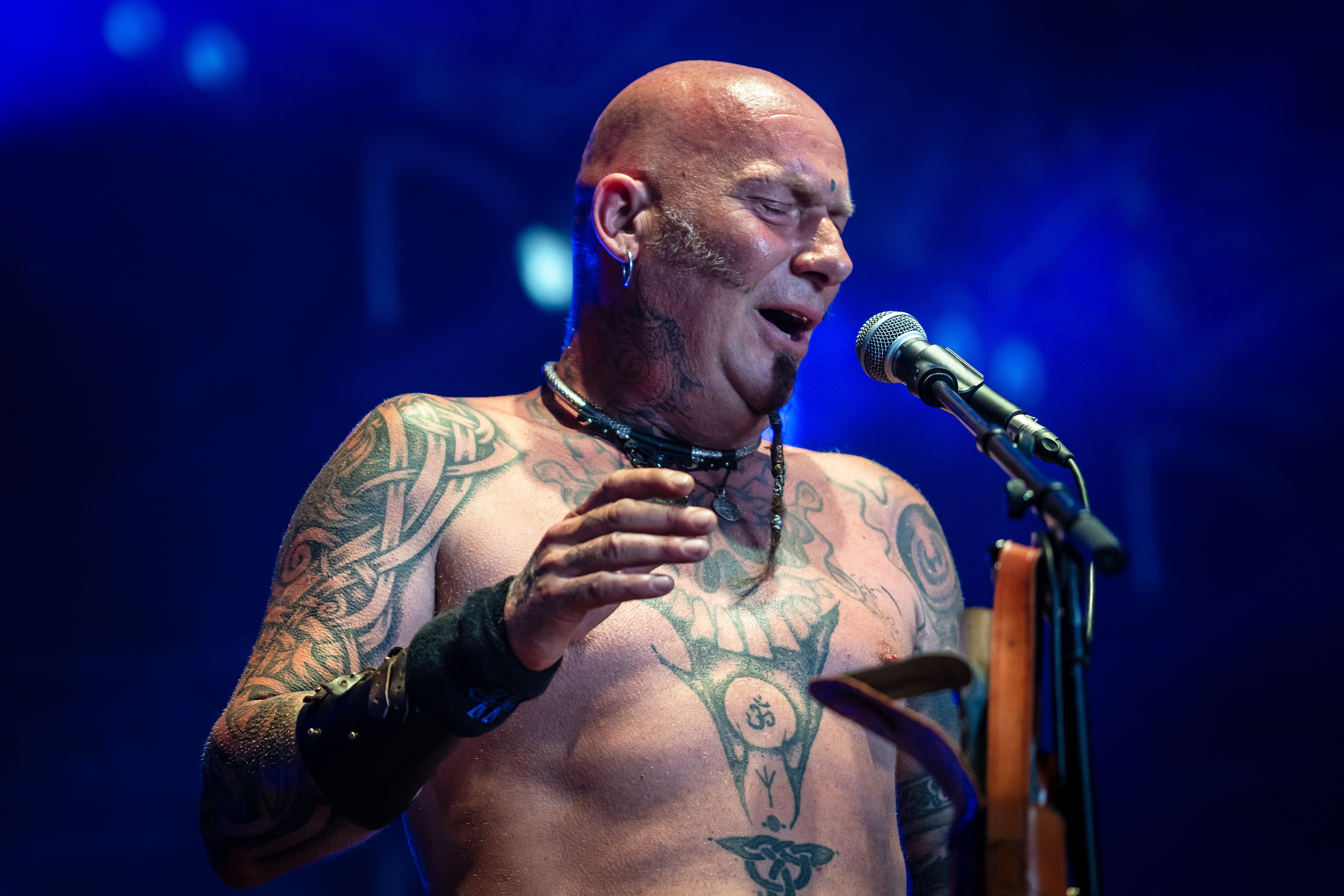
Luc Arbogast at Hellfest, 2025.

Despite being eliminated early in the competition, Arbogast proved popular with the French public with his 2013 album Odysseus entered the SNEP French Albums Chart straight in at No. 1.

== In popular culture ==
During the World Figure Skating Championships held in Nice in 2012, French figure skating champion Brian Joubert skated with Luc Arbogast's song "An Freij de An Neo Era". During the gala Les Étoiles de la glisse in Courchevel on 30 December 2012, Arbogast accompanied him live, singing his song "Canción Sefaradí".

== Discography ==
=== Albums ===
Year	Album	Peak positions			Certification	Notes
Year	Album	FR	BEL (Wa)	SWI	Certification	Notes
2003	Fjall d'yr Vinur	–	–	–		Track list: 1. "Rupella"; 2. "Ker An Mon"; 3. "Eleanor"; 4. "Salderalladon"; 5. "Dona Lombarda"; 6. "Cantate Mayor"; 7. "Lilly"; 8. "Ielijk"
2004	Domus	–	–	–		Track list: 1. "Cantate mayor" 2. "Selena"; 3. "Wenderlukia"; 4. "Salderalladon"; 5. "Nouchka"; 6. "La danse de l'ours (ou cercle circassien)" 7. "Maria (valse)" 8. "Aquitan"; 9. "Domus"; 10. "Unte de Lind"; 11. "Tarentella"; 12. "Gentils galants de France"; 13. "Lukul Scottanz (Scottish)"
2007	Hortus Dei	–	–	–		Track list: 1. "Morgenstern"; 2. "La Rosa Enflorece"; 3. "La Valse du Miroir"; 4. "In Memoriam Alesia (valse)" 5. "Palastina Lied"; 6. "Dama De Cataluna"; 7. "Non Sofre Santa Maria (bourrée)" 8. "Beold De Mai"; 9. "Entre Moi Et Mon Ami"; 10. "Unicornus"; 11. "Hortus Dei"; 12. "Ange"
2009	Aux Portes de Sananda	–	–	–		Track list: 1. "Asag"; 2. "Stella Splendens"; 3. "Mahalïa"; 4. "An Freij De An Neo Era"; 5. "Canción Sefaradi"; 6. "Entededor"; 7. "Darjeeling Caravan"; 8. "Aux Portes de Sananda"; 9. "Prima Mezura"; 10. "Luix in Himmel"; 11. "Les Egaux de Landrais"; 12. "Ora & Labora"
2012	Canticum in Terra	–	–	–		Track list: 1. "Cant del matin" 2. "Aurora borealis" 3. "Funtan de jovencia" 4. "La daumasane" 5. "Haxaplatz am samain" 6. "Aux quatre vents" 7. "Ars Moriendi"; 8. "Chrisalied"; 9. "L'herbe d'ongrie" 10. "Oj Dortn"; 11. "Du côté des Anges"; 12. "Ad mortem festinamus"
2013	Odysseus	1	3	39		Track list: 1. "Cant de Gévaudan"; 2. "Terra Incognita"; 3. "Nausicaa (la moldau)" 4. "Le roy a fait battre tambour" 5. "Akhenahema"; 6. "Yelahiah"; 7. "Bowen's Barley Field"; 8. "Eden (l'Adagio d'Albinoni)"; 9. "Mad World"; 10. "Le Grand Coureur"
2014	Oreflam	5	13	74		Track list: 1. "Vox clamantis" (3:21); 2. "Game of Thrones" (Main Title Theme) (2:57); 3. "Antealtares" (3:55); 4. "Le bal des ardents" (3:23); 5. "Mjöllnir" (4:24); 6. "Doléances d'une promise de saintes colombes" (3:05); 7. "Oreflam" (4:22); 8. "Ad silentia luna amica mea" (3:45); 9. "Complainte au duc de Savoye" (3:53); 10. "Maelancholia" (3:57); 11. "Sentinel (Ultimum cantum arborum)" (4:09); 12. "Cantica coelestis" (3:54); 13. "Ultima nocte" (3:36); 14. "Ja nuns hons pris" (4:17) (only in Limited Edition); 15. "Veillée des oiseleurs" (with Marie de Malicorne) (3:46) (only in Limited Edition)
2016	Metamorphosis	29	78			Track list: 1. "Ad Mortem Festinamus" (4:30); 2. "Metamorphosis" (3:07); 3. "Danza Ex Machina" (3:01); 4. "Mandragora" (3:09); 5. "Tempus Fugit" (4:07); 6. "Ursae (Ursae Majoris)" (3:17); 7. "O Fortuna" 3:01; 8. "Liberta" (3:07); 9. "Oniris (Hortus Deliciarum) (4:09); 10. "Nomad" (3:59)

=== Singles ===
Year	Single	Peak positions	Certification	Album
Year	Single	FR	Certification	Album
2013	"Cancion Sefaradi"	71		

Other releases

- 2013: "Nausicaa (la Moldau)" (FR #84)
- 2013: "Eden (l'adagio d'Albinoni)" (FR #144)
- 2013: "Mad World" (FR #176)
