= Raymond Domenech =

French footballer and manager (born 1952)

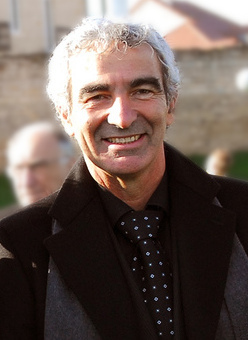
- Domenech in 2007

Personal information
- Full name: Raymond Manuel Albert Domenech
- Date of birth: 24 January 1952 (age 74)
- Place of birth: Lyon, France
- Height: 1.79 m (5 ft 10 in)
- Position: Full-back

Senior career*
Years	Team	Apps	(Gls)
1969–1977	Lyon	246	(7)
1977–1981	Strasbourg	128	(4)
1981–1982	Paris Saint-Germain	19	(1)
1982–1984	Bordeaux	40	(3)
1984–1985	Mulhouse	13	(0)
Total		433	(15)

International career
1973–1979	France	8	(0)

Managerial career
- 1984–1988: Mulhouse
- 1988–1993: Lyon
- 1993–2004: France U21
- 1996: France Olympic
- 2004–2010: France
- 2016: Brittany
- 2020–2021: Nantes
Medal record
Men's football
Representing France (as manager)
FIFA World Cup
Runner-up	2006
UEFA European Under-21 Championship
Runner-up	2002
Third place	1996
- * Club domestic league appearances and goals

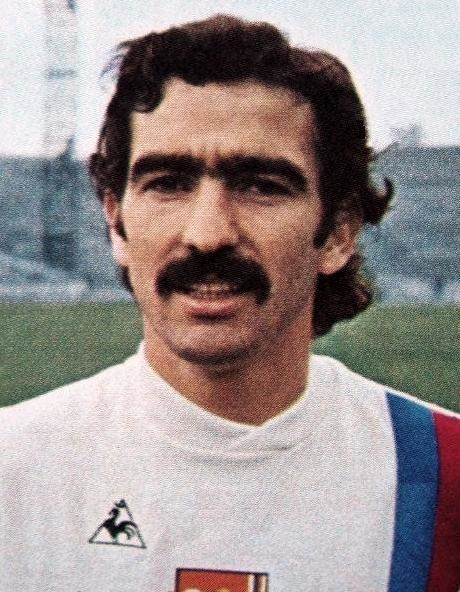
Domenech in 1976

Raymond Manuel Albert Domenech (born 24 January 1952) is a French football manager and former player. He managed the France national team from 2004 to 2010, reaching the 2006 FIFA World Cup final. He was dismissed after their elimination from the 2010 FIFA World Cup, for serious misconduct.

== Managerial career ==
=== France U-21 national team ===
Domenech replaced Marc Bourrier as coach of the France national under-21 football team in 1993.

His first major tournament was the 1994 UEFA European Under-21 Championship, which France hosted. France had qualified after topping their group in qualification, nine points above second-placed Sweden. At the tournament, France defeated Russia in the quarter-finals but lost to Italy in a penalty shootout at the semifinal stage. Italy went on to win the final against Portugal.

France qualified for the 1996 UEFA European Under-21 Championship after finishing first in their qualifying group. France defeated Germany in the quarter-finals. Italy again knocked out the French side at the semi-final stage, the lone goal coming from Francesco Totti. Italy retained their title, defeating Spain in the final.

After finishing third at the 1996 UEFA European Under-21 Championship, France qualified for the 1996 Olympics as one of the top five European nations. France finished top of their group with victories over Australia and Saudi Arabia, and a draw with Spain. At the quarter-finals, France were eliminated 2–1 by Portugal after a golden goal was scored from the penalty spot by José Calado.

France failed to qualify for the 1998 UEFA European Under-21 Championship after finishing second in their qualifying group behind Norway. France's final game of qualifying was at home against Norway, with France having needed at least a draw to top their group. Norway produced a 3–2 upset win to qualify above France. Norway went on to finish third at the tournament after being eliminated by champions Spain in the semi-finals.

Domenech was again unsuccessful in qualifying for the 2000 UEFA European Under-21 Championship. This time France topped their qualifying group and progressed to the playoffs, where they were drawn against Italy. The first leg in France ended 1–1, and the second leg in Italy ended 1–1 after 90 minutes. The game went into extra time where Andrea Pirlo produced the winning goal for Italy in the 110th minute. Italy would go on to be champions at the 2000 UEFA European Under-21 Championship.

Domenech briefly coached the France national under-20 football team at the 2001 FIFA World Youth Championship. During the group stage, France defeated Iran, and had draws with Paraguay and Ghana. France progressed from the group stage after finishing second behind Ghana. France defeated Germany 3–2 in the Round of 16 thanks to a goal from Djibril Cissé in the 90+3rd minute. France were eliminated in the quarter-finals after a 3–1 loss to hosts and eventual champions Argentina.

France qualified for the 2002 UEFA European Under-21 Championship after finishing first in their qualifying group and defeating Romania in the play-offs. France were undefeated during qualifying. France won all their group matches at the tournament against Czech Republic, Belgium and Greece. France progressed to the final after defeating Switzerland in their semifinal. France met Czech Republic again, but this time the Czech side were victorious in a penalty shootout after the game ended at 0–0 after extra time.

France were dominant in the group stage of qualifying for the 2004 UEFA European Under-21 Championship. They finished first in their group with seven wins, one draw, no losses and no goals conceded. They were drawn against Portugal in the play-offs and won the first leg in Portugal 2–1. However, Portugal won 2–1 away from home in the second leg, sending the game to extra time. Djibril Cissé had been sent off just before halftime. There were no goals in extra time, so the match was decided by a penalty shootout. Portugal won the shootout, with their final penalty kick being scored by Cristiano Ronaldo. Portugal would go on to finish third at the 2004 UEFA European Under-21 Championship.

=== France senior national team ===
==== 2006 World Cup ====
On 12 July 2004, Domenech was a surprise choice to succeed Jacques Santini after the country's disappointing exit from UEFA Euro 2004 by losing in the quarter-final match to the eventual tournament-upset winners Greece. He beat the two other shortlisted candidates, Jean Tigana and Laurent Blanc.

France struggled in the qualifiers, even though the team was seeded in a group that included the relatively unheralded teams of Israel and Switzerland. Domenech persuaded Claude Makélélé, Lilian Thuram and Zidane, members of France's "golden generation", out of international retirement to aid the national team. It paid off and they qualified for the finals. On the final day of fixtures, France qualified automatically with a 4–0 home win over Cyprus.

Domenech fell out with Vikash Dhorasoo after he made a behind the scenes film called Substitute. His decision to leave out Barcelona star Ludovic Giuly in favour of Franck Ribéry, and subsequent refusal to explain that decision, left many French players and fans mystified. Domenech's selection for France's World Cup squad was further criticised when he publicly announced that Fabien Barthez would start ahead of Lyon goalkeeper Grégory Coupet. This decision was met with derision in the French press and also led to Coupet walking out of the national squad before the tournament, although he later returned. Domenech also excluded Roma centre-back Philippe Mexès from his 2006 and 2008 squads, taking along the likes of Jean-Alain Boumsong in his place.

France had a slow start in the World Cup, recording draws against Switzerland and South Korea before finally defeating Togo. France then knocked out Spain, Brazil, and Portugal. France lost the final to Italy in a penalty shoot-out following a 1–1 draw after extra time. Recalled golden generation veterans Zidane and Thuram earned spots on the All-Star Team, with Zidane being awarded the Golden Ball for the best player of the tournament despite receiving a red card in the final (the voting was done before Zidane received the red card).

==== Euro 2008 ====
On 27 August 2007, Claude Makélélé's club manager, José Mourinho, stated that Domenech was treating Makélélé "like a slave," since Domenech had called him up for Euro 2008 qualifiers even though Makélélé had announced his retirement after the 2006 World Cup. Domenech responded: "As long as he can walk, he will play. I have the right to pick him." France ended up last in their UEFA Euro 2008 Group C and failed to advance in the tournament after losing to Italy 2–0.

Domenech proposed on live television to his girlfriend Estelle Denis after France's elimination. He later admitted that this was unprofessional.

==== 2010 World Cup ====
France qualified for the 2010 FIFA World Cup only after defeating the Republic of Ireland in a play-off. The game was controversial, as Thierry Henry handled the ball before setting up William Gallas to score the winning goal.

In the first game of the finals, France drew with Uruguay 0–0. Following their draw with Uruguay, Zidane described Domenech as having lost control of the team. The draw was then followed by a 2–0 defeat to Mexico, during which striker Nicolas Anelka reportedly directed an expletive-laden tirade at Domenech. Anelka was dismissed from the team the next day. The day after Anelka's dismissal, team captain Patrice Evra and team trainer Robert Duverne had a heated confrontation that caused Domenech to physically restrain Duverne; the players responded by returning to the team bus and refusing to continue with practice. After the French Football Federation condemned the player boycott, the team returned to practice without further incident. France's World Cup campaign ended with a 2–1 defeat to hosts South Africa, meaning Les Bleus finished at the bottom of Group A without winning a single game. Domenech bowed out by refusing to shake the hand of South Africa's coach Carlos Alberto Parreira.

Domenech was dismissed for serious misconduct following the World Cup. He sought €2.9 million compensation, eventually receiving €975,000.

=== Later career ===
In November 2010, Domenech began coaching the under-11 team at Boulogne-Billancourt. In December 2011, Domenech donated €70,000 of his €150,000 World Cup bonus to the club, with the remaining €80,000 being donated to charity and an inner-city football club from Paris.

In April 2018, he was one of 77 applicants for the vacant Cameroon national team job. In December 2020, he expressed a wish to succeed Ljubiša Tumbaković as the Serbia national team coach.

On 26 December 2020, ten years after last managing a team, Domenech signed with Ligue 1 side Nantes. On 10 February 2021, Domenech was released of his duties as head coach after not winning a single game in his eight matches in charge.

== Personal life ==
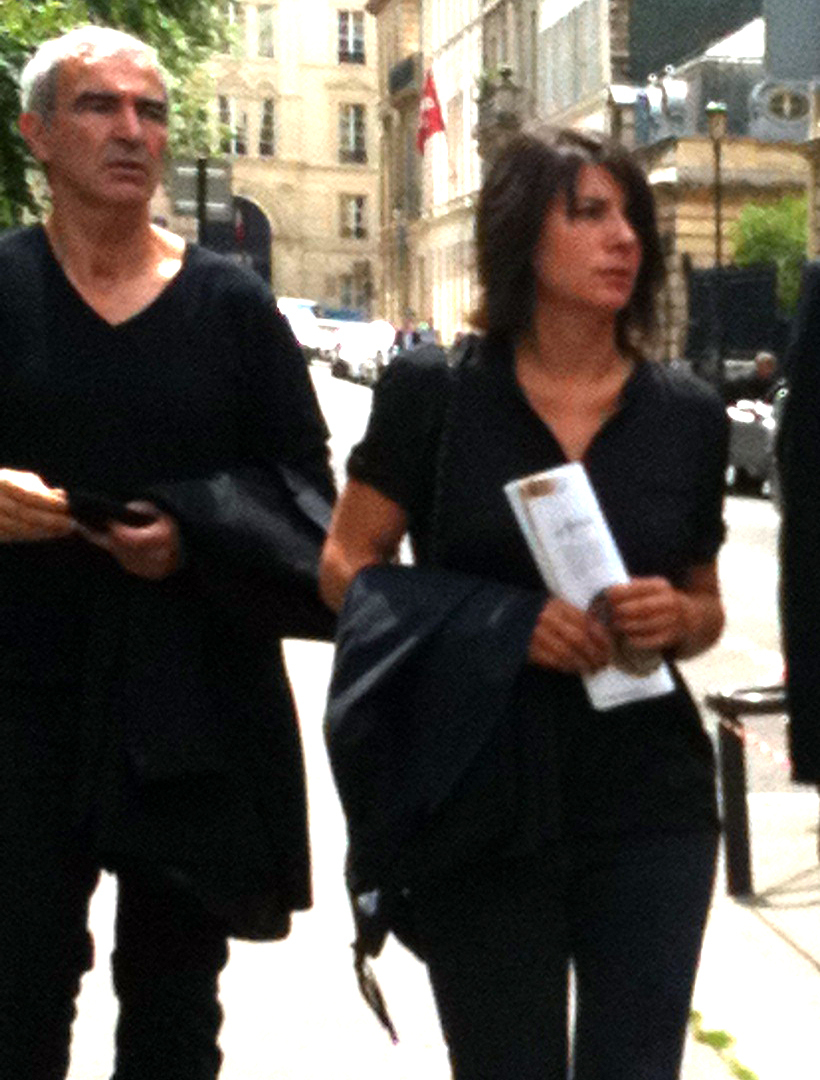
Domenech with his then-fianceé Estelle Denis in 2012

Domenech was previously in a civil relationship with French TV presenter Estelle Denis, whom he met at the studios of channel Infosport+. Domenech proposed to Denis on live television on 17 June 2008, after France's elimination from UEFA Euro 2008. The couple have two children, a daughter born in 2004 and a son born in 2007. The couple separated in 2020.

Domenech is of Catalan descent. He is fascinated by astrology, and believes that people's personalities are shaped by star signs. He has denied rumours that he picked squads based on astrology, or that he dropped Robert Pires for being a Scorpio, instead saying that the 30-year-old Arsenal winger was declining and a bad influence on the squad.

== Managerial statistics ==
As of match played 10 February 2021

Managerial record by team and tenure
Team	From	To	Record				
Team	From	To	G	W	D	L	Win %
Mulhouse	1 July 1984	30 June 1988	169	93	40	36	55.03
Lyon	1 July 1988	30 June 1993	202	73	62	67	36.14
France U21	1 July 1993	11 July 2004	124	76	30	18	61.29
France	12 July 2004	30 June 2010	79	41	24	14	51.90
Nantes	26 December 2020	10 February 2021	8	0	4	4	0.00
Total			582	283	160	139	48.63

== Honours ==
=== Manager ===
France

- FIFA World Cup runner-up: 2006
- UEFA European Under-21 Championship runner-up: 2002; third place: 1996

=== Orders ===
- Officer of the National Order of Merit: 2007
