= Estelle Denis =

French journalist and television presenter

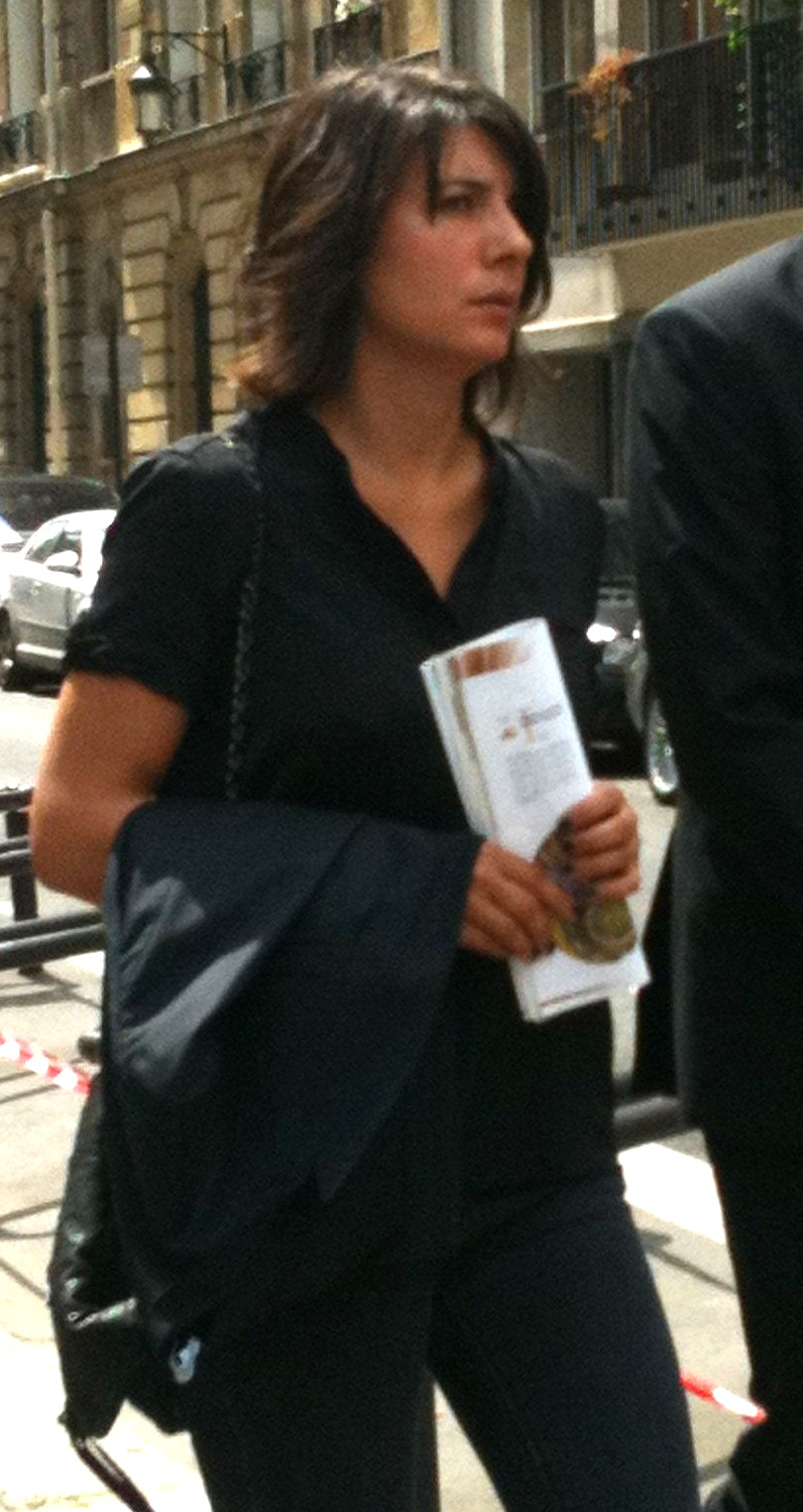
- Denis in 2012
- Born: 6 December 1976 (age 49); Paris, France
- Occupations: Journalist, television presenter
- Years active: 1996–present
- Television: 100% Foot; 100% Mag; Samedi soir, on chante… Splash: le grand plongeon
- Partner: Raymond Domenech (2003-2020)
- Children: 2

Estelle Denis (born 6 December 1976) is a French journalist and television presenter.

== Early life and education ==
Estelle Denis was born in Paris but spent her childhood in Le Coudray-Montceaux, a town in the department of Essonne.

In 1994, she obtained her high school final exam and then studied at the CELSA Paris. In 1996, she studied journalism in Bordeaux. After two years of training and an internship at France Inter, she is hired by France 2 for the 1998 Football World Cup. The same year, she became a journalist for the sports channel Infosport+.

== Career ==
She began her career as a television presenter in 1999, and then presented in 2001 20 h Foot and Prolongations on TPS Star. In 2002, she started presenting the first direct programs of the Ligue 1 commented by Jean-Philippe Goron and Raymond Domenech who were then replaced by Christophe Josse and Jean-Luc Arribart in 2004. That same year, she joined the team of presenters of Téléfoot on TF1 and On refait le match on RTL.

In 2005, the channel M6 suggested her to present the new soccer program 100% Foot. She hosted with the same team 100% Coupe du monde, a talk-show about the events during the 2006 Football World Cup in Germany. In 2006, she hosted Le Tournoi des as on Paris Première, a poker tournament that opposed celebrities and professionals of the game. In 2007, she appeared in the series Off Prime with the Belgian presenter and comedian Virginie Efira, portraying her own role.

Since February 2008, she presents 100% Mag on M6, a daily program about celebrities and subjects about society.

In June 2009, she finished in 203rd place in the World Series of Poker Main Event, winning $37,000 in the most prestigious poker tournament in the world.

In 2010, she presented with Jérôme Anthony and Camille Combal the program Nouvelle Star, ça continue, broadcast just after the primes of the reality program Nouvelle Star.

In September 2012, she left M6 and 100% Mag to join TF1 and present a weekly program. She began on 19 January 2013 with Samedi Soir on Chante, a new program dedicated for the first episode to the repertoire of Jean-Jacques Goldman. On 8 February, she returned on TF1 to co-host a new game show title Splash : le grand plongeon (French version of Celebrity Splash!) with Julie Taton and Gérard Vivès. On 8 March, she participated at the game show Le Grand Concours des animateurs on TF1 and won the contest.

== Personal life ==
Denis was previously married to French footballer and manager Raymond Domenech, whom she met at the studios of channel Infosport+. Domenech proposed to Denis on live television on 17 June 2008, after France's elimination from UEFA Euro 2008. The couple have two children, a daughter born in 2004 and a son born in 2007. The couple separated in 2020.

Denis is now in a relationship with sailor Marc Thiercelin.
