= Olympe (singer) =

French singer

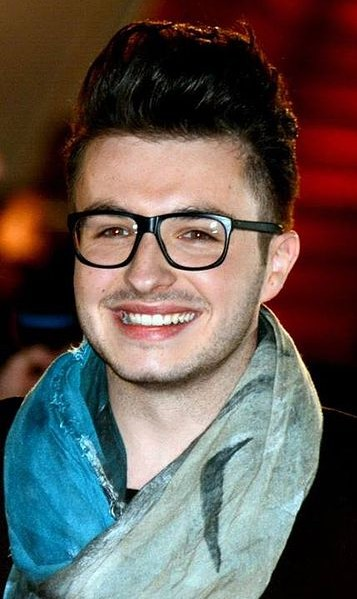
- Olympe in 2013

Background information
- Born: Joffrey Boulanger; 18 August 1989 (age 37); Amiens, France
- Genre: Pop music
- Instrument: Piano
- Years active: 2010–present
- Labels: Mercury Records, Universal Music Group
- Website: OlympeMusic.com

Joffrey Boulanger (born 18 August 1989), better known by his stage name Olympe, is a French singer originating from Amiens, France. He was a contestant in the French television show The Voice: la plus belle voix.

== Beginnings ==
Bolanger's parents separated when he was just 5 and he was raised alongside his brother and sister by his paternal grandparents. A timid child, he found solace in music. In 2001, his grandparent enrolled him in a song contest that he won after singing a Celine Dion song. He went on to take part in about 15 various competitions winning many. After a casting in April 2007, he was invited to sing "Vivo per lei" in a duo with Hélène Ségara during a concert in Albert, Somme.

In 2010, under the name Joffrey B, he released his first studio album recording titled Rien qu'un homme on small C Du Lourd label. The label that had the rights reissued the album February 2013. A music video was also released on the occasion for the song "Par la fenêtre". Based on this success, he took part in a television competition Vous avez du talent! on IDF1 channel where he sang "Je vis comme je rêve", one of the original recordings from his album Rien qu'un homme.

I 2013, he also landed a role in the musical comedy Atlantéa 2013 - Du Sphinx à l'Atlantide.

== The Voice: la plus belle voix ==
At age 23, he auditioned for the program's second season in 2013 singing "Born to Die" from Lana Del Rey and became part of Team Jenifer. His rendition appeared at #1 on the French iTunes charts for the week. Reaching the final, he finished runner-up to eventual winner Yoann Fréget.

== After The Voice ==
After the show, he was signed to Mercury Records (France) label where he released his self-titled debut album Olympe on 22 July 2013 with the album reaching number 1 on SNEP, the official French Albums Chart. The album was composed of studio versions of his interpretations during the season on the show plus one new song titled "Merci".

In December 2013, he sang on the compilation We Love Disney in a duet with Joyce Jonathan. He was invited to the 2014 NRJ Music Awards where he sang a duet with Alex Hepburn.

A new studio album followed in May 2014 titled Une vie par jour. The debut single from the album was 'C'est facile" accompanied with a music video. He will tour France for promotion of the album including a gig in Trianon in Paris.

== Discography ==
=== Albums ===
Year	Album	Peak positions				Certification	Notes
Year	Album	FR	BEL (Vl)	BEL (Wa)	SUI	Certification	Notes
2010	Rien qu'un homme (credited as Joffrey B)	–	–	–	–		
2013	Olympe	1	139	8	60		Track list: 1. "Born to Die" (4:19); 2. "Hometown Glory" (3:36); 3. "Zombie" (3:19); 4. "Désenchantée" (4:36); 5. "Frozen" (4:44); 6. "Si maman si" (3:11); 7. "I Will Always Love You" (4:29); 8. "Merci" (3:52)
2014	Une vie par jour	18	–	31	–		Track list: 1. "Une vie par jour" (3:16); 2. "Je veux tout" (3:02); 3. "Funambule" (3:07); 4. "C'est facile" (3:40); 5. "Trouver les mots" (2:57); 6. "Les nuits noires (We Got Us)" (3:14); 7. "Bien avant les larmes" (3:32); 8. "Les heures un peu tard" (3:42); 9. "Depuis peu" (4:12); 10. "Nos yeux d'enfants" (3:35); 11. "Superstar" (2:55); 12. "Une saison en enfer" (3:14)

=== Singles ===
Year	Singles	Peak positions		Album
Year	Singles	FR	BEL (Wa)	Album
2013	"Born to Die"	9	21	Olympe
2013	"Zombie"	75	–	Olympe
2013	"C'est facile"	70	–	TBA
2016	"Si demain"	94	–	TBA
2016	"Olympe"	100	–	TBA

Other charted songs

Year	Singles	Peak positions	Album
Year	Singles	FR	Album
2013	"Frozen"	72	Olympe
2013	"Non, je ne regrette rien"	162	Non-album release
2013	"Désenchantée"	91	Olympe
2013	"Si maman si"	165	Olympe
2013	"Hometown Glory"	191	Olympe
