= Maeva Méline =

French singer and actress

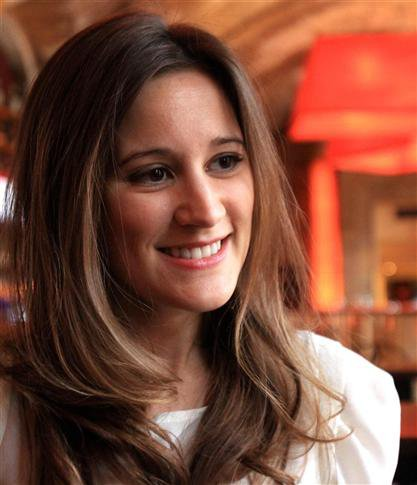

Background information
- Born: Paris, France
- Genres: Pop, folk
- Occupations: Singer, songwriter, musician, actress
- Instruments: Vocals, guitar, piano
- Label: Warner
- Website: maevameline.com

Maeva Méline is a French singer and actress.

== Early life ==
Influenced by pop and folk, she took lessons in piano, self-taught guitar playing and singing. She graduated law school. She starting performing in a jazz and funk band at small venues in Paris, drawing the attention of Warner Music Group, which offered her a record deal on their label. In 2008, Méline was cast for the role of Nannerl in the highly acclaimed French musical Mozart, l'opéra rock, which brought her worldwide fame and recognition.

== Career ==
In 2008, Maeva Méline was selected for the role of Nannerl, sister of Mozart in the NRJ Award winning musical Mozart, l'opéra rock.

In 2010, she provided the vocals for the song "How to Believe" in the French version of Tinker Bell and the Great Fairy Rescue (Clochette et l'Expédition féerique). Also, Méline was the voice actress and singer for Rapunzel in the French version of the Disney animated movie Tangled (Raiponce).

In 2011, Méline released her singles: À Genoux and La Lumière. She returned to her role as a voice actress of Rapunzel for the French version of the Tangled sequel Tangled Ever After (Le Mariage de Raiponce). Maeva also performed the vocals of princess Merida for the French version of the Disney/Pixar animated film Brave (Rebelle).

In 2013, she participated in the second season of The Voice, la plus belle voix with the song "Skinny Love" by Bon Iver.

She is Jane's voice double in the movie Tarzan. She participated in the show Mozart, l'opéra rock, on tour from September 2014 in France, Switzerland and Belgium accompanied by a symphony orchestra from kyiv. Originally scheduled for spring 2014, it was postponed following the events in Ukraine.

In 2015, she created the musical project Looking for Suzanne. It is the association of the singer and her guitar. The first clip is a cover of Les parfums de sa vie by Art Mengo.

== Discography ==
=== Singles ===
Year	Title	Album
2009	Les solos sous les draps	Mozart, l'opéra rock
2009	Le Bien qui fait mal	Mozart, l'opéra rock
2009	Dors mon ange	Mozart, l'opéra rock
2009	Penser l'impossible	Mozart, l'opéra rock
2009	Debout les fous	Mozart, l'opéra rock
2010	C'est bientôt la Fin	Mozart, l'opéra rock
2011	À genoux	—
2011	La Lumière	—
2012	La dernière couche	—

== Filmography ==
- 2009: Clochette et l'Expédition féerique (Tinker Bell and the Great Fairy Rescue): Soloist for the song Comment y croire
- 2010: Raiponce (Tangled): as princess Rapunzel (adult voice and soundtrack)
- 2011: Voice role for the French version of TV animated series Trust Me, I'm a Genie (Diego et Ziggy)
- 2011: La Colline aux coquelicots (From Up on Poppy Hill): Yûko
- 2012: Le Mariage de Raiponce (Tangled Ever After): princess Rapunzel
- 2012: Rebelle (Brave): princess Merida (singing voice, soundtrack)
