= Yoann Fréget =

French singer

Yoann FreeJay
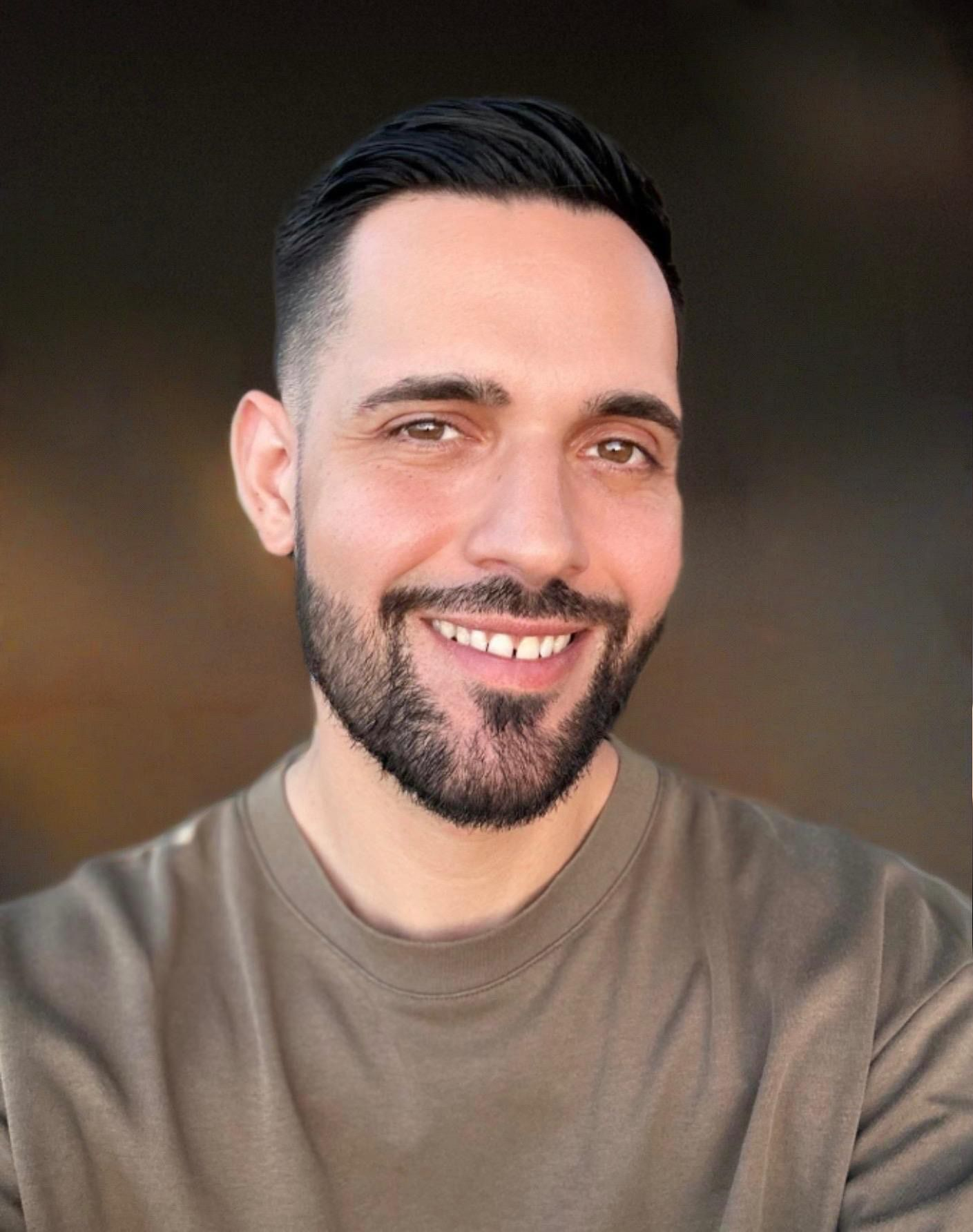

Background information
- Also known as: Yoann FreeJay
- Born: Yoann Fréget; 11 March 1987 (age 39); France
- Origin: French, Greek, Hungarian
- Genres: Soul music, Gospel, R'n'B, Funk, World music
- Occupations: Singer, Writer, Composer, Music Therapist
- Years active: 2002–present
- Website: www.yoannfreejay.com

Yoann FreeJay (born as Yoann Fréget) is a French singer, and the winner of the French edition of the TV show: The Voice (The Voice: la plus belle voix), as part of Team Garou.

Fréget auditioned for the show singing Whitney Houston's "The Greatest Love of All" with all four judges (Florent Pagny, Jenifer, Louis Bertignac and Garou) turning their chairs, along with a standing ovation from television studio's public. FreeJay (then 'Fréget') opted to be on Garou's team. His audition was aired on the third episode on 16 February 2013.

On 18 May 2013, Fréget won the final of the competition, against Olympe (Team Jenifer), Nuno Resende (Team Florent Pagny), and Loïs Silvin (Team Louis Bertignac).

Fréget is also the winner of the largest French Soul music competition, 'Sankofa Soul Contest', which he won on 24 June 2011, at Le Cabaret Sauvage (Paris).

Since May 2016, Fréget is living between New York City and Paris, as he obtained the US Visa of 'Artist with Extraordinary Abilities' for 3 years.

Fréget is currently preparing his second album, writing and composing all its songs, entirely in English.

== Early career ==
Fréget's musical career started as early as the age of 15, soon after he discovered Gospel music through a concert of the well-known choir 'Gospelize It! Mass Choir', directed by Emmanuel Pi Djob; one of the most famous Gospel music pioneer in France, originally from Cameroon. This concert was a deeply transformative musical and spiritual experience for Yoann.

Only a few months after, Fréget succeeded the audition to integrate the professional ensemble of nearly 100 singers, and quickly became not only one of the very few soloists of the choir, but also the younger one, giving a stirring rendition of "Amazing Grace" at every concert and touring France with the group for more than 3 years.

By the age of 18, Fréget began touring as lead singer for various popular gospel, soul, and rhythm & blues bands around France, such as BRBB (Otis Redding Tribute Band), The Soul Travelers Gospel Quartet, Gospel Shakers and Gospel Jam. He also created his own band at the time, along with a tribute for Stevie Wonder.

Later on, Fréget appeared as soloist in the European gospel choir, 'Gospel Pour 100 Voix' ('The 100 Voices of Gospel'). He collaborated with American gospel singers, including Malik Young, Linda Lee Hopkins, Francine Ealey Murphy, and Tori Robinson. While associated with 'Gospel Pour 100 Voix', he performed at the Zéniths, Paris-Bercy Arena, and Brussel's Cirque Royal in Belgium.

In 2008 and at the age of 21, Fréget graduated as a Music Therapist from the University of Montpellier. While there, he worked extensively with autistic children, as well as teenagers with stuttered speech syndrome (SSS). In the latter case, Fréget was teaching from experience, as he himself has been affected by severe stuttering disorder from the age of 3 to 19 years old. He totally overcame SSS through the practice of music and meditation.

That same year, Fréget also started to conduct his own gospel choir, 'Le Choeur Enchanté' and to give singing workshops all over Europe (England, Germany, Italy, Belgium, Sweden, Austria, etc ... ).

== Career ==
In 2010, Fréget made a journey of five months to India, in order to deepen his knowledge of music therapy and Indian classical music. He came back renewed and musically transformed by this experience of the Indian culture.

A few months after, Fréget was invited for his first solo tour in Canada, and USA. During 3 months, he performed more than 50 concerts in various cities and toured US from New York to Los Angeles. He inaugurated a personal performance style which featured concerts entirely a cappella, emphasizing on the unique beauty and moving expressiveness of his voice. This enabled him to present his music to a whole new audience and captivate new listeners, and to sing, for the first time of his career, as guest in the black community churches, where his performances were overwhelmingly well-received, and where he truly felt home. After this first US tour, Fréget's desire to live in America was born.

The Sankofa Soul Contest

When he returned to France in 2011, Fréget won first place in France's largest Soul music competition 'The Sankofa Soul Contest', while singing two songs by one of his musical heroes, Stevie Wonder. Fréget's contest prize was to travel back to the US to perform, with Erykah Badu's musicians backing him up. This concert was tailored for him in Dallas, Texas. Fréget also used that tour experience to travel to New Orleans, where he was invited by his friend and New Orleans native, Craig Adams, an American Gospel organist and singer. Adams invited Fréget to sing as a guest in many churches in New Orleans, accompanied by him on keys. These new experiences gave Fréget immersions into the African American culture and music.

Fréget has also had the honor to perform as a background singer for outstanding artists such as Stevie Wonder, Liz McComb, Nicole Slack Jones, Helen Carter, and Marianne Aya Omac.

The Voice' TV show

In 2013, Fréget won the TV show 'The Voice' in France. With an incredible rendition of 'The Greatest Love of All', receiving a standing ovation from the studio audience at the middle of the song, Fréget was selected by all four judges to be part of their respective teams. The judges were astonished to discover such a singer in France.

With more than 7 million viewers each week - and 10 million during the final show - during 5 months of airing, Fréget won over the hearts of millions of people. During his journey on 'The Voice', he covered some of the greatest standards of vocal music, from Pop ('Earth Song'/ Michael Jackson; 'Vole'/ Celine Dion; 'Calling You'/ Jevetta Steele) to Soul ('Man's World'/ James Brown; 'Can You Feel It?'/Jackson 5; 'Free'/ Stevie Wonder) to Gospel music ('Amazing Grace' / in duet with his coach Garou).

Soundtrack of Beauty & The Beast

On 6 January 2014, his first album with Universal Music France, 'Quelques Heures Avec Moi', was released. The record blends French pop and American soul, with lyrics contributed by François Welgryn (Celine Dion, Garou) and Jacques Veneruso (Celine Dion, Johnny Hallyday, Tina Arena). One of the songs on the album, 'Sauras-tu m'aimer?' was selected as the soundtrack for the French film Beauty and The Beast, directed by Christophe Gans, starring Vincent Cassel and Lea Seydoux. The film was a major box office success in France and several other markets.

On this same year, Fréget was invited by the international pop singer Lara Fabian (30 million records sold worldwide) to record a duet ('On Se Retrouvera') on the album 'Les Enfants du Top 50', which met great reception of the French public when performed live on French TV channel M6.

Fréget was also invited to perform for the opening act of WILL.I.AM's concert in Paris-Bercy Arena.

After his victory of The Voice, Fréget sang and appeared on numerous TV shows (Vivement Dimanche, La Parenthèse Innatendue, etc.), newspapers and radios.

He has been performing ever since for sold-out shows under his own name in France and abroad (Mauritius, Canada, Belgium, Switzerland, Nigeria, etc ... ), as he has been invited as well to sing with renowned French artists as Nicoletta, or Vladimir Cosma, and for numerous humanitarian galas and fundraising charity events (Eva Longoria's Global Gift Gala, Restos du Coeur Belgique, Les Femmes Dynamisantes de Clarins, Tout le Monde Chante Contre le Cancer, Les Petits Princes, Arthritis, Leurs Voix pour l'Espoir, etc.).

Second album in progress between France & USA

In May 2016, Fréget obtained the US Visa of 'Artist with Extraordinary Abilities,[67] and lived one year in New York City.

He has been performing in US in front of crowds of thousands for prestigious venues: renowned churches services (Donnie McClurkin's PFC, Hezekiah Walker LFC, and Harlem Kelly's Temple, Pleasant Grove.), Gospel music conventions (LAS VEGAS Thomas A. Dorsey's 2017 GMC, James Cleveland's 2017 GMWA), and global events as the Annual Holliday Tree Lighting at Manhattan's Washington Square Park, or the NYC Couture Fashion Week at the renowned Crowne Plaza Times Square Manhattan.

On 2 December 2016, Fréget gave his first NYC's sold-out solo concert at The Ashford & Simpson's Sugar Bar. He did so under the attention of the legendary Valerie Simpson (composer of "Ain't No Mountain High Enough", "I'm Every Woman", "You're All I Need To Get Bye") along with the mentorship of his godmother, the acclaimed film director Euzhan Palcy (A Dry White Season, Ruby Bridges).

== Personal life ==
Fréget has been a dedicated vocalist since his early childhood. His father, Eric Fréget, singer, keyboardist, writer & composer, was his first inspiration, while his mother, Emmanuelle Fréget, photographer, used to do backing vocals on his father's songs.

== Discography ==
=== Albums ===
Year	Album	Peak positions		Certification	Track listing
Year	Album	FR	BEL (Wa)	Certification	Track listing
2013	Quelques heures avec moi	21	69		1. "Quelques heures avec moi" (4:35); 2. "Sur tes épaules" (3:32); 3. "Bienvenue dans ma maison" (3:55); 4. "Un dieu très ordinaire" (3:54); 5. "L'equilibre" (3:21); 6. "Les mots qu'on ne peut pas dire" (3:26); 7. "Nos États-Unis" (3:28); 8. "Ça vient de là-haut" (3:31); 9. "Terre, mère" (3:14); 10. "Je donne" (3:55); 11. "Un cœur de femme" (3:35); 12. "Couleurs Love" (3:21); 13. "C'est tout comme" (3:22); 14. "Vole" (2:48); 15. "Sauras-tu m'aimer" (4:36); 16. "How Can You Love Me" (4:38); Plus: Digital booklet for album

=== Singles ===
Year	Single	Peak positions	Album
Year	Single	FR	Album
2013	"Calling You"	116	
2013	"Free"	138	
2013	"Ça vient de là-haut"	167	
2014	"Sauras-tu m'aimer"	120	Quelques heures avec moi
2014	"On se retrouvera" (with Lara Fabian)	197	

=== Soundtrack ===
- 2014: "Sauras-tu m'aimer" – from "Beauty & The Beast" - biggest movie budget of 2014 in France - directed by Christophe Gans; starring Vincent Cassel as the Beast & Léa Seydoux as Beauty.

Preceded by Stéphan Rizon	The Voice: la plus belle voix Winner; 2013	Succeeded by Kendji Girac
