= Lorie discography =

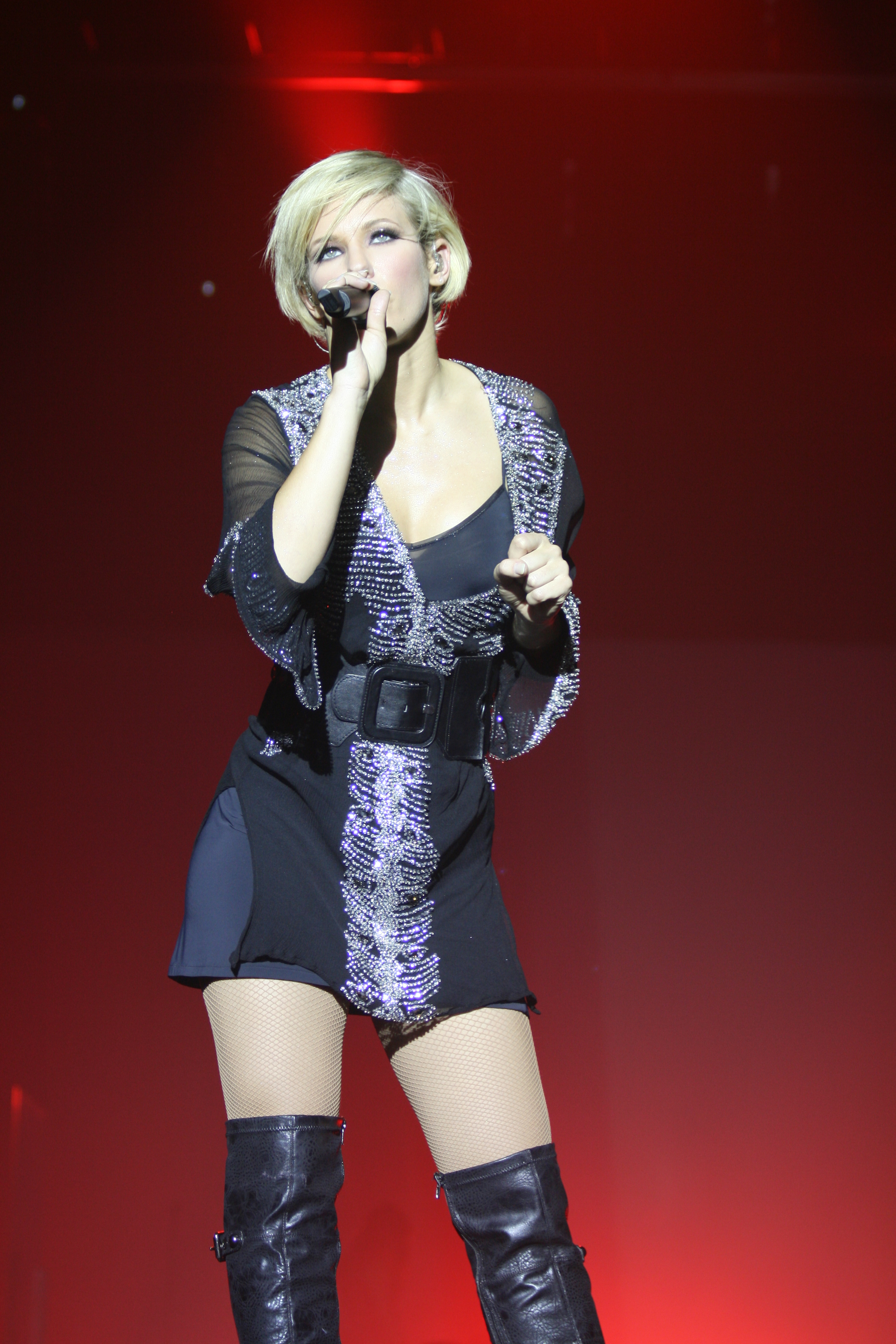
- Studio albums: 8
- Extended plays: 2
- Live albums: 3
- Compilation albums: 1
- Singles: 32
- Music videos: 19
- DVDs: 7
- Tours: 4

The discography of Lorie, a French pop singer, consists of five studio albums, one compilation album, three live albums and eighteen singles. Throughout her singing career, Lorie has obtained success in France, Canada and Francophone Belgium.

Her debut album, Près de Toi, was released on 30 September 2001. It sold about 1.2 million copies and peaked at number two in France. Certified triple platinum, it remains the singer's most successful album and provided the top ten singles "Près de moi", "Je serai (ta meilleure amie)" and "Toute seule".

On 16 September 2002, Lorie released her second album, Tendrement, which entered the French chart at number one. It was led the top ten hit "J'ai besoin d'amour", and spawned Lorie's first number-one single "Sur un air latino", which reached platinum status. The album sold over 1 million units and was certified platinum in France, becoming the singer's second successful studio album. It was followed by Lorie's first concerts tour and the release of her first live album, Live Tour 2003, which was number three in France.

== Albums ==
=== Studio albums ===
Year	Album details	Sales (France)	Certifications (sales thresholds)	Peak position			
Year	Album details	Sales (France)	Certifications (sales thresholds)	FR	FR (DD)	BE (WA)	SWI
2001	Près de toi: 1st studio album; Released: 30 September 2001; Translated title: Next to You; Format: CD	1,200,000	BE: Gold; CA: Platinum; FR: 3× Platinum; SWI: Gold	2	—	8	18
2002	Tendrement: 2nd studio album; Released: 16 September 2002; Translated title: Tenderly; Format: CD	1,013,000	BE: Gold; CA: Gold; FR: Platinum; SWI: Gold	1	—	11	13
2004	Attitudes: 3rd studio album; Released: 19 January 2004; Translated title: Attitudes; Format: CD	600,000	BE: Gold; FR: Platinum; SWI: Gold	1	—	1	5
2005	Rester la même: 4th studio album; Released: 31 October 2005; Translated title: Staying the Same; Format: CD	470,000	FR: Platinum	1	—	7	36
2007	2lor en moi ?: 5th studio album; Released: 26 November 2007; Translated title: Gold Inside Me; Format: CD	140,000	FR: Gold	7	22	23	56
2011	Regarde-moi: 6th studio album; Released: 21 November 2011; Translated title: Look at me; Format: CD	11,500		54	—	33	—
2012	Danse: 7th studio album; Released: 8 October 2012; Translated title: Dance; Format: CD	18,000		46	—	—	—
2017	Les choses de la vie: 8th studio album; Released: 17 November 2017; Translated title: The Things of Life; Format: CD	10,000		57	—	160	—
2024	Hyper Lorie: 9th studio album; Released: 24 juin 2024; Translated title: Hyper Lorie; Format: Download			—	—	—	—

=== Live albums ===
Year	Album details	Sales (France)	Certifications (sales thresholds)	Peak position			
Year	Album details	Sales (France)	Certifications (sales thresholds)	FR	FR (DD)	BE (WA)	SWI
2003	Live Tour 2003: 1st live album; Released: 25 August 2003; Translated title: Live Tour; Format: CD	250,000+	FR: 2× Gold	3	—	11	39
2004	Week-end Tour 2004: 2nd live album; Released: 4 October 2004; Translated title: Week-End Tour; Format: CD	200,000+	FR: Gold	2	—	5	69
2006	Live Tour 2006: 3rd live album; Released: 2006; Translated title: 2006 Live Tour; Format: CD	45,000+	—	27	—	19	—
"—" denotes releases that did not chart or was not released.

=== Compilation albums ===
Year	Album details	Sales (France)	Certifications (sales thresholds)	Peak position			
Year	Album details	Sales (France)	Certifications (sales thresholds)	FR	FR (DD)	BE (WA)	SWI
2005	Best Of: 1st compilation album; Released: 4 April 2005; Format: CD	100,000+	FR: Gold	2	—	4	77
"—" denotes releases that did not chart or was not released.

=== Singles ===
Year	Title	Sales (France)	Certifications (sales thresholds)	Peak position				Album
Year	Title	Sales (France)	Certifications (sales thresholds)	FR	FR (DD)	BE (WA)	SWI	Album
1999	"Baby boum"	—	—	—	—	—	—	—
2001	"Près de moi"	631,588	Platinum	2	—	1	—	Près de toi
2001	"Je serai (ta meilleure amie)"	308,271	Gold	5	—	5	25	Près de toi
2002	"Toute seule"	180,480	Silver	8	—	12	44	Près de toi
2002	"J'ai besoin d'amour"	207,715	Gold	7	—	15	24	Tendrement
2002	"À 20 ans"	118,923	Silver	15	—	20	38	Tendrement
2003	"Sur un air latino"	544,813	Platinum	1	—	1	8	Tendrement
2003	"Week-end"	266,567	Gold	2	—	6	8	Attitudes
2004	"La Positive Attitude"	99,676	—	9	—	8	31	Attitudes
2004	"Ensorcelée"	122,923	Silver	13	—	21	28	Attitudes
2004	"C'est plus fort que moi"	80,497	—	15	—	18	41	Attitudes
2005	"Toi et Moi"	115,645	Silver	7	—	9	29	Best Of
2005	"Rester la même"	64,506	—	15	—	28	88	Rester la même
2006	"S.O.S"	50,526	—	13	—	24	84	Rester la même
2006	"Parti pour zouker"	92,603	Silver	5	—	12	67	Rester la même
2006	"Fashion Victim"	32,836	—	20	—	33	—	Rester la même
2007	"Je vais vite"	80,046	—	3	13	7	—	2lor en moi ?
2008	"Play"	10,670	—	12	—	—	—	2lor en moi ?
2008	"1 Garçon"	20,000	—	23	—	—	—	2lor en moi ?
2011	"Dita"	1,500	—	—	—	—	—	Regarde Moi
2012	"Le Coup de Soleil"		—	—	—	—	—	Danse
2012	"Les Divas du Dancing"		—	—	—	—	—	Danse
2015	"Gates of the Sun"	—	—	—	—	—	—	Gates of the Sun OST
2017	"La vie est belle"		—	—	—	—	—	Les choses de la vie
2017	"Bel été"		—	—	—	—	—	Les choses de la vie
2018	"Tu dessines un sourire (remix)"	—	—	—	—	—	—	Les choses de la vie
2023	"Sur un air latino" (featuring Brö)	—	—	—	—	—	—	Hyper Lorie
2023	"Play"(featuring Bilal Hassani)	—	—	—	—	—	—	Hyper Lorie
2024	"Je serai (ta meilleure amie)" (featuring Piche)	—	—	—	—	—	—	Hyper Lorie
2024	"J'ai besoin d'amour" (featuring Adé)	—	—	—	—	—	—	Hyper Lorie
2024	"20 x 2"	—	—	—	—	—	—	N/A
2024	"I Want You Right Now"	—	—	—	—	—	—	N/A
"—" denotes releases that did not chart or was not released.
