= 2lor en moi? =

2lor en moi ?

Studio album by Lorie
- Released: 26 November 2007 (France, Belgium, Switzerland); 19 August 2008 (Canada)
- Genres: Pop, dance-pop, electropop
- Length: 43:43
- Labels: Sony BMG, Columbia, Vogue
- Producers: Frédéric "Asdorve" Château; Ian Masterson; Terry Ronald pigFACTORY; Peer Alstrom

Lorie chronology
Live Tour 2006 (2006)	2lor en moi ? (2007)

Singles from 2lor en moi ?
- 1. "Je vais vite" Released: 23 September 2007; 2. "Play" Released: 7 April 2008; 3. "1 garçon" Released: 5 December 2008

2lor en moi ? is French pop singer Lorie's fifth studio album, and her ninth album overall. It was physically released on 26 November 2007 and digitally on 27 September 2007.

== History ==
While most of her previous records consisted of pop/rock and bubblegum pop songs, Lorie thought it was the moment her music should become "more mature" since her fans "were all growing up". With the help of popular producers, a fresh new album was born, very different from anything Lorie had ever done before. On 23 September 2007 "Je vais vite" was released as the album's lead single to great response and chart success. The album came out three days later; it debuted at #7 in France, less than any other of her albums. Lorie's minor success with "2lor en moi?" has been always linked to the ascending popularity of Yelle, a then-new rising French songstress, to become a competition Lorie has to face; Yelle was presenting a more tecktonik-like sound that was driving teens, not to mention her unique and funky style. Six months after the French release, the album was available on Canadian downloads under the new label, Wolfgang Entertainment International, created by the singer Garou, who was Lorie's boyfriend at the time. The album was released on 19 August 2008 and the first single in Canada became "Play". "Play" was released in France on 7 April 2008 but its chart performance and success didn't match those of "Je Vais Vite" but "Play" became popular on its own all across Europe, especially in clubs. On 5 December 2008 the album's third single, "1 Garçon", was released to great response. The promotion was little but the song's lyrics ("parce que t'aime un garçon", which means "because you love a boy") and the video caused much controversy (for some of its scenes like the one when two guys get very close to each other and are about to kiss). In Lebanon, where singles "Je vais vite" and "Play" became #1s on Radio Party, the album sold quite fair and the next single "1 Garçon" is expected to premiere in January 2009. The song "Où tu n'oses pas" was only available on the digitally version of the album. There were two different versions of the album, the basic version and the collector version, including a DVD with a "making-of" over the creation of the album.

== Promotion ==
Lorie helped promote both the album and its lead single, "Je vais vite", by performing on shows like Star Academy and Hit Machine. She was also interviewed by multifarious magazines. Three singles have been released until now : "Je vais vite" (23 September 2007), "Play" (7 April 2008) and "1 Garçon" (5 December 2008).

== Critical reception ==
2lor en moi? has been very well received by pop critics.

== Track listings ==
Standard Edition
No.	Title	Writer(s)	Length
1.	"2lor en moi"	Asdorve, Axenn Raeyan	3:51
2.	"Je vais vite"	Asdorve	3:31
3.	"Play"	Asdorve	3:30
4.	"On ne grandit vraiment jamais"	Asdorve	3:46
5.	"L'accalmie"	Fabrice Ballot-Lena, Thomas Gustafsson, Hugo Lira, Ian-Paolo Lira, Negin	3:49
6.	"Avance encore"	2l'air, Simon Caby, Lorie, Laura Marciano, Serge Mounier, Thierry Sforza, Lætitia Vanhove	3:02
7.	"Le bonheur à tout prix !"	Paul Harris, Ian Masterson, Hannah Robinson, Sforza, Richard X	3:33
8.	"1 garçon"	2l'air, Christophe Emion, Lorie, Christine Roy	3:29
9.	"Pas un ange"	Tom Barnes, Gavin Jones, Peter Kelleher, Ben Kohn, Terry Ronald, Sforza	3:22
10.	"L'amour autrement"	Asdorve	3:35
11.	"La reine"	2l'air, Asdorve, Fred Château, Lorie	3:38
12.	"Loin des yeux"	2l'air, Emion, Lorie, Marciano, Roy, Sforza	4:37

Download Edition
No.	Title	Length
1.	"2lor en moi"	3:51
2.	"Je vais vite"	3:31
3.	"Play"	3:30
4.	"On ne grandit vraiment jamais"	3:46
5.	"L'accalmie"	3:49
6.	"Avance encore"	3:02
7.	"Le bonheur à tout prix !"	3:33
8.	"1 garçon"	3:29
9.	"Pas un ange"	3:22
10.	"L'amour autrement"	3:35
11.	"La reine"	3:38
12.	"Loin des yeux"	4:37
13.	"Où tu n'oses pas" (Bonus track)	3:41

- Collector's Edition The collector's edition contains a DVD with 12 episodes consisting on the preparation and the making of the album:

- L'auto-portrait
- Le challenge
- Le coaching vocal
- Le studio
- Le coaching sportif
- L'image
- La séance photo
- La chorégraphie
- Le clip
- Les fans
- Le bilan
- Le bêtisier

== Charts ==
Country	Peak position
Belgian (Wallonia) Albums Chart	23
European Top 100 Albums	54
French Albums Chart	7
Swiss Albums Chart	60

== Certification ==
Region	Certification	Certified units/sales
France (SNEP)	Gold	75,000^{*}
^{*} Sales figures based on certification alone.
