= Nima Nourizadeh =

British filmmaker (born 1977)

- Born: 12 November 1977 (age 48); London, England
- Education: Central Saint Martins
- Occupations: Film director, music video director, commercial director
- Years active: 2003–present
- Known for: Project X
- Father: Alireza Nourizadeh
- Relatives: Omid 16B (brother)

Nima Nourizadeh (Persian: نیما نوری‌زاده; born on 12 November 1977) is a British film, music video, and commercials director.

== Early life ==
Nourizadeh is the son of Iranian journalist Alireza Nourizadeh. He has two brothers, one of whom is the musician Omid 16B.

Nourizadeh graduated with a Bachelor of Arts in Fine Art Film from Central Saint Martins.

== Career ==
Nourizadeh has directed music videos for Dizzee Rascal, Pink Grease, Franz Ferdinand, Bat for Lashes, Santigold, Hot Chip, Yelle and Lily Allen. In 2008, he won Best Director at the UK Music Video Awards. He directed commercials for Adidas.

His debut film, Project X, released in March 2012, was nominated for 3 MTV Movie awards. His second film was the 2015 action comedy American Ultra, starring Jesse Eisenberg, Kristen Stewart, Connie Britton, John Leguizamo and Topher Grace.

Nourizadeh directed two episodes of the second series of Gangs of London, a British action-crime drama television series for AMC.

== Filmography ==
Film

- Project X (2012)
- American Ultra (2015)

Television

Year	Title	Notes
2010	Star Wars: Adidas Originals - Cantina 2010	Television Commercial
2020	Little America	Episode: "The Rock"
2022	The Wilds	2 Episodes
2022	Gangs of London	2 Episodes
2023	Warrior	Episode: "Exactly the Wrong Time to Get Proud"
2024	The Gentlemen	2 Episodes
2025	The Copenhagen Test	2 Episodes

Music videos

Year	Title	Artist	Notes	Ref.
2003	"Rhythm Bandits"	Junior Senior	With Simon Owens (The Imaginary Tennis Club)	
2003	"Jus' a Rascal"	Dizzee Rascal	With Simon Owens (The Imaginary Tennis Club)	
2004	"The pink G.R.Ease"	Pink Grease	With Simon Owens (The Imaginary Tennis Club)	
2004	"Birth, School, Work, Death"	Manhead	With Simon Owens (The Imaginary Tennis Club)	
2004	"Playboy"	Hot Chip	With Simon Owens (The Imaginary Tennis Club)	
2004	"Radio"	Ludes		
2005	"Love Is A Number"	White Rose Movement	version 1	
2005	"The Drill"	The Drill		
2005	"Good Weekend"	Art Brut		
2005	"Do the Whirlwind"	Architecture in Helsinki	version 2 (UK)	
2005	"Hoodie"	Lady Sovereign		
2006	"Over and Over"	Hot Chip		
2006	"Salvador"	Jamie T	Both versions	
2006	"My Patch"	Jim Noir		
2006	"Sheila"	Jamie T		
2006	"Colours"	Hot Chip		
2006	"LDN"	Lily Allen		
2006	"Carlights"	Pink Grease		
2006	"Littlest Things"	Lily Allen		
2007	"Calm Down Dearest"	Jamie T		
2007	"Our Velocity"	Maxïmo Park		
2007	"Me and My Imagination"	Sophie Ellis-Bextor		
2007	"Oh My God"	Mark Ronson ft. Lily Allen	Kaiser Chiefs cover	
2007	"A cause des garçons"	Yelle	À Caus' des Garçons cover	
2007	"Bonafied Lovin"	Chromeo		
2008	"Ready for the Floor"	Hot Chip		
2008	"L.E.S. Artistes"	Santigold		
2008	"Ladies of the World"	Flight of the Conchords		
2008	"Rat Is Dead (Rage)"	CSS		
2009	"Pearl's Dream"	Bat for Lashes		
2009	"No You Girls"	Franz Ferdinand		
