= Tendrement =

Studio album by Lorie
- Released: 16 September 2002
- Genre: Pop, dance-pop, teen pop
- Length: 42:49
- Label: EGP
- Producer: Johnny Williams

Lorie chronology
Près de Toi (2001)	Tendrement (2002)	Live Tour (2003)

Singles from Tendrement
- 1. "J'ai besoin d'amour" Released: 1 October 2002; 2. "À 20 ans" Released: 13 January 2003; 3. "Sur un air latino" Released: 19 May 2003

Tendrement is the second album by French pop singer Lorie. It originally came out on 16 September 2002 in a regular jewel case version and a limited edition cardboard box containing the CD in a digipak and eight postcards featuring the famous blond singer. On 2 December 2002, a limited Christmas edition of the album was released, in digipak form, with extra tracks and a DVD... but no more postcards. Finally, on 2 June 2003, the regular jewel case was re-released to include the hit single "Sur un air latino". As of 20 September 2004, this version can be bought jointly with the singer's debut album, Près de Toi.

== Track listing ==
=== Original version ===
1. "Intro" — 0'30
2. "J'ai besoin d'amour" — 3'38
3. "Fan'2 toi" — 4'38
4. "Pour que tu me reviennes" — 4'01
5. "Tendrement" — 3'54
6. "Ton sourire" — 3'41
7. "Dans mes rêves" — 3'57
8. "Dis-moi" — 3'43
9. "À 20 ans" — 3'20
10. "Je t'aime maman" — 3'58
11. "Laisse faire le fun" (featuring 4 You) — 4'02

=== Christmas limited edition ===
==== CD ====
1. "Intro" — 0'30
2. "J'ai besoin d'amour" — 3'38
3. "Fan'2 toi" — 4'38
4. "Pour que tu me reviennes" — 4'01
5. "Tendrement" — 3'54
6. "Ton sourire" — 3'41
7. "Dans mes rêves" — 3'57
8. "Dis-moi" — 3'43
9. "À 20 ans" — 3'20
10. "Je t'aime maman" — 3'58
11. "Laisse faire le fun" (featuring 4 You) — 4'02
12. "When I Think About You" — 3'48
13. "J'ai besoin d'amour (version acoustique)" — 3'08

==== DVD ====
1. "Près de moi" — 3'43 (music video and karaoke video)
2. "Je serai (ta meilleure amie)" — 3'28 (music video and karaoke video)
3. "Toute seule" — 3'28 (music video and karaoke video)
4. "J'ai besoin d'amour" — 3'40 (music video and karaoke video)

=== New regular version ===
1. "Intro" — 0'30
2. "Sur un air latino" — 3'31
3. "J'ai besoin d'amour" — 3'38
4. "Fan'2 toi" — 4'38
5. "Pour que tu me reviennes" — 4'01
6. "Tendrement" — 3'54
7. "Ton sourire" — 3'41
8. "Dans mes rêves" — 3'57
9. "Dis-moi" — 3'43
10. "À 20 ans" — 3'20
11. "Je t'aime maman" — 3'58
12. "Laisse faire le fun" (featuring 4 You) — 4'02

== Charts ==
=== Weekly charts ===
Weekly chart performance for Tendrement
Chart (2002)	Peak position
Belgian Albums (Ultratop Wallonia)	11
French Albums (SNEP)	1
Swiss Albums (Schweizer Hitparade)	13

=== Year-end charts ===
Year-end chart performance for Tendrement
Chart (2002)	Position
Belgian Albums (Ultratop Wallonia)	61
Canadian Albums (Nielsen SoundScan)	142
French Albums (SNEP)	12
Swiss Albums (Schweizer Hitparade)	93
Chart (2003)	Position
Belgian Albums (Ultratop Wallonia)	50
French Albums (SNEP)	37

== Certifications ==
Region	Certification	Certified units/sales
Belgium (BRMA)	Gold	15,000^{*}
Canada (Music Canada)	Gold	50,000^{^}
France (SNEP)	Platinum	300,000^{*}
Switzerland (IFPI Switzerland)	Gold	20,000^{^}
^{*} Sales figures based on certification alone.^{^} Shipments figures based on certification alone.
