= À cause des garçons =

À cause des garçons may refer to:

- À cause des Garçons (band), a French duo formed by Hélène Bérard and Laurence Heller
- À cause des Garçons (album), the album by the eponymous band
- "À cause des garçons" (song) a song by the eponymous band and by Yelle
