= Week End Tour =

Live album by Lorie
- Released: 4 October 2004
- Genre: Pop, dance-pop, teen pop
- Length: 79:31
- Label: EGP
- Producer: Johnny Williams

Lorie chronology
Attitudes (2004)	Week End Tour (2004)	Best Of (2005)

Week End Tour was the name given to French pop singer Lorie's second concert tour, inspired by her hit single "Week End". On 4 October 2004, a live recording of the show was released in two versions, as with the famous singer's previous live effort, Live Tour: a regular jewel case release containing the CD and a DVD and a limited edition cardboard box also containing a poster and a watch featuring the blonde songstress during her performances. On 12 June 2004, a filmed version of the show was released on DVD, once again in two versions. The limited edition DVD additionally contained a bonus disc with additional special features, as well has a new, double-sided poster and a removable tattoo of the singer's name.

== Live album track listing ==
=== CD ===
1. "Intro Week End Tour" — 1'24
2. "Sur la scène" — 4'53
3. "La positive attitude" — 5'05
4. "Toute seule" — 3'54
5. "J'ai besoin d'amour" — 5'28
6. "C'est plus fort que moi" — 4'54
7. "En regardant la mer" — 4'01
8. "Medley Week End Tour" — 7'41
  - "Près de moi" — 1'09
  - "Je serai (ta meilleure amie)" — 1'39
  - "Dans mes rêves" — 0'43
  - "I Love You" — 0'47
  - "Tout pour toi" — 2'45
1. "Baggy, bandana et poésie" — 4'34
2. "Ensorcellée" — 4'38
3. "Si tu revenais" — 5'17
4. "Ma bonne étoile" — 5'18
5. "Les ventres ronds" — 8'12
6. "Week End" — 5'39
7. "Sur un air latino" — 6'07
8. "Au delà des frontières" — 7'50

=== DVD ===
1. "Ensorcellée" (Music video)
2. "Ensorcellée" (Making of)
3. "C'est plus fort que moi (live)" (Music video)
4. "Week End Live Tour" (Making of)

== Certifications ==
Country	Certification	Date	Sales certified
France	Gold	2004	100,000

== Charts ==
Chart (2004)	Peak position
Belgian (Wallonia) Albums Chart	5
French Albums Chart	2
Swiss Albums Chart	69

End of the year chart (2004)	Position
Belgian (Wallonia) Albums Chart	44
French Albums Chart	65
