= Live Tour (Lorie album) =

Live album by Lorie
- Released: 25 August 2003
- Genre: Pop, dance-pop, teen pop
- Length: 79:32
- Label: EGP
- Producer: Johnny Williams

Lorie chronology
| Tendrement (2002) | Live Tour (2003) | Attitudes (2004) |

Live Tour was the name given to French pop singer Lorie's first concert tour. On 25 August 2003 a live recording of the show was released in two versions: a regular, jewel case release containing the CD and a DVD, and a limited edition cardboard box also including an exclusive all-access pass from the concert, five photos from the show in 20x29 cm format and a message written by the popular female singer. The CD booklet in both versions is a fold out poster. On 20 October 2003 a filmed version of the show was released on DVD.

== Live album track listing ==
=== CD ===
1. "Intro Show Lorie" — 2'21
2. "Près de moi" — 4'17
3. "Toute seule" — 3'35
4. "Pour que tu me reviennes" — 4'08
5. "I Love You" — 5'00
6. "Ne me dis rien" — 4'17
7. "Entre vous deux" — 3'48
8. "L'homme de ma vie" — 3'57
9. "Dans mes rêves" — 4'33
10. "Je t'aime Maman" — 4'03
11. "Laisse faire le fun" (duo 4 You) — 4'21
12. "Fan'2 toi" — 4'30
13. "Je serai (ta meilleure amie)" — 5'20
14. "Tendrement" — 4'34
15. "Tout pour toi" — 4'13
16. "Ton sourire" — 4'08
17. "À 20 ans" — 3'23
18. "J'ai besoin d'amour" — 4'28
19. "Se donner la main" — 4'27

=== DVD ===
1. "Sur un air latino" (Making of) — 27'00
2. "Sur un air latino" (Karaoke) — 3'31
3. "Sur un air latino" (Music video) — 3'31
4. "À 20 ans" (Making of) — 10'00
5. "Exclusive excerpts from the tour" — 5'00

== Charts ==
| Chart (2003) | Peak position |
|---|---|
| Belgian (Wallonia) Albums Chart | 11 |
| French Albums Chart | 3 |
| Swiss Albums Chart | 39 |

| End of the year chart (2003) | Position |
|---|---|
| French Albums Chart | 59 |

== Certifications ==
| Region | Certification | Certified units/sales |
|---|---|---|
| France (SNEP) | 2× Gold | 200,000^{*} |
| France (SNEP) DVD | 3× Platinum | 60,000^{*} |
^{*} Sales figures based on certification alone.
