= Alireza Nourizadeh =

Iranian journalist (born 1949)

- علیرضا نوری‌زاده
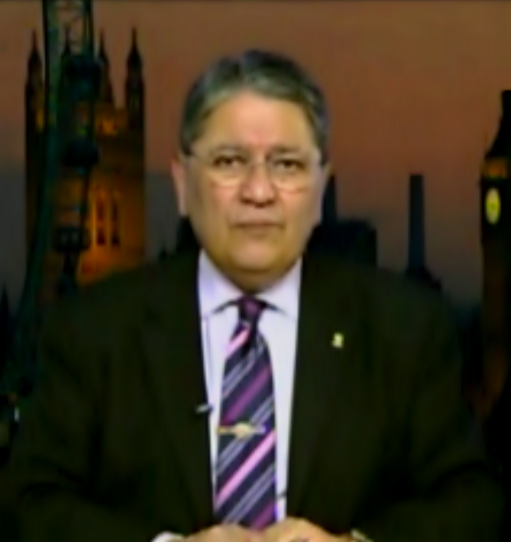
- Nourizadeh on Voice of America, 2011
- Born: June 24, 1949 (age 77); Tehran, Pahlavi Iran
- Education: University of London
- Children: 3; including Nima and Omid

Alireza Nourizadeh or Ali Reza Nourizadeh (Persian: علیرضا نوری‌زاده, born 24 June 1949 in Tehran) is an Iranian scholar, literary figure, journalist, political activist and an expert on Iranian contemporary history.

== Career ==
Nourizadeh is a political refugee from Iran. After fleeing to the United Kingdom, he obtained his Ph.D. from the University of London in International Relations. He is a monarchist.

Nourizadeh himself has been active in the Iranian journalistic milieu since 1967. Before Iranian Revolution, he was editor of Ettela'at, a strongly pro-Shah Iranian newspaper.

Nourizadeh called the 2011 suicide of Ali-Reza Pahlavi, the youngest son of the Shah, "a tragedy for the Iranian people".

He is a senior researcher and director at the Centre for Arab & Iranian Studies strongly opposed to the Islamic Republic of Iran.

Nourizadeh is also a correspondent for Deutsche Welle, a Political Commentator for the radio channel Voice of America, a senior writer for the London-based Saudi-owned newspaper Al-Sharq Al-Awsat.

In June 2013, three days after Hassan Rouhani was elected as President of Iran, Israeli news website Ynetnews reported Nourizadeh's claim that Rouhani's son "committed suicide in protest at his father's close connection with Supreme Leader Ali Khamenei".

== Assassination attempt ==
Nourizadeh was targeted by Iranian national Mohammad Reza Sadeghinia in 2009 while visiting London, according to a cable from the Embassy of the United States, London.

Sadeghinia attempted to hire a hitman to assassinate Iranian-American broadcaster Jamshid Sharmahd, and as a result, he was detained in California on suspicion of soliciting murder. The FBI alerted UK authorities to the threat since his conduct toward Nourizadeh was consistent with his interactions with Sharmahd, and Nourizadeh was subsequently warned. The threat materialized as a result of Nourizadeh's anxiety, which led him to inform the US embassy about his interactions with Sadeghinia.

== Personal life ==
Nourizadeh is the father of director Nima Nourizadeh, director of the 2012 film Project X and the 2015 film American Ultra, and electronic music producer Omid 16B.

== Works and publications ==
- 1970 - Dar Parvandehaye Ghatlhaye Zanjirei (Farsi Edition)
- Nourizadeh, Alireza (1996). Ba Khoon-e Del Neveshtam. p. 482.
- 2001 - Sona-ye Zafaraniyeh (Farsi Edition)
- Nourizadeh, Alireza (2002). Fallahian, Mardi Baraye Hame-ye Janayat. p. 189.
- Nourizadeh, Alireza (2012). Folks of Amirieh: Bacheh-haye Amirieh. p. 150. ISBN 978-1-780-83065-0. (Persian Edition)

== See also ==
- Chain murders of Iran
