= L'Ère du Verseau =

Studio album by Yelle
- Released: 4 September 2020
- Studios: Montreal, Canada
- Genre: Electropop
- Length: 33:10
- Label: Recreation Center
- Producer: Jean-François Perrier

Yelle chronology
Complètement fou Remix (2015)	L'Ère du Verseau (2020)

Singles from L'Ère du Verseau
- 1. "Je t'aime encore" Released: 28 April 2020; 2. "Karaté" Released: 21 July 2020; 3. "Noir" Released: 7 April 2021

Professional ratings
Review scores
Source	Rating
AllMusic	4.5/5 stars
Exclaim!	8/10
Tom Hull – on the Web	B+

L'Ère du Verseau (French for 'The Age of Aquarius') is the fourth studio album by French dance-pop band Yelle. It was released on 4 September 2020 by Recreation Center, the record label founded by the band. It is the band's first album since the release of Complètement fou six years prior.

== Background ==
Yelle began writing L'Ère du Verseau in the spring of 2019. The band was in Montreal to record a song with Billboard, a music producer who previously collaborated with the band on Complètement fou. The album was completed just before the COVID-19 pandemic placed France in lockdown.

== Track listing ==
L'Ère du Verseau
No.	Title	Writer(s)	Producer(s)	Length
1.	"Émancipense"	Jean-François Perrier; Julie Budet; Tanguy Destable; Thibaud Vanhooland	Perrier	2:53
2.	"J'veux un chien"	Perrier; Budet; Christophe Le Flohic; Destable	Perrier	3:15
3.	"Je t'aime encore"	Perrier; Budet; Vaughn Oliver	Perrier	3:35
4.	"Karaté"	Perrier; Budet; Victor Thieffry-Watel	Perrier	2:58
5.	"Menu du jour"	Perrier; Budet; Vanhooland	Perrier	2:58
6.	"Mon beau chagrin"	Perrier; Budet; Tony Hymas	Perrier; Oliver	2:14
7.	"Vue d'en face"	Perrier; Budet; Vanhooland; Destable	Perrier	3:22
8.	"Noir"	Perrier; Budet; Iason Chronis; Destable	Perrier	3:12
9.	"Peine de mort"	Perrier; Budet; Mathieu Jomphe-Lépine	Perrier	4:35
10.	"Un million"	Perrier; Budet; Destable	Perrier	4:21
Total length:				33:00

Bonus: Bops EP
No.	Title	Writer(s)	Producer(s)	Length
11.	"Ici & Maintenant (Here & Now)"	Perrier; Budet; Destable; Adrien Gallo	Perrier	3:50
12.	"Interpassion"	Perrier; Budet; Victor Le Masne	Perrier	3:08
13.	"Romeo"	Perrier; Budet	Perrier	3:30
14.	"OMG!!!"	Perrier; Budet; Antoine Boulé	Perrier	3:10
Total length:				13:24

== Charts ==
Chart performance for L'Ère du Verseau
Chart (2020)	Peak position
Belgian Albums (Ultratop Wallonia)	138
French Albums (SNEP)	74
