= Pop Up (album) =

Studio album by Yelle
- Released: 3 September 2007
- Recorded: La Méaugon, Saint-Julien and Rennes, France
- Genre: Electropop
- Length: 48:35
- Language: French
- Label: Source Etc
- Producer: GrandMarnier

Yelle chronology
Pop Up (2007)	Safari Disco Club (2011)

Professional ratings
Review scores
Source	Rating
AllMusic	4/5 stars

Pop Up is the debut studio album by French electropop band Yelle. It was released on 3 September 2007 by the EMI-owned label Source Etc. The album peaked at number 61 in France, where it was certified silver by the Syndicat National de l'Édition Phonographique (SNEP). As of June 2008, the album had sold 45,000 copies in France and 11,000 copies in the United States.

== Promotion ==
On 26 February 2008, Yelle performed the track "A cause des garçons" on the BBC Three talk show Lily Allen and Friends. They were featured as MTV's Artist of the Week for the week of 24–30 March 2008, appearing during adverts. The group also appeared twice on NBC's Last Call with Carson Daly, performing "A cause des garçons" on 12 November 2008 and "Ce jeu" on 4 February 2009.

The Riot in Belgium remix of Yelle's single "A cause des garçons" was featured on the soundtrack of the 2007 Electronic Arts video game Need for Speed: ProStreet. EA Sports also included the remix in UEFA Euro 2008, the official video game of the UEFA Euro 2008 tournament.

"A cause des garçons" was used as the opening song for the Moschino spring/summer 2008 runway show. In 2008, it was also featured in an advert being broadcast in Quebec for Telus. Their single "Je veux te voir" was featured on the season four finale of HBO's Entourage on 2 September 2007, in the opening scene when the gang arrives in Cannes. "A cause des garçons" was also used in one of the Les Jeunes de Paris sketches on the 12 November 2011 episode of Saturday Night Live, hosted by Emma Stone.

== Track listing ==
No.	Title	Writer(s)	Length
1.	"Ce jeu"	Julie Budet; Jean-François Perrier; Tanguy Destable	3:41
2.	"A cause des garçons"	Pierre Grillet; Alain Chamfort	3:48
3.	"Dans ta vraie vie"	Perrier; Budet; Destable	3:47
4.	"Tristesse/Joie"	Perrier; Budet	5:49
5.	"Mal poli"	Perrier; Budet	2:54
6.	"Les Femmes"	Perrier; Budet; Destable	4:15
7.	"Tu es beau"	Perrier; Budet; Destable	5:47
8.	"Je veux te voir"	Perrier; Budet	4:21
9.	"Amour du sol"	Perrier; Budet; Destable	4:22
10.	"Mon meilleur ami"	Perrier; Budet; Destable	3:57
11.	"85A"	Perrier; Budet; Destable	2:28
12.	"Jogging"	Perrier; Budet	3:26

US edition bonus track
No.	Title	Writer(s)	Length
13.	"A cause des garçons" (Tepr Remix)	Grillet; Chamfort	2:52

Japanese edition bonus tracks
No.	Title	Writer(s)	Length
13.	"A cause des garçons" (Tepr Remix)	Grillet; Chamfort	2:52
14.	"Tristesse/Joie" (Rolf Honey Remix)	Perrier; Budet	4:40

iTunes Store deluxe edition bonus tracks
No.	Title	Writer(s)	Length
13.	"Les Femmes" (Siriusmo Remix)	Perrier; Budet; Destable	4:09
14.	"A cause des garçons" (Drixxxé Remix)	Grillet; Chamfort	4:36
15.	"A cause des garçons" (Obsession Remix)	Grillet; Chamfort	5:43

Sample credits

- "Ce jeu" contains a sample from "Let Me Go" as performed by Heaven 17.
- "Tu es beau" contains a sample from "Do You Really Want an Answer?" as performed by Zapp.

== Personnel ==
Credits adapted from the liner notes of Pop Up.

- GrandMarnier – production, recording, mixing, design
- Olivier de Brood – recording, mixing
- Chris Gehringer – mastering
- Pierre Le Ny – art direction
- Grégoire Alexandre – photography
- Jr. Henry – design

== Charts ==
Chart (2007–08)	Peak position
French Albums (SNEP)	61
US Heatseekers Albums (Billboard)	14
US Top Dance Albums (Billboard)	8

== Certifications ==
Region	Certification	Certified units/sales
France (SNEP)	Silver	45,000

== Release history ==
Region	Date	Label	Ref.
France	3 September 2007	Source Etc	
United States	1 April 2008	Astralwerks; Caroline	
Japan	23 April 2008	EMI	
