= Complètement fou (Remix) =

EP / Remix album by Yelle
- Released: July 24, 2015
- Recorded: 2013–2014
- Genres: Electropop; synth-pop; French pop
- Length: 19:42
- Labels: Kemosabe; Because Music

Yelle chronology
Complètement fou (2014)	Complètement fou (Remix) (2015)	L'Ère du Verseau (2020)

Complètement fou (Remix) is an extended play (EP) by French electropop group Yelle, released through Kemosabe Records on July 24, 2015.

Complètement fou (Remix) contains five remixes of songs from Yelle's third studio album, Complètement fou, released in 2014; an Alexaert remix of "Moteur Action", Sophie and A. G. Cook remix of "Moteur Action", Kool Kojak remix of "Ba$$in", 20Syl remix of "Complètement fou" and a Tepr remix of "Complètement fou".

== Track listing ==
No.	Title	Writer(s)	Producer(s)	Length
1.	"Moteur action" (Alexaert remix)	Jean-François Perrier; Julie Budet; Jérôme Echenoz; Mathieu Jomphe	Perrier; Jomphe	4:20
2.	"Moteur action" (Sophie and A. G. Cook remix)	Perrier; Budet; Echenoz; Jomphe	Perrier; Jomphe; Sophie Long; Alex Cook	2:58
3.	"Ba$$in" (ThE KoOoL kOjAk A.D.D Ba$$iN MeGaMiX)	Perrier; Budet	Perrier; Alexander Castillo Vasquez; Ryan Nasci; Oliver Goldstein; Allan Grigg	3:35
4.	"Complètement fou" (20syl Remix)	Perrier; Budet; Henry Walter; Echenoz; Lukasz Gottwald	Perrier; Walter; Gottwald; Irene Richter; Sylvain Richard	2:48
5.	"Complètement fou" (TEPR REMIX)	Perrier; Budet; Walter; Echenoz; Gottwald	Perrier; Walter; Gottwald; Richter; Tanguy Destable	5:44
Total length:				19:42
