= Je veux te voir =

Single by Yelle

from the album Pop Up
- B-side: "Jogging"
- Released: 28 August 2006
- Recorded: 2006
- Genre: Electropop
- Length: 4:21
- Label: Source Etc
- Songwriter(s): Julie Budet, Jean-François Perrier
- Producer(s): DJ Grand Marnier

Yelle singles chronology
| "Je veux te voir" (2006) | "A cause des garçons" (2007) |

"Je veux te voir" is a song by French electropop group Yelle, released as the lead single from their debut album, Pop Up (2007). The song, originally posted on MySpace under the title "Short Dick Cuizi", was written as an answer to certain rap groups and in particular the rapper Cuizinier of the group TTC. It mocks his sexual prowess and equipment relentlessly, though Yelle has stated in interviews that it's "not a diss track, but a funny track with lots of references". The song, with its booty-pop, electro-punk sound (courtesy of DJ Grand Marnier, who wrote and produced the track), quickly rose to popularity, earning more than 2,500,000 listens on MySpace and 25,000,000 views on YouTube.

== Music video ==
The video features Yelle singing and dancing in front of a background of fluorescent hearts, rainbows, and geometric shapes. The words of the song scroll along the bottom of the screen similar to karaoke. The "Karaoke Deluxe" version features an Eastern garden with a man with the long hair (Gerard Vives). In 2008, another version of the video was released which depicts Yelle in the gym, riding in a Hummer, and dancing at a nightclub. Vincent Desagnat appears in this version. At the beginning of the clip one can hear the intro of Jogging, the last song on the international edition of Pop-Up, and the B-side of "Je veux te voir".

== Track listing ==
| # | Title | Duration |
|---|---|---|
Maxi Single
| 1. | "Je veux te voir" | 4:21 |
| 2. | "Je veux te voir" [Disco D Remix] | 3:55 |
| 3. | "Je veux te voir" [Club-Club Version] | 3:15 |
| 4. | "Jogging" | 3:27 |

=== Other remixes ===
1. "Je veux te voir" [DJ Anthox Remix]
2. "Je veux te voir" [TEPR Remix]

== Charts ==
| Chart (2008) | Peak position |
|---|---|
| Airplay World Official Top 100 | 49 |
| Europe Official Top 100 | 41 |
| France (SNEP) | 4 |
| Worldwide Singles Official Top 100 | 52 |
