= Parti pour zouker =

Single by Lorie featuring Dadoumike

from the album Rester la même
- Released: 26 May 2006
- Recorded: France
- Genre: Pop, Zouk
- Length: 3:19
- Label: Sony BMG, Vogue
- Songwriter(s): Johnny Williams
- Producer(s): Johnny Williams

Lorie singles chronology
"S.O.S." (2006)	"Parti pour zouker" (2006)	"Fashion Victim" (2008)

Music video
- "Parti pour zouker" on YouTube

"Parti pour zouker" is the name of a 2006 song recorded by the French artist Lorie. It was the third single from her fourth studio album, Rester la même, on which it is the eighth track. It was released on 26 May 2006 and features Dadoumike, a rapper who performs the background vocals. This song, which has zouk influences, was a summer hit in France, where it reached the top five, and also had success in Belgium (Wallonia).

== Chart information ==
The song was performed on Lorie's 2006 tour and was thus available on her live album Live tour 2006 (fourth track, CD 2). It was also included on the French compilations La Compil du lapinou, Hits 2 en 1 2006, vol. 3 and Crazy Kids 3.

The music video was shot on a beach of Deshaies, Guadeloupe, and was directed by Karim Ouaret.

In France, the single gave Lorie a new top five hit, which she had not had since "Week End" in 2003. It remained in the top ten for three weeks, in the top 50 for 16 weeks, and in the top 100 for 19 weeks. It was certified Silver and was the 45th best-selling single of the year.

In Belgium, the single appeared for 15 weeks on the Ultratop 40. It started at #32 on 10 June and gained a few places almost every week, until reaching #12 in its eighth week. Then it regularly dropped on the chart. It was eventually ranked at #63 on the Annual Chart.

== Track listings ==
CD single

1. "Parti pour zouker" (radio edit) — 3:19
2. "Parti pour zouker" (club mix) — 5:52
3. "Parti pour zouker" (instrumental) — 3:17

Digital download

1. "Parti pour zouker" (radio edit) — 3:19
2. "Parti pour zouker" (club mix) — 5:52
3. "Parti pour zouker" (instrumental) — 3:17
4. "Parti pour zouker" (video) — 3:48

== Charts and sales ==
=== Weekly charts ===
Chart (2006)	Peak position
Belgian (Wallonia) Singles Chart	12
French SNEP Singles Chart	5
Swiss Singles Chart	67

=== Year-end charts ===
Chart (2006)	Position
Belgian (Wallonia) Singles Chart	63
French Singles Chart	45

=== Certifications ===
Certifications for "Parti pour zouker"
Region	Certification	Certified units/sales
France (SNEP)	Silver	100,000^{*}
^{*} Sales figures based on certification alone.
