= Week End (Lorie song) =

Single by Lorie

from the album Attitudes
- B-side: Instrumental; "Con sabor latino" (cd maxi)
- Released: 15 December 2003
- Recorded: France
- Genre: Pop rock
- Length: 4:02
- Label: EGP
- Songwriters: Johnny Williams, Pierre Billon
- Producer: Johnny Williams

Lorie singles chronology
"Sur un air latino" (2003)	"Week End" (2003)	"La Positive Attitude" (2004)

Music video
- "Week End" on YouTube

"Week End" is a song recorded in 2003 by the French singer Lorie. It was released on 15 December 2003 as the first single from Lorie's third studio album, Attitudes, on which it features as second track. The song was a great success in the countries where it was released, becoming a top ten hit.

== Song information ==
The text was Pierre Billon and Johnny Williams, and the latter also composed the music. The music video, an Outsider Music, was directed by Vincent Egret and shot in Tignes, France. It shows the singer and some of her friends playing in the snow.

The song was performed during Lorie's tours Ween End Tour and Live Tour 2006. It was thus included on the live album Week End Tour (14th track) and on Live Tour 2006 (fifth track). It features also on Lorie's 2004 best of (eighth track).

== Chart performance ==
In France, "Week End" went straight to number two on 14 December 2003 and stayed there for three consecutive weeks, being unable to dislodge the Star Academy 3's "L'Orange" which topped the chart, then it dropped slowly on the chart, totaling ten weeks in the Top 10, 17 weeks in the Top 50 and 22 weeks in the Top 100. It was certified Gold disc by the Syndicat National de l'Édition Phonographique, and featured at number 64 (with only three weeks on the chart) and 32 on the Annual Charts of 2003 and 2004. As of July 2014, it was the 98th best-selling single of the 21st century in France, with 310,000 units sold.

"Week End" entered the Belgian (Wallonia) at number 12 on 27 December 2003, reached a peak of number 6 for four non-consecutive weeks and remained for seven weeks in the Top 10 and 18 weeks in the top 40. It was the 40th best-selling single of 2004 in this country. In Switzerland, the single was a Top 10 hit from its debut on the chart, starting at number eight on 4 January 2004, featured for 11 weeks in the Top 50, and 14 weeks in the Top 100. It was the 75th best-selling single of the year in the country.

== Track listings ==
CD single

1. "Week End" — 4:02
2. "Week End" (instrumental) — 4:02

CD maxi

1. "Week End" — 4:02
2. "Con sabor latino" — 3:41
3. "Week End" (instrumental) — 4:02

Digital download

1. "Week End" — 4:02
2. "Week End" (2004 live version) — 5:39
3. "Week End" (2006 live version) — 4:08

== Charts ==
=== Weekly charts ===
Weekly charts for "Week-end"
Chart (2003–2004)	Peak position
Belgium (Ultratop 50 Wallonia)	6
Europe (European Hot 100 Singles)	5
France (SNEP)	2
Switzerland (Schweizer Hitparade)	8

=== Year-end charts ===
Year-end charts for "Week-end"
Chart (2003)	Position
France (SNEP)	64

Chart (2004)	Position
Belgium (Ultratop 50 Wallonia)	40
France (SNEP)	32
Switzerland (Singles Chart)	75

== Certifications ==
Certifications for "Week End"
Region	Certification	Certified units/sales
France (SNEP)	Gold	250,000^{*}
^{*} Sales figures based on certification alone.
