= À 20 ans =

Single by Lorie

from the album Tendrement
- B-side: "Sans contrefaçon"
- Released: 13 January 2003
- Recorded: France
- Genre: Dance-pop
- Length: 3:20
- Label: EGP
- Songwriter(s): Johnny Williams, Pierre Billon
- Producer(s): Johnny Williams

Lorie singles chronology
"J'ai besoin d'amour" (2002)	"À 20 ans" (2003)	"Sur un air latino" (2003)

Music video
- "À 20 ans" on YouTube

"À 20 ans" is a 2002 song recorded by the French singer Lorie. It was released on 13 January 2003 as the second single from her second studio album, Tendrement, on which it is the ninth track. The song was the least successful from this album, reaching only the top 20 in Belgium (Wallonia) and France.

== Song information ==
The song, which had dance sonorities, was written by Johnny Williams and the music composed by Pierre Billon. As for the music video, it was shot at Studio français, directed by Vincent Egret and produced by Plein Sud Films. It shows Lorie in a futurist scenery.

The song was included on Lorie's 2005 best of, on which it features as tenth track. It was also performed during the singer's first tour and was thus included on the 2003 live album Live Tour, as 17th track. The studio version of the song was also available on French compilations, such as Non Stop Hits 5 and Girls 2003.

The second track on the CD single is a cover of Mylène Farmer's 1987 hit, "Sans contrefaçon".

== Chart performance ==
In France, the single entered on 18 January 2003 at a peak of number 15 and stayed there for another week. After that, it dropped rather quickly and totaled 12 weeks in the top 50 and 16 weeks in the top 100. It was certified Silver disc by SNEP, and was ranked 59th on the Annual Chart.

The single featured for 13 weeks on the Belgian Singles Chart for the Wallonia (Ultratop 40), from 8 February to 3 May 2003; it debuted at number 36 and peaked at number 20 in its third and seventh weeks. It was the 75th best-selling single of the year in the country.

The single started at number 100 on 26 January 2003 on the Swiss Singles Chart, then climbed to number 42 and peaked at number 38 two weeks later. It appeared for three weeks in the top 50 and 16 weeks in the top 100.

== Track listings ==
- CD single Limited Edition
1. "À 20 ans" (edit radio) — 3:20
2. "Sans contrefaçon" — 3:56
- CD single
1. "À 20 ans" (edit radio) — 3:20
2. "À 20 ans" (bodyguard radio edit) — 3:25
3. "À 20 ans" (instrumental) — 3:20
- Digital download
1. "À 20 ans" (edit radio) — 3:20
2. "À 20 ans" (2003 live version) — 3:23

== Charts ==
=== Weekly charts ===
Weekly chart performance for "À 20 ans"
Chart (2003)	Peak position
Belgium (Ultratop 50 Wallonia)	20
Europe (Eurochart Hot 100 Singles)	46
France (SNEP)	15
Switzerland (Schweizer Hitparade)	38

=== Year-end charts ===
Year-end chart performance for "À 20 ans"
Chart (2003)	Position
Belgium (Ultratop 50 Wallonia)	75
France (SNEP)	59

== Certifications ==
Certifications for "À 20 ans"
Region	Certification	Certified units/sales
France (SNEP)	Silver	125,000^{*}
^{*} Sales figures based on certification alone.
