= Safari Disco Club =

Studio album by Yelle
- Released: 14 March 2011
- Studio: Recreation Center (Brittany, France)
- Genre: Electropop; synth-pop
- Length: 42:24
- Language: French
- Label: Barclay
- Producer: Jean-François Perrier; Tanguy Destable; Moritz Friedrich

Yelle chronology
Pop Up (2007)	Safari Disco Club (2011)	Complètement fou (2014)

Singles from Safari Disco Club
- 1. "Safari Disco Club" Released: 10 January 2011; 2. "Que veux-tu" Released: 17 January 2011; 3. "Comme un enfant" Released: 30 November 2011

Professional ratings
Aggregate scores
Source	Rating
Metacritic	69/100
Review scores
Source	Rating
AllMusic	4/5 stars
ChartAttack	3.5/5
The Fly	3/5 stars
The Independent	Favourable
One Thirty BPM	70%
The Phoenix	2/4 stars
Slant Magazine	3.5/5 stars
Spin	7/10
UR Chicago	4/5

Safari Disco Club is the second studio album by French electropop band Yelle. It was released on 14 March 2011 by Barclay Records. The album was promoted by the singles "Safari Disco Club", "Que veux-tu" and "Comme un enfant".

Safari Disco Club received mixed-to-positive reviews from critics upon its release. While some reviewers praised the tracks' catchy melodies and dancefloor-friendly sound, others found it inferior to their debut album Pop-Up (2007). A few critics even went on to criticize the lead singer Julie Budet's vocal performances.

== Promotion ==
The first single, "Safari Disco Club", was released on 10 January 2011, with a music video directed by Jérémie Saindon following on 1 March 2011.

== Tour ==
Yelle supported Katy Perry on the UK leg of her California Dreams Tour, beginning on 17 March 2011. Yelle also toured Europe, North America, South American, Asia and Oceania in support of Safari Disco Club.

== Track listing ==
All lyrics are written by Jean-François Perrier and Julie Budet

No.	Title	Music	Producer(s)	Length
1.	"Safari Disco Club"	Perrier; Tanguy Destable	Perrier; Destable^{[a]}	3:34
2.	"Que veux-tu"	Perrier; Destable	Perrier; Destable	3:53
3.	"C'est pas une vie"	Perrier; Destable	Perrier; Destable^{[a]}	3:34
4.	"Comme un enfant"	Destable; Perrier	Destable; Perrier^{[a]}	4:13
5.	"Chimie physique"	Destable; Perrier	Destable; Perrier^{[a]}	3:54
6.	"La Musique"	Moritz Friedrich	Friedrich; Perrier^{[a]}	3:38
7.	"Mon pays"	Perrier; Destable	Perrier; Destable^{[a]}	4:32
8.	"J'ai bu"	Perrier; Destable	Perrier; Destable^{[a]}	3:07
9.	"Le Grand Saut"	Friedrich	Friedrich; Perrier^{[a]}	3:58
10.	"Unillusion"	Friedrich	Friedrich; Perrier^{[a]}; Destable^{[a]}	3:50
11.	"S'éteint le soleil"	Perrier; Destable	Perrier; Destable^{[a]}	4:11

Digital bonus tracks (except the US)
No.	Title	Music	Length
12.	"Que veux-tu" (Madeon Extended Remix)	Perrier; Destable	4:46
13.	"Chimie physique" (Fortune Remix)	Destable; Perrier	4:24
14.	"Mon pays" (Lo Fi Fnk Remix)	Perrier; Destable	3:07

US iTunes Store deluxe edition bonus tracks
No.	Title	Music	Length
12.	"Safari Disco Club" (BeatauCue Remix)	Perrier; Destable	5:14
13.	"Que veux-tu" (Madeon Extended Remix)	Perrier; Destable	4:46

Notes

- ^{^a} signifies an additional producer

== Personnel ==
Credits adapted from the liner notes of Safari Disco Club.

=== Yelle ===
- Julie Budet (a.k.a. Yelle) – vocals
- Jean-François Perrier (a.k.a. Grand Marnier) – keyboards, drums, guitar, programming
- Tanguy Destable (a.k.a. Tepr) – keyboards, drums, guitar, programming

=== Technical ===
- Jean-François Perrier – production (tracks 1–3, 7, 8, 11); additional production (tracks 4–6, 9, 10); recording, mixing (all tracks)
- Tanguy Destable – additional production (tracks 1, 3, 7, 8, 10, 11); production (tracks 2, 4, 5); recording (tracks 1–5, 7, 8, 11)
- Moritz Friedrich (a.k.a. Siriusmo) – production, recording (tracks 6, 9, 10)
- Olivier Le Brouder – recording (tracks 1–5, 7, 8, 11); mixing (all tracks)
- Mike Marsh – mastering

=== Artwork ===
- Grégoire Alexandre – photographies
- Leslie David – graphic design

== Charts ==
Chart (2011)	Peak position
Belgian Albums (Ultratop Wallonia)	76
French Albums (SNEP)	77
Spanish Albums (PROMUSICAE)	92
US Heatseekers Albums (Billboard)	13
US Top Dance/Electronic Albums (Billboard)	9
US World Albums (Billboard)	4

== Release history ==
Region	Date	Label	Ref.
France	14 March 2011	Barclay	
United Kingdom	28 March 2011	V2	
United States	29 March 2011	V2; Cooperative USA; Downtown	
Canada	5 April 2011	Cooperative; Fontana North	
