= Rester la même =

Studio album by Lorie
- Released: 28 October 2005
- Genre: Pop, dance-pop, zouk, pop rock, R&B
- Length: 73:00
- Label: Sony BMG, Vogue

Lorie chronology
Best of (2005)	Rester la même (2005)	Live Tour 2006 (2006)

Singles from Rester la même
- 1. "Rester la même" Released: 2 December 2005; 2. "S.O.S." Released: 24 February 2006; 3. "Parti pour zouker" Released: 26 May 2006; 4. "Fashion Victim" Released: 20 October 2006

Rester la même is French pop singer Lorie's fourth studio album, and her seventh album overall. It was released on 28 October 2005 and contains the hit single "Parti pour zouker". The album went to number one on the French Albums Chart and also achieved success in Belgium (Wallonia).

== Track listing ==
1. "Rester la même" — 3:46
2. "Mille et une nuits" — 5:02
3. "Un Amour XXL" — 3:11
4. "S.O.S." — 5:25
5. "Game Over" — 3:15
6. "Fashion Victim" — 4:25
7. "Ange et Démon" — 4:32
8. "Parti pour zouker" — 5:08
9. "Parle-lui" — 3:48
10. "Santiago de Cuba" — 4:00
11. "Pas comme les autres" — 4:31
12. "Peur de l'amour" — 4:35
13. "Je fonce" — 4:26
14. "On chante" — 4:24
15. "Quand tu danses" (remix edit) — 4:16
16. "Un Signe du destin" — 3:19
17. "Si demain..." — 5:28

== Certifications ==
Region	Certification	Certified units/sales
France (SNEP)	Platinum	300,000^{*}
^{*} Sales figures based on certification alone.

== Charts ==
Chart (2005)	Peak position
Belgian (Wallonia) Albums Chart	7
French Digital Chart	7
French Albums Chart	1
Swiss Albums Chart	36

End of year chart (2005)	Position
Belgian (Wallonia) Albums Chart	39
French Albums Chart	24
End of year chart (2006)	Position
French Albums Chart	163
