= Sur un air latino =

Single by Lorie

from the album Tendrement
- B-side: "Je t'aime maman" (CD single); Remix (CD maxi)
- Released: 19 May 2003
- Recorded: 2003, France
- Genre: Pop
- Length: 3:31
- Label: EGP
- Songwriters: Johnny Williams, Pierre Billon, Lorie
- Producer: Johnny Williams

Lorie singles chronology
"À 20 ans" (2002)	"Sur un air latino" (2003)	"Week End" (2003)

Music video
- "Sur un air latino" on YouTube

"Sur un air latino" is a 2003 single recorded by the French singer Lorie. Released on 19 May 2003, the song was the third single from her second album Tendrement. It achieved a great success, topping the French and Belgian Singles Charts.

== Song information ==
"Sur un air latino" was written and composed by Johnny Williams, Pierre Billon and Lorie herself. The music video was shot on the beach, in Cuba.

The song was not available on the first edition of the album Tendrement, but it features on the second edition, as second track. It is the second track on Lorie's best of. It was also performed during Lorie's second tour and was therefore included on the 2004 live album Week End Tour, as 15th track.

In 2023, the song was re-released as a new version featuring French singer Brö, titled "Sur un air latino (2023)", marking a comeback to music for Lorie.

== Chart performance ==
In France, "Sur un air latino" entered the SNEP chart at number 63 on 11 May 2003, jumped to number two and reached number one for two non consecutive weeks; then it dropped slowly on the chart, totaling 17 weeks in the top ten, 27 weeks in the top 50 and 31 weeks in the top 100. It was certified platinum by the Syndicat National de l'Édition Phonographique, and featured at number six on the 2003 year-end chart. As of August 2014, the song was the 17th best-selling single of the 21st century in France, with 570,000 units sold.

In the Walloon region of Belgium, the single debuted at number 12 on 31 March 2003, climbed up to number three and hit number one where it stayed for four non consecutive weeks. It remained for 16 weeks in the top ten and 23 weeks in the top 40. It reached platinum status, and was the sixth best-selling single of the year.

"Sur un air latino" charted for 33 weeks on the Swiss Singles Chart (top 100), 23 of them spent in the top 50. It entered at number 15 on 6 June, reached number eight in its ninth week and stayed in the top ten for seven weeks, becoming Lorie's more successful single in this country.

== Track listings ==
- CD single + Limited Edition
1. "Sur un air latino" — 3:31
2. "Je t'aime maman" — 3:58
3. "L'homme de ma vie" — 3:28

+ Bonus : four pages with song's lyrics

- CD single
1. "Sur un air latino" (radio édit) - 3:36
2. "Sur un air latino (instrumental) - 3:36
- CD maxi
1. "Sur un air latino" (havana club mix)
2. "Sur un air latino" (havana radio edit)
3. "Sur un air latino" (groovy latino club mix)
4. "Sur un air latino" (German club mix)
- Digital download
1. "Sur un air latino" — 3:31
2. "Sur un air latino" (2004 live version) — 6:07

== Charts ==
=== Weekly charts ===
Chart (2003)	Peak position
Belgium (Ultratop 50 Wallonia)	1
France (SNEP)	1
Switzerland (Schweizer Hitparade)	8

=== Year-end charts ===
Chart (2003)	Position
Belgium (Ultratop 50 Wallonia)	6
France (SNEP)	6
Switzerland (Schweizer Hitparade)	20

== Certifications ==
Country	Certification	Date	Sales certified
Belgium	Platinum	18 October 2003	40,000
France	Platinum	18 December 2003	500,000
