= American Ultra =

2015 film by Nima Nourizadeh

- Theatrical release poster
- Directed by: Nima Nourizadeh
- Written by: Max Landis
- Produced by: Anthony Bregman; Kevin Frakes; Raj Brinder Singh; David Alpert; Britton Rizzio
- Starring: Jesse Eisenberg; Kristen Stewart; Topher Grace; Connie Britton; Walton Goggins; John Leguizamo; Bill Pullman; Tony Hale
- Cinematography: Michael Bonvillain
- Edited by: Bill Pankow; Andrew Marcus
- Music by: Marcelo Zarvos
- Production companies: The Bridge Finance Company; Circle of Confusion; Likely Story; Merced Media Partners; PalmStar Media Capital; PalmStar Entertainment; Tadmor Entertainment
- Distributed by: Lionsgate
- Release date: August 21, 2015
- Running time: 96 minutes
- Country: United States
- Language: English
- Budget: $28 million
- Box office: $30.3 million

American Ultra is a 2015 American action comedy film directed by Nima Nourizadeh and written by Max Landis. The film stars Jesse Eisenberg, Kristen Stewart, Topher Grace, Connie Britton, Walton Goggins, John Leguizamo, Bill Pullman and Tony Hale. The story is about a stoner who discovers he was part of a secret government program and is a sleeper agent.

It was released on August 21, 2015, by Lionsgate. The film received mixed reviews from critics, with praise for the premise and cast, but criticism that it "fails to live up to its potential". The film underperformed at the box office, earning a worldwide total of $30.3 million against a production budget of $28 million.

== Plot ==
Mike Howell is a stoner who lives in the sleepy town of Liman, West Virginia, where he works as a convenience store clerk. He is planning to propose to his longtime girlfriend, Phoebe Larson, on a trip to Hawaii. He is unable to board the plane, as he suffers from intense panic attacks anytime he tries to leave town. He does not understand why Phoebe puts up with him.

In Langley, Virginia, CIA Agent Victoria Lasseter receives a coded warning that Mike, the sole survivor of her "Wiseman" Ultra program, is to be eliminated by her rival, Adrian Yates, and his similar "Toughguy" agents. Feeling a duty to protect Mike, Lasseter travels to Liman and "activates" Mike through a series of code words. Mike fails to understand their significance, and she leaves in resigned frustration.

Mike finds two Toughguys interfering with his car and is attacked, but his training activates and he kills them using a spoon. He calls Phoebe, who reaches him just as Sheriff Watts arrives. Yates sends two Toughguy operatives, Laugher and Crane, to kill Mike and Phoebe at the sheriff station, but they evade Laugher and kill Crane before escaping to the home of Mike's drug dealer Rose. Mike becomes unnerved by an array of facts he suddenly knows regarding military strategy. He also realizes he has very little memory prior to living in the town with Phoebe, wondering aloud why he never questioned this before.

Yates quarantines the town, and puts Lasseter and Mike's pictures on the local news as carriers of an infectious disease. Lasseter convinces her former assistant, Petey Douglas, to air drop her a weapon using a drone. Yates finds out and threatens to charge Petey with treason. Yates orders an attack on Rose's house with Toughguys using a lethal gas.

The agents kill Rose and his two guards, Big Harold and Quinzin, before Mike and Phoebe kill the attackers and she rescues Mike from the gas, which she is familiar with. When pressed for answers on her knowledge of the gas, Phoebe reluctantly reveals she was a CIA agent assigned to be Mike's handler, leaving him heartbroken.

Laugher ambushes the duo and captures Phoebe. Mike is rescued by Lasseter and insists on returning to his house. She tells him that he volunteered for Wiseman due to his criminal record and subsequently had his memories erased. He also learns that Phoebe was to get him settled in Liman and then leave, but chose to stay because she genuinely fell in love. Lasseter explains that his panic attacks, including his fear of leaving town, were implanted to keep him safe.

Yates' army liaison, Otis, joins a Toughguy to attack Mike's house. Mike and Lasseter put up resistance, prompting Yates to order a drone strike on the entire block. Petey calls off the drone strike at the last minute, then secretly reports the situation to Yates' superior, Raymond Krueger.

Mike contacts Yates and arranges to exchange himself for Phoebe at a local grocery store. He attacks the store, killing or incapacitating multiple Toughguys before fighting and defeating Laugher, whom he spares when Mike learns he is a mentally unbalanced man forcibly conscripted by Yates. Phoebe escapes from Yates when Lasseter attacks and attempts to kill him, but Krueger arrives and stops her.

Phoebe and Mike leave the store under gunpoint of multiple law enforcement officers. He proposes to her before they are both tasered.

In a forested area, Krueger has Yates and Lasseter bound and kneeling. Yates argues that what he was doing would have been okay with Krueger, despite the deaths of innocent people, if the results had been successful, and Krueger agrees. Yates smugly smiles and stands, but is executed by Krueger for his failure. Krueger admits he informed Lasseter of Yates' plan as a courtesy but did not expect her to intervene. He is about to execute her and also plans to terminate Mike. Lasseter points out that, by taking out seventeen Toughguys, Mike is proof of the success of the Wiseman program and a potentially valuable asset.

Six months later, Mike and Phoebe are in Manila, confident and happy as they carry out a CIA assignment together.

== Cast ==
- Jesse Eisenberg as Mike Howell
- Kristen Stewart as Phoebe Larson
- Topher Grace as Adrian Yates
- Connie Britton as Victoria Lasseter
- Walton Goggins as Laugher
- John Leguizamo as Rose
- Bill Pullman as Raymond Krueger
- Tony Hale as Petey Douglas
- Lavell Crawford as Big Harold
- Stuart Greer as Sheriff Watts
- Monique Ganderton as Crane

== Production ==
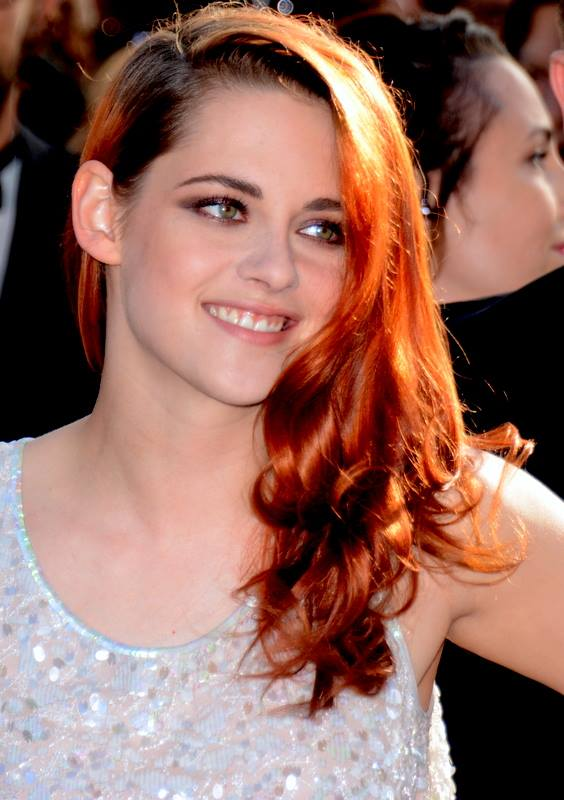
Kristen Stewart in 2014, with her hair dyed "orangey-red" for the role.

Writer Max Landis was inspired by a top secret CIA program from the 1950s code named "MKUltra," which conducted experiments on humans to develop superior agents through various mind control techniques. He wondered what it would be like if an ordinary stoner guy had been subjected to the program.

On November 4, 2013, it was announced that Eisenberg and Stewart were on board the project, having previously starred together in the film Adventureland. On March 14, it was announced Goggins had been cast in the film. On April 1, Grace joined the film. On April 14, Pullman and Hale joined the cast. On April 15, it was announced Sharon Stone had been cast in the film; it was later reported Britton would be replacing her.

=== Filming ===
Principal photography began on April 14, 2014, in Louisiana near New Orleans and wrapped in mid-June. Filming in Louisiana presented challenges: the production had to deal with snakes, alligators and torrential rain. Nourizadeh and director of photography Michael Bonvillain emphasized wide shots, and allowed the actors move around the set, with two cameras running to get coverage. The film was shot over a 43-day shooting schedule. The film received tax incentives for filming in Louisiana, and spent $20.4 million in the state and received $6.55 million in tax incentives. The film spent a further $3.3 million in post production in New York, and received $0.9 million in tax credits.

=== Animation ===
The "Apollo Ape" artwork was created by John Martel, a self-taught artist from Lake Charles, Louisiana. The promotional poster in the style of a comic book cover was done by artist Jim Evans. The end credits animation was made by Gary Leib. Leib worked on the animation over six months.

== Release ==
In November 2013, IM Global's Apsara Distribution announced that they had acquired the rights to distribute the film in multiple Asian territories. In March 2014, Lionsgate announced their acquisition of the North American rights to the film, for $7 million. In April 2015, Lionsgate set an August 21 release date for the film.

The first still and two teaser posters were released on May 14, 2015, by MTV. The red band trailer was released by Yahoo! Movies on May 28, 2015. To promote the film at Comic-Con, Lionsgate created a website offering free Marijuana to people with existing prescriptions.

The film premiered in Los Angeles, at the Theatre at Ace Hotel. The film was released on August 21, 2015. It is the first film to be released with a DTS:X soundtrack. According to iSpot.TV, Lionsgate spent $12.6 million on television advertising to promote the film.

== Reception ==
=== Box office ===
American Ultra grossed $14,439,985 in North America and $15,855,091 in other territories for a worldwide total of $30,295,076, against a budget of $28 million. Industry estimates predicted opening weekend earnings of $7 to $8 million. In its opening weekend, the film grossed $5.5 million, finishing sixth at the box office and third among the week's new releases, behind Sinister 2 ($10.5 million) and Hitman: Agent 47 ($8.3 million). Straight Outta Compton in its second week retained the #1 position. Landis reacted to the film's poor box office performance in a series of Twitter messages:

"So here's an interesting question: American Ultra finished dead last at the box office, behind even Mission Impossible and Man From Uncle. American Ultra was also beaten by the critically reviled Hitman Agent 47 and Sinister, despite being a better reviewed film than either, which leads me to a bit of a conundrum: Why? American Ultra had good ads, big stars, a fun idea, and honestly, it's a good movie. Certainly better, in the internet's opinion, than other things released the same day. If you saw it, you probably didn't hate it. so I'm left with an odd thing here, which is that American Ultra lost to a sequel, a sequel reboot, a biopic, a sequel and a reboot. It seems the reviews didn't even matter, the MOVIE didn't matter. The argument that can/will be made is: big level original ideas don't $ [sic]. Am I wrong? Is trying to make original movies in a big way just not a valid career path anymore for anyone but Tarantino and Nolan? That's the question: Am I wrong? Are original ideas over? I wanted to pose this to the public, because I feel, put lightly, confused."

In an interview with RedLetterMedia, Landis elaborated on his comments, and further discussed the difficulties of making a film not based on existing intellectual property and what he considered a misleading marketing campaign.

=== Critical response ===
American Ultra received mixed reviews from critics. On Rotten Tomatoes, the film has a rating of 44%, based on 174 reviews, with an average rating of 5.40/10. The site's critical consensus reads: "American Ultra has some interesting ideas, but like its stoned protagonist, it's too easily distracted to live up to its true potential." On Metacritic, the film has a score of 50 out of 100, based on 31 critics, indicating "mixed or average" reviews. Audiences surveyed by CinemaScore gave the film an average grade of "B−" on an A+ to F scale.

Mark Kermode of The Guardian gave the film two out of five stars, stating: "Jesse Eisenberg and Kristen Stewart brave and anarchic mish-mash with lots of violence but few laughs." David Dishman of the McAlester News-Capital wrote: "American Ultra promoted itself under the slogan, "There is nothing more dangerous than a stoned cold killer," and while they may be right, there's also nothing spectacular about that stoned cold killer's movie."

Peter Travers of Rolling Stone awarded the film two of four stars: "Soon the movie's twisty charm gives way to gory splatter. Eisenberg and Stewart stay appealing to the last. The movie, not so much." Neil Genzlinger from The New York Times gave the film a mixed review, ending with: "A lot of it seems familiar, and Mr. Eisenberg and Ms. Stewart aren't stretched much. But Mike finds amusing ways to defend himself using ordinary household items, Walton Goggins and John Leguizamo enliven things in goofy small roles, the plot has a nice twist or two, and your theater is probably air-conditioned." Todd McCarthy of The Hollywood Reporter had mixed opinions of the film, calling it uneven and "A genre mash that's mildly amusing until it can't think of anything else to do besides flop around in the deep end of conspicuous gore." He praises the supporting turns from Leguizamo, and Goggins. McCarthy gives particular praise to the animated end credits. Andrea Barker of Variety welcomed the film: "In a summer film slate awash with reboots, sequels and dutifully box-checking superhero product, it's refreshing to see a genre film made from a completely original screenplay" and praised the "clever ideas, bloody violence so cartoonish that it's almost cuddly, and an eminently likable leading pair" but was critical of the inconsistent tone and didn't feel the end result came together as a whole. Barker concludes, "Only at the end, with completely off-the-wall animated closing credits that embrace the film's latent surreality, do we finally get a glimpse of what American Ultra has been aching to become." Some critics said the marketing was misleading, and Neil Gunzlinger of The New York Times described it as "a diverting summer action adventure with occasional laughs, not a diverting stoner comedy with occasional action."

Author Stephen King praised the film, saying: "Saw AMERICAN ULTRA last night, and loved it. Fresh and exciting, very cool. Can't figure out why it isn't a smash."

== Cancelled Sequel ==
Landis had planned to write a sequel to the film, titled International Ultra. However, plans were scrapped following the film's poor box office performance.

== See also ==
- List of films featuring drones
- Drug-induced amnesia in popular culture
