= Près de moi =

2001 single by Lorie

Single by Lorie

from the album Près de Toi
- Released: 2000 (digital download); 24 April 2001 (physical single)
- Recorded: 2001, France
- Genre: Teen pop
- Length: 3:43
- Label: EGP
- Songwriters: Johnny Williams; Louis Element
- Producers: Johnny Williams; Louis Element

Lorie singles chronology
"Baby Boom" (2000)	"Près de moi" (2000)	"Je serai (ta meilleure amie)" (2001)

Music video
- "Près de moi" on YouTube

"Près de moi" is the second single recorded by the French singer Lorie. Released in 2001, it was the first single from her first album Près de Toi, on which it features as second track (and as 14th and 15th tracks in remixed versions). The single was a smash hit in France and Belgium (Wallonia).

== Background, writing, music video ==
Lyrics and music were composed by Johnny Williams and Louis Element in 2001. Lorie, who wanted to become a singer, went to the producers and was chosen to record the song. Initially, Près de moi was available as a free download on the Internet because no recording company wanted to release the song as a single. It was a success and Lorie signed a contract with Epic.

The music video was shot in Miami, directed by Vincent Egret and produced by Yul Films. In it, Lorie and some dancers perform a choreographied dance.

The song is included on Lorie's best of, and also on the live album Live Tour, as second track. It was included in a medley (eighth track) on the 2004 album Week End Tour. Many French compilations contain the song, such as Stars of TV, Dance Machine 22 and Hits France 2001.

== Chart performance ==
In France, "Près de moi" started at number 28 on 5 May 2001, hit number two on June 30, remained for 24 weeks in the top ten, 31 weeks in the top 50 and 32 weeks in the top 100. It was certified Platinum disc by the SNEP. As of August 2014, it was the 58th best-selling single of the 21st century in France, with 369,000 units sold. In Belgium (Wallonia), "Près de moi" charted for 30 weeks on the Ultratop 40, from 7 July 2001. It debuted at number 34, reached the top ten three weeks later, peaked at number one for three weeks and totaled 15 weeks in the top ten. On the pan-European Hot 100 Singles chart compiled by the Music & Media magazine, it charted for 31 weeks, with a peak at number 11 in its 23th week.

== Track listings ==
- CD single
1. "Près de moi" (radio edit) — 3:43
2. "Près de moi" (groove mix) — 3:25
- 12" maxi
1. "Près de moi" (groove club mixx) — 4:56
2. "Près de moi" (nice club mix) — 3:51
3. "Près de moi" (radio edit) — 3:51
- Versions available on the album
1. "Près de moi" (cutty remix) — 4:24
2. "Près de moi" (groovy club mix) — 4:55
3. "By My Side" — 3:42 (English version)

== Charts ==
=== Weekly charts ===
Weekly chart performance for "Près de moi"
Chart (2001)	Peak position
Belgium (Ultratop 50 Wallonia)	1
Europe (European Hot 100 Singles)	11
France (SNEP)	2

=== Year-end charts ===
Year-end chart performance for "Près de moi"
Chart (2001)	Position
Belgium (Ultratop 50 Wallonia)	14
Europe (Eurochart Hot 100 Singles)	44
France (SNEP)	9

== Certifications ==
Certifications for "Près de moi"
Region	Certification	Certified units/sales
France (SNEP)	Platinum	500,000^{*}
^{*} Sales figures based on certification alone.
