= A cause des garçons =

Song

"À caus' des garçons"

Single by À Caus' des Garçons
- Released: 1987
- Genre: Pop rock, new wave, synth-pop
- Length: 4:10
- Label: WEA
- Songwriters: Alain Chamfort, Pierre Grillet
- Producers: Alain Chamfort, Philippe Draï

À Caus' des Garçons singles chronology
"À caus' des garçons" (1987)	"Faire les voyous" (1988)

"À caus' des garçons" or "À cause des garçons" (French: "Because of the Boys") is a song first released by the Belgian duo À Caus' des Garçons comprising Laurence Heller and Hélène Bérard in 1987. It was covered by French trio Yelle on their 2007 debut album Pop Up, released as its second single.

== Charts ==
Chart (1988)	Peak position
Belgium (Ultratop Flanders)	30
France (SNEP)	13
Italy (Musica e dischi)	8
Italy Airplay (Music & Media)	2

== Yelle version ==
"A cause des garçons"

Single by Yelle

from the album Pop Up
- Released: 25 June 2007
- Recorded: 2007
- Genre: Electroclash; acid house
- Length: 3:54
- Label: Source Etc
- Songwriters: Alain Chamfort, Pierre Grillet
- Producer: GrandMarnier

Yelle singles chronology
"Je veux te voir" (2006)	"A cause des garçons" (2007)	"Parle à ma main" (2007)

The French trio Yelle covered "À cause des garçons" in 2007 for their debut album, Pop Up. It was released as the album's second single. The Riot in Belgium remix of the song is featured on the soundtrack to the Electronic Arts video games Need for Speed: ProStreet and Euro 2008.

In the song's music video, directed by Nima Nourizadeh, singer Julie Budet is seen singing and dancing in her room while getting ready for a few photoshoots for magazine covers. This all happens amid giant dancing objects played by dressed up men.

== Tecktonik version ==
A Tecktonik version of the song also exists, made by French producer Tepr. This electro version of the song was accompanied by a music video directed by Bastien Lattanzio and Guillaume Berg. The video featured Tecktonik dancers Treaxy and Vavan dancing on the street beside the letters of the word "Yelle".

== Track listings ==
French CD single and iTunes EP

1. "À cause des garçons" (Edit Version) – 3:10
2. "À cause des garçons" (Booster Remix) – 3:10
3. "À cause des garçons" (Album Version) – 3:54

French CD single – Tepr Remix

1. "À cause des garçons" (Tepr Remix) – 2:52
2. "À cause des garçons" (Album Version) – 3:54
3. "À cause des garçons" (Tepr Remix) (Video) – 2:52

French 12" single
A1. "À cause des garçons" (Original)
A2. "À cause des garçons" (Punks Jump Up Remix)
B1. "À cause des garçons" (Tepr Remix)
B2. "À cause des garçons" (Riot in Belgium Remix)

French iTunes remix EP

1. "À cause des garçons" (Punks Jump Up Remix) – 5:46
2. "À cause des garçons" (Tepr Remix) – 6:02
3. "À cause des garçons" (Riot in Belgium Remix) – 4:32

=== Charts ===
Chart (2007–2008)	Peak position
Belgium (Ultratip Flanders)	2
Belgium (Ultratip Wallonia)	23
Belgium (Ultratop 50 Dance Flanders)	4
Belgium (Ultratop 50 Dance Wallonia)	4
Belgium (Ultratop 50 Wallonia)	40
Europe (Eurochart Hot 100)	41
France (SNEP)	11
Switzerland (Swiss Singles Chart)	95

=== Release history ===
Country	Date	Label	Format	Catalog
France	25 June 2007	Source Etc.	CD single, digital EP	0094639722822
France	22 October 2007	Kitsuné	12" single, digital remix EP	KITSUNE063
France	17 December 2007	Source Etc.	CD single – Tepr Remix	5099951135706
