= À Caus' des Garçons =

Belgian musical duo

À Caus' des Garçons ('Because of the boys') is a Belgian duo formed by Laurence Heller and Hélène Bérard.

"A cause des garçons" was their main hit. It was written by Pierre Grillet and music by Alain Chamfort. Chamfort sings in the choir and appears in the music video produced by Gérard Pullicino and with Nagui, Smaïn, Jean-Pierre Kalfon, Pierre Grillet, Philippe Draï and Claire. The song was top 50 in France from February to May 1988. It peaked at number 13. In 2007, the song was covered by Yelle. Yelle's version was in turn covered by Robyn in 2009, under the title "Because of Boys".

== Discography ==
=== Singles ===
- 1987: "A cause des garçons"
- 1988: Faire les voyous
- 1989: Pas envie d'expliquer
