= Omid 16B =

British-Iranian musician (born 1974)

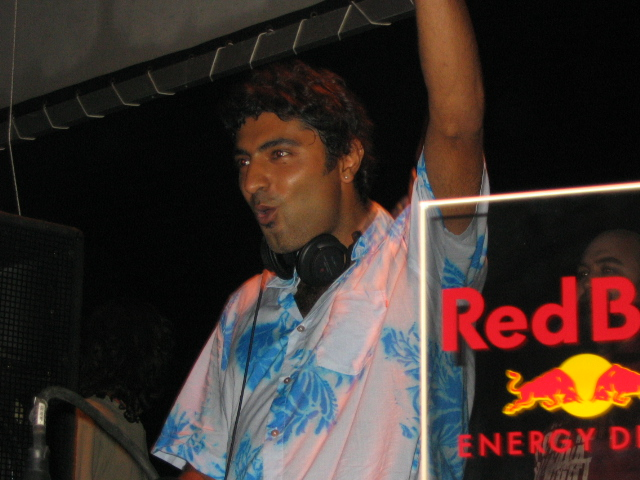

Background information
- Also known as: 16B, ORN, Phaser, $16 Million Dollar Man
- Born: Omid Nourizadeh; 1 January, 1974; Tehran, Iran
- Origin: London, England
- Genres: deep house, tech house, techno, nu disco
- Occupations: record producer, disc jockey, Record label owner
- Instruments: Turntables, Keyboard, Drums, Guitar
- Years active: 1993–present
- Labels: Alola, Disclosure, SexOnWax, Sony, EyeQ, Hooj Choons, Tsuba, Deconstruction, Tulipa, Stronghouse, Bedrock, Baroque, MOS, GU, BALANCE series
- Formerly of: SOS
- Website: www.omid16b.com

Omid Nourizadeh (Persian: امید نوری‌زاده), better known as Omid 16B or 16B, is a British-Iranian electronic music producer/composer and DJ based in London. He is considered one of the creators of the tech house genre.

== Biography ==
Omid's father, Alireza Nourizadeh, and his mother both originate from Iran but raised Omid in Putney, London. He grew up listening to rock music, and listed Jimi Hendrix, Neil Young and the Cure among his favourite artists – after Robert Smith became a fan Omid would later remix various Cure songs. He learnt to play guitar and formed a rock band, but after hearing hardcore records played on pirate music stations he began making his own tracks on basic equipment that he had bought. Beginning in 1995, his early house and techno singles were released on his own Alola and Disclosure labels under the names of 16B and Phaser, but they soon attracted the attention of big-name DJs such as Derrick Carter, François Kevorkian and Sasha, and he signed to Sven Väth's Eye Q label to release his debut album Sounds from Another Room in March 1998, which was described by the Independent on Sunday as "avant-garde" and by Muzik as "quite breathtaking".

Although he started out as a producer, Omid gradually moved into DJing, at the request of friends who asked him to play records at parties. He secured a regular spot playing the Elements club night run by Hooj Choons record label boss Red Jerry. In October 2001 Omid released The Witch/Which Equation under the alias of the Sixteen Million Dollar Man. Inspired by Prince initially releasing his Planet Earth album as a covermount with a British newspaper, Omid released his third studio album Like 3 Ears and 1 Eye (Part 1) in a similar manner as a covermount with the November 2007 issue of DJ Mag.

Omid also formed the SOS collective of DJs, consisting of him, Desyn Masiello and Demi. The trio secured a residency at London's Ministry of Sound nightclub, and were asked to produce the club's first mix CD in 2010.

== Discography ==
=== Studio albums ===
As 16B

- Sounds from Another Room (Eye Q, 1998)
- How to Live 100 Years (Hooj Choons, 2002)
- Silenciety (Alola Records, 2019 )
- SunTzu (Alola Records, 2020)

As $16 Million Dollar Man

- The Witch/Which Equation (Under the Counter, 2001)

As Omid 16B

- Like 3 Ears and 1 Eye (Part 1) (SexonWax, 2007)
- Like 3 Ears and 1 Eye (Part 2) (SexonWax, 2008)

=== Mix albums ===
- Everything All of Them Every Year (Alola, 2002)
- In House We Trust 4 (with Alex Neri) (Shinichi/Yoshitoshi, 2004)
- SexOnWax Traxx – (SexOnWax, 2004)
- DJ Face Off (with Mr. C) (DJ Mag, 2005)
- Sounds Like Alola Volume 1 (Alola, 2011)
- Omid 16B Presents Alola Volume 4 (Alola, 2013)

As SOS

- SOS The Collective – MOS presents SOS – (Ministry of Sound Club UK, 2010)
- SOS The Collective – Balance 013 – (Balance/EQ, 2008)
