= Attitudes (Lorie album) =

Studio album by Lorie
- Released: 19 January 2004
- Genre: Pop, dance-pop, pop rock
- Length: 51:44
- Label: EGP
- Producer: Johnny Williams

Lorie chronology
Live Tour (2003)	Attitudes (2004)	Week-end Tour (2004)

Singles from Attitudes
- 1. "Week End" Released: 15 December 2003; 2. "La Positive Attitude" Released: 5 April 2004; 3. "Ensorcellée" Released: 14 June 2004; 4. "C'est plus fort que moi" Released: 6 December 2004

Attitudes is Lorie's third studio album, and her fourth album overall. It has a self-admitted rockier sound than the singer's first two records and was released on 19 January 2004 in two versions: a regular, jewel case release and a limited edition digipak also containing a DVD and six stickers featuring the best-selling singing star. The album sold more than 350,000 in Europe alone.

== Track listing ==
=== CD ===
1. "Intro" – 0:55
2. "Week End" – 4:02
3. "Ensorcelée" – 3:57
4. "Sur la scène" – 4:17
5. "En regardant la mer" – 3:51
6. "Baggy, bandana et poésie" – 4:10
7. "La positive attitude" – 4:31
8. "C'est plus fort que moi" – 3:49
9. "Si tu revenais" – 4:21
10. "Ma bonne étoile" – 4:33
11. "Le temps de partir" – 3:25
12. "C'est fini" – 4:07
13. "Au delà des frontières" – 5:11

=== DVD (limited edition release only) ===
1. "Week End" (music video) – 4:02
2. "Week End" (karaoke) – 4:02
3. "Week End" (making of) – 26:00

== Charts ==
Chart (2004)	Peak position
Belgian (Wallonia) Albums Chart	1
French Albums Chart	1
Swiss Albums Chart	5

Year-end chart (2004)	Position
Belgian (Wallonia) Albums Chart	9
French Albums Chart	10

== Certifications ==
Region	Certification	Certified units/sales
Belgium (BRMA)	Gold	15,000^{*}
France (SNEP)	Platinum	300,000^{*}
Switzerland (IFPI Switzerland)	Gold	20,000^{^}
^{*} Sales figures based on certification alone.^{^} Shipments figures based on certification alone.
