= Complètement fou =

Studio album by Yelle
- Released: 29 September 2014
- Recorded: 2013–14
- Studio: Recreation Center Studio (France); Luke's In the Boo (Malibu); Pulse Recording (Los Angeles)
- Genre: Electropop; synth-pop; French pop
- Length: 41:58
- Language: French
- Label: Kemosabe; Because Music
- Producer: Various: GrandMarnier; Cirkut; Dr. Luke; Kool Kojak; Irene Richter; A.C; Ryan Nasci; Oligee; JMIKE; Mad Max; Vaughn Oliver; Billboard

Yelle chronology
Safari Disco Club (2011)	Complètement fou (2014)	Complètement fou (Remix) (2015)

Singles from Complètement fou
- 1. "Complètement fou" Released: 25 August 2014; 2. "Ba$$in" Released: 20 May 2015

Complètement fou ("Completely crazy" in French) is the third studio album by French electropop group Yelle. It was released on 29 September 2014 in France, and worldwide on 2 October 2014.

== Track listing ==
Complètement fou
No.	Title	Writer(s)	Producer(s)	Length
1.	"Complètement fou"	Jean-François Perrier; Julie Budet; Henry Walter; Jérôme Echenoz; Lukasz Gottwald	Perrier; Walter; Gottwald	3:50
2.	"Ba$$in"	Perrier; Budet	Perrier; Alexander Castillo Vasquez; Ryan Nasci; Oliver Goldstein	2:59
3.	"Coca sans bulles"	Perrier; Budet; Walter; Echenoz; Gottwald; Vasquez	Perrier; Vasquez; Walter; Gottwald	3:38
4.	"Les Soupirs et les Refrains"	Perrier; Budet; Echenoz; Ricky Witherspoon; Jeremy Coleman	Perrier; Vasquez; Witherspoon; Coleman	3:45
5.	"Nuit de baise I"	Perrier; Budet; Goldstein	Perrier; Vasquez; Goldstein	2:15
6.	"Toho"	Perrier; Budet; Echenoz; Vasquez; Vaughn Oliver	Perrier; Vasquez; Oliver	2:53
7.	"Moteur action"	Perrier; Budet; Echenoz; Mathieu Jomphe	Perrier; Jomphe	3:23
8.	"Florence en Italie"	Perrier; Budet; Echenoz; Walter; Gottwald; Allan Grigg	Perrier; Vasquez; Walter; Gottwald; Grigg	4:14
9.	"Un jour viendra"	Perrier; Budet; Walter; Gottwald	Perrier; Walter; Gottwald	3:31
10.	"Nuit de baise II"	Perrier; Oliver	Oliver	1:20
11.	"Jeune fille garnement"	Perrier; Budet; Echenoz; Vasquez	Perrier; Vasquez	4:22
12.	"Dire qu'on va tous mourir"	Perrier; Budet; Goldstein	Perrier; Goldstein	1:34
13.	"Bouquet final"	Perrier; Budet; Echenoz; Vasquez	Perrier; Vasquez	4:14
Total length:				41:58

Complètement fou — iTunes bonus track
No.	Title	Length
14.	"Je t'adore" (Bonus)	3:25
Total length:		45:23

== Charts ==
Chart (2014)	Peak position
French Albums (SNEP)	52
Belgian Albums (Ultratop Wallonia)	157
US Heatseekers Albums (Billboard)	24
US Top Dance Albums (Billboard)	9
