= Près de toi =

Studio album by Lorie
- Released: October 30, 2001
- Genre: Pop, dance-pop
- Length: 38:35
- Label: EGP
- Producer: Johnny Williams

Lorie chronology
Près de toi (2001)	Tendrement (2002)

Singles from Près de toi
- 1. "Près de moi" Released: 2 May 2001; 2. "Je serai (ta meilleure amie)" Released: 16 October 2001; 3. "Toute seule" Released: 19 March 2002

Près de toi ("Next To You") is French pop singer Lorie's triple-platinum debut album. It was released on October 30, 2001. On April 29, 2002, a special limited edition of the album was released with new packaging and extra tracks. Starting from September 20, 2004, the original album was sold jointly with the singer's second album, Tendrement.

== Versions ==
A deluxe version of "Près de toi" was released with two new bonus tracks: "By My Side", an adaptation of "Près de moi", "Ton Sourire" ("Your Smile"), and remixes of the original songs. Moreover, this version included a special booklet with lyrics and photos.

The album was also out in a new version in Japan mainly because Lorie was appearing in a commercial for Évian and she had to promote the product so the album was released there with a new cover and a special French/Japanese booklet that included all the songs' lyrics in the two languages. Also, new songs were added: "Dans nos rêves" ("In Our Dreams") which was used in the Évian advertisement, "Forget Me Not", another adaptation of "Près de moi" and "My World", an adaptation of "Toute Seule". In addition, the album is also available on radio cassette.

== Track listings ==
=== Standard edition ===
1. "Intro" – 0:19
2. "Près de moi" – 3:43
3. "Je serai (ta meilleure amie)" – 3:28
4. "Toute seule" – 3:31
5. "I Love You" – 4:03
6. "Ne me dis rien" – 4:08
7. "L'homme de ma vie" – 3:25
8. "Tout pour toi" – 3:32
9. "Entre vous deux" – 3:46
10. "Je manque de toi" – 3:47
11. "Se donner la main" – 4:11

=== Limited edition ===
1. "Intro" – 0:19
2. "Près de moi" – 3:43
3. "Je serai (ta meilleure amie)" – 3:28
4. "Toute seule" – 3:31
5. "I Love You" – 4:03
6. "Ne me dis rien" – 4:08
7. "L'homme de ma vie" – 3:25
8. "Tout pour toi" – 3:32
9. "Entre vous deux" – 3:46
10. "Je manque de toi" – 3:47
11. "Se donner la main" – 4:11
12. "By my side" – 3:43
13. "I Love You (sunny remix)" – 3:41
14. "Près de moi (cutty remix)" – 4:24
15. "Près de moi (groovy club mix)" – 4:55
16. "Toute seule (tam tam remix)" – 3:36
17. "Je serai (ta meilleure amie) (friendly remix)" – 4:21
18. "Ton sourire" – 3:45

=== Japanese edition ===
1. Dans nos rêves (3:12)
2. Intro (0:20)
3. Près de moi (3:42)
4. Je serai (ta meilleure amie) (3:28)
5. Toute seule (3:28)
6. I Love You (4:05)
7. Ne me dis rien (4:07)
8. L'homme de ma vie (3:27)
9. Tout pour toi (3:42)
10. Entre vous deux (3:45)
11. Je manque de toi (3:52)
12. Se donner la main (4:23)
13. Forget me not (3:44)
14. My world (3:30)

== Certifications ==
Region	Certification	Certified units/sales
Belgium (BEA)	Gold	15,000^{*}
Canada (Music Canada)	Platinum	100,000^{^}
France (SNEP)	3× Platinum	900,000^{*}
Switzerland (IFPI Switzerland)	Gold	20,000^{^}
^{*} Sales figures based on certification alone.^{^} Shipments figures based on certification alone.

== Charts ==
Chart (2002)	Peak position
Belgian (Wallonia) Albums Chart	8
French Albums Chart	2
Swiss Albums Chart	18

End of the year chart (2001)	Position
French Albums Chart	24
End of the year chart (2002)	Position
Belgian (Wallonia) Albums Chart	28
Canadian Albums (Nielsen SoundScan)	72
French Albums Chart	18
