= Je vais vite =

Single by Lorie

from the album 2lor en moi ?
- Released: 23 September 2007 (digital download); 3 December 2007 (single and maxi)
- Recorded: France
- Genre: Dance-pop; electropop
- Length: 3:33
- Label: Sony BMG, Columbia, Vogue
- Songwriter(s): Asdorve
- Producer(s): Fred Chateau

Lorie singles chronology
"Fashion Victim" (2006)	"Je vais vite" (2007)	"Play" (2008)

Alternative cover
- CD maxi - CD promo

Music video
- "Je vais vite" on YouTube

"Je vais vite" is the name of the 2007 song recorded by French singer Lorie. It was released as the first single from her fifth studio album, 2lor en moi ?. It was first made available for download on 23 September 2007 and was later released as a physical single on 3 December 2007. The song, which has dance and electro sonorities, achieved success in France, and Belgium (Wallonia).

== Promotion ==
"Je vais vite" became Lorie's very first club hit; its style was compared to Kylie Minogue's and it officially became Lorie's first break into the dance scene. Lorie helped promote the song by performing on shows such as Star Academy (France) and Hit Machine. She was also a guest on multifarious French shows between October 2007 and January 2008. Many magazines interviewed Lorie who talked about the song and its remixes, her style's metamorphosis and her new look. The following single, "Play", didn't achieve the same success.

== Music video ==
The music video for "Je vais vite" became a favorite on many music channels; it featured dancers performing the then-new dance tecktonik and Lorie dancing all along. Other versions were made available for the song's remixes. The videos aired on most of the French music channels.

== Track listings ==
After the official physical release of "Je vais vite", a CD containing remixes was released in order to help promote both the single and its parent album. Lorie explained in an interview that the remixes CD was released because of the amassing number of remixes for "Je vais vite" and its ascending club play.

CD single

1. "Je vais vite" — 3:33
2. "Je vais vite" (spencer & hill radio mix) — 3:38
3. "Lonely" (thriller jill radio edit) 2AM featuring Lorie — 2:53

CD maxi

1. "Je vais vite" (spencer & hill 12" mix) — 6:08
2. "Je vais vite" (thriller jill 12" mix) — 8:11
3. "Je vais vite" (Benoît Courti 12" mix) — 4:55
4. "Je vais vite" (asdorve original extended mix) — 5:48

CD single - Promo

1. "Je vais vite" — 3:33

CD single - Remixes

Digital download

1. "Je vais vite" — 3:33
2. "Je vais vite" (spencer & hill radio mix) — 3:38
3. "Je vais vite" (spencer & hill 12" mix) — 6:08
4. "Je vais vite" (thriller jill 12" mix) — 8:11
5. "Je vais vite" (Benoît Courti 12" mix) — 4:55
6. "Je vais vite" (asdorve original extended mix) — 5:48
7. "Je vais vite" (remix funky town) — 3:26

== Charts ==
=== Weekly charts ===
Chart (2007)	Peak position
Belgian (Wallonia) Singles Chart	7
French Digital Chart	13
French Singles Chart	3
French TV Music Videos Chart	3

=== Year-end charts ===
Chart (2007)	Position
French Singles Chart	62
Chart (2008)	Position
Belgian (Wallonia) Singles Chart	19
Eurochart Hot 100	70
French Singles Chart	47
