= Toute seule =

Single by Lorie

from the album Près de Toi
- B-side: "By My Side"
- Released: 19 March 2002
- Recorded: France
- Genre: Dance-pop
- Length: 3:29
- Label: EGP
- Songwriter(s): Johnny Williams, Louis Element
- Producer(s): Johnny Williams, Louis Element

Lorie singles chronology
"Je serai (ta meilleure amie)" (2001)	"Toute seule" (2002)	"J'ai besoin d'amour" (2002)

Music video
- "Toute seule" on YouTube

"Toute seule" is the name of a 2002 song recorded by the French artist Lorie. The song was released on 19 March 2002 as third and last single from her debut album, Près de Toi, on which it features as fourth track (and as 16th track on a remixed version). It was a top ten hit in France, and a top 15 hit in Belgium (Wallonia).

== Song information ==
The music video, shot at Studio Canadian, was directed by Vincent Egret and produced by Plein Sud Films. In the lyrics, the singer says she prefers to remain alone instead of dating with a stupid boy.

The song is included on Lorie's best of, Best of. As it was performed on the singer's three tours, it also features on the live albums Live Tour (third track), Week End Tour and Live Tour 2006 (included in a medley, 12th track). It also appears on many compilations, such as Hitbox 2002 - Best Of vol. 4.

== Chart performance ==
"Toute seule" charted for 27 weeks on the French Singles Chart. It started at number 17 on 23 March 2002, then peaked at number eight for three consecutive weeks, and totalled twenty weeks in the top 50. It achieved Gold status, and was the 46th best-selling of the year.

In Belgium (Wallonia), it debuted at number 29 on 30 March and peaked at number 12 for three non consecutive weeks, remaining for nine weeks in the top 20 and 16 weeks in the top 40. It was ranked 46th on the Annual Chart. "Toute seule" charted for six weeks in the Swiss top 100, peaking at number 44 in its debut, on 19 May.

== Track listings ==
- CD single
1. "Toute seule" (edit video) — 3:33
2. "Toute seule" (tam tam remix) — 3:35
- CD limite édition
1. "Toute seule" (edit video) — 3:29
2. "By My Side" — 3:41
3. "Toute seule" (tam tam remix) — 3:36

+ 6 Stickers.

- Digital download
1. "Toute seule" (album version) — 3:31
2. "Toute seule" (2003 live version) — 3:35
3. "Toute seule" (2004 live version) — 3:54

== Charts ==
=== Weekly charts ===
Weekly chart performance for "Toute seule"
Chart (2002)	Peak position
Belgium (Ultratop 50 Wallonia)	12
France (SNEP)	8
Switzerland (Schweizer Hitparade)	44

=== Year-end charts ===
Year-end chart performance for "Toute seule"
Chart (2002)	Position
Belgium (Utratop 50 Wallonia)	46
France (SNEP)	46

== Certifications ==
Certifications for "Toute seule"
Region	Certification	Certified units/sales
France (SNEP)	Gold	250,000^{*}
^{*} Sales figures based on certification alone.
