= Yelle =

French band

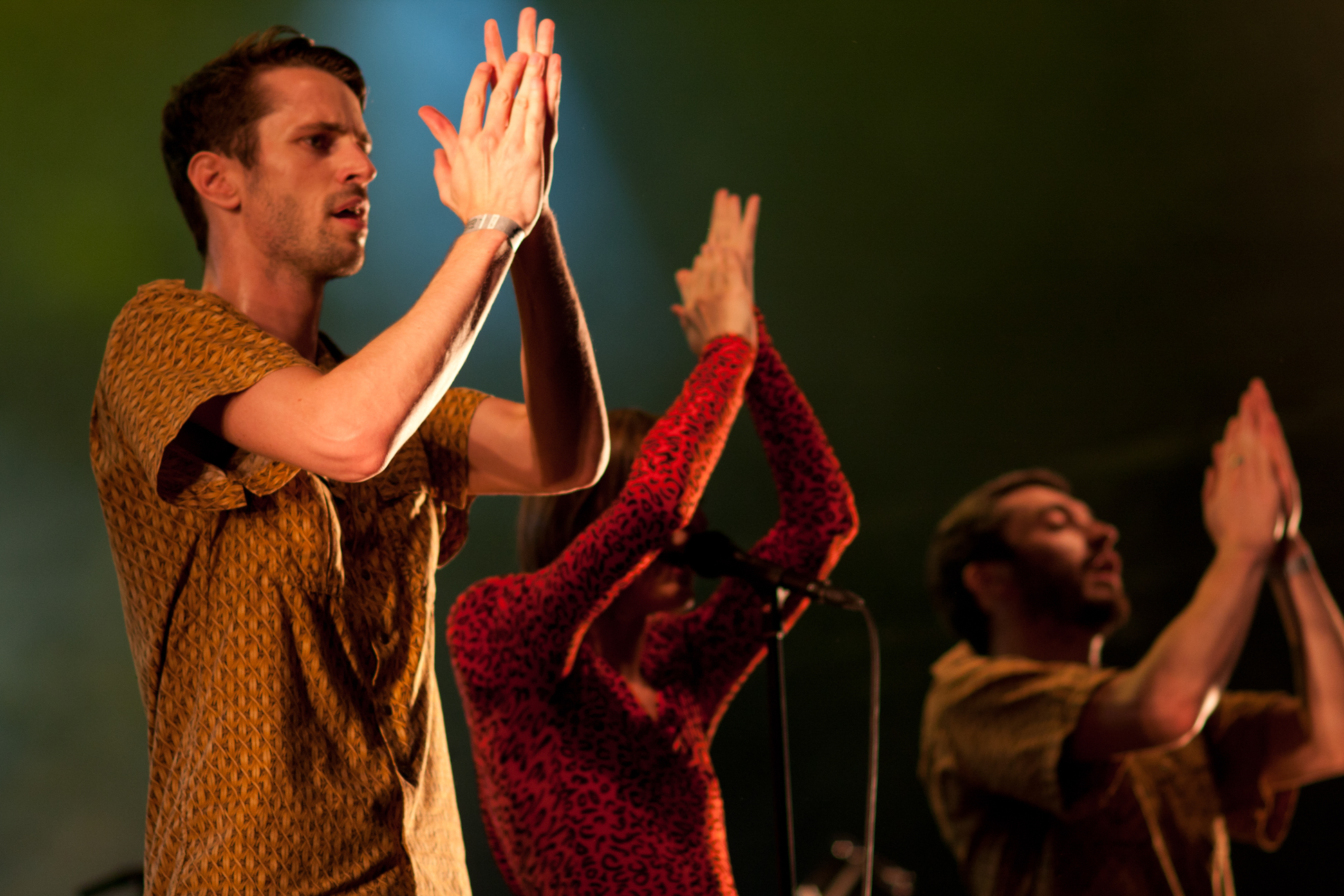
- Yelle performing in 2011

Background information
- Origin: France
- Genre: Electropop
- Years active: 2005–present
- Labels: Source Etc; Recreation Center; Barclay; Caroline; Kemosabe; Because
- Members: Yelle; GrandMarnier; Franck Richard (touring member)
- Past members: Tepr
- Website: yelle.fr

Yelle is a French electronic band founded by lead singer and namesake Yelle (Julie Budet) and GrandMarnier (Jean-François Perrier). A third member, Tepr (Tanguy Destable), joined the band before the recording of their debut album. Yelle and GrandMarnier began working on music together in 2000. The band came to prominence when it posted an early version of the song "Je veux te voir" on MySpace in September 2005, which later reached the top five in France. The success of the song on MySpace attracted the attention of a record label, which set them to work on their debut album, Pop Up, which was released in 2007. The group's second album, Safari Disco Club, was released in 2011, their third, Complètement fou, in 2014, and their fourth, L'Ère du Verseau in 2020.

They have enjoyed a significant following overseas in non-French-speaking countries as well. They toured internationally in support of each of their album releases and have played at Coachella three times.

== History ==
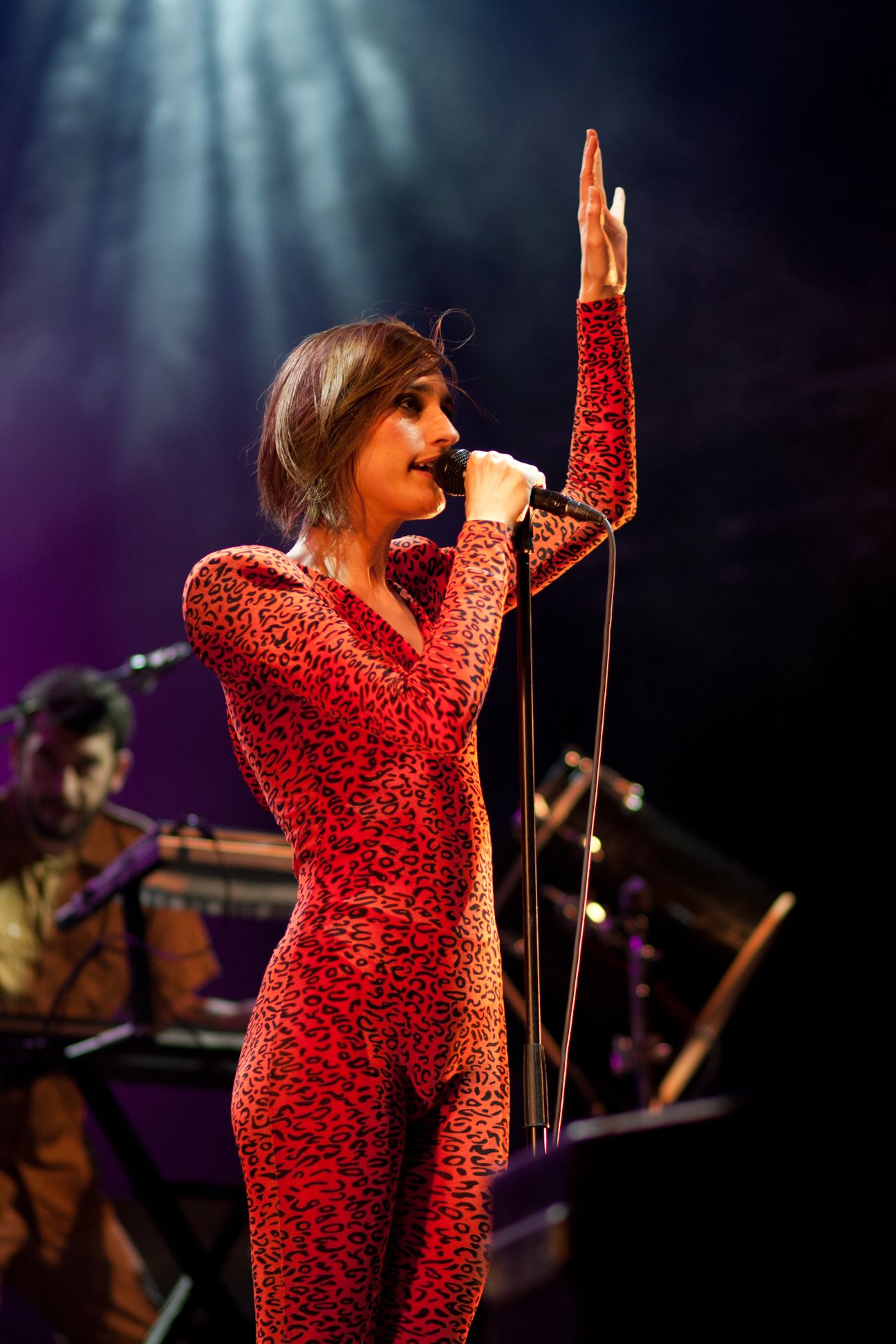
Yelle performing live in 2011

Budet met and became good friends with producer GrandMarnier in 2000, and in 2005, they began making music together when both wanted to start an electropop band. The name of the band, Yelle, began as an acronym of the phrase "You Enjoy Life", "YEL", but was later feminised to "Yelle" because a Belgian band had the name already. Yelle rose to fame on MySpace when they posted a song titled "Short Dick Cuizi", which later became "Je veux te voir", in late 2005. The song's original title refers to Cuizinier of French alternative hip-hop band TTC and was released as a mock diss track. It received a positive response and soon attracted the attention of record label Source Etc. The song later charted at No. 4 in France. Yelle then began working on and recording their debut album, Pop Up, in 2006. While performing at night, producer Tepr had been roped into the band in 2007 after meeting GrandMarnier while working as a journalist. They were in need of a keyboard player on tour.

Pop Up was released in September 2007. AllMusic called it "a perfect storm of glossy production values, smart songwriting, and Budet's sparkling delivery." The album produced another single, "A cause des garçons", which reached number eleven on the French Singles Chart. Yelle was featured on Fatal Bazooka's French number-one song "Parle à ma main" in 2007. The band has enjoyed success outside France despite making songs exclusively in French and have toured extensively overseas in non-French-speaking countries. In the US, they were featured as MTV's Artist of the Week at the end of March 2008. After touring for three years, Yelle took three months off – until September 2009, when they began working on their next album. By February 2010, they had started their own record label, Recreation Center, overseen by GrandMarnier.

Yelle's second album, Safari Disco Club, was released in March 2011. Budet explained that unlike their debut, there was no deadline for the album because they were on their own label, thus allowing them to focus more on the harmonies and melodies and Budet's singing voice. They were also able to focus on writing and recording the album for a year as opposed to having to perform at night like for Pop Up. The album received generally favourable reviews, with the Independent declaring that the album was "essential for anyone who appreciates dancefloor-friendly European synth pop." The title track was released for free on their website in January 2011 and was released as a double single with "Que veux-tu". Katy Perry asked them to open for her on her 2011 California Dreams Tour in the UK. They embarked on their own tour afterwards, returning to the US in the fall. On 11 February 2013, the band released the single "L'amour parfait".

In July 2014, it was announced that Yelle's third studio album, Complètement fou, was planned for release in late September 2014. The album was co-produced by Dr. Luke and his team of producers (Kojak, AC, Billboard Mat, Oliver, Cirkut, Jmike, Madmax), who discovered Yelle through their remix of Katy Perry's "Hot n Cold" and a live show in Los Angeles. Dr. Luke eventually signed Yelle to his vanity label, Kemosabe Records. The album was preceded by the single "Bouquet final", for which a lyric video premiered on 30 June 2014. Complètement fou was released on 29 September 2014 through Kemosabe and followed by an extensive international tour that saw the band play at Coachella for the third time in their career as well as all over Europe, the Americas, and China. The band released a song titled "OMG!!!" on 21 August 2018 and a song titled "Je t'aime encore" on 28 April 2020.

== Artistry ==
For their first two albums, GrandMarnier and Tepr produced the music, while Budet co-wrote the lyrics with GrandMarnier. While working on their second album and meeting with American labels, they were repeatedly queried about singing in English in the future. However, Yelle maintain that they would not be able to express themselves in a language that they were not familiar with. Singing French songs to many non-francophone audiences all over the world led Yelle to launch her own Yelle Translator companion app (developed by Pomp & Clout) in 2014. The app works to decode lyric videos from the album Complètement fou by letting the user choose whether they'd like to view the original French lyrics or the English translation by holding their phone up to the music video screen and selecting a language. The user is also able to toggle between the languages in real time. Their debut album Pop Up, is of the electropop genre with 1980s influences. Their lyrics are playful and sarcastic. The debut single "Je veux te voir" was a humorous reply to the misogynist lyrics of some French rappers, especially Cuizinier of TTC. For Safari Disco Club, they retained the sound of Pop Up while incorporating more rhythmic drums into the production, such as Caribbean influences and new wave influences in the synthesizers. Budet described it as a marriage between "hotter rhythms and cooler synthesizer", highlighting the sense of humor and melancholy coexisting in the lyrics as well. The melancholy was attributed to Yelle having toured for three years for their first album and having that experience abruptly end to begin work on their next album.

For their third album, Completement fou, the band collaborated with American music producer, Dr. Luke. Luke and his team of producers brought a new focus on melody rather than the beats-driven approach that Yelle previously had to songwriting.

Budet's colorful stage outfits are influenced by designers such as Jeremy Scott, Andrea Crews, Jean-Paul Lespagnard and Jean-Charles de Castelbajac.

== Discography ==
=== Studio albums ===
List of studio albums, with selected chart positions, sales figures and certifications
Title	Album details	Peak chart positions				Certifications
Title	Album details	FRA	BEL (WA)	SPA	US Dance	Certifications
Pop Up	Released: 3 September 2007; Label: Source Etc.; Formats: CD, LP, digital download	61	—	—	8	SNEP: Silver
Safari Disco Club	Released: 14 March 2011; Label: Recreation Center, Cooperative Music/PIAS, Barclay/Universal; Formats: CD, LP, digital download	77	76	92	9	
Complètement fou	Released: 29 September 2014; Label: Kemosabe, Because Music; Formats: CD, LP, digital download	52	157	—	9	
L'Ère du Verseau	Released: 4 September 2020; Label: Recreation Center; Formats: CD, LP, digital download	74	138	—	—	
"—" denotes a recording that did not chart or was not released in that territory.

=== Extended plays ===
Title	Album details
iTunes Festival: London 2008	Released: 18 July 2008; Label: Source etc.; Format: Digital download
The Contest Pack	Released: 20 February 2012; Label: Recreation Center; Format: Digital download
Complètement fou (Remix)	Released: 24 July 2015; Label: Kemosabe Records, Because Music; Format: Digital download

=== Singles ===
==== As lead artist ====
List of singles as lead artist, with selected chart positions, showing year released and album name
Title	Year	Peak chart positions				Album
Title	Year	FRA	BEL (FL)	BEL (WA)	SWI	Album
"Je veux te voir"	2006	4	—	— (Note: "Je veux te voir" did not enter the Ultratop 50, but peaked at number 10 on the Walloon Ultratip chart.)	—	Pop Up
"A cause des garçons"	2007	11	— (Note: "À cause des garçons" did not enter the Ultratop 50, but peaked at number two on the Flemish Ultratip chart.)	40	95	Pop Up
"Ce jeu"	2008	—	—	—	—	Pop Up
"La musique"	2010	—	—	—	—	Safari Disco Club
"Safari Disco Club"	2011	—	—	—	—	Safari Disco Club
"Que veux-tu"	2011	—	—	— (Note: "Que veux-tu" did not enter the Ultratop 50, but peaked at number 14 on the Walloon Ultratip chart.)	—	Safari Disco Club
"Comme un enfant"	2011	—	—	—	—	Safari Disco Club
"L'amour parfait"	2013	—	—	—	—	—N/a
"Bouquet final"	2014	—	—	—	—	Complètement fou
"Complètement fou"	2014	113	—	—	—	Complètement fou
"Ba$$in"	2015	—	—	—	—	Complètement fou
"Un million"	2016	—	—	—	—	L'Ère du Verseau
"Ici & Maintenant"	2016	—	—	—	—	Bops EP
"Interpassion"	2017	—	—	—	—	Bops EP
"Romeo"	2017	—	—	—	—	Bops EP
"OMG!!!"	2018	—	—	—	—	Bops EP
"Je t'aime encore"	2020	—	—	—	—	L'Ère du Verseau
"Noir"	2021	—	—	—	—	L'Ère du Verseau
"Top Fan"	2023	—	—	—	—	TBA
"—" denotes a recording that did not chart or was not released in that territory.

==== As featured artist ====
List of singles as featured artist, with selected chart positions, showing year released and album name
Title	Year	Peak chart positions				Album
Title	Year	FRA	BEL (FL)	BEL (WA)	SWI	Album
"Parle à ma main" (Fatal Bazooka featuring Yelle)	2007	1	—	1	31	T'as vu
"Cooler couleur" (Crookers featuring Yelle)	2010	—	32	—	—	Tons of Friends

=== Music videos ===
List of music videos, showing year released and directors
Title	Year	Director(s)
"À cause des garçons"	2007	Nima Nourizadeh
"À cause des garçons" (Tepr Remix)	2007	Bastien Lattanzio and Guillaume Berg
"Je veux te voir"	2008	Nicolas Benamou
"Ce jeu"	2008	Yoann Lemoine
"La musique"	2010	We Are from L.A
"Safari Disco Club"/"Que veux-tu"	2011	Jérémie Saindon
"Comme un enfant"	2011	Jérémie Saindon
"Complètement fou"	2014	Milord and L'Étiquette
"Ba$$in"	2015	Diane Martel and Geoffrey Lillemon
"Moteur Action"	2015	Aleksandra Kingo and Dmitry Yermolayev
"Ici & Maintenant (Here & Now)"	2016	Paul B. Cummings & Jean-François Perrier
"Interpassion"	2017	Thibault Maîtrejean & Jean-François Perrier

=== Guest appearances ===
List of non-single guest appearances, with other performing artists, showing year released and album name
Title	Year	Other artist	Album
"Hot n Cold" (Yelle Remix)	2008	Katy Perry	—N/a
"Who's That Girl? (Qui est cette fille?)"	2009	Robyn	iTunes Foreign Exchange #2
"Ophélie"	2010	Nouvelle Vague	Couleurs sur Paris
"Emmène-moi au Futur"	2011	Tomoya Ohtani	Girls Make the World Go 'Round: Sega Vocal Traxx
"Heterotopia"	2017	Oliver	Full Circle
"Diane"	2019	Dad	Music
"Box of Stars Pt. 1"	2024	Jacob Collier	Djesse Vol. 4

== Tours ==
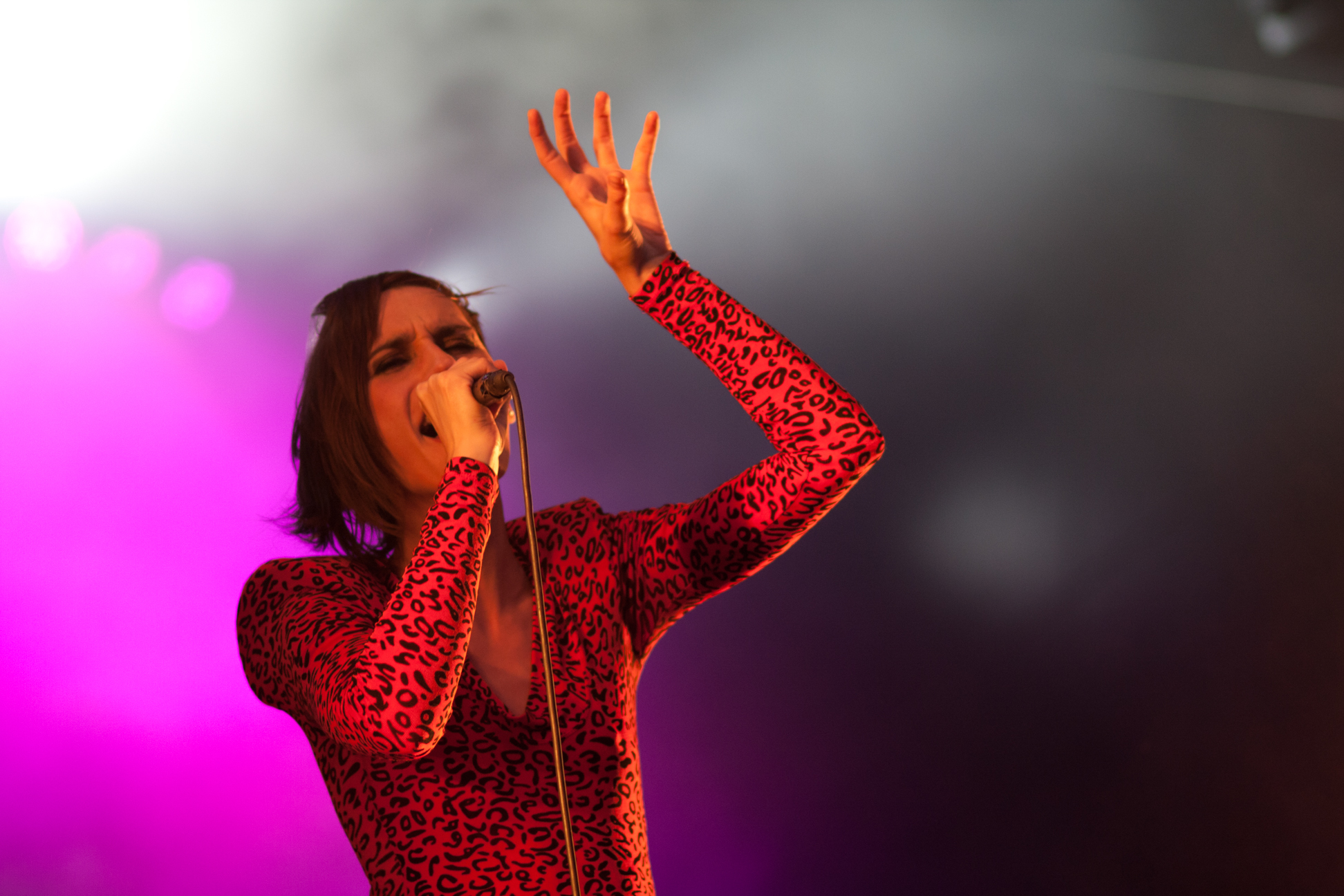
Yelle at the Brussels Summer Festival during the Safari Disco Tour, 2011

Over the course of several albums, Yelle has embarked on multiple world tours. The C’est l’Amérique Tour (2008–2009) helped the album Pop-Up reach new international audiences, especially in the Americas. The Safari Disco Tour (2011–2012) promoted Safari Disco Club across more than 150 shows throughout North America, Latin America, Asia, Japan, Hong Kong and Australia.

The group continued touring internationally with the Fall Tour (2014–2015, 43 shows) and the Yelle Club Party Tour (2017–2019, 62 shows) in support of Complètement fou. This was followed by the European L’Ère du Verseau Tour (2020–2021, 53 shows) and the U.S. Wanna Dance and Cry Tour (2023, 5 shows), both promoting L’Ère du Verseau.

In 2025, to celebrate its 20th anniversary, Yelle launched a new tour across Europe and North America. However, the North American leg was cancelled due to what the group described as a “very worrying political climate” in the United States and rising touring costs.

=== Tour history ===
Year(s)	Tour name	Album supported	Number of shows
2008	C’est l’Amérique Tour	Pop-Up	200
2009	C’est l’Amérique Tour	Pop-Up	200
2011	Safari Disco Tour	Safari Disco Club	150
2012	Safari Disco Tour	Safari Disco Club	150
2014	Fall Tour	Complètement fou	
2015	Fall Tour	Complètement fou	
2017	Club Party Tour	Complètement fou	62
2019	Club Party Tour	Complètement fou	62
2020	L'Ère du Verseau Tour	L'Ère du Verseau	53
2021	L'Ère du Verseau Tour	L'Ère du Verseau	53
2023	Wanna Dance and Cry Tour	L'Ère du Verseau	5
2025	Yelle 20th Anniversary Tour	All releases	10
