= J'ai besoin d'amour =

Single by Lorie

from the album Tendrement
- B-side: "Remix"
- Released: 1 October 2002
- Recorded: France
- Genre: Pop
- Length: 3:40
- Label: EGP
- Songwriter(s): Johnny Williams, Pierre Billon
- Producer(s): Johnny Williams

Lorie singles chronology
"Toute seule" (2002)	"J'ai besoin d'amour" (2002)	"À 20 ans" (2003)

Music video
- "J'ai besoin d'amour" on YouTube

"J'ai besoin d'amour" ("I Need Love") is the name of a 2002 song recorded by the French singer Lorie. It was released on 1 October 2002 as the first single from her second album Tendrement, on which it features as second and 13th tracks, in the original and acoustic versions. The song achieved success in France, where it was a top ten hit.

== Song information ==
Written by Johnny Williams and Pierre Billon, the song refers to the need for affection of the singer. In the music video, Lorie sings "J'ai besoin d'amour" near a pool in which a dolphin is performing acrobatics. It was shot at the Parc Astérix in Plailly, by Vincent Egret, and was directed by Plein Sud Films. A second CD single was released on 11 November 2002.

The song was also performed during Lorie's first and second tours and was thus included on the live albums Live Tour and Week End Tour, respectively as 18th and 5th tracks. It was included in a medley on the Live Tour 2006. It is also available on Lorie's first compilation Best of as third track. The song appears on many French compilations, such as Hits 2002, Un maxx' de tubes vol. 2 and Stars France 2003.

An English version of the song, re-entitled "When I Think About You" was also recorded. It was available digitally and on the promotional maxi CD of "J'ai besoin d'amour".

== Chart performance ==
In France, the single entered the chart at number 91, on 28 September 2002, although it was officially released three days later. It then jumped to a peak of number seven and remained for 14 weeks in the top 20, 18 weeks in the top 50 and 23 weeks in the top 100. It was certified Gold disc in 2002 by the SNEP, and ranked at number 40 on the End of the Year Chart.

In Belgium (Wallonia), it appeared for 16 weeks on the Ultratop 40, peaking at number 15 in its second week, on 19 October. In Switzerland, it charted for 15 weeks and reached number 24 on 8 December.

== Track listings ==
- CD single 1
1. "J'ai besoin d'amour" (radio edit) — 3:40
2. "J'ai besoin d'amour" (Celtic mix) — 4:11
3. "J'ai besoin d'amour" (fortress mix) — 4:10
- CD single 2
1. "J'ai besoin d'amour" (radio edit) — 3:40
2. "J'ai besoin d'amour" (instrumental version) — 3:40
3. "J'ai besoin d'amour" (acoustic version) — 3:08
- Digital download
1. "J'ai besoin d'amour" (album version) — 3:33
2. "J'ai besoin d'amour" (acoustic version) — 3:08
3. "J'ai besoin d'amour" (2003 live) — 4:28
4. "J'ai besoin d'amour" (2004 live) — 5:28
- CD single - Promo
1. "J'ai besoin d'amour" (radio edit) — 3:40
- CD maxi - Promo
1. "J'ai besoin d'amour" (radio edit) — 3:40
2. "When I Think About You" — 3:48
3. "J'ai besoin d'amour" (instrumental version) — 3:40
- CD single - Promo - UK
1. "When I Think About You" — 3:48

== Charts ==
=== Weekly charts ===
Weekly chart performance for "J'ai besoin d'amour"
Chart (2002)	Peak position
Belgium (Ultratop 50 Wallonia)	15
France (SNEP)	7
Switzerland (Schweizer Hitparade)	24

=== Year-end charts ===
Year-end chart performance for "J'ai besoin d'amour"
Chart (2002)	Position
Belgium (Ultratop 50 Wallonia)	91
France (SNEP)	40

== Certifications ==
Certifications for "J'ai besoin d'amour"
Region	Certification	Certified units/sales
France (SNEP)	Gold	250,000^{*}
^{*} Sales figures based on certification alone.
