= UEFA Euro 2008 (video game) =

2008 video game

- Developers: EA Canada (PS3, Xbox 360); HB Studios (PS2, PSP, PC)
- Publisher: EA Sports
- Series: UEFA Euro
- Platforms: Microsoft Windows; PlayStation 2 PlayStation 3 PlayStation Portable; Xbox 360
- Release: AU: 17 April 2008; EU: 18 April 2008; NA: 19 May 2008 (PS2, PS3, PSP, X360)
- Genre: Sports
- Modes: Single-player, Multiplayer

UEFA Euro 2008 is the official video game of the Euro 2008 football tournament, published by EA Sports. It was developed collaboratively by EA Canada and HB Studios and was released in Europe and North America on 18 April 2008 and 19 May 2008 respectively. The commentary was provided by Clive Tyldesley and Andy Townsend.

== Anthem mistake ==
EA issued an apology after mistakenly using the Soldier's Song as Northern Ireland's anthem within the game, instead of God Save the Queen. Public Relations head Shaun White said:

At EA Sports, we pride ourselves on delivering rich and authentic videogame experiences. We sincerely apologise for this error.

The apology was welcomed by Northern Irish Culture, Arts and Leisure Minister Gregory Campbell who said:

Any apology on this matter is most welcome. Obviously there's has been a lack of knowledge on the makers' part and hopefully it will be changed as soon as possible.

== Reception ==
Reception

Aggregate score
Aggregator	Score				
Aggregator	PC	PS2	PS3	PSP	Xbox 360
Metacritic	66/100	77/100	79/100	68/100	80/100

Review scores
Publication	Score				
Publication	PC	PS2	PS3	PSP	Xbox 360
1Up.com	N/A	N/A	B+	N/A	B+
Eurogamer	N/A	N/A	N/A	N/A	8/10
GameSpot	N/A	N/A	8/10	N/A	8/10
GameSpy	N/A	N/A	3.5/5	N/A	3.5/5
GameTrailers	N/A	N/A	7.3/10	N/A	7.3/10
GameZone	N/A	6/10	8.7/10	N/A	8.7/10
IGN	N/A	7.3/10	(US) 8.1/10 (UK) 8/10	6.8/10	(US) 8.1/10 (UK) 8/10
Official Xbox Magazine (US)	N/A	N/A	N/A	N/A	7.5/10
PC Gamer (UK)	50%	N/A	N/A	N/A	N/A
PlayStation: The Official Magazine	N/A	N/A	4/5	N/A	N/A
411Mania	N/A	N/A	N/A	N/A	8.5/10
Digital Spy	N/A	N/A	N/A	N/A	4/5

The PlayStation 2, PlayStation 3 and Xbox 360 versions received "generally favorable reviews", while the PSP and PC versions received "average" reviews, according to the review aggregation website Metacritic.
