= Je serai (ta meilleure amie) =

Single by Lorie

from the album Près de Toi
- B-side: "Remix"
- Released: 30 October 2001
- Recorded: France
- Genre: Teen pop
- Length: 3:28
- Label: EGP
- Songwriters: Johnny Williams; Louis Element
- Producers: Johnny Williams; Louis Element

Lorie singles chronology
"Près de moi" (2001)	"Je serai (ta meilleure amie)" (2001)	"Toute seule" (2002)

Music video
- "Je serai (ta meilleure amie)" on YouTube

"Je serai (ta meilleure amie)" is a 2001 song recorded by the French singer Lorie. It was released on 30 October 2001 as the second single from her debut album, Près de Toi, on which it features as third track. The song achieved success in Belgium (Wallonia) and France, but its sales and chart positions were lower than those of the previous single, "Près de moi".

== Song information ==
The song, which deals with the friendship between the singer and her best female friend, was composed and produced by Johnny Williams and Louis Element. The music video was shot in Mexico and was directed by Vincent Egret. Lorie's real-life best friend took part in the filming. In an interview aired in 2021, Lorie explained that the shooting of the music video was difficult because of the extreme weather in the Mexican jungle. The September 11 attacks delayed the release of the music video.

Lorie performed the song during her first tour and it was included in a live version on her 2003 album Live Tour, as the 13th track. It also features on Lorie's 2005 best of, just titled Best of (11th track), and on many French compilations, such as Just Girls.

== Chart performance ==
"Je serai (ta meilleure amie)" debuted at number five on the French Singles Chart, on 17 November 2001, peaked at this position for four nonconsecutive weeks, and remained in the top ten for 12 weeks. Then it dropped on the chart and totaled 20 weeks in the top 50 and 22 weeks on the chart (top 100). It achieved Gold status, and was ranked 37th and 58th on the 2001 and 2002 year-end charts, respectively.

In Belgium (Wallonia), "Je serai (ta meilleure amie)" charted for twenty weeks from 1 December 2001. It entered at number 29, reached the top ten two weeks later and hit number five for two weeks. It remained for ten weeks in the top ten. It was certified Gold disc, and was number 68 on the Annual Chart. It also charted for eight weeks on the Swiss Singles Chart, peaking at number 25 in the first week, on 27 January 2002.

== Track listings ==
- CD single
1. "Je serai (ta meilleure amie)" (radio edit) — 3:28
2. "Je serai (ta meilleure amie)" (groove radio remix) — 3:24
- CD single - Limited edition
1. "Je serai (ta meilleure amie)" (radio edit) — 3:28
2. "Je serai (ta meilleure amie)" (groove radio remix) — 3:24

+ Poster

- Digital download
1. "Je serai (ta meilleure amie)" (radio edit) — 3:28
2. "Je serai (ta meilleure amie)" (radio edit) (second version) — 4:21
3. "Je serai (ta meilleure amie)" (radio edit) (live) — 5:20

== Charts ==
=== Weekly charts ===
Weekly chart performance for "Je serai (ta meilleure amie)"
Chart (2001–02)	Peak position
Belgium (Ultratop 50 Wallonia)	5
Europe (European Hot 100 Singles)	16
France (SNEP)	5
Switzerland (Schweizer Hitparade)	25

=== Year-end charts ===
2001 year-end chart performance for "Je serai (ta meilleure amie)"
Chart (2001)	Position
France (SNEP)	37

2002 year-end chart performance for "Je serai (ta meilleure amie)"
Chart (2002)	Position
Belgium (Ultratop 50 Wallonia)	68
Europe (Eurochart Hot 100 Singles)	87
France (SNEP)	58

== Certifications ==
Certifications for "Je serai (ta meilleure amie)"
Region	Certification	Certified units/sales
Belgium (BRMA)	Gold	25,000^{*}
France (SNEP)	Gold	250,000^{*}
^{*} Sales figures based on certification alone.
