= Lorie (singer) =

French singer (born 1982)

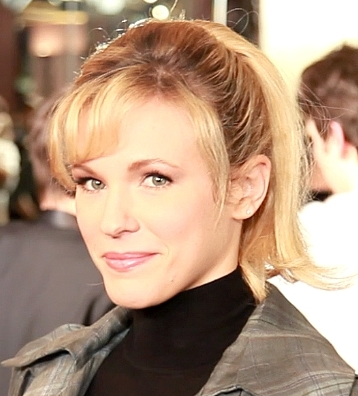
- Lorie in 2012

Background information
- Born: Laure Monique Pester; 2 May 1982 (age 44); Le Plessis-Bouchard, Val d'Oise, France
- Genres: Pop, dance-pop, electropop
- Occupations: Singer, actress
- Years active: 2001–present
- Labels: Epic, Columbia, LMD2
- Website: lorieofficiel.com

Laure Monique Pester (born 2 May 1982), known professionally as Lorie, is a French pop singer. She has sold over 8 million albums and singles worldwide as of December 2007. Her first studio album Près de toi was certified triple platinum in France and she followed it with five other certified albums.

Lorie is also an actress, who lent her voice for many French versions of international movies including Stuart Little 2. She stars in the TF1 TV film De feu et de glace, and guest-starred as a Parisian model on the American soap opera The Young and the Restless. She has also launched a clothing line, "Lorie", only found in the Z stores in France. Her contract with Z ended in early 2009.

== Career ==
=== 2000–2001: First successes ===
When Lorie heard that producer Axel Brangeon was looking for a young girl that knew how to sing and dance, she immediately auditioned and won the contract. Lorie recorded "Près de moi", written by Johnny Williams and Louis Element, which was rejected by every record label. Williams uploaded the song onto a French website, peoplesound" and the song received 15,000+ downloads in two months. Thereafter Epic Group Project of Sony Music France signed Lorie, who was only eighteen at the time. "Près de moi" was officially released in 2001, accompanied by a highly popular music video. It was certified Platinum in France for over 500,000 copies sold. Its parent album "Près de toi", released on October 30, 2001, became a triple Platinum recording in France with 1,000,000+ copies sold. The next singles "Je serai (ta meilleure amie)" and "Toute seule" were also certified Gold.

=== 2002–2003: More successes ===
"Tendrement", Lorie's second album, saw the light in 2002 with three commercially successful singles: "J'ai besoin d'amour", "À 20 ans" and "Sur un air Latino".

The album became as successful as "Près de toi", selling over a million copies in Europe. In April 2002, Lorie sung "Oser ses rêves" for the French soundtrack of the Disney animation film Cinderella II: Dreams Come True and lend her voice for the French version of the movie Stuart Little 2; she is the bird Margalo.

After touring for the promotion of her album, Lorie released a book called "Ma tournée" which sold over 200,000 copies, becoming one of the most successful books ever written by a singer in France. Later, her debut album "Près de toi" would come back to the lights after its release in Japan with new tracks (English versions of her songs "Près de moi" and "Toute Seule") including "Dans mes rêves" which was used in the Évian in which Lorie was starring. She also confirmed her relationship with Filipino-American pop-star Billy Crawford.

In late 2003, Lorie's first live album and music DVD come out, both entitled "Lorie Live Tour" which received a great response.

=== 2004–2006: Attitudes and image change ===
Come early 2004, "Attitudes" was already out and the singles "Week-end", "La positive attitude" and "Ensorcelée" were big hits. The album became Platinum in France because it sold over 600,000 copies. Lorie toured again to promote the album. The song "C'est plus fort que moi", written by Jean-Jacques Goldman, was later released to support the "Week-End Tour". In June, Lorie launched her very own clothing line, simply entitled "Lorie", exclusively sold in the Z stores in France. Her contract with Z was cancelled in early 2009.

In April 2005, Lorie's first compilation album Best Of was released, including all her singles plus "Toi et moi", "Les ventres ronds" (which was performed in the Week-End Tour) and the original version of "Quand tu danses". The album was well-received but some critics said that Lorie was way too young to release a "best-of", noting that Lorie was the youngest artist in French history to release a greatest hits album.

In October 2005, Lorie released Rester la même (which means 'Stay the same'), an album mixing various music influences including Zouk, RnB, pop and dance-pop. Lorie wanted to change her image from squeaky-clean to boogie singer. The title track, featuring rap act Second Degré, was first released to see the reaction which was generally positive, but the song did not perform as well as expected. The following singles "SOS" (reggaeton version), "Parti pour zouker" and "Fashion victim'" (official but promotional single for her Live Tour 2006). This album also received a Platinum certification in France, because it sold over 470,000 copies.

That same year, Lorie voiced the character Violette in the French version of the Academy Award-winning animated film The Incredibles.

=== 2007–2008: The metamorphosis ===
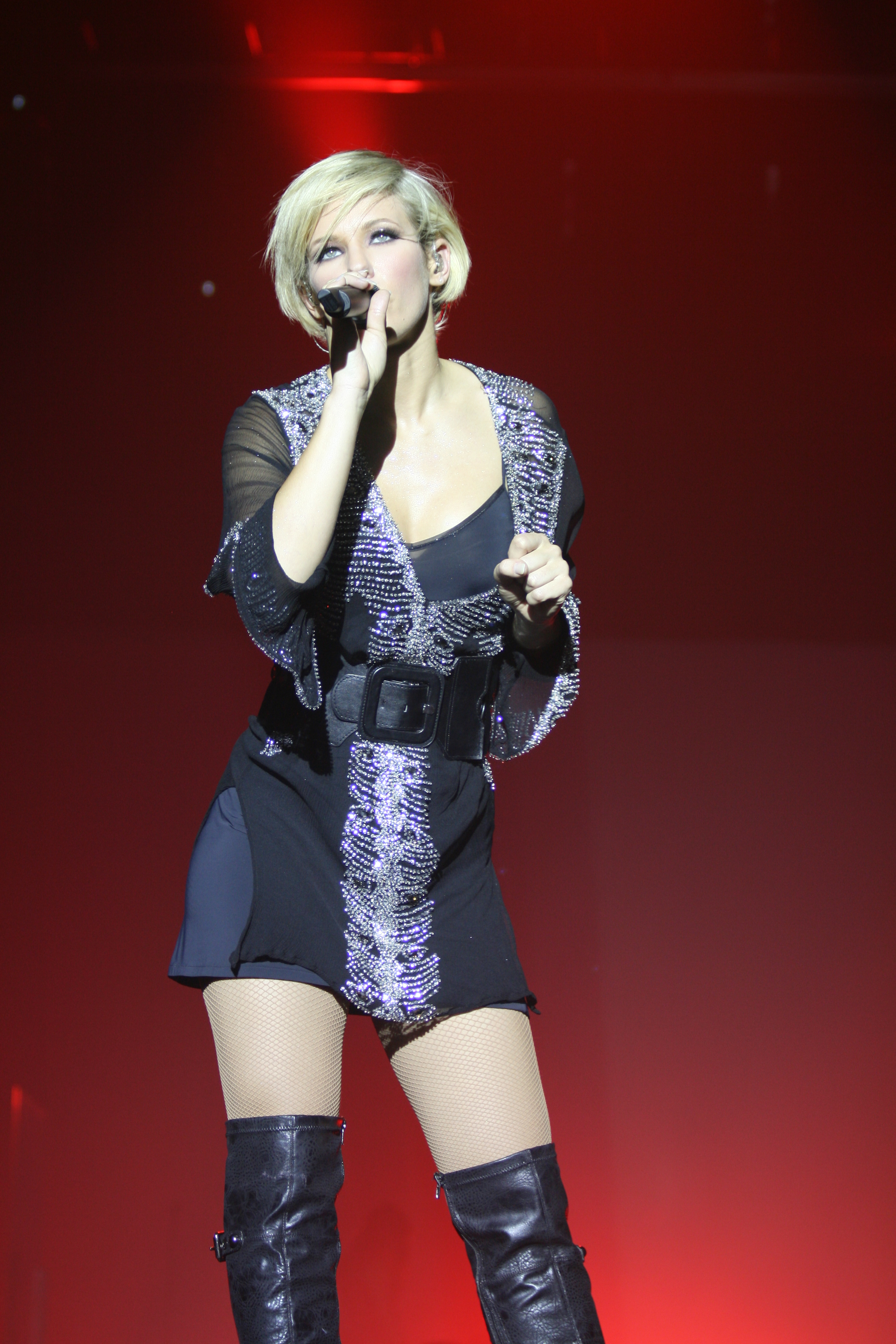
Lorie performing on her tour "2Lor" in Charleroi, Belgium in October 2008

On 26 November 2007, Lorie's fifth studio album 2lor en moi? was released; it was the singer's most mature album and it is clear that the album's sound is influenced by Tecktonik, the then-new dance. The first single from the album "Je vais vite" showcases Lorie's musical and personal evolution. Its follow-up "Play", featuring back vocals by her fiancé Garou, was a worldwide minor club hit. On 3 October 2008 Lorie started her "Le Tour 2Lor", which ended in December 2008 to promote the album. The last single from the album, "Un garçon", officially released in December 2008, talks about homosexuality; the song and the video were harshly received from the French audience and in consequence, it "flopped", as it received little coverage. However, the album was certified Gold for selling at least 185,200 copies as of November 2008.

2lor en moi? was also released on 18 August 2008, in Canada under Garou's record label, Wolfgang Entertainment. Lorie also recorded "Heaven's Table", a critically acclaimed duet with Garou for his latest album. In June 2008, she wanted to try something new: acting. She starred as a lonely and lost ice-skater in the TF1 TV movie De feu et de glace. TF1, satisfied with Lorie's performance, asked her to guest-star as a Parisian model in the successful soap opera The Young and the Restless in October. According to Yo-Club, as of March 2009, Lorie has officially sold about 8 million records worldwide.

=== 2011: Return to music ===
Lorie's album Regardez-moi came out on 21 November 2011, with the first single "Dita" made available to purchase in France via iTunes and Amazon on 26 August 2011. In 2012, she produced a seventh album, Danse, on her own label, LMD2 Production

In 2012, Lorie was one of the contestants during the third season of Danse avec les stars.

== Personal life ==
Lorie was engaged to French-Canadian singer Garou but he decided to break up before the wedding in 2010, when she started a relationship with French actor Philippe Bas that ended in 2012.

Lorie is a member of the Les Enfoirés charity ensemble since 2002.

== Discography ==
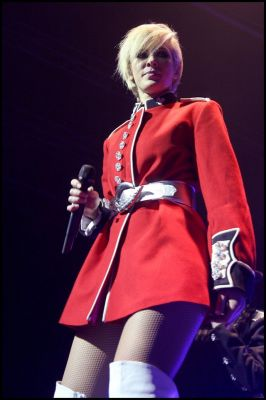
Lorie performing in 2008

- 2001: Près de toi
- 2002: Tendrement
- 2004: Attitudes
- 2005: Rester la même
- 2007: 2lor en moi ?
- 2011: Regarde-moi
- 2012: Danse
- 2017: Les choses de la vie
- 2024: Hyper Lorie

=== DVDs ===
- Je serai (ta meilleure amie)
- Près de Vous
- Tendrement Vôtre
- Live Tour
- Week End Tour
- Best Of
- Live Tour 2006

=== Featured on ===
- 2002: "Tous dans le même bateau", with Les Enfoirés
- 2003: "La Foire aux Enfoirés", with Les Enfoirés
- 2003: Pluri Elles, a Serge Lama album, on the song "Les poètes"
- 2004: "Le cœur des femmes", with Combat Combo
- 2004: "Les Enfoirés dans l'espace", with Les Enfoirés
- 2005: "Le Train des Enfoirés", with Les Enfoirés
- 2005: "Et puis la terre", with A.S.I.E
- 2006: "Le Village des Enfoirés", with Les Enfoirés
- 2007: "La Caravane des Enfoirés", with Les Enfoirés
- 2007: "Lonely", with 2A.M
- 2008: "Les Secrets des Enfoirés", with Les Enfoirés
- 2009: "Les Enfoirés font leur cinéma", with Les Enfoirés
- 2010: "Les Enfoirés... la Crise de Nerfs", with Les Enfoirés
- 2011: "Dans l'oeil des Enfoirés", with Les Enfoirés

== Filmography ==
Year	Title	Role	Director	Notes
2002	Stuart Little 2	Margalo	Rob Minkoff	French voice
2004	The Incredibles	Violet Parr	Brad Bird	French voice
2008	De feu et de glace	Alexia Moreno	Joyce Buñuel	TV movie
2008	The Young and the Restless	Juliette	Dean LaMont & Michael Stich	TV series (1 episode)
2008	Tinker Bell	Tinker Bell	Bradley Raymond	French voice
2009	Tinker Bell and the Lost Treasure	Tinker Bell	Klay Hall	French voice
2010	Un mari de trop	Stéphanie	Louis Choquette	TV movie
2010	Tinker Bell and the Great Fairy Rescue	Tinker Bell	Bradley Raymond	French voice
2012	Secret of the Wings	Tinker Bell	Peggy Holmes	French voice
2013	Joséphine, ange gardien	Claire	Pascal Heylbroeck	TV series (1 episode)
2013	Link 2	Lorie	Daniel Bésikian & Franck Guedj	Short
2013	Zak	herself		TV series (2 episodes)
2014	Gates of the Sun: Algeria Forever	Sanya	Jean-Marc Minéo	
2014	The Pirate Fairy	Tinker Bell	Peggy Holmes	French voice
2015	Dragon Blade	The Parthian Queen	Daniel Lee	
2015	Chienne de Vie	Lise	Cyril Ferment	Short
2015	Tinker Bell and the Legend of the NeverBeast	Tinker Bell	Steve Loter	French voice
2017	Murders at Grasse	Sophie Mournel	Karim Ouaret	TV movie
2017–2019	Tomorrow Is Ours	Lucie Salducci	Frédéric Chansel, Laure de Colbert, ...	TV series (485 episodes)
2022	Les Mystères de la duchesse	Maud	Emmanuelle Dubergey	TV movie

== Theatre ==
Year	Title	Author	Director
2015–16	Pygmalion	George Bernard Shaw	Ned Grujic

== Tours ==
- 2002–2003: Lorie Live Tour
- 2004: Week End Tour 2004
- 2006: Live Tour 2006
- 2008: Le Tour 2LOR
- 2019–2020: Des Choses à se dire
- 2025–2026: Lorie Party

== Awards ==
- 2003: Rolf-Marbot Price for her song "J'ai besoin d'amour".
- 2003: World Music Award for "Best French Female Pop/Rock Artist".
- 2003: Inauguration of the Lorie statue in the Musée Grévin, the French wax museum.
