= Calogero discography =

- Studio albums: 10
- Live albums: 3
- Compilation albums: 2
- Singles: 17
- Music videos: 1
- Tours: 1

This article presents the discography of the French pop rock singer Calogero.

== Albums ==
=== Studio albums ===
Title	Release date	Peak chart positions					Sales	Certifications
Title	Release date	FRA	FRA Dig.	BEL (FL)	BEL (WA)	SWI	Sales	Certifications
Au milieu des autres	May 2000	56	—	—	40	—		
Calogero	February 2002	3	—	—	2	26	FRA: 1,000,000	BEA: Gold; SNEP: Diamond
3 / Calog3ro	March 2004	1	—	—	1	14	FRA: 1,000,000	BEA: 2× Platinum; IFPI SWI: Platinum; SNEP: Diamond
Pomme C	March 2007	2	1	—	1	16	FRA: 200,000	BEA: Platinum=; IFPI SWI: Gold; SNEP: Platinum
L'Embellie	April 2009	1	1	—	1	9	FRA: 300,000	BEA: Platinum; SNEP: 3× Platinum
Les feux d'artifice	August 2014	1	—	53	1	6	FRA: 725,000	BEA: Gold; SNEP: Diamond
Liberté Chérie	August 2017	1	—	51	1	8	FRA: 125,700	BEA: Gold; SNEP: Diamond
Centre ville	December 2020	1	—	—	1	8		SNEP: Platinum
A.M.O.U.R	September 2023	1	—	118	1	8		
X	October 2024	4	—	—	3	28		

=== Live albums ===
Title	Release date	Peak charts positions				Sales	Certifications
Title	Release date	FRA	FRA Dig.	BEL (WA)	SWI	Sales	Certifications
Live 1.0	August 2005	1	1	1	14	FRA: 100,000	BEA: Gold; SNEP: Gold
En Concert	December 2011	45	—	—	—		
Live 2015	December 2015	—	—	12	72		

=== Compilation albums ===
Title	Release date	Peak charts positions			Certifications
Title	Release date	FRA	BEL (WA)	SWI	Certifications
Best Of – Version Originale/Version Symphonique	November 2010	4	1	71	SNEP: Platinum
Best Of	November 2019	20	11	—	SNEP: Platinum

== Singles ==
Year	Title	Peak chart positions				Album
Year	Title	FRA	FR (DD)	BEL (WA)	SWI	Album
1999	"Prendre l'air"	96	—	—	—	Au Milieu des autres
2000	"De Cendres et de Terre"	57	—	—	—	Au Milieu des autres
2000	"Devant toi"	—	—	—	—	Au Milieu des autres
2002	"Aussi libre que moi"	35	—	17	—	Calogero
2002	"En apesanteur"	13	—	15	—	Calogero
2003	"Tien An Men"	43	—	—	69	Calogero
2003	"Prendre racine"	39	—	—	—	Calogero
2004	"Face à la mer" (duet with Passi)	3	—	2	12	3
2004	"Si seulement je pouvais lui manquer"	7	—	6	25	3
2007	"Le Saut de l'ange"	—	—	16	—	Pomme C
2007	"Pomme C"	—	10	22	—	Pomme C
2008	"Danser encore"	113	—	37	—	Pomme C
2008	"La débâcle des sentiments" (duet with Stanislas)	2	11	3	68	—
2009	"C'est dit"	—	10	1	78	L'Embellie
2014	"Un jour au mauvais endroit"	4	—	6	74	Les feux d'artifice
2014	"Les feux d'artifice"	101	—	35	—	Les feux d'artifice
2014	"L'éclipse"	34	—	11	—	Les feux d'artifice
2014	"Le portrait"	10	—	5	—	Les feux d'artifice
2017	"Je joue de la musique"	2	—	7	66	Liberté Chérie
2017	"On se sait par cœur"	49	—	—	—	Liberté Chérie
2017	"Fondamental"	21	—	21	—	Liberté Chérie
2018	"Voler de nuit"	183	—	14	—	Liberté Chérie
2018	"1987"	49	—	21	—	Liberté Chérie
2019	"On se sait par cœur"	—	—	27	—	—
2020	"On fait comme si"	91	—	43	—	Centre Ville
2020	"La rumeur"	—	—	18	—	Centre Ville
2020	"Celui d'en bas"	—	—	36	—	Centre Ville
2023	"Donne"	—	—	22	—	Non-album single

Promotional singles

Year	Title	Peak chart positions	Album
Year	Title	FRA	Album
2003	"Yalla"	113	3
2005	"Safe Sex"	—	Live 1.0
2005	"Devant toi"	—	Live 1.0
2005	"Un Jour parfait"	—	Live 1.0
2015	"Avant toi"	128	
2015	"J'ai le droit aussi"	158	

== DVD ==
Title	Release data	Sales certified	Certification (France)	Peak position		
Title	Release data	Sales certified	Certification (France)	FR	BE (WA)	SWI
Live 1.0	November 2005	100,000	Diamond (2006)	2	?	—

== Tours ==
- Live 1.0
