= List of number-one hits of 2008 (France) =

This is a list of the French SNEP Top 100 Singles, Top 50 Digital Singles, Top 200 Albums and Top 50 Digital Albums number-ones of 2008.

== Number-ones by week ==
=== Singles chart ===
Week	Issue date	Physical singles		Digital singles	
Week	Issue date	Artist	Title	Artist	Title
1	5 January	Fatal Bazooka featuring Yelle	"Parle à ma main"	Yael Naim	"New Soul"
2	12 January	Fatal Bazooka featuring Yelle	"Parle à ma main"	Yael Naim	"New Soul"
3	19 January	Fatal Bazooka featuring Yelle	"Parle à ma main"	Yael Naim	"New Soul"
4	26 January	Sheryfa Luna	"Il avait les mots"	Yael Naim	"New Soul"
5	2 February	Sheryfa Luna	"Il avait les mots"	Yael Naim	"New Soul"
6	9 February	Sheryfa Luna	"Il avait les mots"	Yael Naim	"New Soul"
7	16 February	Sheryfa Luna	"Il avait les mots"	Yael Naim	"New Soul"
8	23 February	Sheryfa Luna	"Il avait les mots"	Yael Naim	"New Soul"
9	1 March	Sheryfa Luna	"Il avait les mots"	Yael Naim	"New Soul"
10	8 March	Sheryfa Luna	"Il avait les mots"	Yael Naim	"New Soul"
11	15 March	Sheryfa Luna	"Il avait les mots"	Yael Naim	"New Soul"
12	22 March	Leona Lewis	"Bleeding Love"	Jeff Buckley	"Hallelujah"
13	29 March	M. Pokora	"Dangerous"	Madonna featuring Justin Timberlake	"4 Minutes"
14	5 April	Laurent Wolf	"No Stress"	Duffy	"Mercy"
15	12 April	Ch'ti DJ	"Hé, biloute ! Monte l'son ! Hein !"	Duffy	"Mercy"
16	19 April	Enrique Iglesias & Nâdiya	"Tired of Being Sorry"	Madonna featuring Justin Timberlake	"4 Minutes"
17	26 April	Enrique Iglesias & Nâdiya	"Tired of Being Sorry"	Madonna featuring Justin Timberlake	"4 Minutes"
18	3 May	Enrique Iglesias & Nâdiya	"Tired of Being Sorry"	Madonna featuring Justin Timberlake	"4 Minutes"
19	10 May	Enrique Iglesias & Nâdiya	"Tired of Being Sorry"	Madonna featuring Justin Timberlake	"4 Minutes"
20	17 May	Enrique Iglesias & Nâdiya	"Tired of Being Sorry"	Estelle & Kanye West	"American Boy"
21	24 May	Enrique Iglesias & Nâdiya	"Tired of Being Sorry"	Estelle & Kanye West	"American Boy"
22	31 May	Enrique Iglesias & Nâdiya	"Tired of Being Sorry"	Estelle & Kanye West	"American Boy"
23	7 June	Enrique Iglesias & Nâdiya	"Tired of Being Sorry"	Estelle & Kanye West	"American Boy"
24	14 June	Enrique Iglesias & Nâdiya	"Tired of Being Sorry"	Estelle & Kanye West	"American Boy"
25	21 June	Enrique Iglesias & Nâdiya	"Tired of Being Sorry"	Mylène Farmer	"Dégénération"
26	28 June	Enrique Iglesias & Nâdiya	"Tired of Being Sorry"	Estelle & Kanye West	"American Boy"
27	5 July	William Baldé	"Rayon de soleil"	Quentin Mosimann	"Cherchez le garçon"
28	12 July	William Baldé	"Rayon de soleil"	Estelle & Kanye West	"American Boy"
29	19 July	William Baldé	"Rayon de soleil"	Estelle & Kanye West	"American Boy"
30	26 July	William Baldé	"Rayon de soleil"	Estelle & Kanye West	"American Boy"
31	2 August	William Baldé	"Rayon de soleil"	Estelle & Kanye West	"American Boy"
32	9 August	William Baldé	"Rayon de soleil"	Madcon	"Beggin'"
33	16 August	William Baldé	"Rayon de soleil"	Katy Perry	"I Kissed a Girl"
34	23 August	Mylène Farmer	"Dégénération"	Madcon	"Beggin'"
35	30 August	William Baldé	"Rayon de soleil"	Madcon	"Beggin'"
36	6 September	William Baldé	"Rayon de soleil"	Madcon	"Beggin'"
37	13 September	Madcon	"Beggin'"	Madcon	"Beggin'"
38	20 September	Madcon	"Beggin'"	Madcon	"Beggin'"
39	27 September	Madcon	"Beggin'"	Grégoire	"Toi + Moi"
40	4 October	Madcon	"Beggin'"	Madcon	"Beggin'"
41	11 October	Madcon	"Beggin'"	Madcon	"Beggin'"
42	18 October	Madcon	"Beggin'"	Guru Josh Project	"Infinity 2008"
43	25 October	Madcon	"Beggin'"	Grégoire	"Toi + Moi"
44	1 November	Guru Josh Project	"Infinity 2008"	Grégoire	"Toi + Moi"
45	8 November	Mylène Farmer	"Appelle mon numéro"	Grégoire	"Toi + Moi"
46	15 November	Johnny Hallyday	"Ça n'finira jamais"	Grégoire	"Toi + Moi"
47	22 November	Johnny Hallyday	"Ça n'finira jamais"	Grégoire	"Toi + Moi"
48	29 November	Guru Josh Project	"Infinity 2008"	Britney Spears	"Womanizer"
49	6 December	Patrick Sébastien	"Ah... si tu pouvais fermer ta gueule..."	Britney Spears	"Womanizer"
50	13 December	Britney Spears	"Womanizer"	Britney Spears	"Womanizer"
51	20 December	Britney Spears	"Womanizer"	Britney Spears	"Womanizer"
52	27 December	Britney Spears	"Womanizer"	Jason Mraz	"I'm Yours"

=== Albums chart ===
Week	Issue date	Physical albums		Digital albums	
Week	Issue date	Artist	Title	Artist	Title
1	5 January	Radiohead	In Rainbows	Radiohead	In Rainbows
2	12 January	Radiohead	In Rainbows	The Dø	A Mouthful
3	19 January	The Dø	A Mouthful	Bernard Lavilliers	Samedi soir à Beyrouth
4	26 January	Bernard Lavilliers	Samedi soir à Beyrouth	Cat Power	Jukebox
5	2 February	Bernard Lavilliers	Samedi soir à Beyrouth	Jack Johnson	Sleep Through The Static
6	9 February	Cali	L'Espoir	Michael Jackson	Thriller 25
7	16 February	Michael Jackson	Thriller 25	Michael Jackson	Thriller 25
8	23 February	Michael Jackson	Thriller 25	Paris	Soundtrack
9	1 March	Michael Jackson	Thriller 25	Les Enfoirés	Le Secret des Enfoirés
10	8 March	Les Enfoirés	Le Secret des Enfoirés	Les Enfoirés	Le Secret des Enfoirés
11	15 March	Les Enfoirés	Le Secret des Enfoirés	Raphaël	Je sais que la Terre est plate
12	22 March	Raphaël	Je sais que la Terre est plate	Alain Bashung	Bleu pétrole
13	29 March	Alain Bashung	Bleu pétrole	Francis Cabrel	Des Roses et des Orties
14	5 April	Francis Cabrel	Des Roses et des Orties	Camille	Music Hole
15	12 April	Francis Cabrel	Des Roses et des Orties	Francis Cabrel	Des Roses et des Orties
16	19 April	Francis Cabrel	Des Roses et des Orties	Madonna	Hard Candy
17	26 April	Madonna	Hard Candy	Madonna	Hard Candy
18	3 May	Madonna	Hard Candy	Madonna	Hard Candy
19	10 May	Madonna	Hard Candy	Amy Winehouse	Frank
20	17 May	Sefyu	Suis-je le gardien de mon frère?	Maxime Le Forestier	Restons amants
21	24 May	Francis Cabrel	Des Roses et des Orties	Psy 4 de la Rime	Les Cités d'or
22	31 May	Psy 4 de la Rime	Les Cités d'or	Alanis Morissette	Flavors of Entanglement
23	7 June	Francis Cabrel	Des Roses et des Orties	N.E.R.D	Seeing Sounds
24	14 June	Francis Cabrel	Des Roses et des Orties	Coldplay	Viva la Vida or Death and All His Friends
25	21 June	Coldplay	Viva la Vida or Death and All His Friends	Coldplay	Viva la Vida or Death and All His Friends
26	28 June	Coldplay	Viva la Vida or Death and All His Friends	Coldplay	Viva la Vida or Death and All His Friends
27	5 July	Coldplay	Viva la Vida or Death and All His Friends	Coldplay	Viva la Vida or Death and All His Friends
28	12 July	Coldplay	Viva la Vida or Death and All His Friends	Coldplay	Viva la Vida or Death and All His Friends
29	19 July	Carla Bruni	Comme si de rien n'était	Carla Bruni	Comme si de rien n'était
30	26 July	Coldplay	Viva la Vida or Death and All His Friends	Coldplay	Viva la Vida or Death and All His Friends
31	2 August	Coldplay	Viva la Vida or Death and All His Friends	Coldplay	Viva la Vida or Death and All His Friends
32	9 August	Coldplay	Viva la Vida or Death and All His Friends	Coldplay	Viva la Vida or Death and All His Friends
33	16 August	Coldplay	Viva la Vida or Death and All His Friends	Coldplay	Viva la Vida or Death and All His Friends
34	23 August	Coldplay	Viva la Vida or Death and All His Friends	Mylène Farmer	Point de Suture
35	30 August	Mylène Farmer	Point de Suture	Mylène Farmer	Point de Suture
36	6 September	Tryo	Ce que l'on sème	Keziah Jones	Nigerian Wood
37	13 September	Metallica	Death Magnetic	Coldplay	Viva la Vida or Death and All His Friends
38	20 September	Julien Clerc	Où s'en vont les avions ?	Julien Clerc	Où s'en vont les avions ?
39	27 September	Julien Clerc	Où s'en vont les avions ?	Grégoire	Toi + Moi
40	4 October	Christophe Maé	Comme à la maison	Ayo	Gravity At Last
41	11 October	Ayo	Gravity At Last	Oasis	Dig Out Your Soul
42	18 October	Bénabar	Infréquentable	Bénabar	Infréquentable
43	25 October	Bénabar	Infréquentable	Bénabar	Infréquentable
44	1 November	Johnny Hallyday	Ça ne finira jamais	P!nk	Funhouse
45	8 November	Johnny Hallyday	Ça ne finira jamais	Vincent Delerm	Quinze Chansons
46	15 November	Christophe Maé	Comme à la maison	Enya	And Winter Came...
47	22 November	Seal	Soul	Seal	Soul
48	29 November	Seal	Soul	Seal	Soul
49	6 December	Alain Souchon	Écoutez d'où ma peine vient	Alain Souchon	Écoutez d'où ma peine vient
50	13 December	Seal	Soul	Seal	Soul
51	20 December	Seal	Soul	Seal	Soul
52	27 December	Seal	Soul	Seal	Soul

== See also ==
- 2008 in music
- List of number-one hits (France)
- List of artists who reached number one on the French Singles Chart
