= NRJ Music Awards 2009 =

Compilation album by Various Artists
- Released: 19 December 2008

NRJ Music Awards chronology
NRJ Music Awards 2008 (2008)	NRJ Music Awards 2009 (2008)	NRJ Music Awards 2010 (2010)

NRJ Music Awards 2009 is a 2008 compilation album by NRJ.

== Track listing ==
=== Disc 1 ===
1. "Womanizer" - Britney Spears — 3:45
2. "Hot n Cold" - Katy Perry — 3:42
3. "Lovers in Japan" - Coldplay — 6:53
4. "So What" - P!nk — 3:36
5. "Rain on Your Parade" - Duffy — 3:29
6. "C'est ma terre" - Christophe Maé — 3:51
7. "When I Grow Up" - The Pussycat Dolls — 4:07
8. "This Is The Life" - Amy Macdonald — 3:06
9. "Burnin' Up" - Jonas Brothers — 2:56
10. "Si tu n'étais plus là" - Sheryfa Luna — 3:30
11. "Gate 22" - Pascale Picard — 4:15
12. "Everytime We Touch" - David Guetta and Chris Willis with Steve Angello and Sebastian Ingrosso — 3:15
13. "FM Air" - Zazie — 3:32
14. "Sweet About Me" - Gabriella Cilmi — 3:24
15. "I Don't Care" - Fall Out Boy — 3:40
16. "Kif'n'dir" - Zaho — 3:54
17. "Forgive Me" - Leona Lewis — 3:26
18. "One.2.3.Four" - Martin Solveig featuring Chakib Chambi — 4:02
19. "Si tu savais" - Shy'm — 3:23
20. "Il y a je t'aime et je t'aime" - Quentin Mosimann — 3:44
21. "Disturbia" - Rihanna — 3:59

=== Disc 2 ===
1. "Right Now (Na Na Na)" - Akon — 4:02
2. "La débâcle des sentiments" - Stanislas and Calogero — 5:19
3. "Right Here (Departed)" - Brandy — 3:41
4. "Love Lockdown - Kanye West — 4:33
5. "Keeps Gettin' Better" - Christina Aguilera — 3:04
6. "Dancin' Til Dawn" - Lenny Kravitz — 5:12
7. "Toi + Moi" - Grégoire — 3:02
8. "Infinity 2008" - Guru Josh Project — 3:14
9. "Triste novembre" - Marc Antoine — 3:33
10. "Just Dance" - Lady Gaga featuring Colby O'Donis — 4:04
11. "Génération virtuelle" - Olivier Miller — 3:16
12. "Entre toi et moi" - Mathieu Edward — 3:13
13. "In the End" - Kat DeLuna — 3:24
14. "Miss Blue" - Vincent — 3:24
15. "Call Me Baby (If You Don't Know My Name)" - David Tavaré featuring Ruth — 3:48
16. "L'Accord" - Christopher Stills and Sofia Essaïdi — 3:56
17. "Rayon de soleil" - William Baldé — 3:38
18. "Win or Lose (Appena prima di partire)" - Zero Assoluto featuring Nelly Furtado — 4:12
19. "American Boy" (no rap version) - Estelle featuring Kanye West — 4:05
20. "Libertà" - Pep's — 3:26
21. "Beggin'" - Madcon — 3:35

=== DVD (Music videos) ===
1. "Womanizer" - Britney Spears
2. "Lovers in Japan" - Coldplay
3. "When I Grow Up" - The Pussycat Dolls
4. "So What" - P!nk
5. "Right Now (Na Na Na)" - Akon
6. "Rain on Your Parade" - Duffy
7. "Disturbia" - Rihanna
8. "This Is The Life" - Amy Macdonald — 3:06
9. "La débâcle des sentiments" - Stanislas and Calogero
10. "Right Here (Departed)" - Brandy
11. "Toi + Moi" - Grégoire
12. "Keeps Gettin' Better" - Christina Aguilera
13. "Si tu n'étais plus là" - Sheryfa Luna
14. "FM Air" - Zazie — 3:32
15. "Just Dance" - Lady Gaga featuring Colby O'Donis
16. "Rayon de soleil" - William Baldé
17. "Gate 22" - Pascale Picard
18. "Génération virtuelle" - Olivier Miller
19. "Everytime We Touch" - David Guetta and Chris Willis with Steve Angello and Sebastian Ingrosso
20. "L'Accord" - Christopher Stills and Sofia Essaïdi
21. "Beggin'" - Madcon

Source : Amazon.

== Charts and sales ==
=== Weekly charts ===
Chart (2008/09)	Peak position
Belgian Compilations Chart (Wallonia)	1
French SNEP Compilations Chart	1
French Digital Albums Chart	14
Swiss Albums Chart	1

=== Year-end charts ===
End of year chart (2009)	Position
Belgian (Wallonia) Compilations Chart	1
Swiss Albums Chart	11

=== Certifications ===
Country	Certification	Date	Sales certified
Belgium	Gold	13 February 2009	15,000
France	Platinum	10 March 2009	200,000

== Release history ==
Region	Date	Format
France, Belgium, Switzerland	19 December 2008	Collector edition
France, Belgium, Switzerland	29 December 2008	Digital download
France, Belgium, Switzerland	5 January 2009	CD album
