= Ayo Joy =

- Directed by: Raphaël Duroy
- Produced by: MK2
- Starring: Ayọ
- Release date: 2009
- Running time: 90 minutes
- Country: France
- Language: French

Ayo Joy is a 2009 French documentary film produced by the French company MK2 and directed by Raphaël Duroy about the German-Nigerian singer Ayọ (Joy Olasunmibo Ogunmakin). The film came into the cinemas at the end of 2009, and details Ayọ's life and the search for her roots during the preparations and execution of her first concert in Nigeria, the birth country of her father. The documentary was sponsored by Clairefontaine.

== Background ==
The project was announced at the Cannes market in May 2009. The film accompanied Ayọ on a journey back to Nigeria, connecting her personal biography with her first performance on Nigerian soil. Born the fourth child of a Yoruba Nigerian father and a German-Sinti mother in Frechen near Cologne, Ayọ's stage name derives from the Yoruba language translation of her given name, Joy.

== Subject ==
Ayọ released her debut album Joyful in 2006, produced by Jay Newland — known for his work with Norah Jones — which reached Double-Platinum status in France, Platinum in Germany and Poland, and Gold status in Switzerland, Italy, and Greece. The album won the European Border Breakers Award (EBBA) in 2008. On 4 February 2009, Ayọ was named a patron of UNICEF France by then-president Jacques Hintzy to promote the right to education for children worldwide. Ayo Joy was produced during this period, following the release of her live album Live at the Olympia (2007) and studio album Gravity at Last (2008).
