= Calogero (disambiguation) =

Calogero is a name of Italian origin. See the linked article for a list of persons with this name.

Calogero may also refer to:

- Calogero (singer) (born 1971), French singer songwriter
- Calogero (album), 2002 album of the French Italian singer songwriter Calogero
- San Calogero, comune (municipality) in the Province of Vibo Valentia in the Italian region Calabria
