= Ça n'finira jamais =

Single by Johnny Hallyday

from the album Ça n'finira jamais
- Language: French
- English title: It will never end
- B-side: "Croire en l'homme"
- Released: November 2008
- Recorded: France, 2008
- Genre: Pop
- Length: 3:32
- Label: Warner Music France
- Songwriter(s): Patrice Guirao; Gioacchino Maurici; Calogero
- Producer(s): Philippe Uminski

Johnny Hallyday singles chronology
"Always" (2008)	"Ça n'finira jamais" (2008)	"Si mon cœur" (2008)

Music video
- "Ça n'finira jamais" on YouTube

"Ça n'finira jamais" ("It will never end") is a 2008 song recorded by French artist Johnny Hallyday. It was the first single from his album of the same name on which it features as first track. Written by Patrice Guirao, who has previously worked for many notable artists (Emmanuel Moire, Chimène Badi, Florent Pagny, Magalie Vaé...), and composed by French pop singers Calogero and his brother Gioacchino, a former member of Les Charts, "Ça n'finira jamais" was released in mid-November 2008 and the B-side of the single is a new song, "Croire en l'homme", written by Kevin Roentgen from the band Orson, Oliver Leiber, and Pierre Yves Lebert, which is also included on the special edition album cd. The single went straight to number-one on the French SNEP Singles Chart, selling 13,893 units that week, thus becoming Hallyday's fifth and final number-one hit throughout his 48-year career.

== Track listings ==
CD single

1. "Ça n'finira jamais"
2. "Croire en l'homme"

CD single - Collector edition

1. "Ça n'finira jamais"
2. "Croire en l'homme"
3. "Ça n'finira jamais" (video)

== Charts ==
Chart (2008)	Peak position
Belgian (Wallonia) Singles Chart	12
Eurochart Hot 100	9
French SNEP Singles Chart	1

End of year chart (2008)	Position
French Singles Chart	30
End of year chart (2009)	Position
Eurochart Hot 100	66
