= L'Équilibre instable =

Studio album by Stanislas
- Released: 19 November 2008
- Recorded: 2007
- Genre: Pop
- Label: Polydor

Stanislas chronology
L'Équilibre instable (2008)	Les Carnets de la vigie (2010)

Singles from L'Équilibre instable
- 1. "Le Manège" Released: February 2008; 2. "La Belle de Mai" Released: September 2008; 3. "La débâcle des sentiments" Released: January 2009

L'Équilibre instable (French pronunciation: [lekilibʁ ɛ̃stabl], lit. 'The Unstable Balance') is the first album recorded by French singer Stanislas, released on 19 November 2007. It had some success in francophone countries. Three singles from this album were top twenty hits in France.

== Background and release ==
After having composed for several artists such as Kool Shen, Calogero, Charles Aznavour and Céline Dion and being a conductor, Stanislas decided to compose for himself. His first album, L'Équilibre instable, was written by Amaury Salmon, Elodie Hesmes and Frédéric Doll. Stanislas participated in the writing of two songs and the composition of all tracks.

The album was released under several formats : first as a CD, then in a second edition with additional two tracks, including a duet with Calogero, then in a limited edition including the music videos of the singles on a DVD. The album provided three successful singles, particularly in France : "Le Manège" (#2 in France, No. 15 in Belgium), "La Belle de Mai" (#19 in France) and "La débâcle des sentiments" (#2 in France, No. 3 in Belgium and No. 68 in Switzerland).

== Critical reception ==
The album was generally well received by critics. MCM stated : [With this album, Stanislas] opens the doors of his world full of poetry and charm, offering compositions that could easily illustrate Christmas tales and fantasy epics". Stanislas found his inspiration from other singers or groups including U2, Coldplay, Pink Floyd or Serge Gainsbourg. His musical universe is composed of tributes to Slavic composers (Sergei Rachmaninov, Tchaikovski) and references of the new wave of the 1980s. This album mixes classical influences of the singer and light pop melodies.

The album achieved success in France and Belgium (Wallonia) where it remained in the charts for almost two years. It reached number ten in France in its tenth week in the chart, on 26 January 2008, and number eight in Belgium in its third week, on 9 February 2008.

== Track listings ==
First edition

1. "Le Manège" Amaury Salmon / Stanislas – 4:57
2. "La Belle de Mai" Patrice Guirao / Stanislas – 4:16
3. "Les lignes de ma main" Élodie Hesmes / Stanislas – 2:12
4. "La débâcle des sentiments" Amaury Salmon / Stanislas – 5:16
5. "Entre deux femmes" Julie D'Aimé / Stanislas – 3:52
6. "Ana quand bien même" Amaury Salmon / Stanislas – 3:32
7. "Nouveau big bang" Élodie Hesmes / Stanislas – 3:18
8. "L'absinthe pour l'absent" Élodie Hesmes / Stanislas – 3:10
9. "Le temps des roses" Élodie Hesmes / Stanislas – 4:49
10. "L'âge bête" Stanislas / Stanislas – 4:20
11. "À d'autres" Frédéric Doll / Stanislas – 5:02
12. "Mémoire morte" Amaury Salmon / Stanislas – 4:11
13. "L'hiver" Stanislas / Stanislas – 7:01

Second edition

+ Bonus

1. "La débâcle des sentiments" (by Stanislas and Calogero) – 4:10
2. "L'équilibre instable" – 4:38

Limited edition

+ DVD

1. "La débâcle des sentiments" (music video)
2. "La Belle de Mai" (music video)
3. "Le Manège" (music video)

== Charts and sales ==
=== Weekly charts ===
Chart (2007/09)	Peak position
Belgian (Wallonia) Albums Chart	8
French SNEP Albums Chart	10
French SNEP Digital Chart	15

=== Year-end charts ===
Chart (2008)	Position
Belgian (Wallonia) Albums Chart	11
French Albums Chart	33
Chart (2009)	Position
Belgian (Wallonia) Albums Chart	95

=== Certifications ===
Certifications for L'Équilibre instable
Region	Certification	Certified units/sales
Belgium (BRMA)	Platinum	30,000^{*}
^{*} Sales figures based on certification alone.

== Release history ==
Date	Label	Region	Format	Catalog
19 November 2007	Polydor	Belgium, France	CD	0600753035429
17 March 2008	Universal	Belgium, France	CD	0600753066447
10 October 2008	Polydor	Belgium, France	CD	0600753124772
24 November 2008	Polydor	Belgium, France	CD + DVD – Limited edition	0600753127605
