= Royal (Ayo album) =

Studio album by Ayọ
- Released: 31 January 2020
- Recorded: 2019
- Studio: Ferber (Paris)
- Length: 51:06
- Label: 3ème Bureau; Wagram
- Producer: Freddy Koella

Ayọ chronology
Ayọ (2017)	Royal (2020)

Singles from Royal
- 1. "Beautiful" Released: 15 October 2019; 2. "Rest Assured" Released: 17 January 2020

Royal is the sixth studio album by German singer and songwriter Ayọ, released on 31 January 2020 by 3ème Bureau and Wagram Music.

The first single from the album, "Beautiful", which was composed by the singer was released in October 2019. The second single "Rest Assured" was released in January 2020. For both singles a music video was released.

Ayọ originally planned to fill the album mainly with cover versions of her own songs from her debut album Joyful but shortly before the production started she decided against it and to record new songs. However, some cover versions of songs she especially loves from other artists are included, like "Né Quelque Part" from Maxime le Forestier (the only song on the album Ayọ sings in French), "Throw It Away" from jazz singer Abbey Lincoln, "Afro Blue" composed by Mongo Santamaría and made famous by John Coltrane and Lhasa's song "Fool’s Gold".

While on previous albums Ayọ nearly always played the guitar herself, she decided to concentrate on this album on her voice as instrument and therefore she plays the guitar only on the track "Fix Me Up".

The album was produced by Freddy Koella (guitarist of Bob Dylan and Willy DeVille) who also plays the guitar. Besides Koella, her band included Gaël Rakotondrabe (piano), Laurent Vernerey (contrabass) and Denis Benarrosh (percussion).

== Track listing ==
1. "Rest Assured" – 4:25
2. "Beautiful" – 4:07
3. "Fool's Gold" – 3:17
4. "Ne Quelque Part" – 4:14
5. "Rosie Blue" – 4:14
6. "Throw It Away" – 5:11
7. "Fix Me Up" – 4:51
8. "Afro Blue" – 2:57
9. "I'm in Love" – 3:43
10. "Ocean" – 4:45
11. "Just Like I Can't" – 4:20
12. "Royal" – 5:02

== Charts ==
Chart performance for Royal
Chart (2020)	Peak position
Belgian Albums (Ultratop Wallonia)	89
French Albums (SNEP)	31
Swiss Albums (Schweizer Hitparade)	59
