= L'Embellie =

Studio album by Calogero
- Released: 20 April 2009
- Genre: Pop, Rock
- Length: 48:06
- Label: Universal Records; Mercury

Calogero chronology
Pomme C (2007)	L'Embellie (2009)

Singles from L'Embellie
- 1. "C'est dit" Released: April 2009

L'Embellie is the fifth studio album recorded by French singer Calogero, and was released on 20 April 2009.

== Background ==
The album was preceded by lead single "C'est dit," written by Jean-Jacques Goldman.

For this album, Calogero asked many French singers and songwriters to compose the lyrics, including Dominique A, Dick Annegarn, Kent, Grand Corps Malade, Pierre Lapointe, Marc Lavoine, Pierre Pelù and Jean-Jacques Goldman. Calogero himself has written for the first time in his solo career a song text for "Je me suis trompé". Alana Filippi, who wrote "En apesanteur" seven years earlier, and Gioacchino, the singer's brother, also participated in the composing of the album.

The album went straight to number one on the French and Belgian (Wallonia) Albums Charts.

== Track listing ==
#	Title	Length
1.	"La Fin de la fin du monde" (Dominique A)	3:50
2.	"C'est dit" (Jean-Jacques Goldman)	3:30
3.	"L'Ombre et la Lumière" (duet with Grand Corps Malade) (Grand Corps Malade / Alanna Filippi)	4:12
4.	"Je me suis trompé" (Calogero)	3:00
5.	"La Bourgeoisie des sensations" (Pierre Lapointe)	3:48
6.	"J'attends" (Dominique A)	5:28
7.	"Passage des cyclones" (Dominique A)	4:02
8.	"Nathan" (Marc Lavoine)	3:50
9.	"Tu es fait pour voler" (Dick Annegarn)	4:15
10.	"Tu n'as qu'à m'attraper" (Dick Annegarn)	3:12
11.	"Il conté" (Pierre Pelù / Gioacchino Maurici)	3:43
12.	"L'Embellie" (Kent)	5:16

== Charts and sales ==
=== Weekly charts ===
Chart (2009)	Peak position
Belgian (Wallonia) Albums Chart	1
French Digital Chart	1
French Albums Chart	1
Swiss Albums Chart	9

=== Year-end charts ===
Chart (2009)	Position
Belgian (Wallonia) Albums Chart	3
Chart (2010)	Position
Belgian (Wallonia) Albums Chart	36

=== Certifications ===
Country	Certification	Date	Sales certified
Belgium	Gold	1 May 2009	15,000
France	3 x Platinum	22 December 2009	300,000
