= Si seulement je pouvais lui manquer =

Single by Calogero

from the album 3
- B-side: "Les Électrochocs"
- Released: November 2004
- Recorded: 2004
- Genre: Pop rock
- Length: 3:20
- Label: Universal Records; Mercury Records
- Songwriters: Gioacchino Maurici; Calogero; Julie D'Aimé; Michel Jourdan
- Producers: Calogero; Philippe Uminski

Calogero singles chronology
"Face à la mer" (2004)	"Si seulement je pouvais lui manquer" (2004)	"Safe Sex" (2005)

"Si seulement je pouvais lui manquer" is the name of a 2004 song recorded by the French singer Calogero. It was the third single from Calogero's third studio album, 3, on which it features as fourth track, and his tenth single overall. It was Calogero's second most successful single throughout his career, achieving the top ten in Belgium (Wallonia) and France.

== Song information ==
Michel Jourdan and Julie D'Aimé (she had already worked for Patricia Kaas) wrote the text, while Calogero and his brother Gioacchino composed the music, as for the other tracks on the album. The song is a pop/ballad song in which the singer evokes the absence of his father and how he misses him. He expresses that he would be happy if his father had a relationship with him.

"Si seulement je pouvais lui manquer" was a part of many French compilations released in 2005, such as Hits For Teens, Les Plus Belles Voix 4, Hit Connection - Best of 2005, Hits Superstars 2005, Only Hits 2005 and Les Plus Belles Ballades. It was also available on the charity album Solidarité Asie, as fourth track.

The song was performed by the singer during his first concerts tour and was thus included on the live album Live 1.0 (ninth track, CD 1). For the moment, there are two cover versions of the song : first, in 2007, by Amel Bent, Francis Cabrel, Jean-Jacques Goldman and Raphaël for Les Enfoirés' album La Caravane des Enfoirés, on which it is the sixth track; then, in 2008, by Vox Angeli on their eponymous album (second track, 3:06).

== Chart performances and awards ==
In France, "Si seulement je pouvais lui manquer" entered the chart at number 95 on 7 November 2004, three days before its official release as it was sold in a few stores. It jumped to a peak of number seven, then dropped almost every week, remaining for three weeks in the top ten, 14 weeks in the top 50 and 22 weeks in the top 100 and was eventually 61st on the End of the Year Chart. It was not much aired on radio, ranking at number 65 on Annual Airplay Chart.

In Belgium (Wallonia), the single debuted at number 17 on 27 November 2004, then climbed to number six and stayed there for five consecutive weeks. Then it dropped first rather slowly, then more quickly and totaled 15 weeks on the chart (top 40). It was the 94th best-selling single of 2004 as the sales overlapped two years.

The single featured for 25 weeks on the Swiss Singles Chart, from 28 November 2004. It reached a peak of number 25 in the second week and stayed for nine weeks in the top 50.

In 2005, the song was awarded 'Original song of the year' at the Victoires de la Musique.

== Track listings ==
- CD maxi
1. "Si seulement je pouvais lui manquer" — 3:20
2. "Les Électrochocs (new song) — 4:18
3. "Si seulement je pouvais lui manquer" (2004 live) — 3:39
- CD single
1. "Si seulement je pouvais lui manquer" — 3:20
2. "Les Électrochocs (new song) — 4:18
- CD single - Promo
1. "Si seulement je pouvais lui manquer" — 3:20
- 12" single - Promo
1. "Si seulement je pouvais lui manquer" — 3:20
- Digital download
1. "Si seulement je pouvais lui manquer" — 3:20
2. "Si seulement je pouvais lui manquer" (2004 live) — 3:39

== Charts ==
=== Peak positions ===
Chart (2004)	Peak position
Belgian (Wallonia) Singles Chart	6
French SNEP Singles Chart	7
Swiss Singles Chart	25

=== End of year charts ===
End of year chart (2004)	Position
Belgian (Wallonia) Singles Chart	94
French Airplay Chart	65
French Singles Chart	61
French TV Music Videos Chart	101
