= The Charts =

The Charts may refer to:

- The Charts (American group), 1950s
- The Charts (French group), 1990s
- Record chart music ranking.
