= Pomme C =

Studio album by Calogero
- Released: 12 March 2007
- Recorded: Italy
- Genre: Pop, rock
- Length: 49:35
- Label: Universal Records; Mercury

Calogero chronology
Live 1.0 (2005)	Pomme C (2007)	L'Embellie (2009)

Singles from Pomme C
- 1. "Le Saut de l'ange" Released: March 2007; 2. "Pomme C" Released: July 2007; 3. "Danser encore" Released: February 2008

Pomme C is the fourth studio album recorded by the French singer and songwriter Calogero. It was released on 12 March 2007 and achieved great success.

All lyrics were written by Zazie, who has already worked with Calogero on previous albums. The music was composed by Calogero, but he was helped by his brother Gioacchino for "Pomme C". The album was recorded in Italy, in Pergolato (Tuscany), in a house. Parts of the recording were also made in Belgium and France.

For him, this album is not that of the maturity nor the continuity of the previous album, 3 : it marked the beginning of a new musical style. The album was released in a simple and a collector editions on March 12, 2007, but also in a slidepack edition on February 27, 2008. The three singles released from this album were only available digitally in France, and as CD singles in Belgium (Wallonia).

== Track listing ==
All writing by Zazie, all music by Calogero except where noted.

#	Title	Length
1.	"Pomme C" (Calogero - Gioacchino)	3:18
2.	"Le Saut de l'ange"	4:49
3.	"Game Over"	3:28
4.	"Suis-je assez clair"	4:01
5.	"Drôle d'animal"	3:03
6.	"Me dit-elle"	4:37
7.	"Sans l'amour"	5:28
8.	"Danser encore"	3:08
9.	"Mélodie en sous-sol"	4:40
10.	"Je sais"	4:50
11.	"Hypocondriaque"	5:46
11^{1}.	"6 milliards de personnes"	2:36

^{1} Hidden track

+ Bonus :

1. "Le Saut de l'Ange" (video)

== Charts and sales ==
=== Weekly charts ===
Chart (2007–2008)	Peak position
Belgian (Wallonia) Albums Chart	1
French Digital Chart	1
French Albums Chart	2
Swiss Albums Chart	16

=== Year-end charts ===
Chart (2007)	Position
Belgian (Wallonia) Albums Chart	6
French Digital Chart	13
French Albums Chart	16
Chart (2008)	Position
Belgian (Wallonia) Albums Chart	47
French Albums Chart	86

=== Certifications ===
Certifications for Pomme C
Region	Certification	Certified units/sales
Belgium (BRMA)	Platinum	50,000^{*}
France (SNEP)	Platinum	200,000^{*}
Switzerland (IFPI Switzerland)	Gold	15,000^{^}
^{*} Sales figures based on certification alone.^{^} Shipments figures based on certification alone.
