= Le Manège =

Single by Stanislas

from the album L'Équilibre instable
- B-side: "À d'autres"
- Released: 25 February 2008
- Recorded: 2007
- Genre: Pop
- Length: 4:42
- Label: Polydor
- Songwriter(s): Amaury Salmon
- Producer(s): Stanislas

Stanislas singles chronology
"Le Manège" (2008)	"La Belle de Mai" (2008)

"Le Manège" (French pronunciation: [lə manɛʒ]) is a 2007 song recorded by French singer and composer Stanislas. It was the first single from his debut album L'Équilibre instable on which it appears as first track and was released on 25 February 2008. It was written by Amaury Salmon and composed by Stanislas. It was successful in France where it hit number two.

== Background and chart performances ==
Although the song was available digitally since November 2007 and aired on radio since September 2007, the song was only released as a CD single on 25 February 2008. "La débâcle des sentiments", a duet with Calogero, was also sent to radio stations on 24 October 2007, but "Le Manège" was eventually chosen as the first single. The song was notably performed twice on television : on the show Star Academy France and at the 2009 NRJ Music Awards.

In France, the single went straight to number two, on 1 March 2008, with 7,100 units sold. It remained for three consecutives weeks at this position, being unable to dislodge Sheryfa Luna's hit single "Il avait les mots", then dropped on the chart. It totalled 17 weeks in the top 50 and 27 weeks on the chart (top 100). In Belgium (Wallonia), the single entered the Ultratop 40 at No. 18 on 2 February thanks to the digital downloads, reached a peak of No. 15 the next week and remained for a total of 13 weeks in the top 40.

== Track listings ==
CD single

No.	Title	Length
1.	"Le Manège"	4:57
2.	"À d'autres"	5:02

Digital doawload

No.	Title	Length
1.	"Le Manège" (album version)	4:42
2.	"Le Manège" (single version)	4:57
3.	"Le Manège" (instrumental)	4:42

== Charts ==
=== Weekly charts ===
Chart (2008)	Peak position
Belgian (Wallonia) Singles Chart	15
Eurochart Hot 100	7
French SNEP Digital Chart	10
French SNEP Singles Chart	2

=== Year-end charts ===
End of year chart (2008)	Position
Belgian (Wallonia) Singles Chart	58
French Singles Chart	35
