= C'est dit =

Single by Calogero

from the album L'Embellie
- Released: 16 February 2009
- Recorded: 2008
- Genre: Pop
- Length: 3:30
- Label: Mercury, Universal Music
- Songwriter(s): Lyrics: Jean-Jacques Goldman; Music: Calogero
- Producer(s): Calogero, Philippe Uminski

Calogero singles chronology
"La débâcle des sentiments" (2008)	"C'est dit" (2009)	"L'Ombre et la Lumière" (2009)

"C'est dit" is a 2009 song recorded by French singer and composer Calogero. It was the first single off his fifth studio album L'Embellie and was released on 16 February 2009. It was successful in Belgium (Wallonia) and on French digital chart.

== Background and theme ==
"C'est dit" was written by Jean-Jacques Goldman, which marked the first collaboration between both artists. In various interviews, Calogero explained: "I wanted to work with him first because I think he is a great author. I love his lyrics more than his music. I found interesting to make him work on a music that has no refrain. He said to me that it was bizarre, my song. I told him: "Find the hook". He found two : "On est riche que de ses amis" and "C'est dit"." Calogero also said he wanted a "moving" text to express his feelings for his friends.

Calogero composed the music with more acoustic and stripped arrangements than on his previous albums, and used an acoustic guitar. The introduction played on the piano provides "strong melancholy emotions".

Lyrically, the song deals with friendship, an important theme for the singer. He said: "This is a song that says several things: despite what you may succeed in the life, the true wealth is not being alone is to be surrounded by two or three true friends. It is also a way to say that we haven't many friends". Casimir appears in the music video because the singer wanted to refer to what he loved in his childhood.

== Chart performance ==
In Belgium (Wallonia), "C'est dit" went to number 31 on the Ultratop 50 on 28 March 2009, climbed and eventually topped the chart six weeks later, remaining for eight weeks in the top ten. In Switzerland, the song briefly charted, spending three weeks at the bottom of the single chart. In France, it was much aired on radio, peaking at number seven on the SNEP airplay chart on 29 May 2009.

== Track listings ==
- CD single

No.	Title	Length
1.	"C'est dit" (radio edit)	3:27

- Digital download

No.	Title	Length
1.	"C'est dit" (album version)	3:30

== Charts ==
=== Weekly charts ===
Weekly chart performance for "C'est dit"
Chart (2009)	Peak position
Belgium (Ultratop 50 Wallonia)	1
France (Airplay Chart)	7
France (Digital Chart)	10
Switzerland (Schweizer Hitparade)	78

=== Year-end charts ===
Year-end chart performance for "C'est dit"
Chart (2009)	Position
Belgium (Ultratop 50 Wallonia)	22
France (Airplay Chart)	15
