= Gravity at Last =

Studio album by Ayọ
- Released: 26 September 2008
- Recorded: March 2008
- Studio: Compass Point (Nassau, Bahamas); The Carriage House (Stamford, Connecticut) (Note: Additional recording)
- Length: 47:32
- Label: Polydor
- Producer: Ayọ; Jay Newland

Ayọ chronology
Joyful (2006)	Gravity at Last (2008)	Billie-Eve (2011)

Professional ratings
Review scores
Source	Rating
AllMusic	3.5/5 stars

Gravity at Last is the second studio album by German singer and songwriter Ayọ, released on 26 September 2008 by Polydor Records. The album was recorded in March 2008 and, like her debut album, Joyful, within five days under live conditions. The recording in analog technology took place at Compass Point Studios in Nassau on the island of New Providence, Bahamas. The album topped the French chart in its second week on the run. On 5 February 2009, the album was certified platinum by the Syndicat National de l'Édition Phonographique (SNEP), denoting sales in excess of 200,000 copies in France.

The song "Slow Slow (Run Run)" was released for radio promotion on 30 June 2008 and was released as first single from the album. "Lonely" was released as the second single.

== Track listing ==
All tracks are written by Ayọ.

No.	Title	Length
1.	"I Am Not Afraid"	3:35
2.	"Maybe (Ayo Blues)"	3:29
3.	"Slow Slow (Run Run)"	3:29
4.	"Love and Hate"	3:45
5.	"Get Out of My Way"	2:47
6.	"Better Days"	3:33
7.	"Change"	3:11
8.	"Piece of Joy"	3:38
9.	"Lonely" (lasts 4:15 on non-French editions)	3:34
10.	"Sometimes"	3:37
11.	"What's This All About?"	3:22
12.	"Mother"	5:28
13.	"Thank You"	4:04

Non-French edition bonus track
No.	Title	Length
14.	"Sometimes" (Home Acoustic)	3:01

== Personnel ==
- Ayọ – vocals, acoustic guitar, backing vocals, electric guitar, piano, production
- Jawara Adams – trumpet
- Jean-Philippe Allard – executive production
- Sherrod "Licspiffy" Barnes – acoustic guitar, backing vocals, baritone guitar, electric guitar, guitar solo
- Osie Bowe – second engineer
- Larry Campbell – acoustic guitar, cittern, electric guitar, mandolin, National resonator guitar, pedal steel guitar, slide electric guitar, violin
- Keith Christopher – bass
- The Compass Point Horns – trumpet
- Dave Eggar – cello
- Don Harris – trumpet
- Jerry Lawson – vocals
- Andy Manganello – engineering
- Terry Manning – horn arrangements
- Ozzie Melendez – trombone
- Jay Newland – production, engineering, mixing
- Samanta Novella – artwork
- Jermaine Parrish – drums
- Lucky Peterson – backing vocals, clavinet, Hammond B3, piano, Wurlitzer electric piano
- Tino "Sheep" Richardson – tenor saxophone
- John Scarpulla – tenor saxophone
- Neil Symonette – percussion

== Charts ==
=== Weekly charts ===
Weekly chart performance for Gravity at Last
Chart (2008–2009)	Peak position
Australian Albums (ARIA)	94
Belgian Albums (Ultratop Wallonia)	18
European Albums (Billboard)	16
French Albums (SNEP)	1
German Albums (Offizielle Top 100)	55
Greek International Albums (IFPI)	3
Italian Albums (FIMI)	93
Polish Albums (ZPAV)	6
Swiss Albums (Schweizer Hitparade)	10

=== Year-end charts ===
Year-end chart performance for Gravity at Last
Chart (2008)	Position
French Albums (SNEP)	37
Greek International Albums (IFPI)	34
Swiss Albums (Schweizer Hitparade)	89

== Certifications ==
Certifications for Gravity at Last
Region	Certification	Certified units/sales
France (SNEP)	Platinum	200,000^{*}
Poland (ZPAV)	Platinum	20,000^{*}
^{*} Sales figures based on certification alone.

== Release history ==
Release history for Gravity at Last
Region	Date	Label	Ref.
Italy	26 September 2008	Universal	
France	29 September 2008	Polydor	
Australia	3 October 2008	Universal	
Poland	3 October 2008	Universal	
Germany	10 October 2008	Universal	
