= Ayo (singer) =

German singer (born 1980)

Ayọ
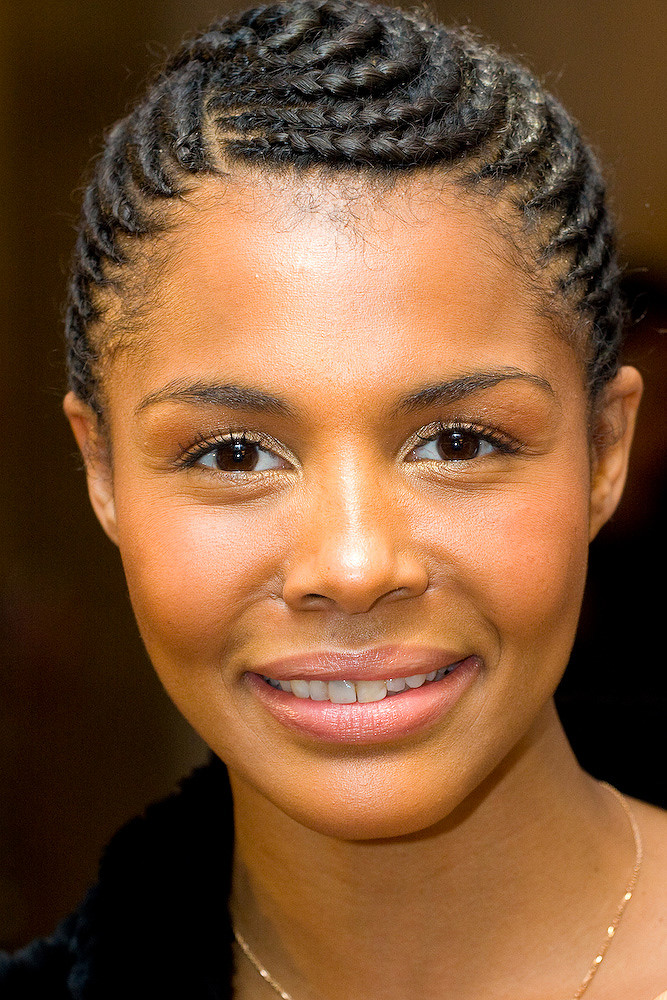
- Ayọ at the National Theatre in Warsaw, 19 November 2008

Background information
- Also known as: Ayọ, Ayo.
- Born: Joy Olasunmibo Ogunmakin; 14 September 1980 (age 45); Cologne, West Germany
- Genres: Folk; soul; reggae
- Occupations: Singer; songwriter; actress
- Instruments: Vocals; guitar; piano
- Years active: 2001–present
- Labels: Polydor; Interscope; Motown France; Ogun; 3ème Bureau; Wagram
- Website: www.ayomusic.com

Joy Olasunmibo Ogunmakin (born 14 September 1980), known professionally as Ayọ (also rendered Ayo.), is a German singer and actress. Her stage name derives from the Yoruba translation of her given name, Joy.

Her debut album Joyful, released in 2006, reached Double-Platinum status in France, Platinum in Germany and Poland, and Gold status in Switzerland, Italy, and Greece. Interscope Records released the album in the United States on 20 November 2007.

Born in Frechen near Cologne, Germany, she has a son named Nile, who was born in late 2005 and a daughter named Billie-Eve, born July 2010, with the German reggae singer Patrice, from whom she is now separated. At the end of 2007, she moved with her family to the Greenwich Village section of Manhattan in New York City. Currently, she lives in Tahiti, French Polynesia with her children.

Then-president of UNICEF France, Jacques Hintzy, announced on 4 February 2009 that the singer was named patron of UNICEF to promote the right to education for all children in the world.

The French production company MK2 produced the film Ayo Joy, a 90-minute documentary about the singer and her life, in 2009. The film was directed by Raphaël Duroy.

== Biography ==
=== Early years ===
Ayọ was born in 1980 near Cologne, then in West Germany, as the fourth child of a Nigerian father and a German-Sinti mother. She has one sister and two brothers. When she was about six years old, her mother became addicted to heroin and spent some time in jail. After her parents divorced, she and two of her siblings spent periods of time in care and with foster families. She spent four years in a children's home in Schwalmtal-Waldniel where she learned to play violin and piano and became in 1992 a member of its music band "La Taste". When she was fourteen she was considered old enough by the authorities to live again with her father.

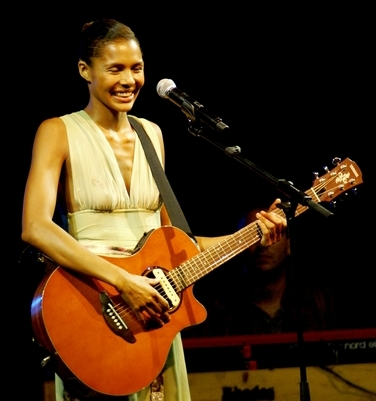
Monaco, 30 August 2007 (photo by Lionel Urman)

=== Musical career ===
At the age of six, Ayọ played the violin for a short time, then turned to the piano and later taught herself to play the guitar. While she was member of the band "La Taste" during her stay at the children's home in Waldniel she and eighteen other young band members recorded during summer 1992 the CD Kido Musik at the recording studio "Man Made Noise". During that time she also appeared for the first time in May 1993 in a music video, La Maladie d'Amour, and performed at a public concert.

When she was about 15, she wrote her first song, which was about her mother, and which helped her to cope with her traumatic childhood. Her musical taste was influenced by her father's large selection of vinyl albums which included Pink Floyd, Fela Kuti, Donny Hathaway, Jimmy Cliff and Bob Marley. When her father, who worked part-time as a DJ while studying engineering in Germany, discovered her singing talent he recorded a first demo tape with her in a studio and allowed her to drop out of school at the age of eighteen.

At twenty-one, Ayọ moved to London and later lived in Paris and New York City. During her time in Paris, her musical talent was noticed by a broader audience, and she gave her first solo concerts, opened 2002 for soul singers Omar and Cody Chesnutt, and signed a contract with Polydor Records.

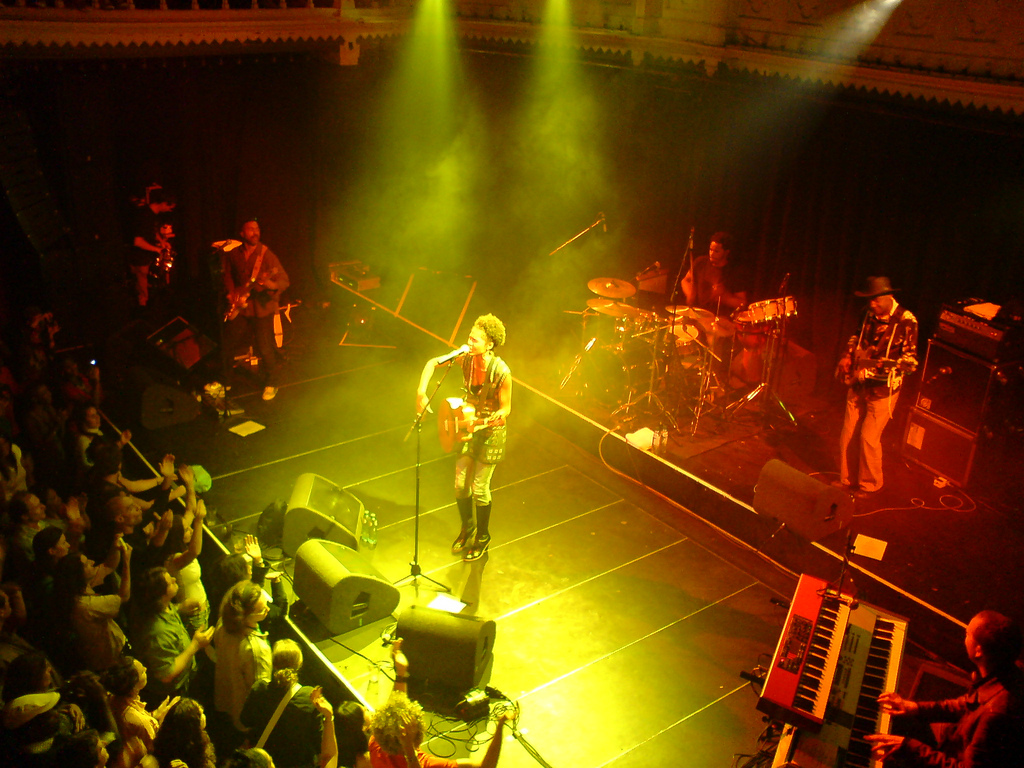
At the Paradiso (Amsterdam), 13. September 2007

Shortly after giving birth to her son Nile, she recorded her first album Joyful in January 2006 in the New York Sony studio. The whole disc was recorded in just five days under live conditions, with a group of musicians organized by her producer Jay Newland. The album was released in June 2006 in Europe and Korea, and in the United States and Japan in November 2007.

At the end of 2007, Ayọ started a concert tour through Germany and the United States. On her American tour she performed with Kenneth "Babyface" Edmonds. On 10 January 2008, she appeared on the Late Show with David Letterman, and on 26 January 2008, The Late Late Show with Craig Ferguson, performing her song Down on My Knees. In June 2008, the singer started her second tour through the United States and Canada.

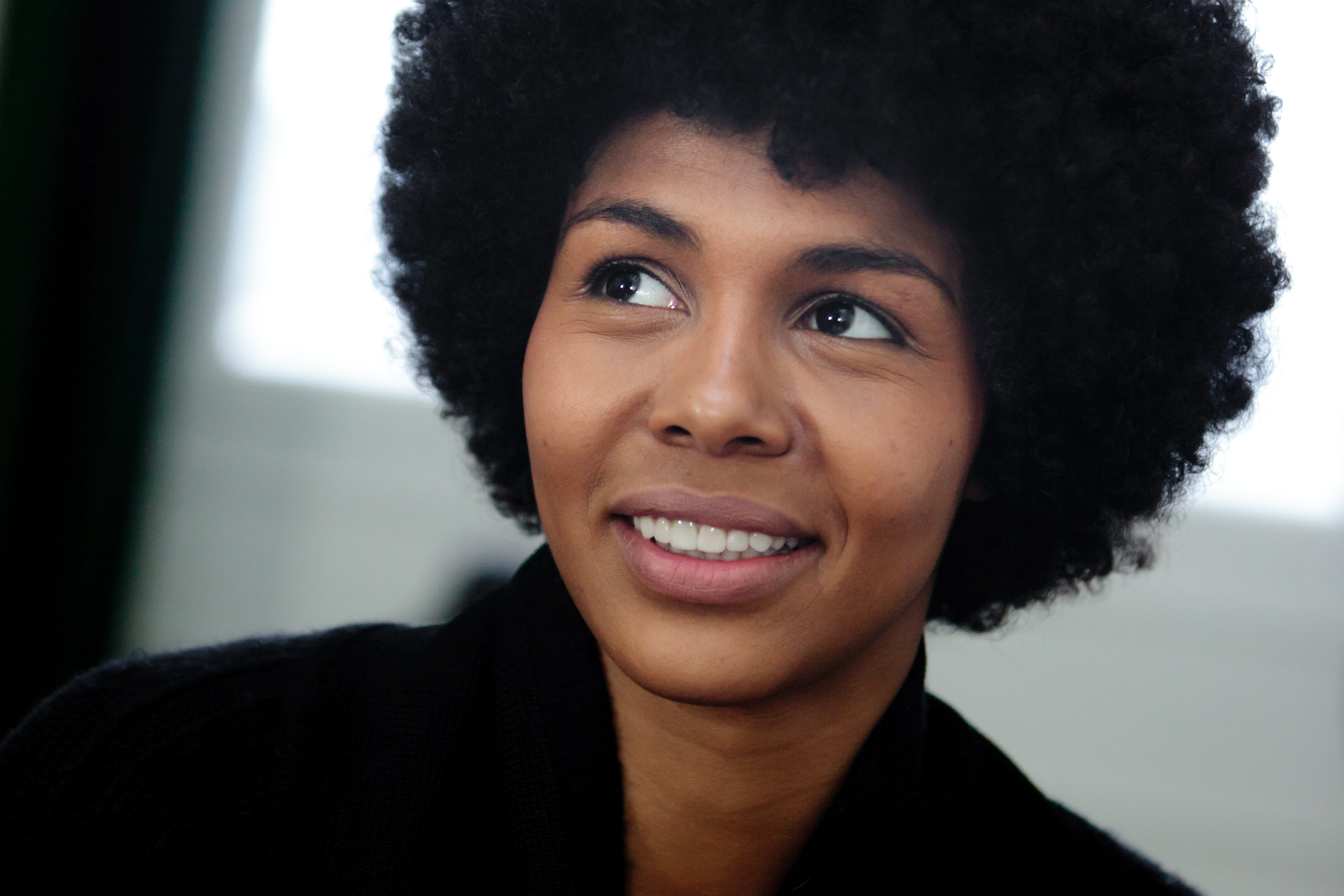
Ayọ 2011 (photo by Nicolas Esposit)

On 10 March 2008, Ayọ started recording on her second album Gravity at Last at the Compass Point Studios in Nassau on the Island of New Providence, The Bahamas. She is co-producing the album with Jay Newland. Her band includes Keith Christopherson (bass), Larry Campbell (guitars and other string instruments), Lucky Peterson (keyboards), Sherrod Barnes (guitar/vocals) and Jermaine Parrish (drums). The album with 13 tracks that were written and composed by the singer was recorded in only 5 days and was released at the end of September 2008 by Universal Music France. The album reached number 1 on the French album charts in October. On 21. In November 2008, Ayọ started her promotion tour for the album in Berlin which includes around 30 concerts in five European countries.

In 2008, Ayo won an EBBA Award for her album Joyful. Every year, the European Border Breakers Awards recognize the success of ten emerging artists or groups who reached audiences outside their own countries with their first internationally released album in the past year.

Ayọ's third album Billie-Eve, named after her daughter, was recorded in New York City with the cooperation of musicians like Craig Ross (guitarist of Lenny Kravitz), the rapper Saul Williams, Matthieu Chedid and Gail Ann Dorsey, bass player of David Bowie. The album is first released on 7 March 2011 in France and Ayọ starts a promotional tour through France and Poland on 21 March 2011. Ayọ signed with MBM Records in 2011 in the US. Billie-Eve was released in the United States on 20 March 2012. At the end of 2011, the singer moved within the Universal Group from the Polydor label to the labels Mercury France and Motown.

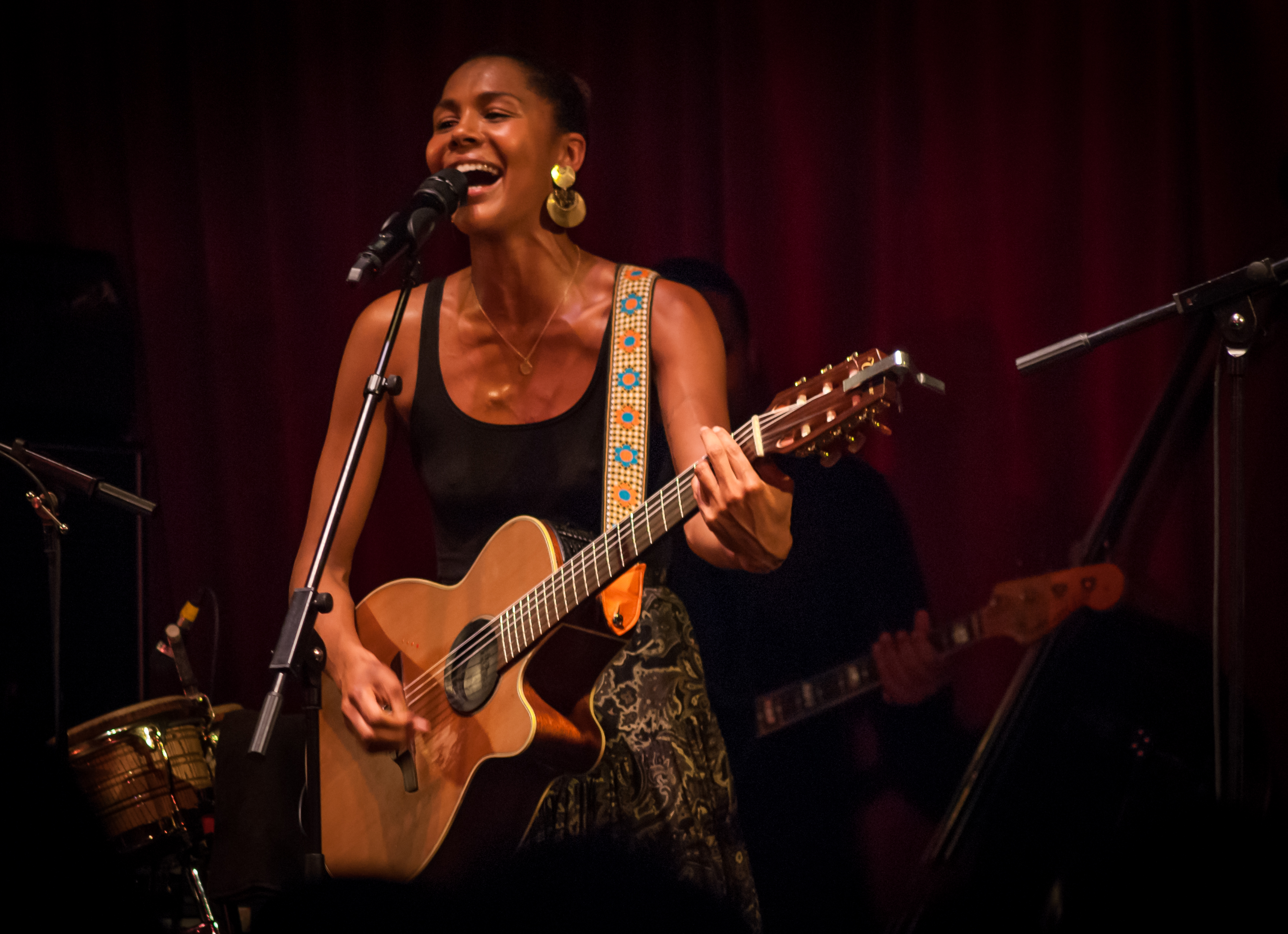
Ayọ during her 2014 tour at Bush Hall, London (photo by Aurélien Le Roch)

In 2013, Ayọ started to record her fourth album Ticket to the World, which was released on 7 October 2013, with the producer Jay Newland who produced also her first two albums. The first single from this album, Fire, has been released on 10 June 2013. A second version of the single featuring the French rapper Youssoupha was released in August 2013. After the album release, Ayọ tours from end of October 2013 for several months through Europe. Most concerts take place in France but she also performs in Luxembourg, Switzerland, Belgium, Poland, Germany, UK, and other countries.

Ayọ was asked by Arte to cover the classic song Sunny by Bobby Hebb as soundtrack for their 2013 Summer of Soul program. From 14 July to 18 August 2013, she presents every Sunday evening this program on the French TV broadcast. The soundtrack was released on 14 July 2013 in France on a special three CD edition by Fnac.

On 10 March 2014 at Le Lido, Ayọ won the category 'Best Female Singer' of the Globes de Cristal Award, which is bestowed by members of the French Press Association recognizing excellence in French art and culture. The other nominees in that category were Carla Bruni, HollySiz, Vanessa Paradis and Zaz.

In 2014, Ayọ organized in Paris undercover with an amateur choir a flash mob in the restaurant Rotonde de la Villette where she sang with the choir her song Who. The film about the action 'Mission Incognito: Ayo', directed by Lorenz Findeisen, was shown on the French-German TV network Arte in August 2014. Other episodes of this series featured the artists Rolando Villazón, Jim Avignon and Ulrich Matthes.

Ayọ was awarded the Grand Prize for SACEM repertoire abroad on 24 October 2014 at Olympia, Paris.

On 21 June 2015, Ayọ released a self-made music video on YouTube (renamed to Send This Message To All Your Friends on 22 June 2015) featuring the song Boom Boom, which she has written 10 months previously and so far only performed at live concerts, to react to the ongoing racial violence in the United States. She announced the release on her official social media accounts on Instagram, Facebook and Twitter.

In an interview in July 2015 Ayọ said that she has left the label Universal after ten years of cooperation because artists become objects in the music industry and she wants to be free.

In 2017, Ayọ released two singles, each accompanied by a music video, from her fifth album announced to be released in October that year. The first single, "I'm a Fool", was released in June and the second single "Paname" (a nickname for Paris and its suburbs) in September.

On 6 October 2017, the fifth album of the singer was released which was named Ayọ after herself.

On 15 October 2019, Ayọ released her single Beautiful under the Wagram Music/3ème Bureau label, a song from her sixth album Royal which was released on 31 January 2020. A second single with the track "Rest assured" was released earlier in January 2020.

=== Acting career ===
In April 2014, Ayọ's concert tour was interrupted for several weeks as she played the lead role in the movie Murder in Pacot (Meurtre à Pacot) by the award-winning Haitian filmmaker Raoul Peck, which was filmed in Port-au-Prince, Haiti, in April and May 2014. This was the singer's first appearance as an actress in a feature film. The film describes how the life of a rich family in Haiti changes after the 2010 earthquake. Besides Ayọ the film features French actors Alex Descas and Thibault Vinçon and Haitian poet and novice actress Kermonde Lovely Fifi. The script was co-written by the Haitian novelist and poet Lyonel Trouillot and the screenwriter Pascal Bonitzer. The film had its world premiere at the 2014 Toronto International Film Festival on 5 September 2014. The European premiere of the film was in the Panorama category of the 65th Berlin International Film Festival on 7 February 2015. Ayọ, the other leading actors, producer Remi Grellety, and director Raoul Peck attended the second screening of the film on 10 February at the Zoo Palast after a photocall and press conference at the Grand Hyatt hotel.

Ayọ (Joy Ogunmakin) is part of the cast of the German science fiction drama VOLT written and directed by Tarek Ehlail which was filmed around Cologne and scheduled for release in 2016. The German-French co-production is produced by augenschein-Filmproduktion and Les Films D’Antoine. Ayọ plays the role of LaBlanche besides actors Benno Fürmann, Denis Moschitto, and Stipe Erceg. Ayọ Ogunmakin has been nominated in the category 'German Cinema New Talent Award: Actor' at the Filmfest München 2016 for her role in VOLT. The film has its world premiere screening in Munich on the 24 June 2016.

== Discography ==
Albums

- Joyful (2006)
- Gravity at Last (2008)
- Billie-Eve (2011)
- Ticket to the World (2013)
- Ayọ (2017)
- Royal (2020)
- Mami Wata (2024)

Singles

- "Life Is Real" (2006)
- "Down on My Knees" (2006)
- "And It's Supposed to Be Love" (2007) (2008, US)
- "Help is Coming" (2007)
- "Slow Slow (Run Run)" (2008)
- "On aime, on aide" (2009)
- "Lonely" (2009)
- "I'm Gonna Dance" (2011)
- "I Want You Back" (2011)
- "Fire" (2013)
- "Fire" featuring Youssoupha (2013)
- "Who" (2014)
- "I'm a Fool" (2017)
- "Paname" (2017)
- "Beautiful" (2019)
- "Rest assured" (2020)
- "I'll Be Right Here" featuring Keziah Jones (2021)

DVDs

- AYO Live in Monte Carlo (2007, from PBS)
- Ayọ Live at the Olympia (2007)

EP

- Where Will I Be (vinyl record, 2004)

Contributions

- "Kido Musik" (as Joy, member of the band La Taste, 1992)
- "Liebe & Verstand" (with Sisters Keepers (in German), 2001)
- "Confusion" (on Ep Cris Prolific [Versatile records], 2004)
- "Play Boy" (on album PlayUp, 2006)
- "Worried About You" (on album Heaven by The Avener, 2020)

Music videos

- "La Maladie d'Amour" (as Joy, member of the band La Taste, 1993)
- "Down on My Knees" (2006)
- "Help Is Coming" (2007)
- "Life Is Real" (2007)
- "And It's Supposed to Be Love" (2007)
- "Slow Slow (Run Run)" (2008)
- "Lonely" (2009)
- "I'm Gonna Dance" (2011)
- "I Want You Back" (2011) (directed by J.G Biggs)
- "Boom Boom" (2015)
- "I'm a Fool" (2017)

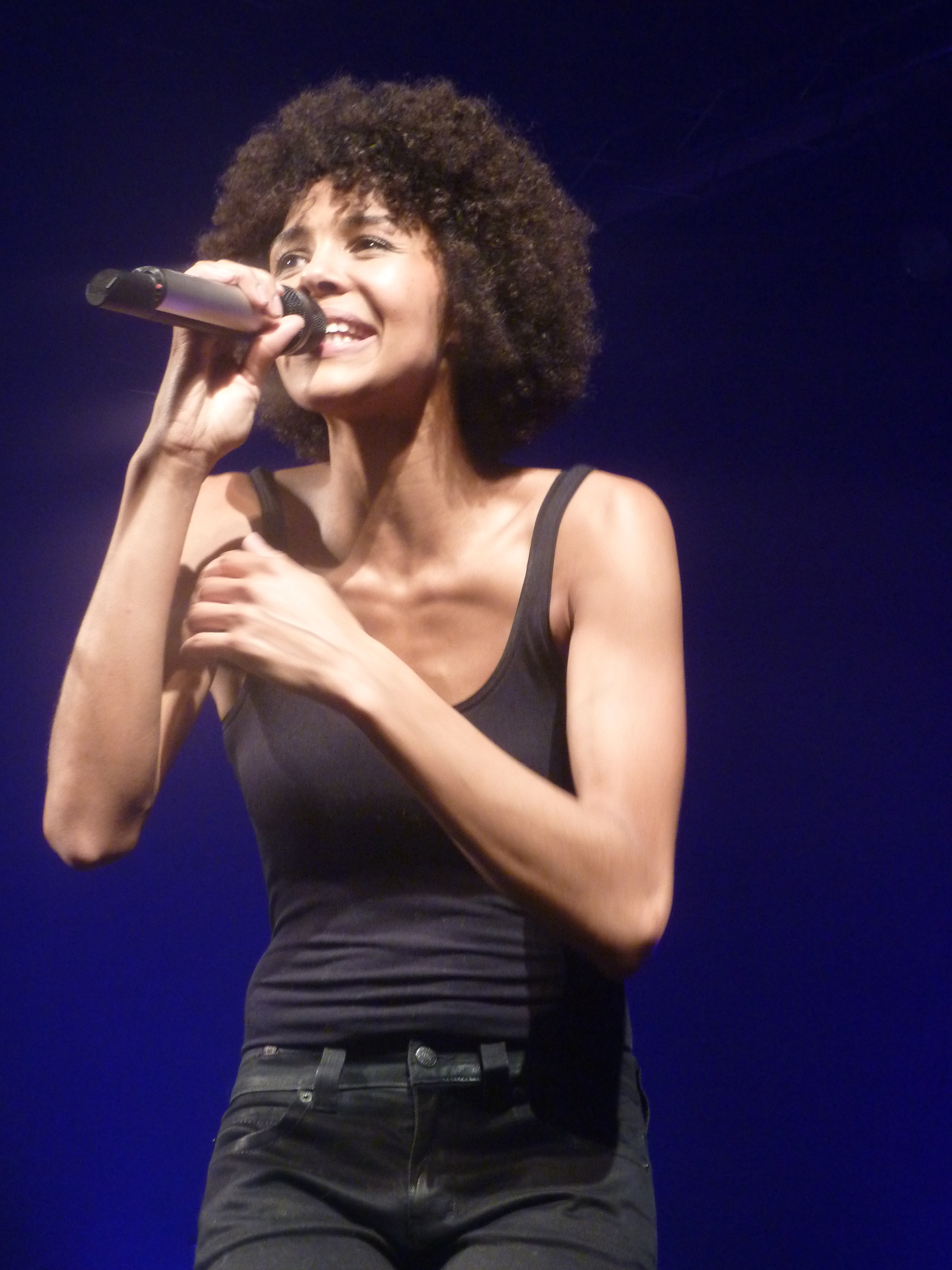
Concert at Trianon, Paris on 21. March 2011 (photo by oouinouin)

== Filmography ==
- Ayo Joy (2009 documentary)
- Murder in Pacot (2015)
- Volt (2016)

== TV ==
- Summer of Soul (2013, French Arte TV)
- Mission Incognito: Ayo (2014, ARTE)

== Awards ==
- European Border Breakers Awards 2008
- Globes de Cristal Award, Best Female Singer 2014
- Grand Prize for SACEM repertoire abroad
