= Live 1.0 =

Live album by Calogero
- Released: August 22, 2005
- Genres: Pop, rock
- Length: CD 1 = 49:06; CD 2 = 60:51
- Labels: Universal, Mercury

Calogero chronology
3 (2004)	Live 1.0 (2005)	Pomme C (2007)

Singles from Live 1.0
- 1. "Safe Sex" Released: 2005; 2. "Devant toi" Released: 2005; 3. "Un Jour parfait" Released: 2005

Live 1.0 is an album recorded in 2005 by the French artist Calogero. It was his first live album and was released on August 22, 2005, and hit success in France and Wallonia, Belgium, topping the albums charts of these countries.

This live album was recorded on March 15 and 16, 2005 at the Forest National, in Brussels. It contains song from his first three albums, but particularly from 3 and Calogero. Three songs recorded as duets are available on this album : with Passi ("Face à la mer"), Raphaël ("Sur la route", song originally performed by Raphaël and Jean-Louis Aubert), and La Grande Sophie ("Du courage"). There is also a cover version of Dutch singer Dave's song, "Du côté de chez Swan".

The concert was also available as a DVD on November 7, 2005, and was certified triple platinum one month after it release, and finally diamond after four months.

The three songs released to promote the album were just promotional singles.

== Track listing ==
First CD

#	Title	Length
1.	"Un Jour parfait" (Raphaël / Calogero - Gioacchino)	5:36
2.	"De Cendres et de Terre" (J.Kopf - J.D'Aimé - L.Florence / Calogero)	4:49
3.	"Il bat" (Zazie / Calogero - Gioacchino)	4:22
4.	"Qui parlait" (L.Florence / Calogero - M.Aymé)	4:57
5.	"Tien An Men" (L.Florence / Calogero - Gioacchino)	5:06
6.	"À la gueule des noyés" (P.Guirao / Calogero - Gioacchino)	5:06
7.	"Aussi libre que moi" (A.Filippi / L.Florence - Calogero)	7:02
8.	"Les Hommes endormis" (Zazie - P.Guirao / Calogero - Gioacchino)	5:21
9.	"Si seulement je pouvais lui manquer" (M.Jourdan - J.D'Aimé / Calogero - Gioacchino)	4:03
10.	"Une Dernière Chance" (F.Hardy / Calogero)	6:29

Second CD

#	Title	Length
1.	"Face à la mer" (Passi - Alana Filippi / Calogero - Gioacchino)	3:59
2.	"Du Côté de chez Swan"	3:57
3.	"Prendre l'air" (M.Garamon / Calogero)	4:56
4.	"Devant toi" (Zazie / Calogero)	6:39
5.	"Prendre racine" (P.Guirao / Calogero - Gioacchino)	5:27
6.	"Safe Sex" (L.Florence / Calogero - Gioacchino)	5:19
7.	"Le Secret" (C.Lidon / Calogero)	8:31
8.	"Le Plus Beau Jour" (R.Haroche / Calogero - O.Marly)	4:15
9.	"En apesanteur" (A.Filippi / Calogero - Gioacchino)	4:46
10.	"Yalla" (L.Florence / Calogero)	9:45
11.	"Du Courage" (Duet with La Grande Sophie)	3:53
12.	"Sur la route" (R.Haroche)	4:33
13.	"Bruxelles"	2:45

== Charts and sales ==
=== CD ===
==== Weekly charts ====
Chart (2005–2006)	Peak position
Belgian (Wallonia) Albums Chart	1
French Digital Chart	1
French Albums Chart	1
Swiss Albums Chart	14

==== Year-end charts ====
Chart (2005)	Position
Belgian (Wallonia) Albums Chart	18
French Albums Chart	55
Chart (2006)	Position
French Albums Chart	145

=== DVD ===
==== Weekly charts ====
Chart (2005–2006)	Peak position
Belgian (Wallonia) Musical DVD Chart	1
French Musical DVD Chart	2

==== Year-end charts ====
Chart (2005)	Position
Belgian (Wallonia) Musical DVD Chart	5
Chart (2006)	Position
French Musical DVD Chart	29

=== Certifications ===
Country	Certification	Date	Sales certified	Physical sales
Belgium (Wallonia)	Gold	28 January 2006	20,000	
France (CD)	Gold	14 December 2005	100,000	200,600
France (DVD)	Diamond	22 March 2005	100,000	
