= Ayo (Ayo album) =

Ayọ

Studio album by Ayọ
- Released: 6 October 2017
- Recorded: 2017
- Studio: Brooklyn, New York
- Genre: Soul; folk
- Length: 59:09
- Label: Ogun

Ayọ chronology
Ticket to the World (2013)	Ayọ (2017)	Royal (2020)

Singles from Ayọ
- 1. "I'm a Fool" Released: 28 June 2017; 2. "Paname" Released: 7 September 2017

Ayọ is the fifth studio album by German singer and songwriter Ayọ, released on 6 October 2017 by Ogun Music.

In an interview, the singer explains the reason why she took the unusual step to name not her first but her fifth album after herself: "My previous records were me, but this record is all of me. It's like a new beginning where I can truly be myself for the first time without having to explain my mission, or myself." The music on the new album aims to blend folk reggae, pop and hip-hop with soul-infused vibes.

The first single from the album, "I'm a Fool", was released in June 2017. The second single "Paname" (a nickname for Paris and its suburbs) was released in September 2017. The song was named after the gypsy name for Paris. For both singles a music video was published.

The album was written over the last three to four years during a time of great personal and career changes. The songs were recorded in Brooklyn, New York in the singer's apartment on her laptop or even on her phone.

== Track listing ==
1. "Nothing" – 4:30
2. "All I Want" – 3:38
3. "Paname" – 2:37
4. "Boom Boom" – 3:58
5. "Why" – 3:50
6. "If Love Is a Killer" – 2:59
7. "Velvet Clouds" – 4:39
8. "Cupcakes and Candies" – 3:46
9. "Let It Rain" – 4:28
10. "I Pray" – 4:35
11. "I'm a Fool" – 4:27
12. "Again" – 3:33
13. "Forever and Beyond" – 4:33
14. "Fearless" – 7:36

== Charts ==
Chart performance for Ayọ
Chart (2017)	Peak position
Belgian Albums (Ultratop Wallonia)	133
French Albums (SNEP)	93
