= Circus (French band) =

French musical band

- Origin: France
- Genres: Pop
- Years active: 2012–present
- Members: Calogero; Stanislas; Philippe Uminski; Elsa Fourlon; Karen Brunon

Circus is a French band established in 2012 by Calogero, Stanislas, Philippe Uminski, Elsa Fourlon and Karen Brunon. All are already established artists.

Their debut self-titled album Circus was released on 5 November 2012. The songs, mostly about the circus are written by Jean-Jacques Goldman, Dominique A, Marc Lavoine and Marie Bastide. The pre-released single from the album is "Sur un fil" that was released on 18 June 2012, on radio and downloads. A big concert was also organized in Théâtre Marigny in Paris in 2013.

== Band members ==
All five members contribute vocals and play at least one instrument each in the band:

- Calogero – vocals, bass guitar and harmonica
- Stanislas – vocals, piano and keyboard
- Philippe Uminski – vocals, guitar
- Elsa Fourlon – vocals and guitar
- Karen Brunon – vocals and violin

== Discography ==
=== Album ===
2012: Circus Track list

1. "C'est quoi ce cirque?" (Lyrics: Marie Bastide – Jean-Jacques Goldman / Music: Calogero – Philippe Uminski) – (3:29)
2. "Sur un fil" (Lyrics: Jean-Jacques Goldman / Music: Calogero – Gioacchino – Stanislas) (4:13)
3. "Moi je joue" (Lyrics: Marc Lavoine – Philippe Uminski / Music: Calogero – Stanislas) (3:18)
4. "Chagrin d'ami" (Lyrics: Marc Lavoine / Music: Calogero) (3:17)
5. "Ce soir et demain" (Lyrics: Marc Lavoine / Music: Calogero) (4:16)
6. "L'Amour suicide" (Lyrics: Marc Lavoine / Music: Calogero) (3:22)
7. "Le Numéro" (Lyrics: Philippe Uminski / Music: Calogero – Stanislas) (3:28)
8. "Les Nuits romaines" (Lyrics: Dominique A / Music: Calogero – Stanislas) (5:30)
9. "La Prière de Rosa" (Lyrics: Marie Bastide / Music: Stanislas) (1:14)
10. "Je tombe" (Lyrics: Marie Bastide / Music: Calogero) (3:26)
11. "Stella monte" (Lyrics: Marie Bastide / Music: Gioacchino – Stanislas) (2:21)
12. "Souvenir" (Lyrics: Marc Lavoine / Music: Calogero – Gioacchino – Stanislas) (3:22)
13. "L'Origine" (Lyrics: Marc Lavoine / Music: Calogero) (3:35)

=== Singles ===
Year	Album	Peak positions	Album
Year	Album	FR	Album
2012	Sur un fil	102	Circus
