= Billie-Eve =

Studio album by Ayọ
- Released: 7 March 2011 (France)
- Recorded: Sear Sound, New York City and Paris
- Genres: Reggae, soul
- Length: 57:17
- Label: Polydor

Ayọ chronology
Gravity at Last (2008)	Billie-Eve (2011)	Ticket to the World (2013)

Billie-Eve is the third studio album by Nigerian-German singer-songwriter Ayọ. The album is named after her daughter and was recorded in New York with the cooperation of musicians like Craig Ross (guitarist of Lenny Kravitz), the rapper Saul Williams, Matthieu Chedid and Gail Ann Dorsey, bass player of David Bowie. The recording took five days like her previous two albums. Four songs, including "It Hurts" and "Real Love", were recorded afterwards in Paris.

The song "I'm Gonna Dance" was released as a single and music video in February 2011.

== Track listing ==
1. "How Many People" – 7:21
2. "I'm Gonna Dance" – 3:04
3. "Black Spoon" – 4:08
4. "I Can't" – 3:27
5. "Flowers" – 4:29
6. "Real Love" – 3:21
7. "Julia" – 3:33
8. "My Man" – 3:03
9. "It's Too Late" – 4:20
10. "Who Are They ?" – 4:11
11. "We Have Got To" – 4:12
12. "Before" – 4:32
13. "It Hurts" – 3:15
14. "Believe" – 1:48
15. "I Want You Back" (bonus track) – 2:33

Track 16 (on the limited edition) is either

16. "I'm Sorry" – 3:59

or

16. "I Know a Place" – 4:30

== Charts ==
Chart (2011)	Peak position
Belgian Albums (Ultratop Wallonia)	11
French Albums (SNEP)	8
German Albums (Offizielle Top 100)	93
Polish Albums (OLiS)	30
Swiss Albums (Schweizer Hitparade)	25
