= Tarek Ehlail =

German director, screenwriter and producer (1981-2025)

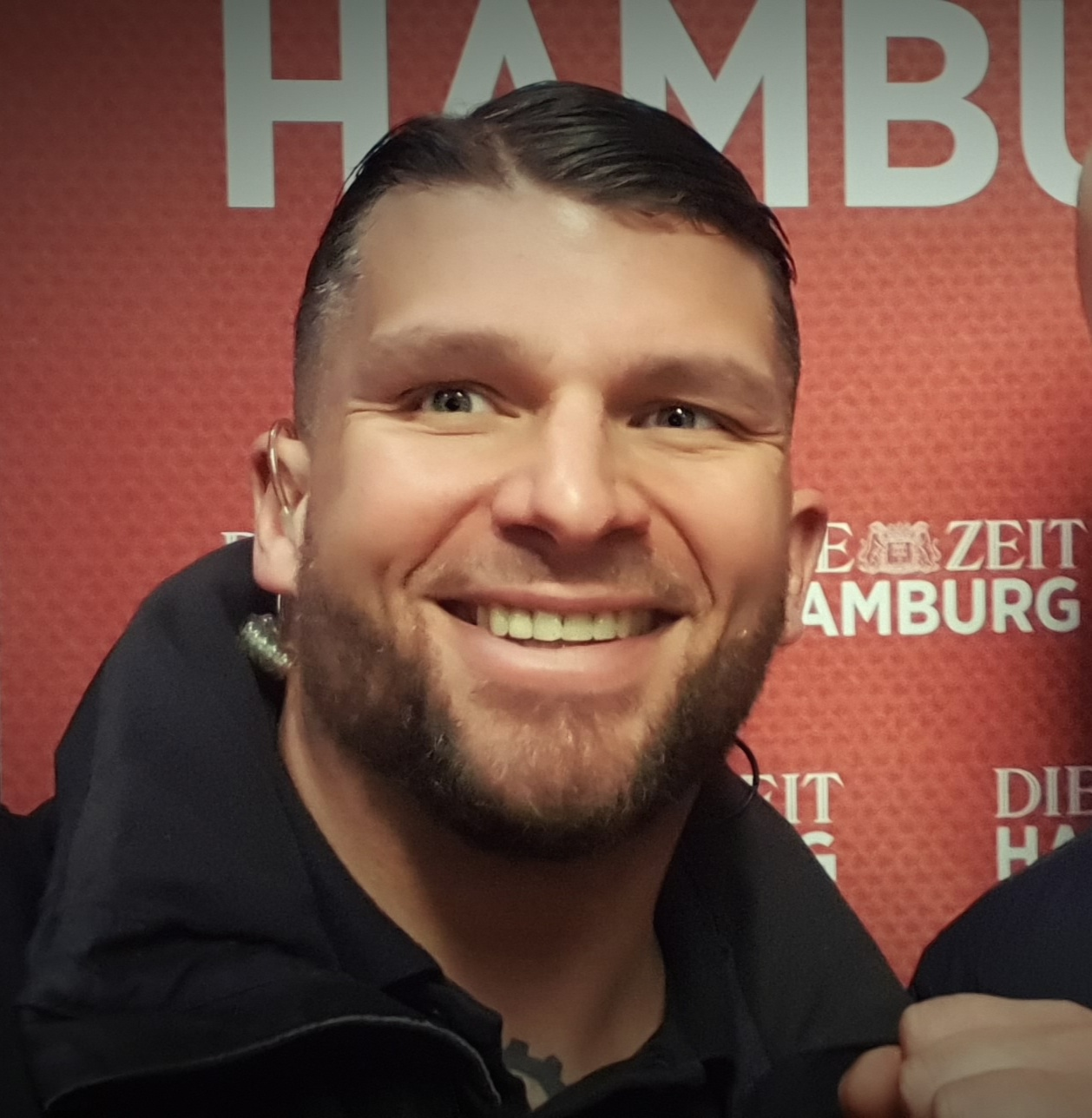
- Ehlail in 2019
- Born: 31 August 1981; Homburg, Saarland, Germany
- Died: 29 August 2025 (aged 43); Bundesautobahn 1, near Cologne, North Rhine-Westphalia, Germany
- Occupations: Film director, producer, screenwriter

Tarek Ehlail (31 August 1981 – 29 August 2025) was a German film director, screenwriter, and film producer.

== Background ==
Ehlail, son of a Palestinian father and German mother, became a punk as a teenager and worked for about 10 years as body piercer. In 2003 he started the production company Sabotakt which produced mainly special underground projects and independent films. Together with Matthias Lange, Ehlail founded the first German 'Punkfightclub', the Sabotakt Boxparty, a punk and martial arts event which toured through Europe.

Ehlail died in a traffic collision, on 29 August 2025, two days before his 44th birthday.

== Work ==
In 2008 Ehlail produced together with Matthias Lange his debut film Chaostage - We are Punks! starring Ben Becker, Martin Semmelrogge, Ralf Richter, Stipe Erceg, Claude-Oliver Rudolph, Helge Schneider and Uwe Fellensiek. The Saarlandmedien supported in 2009 his cinema film Gegengerade about the FC St. Pauli. The film cast included Mario Adorf, Moritz Bleibtreu and Fabian Busch and was selected into the competition at the 'Filmfestival Max Ophüls Preis' in 2011. In 2011 and 2012 the documentaries Alles in Allem about a tour of the electro band Egotronic and GLAUBENSKRIEGER about the annual Internationale Soldatenwallfahrt to Lourdes were produced by Ehlail.

In March 2013, Ehlail published his first book Piercing is not a crime (Schwarzkopf & Schwarzkopf publisher). The book tells 33 anecdotes from the time when Ehlail worked as tattoo artist. The book cover shows him together with the tattoo model Lexy Hell.

Ehlail's film Volt, a science fiction drama, was filmed in 2015 as German-French co-production by augenschein-Filmproduktion and Les Films D’Antoine around Cologne and supported by the German Federal Film Board. The cast included Ayọ (Joy Ogunmakin), Benno Fürmann, Denis Moschitto and Stipe Erceg.

== Filmography (selection) ==
=== Films ===
- Chaostage – We Are Punks! (2007/2008)
- Gegengerade (2011)
- Volt (film) (2016)

=== Documentaries ===
- Don't panic it's only war … (2003)
- Bonobo - Die Sabotakt Reise um die Welt (2004)
- Deutschlands Golden Boy (story of German boxer René Weller, 2005)
- Alles in Allem Egotronic Tourfilm (2011)
- GLAUBENSKRIEGER (2013)

=== Music videos ===
- Produzenten der Froide: R n R Schwindel (2008)
- Nyze feat. Bushido (2009)
- D-Bo: Frust (2009)
- Nyze: Easy (2009)
- D-Bo: Diskothek (2009)
- Kay One: Ich brech die Herzen (2010)
- Slime: Gewinnen werden immer wir (2010)
- Egotronic: Hamburg soll brennen (2010)
- Johnny Mauser: Die Mauer (2013)
