= Ticket to the World =

Studio album by Ayọ
- Released: 7 October 2013
- Recorded: 2013
- Genre: Soul; folk
- Label: Motown France
- Producer: Jay Newland

Ayọ chronology
Billie-Eve (2011)	Ticket to the World (2013)	Ayọ (2017)

Ticket to the World is the fourth studio album by German singer and songwriter Ayọ, released on 7 October 2013 by Motown France. The album was produced and mixed by Jay Newland, who was also the producer of her first two albums, with musicians like Larry Campbell, Ira Coleman, Charles Haynes, Youssoupha and Clarence Greenwood (Citizen Cope), George Brenner (composer) and Glenn Patscha and Sherrod Barnes (ensemble).

The first single from the album, "Fire", was released on 10 June 2013. A second version of the single featuring Congolese-French rapper Youssoupha was released in August 2013.

The album was also released as a digisleeve CD, on vinyl and as a Fnac special edition collector box containing the "Fire" single on 45 T vinyl, two photo prints and a digisleeve CD.

== Track listing ==
1. "Fire"
2. "I'm Walking"
3. "Teach Love"
4. "Justice" (featuring Citizen Cope)
5. "Fallin'"
6. "Complain"
7. "Who"
8. "I Wonder"
9. "Ticket to the World"
10. "Hullabaloo"
11. "Sister"
12. "Wouldn't It Be Better"
13. "I Need You"
14. "Milky Way"
15. "Sunny" (bonus track)
16. "Fire" (featuring Youssoupha) (bonus track)

== Charts ==
=== Weekly charts ===
Chart performance for Ticket to the World
Chart (2013–2014)	Peak position
Belgian Albums (Ultratop Flanders)	156
Belgian Albums (Ultratop Wallonia)	20
French Albums (SNEP)	11
German Albums (Offizielle Top 100)	76
Swiss Albums (Schweizer Hitparade)	28

=== Year-end charts ===
Year-end chart performance for Ticket to the World
Chart (2013)	Position
French Albums (SNEP)	192
