= Face à la mer =

Single by Calogero and Passi

from the album 3
- B-side: "Qui parlait"; "Yalla" (CD maxi)
- Released: June 2004
- Recorded: 2004
- Genre: Rock
- Length: 3:42
- Label: Universal Records; Mercury
- Songwriters: Gioacchino Maurici, Calogero, Passi, Alana Filippi
- Producers: Pierre Jaconelli, Calogero

Calogero singles chronology
"Yalla" (2004)	"Face à la mer" (2004)	"Si seulement je pouvais lui manquer" (2004)

Music video
- "Face à la mer" on YouTube

"Face à la mer" (French: "Facing the Sea") is the name of a 2004 song recorded as a duet by singers Calogero and Passi. It was the second single from Calogero's third studio album, 3, on which it features as third track. It achieved success in the countries in which it was released, becoming to date Calogero's most successful single on the charts.

== Song information ==
The text was written by Passi and Alana Filippi, while the music was composed by Calogero and his brother, Gioacchino. The song mixes pop (verses sung by Calogero) and R&B (that of Passi) styles.

In the French TV program La Chanson de l'année 2004, broadcast on TF1, the song was awarded 'Song of the year' thanks to the voters of the TV viewers.

The song was included on many French compilations, such as Mission Tubes, Duos, NRJ Music Awards 2005, Total Hits 2004 and Duos d'aujourd'hui.

"Face à la mer" was performed by both singers during Calogero's first concerts tour and was thus available on his live album Live 1.0 (first track, CD 2). The song was covered by Michèle Laroque, Lââm, Patrick Fiori, Patricia Kaas and MC Solaar for Les Enfoirés' album 2006: Le Village des Enfoirés, on which it is the fourth track.

It was covered in Greek by singer Andriana Babali and rapper Stereo Mike in 2007 as "Des kathara" (Δες καθαρά, Look clearly). The Greek version is not an exact translation of the lyrics but follows the exact melody and also retains the original French chorus for the first half of the song.

== Chart performance ==
The single went to number seven on the French Singles Chart on 13 June 2004. It reached number three in its fourth and fifth weeks and remained for 15 weeks in the top ten, then dropped quickly, totaling 19 weeks in the top 50 and 22 weeks on the chart (top 100). It ranked 11th on the End of the Year Chart. The song achieved success in radio (number 19) was also the most aired on Radio 6 in 2004, with 636 broadcastings and 2,824,700 listeners. As of August 2014, it was the 92nd best-selling single of the 21st century in France, with 317,000 units.

In Belgium (Wallonia), the single was more successful: it debuted at number ten on 26 June, then climbed to number two the week after, but was unable to dislodge O-Zone's summer hit "Dragostea din tei" which topped the chart. It stayed for ten weeks in the top ten, dropped slowly on the chart and fell off the top 40 after its 19th week. It features at number 14 on the Annual Chart.

In Switzerland, the single had a long chart trajectory of 26 weeks in the top 100, ten of them in the top 20. It went to number 19 on 4 July, dropped the weeks after but jumped to number 12 for two consecutive weeks. It was the 56th best-selling single of 2004.

== Track listings ==
- CD single
1. "Face à la mer" — 3:42
2. "Qui parlait" by Calogero — 3:53
- CD maxi
1. "Face à la mer" — 3:42
2. "Qui parlait" by Calogero — 3:53
3. "Yalla" by Calogero — 3:50
- CD single - Promo
1. "Face à la mer" — 3:42
- Digital download
1. "Face à la mer" — 3:42
2. "Face à la mer" (live) — 3:59

== Charts ==
=== Weekly charts ===
Chart (2004)	Peak position
Belgian (Wallonia) Singles Chart	2
French Singles Chart	3
Swiss Singles Chart	12

=== Year-end charts ===
Chart (2004)	Position
Belgian (Wallonia) Singles Chart	14
French Airplay Chart	19
French Singles Chart	11
French TV Music Videos Chart	5
Swiss Singles Chart	56
