= En apesanteur =

2002 song recorded by Calogero

Single by Calogero

from the album Calogero
- B-side: "Une Dernière Chance"
- Released: 28 May 2002 (CD single); 27 July 2002 (CD maxi)
- Recorded: 2001
- Genre: Pop rock
- Length: 3:23
- Label: Universal Records, Mercury
- Songwriters: Gioacchino Maurici, Calogero, Alana Filippi
- Producer: Pierre Jaconelli

Calogero singles chronology
"Aussi libre que moi" (2001)	"En apesanteur" (2002)	"Tien An Men" (2003)

"En apesanteur" (pronounced [ɑ̃n‿apəzɑ̃tœʁ]) is a song recorded by French singer Calogero. It was the second single from Calogero's second studio album, Calogero, on which it features as first track, and his fifth single overall. It achieved success in Belgium (Wallonia) and France and became the singer's first hit since he had started a solo career.

== Song information ==
As for two other tracks from the album, the text was written by Alana Filippi, while the music was composed by Calogero and his brother, Gioacchino. The song has pop sonorities and is popular in France thanks to its catchy refrain in which the singer repeats only 'en apesanteur' and performs the background vocals.

The music video was shot in a lift in which the singer and a woman (played by Mélanie Doutey) are falling in love.

The song was included on many French compilations, such as Hits de diamant (released in 2007), Le Top: 20 ans de tubes, vol. 3 (2004), Les Plus Belles Voix, vol. 1, NRJ Music Awards 2003, Stars France 2003 (2003), Now! Hits Référence, Vol. 2 and Best of France 2002 (2002).

"En apesanteur" was performed by the singer during Calogero's first concerts tour and was thus available on his live album Live 1.0 (ninth track, CD 2). In 2008, the song was covered by Tina Arena, Claire Keim, Pascal Obispo and Patrick Fiori for Les Enfoirés' album 2008: Les Secrets des Enfoirés, on which it is the seventh track.

In 2011, Shy'm released a cover of the song as fifth single from the second issue of her album Prendre l'air. Her version peaked at number 40 in France.

== Chart performance ==
On the French Singles Chart, the single debuted at number 36 on 1 June 2002 and dropped regularly, remaining under number 25 until its 12th week. It managed to reach a peak of number 13 in the 17th week, then almost did not stop to drop on the chart. It totaled 24 weeks in the top 50 and 33 weeks on the chart (top 100). It ranked 63rd on the End of the Year Chart. Regularly aired on radios, it was the 14th most broadcast song of the year.

The single had a similar chart trajectory in Belgium (Wallonia): it began at number 35 on 22 June and reached number 15 three weeks after. It peaked there for four non consecutive weeks and remained for 22 weeks in the top 40, nine of them in the top 20. It was the 39th best-selling single of the year.

== Track listings ==
- CD maxi
1. "En apesanteur" — 3:23
2. "Une Dernière Chance" — 4:47
3. "En apesanteur" (acoustic) — 3:12
4. "Aussi libre que moi" (Acoustic) — 4:05
- CD single
1. "En apesanteur — 3:23
2. "Une Dernière Chance" — 4:47
- Digital download
1. "En apesanteur" — 3:23
2. "En apesanteur" (live) — 4:46

== Charts ==
=== Weekly charts ===
Chart (2002)	Peak position
Belgian (Wallonia) Singles Chart	15
French SNEP Singles Chart	13

=== Year-end charts ===
Chart (2002)	Position
Belgian (Wallonia) Singles Chart	39
French Airplay Chart	14
French Singles Chart	63
French TV Music Videos Chart	50

== Shy'm version ==
"En Apesanteur"

Single by Shy'm

from the album Prendre l'air
- Released: October 31, 2011
- Recorded: 2010
- Genre: Pop
- Length: 3:40
- Label: K-Pone, WMG France
- Songwriters: Gioacchino Maurici, Calogero, Alana Filippi
- Producer: Cyril Kamar

Shy'm singles chronology
"Tourne" (2011)	"En Apesanteur" (2011)	"Et alors !" (2012)

"En apesanteur" was covered by French singer Shy'm for her third album Prendre l'air. The song was released in October 31, 2011 as the fifth and final single from the album, because of her participation on the programme Danse avec les stars and the popularity that she earned in the contest. Later, she became the winner of the season 2 of the show, and this made that the song started to play in radio stations and recorded a video in a way to thank her fans for the support during the competition. Her version performed well on the charts, and peaked at number 32 on the French singles chart.

The video was released in November of the same year, and shows about ambiguity of people in different ways.

=== Charts ===
==== Weekly charts ====
Weekly chart performance for "En apesanteur"
Chart (2011–12)	Peak position
Belgium (Ultratop 50 Wallonia)	28
France (SNEP)	32
Russia Airplay (TopHit)	29

==== Year-end charts ====
Year-end chart performance for "En apesanteur"
Chart (2012)	Position
Russia Airplay (TopHit)	74
