= 3 (Calogero album) =

Studio album by Calogero
- Released: 21 March 2004
- Recorded: France
- Genre: Pop, R&B
- Length: 48:14
- Label: Universal Records; Mercury

Calogero chronology
Calogero (2002)	3 (2004)	Live 1.0 (2005)

Singles from 3
- 1. "Yalla" Released: January 2004; 2. "Face à la mer" Released: June 2004; 3. "Si seulement je pouvais lui manquer" Released: November 2004

3 is the third studio album recorded by the French singer and songwriter Calogero. It was released in 2004 and achieved smash success, becoming the second best-selling album of the year in France.

== Album information ==
The album, for which all the music was composed by Calogero, was written by several artists, such as Lionel Florence (who had already worked with Pascal Obispo, Patricia Kaas and Nolwenn Leroy), Zazie, Raphael and Calogero's brother, Gioacchino. The R&B duet with Passi on "Face à la mer", was the most successful single from this album. The single "Si seulement je pouvais lui manquer" is dedicated to Calogero's father, and the last track, "La Bienvenue", is a tribute his daughter who was born shortly before.

The album was charted for two years in France and Belgium (Wallonia), topping their chart, and achieved success in Switzerland, and hitting Platinum certifications in these countries.

3 was released as a CD, but there was also a collector edition composing of a CD and a DVD on which there is an interview of Calogero. There were three singles from this album, but "Yalla" was just a promotional single, while the two others were top ten hits in France and Belgium (Wallonia).

The album was also simultaneously released on hybrid stereo/multichannel Super Audio CD. In 2013 the high resolution stereo version was repurposed as a 24/96 download for Qobuz and other providers, and both the stereo and surround programmes were used to make a High Fidelity Pure Audio Blu-ray disc.

== Track listing ==
CD

No.	Title	Writer(s)	Length
1.	"Yalla"	L.Florence / Calogero	4:48
2.	"Il bat"	Zazie / Calogero – Gioacchino	4:20
3.	"Face à la mer" (Duet with Passi)	Passi – Alana Filippi / Calogero – Gioacchino	3:43
4.	"Si seulement je pouvais lui manquer"	M.Jourdan – J.D'Aimé / Calogero – Gioacchino	3:20
5.	"Qui parlait"	L.Florence / Calogero – M.Aymé	3:50
6.	"Fais comme tu veux"	P.Guirao / Gioacchino	3:19
7.	"Je n'ai que nous à vivre"	P.Guirao / Calogero – Gioacchino	4:47
8.	"Un Jour parfait"	Raphaël / Calogero – Gioacchino	4:41
9.	"Les Hommes endormis"	Zazie – P.Guirao / Calogero – Gioacchino	3:54
10.	"Safe Sex"	L.Florence / Calogero – Gioacchino	3:42
11.	"Rare"	A.Filippi / Calogero – Gioacchino	5:18
12.	"La Bienvenue"	P.Grillet / Calogero	2:55

DVD

Making of

== Credits ==
- Tracks 2, 3, 5, 6, 8, 9, 11, 12 :
  - Produced by Philippe Uminski and Calogero
  - Recorded and mixed by Erwin Autrique at studios ICP
- Tracks 1, 4, 7, 10 :
  - Produced by Pierre Jaconelli and Calogero
  - Recorded by Pete Schwier at studio Gang
  - Assistant : Florian Lagatta
- Mixed by Erwin Autrique at studios ICP TBC

Except "Si seulement je pouvais lui manquer" : mixed by Pete Schwier; "Je n'ai que nous à vivre" : mixed by Pete Schwier and Erwin Autrique

- Passi's voice on "Face à la mer" recorded by Philippe Balzé, Vincent Creusot, at studio plus XXX
- Strings recorded at studios Ferber by René Ameline, assisted by Laurent Binder, and at studios Méga by Patrice Kung, assisted by Dimitri Kurts, with Les Archers de Paris and L'Orchestre de Massy
- Additional recordings : Michel Dierickx, Phil Delire at studio ICP
- Mastering George Marino at Sterling Sound
- Artistic direction : Caroline Molko
- Executive production : Sandrine Lebars
- Photos : Kate Barry
- Photos patchwork : André D.
- Artwork : Autrement Le Design'

== Charts and sales ==
=== Weekly charts ===
Chart (2004–05)	Peak position
Belgian (Wallonia) Albums Chart	1
Belgian (Wallonia) Mid Price Chart	1
French SNEP Albums Chart	1
Swiss Albums Chart	14

=== Year-end charts ===
Chart (2004)	Position
Belgian (Wallonia) Albums Chart	1
French Albums Chart	2
Swiss Albums Chart	42
Chart (2005)	Position
French Albums Chart	7

=== Certifications ===
Country	Certification	Date	Sales certified	Physical sales
Belgium (Wallonia)	Platinum	February 26, 2005	50,000	
France	Diamond	March 2, 2005	1,000,000	1,230,000
Switzerland	Platinum	2005	40,000	
