= La débâcle des sentiments =

Single by Stanislas and Calogero

from the album L'Équilibre instable
- B-side: "L'hiver"
- Released: 19 January 2009
- Recorded: 2007
- Genre: Pop
- Length: 4:12
- Label: Polydor
- Songwriter: Amaury Salmon
- Producer: Stanislas

Stanislas singles chronology
"La Belle de Mai" (2008)	"La débâcle des sentiments" (2009)	"Les lignes de ma main" (2009)

"La débâcle des sentiments" is a 2007 song recorded by French singer and composer Stanislas, as a duet with Calogero. It was the third single from his debut album L'Équilibre instable on which it appears as fourth track on the first edition of the album and was released on 19 January 2009. It was written by Amaury Salmon and composed by Stanislas. It was successful in France and Belgium (Wallonia) where it hit respectively number two and number three.

== Release and music video ==
Although the song was sent to radio stations on 24 October 2007 and was available digitally since March 2008 (it entered the Belgian chart at No. 33 on 8 March 2008), the song was only released as a CD single on 19 January 2008, because it was scheduled as first single but was cancelled and replaced by "Le Manège. In the second edition of the album, two versions of the song appears : the duet version and a solo version by Stanislas. As sign of popularity, the song and the music video were included on the famous double compilation NRJ Music Awards 2009.

A music video was shot in a retro decor. In it, both singers are participating in a fictitious show called Words & Words (based on the French real game television programme Des chiffres et des lettres) with the radio host Manu Payet portraying the presenter.

== Chart performance ==
In France, the single went straight to number two, on 24 January 2009, selling 5,019 units that week, being unable to dislodge Mikelangelo Loconte's single "Tatoue-moi" which was number-one then. The single dropped the following weeks and totalled six weeks in the top ten, 20 weeks in the top 50 and 24 weeks on the chart (top 100). In Belgium (Wallonia), the single remained in the top 40 for 18 weeks on the Ultratop 50, four of them in the top ten, with a peak at number three on 20 December 2008, thanks to the digital downloads. It briefly charted for two weeks in the Swiss Singles Chart, peaking at number 68 on 14 December 2008.

== Track listings ==
- CD single

No.	Title	Length
1.	"La débâcle des sentiments"	4:12
2.	"L'Hiver"	5:06

- Digital doawload

No.	Title	Length
1.	"La débâcle des sentiments" (album version)	5:16
2.	"La débâcle des sentiments" (single version)	4:12
3.	"La débâcle des sentiments" (solo version)	5:16

== Charts ==
=== Weekly charts ===
Weekly charts for "La débâcle des sentiments"
Chart (2008–2009)	Peak position
Belgium (Ultratop 50 Wallonia)	3
Europe (Eurochart Hot 100 Singles)	11
France (Digital Chart)	11
France (SNEP)	2
Switzerland (Schweizer Hitparade)	68

=== Year-end charts ===
Year-end charts for "La débâcle des sentiments"
Chart (2009)	Position
Belgium (Ultratop 50 Wallonia)	52
Europe (Eurochart Hot 100 Singles)	63
France (SNEP)	23
