= Rayon de soleil =

Single by William Baldé

from the album En Corps étranger
- B-side: "Yönn-gui"
- Released: July 2008
- Recorded: 2008
- Genre: Roots rock, reggae
- Length: 5:02
- Label: WMI, Warner
- Songwriter(s): Gil Gimenez, Catherine Duval, William Baldé
- Producer(s): Philippe Desbois

William Baldé singles chronology
"Rayon de soleil" (2008)	"Sweet Lady" (2008)

"Rayon de soleil" (English: "Ray of Sunshine") is the name of a 2008 song recorded by the African singer William Baldé. It was his debut single and was released in July 2008 from his album En Corps étranger. It achieved success, becoming a number-one hit in France and Belgium.

== Chart performances ==
In France, the song was announced as the "uncontested summer hit of 2008". The single went straight to number 1 in France with 22,135 sales, and stayed there for other eight non-consecutive weeks. In its sixth week, 23,298 copies were sold, which is to date the second best weekly sales of the year for a number-one hit in France. It remained in the top 50 for 17 weeks and in the top 100 for 24 weeks. It was the second best-selling single of the year, behind "Tired of Being Sorry (Laisse le destin l'emporter)".

It achieved a minor success in Switzerland, peaking at #24 in its fourth week. It also topped the chart in its eighth week in Belgium (Wallonia) and remained in the top 40 for 22 weeks.

As sign of popularity, the song and the music video were included on the famous double compilation NRJ Music Awards 2009.

== Track listings ==
- CD single
1. "Rayon de soleil" — 3:39
2. "Yönn-gui" — 5:08
3. "Rayon de soleil" (video)
- Digital download
1. "Rayon de soleil" (single version) — 5:02
2. "Rayon de soleil" (album version) — 4:26

== Charts and sales ==
=== Peak positions ===
Chart (2008)	Peak position
Belgian (Wallonia) Singles Chart	1
Eurochart Hot 100	5
French Digital Chart	2
French Singles Chart	1
Swiss Singles Chart	24

=== Year-end charts ===
Chart (2008)	Position
Belgian (Wallonia) Singles Chart	23
Eurochart Hot 100	31
French Airplay Chart	78
French Digital Chart	19
French Singles Chart	2
