= Stanislas (singer) =

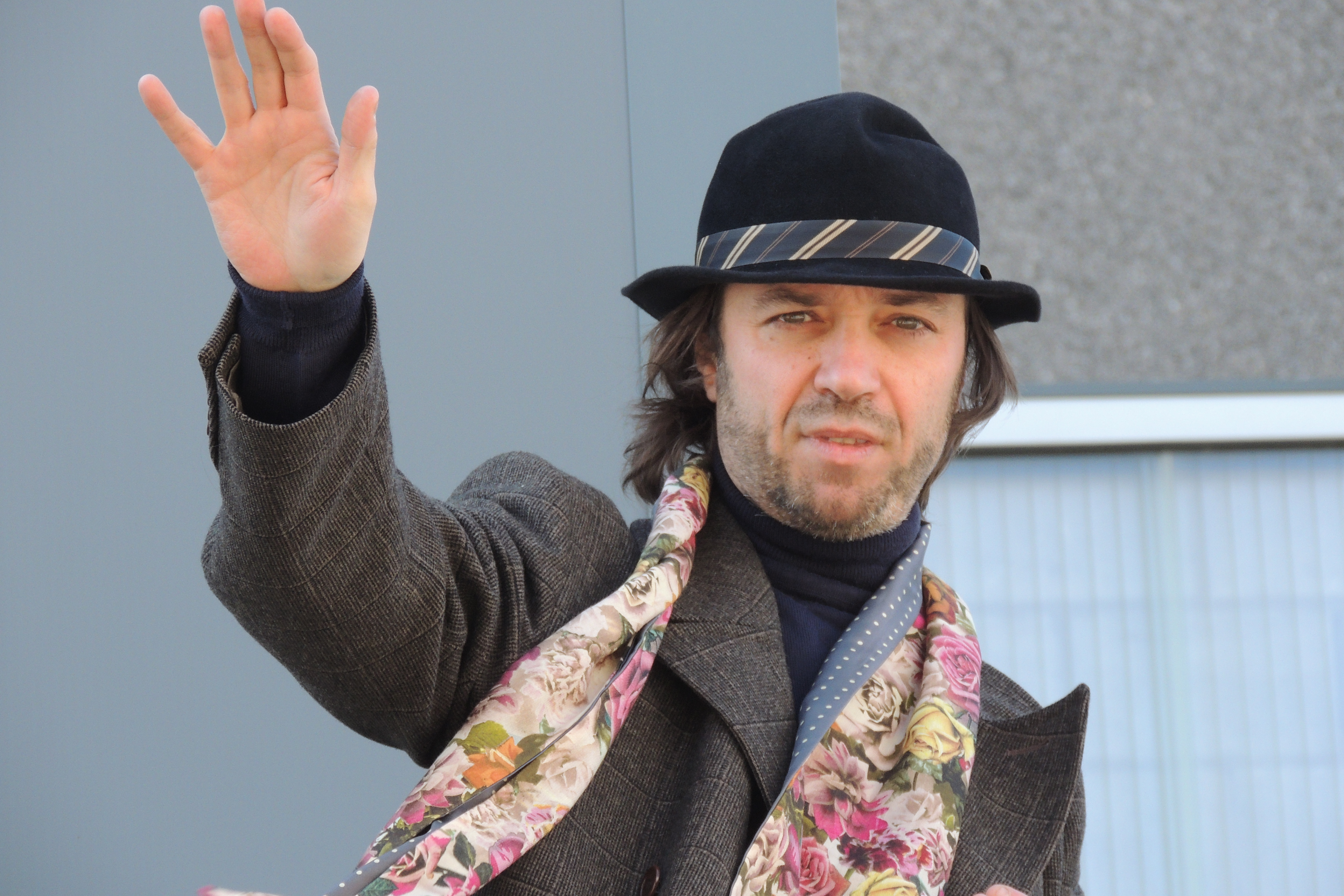
- Stanislas in 2013

Background information
- Born: Louis Stanislas Renoult; 29 May 1972 (age 54)
- Origin: France
- Genres: Pop music
- Occupations: Singer, songwriter
- Years active: 2000–present
- Labels: Polydor, Universal Music
- Member of: Circus
- Website: Official site

Louis Stanislas Renoult (born 29 May 1972), just known as Stanislas, is a French singer. After several musical collaborations since 2000, he met success in 2008 with his first solo album L'Équilibre instable.

== Biography ==
He was born in Fontainebleau, Seine-et-Marne, the son of François Renoult, a musician who had worked with Antoine, notably on the song "Je l'appelle Canelle".

Stanislas entered the Conducting program at the École Normale de Musique de Paris when he was 19. Three years later, he left the school with honors and became the assistant of musical director of the Orchestra of Massy Dominique Rouits where he regularly continues to direct classical works. He also composed, works on arrangements and produced many pop singles for artists such as Daniel Lévi, Calogero (with whom he recorded a duet), Charles Aznavour, Maurane, Kool Shen, Céline Dion.

In 2000, Stanislas formed with Gioacchino (Calogero's brother) the band Pure Orchestra and signed with Atletico Records, the label of Pascal Obispo. Their first single "U&I" was aired on radio in summer 2001 and the album Singing' dog was released in February 2002. In 2004, Stanislas began to write his first solo album and decided to start a new collaboration with his brother Thibaud. They recorded Thibaud's first studio album, entitled Les Pas perdus, then Stanislas' debut album L'Équilibre instable released in late 2007 (Polydor/Universal). His first single "Le Manège" achieved success in France. It was followed by "La Belle de Mai", then by "La débâcle des sentiments", a duet with Calogero.

After a great success of his two concerts at the Alambra of Paris in March 2008, Stanislas was on stage in France and Belgium in November and December 2008 (Massy, Lille, Nantes, Tours, the Olympia of Paris, Ludres, Aix-en-Provence, Toulouse, Bordeaux, Troyes, Brussels, Sanary, Lyon).

He revealed that he first wanted to participate as a contestant in the French version of Star Academy. A fourth single off the album was released, "Les lignes de ma main" in March 2009.

Stanislas was nominated at the 2009 NRJ Music Awards in the categories 'French group/duet of the year' and 'Music video of the year' for his single "La débâcle des sentiments", but did not win.

== Discography ==
=== Albums ===
Year	Album	Information	Charts	
Year	Album	Information	FR	BEL (WA)
2007	L'Équilibre instable	First studio album Date of release : 19 Novembre 2007	10	8
2010	Les Carnets de la vigie	Second studio album Date of release : 4 January 2010	36	19
2011	Top hat	Universal France; Date of release : 27 September 2011	177	93
2014	Ma solitude	Universal France; Date of release : 28 April 2014	58	55

=== Singles ===
Year	Single	Charts			Album
Year	Single	FR	FR (DL)	BEL (WA)	Album
2007	"Le Manège"	2	10	15	L'Équilibre instable
2008	"La Belle de mai"	19	26	—	L'Équilibre instable
2008	"La débâcle des sentiments" ^{1}	2	11	3	L'Équilibre instable
2009	"Les Lignes de ma main"	—	—	—	L'Équilibre instable
2010	"Fou d'elle"	—	—	35	Les Carnets de la vigie

^{1} Duet with Calogero
