= Joyful (Ayo album) =

Studio album by Ayọ
- Released: 12 June 2006
- Recorded: January 2006
- Studio: Sony Music (New York City)
- Genres: Soul; folk; reggae; worldbeat
- Length: 49:42
- Label: Polydor
- Producer: Jay Newland

Ayọ chronology
Joyful (2006)	Gravity at Last (2008)

Singles from Joyful
- 1. "Down on My Knees" Released: 4 September 2006; 2. "And It's Supposed to Be Love" Released: 20 November 2006; 3. "Help Is Coming" Released: 31 May 2007

Professional ratings
Review scores
Source	Rating
AllMusic	3.5/5 stars
CDstarts.de	8/10 stars
laut.de	3/5 stars
letmeentertainyou.de	4/5 stars
Marie Claire (UK)	4/5 stars
PopMatters	6/10

Joyful is the debut studio album by German-Nigerian singer and songwriter Ayọ, released on 12 June 2006 by Polydor Records. The album was recorded over five days in New York City with producer Jay Newland.

Joyful was particularly successful in France, where it peaked at number six on the albums chart and was certified double platinum by the Syndicat National de l'Édition Phonographique (SNEP). The album also reached number one in Poland, number five in Italy and number eight in Finland.

== Track listing ==
All tracks are written by Joy Olasunmibo Ogunmakin, except where noted.

No.	Title	Length
1.	"Down on My Knees" (writers: Ogunmakin, George Brenner)	4:01
2.	"Without You"	3:57
3.	"Letter by Letter"	3:13
4.	"How Many Times?"	3:28
5.	"And It's Supposed to Be Love" (writer: Abbey Lincoln)	4:59
6.	"Watching You"	3:53
7.	"Only You"	3:55
8.	"Help Is Coming"	3:55
9.	"These Days"	4:48
10.	"Life Is Real"	4:48
11.	"What Is Love?"	4:26
12.	"Neva Been"	4:19

== Personnel ==
Credits adapted from the liner notes of Joyful.

=== Musicians ===
- Ayọ – vocals, acoustic guitar, piano
- Larry Campbell – guitar, steel guitar, mandolin
- Brian Mitchell – Hammond B-3, accordion, harmonica, bass harmonica, piano
- Keith Christopher – bass great feel
- James Wormworth – drums
- Danny Sadownick – percussion
- Kyle Gordon – backing vocals

=== Technical ===
- Jay Newland – production, engineering
- Andy Manganello – engineering
- Geoff Rice – engineering assistance
- Mark Wilder – mastering

=== Artwork ===
- Aurélie Ullrich – art direction
- Jean-Marc Lubrano – photography
- Rapho – photography

== Charts ==
=== Weekly charts ===
Weekly chart performance for Joyful
Chart (2006–2007)	Peak position
Australian Urban Albums (ARIA)	25
Belgian Albums (Ultratop Wallonia)	35
Dutch Albums (Album Top 100)	46
European Albums (Billboard)	29
Finnish Albums (Suomen virallinen lista)	8
French Albums (SNEP)	6
German Albums (Offizielle Top 100)	40
Greek Albums (IFPI)	13
Italian Albums (FIMI)	5
Polish Albums (ZPAV)	1
Swiss Albums (Schweizer Hitparade)	35
US Heatseekers Albums (Billboard)	16
US Top R&B/Hip-Hop Albums (Billboard)	81

=== Year-end charts ===
2006 year-end chart performance for Joyful
Chart (2006)	Position
French Albums (SNEP)	24

2007 year-end chart performance for Joyful
Chart (2007)	Position
French Albums (SNEP)	27

== Certifications ==
Certifications for Joyful
Region	Certification	Certified units/sales
France (SNEP)	2× Platinum	400,000^{*}
Poland (ZPAV)	2× Platinum	40,000^{*}
Switzerland (IFPI Switzerland)	Gold	15,000^{^}
^{*} Sales figures based on certification alone.^{^} Shipments figures based on certification alone.

== Release history ==
Release history for Joyful
Region	Date	Label	Ref.
France	12 June 2006	Polydor	
Italy	1 September 2006	Universal	
Netherlands	17 November 2006	Universal	
Germany	21 November 2006	Universal	
Canada	30 January 2007	Universal	
Poland	5 March 2007	Universal	
Australia	31 March 2007	Universal	
United Kingdom	3 September 2007	Polydor	
United States	20 November 2007	Interscope	
