= Jay Newland =

American record producer, engineer & mixer

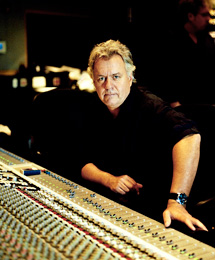
- Jay Newland in the studio

Jay Newland is an American music producer, engineer and mixer, perhaps best known for his work with Norah Jones on her 2002 debut album Come Away with Me, one of the best-selling albums of all time, with 27 million units sold worldwide to date.

== Career ==
Newland was educated at and graduated from Berklee College of Music. Newland is a twelve-time Grammy Award winner. Newland's first four Grammy awards came from his work as producer and engineer/mixer on Norah Jones' world-wide 27-million-selling album Come Away with Me (2002), including Record of the Year and Album of the Year at the 45th Annual Grammy Awards. Newland co-produced and mixed her biggest hit, "Don't Know Why", from that album, and recorded and mixed her 12-million-selling second album, Feels Like Home (2004).

Newland worked with singer Gregory Porter, recording and mixing Porter's million-selling album, Liquid Spirit (2013) and the platinum follow-up, Take Me to the Alley (2016).

Ayọ's debut album, Joyful (2007), was produced and mixed by Newland. It reached Double-Platinum status in France, Platinum in Germany and Poland, Gold status in Switzerland, Italy and Greece. Newland produced Ayọ's first two albums.

Newland co-produced the last album by Richie Havens, Nobody Left to Crown (2008), released five years before Havens' death. The album contains Havens' version of The Who's "Won't Get Fooled Again".

In addition, Newland has worked with many other artists in numerous genres, including Eric Clapton, Paul Simon, Stevie Wonder, Johnny Hallyday, Charlie Haden, Pat Metheny, Missy Higgins, Dolly Parton, Etta James, Abbey Lincoln, Tom Tom Club, Stan Getz, Lucky Peterson, Mavis Staples, Linda Thompson, Boz Scaggs, Herbie Hancock, Esperanza Spalding, James Cotton, Buddy Guy, Bo Diddley, Pinetop Perkins, Junior Wells, Sun Ra, Clarence "Gatemouth" Brown, Keith Jarrett, Taj Mahal, Eddy Mitchell, Juliette Gréco, Michel LeGrand, Randy Weston, Bobby Womack and Dizzy Gillespie.

Newland won his 11th and 12th Grammys in 2016, as recording and mix engineer on John Scofield's album Country for Old Men and engineer and mixer on Gregory Porter's Take Me To The Alley. Jay is represented by Joe D'Ambrosio of Joe D'Ambrosio Management, Inc.
