= William Baldé =

French singer-songwriter

- Born: Mohamed Guy William Baldé; 4 April 1971 (age 54); Kindia, Guinea
- Origin: Guinea
- Genres: Pop, Reggae
- Occupations: Singer, songwriter, composer
- Years active: 1995–present
- Website: Official site

Mohamed Guy William Baldé (born 4 April 1971), known as William Baldé, is a singer-songwriter and composer born in Guinea. In 2008, he released his album En corps étranger and his single "Rayon de soleil".

== Biography ==
William Baldé started his singing career with the afro soul band Yuba in which he sang in English. The group had a contract with EMI record company and released in 1995 a first album entitled Everybody Nyani. Yuba opened the concerts of Jamiroquai and The Eagles, among other artists.

The soloist career of William Baldé started in the late 2007, when he was first part of the concerts of Christophe Maé. In June 2008, he released his first album En corps étranger and the single "Rayon de soleil". This single was followed by the second one from this album, Sweet Lady.

Baldé was nominated for the 2009 NRJ Music Awards in the category 'French revelation of the year'.

== Discography ==
=== Albums ===
| Year | Title | Chart | | | Certification (FR) |
| Year | Title | FR | BEL (WA) | SWI | Certification (FR) |
|---|---|---|---|---|---|
| 2008 | En corps étranger | 3 | 31 | 84 | — |

=== Singles ===
| Year | Title | Chart | | | | Certification (FR) |
| Year | Title | FR | FR (DD) | BEL (WA) | SWI | Certification (FR) |
|---|---|---|---|---|---|---|
| 2008 | "Rayon de soleil" | 1 | 2 | 1 | 24 | — |
| 2008 | "Sweet Lady" | TBA | TBA | TBA | TBA | TBA |
