= Charts (French group) =

1990s French musical group

- Origin: Échirolles, France
- Genres: Pop; Rock
- Years active: 1989–1998
- Past members: Calogero Maurici; Gioacchino Maurici; Francis Maggiulli; Fred Mattia

Charts was a 1990s French musical group.

== History ==
This band was composed of Charly (real name Calogero Maurici), his brother Jacky (Gioacchino Maurici) and their childhood friends Francis (Francis Maggiulli) and Fred Mattia who left the group six months after its foundation. They are all from Échirolles (near Grenoble, France). The group disestablished in 1998 after the very small success of their latest album, Changer.

All members of Charts continued with solo musical careers. They also continued to co-write songs together, first, under the name of Calogero Bros. whereas later on their collaborations were signed by the listing of their individual names.

Calogero Maurici, known by his mononym Calogero, is a very well-known singer songwriter in France with a considerable charting success and fame.

== Discography ==
=== Albums ===
- L'Océan sans fond (1989)
- Notre Monde à nous (1991)
- Hannibal (1994)
- Acte 1 (1995) - #19 in France, #15 in Belgium
- Changer (1997)

=== Singles ===
- "Je ris, je pleure", 1989
- "Je m'envole", 1990 - #45 in France
- "L'océan sans fond", 1990
- "Notre monde à nous", 1992
- "Aime-moi encore", 1993 - #13 in France
- "Hautbois dormant", 1993
- "Les moustiques", 1994
- "Libre enfin", 1995
- "Je m'envole (live)", 1995 - #37 in France
- "Les Filles de l'aurore", 1995
- "Changer", 1997
- "Être humain", 1997
