= Calogero (album) =

Studio album by Calogero
- Released: February 20, 2002
- Recorded: France
- Genres: Pop rock, Chanson
- Length: 48:41
- Labels: Universal Records; Mercury

Calogero chronology
| Au Milieu des autres (2000) | Calogero (2002) | 3 (2004) |

Singles from Calogero
- 1. "Aussi libre que moi" Released: January, 2002; 2. "En apesanteur" Released: May 2002; 3. "Tien An Men" Released: January 2003; 4. "Prendre racine" Released: July 2003

Calogero is the name of the second studio album recorded by the French singer and songwriter Calogero. It was released in 2002 and achieved a great success, notably when the next album, 3, came out.

== Album information ==
After a small success of the previous album, Au Milieu des autres, Calogero decided to release a new album, with an eponymous title. For this album, Calogero composed almost all the music, while famous artists in France wrote the lyrics. Françoise Hardy, Lionel Florence and Gioacchino, Calogero's brother, participated in the writing of at least one song. A hidden track is also available after the 11th song, "L'Européen".

The album had a very long chart trajectory in the French and Belgian (Wallonia) albums charts. Indeed, the success of the next album, 3, made Calogero able to remain for respectively 104 and 94 weeks on the charts. In Belgium the album hit #2 in its second week, but in France, it reached its peak position, #3, almost two years after its release.

In France, four singles were released from this album; however, only the second one, "En Apesanteur", had success, peaking at #13 for two weeks on the French Singles Chart and hitting Gold status. The three other singles achieved a minor success : "Aussi libre que moi" reached #35, "Tien an Men" #43, and "Prendre racine" #39.

The CD was re-issued in 2003 with a second CD containing five tracks.

== Track listing ==
=== First release, 2002 ===
CD

| # | Title | Length |
|---|---|---|
| 1. | "En apesanteur" (A.Filippi / Calogero - Gioacchino) | 3:23 |
| 2. | "Aussi libre que moi" (A.Filippi / L.Florence - Calogero) | 4:24 |
| 3. | "Tien An Men" (L.Florence / Calogero - Gioacchino) | 4:48 |
| 4. | "Prouver l'amour" (P.Grillet / Calogero) | 3:12 |
| 5. | "Prendre racine" (P.Guirao / Calogero - Gioacchino) | 4:42 |
| 6. | "À la gueule des noyés" (P.Guirao / Calogero - Gioacchino) | 4:06 |
| 7. | "Une dernière chance" (F.Hardy / Calogero) | 4:47 |
| 8. | "Juste un peu de silence" (Duet with Yvette Hammond) (L.Florence - P.Guirao / Gioacchino) | 3:31 |
| 9. | "Je vis là où tu m'as laissé" (L.Florence - A.Ekpob / Calogero - Gioacchino) | 4:42 |
| 10. | "Partir ou rester" (L.Florence - P.Guirao / Calogero - Gioacchino) | 5:13 |
| 11. | "Le Plus Beau Jour" (R.Haroche / Calogero - O.Marly) | 3:57 |
| 11^{1}. | "L'Européen" (A.Filippi / Calogero) | |

^{1} Hidden track

=== Second release, 2003 ===
Additional CD

| # | Title | Length |
|---|---|---|
| 1. | "Le Plus Beau Jour" (live) (R.Haroche / Calogero - O.Marly) | 4:12 |
| 2. | "En apesanteur" (live) (A.Filippi / Calogero - Gioacchino) | 5:10 |
| 3. | "De cendres et de terre" (live) (L.Florence / Calogero - Gioacchino) | 6:25 |
| 4. | "Juste un peu de silence" (Duet with Bérénice) (L.Florence - P.Guirao / Gioacchino) | 3:48 |
| 5. | "Prendre racine" (new version) (P.Guirao / Calogero - Gioacchino) | 4:19 |

== Credits ==
=== Editions ===
- Editions Impek / Atletico Music : tracks 1, 2, 3, 9 + hidden track
- Francis Dreyfus Music (cat. Silex) : track 4
- Editions Impek / Atletico Music / Sony ATV Music Publishing : track 5, 6, 8, 10
- Editions Kundali / Editions Impek : track 7
- Editions Impek / Atletico Music / Editions Françaises : track 11

=== Personnel ===
- Produced by Pierre Jaconelli
- Guitars : Pierre Jaconelli, Olivier Marly and Michel Aymé
- Bass : Calogero
- Drum kit : Magnus Perrson
- Keyboards, programmations and piano : Jean-Pierre Pilot

Except : "Tien An Men" : Yannick Fonderie

- Background vocals on "Prouver l'amour" : Yvette Hammond
- Arrangements and strings direction :
  - "Aussi libre que moi" : Olivier Schultheis
  - "Tien An Men" and "À la gueule des noyés" : Stanislas Renoult
- Recorded by Erwin Autrique at studio ICP
- Mixed by Pete Schwier, assisted by Jean-Paul Gonnot, at studio Plus XXX

Except : "Aussi libre que moi" : Erwin Autrique at studio ICP

- Preproduction : Jean-Pierre Pilot, Calogero and Pierre Jaconelli
- Mastering : Miles Showell, at Metropolis Studio
- Artistic direction : Caroline Molko
- Executive producer : Sandrine Lebars
- Photos : Kate Barry
- Design : Agnès B. / l'Eclaireur
- Artwork : Autrement le design

== Charts ==
=== Weekly charts ===
| Chart (2002/03) | Peak position |
|---|---|
| Belgian (Wallonia) Albums Chart | 2 |
| Belgian (Wallonia) Mid Price Chart | 4 |
| French Albums Chart | 3 |
| Swiss Albums Chart | 26 |

=== Year-end charts ===
| Chart (2002) | Position |
|---|---|
| Belgian (Wallonia) Albums Chart | 18 |
| French Albums Chart | 51 |
| Chart (2003) | Position |
| Belgian (Wallonia) Albums Chart | 20 |
| French Albums Chart | 8 |

== Certifications ==
| Country | Certification | Date | Sales certified | Physical sales |
|---|---|---|---|---|
| Belgium | 2 x Platinum | 26 March 2010 | 100,000 | |
| France | Diamond | 2004 | 1,000,000 | 978,000 |
| Switzerland | Gold | 2004 | 20,000 | |
