= Calogero (singer) =

French singer (born 1971)

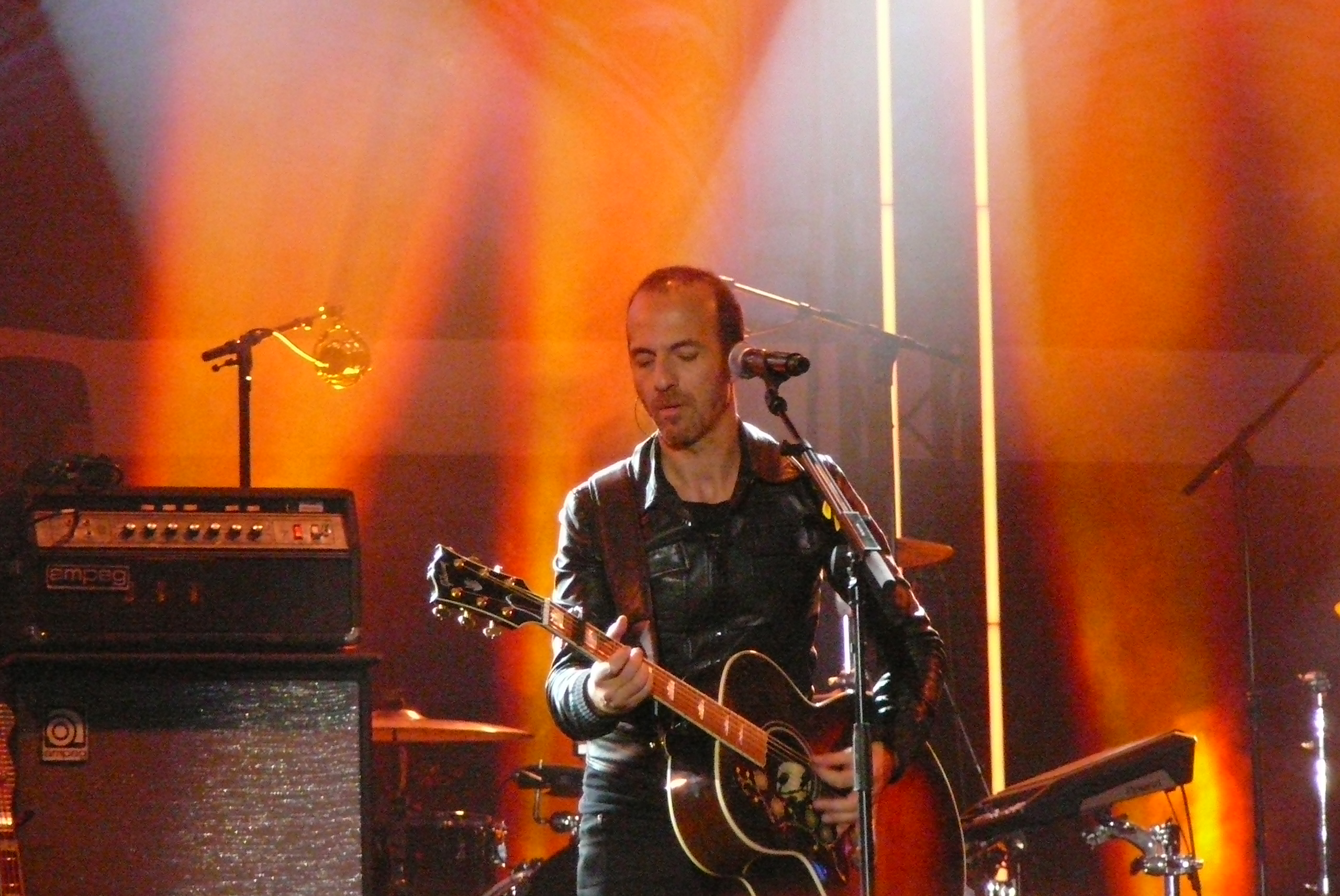
- Calogero performing live in Brussels in 2014

Background information
- Also known as: Calogero
- Born: Calogero Joseph Salvatore Maurici; 30 July 1971 (age 55); Échirolles, Isère, France
- Origin: Échirolles, France
- Occupations: Singer, songwriter
- Instrument: Bass guitar
- Years active: 1989–present
- Label: Mercury Records
- Member of: Circus (2012–present)
- Formerly of: Les Charts (1989–1998)

Calogero Joseph Salvatore Maurici (born 30 July 1971), known mononymously as Calogero (French: [kalɔʒɛʁo]; Italian: [kaˈlɔːdʒero]), is a French singer.

== Early life ==
Calogero was born in Échirolles, Isère, to Sicilian-born Italian parents from Sommatino, Caltanissetta, Sicily.

== Early years ==
By the age of six, Calogero had already taken an interest in music. He quickly learned to play several instruments, including the flute, piano, and bass

== As part of Les Charts ==
In 1986 he became the lead singer and songwriter for a band called Les Charts he started with his brother, Gioacchino Maurici, and a childhood friend, Francis Maggiulli. Between 1989 and 1997, Les Charts released five albums, L'Océan sans fond (1989), Notre monde à nous (1991), Hannibal (1994), Acte 1 (1995), their most successful charting album, and Changer (1997).

== Solo career ==
As the band began to lose its momentum, Calogero decided to launch himself as a solo artist and gathered important connections by writing songs and collaborating with already popular artists such as Zazie and Pascal Obispo. The latter helped produce Calogero's first solo album Au milieu des Autres (2000). His second album, Calogero (2002), was a huge success, with the hit singles "En apesanteur" (In Weightlessness), "Aussi libre que moi" (As Free as Me), "Tien an men" and "Prendre racine" (To Take Root). Finally, in 2004, Calogero released 3, featuring "Face à la mer", a duet with French rapper Passi, and several other top singles, such as "Yalla" and "Si seulement je pouvais lui manquer" (If Only He Could Miss Me).

Calogero released his fourth studio album Pomme C on 12 March 2007.

== Collaborations as composer ==
Since the late 1990s, Calogero composed songs for many artists, often in collaboration with his brother Gioacchino. For example, he composed songs for Florent Pagny ("Châtelet-les-Halles"), Hélène Ségara ("Au Nom d'une Femme" and "Regarde"), Ismael Lo ("L'Amour a tous les droits" and "Faut qu'on s'aime"), Pascal Obispo ("Millésime"), Jenifer ("C'est de l'or"), Julie Zenatti ("La Vérité m'attire" et "Toutes les douleurs"), Patrick Fiori ("Que tu reviennes", "Être là", "Encore", "Tout le monde", "Tera umana" et "Il n'y a pas grand chose à dire"), Fred Blondin ("Je manque de toi" and "Perso et les Aimants"), Mario Barravecchia ("On se ressemble"). He also composed three songs for the musical The Ten Commandments: "Je n'avais jamais prié", "Une Raison d'espérer" and "Y'a tant d'amour".

Calogero also participates in numerous charities. He is currently member of Les Enfoirés; he also participated in the single "Noël ensemble", recorded by many artists in 2002; he sang for the Sidaction with Jenifer; and recently, he participated in the single "Douce France", led by Marc Lavoine, to fight discrimination and help young people to find work.

In 2008, Stanislas Renoult recorded a duet with Calogero entitled "La Débâcle des sentiments".

== Musical style ==
Calogero describes his own musical style as "pop rock". He also said that he listens to the musical work of various artists, such as Barbara, William Sheller, The Cure and The Who, and that "words and melodies are very important to [him]".

He has a great admiration for the Beatles, especially for Paul McCartney, whose song "Live and Let Die" is covered on Live 1.0. Calogero said about McCartney, "Paul McCartney? A myth [legend]! For all bassists he is Uncle Paul". Between his first solo album and his last tour, the musical style evolved significantly to a more percussive rock, and he also said that his fourth album, Pomme C, had the closest sound to him.

Calogero is a bass player but he also plays keyboards and guitar. His initial musical training was on the organ. On his first solo album, he plays the guitar, while on the next two he plays bass. He is left handed and sings about this in the song "Conduire en Angleterre".

== In Circus ==
Starting 2012, the French band Circus was established that included Calogero as well as Stanislas, Philippe Uminski, Elsa Fourlon and Karen Brunon, all already established artists. Their debut self-titled album Circus was released in 2012.

== Discography ==
=== Studio albums ===
- Au milieu des autres (2000)
- Calogero (2002)
- 3 (2004)
- Pomme C (2007)
- L'Embellie (2009)
- Les feux d'artifice (2014)
- Liberté chérie (2017)
- Centre Ville (2020)
- A.M.O.U.R. (2023)
- X (2024)

=== Live albums ===
- Live 1.0 (2005)
- Live symphonique (2011)
- Live 2015 (2015)

=== Compilation albums ===
- V.O.-V.S. (2010)

Preceded by Renaud	Victoires de la Musique; Male group or artist of the year 2004	Succeeded by -M-
