= List of Ultratop 40 number-one singles of 2007 =

This is a list of songs that topped the Belgian Walloon (francophone) Ultratop 40 in 2007.

Issue Date	Artist	Song
January 6	Fatal Bazooka	Fous ta cagoule
January 13	Fatal Bazooka	Fous ta cagoule
January 20	Fatal Bazooka	Fous ta cagoule
January 27	Fatal Bazooka	Fous ta cagoule
February 3	Fatal Bazooka	Fous ta cagoule
February 10	Fatal Bazooka	Fous ta cagoule
February 17	Fatal Bazooka	Fous ta cagoule
February 24	Faf Larage	Pas le temps
March 3	Faf Larage	Pas le temps
March 10	Faf Larage	Pas le temps
March 17	Faf Larage	Pas le temps
March 24	Faf Larage	Pas le temps
March 31	Fatal Bazooka featuring Vitoo	Mauvaise foi nocturne
April 7	Fatal Bazooka featuring Vitoo	Mauvaise foi nocturne
April 14	Fatal Bazooka featuring Vitoo	Mauvaise foi nocturne
April 21	Fatal Bazooka featuring Vitoo	Mauvaise foi nocturne
April 28	Fatal Bazooka featuring Vitoo	Mauvaise foi nocturne
May 5	Mika	Grace Kelly
May 12	Mika	Grace Kelly
May 19	Mika	Grace Kelly
May 26	Mika	Grace Kelly
June 2	Mika	Grace Kelly
June 9	Mika	Grace Kelly
June 16	Mika	Grace Kelly
June 23	Mika	Grace Kelly
June 30	Grégory Lemarchal	De temps en temps
July 7	Christophe Willem	Double Je
July 14	Christophe Willem	Double Je
July 21	Christophe Willem	Double Je
July 28	Mika	Relax, Take It Easy
August 4	Mika	Relax, Take It Easy
August 11	Mika	Relax, Take It Easy
August 18	Mika	Relax, Take It Easy
August 25	Mika	Relax, Take It Easy
September 1	Mika	Relax, Take It Easy
September 8	Mika	Relax, Take It Easy
September 15	Julien Doré	Moi... Lolita
September 22	Julien Doré	Moi... Lolita
September 29	Julien Doré	Moi... Lolita
October 6	Julien Doré	Moi... Lolita
October 13	James Blunt	1973
October 20	James Blunt	1973
October 27	Koxie	Garçon
November 3	Koxie	Garçon
November 10	Koxie	Garçon
November 17	Koxie	Garçon
November 24	Koxie	Garçon
December 1	Christophe Willem	Jacques a dit
December 8	Koxie	Garçon
December 15	Koxie	Garçon
December 22	Rihanna	Don't Stop the Music
December 29	Rihanna	Don't Stop the Music

== Best-Selling Singles ==
This is the ten best-selling/performing singles in 2007.

Pos.	Artist	Title	HP	Weeks
1	Mika	"Grace Kelly"	1	40
2	Fatal Bazooka	"Fous ta cagoule"	1	30
3	Mika	"Relax, Take it Easy"	1	34
4	Christophe Willem	"Double Je"	1	32
5	Faf Larage	"Pas le temps"	1	24
6	Fatal Bazooka featuring Vitoo	"Mauvaise Foi Nocturne"	1	26
7	Kamini	"Marly Gomont"	2	27
8	Alex Gaudino featuring Crystal Waters	"Destination Calabria"	2	27
9	Grégory Lemarchal	"De temps en temps"	1	20
10	Rihanna featuring Jay-Z	"Umbrella"	3	29

== See also ==
- Ultratop 50 number-one hits of 2007
- 2007 in music
