= 2008 NRJ Music Awards =

The 9th NRJ Music Awards took place in Cannes, France, on January 26, 2008.

== Nominees/winners ==
=== Francophone Revelation of the Year ===
- Christophe Willem
- Justice
- Melissa M
- Vitaa
- Yael Naïm

=== International Revelation of the Year ===
- Amy Winehouse
- Fall Out Boy
- MIKA
- Plain White T's
- Sean Kingston

=== Francophone Female Artist of the Year ===
- Amel Bent
- Céline Dion
- Jenifer
- Shy'm
- Zazie

=== International Female Artist of the Year ===
- Alicia Keys
- Avril Lavigne
- Fergie
- Nelly Furtado
- Rihanna

=== Francophone Male Artist of the Year ===
- Calogero
- Christophe Maé
- David Guetta
- Emmanuel Moire
- MC Solaar

=== International Male Artist of the Year ===
- Akon
- James Blunt
- Juanes
- Justin Timberlake
- Timbaland

=== Francophone Group/Duo of the Year ===
- Diams / Vitaa
- Fatal Bazooka
- I Am
- Magic System
- Superbus

=== International Group/Duo of the Year ===
- 50 Cent / Justin Timberlake
- Linkin Park
- Maroon 5
- P.Diddy / Keyshia Cole
- Tokio Hotel

=== International Song of the Year ===
- James Blunt - "1973"
- Mika - "Relax, Take It Easy"
- Rihanna - "Don't Stop the Music"
- Sean Kingston - "Beautiful Girls"
- Timbaland - "The Way I Are"

=== Francophone Album of the Year ===
- Bob Sinclar - Soundz of Freedom
- Christophe Maé - Mon Paradis
- Christophe Willem - Inventaire
- David Guetta - Pop Life
- Vanessa Paradis - Divine Idylle

=== International Album of the Year ===
- Amy Winehouse - Back to Black
- Britney Spears - Blackout
- James Blunt - All the Lost Souls
- Mika - Life in Cartoon Motion
- Rihanna - Good Girl Gone Bad

=== Music Video of the Year ===
- 50 Cent and Justin Timberlake - "Ayo Technology"
- Calogero - "Pomme C"
- Fatal Bazooka - "Parle à ma main"
- Justice - "D.A.N.C.E."
- Mika - "Relax, Take It Easy"
