= Wakafrika =

Studio album by Manu Dibango
- Released: 1994
- Label: Giant

Manu Dibango chronology
Bao Bao (1992)	Wakafrika (1994)	Lamastabastani (1995)

Wakafrika is a studio album by Cameroonian (African) saxophonist Manu Dibango, released in 1994 by Giant Records.

It features contributions from musicians Peter Gabriel, Papa Wemba and Ladysmith Black Mambazo, King Sunny Adé, and Youssou N'Dour.

== Critical reception ==
Professional ratings
Review scores
Source	Rating
AllMusic	2/5 stars
The Village Voice	(2-star Honorable Mention)

Alex Henderson of AllMusic called the album "an all-star cast" which "isn't the all-out masterpiece it should have been". Although he praised several of the singles, stating that "there's a lot that's enjoyable on this CD" and favorably reviewed the cover of "Soul Makossa". Eugene Bowen of The Michigan Daily stated that it "isn't a bad CD" and praised the cover art but criticized some of the singles' lyricism. Robert Christgau, writing for his "Consumer Guide" column in The Village Voice, called the album "all your Afropop faves, with extra added attractions".

Jim Washburn, writing for the Los Angeles Times, praised the album's cover art and singles, stating that "while the CD inside doesn’t quite encompass the entire continent, it isn’t for want of trying, and the result is one of the most adventurous musical atlases you’re likely to find this year." He praised the covers of "Soul Makossa" and Peter Gabriel's "Biko", calling the latter "sanguine". Additionally, Wahsburn praised the contributions, noting that "Dibango seems happy to play in the shadow of his guests, but when he steps forward there’s some heated blowing."

== Charts ==
Chart (1994)	Peak position
US Top World Music Albums (Billboard)	7
