= Quelle chance/September =

Single by Christophe Willem

from the album Inventaire
- B-side: "September"
- Released: April 2008
- Recorded: 2007
- Genre: Pop
- Length: 4:15
- Label: Columbia
- Songwriter(s): Zazie, Jean-Pierre Pilot, Olivier Schultheis

Christophe Willem singles chronology
"Jacques a dit" (2007)	"Quelle chance/September" (2008)	"Berlin" (2009)

"Quelle chance/September" is a 2007 song recorded by French singer Christophe Willem. It was the fourth and last single from his album Inventaire and was released in April 2008. It was a top ten hit in France, starting at a peak of number nine on 12 April, and staying on the chart (top 100) for twenty weeks. Despite this, the song was significantly less successful in comparison with Willem's previous two hit singles.

== Track listings ==
CD maxi

No.	Title	Length
1.	"Quelle chance" ("6 Mondini" remix)	3:19
2.	"September" (radio edit mix by Antoine Clamaran and Eric Kaufmann)	3:10
3.	"September" (album version)	3:56
4.	"Heartbreaker" (album version)	3:53

== Charts ==
Chart (2008)	Peak position
Belgian (Wallonia) Singles Chart	24
French SNEP Singles Chart	9

== Sales ==
Country	Physical sales	Download sales
France	15,070	1,470
