= Don't Stop the Music (Rihanna song) =

2007 single by Rihanna

Single by Rihanna

from the album Good Girl Gone Bad
- Released: September 7, 2007
- Recorded: 2007
- Studio: Battery, New York City; Westlake Recording, Los Angeles
- Genre: Dance-pop
- Length: 4:27 (album version); 4:09 (radio edit); 3:55 (video mix)
- Label: Def Jam; SRP
- Songwriters: Tor Erik Hermansen; Mikkel S. Eriksen; Tawanna Dabney; Michael Jackson (Note: Jackson received a writing credit as a result of using the line "Mama-say, mama-sa, ma-ma-ko-ssa", which can be heard on his 1983 single "Wanna Be Startin' Somethin'")
- Producer: Stargate

Rihanna singles chronology
"Hate That I Love You" (2007)	"Don't Stop the Music" (2007)	"Take a Bow" (2008)

Music video
- "Don't Stop the Music" on YouTube

"Don't Stop the Music" is a song recorded by the Barbadian singer Rihanna for her third album, Good Girl Gone Bad (2007). It was released worldwide on September 7, 2007, as the album's fourth single by Def Jam Recordings. The song was written by Tawanna Dabney and its producers Stargate. Michael Jackson also received a songwriting credit for the sampling of the line "Mama-say, mama-sa, ma-ma-koosa" from his 1983 single "Wanna Be Startin' Somethin'". Both Rihanna and Jackson were sued by Cameroonian musician Manu Dibango, who asserted that the hook originated in his 1972 song "Soul Makossa". "Don't Stop the Music" is a dance-pop track that features rhythmic devices used primarily in hip hop music.

Many music journalists praised the sampling of the "Mama-say, mama-sa, ma-ma-ko-ssa" hook. The song received a number of accolades, including a Grammy Award nomination for Best Dance Recording. "Don't Stop the Music" reached number one in ten countries, including Australia, France, Germany, and Switzerland. In the UK, it reached number four on the UK Singles Chart and was certified triple platinum by the British Phonographic Industry (BPI). The single peaked at number three on the US Billboard Hot 100 and number one on the US Billboard Dance Club Songs charts. Certified sextuple platinum by the Recording Industry Association of America (RIAA), as of 2015, it has sold more than 3.7 million copies in the US.

Anthony Mandler filmed the song's music video in Prague. In the video, Rihanna and her friends sneak into the back of a candy store that contains a secret club, and she parties with club-goers. The singer performed "Don't Stop the Music" at the 50th Annual Grammy Awards and the NRJ Music Awards in 2008, and included it on her Good Girl Gone Bad, Last Girl on Earth, Loud and Diamonds World Tour set lists. The American Society of Composers, Authors, and Publishers (ASCAP) recognized it as one of the most-performed songs of 2009. English recording artist Jamie Cullum released a cover of the song as the second single from his 2009 album The Pursuit, and his version charted in several European countries.

== Development and release ==
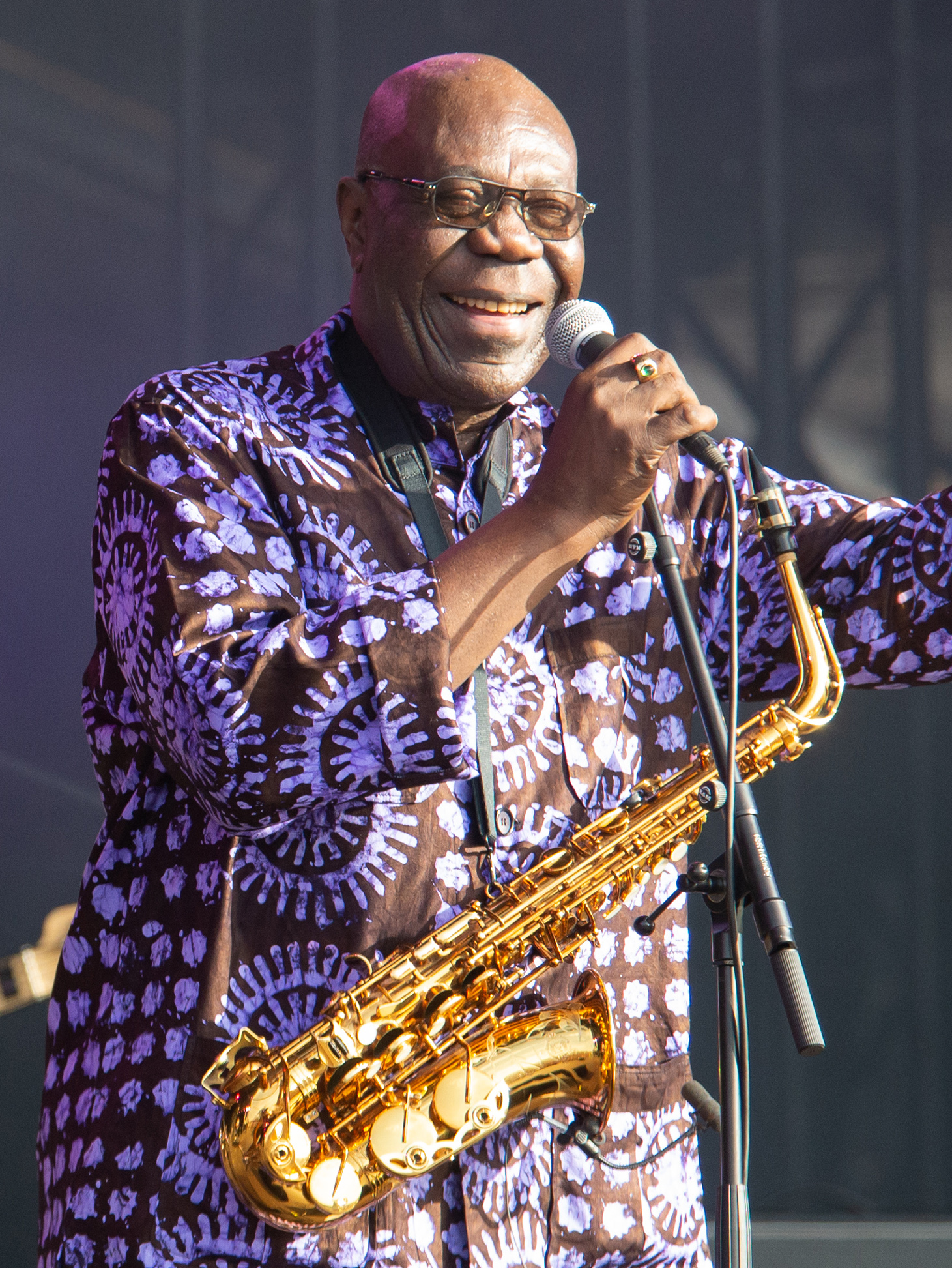
Manu Dibango sued Rihanna and Jackson for using his "Mama-say, mama-sa, ma-ma-ko-ssa" line without permission.

"Don't Stop the Music" was written and produced by the Norwegian production duo StarGate, with additional songwriting by Tawanna Dabney. Michael Jackson received a songwriting credit for the sampling of the line "Mama-say, mama-sa, ma-ma-ko-ssa" from his 1983 single "Wanna Be Startin' Somethin". Tim Sturges and Phillip Ramos provided additional production for the song. It was recorded at Battery Studios in New York City and Westlake Recording Studios in Los Angeles by Mikkel S. Eriksen and Al Hemberger. Phil Tan and Josh Houghkirk mixed the single, and StarGate provided vocal production and instrumentation.

In February 2009, Cameroonian musician Manu Dibango filed a lawsuit claiming that "Don't Stop the Music" and "Wanna Be Startin' Somethin'" used the "Mama-say, mama-sa, ma-ma-ko-ssa" hook without his permission. According to Dibango, the line is from his 1972 single "Soul Makossa". Agence France-Presse reported that Jackson admitted that he borrowed the line for "Wanna Be Startin' Somethin'" and settled out of court. When Rihanna asked Jackson in 2007 for permission to sample the line, he allegedly approved the request without contacting Dibango beforehand. Dibango's attorneys brought the case before a court in Paris, demanding €500,000 in damages and asking for Sony BMG, EMI and Warner Music to be "barred from receiving 'mama-say mama-sa'-related income until the matter is resolved". The judge ruled that Dibango's claim was inadmissible: a year earlier, a different Paris-area judge had required Universal Music to include Dibango's name in the liner notes of future French releases of "Don't Stop the Music", and at the time of this earlier court appearance, Dibango had withdrawn legal action, thereby waiving his moral right to seek further damages.

"Don't Stop the Music" was the fourth single from Rihanna's third album, Good Girl Gone Bad (2007). Before its release, two promotional remixes of the song (Solitaire's More Drama and the Wideboys Club Mix) were added to digital outlets in Canada and the United States on August 7, 2007. On September 7, an EP of the single was released via the iTunes Store in some countries including Australia, Italy, New Zealand and Spain. The EP contains the Wideboys Club Mix and instrumental and album versions of the song. That day, "Don't Stop the Music" was released as a CD single in Germany with the same material as the EP and the song's music video. The following month, it was released as a CD single in France. Def Jam Recordings provided the song to contemporary hit radio stations in the United States on January 15, 2008, and to rhythmic contemporary stations a week later. Nine remixes, including the album version of the song, were released on May 14 to digital outlets in territories including Australia, Germany, New Zealand and Spain.

== Composition ==
"Don't Stop the Music"
A 24-second sample of "Don't Stop the Music"; a syncopated song, it samples a variety of layered rhythms, with hip-hop rhythms and a heavy bass drumbeat predominating. While Rihanna sings the chorus, the Michael Jackson sample plays as the main background vocals.

"Don't Stop the Music" is a four-minute, 27-second dance-pop song, written in the key of F♯ minor in common time, with a moderate tempo of 123 beats per minute. Rihanna's voice ranges from F♯_{3} to A_{4}. The syncopated song samples a variety of layered rhythms, with hip-hop rhythms and a heavy bass drumbeat predominating. The sampled chant "Mama-say, mama-sa, ma-ma-ko-ssa" was added to the arrangement as a complementary throbbing motif, becoming the main background vocals.

Sal Cinquemani of Slant Magazine described "Don't Stop the Music" as having a bouncy feel similar to Rihanna's 2006 single "SOS". According to Fraser McAlpine of the BBC's Chart Blog, Rihanna's vocals on the song sound as if she recorded them to a different backing track, "then gave them to some nerdy beatmatcher with an extensive collection of dark electro and classic pop." McAlpine compared the verses' vocal melody to that of Aaliyah's single "Try Again", the chorus to Madonna's "La Isla Bonita", and the base track to Eric Prydz-style trance music. After the release of Rihanna's single "Only Girl (In the World)" in 2010, many critics compared its composition and structure to "Don't Stop the Music".

== Critical reception ==
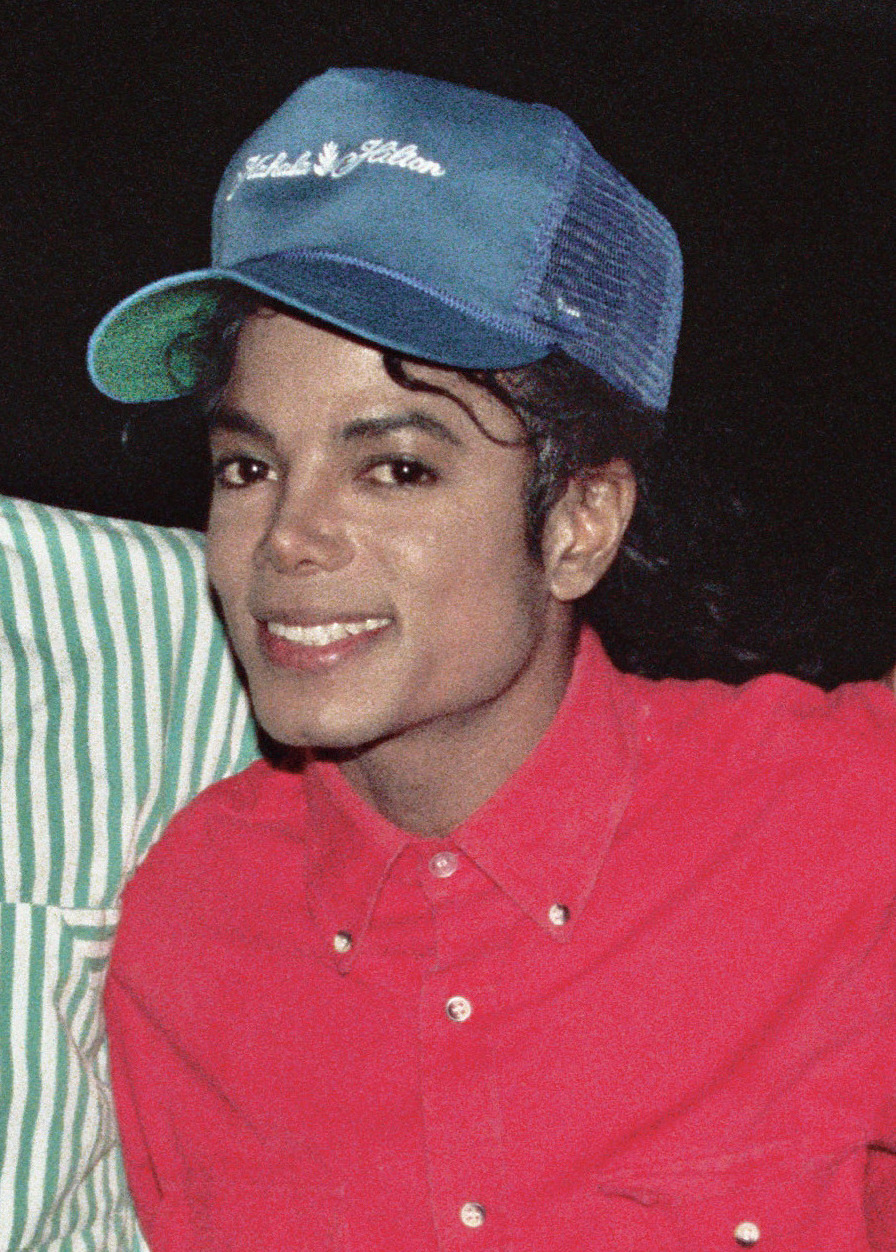
"Don't Stop the Music" was praised for incorporating the hook from Michael Jackson's single, "Wanna Be Startin' Somethin'".

Music journalists praised the sampling of the "Mama-say, mama-sa, ma-ma-ko-ssa" hook. For Pitchfork Media's Tom Breihan—who characterized "Don't Stop the Music" as "an amazing bit of euroclub insanity combined with synth and bass"—the hook from Jackson's track smoothly blends into the song's powerful beat. Nick Levine of Digital Spy called "Don't Stop the Music" "brilliant and unwitting", and said that it was the best single with a Jackson writing credit since his 1997 "Blood on the Dance Floor". PopMatters' Quentin B. Huff wrote that "the Michael Jackson-sampling 'Don't Stop the Music', inspires the type of tail feather shaking you can only produce when you're chanting, 'Mama-say, mama-sa, ma-ma-ko-ssa'".

McAlpine called Rihanna's vocals "emotionally removed, a little distant and naughty, but a smidge melancholy and tearful". According to a New York Times reviewer, in "Don't Stop the Music" Rihanna "[found] exuberance in a ... severe techno beat". In 2012, Billboard ranked the song 13th on its list of "Rihanna's 20 Biggest Billboard Hits" of all time; they wrote, "we defy you to get the hook from this pounding 2007 dancefloor favorite out of your mind."

"Don't Stop the Music" won the Best International Song award at the 2008 NRJ Music Awards. It was nominated for Single of the Year at the 2008 Teen Choice Awards, losing to the Jonas Brothers' "When You Look Me in the Eyes". The song was nominated for Best Dance Recording at the 50th Grammy Awards, losing to Justin Timberlake's "LoveStoned/I Think She Knows". At the 2009 Kids' Choice Awards "Don't Stop the Music" was nominated for Favorite Song, losing to Beyoncé's "Single Ladies (Put a Ring on It)". At the American Society of Composers, Authors and Publishers Pop Music Awards, ASCAP recognized it as one of 2009's most-performed songs. "Don't Stop the Music" was a winning song at the 2009 BMI Pop Awards. In 2014, David Drake of the magazine Complex called the single "one of the earliest shots fired in the mainstreaming of dance music" compared with typical 2007 top-forty fare.

== Commercial performance ==
"Don't Stop the Music" debuted at number 94 on the US Billboard Hot 100 chart in the issue dated December 8, 2007, and peaked at number three on February 16, 2008, becoming Rihanna's fourth top-three single. It topped the US Dance Club Songs chart (Rihanna's sixth number-one single), reached number two on the Pop Songs chart and number 74 on the Hot R&B/Hip Hop Songs chart. "Don't Stop the Music" had sold 3.7 million digital copies in the US as of June 2015 and was certified six-times platinum by the Recording Industry Association of America (RIAA) in May 2022. The song reached number two on the Canadian Hot 100, remaining on the chart for a total of 52 weeks. It was Rihanna's second song to reach the chart's top three, following "Umbrella".

In Australia, "Don't Stop the Music" debuted at number 22 on February 3, 2008. After three weeks, on February 24, the song peaked at number one and remained there for four weeks. It was Rihanna's third number-one single in the country, after "SOS" and "Umbrella", remaining on the chart for 27 weeks. "Don't Stop the Music" charted at number 12 on the 2008 year-end Australian Singles Chart. In 2026, the song was certified 12× Platinum by the Australian Recording Industry Association (ARIA) for 840,000 equivalent units. The single debuted at number 31 in New Zealand on December 10, 2007. After fluctuating for four weeks, it peaked at number three for a week and spent a total of 22 weeks on the chart. "Don't Stop the Music" was certified platinum by the Recording Industry Association of New Zealand (RIANZ) in April 2008 for sales of over 15,000 digital copies.

In the United Kingdom, the song debuted at number 68 on December 15, 2007. After seven weeks on the chart, it peaked at number four. In October 2025, the song was certified triple-platinum by the British Phonographic Industry (BPI) for sales and streams of over 1,800,000 units. The single was 24 on the 2008 year-end UK Singles Chart. "Don't Stop the Music" debuted atop the French Singles Chart on October 27, 2007, Rihanna's first number-one single on the chart, as well as her first number-one debut. Remaining at number one for two weeks, the song spent a total of 36 weeks on the chart. On the German Singles Chart, it debuted at number two on September 24, 2007. After two weeks, it reached number one, staying there for two consecutive weeks. "Don't Stop the Music" was certified five times gold by the Bundesverband Musikindustrie for sales/streams of over 750,000 units. It was successful on the Swiss Singles Chart, peaking at number one for five weeks. The song reached number one in Austria, Flanders and Wallonia in Belgium, Hungary and the Netherlands.

== Music video ==
The song's music video was directed by Rihanna's regular director, Anthony Mandler, in May 2007 and filmed in a nightclub in Prague, the Czech Republic. The video was digitally released on iTunes on July 26, 2007.

In the video, Rihanna and two friends get out of a yellow taxi in Bělehradská 120, Prague to go at a nightclub and they enter a candy store where a boy is standing with his mother. Rihanna tells the boy not to tell anyone where they are going, and the singer and her friends sneak into the back of the store (where there is a secret nightclub entrance). The narrative is intercut with Rihanna singing the song against a wall and dancing in the club. After she enters the club, she checks her makeup in a restroom as she sings.

Rihanna returns to the dance floor for the chorus, dancing and singing with her friends. Her fellow club-goers clap along with the sample from "Wanna Be Startin' Somethin'". VH1's Christopher Rosa ranked the video 18th on his list of Rihanna's 20 sexiest videos: "This dance-by-numbers song gets a facelift with its brisk, energetic video featuring R as the undisputed queen of the clubs".

It was the final music video played on the UK MTV Club when it shut down on December 31, 2025.

== Live performances ==
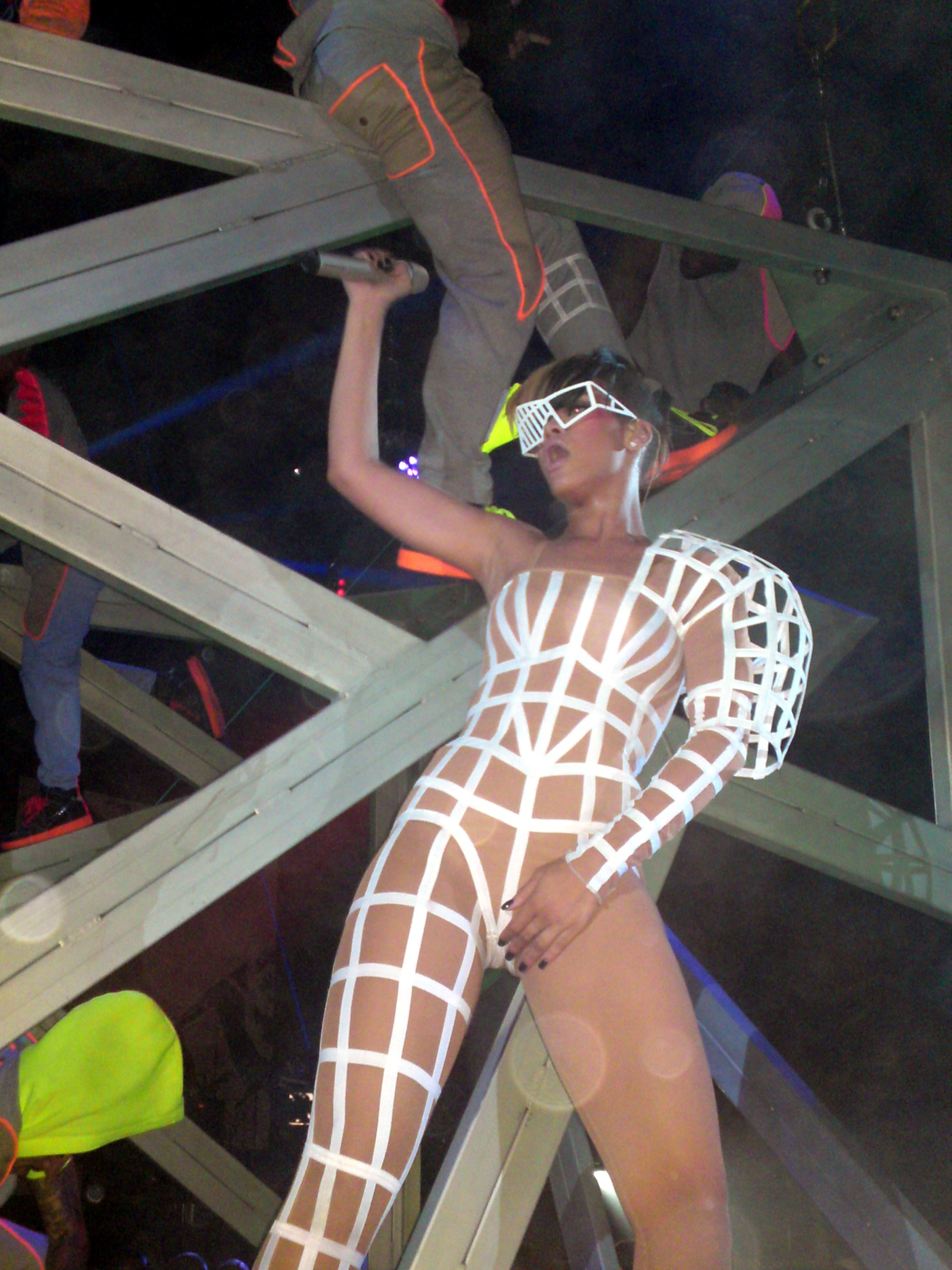
Performing "Don't Stop the Music" in Zurich during Rihanna's 2010 Last Girl on Earth Tour

"Don't Stop the Music" was the 14th song on the set list of Rihanna's 2007–2009 Good Girl Gone Bad Tour, her first world tour. The singer's performance in Manchester was released in the United Kingdom through iTunes, and is featured on the Good Girl Gone Bad Live DVD. Rihanna performed "Don't Stop the Music" at the 2008 NRJ Music Awards in Cannes on January 26, 2008. She sang the song at the 50th Grammy Awards on February 10, 2008, as half of a medley with "Umbrella" with American funk band The Time. On June 20, 2008, Rihanna was a guest on NBC's Today Show in Rockefeller Center in New York City, performing "Don't Stop the Music", "Umbrella" and "Take a Bow".

After the 2009 United Kingdom release of her fourth album, Rated R, Rihanna gave a Nokia promotional concert at the Brixton Academy in London. She performed songs from the new album, including "Russian Roulette", "Wait Your Turn" and "Hard" (the last of these sung with Young Jeezy). Rihanna also performed "Don't Stop the Music" and other previously released songs, including "Disturbia", "Unfaithful" and "Take a Bow". On December 4, 2009, the singer performed on The Release, MySpace Music's urban music concert series. Rihanna performed her new material, mashed up with older songs including "Don't Stop the Music", "Live Your Life" and "Run This Town", against a background of stacked vintage televisions and silver mannequins.

On February 1, 2010, Rihanna performed "Don't Stop the Music" and "Hard" on The Ellen DeGeneres Show. She performed at the 2010 Kids' Choice Awards on March 27, 2010, in the Pauley Pavilion of the UCLA campus, singing "Don't Stop the Music", "Hard" and her 2010 single "Rude Boy". To promote Rated R, Rihanna embarked upon the 2010–2011 Last Girl on Earth Tour (her second worldwide tour), where she performed the song. In June 2011, Rihanna began the Loud Tour, her third major worldwide tour, where the single was twentieth on the set list. She performed "Don't Stop the Music" at Radio 1's Hackney Weekend on May 24, 2012, as the thirteenth song on the set list, with a giant onstage sphinx. The song was on the set list for Rihanna's 2013 Diamonds World Tour, where she sang it as part of a medley with "S&M" and "Only Girl (In the World)". She also performed the song at the 2016 MTV Video Music Awards in a medley with "Only Girl (In the World)", "We Found Love" and "Where Have You Been".

== Track listing and formats ==
- Promotional remix singles^{[a]}
1. "Don't Stop the Music" (Solitaire's More Drama Mix) – 8:04
2. "Don't Stop the Music" (The Wideboys Club Mix) – 6:38
- iTunes EP
1. "Don't Stop the Music" – 4:27
2. "Don't Stop the Music" (The Wideboys Club Mix) – 6:38
3. "Don't Stop the Music" (Instrumental) – 4:19
- German CD single
1. "Don't Stop the Music" – 4:27
2. "Don't Stop the Music" (The Wideboys Club Mix) – 6:38
3. "Don't Stop the Music" (Instrumental) – 4:19
4. "Don't Stop the Music" (Video) – 3:39
- Italian CD single
1. "Don't Stop the Music" (Bob Sinclar Remix) – 7:46
2. "Don't Stop the Music" (Bob Sinclar Radio Edit) – 3:27
- France / United Kingdom CD single
1. "Don't Stop the Music" – 4:27
2. "Don't Stop the Music" (The Wideboys Club Mix) – 6:38
- iTunes Remixes
1. "Don't Stop The Music" (Album Version) – 4:29
2. "Don't Stop The Music" (Jody den Broeder Radio Edit) – 4:22
3. "Don't Stop The Music" (The Wideboys Radio Edit) – 3:11
4. "Don't Stop The Music" (Solitaire's More Drama Edit) – 4:08
5. "Don't Stop The Music" (Jody den Broeder Big Room Mix) – 10:33
6. "Don't Stop The Music" (The Wideboys Club Mix) – 6:39
7. "Don't Stop The Music" (Solitaire's More Drama Remix) – 8:08
8. "Don't Stop The Music" (Jody den Broeder Big Room Dub) – 8:34
9. "Don't Stop The Music" (The Wideboys Dub Mix) – 6:44
10. "Don't Stop The Music" (Solitaire's More Drama Dub) – 7:38

Notes

- a Released as separate digital singles in both United States and Canada via iTunes.

== Credits and personnel ==
=== Recording ===
- Recorded at Battery Studios, New York City and Westlake Recording Studios, Los Angeles, California.

=== Personnel ===
- Songwriting – Mikkel S. Eriksen, Tor Erik Hermansen, Tawanna Dabney, Michael Jackson
- Production – StarGate
- Production Assistant – Tim Sturges, Phillip Ramos
- Vocal production – StarGate
- Recording – Mikkel S. Eriksen, Al Hemberger
- Mixing – Phil Tan
- Mixing Assistant – Josh Houghkirk
- Instruments – Mikkel S. Eriksen, Tor Erik Hermansen

Credits adapted from the liner notes of Good Girl Gone Bad (Def Jam Recordings, SRP Records).

== Charts ==
=== Weekly charts ===
Weekly chart performance
Chart (2007–2008)	Peak position
Australia (ARIA)	1
Australian Urban (ARIA)	1
Austria (Ö3 Austria Top 40)	1
Belgium (Ultratop 50 Flanders)	1
Belgium (Ultratop 50 Wallonia)	1
Canada Hot 100 (Billboard)	2
CIS Airplay (TopHit)	4
Czech Republic Airplay (ČNS IFPI)	2
Denmark (Tracklisten)	4
Europe (Eurochart Hot 100)	1
Finland (Suomen virallinen lista)	3
France (SNEP)	1
Germany (GfK)	1
Hungary (Dance Top 40)	1
Hungary (Rádiós Top 40)	1
Hungary (Single Top 40)	6
Ireland (IRMA)	6
Italy (FIMI)	2
Mexico Anglo (Monitor Latino)	3
Netherlands (Dutch Top 40)	1
Netherlands (Single Top 100)	1
New Zealand (Recorded Music NZ)	3
Norway (VG-lista)	7
Portugal (Billboard)	5
Romania (Romanian Top 100)	7
Russia Airplay (TopHit)	3
Slovakia Airplay (ČNS IFPI)	2
Spain (PROMUSICAE)	1
Sweden (Sverigetopplistan)	6
Switzerland (Schweizer Hitparade)	1
Turkey (Billboard)	1
UK Singles (Official Charts)	4
UK Hip Hop/R&B (Official Charts)	1
US Billboard Hot 100	3
US Adult Pop Airplay (Billboard)	27
US Dance Club Songs (Billboard)	1
US Dance Airplay (Billboard)	1
US Hot R&B/Hip-Hop Songs (Billboard)	74
US Pop Airplay (Billboard)	3
US Rhythmic Airplay (Billboard)	6

2023–2026 weekly chart performance
Chart (2023–2026)	Peak position
Canadian Digital Song Sales (Billboard)	28
Czech Republic Singles Digital (ČNS IFPI)	59
Global 200 (Billboard)	74
Greece International (IFPI)	19
Poland (Polish Airplay Top 100)	62
Poland (Polish Streaming Top 100)	75
Portugal (AFP)	169
Romania Airplay (TopHit)	80
Slovakia Singles Digital (ČNS IFPI)	37
US Digital Song Sales (Billboard)	21
US Hot Dance/Electronic Songs (Billboard)	7

=== Year-end charts ===
2007 year-end chart performance
Chart (2007)	Position
Austria (Ö3 Austria Top 40)	15
Belgium (Ultratop 50 Flanders)	14
Belgium (Ultratop 50 Wallonia)	39
CIS (TopHit)	113
Europe (Eurochart Hot 100)	16
France (SNEP)	12
Germany (Media Control GfK)	12
Hungary (Dance Top 40)	35
Netherlands (Dutch Top 40)	48
Netherlands (Single Top 100)	54
Russia Airplay (TopHit)	96
Switzerland (Schweizer Hitparade)	10
US Dance Club Play (Billboard)	6
US Hot Dance Airplay (Billboard)	11

2008 year-end chart performance
Chart (2008)	Position
Australia (ARIA)	12
Belgium (Ultratop 50 Flanders)	4
Belgium (Ultratop 50 Wallonia)	2
Brazil (Crowley)	2
Canada (Canadian Hot 100)	10
Canada CHR/Top 40 (Billboard)	12
Canada Hot AC (Billboard)	11
CIS (TopHit)	42
Europe (Eurochart Hot 100)	6
France (SNEP)	65
Germany (Media Control GfK)	38
Hungary (Dance Top 40)	10
Hungary (Rádiós Top 40)	9
Netherlands (Dutch Top 40)	39
Netherlands (Single Top 100)	28
Russia Airplay (TopHit)	41
Spain (PROMUSICAE)	1
Sweden (Sverigetopplistan)	39
Switzerland (Schweizer Hitparade)	20
UK Singles (OCC)	24
US Billboard Hot 100	17
US Mainstream Top 40 (Billboard)	21
US Rhythmic Airplay (Billboard)	37

2023 year-end chart performance
Chart (2023)	Position
US Hot Dance/Electronic Songs (Billboard)	74

2025 year-end chart performance
Chart (2025)	Position
Romania Airplay (TopHit)	191

=== Decade-end charts ===
Decade-end chart performance
Chart (2000–2009)	Position
Australia (ARIA)	60
CIS Airplay (TopHit)	42
Russia Airplay (TopHit)	53

=== All-time charts ===
All-time chart performance
Chart	Position
Belgium (Ultratop Flanders)	37

== Certifications and sales ==
Certifications and sales
Region	Certification	Certified units/sales
Australia (ARIA)	12× Platinum	840,000^{‡}
Belgium (BRMA)	Platinum	50,000^{*}
Brazil (Pro-Música Brasil)	Diamond	250,000^{‡}
Canada Digital downloads	—	146,000
Denmark (IFPI Danmark)	2× Platinum	180,000^{‡}
Finland (Musiikkituottajat)	Gold	6,194
France	—	210,000
Germany (BVMI)	5× Gold	750,000^{‡}
Italy	—	105,000
Italy (FIMI) (since 2010)	Platinum	100,000^{‡}
New Zealand (RMNZ)	5× Platinum	150,000^{‡}
Spain (Promusicae)	6× Platinum	120,000^{*}
Sweden (GLF)	Platinum	20,000^{‡}
United Kingdom (BPI)	3× Platinum	1,800,000^{‡}
United States (RIAA)	6× Platinum	6,000,000^{‡}
Streaming
Greece (IFPI Greece)	2× Platinum	4,000,000^{†}
^{*} Sales figures based on certification alone.^{‡} Sales+streaming figures based on certification alone.^{†} Streaming-only figures based on certification alone.

== Release history ==
Release dates and formats
Region	Date	Format	Version(s)	Label	Ref.
Canada	August 7, 2007	Digital download	Solitaire's more drama remix	Island Def Jam	
Canada	August 7, 2007	Digital download	The Wideboys club mix	Island Def Jam	
United States	August 7, 2007	Digital download	Solitaire's more drama remix	Island Def Jam	
United States	August 7, 2007	Digital download	The Wideboys club mix	Island Def Jam	
Australia	September 7, 2007	Digital download	Original; the Wideboys club mix; instrumental	Island Def Jam	
Austria	September 7, 2007	Digital download	Original; the Wideboys club mix; instrumental	Island Def Jam	
Germany	September 7, 2007	CD	Original; the Wideboys club mix; instrumental	Def Jam	
Germany	September 7, 2007	Digital download	Original; the Wideboys club mix; instrumental	Island Def Jam	
Italy	September 7, 2007	Digital download	Original; the Wideboys club mix; instrumental	Island Def Jam	
Netherlands	September 7, 2007	Digital download	Original; the Wideboys club mix; instrumental	Island Def Jam	
New Zealand	September 7, 2007	Digital download	Original; the Wideboys club mix; instrumental	Island Def Jam	
Norway	September 7, 2007	Digital download	Original; the Wideboys club mix; instrumental	Island Def Jam	
Spain	September 7, 2007	Digital download	Original; the Wideboys club mix; instrumental	Island Def Jam	
France	October 22, 2007	CD	Original; the Wideboys club mix	Def Jam	
United States	January 15, 2008	Contemporary hit radio	Original	Island Def Jam	
United States	January 22, 2008	Rhythmic contemporary radio	Original	Island Def Jam	
United Kingdom	February 4, 2008	CD	Original; the Wideboys club mix	Mercury	
Australia	May 11, 2008	Digital download	Remixes	Universal	
Denmark	May 11, 2008	Digital download	Remixes	Universal	
Finland	May 11, 2008	Digital download	Remixes	Universal	
France	May 11, 2008	Digital download	Remixes	Universal	
Germany	May 11, 2008	Digital download	Remixes	Universal	
Netherlands	May 11, 2008	Digital download	Remixes	Universal	
New Zealand	May 11, 2008	Digital download	Remixes	Universal	
Norway	May 11, 2008	Digital download	Remixes	Universal	
Spain	May 11, 2008	Digital download	Remixes	Universal	

== Cover versions ==
During the sixth season of the dance reality-television series America's Best Dance Crew, the dancers Phunk Phenomenon performed a Charlie Chaplinesque music-hall version of "Don't Stop the Music". In 2011, the California indie pop duo The Bird and the Bee covered the song and posted it on SoundCloud. South Korean recording artist Hyoyeon, part of the girl group Girls' Generation, covered the song during the group's 2011 tour. Her version was included on their second live album, 2011 Girls' Generation Tour, which was released on April 11, 2013. In October 2011 Rihanna joined L.A. Reid at his home in the Hamptons to help him judge male contestants for the first season of the American version of The X Factor, where contestant Philip Lomax performed a stripped-down version of "Don't Stop the Music" for Rihanna and Reid. The song was performed by the Treblemakers in the 2012 film Pitch Perfect, and was included on its soundtrack.

=== Jamie Cullum version ===
"Don't Stop the Music"

Single by Jamie Cullum

from the album The Pursuit
- Released: January 25, 2010
- Length: 4:49
- Label: Decca; Universal
- Songwriters: Tor Erik Hermansen; Mikkel S. Eriksen; Michael Jackson
- Producer: Martin Terefe

Jamie Cullum singles chronology
"I'm All Over It" (2009)	"Don't Stop the Music" (2010)	"Wheels" (2010)

English singer and songwriter Jamie Cullum covered "Don't Stop the Music" on his 2009 album, The Pursuit. Produced by Martin Terefe, the song was digitally released as the second single from the album on January 25, 2010. Cullum's version substituted the original's electro-house groove with a "sinuous" acoustic bass and "brushed" drumming. His rendition is in the key of A minor and set in common time at 100 beats per minute, and his voice ranges from C♯_{4} to F_{5}.

According to PopMatters' Will Layman, the piano builds the groove from soft to loud (a technique used by Herbie Hancock during the 1960s). Adrian Edwards of BBC Music wrote that Cullum's version of "Don't Stop the Music" is one of the best songs on The Pursuit, and that "the novel production techniques and his broken-voiced pleading to his girl on the dance floor would blend well in any night club with strobe lighting and the clink of glasses at the bar." Cullum's version peaked at number two on the Ultratip chart in Belgium, number 28 in the Netherlands and number 58 in Germany. A music video for the song was released on December 2, 2009, on Cullum's YouTube Vevo channel.

==== Credits and personnel ====
- Production – Martin Terefe
- Mixing – Thomas Juth
- Engineer – Dyre Gormsen
- Vocals, Piano and Arrangement – Jamie Cullum
- Bass – Christopher Hill
- Drums – Brad Webb
- Electric piano – Martin Terefe

Credits adapted from the liner notes of The Pursuit (Decca Records).

==== Charts ====
Chart (2010)	Peak position
Belgium (Ultratip Bubbling Under Flanders)	2
Germany (GfK)	58
Netherlands (Dutch Top 40)	28
Netherlands (Single Top 100)	79

== See also ==
- List of number-one singles of 2008 (Australia)
- List of number-one hits of 2007 (Austria)
- List of Ultratop 50 number-one singles of 2007
- List of Ultratop 50 number-one singles of 2008
- List of Ultratop 40 number-one singles of 2007
- List of Ultratop 40 number-one singles of 2008
- List of European number-one hits of 2007
- List of number-one singles of 2007 (France)
- List of number-one hits of 2007 (Germany)
- List of Dutch Top 40 number-one singles of 2007
- List of number-one singles of the 2000s (Switzerland)
- List of number-one dance singles of 2007 (U.S.)
- List of number-one dance airplay hits of 2007 (U.S.)
- List of best-selling singles in Spain
- List of highest-certified singles in Australia
