= Caféine =

Studio album by Christophe Willem
- Released: May 25, 2009
- Recorded: 2008–2009; The Matrix Studio Complex, London; Sleeper Studios, London; Sphere Studios, London; Therapy Studios, London; Studio Low-Fi, Paris; Studio PABM, Suresnes; Studio Yellow Sub, Suresnes
- Genre: Pop, electropop
- Length: 51:56
- Language: French (main), English
- Label: Columbia, Sony Music
- Producer: Steve Anderson, Aqualung, Alexandre Azaria, Guy Chambers, Cathy Dennis, Jamie Hartman, Tina Harris, Yves Jaget, Steve Lee, Pete "Boxsta" Martin, Jean-Pierre Pilot, William Rousseau, Christophe Willem

Christophe Willem chronology
Inventaire (2007)	Caféine (2009)	Prismophonic (2011)

Singles from Caféine
- 1. "Berlin" Released: 28 March 2009; 2. "Plus que tout" Released: 7 June 2009; 3. "Heartbox" Released: December 2009; 4. "Entre nous et le sol" Released: April 2010

Professional ratings
Review scores
Source	Rating
Allmusic	4/5 stars
Artisdirect	4/5 stars
Euro Pop Music	3/5 stars
Fresh, Yesh!	(favourable)
Nessymon	(mixed)
Rate Your Music	2.5/5 stars

Caféine is the second album from French singer Christophe Willem. It was released on 25 May 2009 by Columbia. The lead single is "Berlin" and was released for download on 28 March 2009.

== Background ==
Mid-2008, Christophe Willem confirmed the recording of his second studio album, which will be released on April 16, 2009, two years to the day after his first album. Rumours say the album would have an electronic-oriented sound and produce by Minogue's producers. On October 31, Christophe-willem.com announced the possibility that the album would contain a duet with Kylie Minogue on the track called "Sensitized". The title "Caféine" was made official on February 6, 2009, but other rumours appeared. The first said Jennifer Ayache, singer from French rock-band Superbus, gave Willem a song named "Dansez". The singer will confirm the rumours later. The second is about a French adaptation from "State of Grace" by Britney Spears, a leftover song from the Blackout recording sessions. In some interviews, Willem makes his duet with Kylie Minogue known, the track is produced by Guy Chambers just like "Heartbox". It's already available on X published in 2007. However, Christophe translated into French some parts of the song. "Dansez" is finally called "Tu Te Fous De Nous" and "Entre Nous Et Le Sol" is a French adaptation of "State Of Grace"

== Track listings ==
=== Editions Standard & Deluxe Collector ===
1. "Ouverture" - 0:39
2. "L'Homme en noir" - 4:30
3. "Sensitized" duet with Kylie Minogue - 3:46
4. "Berlin" - 3:13
5. "La Demande" - 3:39
6. "Entre nous et le sol" - 3:58
7. "Plus que tout" - 4:44
8. "Coffee" - 3:40
9. "Fragile" - 3:26
10. "Trash" duet with Skye - 3:57
11. "Tu te fous de nous" - 4:35
12. "Heartbox" - 3:53
13. "Yaourt & Lavabo"
14. "Si je tombais" (Acoustic) - 4:58

=== Edition Deluxe Collector ===
1. "Holé Holé" (Original version of « L'homme En Noir ») - 4:37
2. "Berlin" (Alternative Version) - 3:08
3. "La Demande" (Remix) - 4:13
4. "Si je tombais" - 4:28
5. "Walk Away" duet with Skye 2:28

== Charts and sales ==
=== Weekly charts ===
Chart (2009)	Peak position
Belgian (Wallonia) Albums Chart	2
French Digital Chart	1
French Albums Chart	1
Swiss Albums Chart	10

=== Year-end charts ===
Chart (2009)	Position
Belgian (Wallonia) Albums Chart	33
Chart (2010)	Position
Belgian (Wallonia) Albums Chart	58

=== Certifications ===
Country	Certification	Date	Sales certified	Physical sales	Downloads
Belgium	Gold	17 July 2009	15,000		
France	Platinum	22 October 2009	100,000	300,000	
