= List of Ultratop 50 number-one singles of 2007 =

These hits topped the Ultratop 50 in 2007.

Issue Date	Artist	Song
January 6	Pink	Dear Mr. President
January 13	Pink	Dear Mr. President
January 20	Pink	Dear Mr. President
January 27	Thor!	Een tocht door het donker
February 3	Pink	Dear Mr. President
February 10	Nelly Furtado	All Good Things (Come to an End)
February 17	Nelly Furtado	All Good Things (Come to an End)
February 24	Nelly Furtado	All Good Things (Come to an End)
March 3	Fixkes	Kvraagetaan
March 10	Fixkes	Kvraagetaan
March 17	Fixkes	Kvraagetaan
March 24	Fixkes	Kvraagetaan
March 31	Fixkes	Kvraagetaan
April 7	Fixkes	Kvraagetaan
April 14	Fixkes	Kvraagetaan
April 21	Fixkes	Kvraagetaan
April 28	Fixkes	Kvraagetaan
May 5	Fixkes	Kvraagetaan
May 12	Fixkes	Kvraagetaan
May 19	Fixkes	Kvraagetaan
May 26	Fixkes	Kvraagetaan (breaking a new Belgian chart-record)
June 2	Fixkes	Kvraagetaan
June 9	Fixkes	Kvraagetaan
June 16	Laura Lynn	Dans de hele nacht met mij
June 23	Fixkes	Kvraagetaan
June 30	Rihanna featuring Jay-Z	Umbrella
July 7	Rihanna featuring Jay-Z	Umbrella
July 14	Rihanna featuring Jay-Z	Umbrella
July 21	Stan Van Samang	Scars
July 28	Mika	Relax, Take It Easy
August 4	Mika	Relax, Take It Easy
August 11	Stan Van Samang	Scars
August 18	Stan Van Samang	Scars
August 25	Stan Van Samang	Scars
September 1	Stan Van Samang	Scars
September 8	Mega Mindy	Mega Mindy Tijd
September 15	Mega Mindy	Mega Mindy Tijd
September 22	Stan Van Samang	Scars
September 29	Mega Mindy	Mega Mindy Tijd
October 6	Mega Mindy	Mega Mindy Tijd
October 13	Snow Patrol	Shut Your Eyes
October 20	Snow Patrol	Shut Your Eyes
October 27	Snow Patrol	Shut Your Eyes
November 3	Jeroen van der Boom	Jij bent zo
November 10	Jeroen van der boom	Jij bent zo
November 17	Laura Lynn & Frans Bauer	Kom dans met mij
November 24	Laura Lynn & Frans Bauer	Kom dans met mij
December 1	Laura Lynn & Frans Bauer	Kom dans met mij
December 8	Laura Lynn & Frans Bauer	Kom dans met mij
December 15	Rihanna	Don't Stop the Music
December 22	Rihanna	Don't Stop the Music
December 29	Rihanna	Don't Stop the Music

== See also ==
- Ultratop 40 number-one hits of 2007
- 2007 in music
