= List of Dutch Top 40 number-one singles of 2007 =

These hits topped the Dutch Top 40 in 2007.

Issue Date	Song	Artist(s)	Reference
6 January	"Cupido"	Jan Smit	
13 January	"Body to Body"	XYP	
20 January	"Window in the Skies"	U2	
27 January	"Window in the Skies"	U2	
3 February	"Het huis Anubis"	Nienke	
10 February	"All Good Things (Come to an End)"	Nelly Furtado	
17 February	"All Good Things (Come to an End)"	Nelly Furtado	
24 February	"Lauwe pis"	Theo Maassen	
3 March	"Lauwe pis"	Theo Maassen	
10 March	"Heartbreak Away"	Sharon Kips	
17 March	"Heartbreak Away"	Sharon Kips	
24 March	"Heartbreak Away"	Sharon Kips	
31 March	"Freefall"	Jeckyll & Hyde	
7 April	"Freefall"	Jeckyll & Hyde	
14 April	"Op weg naar geluk"	Jan Smit	
21 April	"Tranen gelachen"	Guus Meeuwis	
28 April	"Tranen gelachen"	Guus Meeuwis	
5 May	"Beautiful Liar"	Beyoncé and Shakira	
12 May	"Beautiful Liar"	Beyoncé and Shakira	
19 May	"Beautiful Liar"	Beyoncé and Shakira	
26 May	"Blijf bij mij"	André Hazes & Gerard Joling	
2 June	"Blijf bij mij"	André Hazes & Gerard Joling	
9 June	"Blijf bij mij"	André Hazes & Gerard Joling	
16 June	"Blijf bij mij"	André Hazes & Gerard Joling	
23 June	"Blijf bij mij"	André Hazes & Gerard Joling	
30 June	"Blijf bij mij"	André Hazes & Gerard Joling	
7 July	"Blijf bij mij"	André Hazes & Gerard Joling	
14 July	"Blijf bij mij"	André Hazes & Gerard Joling	
21 July	"Blijf bij mij"	André Hazes & Gerard Joling	
28 July	"Blijf bij mij"	André Hazes & Gerard Joling	
4 August	"Blijf bij mij"	André Hazes & Gerard Joling	
11 August	"Jij bent zo"	Jeroen van der Boom	
18 August	"Jij bent zo"	Jeroen van der Boom	
25 August	"Relax, Take It Easy"	Mika	
1 September	"Relax, Take It Easy"	Mika	
8 September	"Relax, Take It Easy"	Mika	
15 September	"Relax, Take It Easy"	Mika	
22 September	"Relax, Take It Easy"	Mika	
29 September	"Relax, Take It Easy"	Mika	
6 October	"Relax, Take It Easy"	Mika	
13 October	"Bedankt mijn vriend"	André Hazes & André Hazes jr.	
20 October	"Bedankt mijn vriend"	André Hazes & André Hazes jr.	
27 October	"Bedankt mijn vriend"	André Hazes & André Hazes jr.	
3 November	"Dan volg je haar benen"	Jan Smit	
10 November	"Dan volg je haar benen"	Jan Smit	
17 November	"Dan volg je haar benen"	Jan Smit	
24 November	"Dan volg je haar benen"	Jan Smit	
1 December	"Don't Stop the Music"	Rihanna	
8 December	"Don't Stop the Music"	Rihanna	
15 December	"Eén wereld"	Jeroen van der Boom	
22 December	"Eén wereld"	Jeroen van der Boom	
29 December	"Apologize"	Timbaland presents OneRepublic	

== Number-one artists ==
Position	Artist	Weeks #1
1	André Hazes	14
2	Gerard Joling	11
3	Mika	7
4	Jan Smit	6
5	Jeroen van der Boom	4
6	Sharon Kips	3
6	Beyoncé	3
6	Shakira	3
6	André Hazes jr.	3
7	U2	2
7	Nelly Furtado	2
7	Theo Maassen	2
7	Jeckyll & Hyde	2
7	Guus Meeuwis	2
7	Rihanna	2
8	XYP	1
8	Nienke	1
8	Timbaland	1
8	OneRepublic	1

== See also ==
- 2007 in music
- List of number-one hits (Netherlands)
