= Manu Dibango =

Cameroonian musician and songwriter (1933–2020)

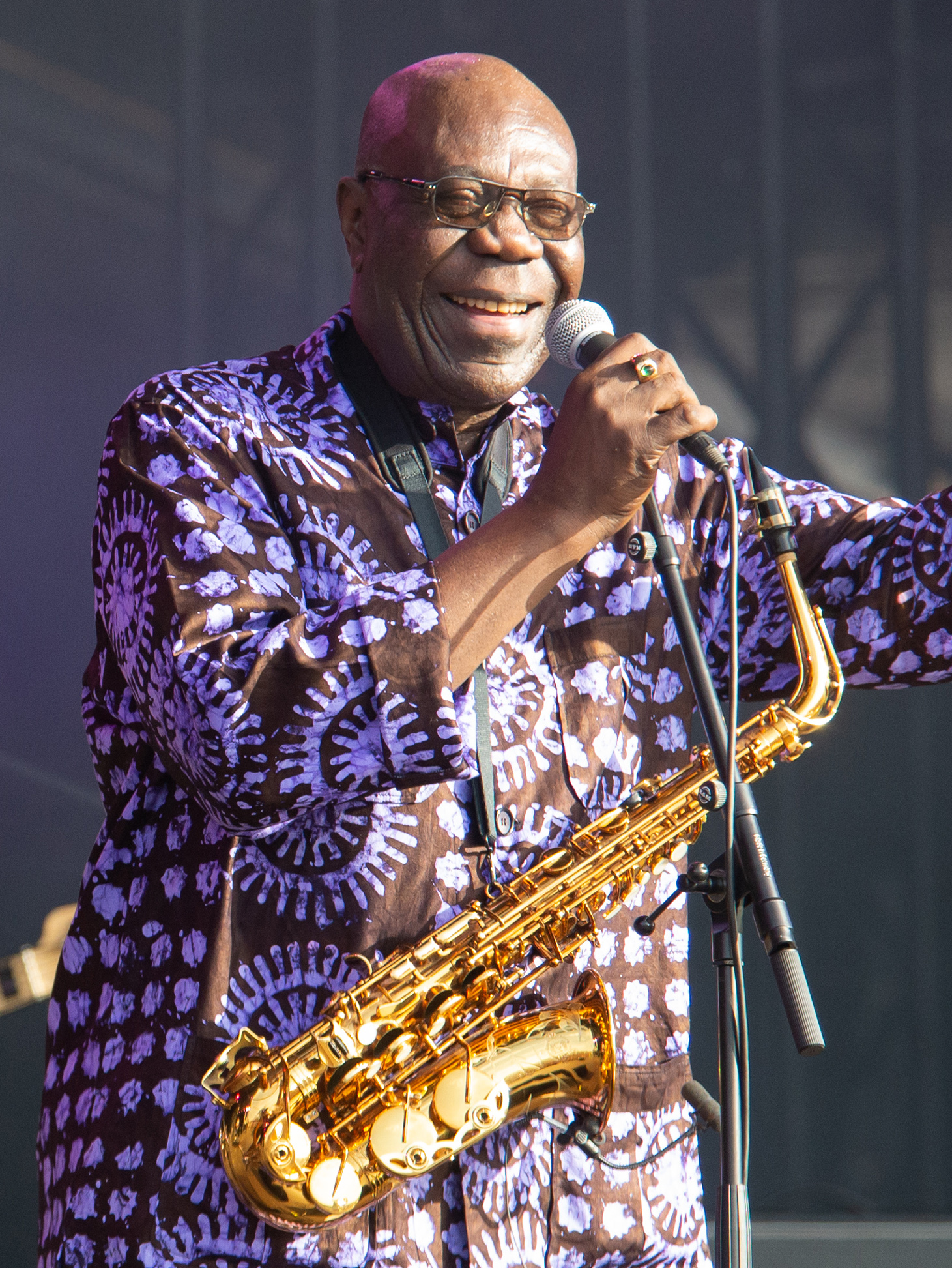
- Dibango in 2019

Background information
- Born: Emmanuel N'Djoké Dibango; 12 December 1933; Douala, French Cameroon
- Died: 24 March 2020 (aged 86) Melun, France
- Genres: Makossa, African rumba, afrofunk/afrobeat, jazz, traditional
- Occupations: Musician, songwriter
- Instruments: Saxophone, vibraphone
- Years active: 1961–2020
- Spouse: Marie-Josée @ Coco (m. 1957; died 1995)
- Website: manudibango.net

Emmanuel N'Djoké "Manu" Dibango (12 December 1933 – 24 March 2020) was a Cameroonian musician and songwriter who played saxophone and vibraphone. He developed a musical style fusing jazz, funk, and traditional Cameroonian music. His father was a member of the Yabassi ethnic group, while his mother was a Duala. He was best known for his 1972 single "Soul Makossa". The song has been referred to as the most sampled African song in addition Dibango, himself, as the most sampled African musician in history. He died from COVID-19 on 24 March 2020.

== Early life ==
Emmanuel "Manu" Dibango was born in Douala, Cameroon, in 1933. His father, Michel Manfred N'Djoké Dibango, was a civil servant. Son of a farmer, he met his wife travelling by pirogue to her residence, Douala. Emmanuel's mother was a fashion designer, running her own small business. Both her ethnic group, the Douala, and his, the Yabassi, viewed this union of different ethnic groups with some disdain. Dibango had only a stepbrother from his father's previous marriage, who was four years older than him. In Cameroon, someone's ethnicity is dictated by their father, though Dibango wrote in his autobiography, Three Kilos of Coffee, that he had "never been able to identify completely with either of [his] parents".

Dibango's uncle was the leader of his extended family. Upon his death, Dibango's father refused to take over, as he never fully initiated his son into Yabassi customs. Throughout his childhood, Dibango slowly forgot the Yabassi language in favour of the Douala. However, his family did live in the Yabassi encampment on the Yabassi plateau, close to the Wouri River in central Douala. While a child, Dibango attended Protestant church every night for religious education, or nkouaida. He enjoyed studying music there, and reportedly was a fast learner.

In 1941, after being educated at his village school, Dibango was accepted into a colonial school, near his home, where he learned French. He admired the teacher, whom he described as "an extraordinary draftsman and painter". In 1944, French president Charles de Gaulle chose this school to perform the welcoming ceremonies upon his arrival in Cameroon.

In 1949, at the age of 15, Dibango was sent by his parents to college in Saint-Calais, France. After that, he attended the lycée de Chartres, where he learned to play the piano. Adopted by the French community there, he quickly assimilated with the local culture and began to settle in the country.

== Career ==
After several stints with French jazz clubs, Dibango then moved to Belgium, where his talent attracted the owner of a Bantou club. He was then signed up by Joseph Kabasele, whose band, Le Grand Kallé et l'African Jazz (African Jazz), spearheaded a Congolese musical revolution in Africa. While in the Belgian capital of Brussels, he met his wife, a Belgian actress, model, and photographer named Marie-Josée (known as Coco), whom he married in 1957. Together with Coco, Dibango had with four children: Georgia (1969–2023), Michel, Marva, and James BKS (born 1982).

In 1959, Kabasele recorded the pan-African anthem "Indépendance Cha Cha" and invited him to the Congolese capital of Léopoldville (present-day Kinshasa) to work together. Dibango subsequently became a member of the African Jazz and collaborated with many other musicians, including Fania All Stars, Fela Kuti, Herbie Hancock, Bill Laswell, Bernie Worrell, Ladysmith Black Mambazo, King Sunny Adé, Don Cherry, and Sly and Robbie. He achieved a considerable following in the UK with a disco hit called "Big Blow", originally released in 1976 and re-mixed as a 12-inch (300 mm) single in 1978 on Island Records. In 1998, he recorded the album CubAfrica with Cuban artist Eliades Ochoa. At the 16th Annual Grammy Awards in 1974, Dibango was nominated in the categories Best R&B Instrumental Performance and Best Instrumental Composition for "Soul Makossa".

The lyrics of the song "Soul Makossa" on the album of the same name contain the word "makossa", which refers to a style of Cameroonian urban music and means "(I) dance" in Dibango's native tongue, the Cameroonian language Duala. The song has influenced popular music hits, including Kool and the Gang's "Jungle Boogie".

In Canada, two other songs ranked on the AC charts. "Pepe Soup" was number 33 in 1974 and "Ashiko Go" was number 21 in 1975. His wife Coco died in 1995; while having a difficult time getting over the loss of what he considered his most beloved "Guardian Angel", Dibango released his religious Lamastabastani album in the same year, which he said is largely inspired by the late Coco.

He served as the first chairman of the Cameroon Music Corporation, with a high profile in disputes about artists' royalties. Dibango was appointed a UNESCO Artist for Peace in 2004.

His song "Reggae Makossa" is featured on the soundtrack to the 2006 video game Scarface: The World Is Yours. In August 2009, he played the closing concert at the revived Brecon Jazz Festival.

His song "New Bell" is featured on the soundtrack to the 2008 video game Grand Theft Auto IV in the radio station International Funk 99.

In 1982, Michael Jackson used the "Ma ma-se, ma ma-sa, ma ma-kossa" hook from Dibango's 1972 single "Soul Makossa", without his permission and without credit, for his 1983 song "Wanna Be Startin' Somethin'" from his superhit 1982 album Thriller. When Dibango found out, he considered suing the megastar, but Jackson was quick to admit that he had borrowed the line and the matter was settled out of court.

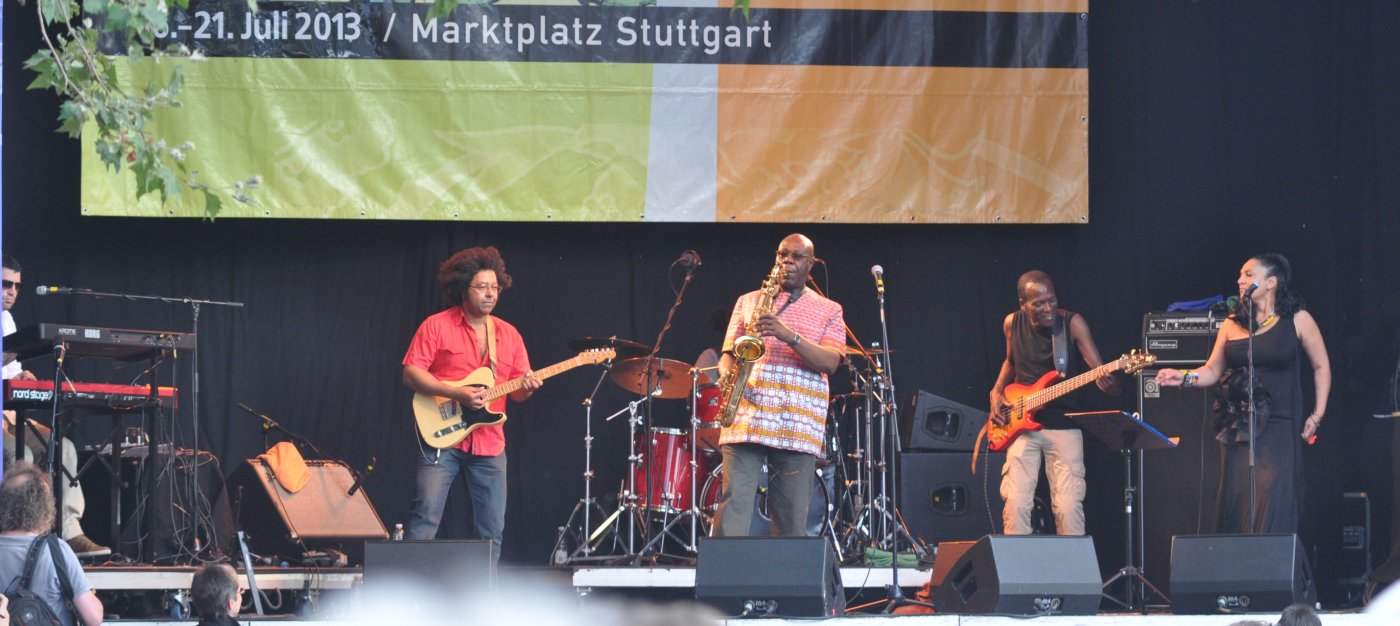
Manu Dibango - Stuttgart 17 July 2013 - 2

In 2007, Rihanna sampled the same hook from Jackson's song for her track "Don't Stop the Music" and did not credit Dibango. When Rihanna had asked Jackson for permission to sample the line, he allegedly approved the request without contacting Dibango beforehand. In 2009, Dibango sued both singers. Dibango's attorneys brought the case before a court in Paris, demanding €500,000 in damages and asking for Sony BMG, EMI and Warner Music to be "barred from receiving 'mama-se mama-sa'-related income until the matter is resolved". The judge ruled that Dibango's claim was inadmissible: a year earlier, a different Paris-area judge had required Universal Music to include Dibango's name in the liner notes of future French releases of "Don't Stop the Music", and, at the time of this earlier court appearance, Dibango had withdrawn legal action, thereby waiving his right to seek further damages.

In July 2014, he performed an 80th birthday concert at the Olympia in Paris which was broadcast by TV5Monde.

On 8 September 2015, Michaëlle Jean, Secretary General of the Organisation Internationale de la Francophonie, honoured Manu Dibango with the title of Grand Témoin de la Francophonie aux Jeux Olympiques et Paralympiques de Rio 2016.

== Death ==
On 24 March 2020, Dibango died from COVID-19 in Melun near Paris, France. The news of his death was confirmed by his family via social media (Twitter). In response, many musicians and fans praised him as a musician and composer. He was 86 years old.

== Discography ==
=== As leader ===
- Saxy-Party (Mercury, 1969)
- Manu Dibango (Fiesta, 1971)
- Africadelic (Mondiophone, 1972)
- Soul Makossa (Fiesta, 1972)
- O Boso (Fiesta, 1972)
- African Voodoo (PSI, 1972)
- Makossa Man (Fiesta, 1973)
- Super Kumba (Fiesta, 1974)
- Countdown at Kusini (D.S.T., 1975)
- Afrovision (Fiesta, 1976)
- Manu 76 (Fiesta, 1976)
- Bande Originale du Film Ceddo (Fiesta, 1977)
- A L'Olympia (Fiesta, 1977)
- L'Herbe Sauvage (Fiesta 1977)
- Anniversaire Au Pays (Fiesta, 1978)
- Le Prix De La Liberte (Fiesta, 1978)
- Home Made (Fiesta, 1979)
- Gone Clear (CRC, 1980)
- Piano Solo Melodies Africaines Vol. 1 (AfroVision, 1981)
- Ambassador (CRC, 1981)
- Waka Juju (CRC, 1982)
- Mboa (AfroVision, 1982)
- Soft and Sweet (Garima, 1983)
- Deliverance Live in Douala (AfroVision, 1983)
- Surtension (Garima, 1984)
- Melodies Africaines Vol. 2 (AfroVision, 1984)
- L'Aventure Ambigue (Carrere, 1984)
- Electric Africa (Celluloid, 1985)
- Manu Invite... Akofa Akoussah Au Togo (Blackspot, 1983)
- Afrijazzy (Soul Paris, 1986)
- La Fete a Manu (Buda Musique, 1988)
- Negropolitaines Vol. 1 (Soul Paris, 1989)
- Comment Faire L'Amour Avec Un Negre Sans Se Fatiguer (Milan, 1989)
- Polysonik (Fnac Music, 1990)
- Live '91 (Fnac Music, 1991)
- Bao Bao (Mau Mau, 1992)
- Wakafrika (Fnac Music, 1994)
- Lamastabastani (Soul Paris, 1995)
- Negropolitaines Vol. 2 (Soul Paris, 1995)
- Papa Groove Live 96 (Wotre Music, 1996)
- CubAfrica (Melodie, 1998)
- Manu Safari (Wagram, 1998)
- Mboa' Su Kamer Feeling (JPS, 2000)
- Spirituals (Bayard Musique, 2000)
- Kamer Feeling (JPS, 2001)
- From Africa (Blue Moon, 2003)
- Homage to New Orleans (Goya, 2007)
- Lion of Africa (Global Mix, 2007)
- Past Present Future (BorderBlaster, 2011)
- Ballad Emotion (Konga Music, 2011)
- Balade en Saxo (EGT, 2014)

=== Compilations ===
- African Soul - The Very Best Of Manu Dibango (1997)
- Anthology (2000)
- Africadelic - The Best Of Manu Dibango (2003)
- The Rough Guide To Manu Dibango (2004)

== General sources ==
- Dibango, Manu; Rouard, Danielle; Raps, Beth G (1994), Three Kilos of Coffee: An Autobiography, Chicago: University of Chicago Press, ISBN 0-226-14491-7, OCLC 29519086
