= Prismophonic =

Studio album by Christophe Willem
- Released: 21 November 2011
- Recorded: France
- Genre: Pop
- Label: Columbia, Sony Music
- Producer: Steve Anderson; Sarah de Courcy; Freemasons; Phil Greiss; Ash Howes; Jean-Pierre Pilot; William Rousseau; Olivier Schultheis; Richard "Biff" Stannard; Richard X

Christophe Willem chronology
Caféine (2009)	Prismophonic (2011)	Paraît-il (2014)

Singles from Prismophonic
- 1. "Cool" Released: 20 September 2011; 2. "Si mes larmes tombent" Released: February 2012; 3. "Starlite" Released: 4 June 2012; 4. "L'amour me gagne" Released: 22 October 2012

Prismophonic is the third album by French singer Christophe Willem. It was released on 21 November 2011 and produced three singles: "Cool", "Si mes larmes tombent" and "Starlite". The first single, "Cool", was released on 20 September 2011. It was released as both a physical and digital single. Fellow French singer Zaho features on the song "Indelebile", and Kylie Minogue co-wrote the song "Pas Si Loin". The album was released in both a standard and collector's edition format. The collector's edition includes a bonus DVD and comes in a silver/grey box.

An English-language version titled Love Shot Me Down was released on 17 December 2012. The songs Starlight and Love Shot Me Down were released as singles.

Prismophonic was ranked as the 16th best pop album of 2011 by Popjustice.com.

== Track listing ==
1. "Starlite" – 3:33
2. "Cool" – 3:14
3. "L'amour me gagne" – 4:14
4. "Si mes larmes tombent" – 3:56
5. "Indelebile" featuring Zaho – 3:47
6. "Jamais du" – 3:33
7. "Ennemis in L.O.V.E" – 3:42
8. "Automatik" – 3:51
9. "Pas si loin" – 3:09
10. "Je rejoins la scene" – 3:46
11. "Le Temps qu'il reste" – 4:04
12. "Falling" – 5:26

Collector's edition bonus DVD

- Making of Prismophonic
- W&Z – Question responses by Willem and Zaho
- "Cool" music video

== Charts ==
=== Weekly charts ===
Weekly chart performance for Prismophonic
Chart (2011)	Peak position
Belgian Albums (Ultratop Wallonia)	5
French Albums (SNEP)	3
Swiss Albums (Schweizer Hitparade)	47

=== Year-end charts ===
2011 year-end chart performance for Prismophonic
Chart (2011)	Position
French Albums (SNEP)	66

2012 year-end chart performance for Prismophonic
Chart (2012)	Position
Belgian Albums (Ultratop Wallonia)	35
French Albums (SNEP)	107

== Certification ==
Certifications for Prismophonic
Country	Certification
France	Platinum
