= Soul Makossa =

Single by Manu Dibango

from the album Soul Makossa
- A-side: "Hymne de la 8e Coupe d'Afrique des Nations" (original)
- B-side: "Lily" (reissue)
- Released: 1972
- Recorded: 1971
- Genre: Makossa
- Length: 4:30 (original non-edited version)
- Label: Fiesta Records (France); Atlantic Records (US); London Records (UK/Canada); BorderBlaster (Europe)
- Songwriter: Manu Dibango

Manu Dibango singles chronology
"Soul Makossa" (1972)	"Pêpê Soup" (1973)

TV performance
- "Soul Makossa" (ORTF, 1973) on YouTube

"Soul Makossa" is a song by Cameroonian saxophonist and songwriter Manu Dibango, released as a single in 1972. It is the most sampled African song in history. The song was originally recorded as the B-side for "Hymne de la 8e Coupe d'Afrique des Nations", a song celebrating the Cameroon national football team's accession to the quarterfinals of the Africa Cup of Nations football tournament, as well as Cameroon's hosting the games for the first time; the lyrics were written by Cameroonian poet and musicologist S.M. Eno Belinga. Except for some words in English, it was written in Duala, a native dialect continuum from Cameroon. Manu Dibango later recorded a new version for his 1994 album Wakafrika, titled "Mouvement Ewondo".

In 1972, David Mancuso found a copy in a Brooklyn West Indian record store and often played it at his parties at The Loft. The response was so positive that the few copies of "Soul Makossa" in New York City were quickly purchased. The song was subsequently played heavily by Frankie Crocker, who deejayed at WBLS, then New York's most popular black radio station. Since the original release was so obscure, at least 23 groups quickly released cover versions to capitalize on the demand for the record.

Later in 1972, American-based Atlantic Records licensed the original Manu Dibango version from French record label Fiesta, and released it as a single (with the B-side track being "Lily"). The single peaked at number 35 on the US Billboard Hot 100 chart in 1973; Dibango's original version of the song and a cover by Afrique were on the US Billboard Hot 100 chart at the same time. The song also became an international hit leading to even more cover versions by various groups around the world.

The song is probably best known for the chanted vocal refrain "ma-ma-ko, ma-ma-sa, ma-ko ma-ko-sa", which was adapted and used in songs by many prominent artists such as Michael Jackson's "Wanna Be Startin' Somethin'" from his album Thriller (1982) and Rihanna's hit single "Don't Stop the Music" from Good Girl Gone Bad (2007). The refrain is a play on the word makossa, Dibango's main music genre.

In 2011, a second version of the song titled "Soul Makossa 2.0" was recorded in France by Manu Dibango and Wayne Beckford and was issued as the first single from Dibango's album, Past Present Future.

In 2022, Rolling Stone ranked the song number 35 in their list of the "200 Greatest Dance Songs of All Time". The 2024 PBS series Disco: Soundtrack of a Revolution explores the importance of "Soul Makossa" to the history of disco music.

== Michael Jackson/Rihanna lawsuit ==
Rihanna's 2007 hit single "Don't Stop the Music" uses samples from Michael Jackson's 1982 single "Wanna Be Startin' Somethin'". In February 2009, Dibango filed a lawsuit against the two singers, claiming that he wasn't consulted in Michael Jackson's representatives giving permission to Rihanna to use "mama-say mama-sa mama-ko-sa" (a hook inspired by Dibango's "Soul Makossa") without permission. According to Agence France-Presse, Dibango and Michael Jackson had earlier reached a financial settlement in this matter back in the days of the making of "Wanna Be Startin' Somethin'". But in 2007, when Rihanna asked Jackson for permission to sample the line, he allegedly approved the request without contacting Dibango beforehand. Dibango's attorneys brought the case before a court in Paris, demanding €500,000 in damages and for Sony BMG, EMI and Warner Music to be "barred from receiving 'mama-say mama-sa'-related income until the matter is resolved". However, the court in Paris rejected his motion as being illegitimate due to him successfully applying for his name being listed on Rihanna’s releases of the song a year earlier. The court in Paris ruled that with this agreement the African artist abdicated from any further claims.

== 1973 US single ==
=== Track listing ===
1. "Soul Makossa" – 4:30
2. "Lily" – 3:02

=== Personnel ===
- Manu Dibango – writer, arranger, vocals, saxophone
- Georges Arvanitas – piano
- Patrice Galas – piano
- Joby Jobs – drums
- Manfred Long – bass guitar
- Freddy Mars – percussion
- Manu Rodanet – electric guitar
- Pierre Zogo – acoustic guitar

=== Charts ===
Chart (1973)	Peak position
Australia (Kent Music Report)	26
Canada (RPM) Top Singles	26
Canada (RPM) Top AC Singles	21
Canada (RPM) Top Albums	48
France (SNEP)	17
US Billboard Hot 100	35
US Hot Soul Singles (Billboard)	21
