= Double je =

Single by Christophe Willem

from the album Inventaire
- B-side: "Des Nues"
- Released: 25 May 2007
- Recorded: France
- Genre: Pop, dance
- Length: 3:16
- Label: Sony BMG
- Songwriters: Zazie (lyrics); Jean-Pierre Pilot, Olivier Schultheis (music)
- Producers: Jean-Pierre Pilot, Olivier Schultheis, Benoit Courti

Christophe Willem singles chronology
| "Élu produit de l'année" (2007) | "Double je" (2007) | "Jacques a dit" (2007) |

"Double je" is a 2007 song recorded by the French singer Christophe Willem with lyrics by Zazie. It was his third single and the second one from his debut album, Inventaire. Released on 25 May 2007, the single was a hit in France, Mauritius and Belgium, topping the singles charts for about two months and thus becoming the singer's best-selling single.

== Background, lyrics, music and video ==
"Double je" was composed by the French artist Zazie. The song, with its "very funky melody and background vocals", was considered as being "much more effective" than the previous single, "Élu produit de l'année", released some weeks earlier digitally in France and as a single in Belgium (Wallonia).

Willem chose the "self-mockery" to illustrate the song, which has also electronic sonorities. Produced by the director Sylvain Fusée who also wrote the screenplay with Willem, the music video shows the singer participating in a group therapy, to express his dual personality. It was nominated for the 2008 Victoires de la Musique in the category 'best videoclip of the year'. It did not win, but the song was awarded 'original song of the year'.

== Chart performances ==
In France, the single entered at number-one on the French Singles Chart, on 2 June 2007, selling 38,002 units this week. It remained for seven non consecutive weeks at the top, then dropped slowly almost every week. The single stayed for 18 weeks in the top ten, 24 weeks in the top 50 and 35 weeks in the top 100. Certified Platinum disc by the SNEP, the song was the best-selling single of the year, with 309,481 sales. The single was also a success on the digital chart : entered at number 17 on 14 April 2007, it jumped to number one the next week, and remained on the chart (top 40) for one year. It was ranked at number two on the End of the Year Chart.

As of August 2014, it was the 48th best-selling single of the 21st century in France, with 400,000 units sold.

In Belgium (Wallonia), the single charted for 38 weeks on the Ultratop 40, from 12 May 2007. It debuted at number 27 and reached the top ten in the fifth week. It was number one four weeks later and remained there for three consecutive weeks, then dropped to number two for six weeks. It totaled 19 weeks in the top ten, achieved Gold status and became the fourth best-selling single of the year.

In Switzerland, the song achieved a minor success: after a debut at number 69 on 20 May, it peaked at number 21 four weeks later, and stayed in the top 100 for 25 weeks.

== Track listings ==
- CD single
1. "Double je" — 3:16
2. "Des Nues" — 3:55
3. "Double je" (club mix) — 4:31
- Digital download
1. "Double je" — 3:16
2. "Double je" (club mix) — 4:31

== Charts and sales ==
=== Peak positions ===
| Chart (2007) | Peak position |
|---|---|
| Belgian (Wallonia) Singles Chart | 1 |
| Eurochart Hot 100 | 3 |
| French Digital Chart | 1 |
| French SNEP Singles Chart | 1 |
| Swiss Singles Chart | 21 |

=== End of year charts ===
| End of year chart (2007) | Position |
|---|---|
| Belgian (Wallonia) Singles Chart | 4 |
| French Airplay Chart | 2 |
| French Digital Chart | 2 |
| French Singles Chart | 1 |
| French TV Airplay Chart | 1 |
| Swiss Singles Chart | 88 |
| End of year chart (2008) | Position |
| Belgian (Wallonia) Singles Chart | 78 |

=== Certifications ===
| Country | Certification | Date | Sales certified |
|---|---|---|---|
| Belgium | Gold | 11 August 2007 | 20,000 |
| France | Platinum | 25 October 2007 | 300,000 |
