= Relax, Take It Easy =

2007 single by Mika

Single by Mika

from the album Life in Cartoon Motion
- B-side: "Lollipop"
- Written: 7 July 2005
- Released: October 2006; January 2007
- Recorded: 2006—2007
- Genre: Electropop
- Length: 4:30 (album version); 3:42 (radio edit); 3:38 (new radio edit)
- Label: Casablanca
- Songwriters: Mika; Nick Van Eede
- Producer: Greg Wells

Mika singles chronology
"Relax, Take It Easy" (2007)	"Grace Kelly" (2007)

Music videos
- "Relax, Take It Easy" on YouTube; "Relax, Take It Easy" (New version) on YouTube

Alternative cover
- Re-release cover

"Relax, Take It Easy" is the debut single by British singer-songwriter Mika, from his debut album Life in Cartoon Motion. In the UK, it failed to chart upon its original release in October 2006, but after "Grace Kelly" topped the charts in January 2007, it managed to peak at number 67 on the UK Downloads Chart because of download sales.

The song makes use of a melody line from the Cutting Crew hit single "(I Just) Died in Your Arms". In North America, it was released as the third single from the album. The song was released as Mika's sixth single in the UK in stores on 31 December 2007, and for digital download on 24 December 2007 as a double A-side with "Lollipop". This single peaked at number 18 on the UK Singles Chart. The song was also featured prominently in the movie Were the World Mine. It is also in the 2011 film Monte Carlo.

== Background and composition ==
Mika described the story behind the song in an interview with The Sun newspaper, on 2 February 2007:

"I always wanted to write a dance song that wasn't a really full dance track, that felt organic. So when I came into producing 'Relax' I made sure that most of the sounds we used were actually made by real instruments. We used some great session musicians who had worked with Quincy Jones and Michael Jackson. And we picked up the strangest pedal combinations to get all these weird sounds. It's really effective – you can't tell if it's a full dance track or really laid-back. It feels a bit weird electronically. The organic-ness gives a more classic field to it. So it was one of the harder tracks for me to produce, but also the most rewarding."

In a 2017 episode of his show Stasera Casa Mika on the Italian TV channel Rai 2, Mika described that as a child he was scared of the London Underground, before becoming used to the noise and crowds as he grew up. Many years later, he was aboard a Tube train travelling to a recording studio when the train suddenly stopped. The lights went out, reminding him of his childhood fears. As lights came on again, passengers were told to leave the train. Outside there were police all around: it was 7 July 2005 London bombings. He walked home and, still frightened, started singing. Once home, he wrote the song in twenty minutes.

It uses the melody from "(I Just) Died in Your Arms Tonight" by the Cutting Crew. The song is an upbeat pop track with a disco-like bassline and a funky guitar riff in the background on the choruses, where he sings: "It's as if I'm scared/It's as if I'm terrified/It's as if I scared/It's as if I'm playing with fire". It is set in the key of F♯ minor.

== Critical reception ==
The song received positive reviews from music critics. Beth Johnson from Entertainment Weekly wrote that the song is "a Bee Gees-ish shout-out to Frankie Goes to Hollywood." Craig McLean from The Guardian somewhat echoed the previous review, writing that the song "became the best song the Bee Gees never wrote." Christian John Mikane from PopMatters wrote that "the song is among the better songs on the album." He described the music as "gloriously synthetic, but the confidence in Mika's voice more than compensates for the artificiality of the music."

While commenting about his voice, John Murphy from musicOMH wrote that "He has an unfeasibly high falsetto, which works on the Pet Shop Boys-like electro pop track." Graham Griffith from About.com wrote that the song "channels the flawless electropop of the Scissor Sisters without being completely unoriginal." Heather Phares from AllMusic agreed, writing that "it is in the same vein of hypnotic, danceable melancholy as the Scissor Sisters' reworking of 'Comfortably Numb', albeit less showy." Sal Cinquemani from Slant Magazine wrote a positive review, saying that "Mika fares best when he straddles the fence, as he does on the thumping hodgepodge 'Relax'." Dom Passantino wrote a more negative review for Stylus Magazine, saying that "Songs like 'Relax, Take It Easy' seem to be an attempt at simulating the effect that Supertramp chloroforming you in your sleep would produce."

== Commercial performance ==
The song debuted at number 12 in the week ending 30 June 2007 in the Billboard European Hot 100, jumping to number 8 the following week, to number 4 in its third week, and to number 2 in its fourth week, despite not being released in some European countries such as the United Kingdom. In Spain, the song received double platinum certification for more than 40,000 downloads. The song peaked at number 4 in the Spanish download chart. The song spent 2 weeks at number 1 on the Belgian Ultratop Chart, 7 weeks at number 1 on the Dutch Top 40 Chart and 15 weeks at number 1 on the French Download Chart. The song received gold certification in Russia with 50,000 copies sold.

== Music video ==
There are two versions of the "Relax, Take It Easy" music video. The first features a blue background with drawings based on Mika's songs that contain characters like Lollipop Girl, Big Girl and Billy Brown. It also contained colourful cartoon cables for the amplifiers, and in some parts it contained images of Mika in a concert in Europe. This version played on VH1 around the world. This version was used for the Life in Cartoon Motion release. This version is used for public use. The second version of the video is the newest. It was released in Britain and some countries in Europe for the re-release of the single. Version two contains videos and images taken by fans from Mika's numerous concerts. The video was officially released on YouTube. The video has received high ratings on YouTube, though it hasn't been released in any public release by MIKA.

== Track listings ==
2006

- CD1
1. "Relax, Take It Easy" – 4:10
2. "Billy Brown" – 3:14
- CD2
1. "Relax, Take It Easy" – 4:10
2. "Relax, Take It Easy" (Ashley Beedle's Castro Vocal Mix) – 6:37
3. "Relax, Take It Easy" (Acoustic) – 4:18
4. "Relax, Take It Easy" (Video)
- 7" vinyl
1. "Relax, Take It Easy" – 4:10
2. "Billy Brown" – 3:14
- 12" vinyl
1. "Relax, Take It Easy" (Ashley Beedle's Castro Vocal Mix) – 6:37
2. "Relax, Take It Easy" (Ashley Beedle's Dub) – 7:08
3. "Relax, Take It Easy" – 4:10

2007

- CD1
1. "Relax, Take It Easy" – 3:38
2. "Lollipop" (Live From L'Olympia Paris)
3. "I Want You Back" (Live From L'Olympia Paris)
4. "Relax, Take It Easy" (Dennis Christopher Remix Radio Edit)
5. "Lollipop" (Fred Deakin's Fredmix)
- CD2
1. "Relax, Take It Easy" – 3:38
2. "Lollipop" – 3:43
- USB stick
1. "Relax, Take It Easy" – 3:38
2. "Lollipop" – 3:43
3. "Relax, Take It Easy" (Alpha Beat Remix)
4. "Relax, Take It Easy" (Frank Musikmix)
5. "Relax, Take It Easy" (Ashley Beedle's Castro Vocal Mix)
6. "Relax, Take It Easy" (Live In Paris – Video)
7. "Lollipop" (16:9 Bunny Action – Video)

== Charts ==
=== Weekly charts ===
2006–2008 weekly chart performance for "Relax, Take It Easy"
Chart (2006–2008)	Peak position
Austria (Ö3 Austria Top 40)	3
Belgium (Ultratop 50 Flanders)	1
Belgium (Ultratop 50 Wallonia)	1
Canada Hot 100 (Billboard)	15
CIS Airplay (TopHit)	2
Czech Republic Airplay (ČNS IFPI)	1
Denmark (Tracklisten)	2
Europe (Eurochart Hot 100)	2
Finland (Suomen virallinen lista)	15
France (SNEP)	1
Germany (GfK)	4
Hungary (Dance Top 40)	23
Hungary (Editors' Choice Top 40)	36
Ireland (IRMA)	8
Italy (FIMI)	2
Netherlands (Dutch Top 40)	1
Netherlands (Single Top 100)	1
Norway (VG-lista)	2
Poland Airplay (Nielsen Music Control)	1
Romania Airplay (Romanian Top 100)	1
Russia Airplay (TopHit)	2
Slovakia Airplay (ČNS IFPI)	4
Sweden (Sverigetopplistan)	26
Switzerland (Schweizer Hitparade)	2
Ukraine Airplay (TopHit)	37
UK Singles (Official Charts)	18
US Dance Club Songs (Billboard)	14
Venezuela Pop Rock Airplay (Record Report)	2

2011–2025 weekly chart performance for "Relax, Take It Easy"
Chart (2011–2025)	Peak position
Belarus Airplay (TopHit)	100
CIS Airplay (TopHit)	100
Finland Airplay (Radiosoittolista)	87
Kazakhstan Airplay (TopHit)	62
Lithuania Airplay (TopHit)	103
Romania Airplay (TopHit)	83
Ukraine Airplay (TopHit)	85

=== Monthly charts ===
Initial monthly chart performance for "Relax, Take It Easy"
Chart (2006–07)	Peak position
CIS Airplay (TopHit)	3
Russia Airplay (TopHit)	2
Ukraine Airplay (TopHit)	44

2024 monthly chart performance for "Relax, Take It Easy"
Chart (2024)	Peak position
Kazakhstan Airplay (TopHit)	67

=== Year-end charts ===
2006 year-end chart performance for "Relax, Take It Easy"
Chart (2006)	Position
CIS Airplay (TopHit)	194
Russia Airplay (TopHit)	185

2007 year-end chart performance for "Relax, Take It Easy"
Chart (2007)	Position
Austria (Ö3 Austria Top 40)	13
Belgium (Ultratop 50 Flanders)	2
Belgium (Ultratop 50 Wallonia)	3
CIS Airplay (TopHit)	1
Europe (Eurochart Hot 100)	14
France (SNEP)	8
Germany (Media Control GfK)	26
Italy (FIMI)	7
Netherlands (Dutch Top 40)	5
Netherlands (Single Top 100)	3
Romania (Romanian Top 100)	10
Russia Airplay (TopHit)	1
Switzerland (Schweizer Hitparade)	5
Ukraine Airplay (TopHit)	118

2008 year-end chart performance for "Relax, Take It Easy"
Chart (2008)	Position
Switzerland (Schweizer Hitparade)	71
UK Singles (OCC)	122

2010 year-end chart performance for "Relax, Take It Easy"
Chart (2010)	Position
Ukraine Airplay (TopHit)	179

2010 year-end chart performance for "Relax, Take It Easy"
Chart (2010)	Position
Ukraine Airplay (TopHit)	117

2024 year-end chart performance for "Relax, Take It Easy"
Chart (2024)	Position
Kazakhstan Airplay (TopHit)	81
Lithuania Airplay (TopHit)	100

2025 year-end chart performance for "Relax, Take It Easy"
Chart (2025)	Position
CIS Airplay (TopHit)	187
Lithuania Airplay (TopHit)	141

=== Decade-end charts ===
2000s decade-end chart performance for "Relax, Take It Easy"
Chart (2000–2009)	Position
CIS Airplay (TopHit)	2
Russia Airplay (TopHit)	1

2010s decade-end chart performance for "Relax, Take It Easy"
Chart (2010–2019)	Position
Ukraine Airplay (TopHit)	191

== Certifications ==
Certifications and sales for "Relax, Take It Easy"
Region	Certification	Certified units/sales
Belgium (BRMA)	Platinum	50,000^{*}
Denmark (IFPI Danmark)	Platinum	8,000^{^}
Germany (BVMI)	Platinum	300,000^{‡}
Italy (FIMI)	Platinum	30,000^{‡}
United Kingdom (BPI)	Gold	400,000^{‡}
^{*} Sales figures based on certification alone.^{^} Shipments figures based on certification alone.^{‡} Sales+streaming figures based on certification alone.

== See also ==
- List of Dutch Top 40 number-one singles of 2007
- List of number-one hits of 2007 (France)
- Ultratop 40 number-one hits of 2007
- Ultratop 50 number-one hits of 2007
- List of Romanian Top 100 number ones of the 2000s
