= Inventaire =

Studio album by Christophe Willem
- Released: April 16, 2007
- Recorded: France
- Genre: Pop
- Label: Sony BMG

Christophe Willem chronology
Inventaire (2007)	Caféine (2009)

Singles from Inventaire
- 1. "Élu Produit de l'année" Released: March 22, 2007; 2. "Double Je" Released: May 25, 2007; 3. "Jacques a dit" Released: October 5, 2007; 4. "Quelle chance/September" Released: April 2008

Inventaire is the name given to the debut album of the French singer Christophe Willem. It was released on April 16, 2007 and was supported by the two hit singles "Double Je" and "Jacques a dit", which were top five hits in France and Belgium. The album was mainly composed by the French artists Zazie and Philippe Katerine.

It was the third more successful album of 2007 in France, and a huge success in francophone countries, with about 1 million copies sold. "Double Je" topped the French charts and was awarded the Victoire de la Musique for Song of the Year, while Willem won Best French Revelation of the Year. The album itself won Francophone Album of the Year at the 2008 NRJ Music Awards.

An acoustic version of the album was released, which also included the track "Sunny" and a cover of The Cranberries track "Zombie".

== Track listing ==
No.	Title	Lyrics	Music	Length
1.	"Jacques a dit" (French for Simon Says; literally "Jacques Said")	Zazie	Zazie, Jean-Pierre Pilot, Olivier Schultheis	3:49
2.	"Quelle Chance" ("What a Luck")	Zazie	Zazie, Pilot, Schultheis	4:15
3.	"Élu Produit de l'année" ("Elected Product of the Year")	Matthias Debureaux	Bertrand Burgalat	3:16
4.	"Double Je" (Remix; untranslatable word play)	Zazie	Zazie, Pilot, Schultheis	3:18
5.	"Chambre avec vue" ("Room with a View")	Natacha Le Jeune	Christophe Willem	4:31
6.	"Le Lycée" ("The High School")	Philippe Katerine	Katerine	3:22
7.	"Intemporel" (Timeless)	Benjamin Kerber	Bertrand Burgalat	3:59
8.	"Safe Text"	Zazie	Zazie, Pilot, Schultheis	3:59
9.	"Kiss the Bride"	Rémy Lacroix, Pierre Demarty	Lacroix	3:53
10.	"Pourquoi tu t'en vas?" (featuring Valérie Lemercier; "Why are you Leaving?")	Lemercier	Bertrand Burgalat	3:26
11.	"Demain" ("Tomorrow")	Pap Deziel	Benoît de Villeneuve	3:18
12.	"La Tortue" ("The Turtle")	Katerine	Katerine	2:52
13.	"Bombe anatomique" ("Anatomic Bomb"; wordplay on Atomic Bomb)	Zazie	Zazie, Pilot, Schultheis	3:07
14.	"Double Je" (Original)	Zazie	Zazie, Pilot, Schultheis	3:38
15.	"Jacques a dit" (Remix)	Zazie	Zazie, Pilot, Schultheis	3:56

Digital Download Bonus Track
No.	Title	Lyrics	Music	Length
16.	"Des nues"	Caroline Nahon	Willem	3:55

== Track listing - Tout En Acoustic ==
1. "Élu Produit de l'année"
2. "Quelle chance"
3. "Jacques a dit"
4. "Le Lycée"
5. "Sunny"
6. "Bombe anatomique"
7. "Zombie"
8. "Chambre avec vue"
9. "Des Nues"
10. "Safe Text"
11. "Double Je"
12. "Kiss the Bride"

== Personnel ==
- Christophe Willem - lead and backing vocals
- Zazie - backing vocals in "Jacques a dit", "Quelle Chance", "Double Je (Remix)", "Safe Text", "Bombe Anatomique", "Double Je (Original)", and "Jacques a dit (Remix)"
- Valérie Lemercier - co-lead vocals in "Pourquoi tu t'en vas?"
- Philippe Katerine - backing vocals in "La Tortue"

== Charts ==
Chart (2007)	Peak position
Belgian (Wallonia) Albums Chart	1
French Digital Chart	1
French Albums Chart	1
Swiss Albums Chart	7
World Albums Chart	9

End of year chart (2007)	Position
Belgian (Wallonia) Albums Chart	5
French Digital Chart	2
French Albums Chart	4

== Certifications ==
Certifications for Inventaire
Region	Certification	Certified units/sales
Belgium (BEA)	Platinum	50,000^{*}
France (SNEP)	3× Platinum	600,000^{*}
Switzerland (IFPI Switzerland)	Gold	15,000^{^}
^{*} Sales figures based on certification alone.^{^} Shipments figures based on certification alone.
