= Jacques a dit =

Single by Christophe Willem

from the album Inventaire
- B-side: "Previous singles in an acoustic version"
- Released: 5 October 2007
- Recorded: France
- Genre: Pop
- Length: 3:49
- Label: Columbia
- Songwriters: Zazie (lyrics); Jean-Pierre Pilot, Olivier Schultheis (music)
- Producers: Jean-Pierre Pilot; Olivier Schultheis

Christophe Willem singles chronology
"Double Je" (2007)	"Jacques a dit" (2007)	"Quelle chance/September" (2008)

"Jacques a dit" is a 2007 song recorded by the French singer Christophe Willem. It was released on 5 October 2007 as the third single from his debut album Inventaire. It was a great success, particularly in Belgium, where it topped the chart, but its sales were less spectacular than that of his previous single, "Double Je".

== Background and writing ==
The title "Jacques a dit" refers to a children's game called Simon says in the English-speaking world. This song is "a moving nursery rhyme that appeals to the collective imagination and that reveals a new facet of the artist : "A hidden melancholy..."" According to Willem, "Jacques a dit" was the first song that Zazie has composed for him.

While the musical arrangements were made by Jean-Pierre Pilot and Olivier Schultheis, the text was written by Zazie, who also covered the song on her 2007 tour. She also performed the song as a duet with Willem in several French TV shows. "Jacques a dit" features on Willem's album Inventaire as first track in the original version, and as 15th track in a remix version. It was also included on the singer's live album, Inventaire, tout en acoustique, as third track.

== Chart performances ==
In France, the single debuted at a peak of number four, on 13 October 2007, and reached this position for three non-consecutive weeks. It stayed for 13 weeks in the top ten, then almost did not stop to drop, totaling 19 weeks in the top 50 and 26 weeks in the top 100. In 2007, it was the 22nd best-selling single in France.
"Jacques a dit" appeared for 21 weeks on the French Digital Download, peaking at number seven for two not consecutive weeks and being the 31st single the more downloaded.

In Belgium (Wallonia), the single charted for 26 weeks on the Ultratop 40, from 13 October 2007. It entered the chart at number 32 and climbed quickly and finally topped the chart for one week, on 1 December. It remained for 14 weeks in the top ten. It ranked 24th on the End of the Year Chart.

== Track listings ==
- CD single
1. "Jacques a dit" – 3:49
2. "Élu produit de l'année" (live acoustic) – 4:16
3. "Double Je" (live acoustic) – 4:47
4. "Sunny" (live acoustic) – 4:52
- Digital download
1. "Jacques a dit" – 3:49
2. "Jacques a dit" (remix) – 3:56
3. "Jacques a dit" (acoustic) – 4:05

== Charts and sales ==
=== Peak positions ===
Chart (2007)	Peak position
Belgian (Wallonia) Singles Chart	1
French Digital Chart	7
French SNEP Singles Chart	4
Swiss Singles Chart	35

=== End of year charts ===
End of year chart (2007)	Position
Belgian (Wallonia) Singles Chart	24
French Airplay Chart	43
French TV Music Videos Chart	63
French Digital Chart	31
French Singles Chart	22
End of year chart (2008)	Position
Belgian (Wallonia) Singles Chart	25
