= Pas le temps =

Single by Faf Larage
- B-side: "C'est pas ma faute"
- Released: September 2006
- Recorded: 2006
- Genre: Rap
- Length: 3:38
- Label: EMI, M6 Interactions
- Songwriter(s): Faf Larage; Ambo
- Producer(s): Elio; Faf Larage

Faf Larage singles chronology
"L'Américain" (2004)	"Pas le temps" (2006)	"Ta meuf (la caille)" (2007)

"Pas le temps" is the name of a 2006 song recorded by French rapper Faf Larage. It was released as a single in September 2006 and featured as theme for the opening credits of the American action/serial drama television series Prison Break in French speaking regions. The B-side is "C'est pas ma faute", a song that was released as a single in October 2007.

"Pas le temps" achieved a huge success in France and Belgium (Wallonia), topping the charts for two months, even becoming the best-selling single of 2006 in France and as of August 2014, it was the 45th best-selling single of the 21st century in France, with 413,000 units sold. It remains Larage's first big hit and his signature song.

== Track listings ==
CD single

1. "Pas le temps" (radio edit) — 3:38
2. "Pas le temps" (Instrumental) — 3:47
3. "C'est pas ma faute" — 4:03

Digital download

1. "Pas le temps" (radio edit) — 3:38

== Charts ==
=== Weekly charts ===
Weekly chart performance for "Pas le temps"
Chart (2006)	Peak position
Belgium (Ultratop 50 Wallonia)	1
Europe (Eurochart Hot 100 Singles)	6
France (Digital Chart)	2
France (SNEP)	1
Switzerland (Hitparade)	9

=== Year-end charts ===
2006 year-end chart performance for "Pas le temps"
Chart (2006)	Position
France (Digital Chart)	28
France (SNEP)	1
Switzerland (Hitparade)	86

2007 year-end chart performance for "Pas le temps"
Chart (2007)	Position
Belgium (Ultratop 50 Wallonia)	5
France (SNEP)	82

== Certifications and sales ==
Certifications for "Pas le temps"
Region	Certification	Certified units/sales
Belgium (BRMA)	Gold	25,000^{*}
France (SNEP)	Platinum	300,000^{*}
^{*} Sales figures based on certification alone.
