= Christophe Willem =

French singer (born 1983)

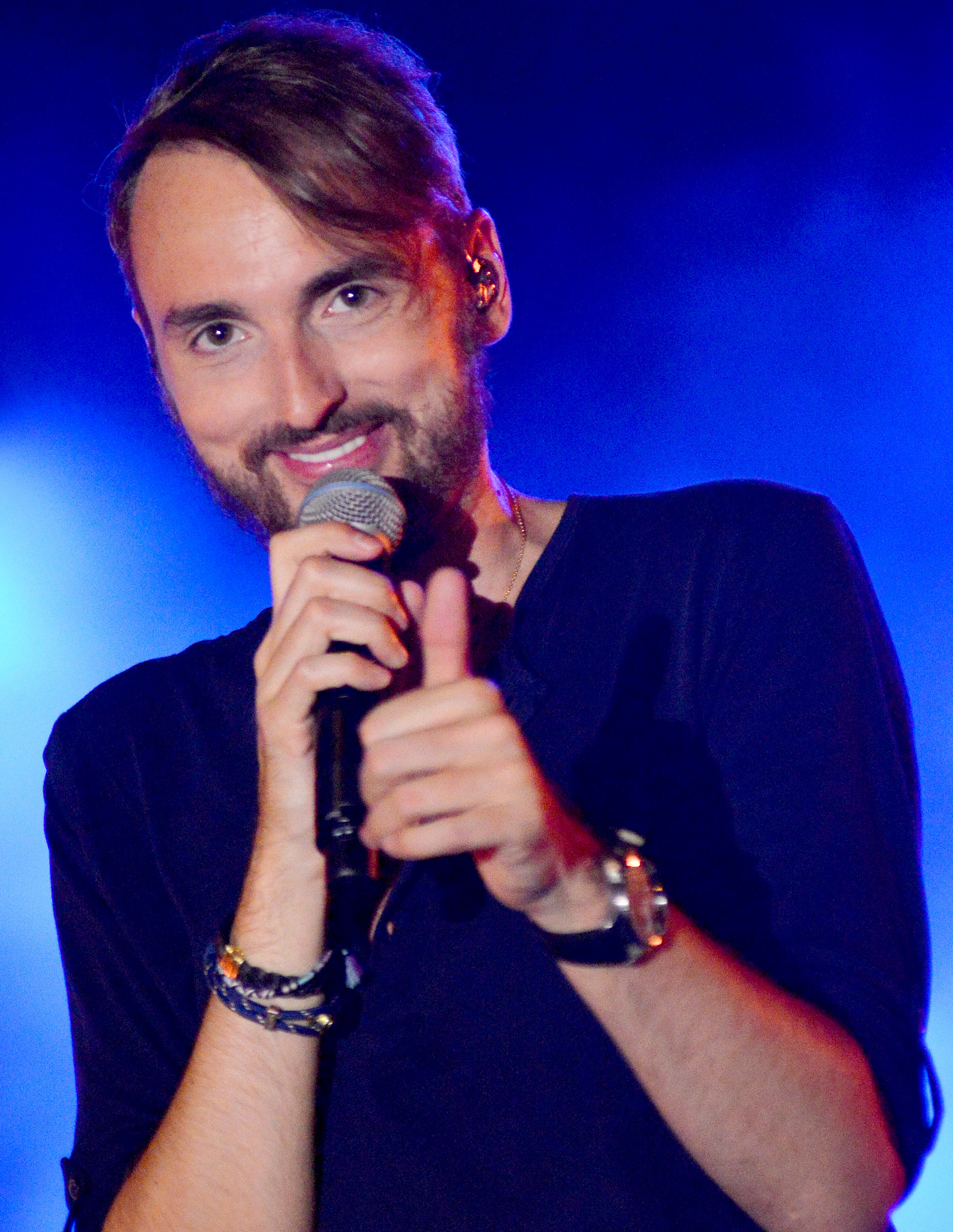
- Willem in August 2015

Background information
- Born: Christophe Frédéric Durier; 3 August 1983 (age 43); Enghien-les-Bains, Île-de-France, France
- Origin: France
- Genres: Chanson; Pop
- Occupation: Singer-songwriter
- Instruments: Vocals, piano
- Years active: 2006–present
- Labels: Columbia; Sony Music

Christophe Frédéric Durier (French pronunciation: [kʁistɔf fʁedeʁik dyʁje]; born 3 August 1983), better known by his stage name Christophe Willem (French: [kʁistɔf wilɛm]), is a French singer and the winner of the fourth edition of Nouvelle Star (French version of Pop Idol) in 2006.

== Early life ==
Willem spent most of his life in Deuil-la-Barre (Val-d'Oise), where his parents run a driving school. As a child, he learned figure skating and to play the piano. Later he learned to sing as part of a gospel choir "Young Voices". He also was composing songs at the age of fourteen.

Before deciding to study to become a lawyer and calculus professor, he continued to practice music and in 2004 he appeared in a Richard Anconina film, Alive, where he played the role of Henri, a young man with a golden voice who is, nevertheless, not considered suitable for the lead role in a musical. Since his film career continued after this, he returned home, where he studied communication while working a number of part-time jobs, such as babysitting and helping in a theatre.

== Nouvelle Star ==
Pushed by his family and friends, he decided to try out for the 2006 edition of Nouvelle Star. With an initial audition performance of Strong Enough by Des'ree, he surprised the judges, who did not expect such a quality voice from an admittedly ungainly-looking man. Nicknamed "La Tortue" (The Turtle) by Nouvelle Star judge Marianne James, he proved to be a popular contestant, and on 8 June, was crowned the fourth Nouvelle Star.

=== Performances ===
- Top 24 : "Le jour s'est lève (Jean-Louis Aubert)
- Top 22 : "Strong enough" (Des'ree)
- Top 19 : "Être à la hauteur" (Le Roi Soleil/Emmanuel Moire)
- Top 14 : "Sunny" (Boney M)
- Top 11 : "Où sont les femmes" (Patrick Juvet)
- Top 10 : "True Colors" (Cyndi Lauper)
- Top 9 : "Ça plane pour moi" (Plastic Bertrand)
- Top 8 : "I Am What I Am" (Gloria Gaynor)
- Top 7 : "New York, New York" (Frank Sinatra)
- Top 6 : "Goodbye Marylou" (Michel Polnareff), "I Will Always Love You" (Whitney Houston)
- Top 5 : "My Heart Will Go On" (Céline Dion), "Stayin' Alive" (Bee Gees)
- Top 4 : "Memory" – (Barbra Streisand), "I Want You Back" (The Jackson Five)
- Top 3 : "I'm Still Standing" (Elton John), "Pour ne pas vivre seul" (Dalida)
- Top 2 : "Born to Be Alive" (Patrick Hernandez), "La chanson des vieux amants" (Jacques Brel), "Last Dance" (Donna Summer)
- Top 1 : "Someone New" (Eskobar)

== Career ==
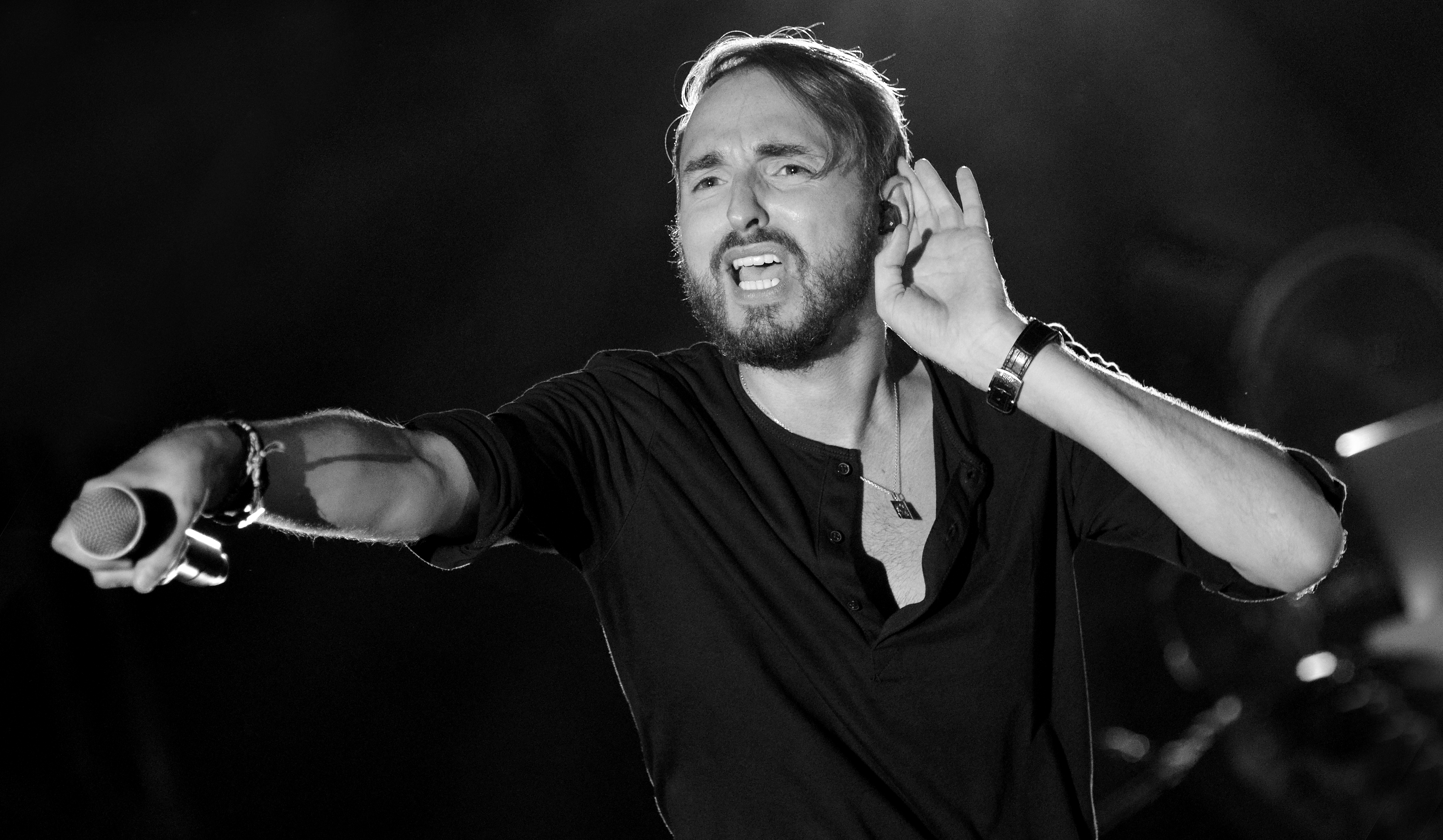
Christophe Willem performing in 2015

His debut album Inventaire was released on 16 April 2007, while the first single, Élu produit de l'année premiered in March.

In May 2007 he released the second single Double Je, which went directly on the #1 in France and Belgium. The third single, Jacques A Dit came out in autumn 2007. The album was well received and sold double platinum in France and gold in Belgium and Switzerland. So far, the album has sold over 1 million copies. Willem started his first tour on 15 November 2007 and it ended on 20 July 2008. He toured France, Belgium, Switzerland and the Overseas departments and territories of France, such as Réunion, Mauritius and even New Caledonia. He also sang several times in Paris at L'Olympia and Zenith, which are the most prestigious concert halls in Paris.

In 2007 Christophe Willem appeared on the list of the 10 musicians who earn the most in France (including income, record sales, concerts and contract). Christophe Willem was in 6th place and earned a total of 1.22 million euros in 2007.

He joined artists such as Tears for Fears, Lara Fabian, and Murray Head on the Night of the Proms tour 2007.

His second album, Caféine, was published on 25 May 2009 and the album's first single was Berlin. The second single was Plus Que Tout and the third Heartbox.

Caféine went immediately to #1 in France.

In 2010, he joined the jury of French version of X Factor.

His third album, entitled Prismophonic was released a month and a day (21 November 2011) after the first single Cool (20 September 2011). The second single from the album is called Si Mes Larmes Tombent (January 2012)

In 2018, he served as one of the domestic judges for Destination Eurovision, the French national selection for the Eurovision Song Contest 2018. He will also join the French commentary team for the contest, teaming up with André Manoukian for the semifinals, as well Stéphane Bern and 2017 French representative Alma for the final.

== Philanthropy ==
Willem is a member of the Les Enfoirés charity ensemble since 2008.

== Discography ==
=== Albums ===
Year	Album	Date of release	Chart				
Year	Album	Date of release	FRA	FRA (DD)	BEL (FL)	BEL (WA)	SWI
2007	Inventaire	16 April 2007	1	1	—	1	7
2007	Inventaire tout en acoustic	23 November 2007	22	6	—	—	—
2009	Caféine	25 May 2009	1	1	—	2	10
2011	Prismophonic	21 November 2011	3	4	—	5	47
2014	Paraît-il	1 December 2014	17	—	200	12	51
2017	Rio	29 September 2017	7	—	—	8	43
2022	Panorama	16 September 2022	6	—	—	2	—

=== Singles ===
Year	Single	Chart				Album
Year	Single	FRA	FRA (DD)	BEL (WA)	SWI	Album
2006	"Sunny"	3	2	9	17	—
2007	"Élu produit de l'année"	—	2	29	—	Inventaire
2007	"Double je"	1	1	1	21	Inventaire
2007	"Jacques a dit"	4	7	1	35	Inventaire
2008	"Quelle chance / September"	9	—	24	—	Inventaire
2009	"Berlin"	—	5	8	57	Caféine
2009	"Plus que tout"	—	2	6	53	Caféine
2009	"Heartbox"	—	—	—	—	Caféine
2010	"Entre nous et le sol"	—	—	—	—	Caféine
2011	"Cool"	29	—	—	—	Prismophonic
2012	"Si mes larmes tombent"	56	—	10	—	Prismophonic
2012	"Starlite"	—	—	—	—	Prismophonic
2013	"What Did I Do" (with Sophie Delila)	110	—	—	—	What Did I Do EP
2014	"Le chagrin"	52	—	—	—	Paraît-il
2014	"L'été en hiver"	137	—	—	—	Paraît-il
2015	"Après toi"	93	—	27	—	Paraît-il
2016	"Nous nus"	—	—	47	—	Paraît-il
2017	"Marlon Brando"	29	—	25	—	Rio
2022	"PS: Je t'aime"	—	—	8	—	Panorama
2022	"J'tomberai pas"	—	—	17	—	Panorama
2023	"Je tourne en rond"	—	—	23	—	Panorama
2026	"Systaime"	—	—	17	—	Non-album single

=== DVD ===
- 2008 : Fermeture pour rénovation (#1 in France and #1 in Belgium)

== Awards ==
Year	Awards	Category
2008	NRJ Music Awards	"Discovery of the year"
2008	NRJ Music Awards	for "Inventaire"
2008	Victoires de la Musique	for "Double Je"
2010	NRJ Music Awards	for "Best French male artist of the year"
2010	NRJ Music Awards	for "Caféine"
