= List of number-one singles of 2007 (France) =

This is a list of the French SNEP Top 100 Singles, Top 50 Digital Singles, Top 200 Albums and Top 50 Digital Albums number-ones of 2007.

== Number-ones by week ==
=== Singles charts ===
On the singles chart (top 100), there were twenty songs which spent at least one week at the first position, which is the highest turnover at the top of French SNEP Singles Chart on a year. Eleven of them went straight atop. The songs which spent the longest time at number-one are Christophe Willem's "Double Je" and Koxie's "Garçon", with seven weeks. The highest weekly sales were performed by Grégory Lemarchal's "De temps en temps" in its first week of release, with over 76,000 sales, while the lowest weekly sales are carried out by Nelly Furtado's "Say It Right" with about 7,100 copies sold. The biggest jump to number one was for Mika's hit "Relax, Take It Easy" which climbed directly from No. 70 to No. 1 on the chart edition of 7 July 2007. The longest chart run for a number-one single was performed by "Marly-Gomont" with 39 weeks in the top 100, and the shorter one by "On s'attache", which remained for only six weeks in the top 100. Fatal Bazooka was the sole artist to rank three singles at number-one on that year.

Week	Issue date	Physical singles		Digital singles	
Week	Issue date	Artist	Title	Artist	Title
1	6 January	Fatal Bazooka	"Fous ta cagoule"	Fatal Bazooka	"Fous ta cagoule"
2	13 January	Fatal Bazooka	"Fous ta cagoule"	Fatal Bazooka	"Fous ta cagoule"
3	20 January	Kamini	"Marly-Gomont"	Vitaa	"À fleur de toi"
4	27 January	Kamini	"Marly-Gomont"	Vitaa	"À fleur de toi"
5	3 February	Kamini	"Marly-Gomont"	Calogero	"Le saut de l'ange"
6	10 February	Kamini	"Marly-Gomont"	Fatal Bazooka & Vitoo	"Mauvaise foi nocturne"
7	17 February	Yannick Noah	"Aux arbres citoyens"	Fatal Bazooka & Vitoo	"Mauvaise foi nocturne"
8	24 February	Yannick Noah	"Aux arbres citoyens"	Mika	"Relax, Take It Easy"
9	3 March	Yannick Noah	"Aux arbres citoyens"	Mika	"Relax, Take It Easy"
10	10 March	Fatal Bazooka & Vitoo	"Mauvaise foi nocturne"	Mika	"Relax, Take It Easy"
11	17 March	Fatal Bazooka & Vitoo	"Mauvaise foi nocturne"	Mika	"Relax, Take It Easy"
12	24 March	Fatal Bazooka & Vitoo	"Mauvaise foi nocturne"	Mika	"Relax, Take It Easy"
13	31 March	Fatal Bazooka & Vitoo	"Mauvaise foi nocturne"	Mika	"Relax, Take It Easy"
14	7 April	Fatal Bazooka & Vitoo	"Mauvaise foi nocturne"	Mika	"Relax, Take It Easy"
15	14 April	Cascada	"Miracle"	Mika	"Relax, Take It Easy"
16	21 April	Celine Dion	"Et s'il n'en restait qu'une (je serais celle-là)"	Christophe Willem	"Double Je"
17	28 April	Beyoncé & Shakira	"Beautiful Liar"	Christophe Willem	"Double Je"
18	5 May	Tony Parker	"Balance-toi"	Mika	"Relax, Take It Easy"
19	12 May	Beyoncé & Shakira	"Beautiful Liar"	Mika	"Relax, Take It Easy"
20	19 May	Christophe Maé	"On s'attache"	Mika	"Relax, Take It Easy"
21	26 May	Nelly Furtado	"Say It Right"	Mika	"Relax, Take It Easy"
22	2 June	Christophe Willem	"Double je"	Christophe Willem	"Double je"
23	9 June	Christophe Willem	"Double je"	Christophe Willem	"Double je"
24	16 June	Grégory Lemarchal	"De temps en temps"	Christophe Willem	"Double je"
25	23 June	Christophe Willem	"Double je"	Christophe Willem	"Double je"
26	30 June	Christophe Willem	"Double je"	Christophe Willem	"Double je"
27	7 July	Mika	"Relax, Take It Easy"	Mika	"Relax, Take It Easy"
28	14 July	Mika	"Relax, Take It Easy"	Christophe Willem	"Double Je"
29	21 July	Christophe Willem	"Double Je"	Mika	"Relax, Take It Easy"
30	28 July	Christophe Willem	"Double Je"	David Guetta	"Love Is Gone"
31	4 August	Christophe Willem	"Double Je"	Mika	"Love Today"
32	11 August	Patrick Fiori, Jean-Jacques Goldman & Christine Ricol	"4 Mots sur un piano"	David Guetta	"Love Is Gone"
33	18 August	Patrick Fiori, Jean-Jacques Goldman & Christine Ricol	"4 Mots sur un piano"	Julien Doré	"Moi Lolita"
34	25 August	Koxie	"Garçon"	Julien Doré	"Moi Lolita"
35	1 September	Koxie	"Garçon"	Julien Doré	"Moi Lolita"
36	8 September	Koxie	"Garçon"	Koxie	"Garçon"
37	15 September	Koxie	"Garçon"	Koxie	"Garçon"
38	22 September	Koxie	"Garçon"	Rihanna	"Don't Stop the Music"
39	29 September	Koxie	"Garçon"	Rihanna	"Don't Stop the Music"
40	6 October	Koxie	"Garçon"	Rihanna	"Don't Stop the Music"
41	13 October	Ora Mate	"Kamate"	Rihanna	"Don't Stop the Music"
42	20 October	Melissa M	"Elle"	Rihanna	"Don't Stop the Music"
43	27 October	Rihanna	"Don't Stop the Music"	Rihanna	"Don't Stop the Music"
44	3 November	Rihanna	"Don't Stop the Music"	Rihanna	"Don't Stop the Music"
45	10 November	Sheryfa Luna	"Quelque part"	Rihanna	"Don't Stop the Music"
46	17 November	Sheryfa Luna	"Quelque part"	Rihanna	"Don't Stop the Music"
47	24 November	Sheryfa Luna	"Quelque part"	Rihanna	"Don't Stop the Music"
48	1 December	Sheryfa Luna	"Quelque part"	Rihanna	"Don't Stop the Music"
49	8 December	Fatal Bazooka & Yelle	"Parle à ma main"	Rihanna	"Don't Stop the Music"
50	15 December	Fatal Bazooka & Yelle	"Parle à ma main"	Yael Naïm	"New Soul"
51	22 December	Fatal Bazooka & Yelle	"Parle à ma main"	Yael Naïm	"New Soul"
52	29 December	Fatal Bazooka & Yelle	"Parle à ma main"	Yael Naïm	"New Soul"

=== Albums chart ===
Week	Issue date	Physical albums		Digital albums	
Week	Issue date	Artist	Title	Artist	Title
1	6 January	Yannick Noah	Charango	Yannick Noah	Charango
2	13 January	Bénabar	Reprise des négociations	Maurane	Si aujourd'hui
3	20 January	Carla Bruni	No Promises	Carla Bruni	No Promises
4	27 January	Michel Delpech	Michel Delpech &	AaRON	Artificial Animals Riding on Neverland
5	3 February	Norah Jones	Not Too Late	Norah Jones	Not Too Late
6	10 February	Vitaa	À fleur de toi	Zazie	Totem
7	17 February	Zazie	Totem	Zazie	Totem
8	24 February	Indochine	Hanoi	Air	Pocket Symphony
9	3 March	Les Enfoirés	La Caravane des Enfoirés	Les Enfoirés	La Caravane des Enfoirés
10	10 March	Les Enfoirés	La Caravane des Enfoirés	Les Enfoirés	La Caravane des Enfoirés
11	17 March	Les Enfoirés	La Caravane des Enfoirés	Calogero	Pomme C
12	24 March	Les Enfoirés	La Caravane des Enfoirés	Mika	Life in Cartoon Motion
13	31 March	Les Enfoirés	La Caravane des Enfoirés	Mika	Life in Cartoon Motion
14	7 April	Mika	Life in Cartoon Motion	Mika	Life in Cartoon Motion
15	14 April	Mika	Life in Cartoon Motion	Christophe Willem	Inventaire
16	21 April	Christophe Willem	Inventaire	Christophe Willem	Inventaire
17	28 April	Christophe Willem	Inventaire	Christophe Willem	Inventaire
18	5 May	Christophe Willem	Inventaire	Christophe Willem	Inventaire
19	12 May	Christophe Willem	Inventaire	Björk	Volta
20	19 May	Linkin Park	Minutes to Midnight	Linkin Park	Minutes to Midnight
21	26 May	Celine Dion	D'Elles	Celine Dion	D'Elles
22	2 June	Celine Dion	D'Elles	Christophe Willem	Inventaire
23	9 June	Christophe Willem	Inventaire	Francis Cabrel	L'essentiel 1977 – 2007
24	16 June	Johnny Hallyday	La Cigale (2006)	Justice	†
25	23 June	Grégory Lemarchal	La Voix d'un ange	Grégory Lemarchal	La Voix d'un ange
26	30 June	Grégory Lemarchal	La Voix d'un ange	Grégory Lemarchal	La Voix d'un ange
27	7 July	Grégory Lemarchal	La Voix d'un ange	Mika	Life in Cartoon Motion
28	14 July	Grégory Lemarchal	La Voix d'un ange	Mika	Life in Cartoon Motion
29	21 July	Mika	Life in Cartoon Motion	Mika	Life in Cartoon Motion
30	28 July	Mika	Life in Cartoon Motion	Mika	Life in Cartoon Motion
31	4 August	Mika	Life in Cartoon Motion	Mika	Life in Cartoon Motion
32	11 August	Mika	Life in Cartoon Motion	Mika	Life in Cartoon Motion
33	18 August	Mika	Life in Cartoon Motion	Mika	Life in Cartoon Motion
34	25 August	Mika	Life in Cartoon Motion	Amy Winehouse	Back to Black
35	1 September	Ben Harper & The Innocent Criminals	Lifeline	Vanessa Paradis	Divinidylle
36	8 September	Vanessa Paradis	Divinidylle	Vanessa Paradis	Divinidylle
37	15 September	Vanessa Paradis	Divinidylle	Vanessa Paradis	Divinidylle
38	22 September	James Blunt	All the Lost Souls	James Blunt	All the Lost Souls
39	29 September	James Blunt	All the Lost Souls	Katie Melua	Pictures
40	6 October	James Blunt	All the Lost Souls	Katie Melua	Pictures
41	13 October	James Blunt	All the Lost Souls	Aṣa	Aṣa
42	20 October	James Blunt	All the Lost Souls	Yael Naim	Yael Naim
43	27 October	LIM	Délinquant	Britney Spears	Blackout
44	3 November	Amy Winehouse	Back to Black	Étienne Daho	L'invitation
45	10 November	Jenifer	Lunatique	Johnny Hallyday	Le Cœur d'un homme
46	17 November	Johnny Hallyday	Le Cœur d'un homme	Daft Punk	Alive 2007
47	24 November	Johnny Hallyday	Le Cœur d'un homme	Daft Punk	Alive 2007
48	1 December	Johnny Hallyday	Le Cœur d'un homme	Daft Punk	Alive 2007
49	8 December	Johnny Hallyday	Le Cœur d'un homme	Alicia Keys	As I Am
50	15 December	Johnny Hallyday	Le Cœur d'un homme	Christophe Maé	Live Session
51	22 December	Christophe Maé	Mon paradis	Amy Winehouse	Back to Black
52	29 December	Christophe Maé	Mon paradis	Radiohead	In Rainbows

== See also ==
- 2007 in music
- List of number-one hits (France)
- List of artists who reached number one on the French Singles Chart
