= List of Ultratop 40 number-one singles of 2008 =

This is a list of songs that topped the Belgian Walloon (francophone) Ultratop 40 in 2008.

Date	Artist	Title
January 5	Rihanna	"Don't Stop the Music"
January 12	Rihanna	"Don't Stop the Music"
January 19	Rihanna	"Don't Stop the Music"
January 26	Rihanna	"Don't Stop the Music"
February 2	Yael Naïm	"New Soul"
February 9	Yael Naïm	"New Soul"
February 16	Fatal Bazooka featuring Yelle	"Parle à ma main"
February 23	Fatal Bazooka featuring Yelle	"Parle à ma main"
March 1	Fatal Bazooka featuring Yelle	"Parle à ma main"
March 8	Fatal Bazooka featuring Yelle	"Parle à ma main"
March 15	Yael Naim	"New Soul"
March 22	Sheryfa Luna	"Il avait les mots"
March 29	Sheryfa Luna	"Il avait les mots"
April 5	Sheryfa Luna	"Il avait les mots"
April 12	Sheryfa Luna	"Il avait les mots"
April 19	Sheryfa Luna	"Il avait les mots"
April 26	Madonna featuring Justin Timberlake	"4 Minutes"
May 3	Madonna featuring Justin Timberlake	"4 Minutes"
May 10	Madonna featuring Justin Timberlake	"4 Minutes"
May 17	Madonna featuring Justin Timberlake	"4 Minutes"
May 24	Madonna featuring Justin Timberlake	"4 Minutes"
May 31	Laurent Wolf	"No Stress"
June 7	Laurent Wolf	"No Stress"
June 14	Laurent Wolf	"No Stress"
June 21	Enrique Iglesias featuring Nâdiya	"Tired of Being Sorry (Laisse le destin l'emporter)"
June 28	Enrique Iglesias featuring Nâdiya	"Tired of Being Sorry (Laisse le destin l'emporter)"
July 5	Enrique Iglesias featuring Nâdiya	"Tired of Being Sorry (Laisse le destin l'emporter)"
July 12	Enrique Iglesias featuring Nâdiya	"Tired of Being Sorry (Laisse le destin l'emporter)"
July 19	Amy Macdonald	"This Is The Life"
July 26	Amy Macdonald	"This Is The Life"
August 2	Amy Macdonald	"This Is The Life"
August 9	Amy Macdonald	"This Is The Life"
August 16	Amy Macdonald	"This Is The Life"
August 23	Amy Macdonald	"This Is The Life"
August 30	Mylène Farmer	"Dégénération"
September 6	Amy Macdonald	"This Is The Life"
September 13	Amy Macdonald	"This Is The Life"
September 20	William Baldé	"Rayon de soleil"
September 27	William Baldé	"Rayon de soleil"
October 4	MC Solaar	"Le Rabbi Mufin"
October 11	MC Solaar	"Le Rabbi Mufin"
October 18	MC Solaar	"Le Rabbi Mufin"
October 25	Madcon	"Beggin'"
November 1	MC Solaar	"Le Rabbi Mufin"
November 8	Grégoire	"Toi + moi"
November 15	Grégoire	"Toi + moi"
November 22	Grégoire	"Toi + moi"
November 29	Grégoire	"Toi + moi"
December 6	Grégoire	"Toi + moi"
December 13	Grégoire	"Toi + moi"
December 20	Grégoire	"Toi + moi"
December 27	Grégoire	"Toi + moi"

== Best-selling singles ==
This is the ten best-selling/performing singles in 2008.

Pos.	Artist	Title	HP	Weeks
1	Fatal Bazooka ft. Yelle	"Parle à ma main"	1	19
2	Rihanna	"Don't Stop the Music"	1	21
3	Amy Macdonald	"This Is the Life"	1	35
4	Laurent Wolf	"No Stress"	1	32
5	Timbaland Pres. OneRepublic	"Apologize"	2	19
6	Yael Naim	"New Soul"	1	22
7	Sheryfa Luna	"Il avait les mots"	1	25
8	Enrique Iglesias ft. Nâdiya	"Tired of Being Sorry"	1	25
9	Mondotek	"Alive!"	2	28
10	Jenifer	"Tourner ma page"	3	14

== See also ==
- 2008 in music
