= T'as vu =

Studio album by Fatal Bazooka
- Released: May 28, 2007
- Genre: Hip hop, R&B
- Length: 65:53
- Label: Up Music

T'as vu ? (French pronunciation: [t‿ɑ vy]; lit. 'You saw?') is an album by French parody rap group Fatal Bazooka. It released in 2007 and contains 19 songs, five of which were released as singles : "Fous ta cagoule", "Mauvaise foi nocturne", "J'aime trop ton boule", "Trankillement" and "Parle à ma main".

== Track listing ==
1. "Intro: T'As Vu" ("Did you see") - 1:37
2. "Fous ta cagoule" (Literally: "Put your hood on") - 3:25
3. "Viens Bégère" ("Come beger") - 3:47
4. "J'aime trop ton boule" ("Thumbnail Watch") - 3:37
5. "Mc Chamallow" - 1:06
6. "Viva Bazooka" - 4:37
7. "Saturday Night Kebab" 3:34
8. "Ouais Ma Gueule" ("Yeah my mouth")- 3:42
9. "Ego Trip" - 4:16
10. "Mc Introverti" - 0:39
11. "Mauvaise foi nocturne" (feat. Vitoo) - 6:07
12. "Sale Connasse" ("Dirty asshole) - 3:57
13. "Chienne de Vie" ("Life's a bitch", "Chienne" is the female form for a dog in French) - 3:44
14. "C'est une Pute" ("She's a slut") - 1:34
15. "Auto-Clash" - 4:52
16. "Mc Québec City" - 1:45
17. "Parle à ma main" (feat. Yelle) ("Talk to the hand") - 4:12
18. "Trankillement" ("Quietly") - 3:26
19. "Crêpes au Froment" ("Wheat Pancakes") - 5:56
