= Vincent Desagnat =

French actor

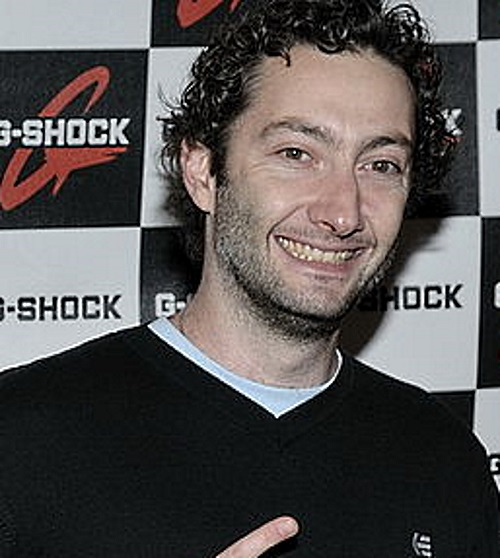
- Desagnat in 2009
- Born: Vincent Raphaël Charles Desagnat; 9 March 1976 (age 50); Paris, France
- Occupations: Actor, television presenter, radio presenter
- Years active: 1998 – present
- Notable credit(s): Morning Live; Menu W9
- Television: M6 (2000–02); Fun TV (2000–02); W9 (2006–13); D17 (2013–15)

Vincent Raphaël Charles Desagnat (French pronunciation: [dəsaɲa]; born 9 March 1976) is a French actor, skateboarder and television and radio presenter.

== Life and career ==
Vincent Desagnat was born in Paris, the youngest son of director and screenwriter Jean-Pierre Desagnat, grandson of actress Francia Séguy, brother of director and screenwriter François Desagnat and of producer and director assistant Olivier Desagnat.

He began his career in 1998 appearing in a music video for French band Manau directed by his brother, and later playing a small role in an episode of the series H.

He then became a radio presenter on Fun Radio and Radio Nova, and co-hosted with Benjamin Morgaine and Michaël Youn the humoristic morning program Morning Live broadcast simultaneously on M6 and Fun TV from July 2000 to March 2002.

In 2002, he released with Benjamin Morgaine and Michaël Youn an album from that program under the name of Bratisla Boys, a parodic boys band issued from one of their sketches on M6. In 2003, the trio released a second album under the name of Conards, for the soundtrack of the film Les 11 commandements. The trio later reunited to create a parody of a rap group named Fatal Bazooka.

From October 2006 to March 2013, he presents and comments with Benjamin Morgaine the program Menu W9 on W9, a condensed version of the Japanese game shows and contests Sushi TV, Takeshi's Castle, Ninja Warrior et Viking: The Ultimate Obstacle Course. He then presented from September 2013 to June 2015 the entertaining program Show ! Le Matin on D17.

Desagnat has appeared in numerous films, including Les 11 commandements, Babysitting, and its sequel Babysitting 2.

== Television programs ==
- 2000–02 : Morning Live on M6 with Michaël Youn and Benjamin Morgaine
- 2006–13 : Menu W9 on W9 with Benjamin Morgaine
- 2013–15 : Show ! Le matin on D17

== Filmography ==
Year	Title	Role	Director	Notes
1998	H	A caregiver	Charles Nemes	TV series (1 episode)
2000	La bostella	Edouard's Fan	Édouard Baer	
2003	La Beuze	Scotch	François Desagnat & Thomas Sorriaux	
2004	Les 11 commandements	Vincent	François Desagnat & Thomas Sorriaux	
2004	Le Carton	Antoine	Charles Nemes	
2005	Iznogoud	A prince	Patrick Braoudé	
2005	Élodie Bradford	Fabrice Saintange	Laurent Carcélès	TV series (1 episode)
2006	Les Aristos	Charles-Edouard	Charlotte de Turckheim	
2006	L'école pour tous	Leroux	Éric Rochant	
2006	Incontrôlable	A lover	Raffy Shart	
2006	Des gens dans mon lit	Nathan	Victoria Cohen	Short
2007	Lascars	The wrestler	Laurent Nicolas	TV series (1 episode)
2008	Skate or Die	Police officer	Miguel Courtois	
2008	15 ans et demi	Radio voice	François Desagnat & Thomas Sorriaux	
2008	Fracassés	Pedro	Franck Llopis	
2008	Les dents de la nuit	Edouard Slippe	Stephen Cafiero & Vincent Lobelle	
2009	Lascars	John Boolman	Emmanuel Klotz & Albert Pereira-Lazaro	
2009	Cyprien	Kiki	David Charhon	
2009	Toute ma vie	The man	Pierre Ferrière	Short
2009	Opération Saint-Esprit	The young man	Séverine Ferrer	Short
2010	Fatal	Pedro Summer	Michaël Youn	
2010	Le pas Petit Poucet	The ogre	Christophe Campos	TV movie
2011	Au bistro du coin	Jeremy	Charles Nemes	
2011	De l'huile sur le feu	The dredger	Nicolas Benamou	
2012	Yes We Can	Jordan	Olivier Abbou	TV movie
2012	Cher radin	Laurent	Didier Albert	TV movie
2013	La vraie vie des profs	Monsieur Amazou	Emmanuel Klotz & Albert Pereira-Lazaro	
2014	Babysitting	Ernest	Nicolas Benamou & Philippe Lacheau	
2014	Le jeu de la vérité	The comedian	François Desagnat	
2015	Babysitting 2	Ernest	Nicolas Benamou & Philippe Lacheau	
2015	Foudroyés	The fiancé	Bibo Bergeron	Short
2015	Scènes de ménages: Enfin en vacances, à la mer	Philippe	Karim Adda & Francis Duquet	TV movie
2016	Roommates Wanted	Roméro	François Desagnat	
2016	À fond	Chief Officer Besauce	Nicolas Benamou	
2016	Scènes de ménages: Enfin en vacances, à la campagne	Philippe	Karim Adda & Francis Duquet	TV movie
2017	Alibi.com	Romain	Philippe Lacheau	
2017	The New Adventures of Cinderella	Prince Gilbert	Lionel Steketee	
2017	Rattrapage	The CPE	Tristan Séguéla	
2017	Scènes de ménages: ça va être leur fête	Philippe	Francis Duquet	TV movie
2018	Christ(Off)	Joseph	Pierre Dudan	
2018	Raoul Taburin	Sauveur Bilongue	Pierre Godeau	
2018	Comment tuer sa mère	Nico	David Diane & Morgan Spillemaecker	
2018	Les aventures de Spirou et Fantasio	Claude	Alexandre Coffre	
2018	Groom	The dictator	Théodore Bonnet	TV series (1 episode)

== Theater ==
Year	Title	Author	Director
2011	Fume cette cigarette	Emmanuel Robert-Espalieu	Édouard Molinaro
2017	Merci pour le bruit	Charlotte Gabris	Sarah Lelouch
2018	L'Ordre des choses	Marc Fayet	Richard Berry
