= Le Frunkp =

Single by Alphonse Brown
- B-side: "Instrumental"
- Released: January 2003
- Recorded: 2002
- Genre: Pop
- Length: 3:22
- Label: Pathé Marcony, Warner Music
- Songwriters: Raphaël Mussard, Michaël Youn
- Producer: PGD

Michael Youn singles chronology
"It's Kyz My Life" (2002)	"Le Frunkp" (2003)	"Comme des conards" (2004)

"Le Frunkp" is a 2002 song performed by the fictional character Alphonse Brown (portrayed by Michaël Youn), the "unknown son" of James Brown, who tries to start his own career by creating a new (fictional) style called "Frunkp" (a mixture of funk and rap), in French film La Beuze, written by Youn and Desagnat. The music video shows images from film.

The song became a hit, topping the charts in all countries where it was released. As of August 2014, the song was the 16th best-selling single of the 21st century in France, with 573,000 units sold.

== Track listings ==
=== CD single ===
1. "Le Frunkp" — 3:22
2. "Le Frunkp" (instrumental) — 3:30

=== 12" maxi ===
1. "Le Frunkp" — 3:22
2. "Le Frunkp" (instrumental) — 3:30
3. "Le Frunkp" (a cappella) — 3:22

== Certifications ==
Country	Certification	Date	Sales certified
Belgium	Platinum	April 26, 2003	40,000
France	Platinum	March 12, 2003	500,000

== Charts ==
Chart (2003)	Peak position
Belgian (Wallonia) Singles Chart	1
French SNEP Singles Chart	1
Swiss Singles Chart	1

End of year chart (2003)	Position
Belgian (Wallonia) Singles Chart	1
French Singles Chart	5
Swiss Singles Chart	19
