= Parle à ma main =

Single by Fatal Bazooka featuring Yelle

from the album T'as vu
- B-side: "Auto-Clash"
- Released: October 15, 2007
- Recorded: France, 2006
- Genre: Dance-pop, R&B, hip hop, parody
- Length: 3:40
- Label: Warner Music, Up Music
- Songwriters: Nicolas Brisson; Dominique Gauriaud; William Geslin; Jurij Prette; Michaël Youn
- Producers: Dominique Gauriaud; William Geslin; Jurij Prette; Michaël Youn

Fatal Bazooka singles chronology
"Tranquillement" (2007)	"Parle à ma main" (2007)

Yelle singles chronology
"A cause des garçons" (2007)	"Parle à ma main" (2007)	"Ce jeu" (2008)

Music video
- "Parle à ma main" on YouTube

"Parle à ma main" (French for "Talk to my hand") is a song recorded by French act Fatal Bazooka featuring Yelle and released on October 15, 2007. It was the fifth and last single from the album T'as vu. It was particularly successful in France and Belgium (Wallonia), where it was a number one hit for many weeks.

== Music video ==
In the music video, David Guetta's hit single "Love Is Gone" can be heard at the beginning and is sung by Fatal Bazooka (portrayed by Michaël Youn). French actor Vincent Desagnat features in the video, while French singers Vitaa and Diam's are mentioned in the lyrics. A sequence in a gymnasium is inspired by the music video for Gwen Stefani's "Hollaback Girl," particularly in the featuring of a brass band and some majorettes.

== Chart performance ==
In France, the single entered the singles chart at number two on 1 December 2007, then climbed to number one and stayed there for seven weeks. Then after three weeks at number two, it dropped quickly. It totaled 13 weeks in the top ten, 16 weeks in the top 50 and 19 weeks on the chart (top 100).

In Belgium (Wallonia), "Parle à ma main" charted for 22 weeks in the top 40 from 15 December 2007. It started at number 24, reached the top ten two weeks later, and eventually topped the chart for four weeks. It remained in the top ten for 16 weeks .

It achieved a moderate success in Switzerland. It charted for 17 weeks, with a peak at number 31 in its third week, on 9 December 2007.

== Awards ==
In 2008, the song won a NRJ Music Awards for the category "Music video of the year".

== Track listings ==
CD single

1. "Parle à ma main" — 3:40
2. "Auto-Clash" by Fatal Bazooka — 4:53

Digital download

1. "Parle à ma main" — 3:40

== Charts ==
=== Weekly charts ===
Chart (2007–2008)	Peak position
Belgian (Wallonia) Singles Chart	1
Eurochart Hot 100	4
French SNEP Singles Chart	1
Swiss Singles Chart	31

=== Year-end charts ===
Chart (2007)	Position
French Singles Chart	11
Chart (2008)	Position
Belgian (Wallonia) Singles Chart	1
Eurochart Hot 100	26
French Singles Chart	8

== Certifications ==
Country	Certification	Date	Sales certified
Belgium	Gold	26 April 2007	20,000

== See also ==
- List of number-one hits of 2007 (France)
- Ultratop 40 number-one hits of 2008
