= In a Man's Womb =

Studio album by Yael Naïm
- Released: November 9, 2001
- Recorded: 2001
- Genre: R&B, soul
- Label: EMI
- Producer: Yael Naïm, Kamil Rustam

Yael Naïm chronology
In a Man's Womb (2001)	Yael Naïm (2007)

In a Man's Womb is the debut solo album released by French-Israeli singer-songwriter Yael Naïm, which was released under only the name Yael.

The album was her only release through EMI. She left the label after the album's release, stating that she was frustrated with the label: "I was young and became very disappointed in the system."

== Track listing ==
1. "Cross"
2. "In a Man's Womb"
3. "Maître De Mes Rêves"
4. "Alone"
5. "In the Desert"
6. "Hit (Bla...Bla...)"
7. "Ils Prétendent"
8. "Books"
9. "Ça Ne Fait Rien"
10. "Do I Do"
11. "Silence"
12. "Sharvulim"
13. "Avril"

== Credits ==
The album was recorded in Los Angeles and produced by Kamil Rustam and Yael Naïm.
