= Les 11 commandements =

- Les 11 Commandements film poster
- Directed by: François Desagnat; Thomas Sorriaux
- Written by: Vincent Desagnat; Romain Lévy; Benjamin Morgaine; Michaël Youn; Laurent Zeitoun
- Produced by: Antonin Dedet; Abel Nahmias
- Starring: Michaël Youn; Vincent Desagnat; Benjamin Morgaine
- Cinematography: David Quesemand
- Edited by: Marco Cavé
- Production company: M6 Films
- Distributed by: Pathé
- Release date: February 4, 2004 (France)
- Running time: 85 minutes
- Country: France
- Language: French
- Budget: $4.8 million
- Box office: $20.5 million

Les 11 commandements (or The 11 Commandments in English speaking countries) is a French comedy film, made in 2004, featuring Michaël Youn. It is comparable to the American TV series Jackass. It was theatrically released in France in February 2004 and led the French box office in its first week of release.

== Plot ==
Variety's review of the film describes its plot as "Six lads. . . embark on idiotic physical challenges at the behest of the God of Jokes (Dieudonné), to restore mirth to a morose planet." The crew of stuntmen and pranksters have to perform 11 commandments (which are like tasks or tests). These tasks include:

- Being a "wall", while Djibril Cissé strikes footballs into them
- Seeing who can obtain the highest penalty by annoying the local law enforcement officers (this is an ongoing contest between casts throughout the film, inserts are shown between commandments)
- Converting a villa into a swimming pool by blocking all the exits and flooding it
- Rollerskating or inline skating after taking sleeping pills
- Competing against each other on a racing track dressed as penises
- Devastating a supermarket after starting using ketchup jets on bystanders and on each other
- Playing beach volleyball while under the influence of Viagra
- Eating the second hottest chili in the world
- Singing a country and western song in the middle of library in Paris
- Trying to serve food in a restaurant after voluntarily altering their balance
- Ploughing a penis into a corn field
- Driving around a town dressed as Adolf Hitler
- Recreating a medieval duel while riding airplane staircases
- Delivering pizza with a surprise - the surprise being an instant party of around 50 people
- Riding completely nude mocking a romantic video clip
- Performing ballet in zero gravity
- Ruining a van by eating junk food and proceeding to clean it up by filling it with foam
- Playing the bagpipes while riding an ostrich
- Sneaking farm animals into an upper-class hotel
- Having a picnic on a tennis court while Amélie Mauresmo is serving tennis balls at them
- Performing a particular song against the sporting event host and being booed by the audience
- Riding an astronaut training centrifuge while being inebriated
- Performing a "My Sharona" adaption while blocking a street
- Playing escalating practical pranks on each other during credits (as outtakes)

== Cast ==
- Michaël Youn : Mike
- Vincent Desagnat : Vincent
- Benjamin Morgaine : Ben
- William Geslin : Willy
- Tefa : Tefa
- Dieudonné : The God of Jokes
- Gad Elmaleh : Gad
- Jurij Prette : Yuri
- Patrick Timsit : Toto / Fifou
- Djibril Cissé : Himself
- Amélie Mauresmo : Herself
- Gad Elmaleh : Himself
- Delphine de Turckheim : A policewoman

== See also ==
- CKY
- The Dudesons
- Dirty Sanchez
- Too Stupid to Die
- Tokyo Shock Boys
