= Fous ta cagoule =

Single by Fatal Bazooka

from the album T'As Vu ?
- B-side: "Playmobitch dirty south remix"
- Released: 18 November 2006
- Recorded: 2006
- Genre: Comedy rap
- Length: 3:25
- Label: Warner Music
- Songwriter(s): Dominique Gauriaud, William Geslin, Jurij Prette, Nicolas Brisson, V. Desagnat, B. Morgaine, M. Balanca, Michaël Youn
- Producer(s): Dominique Gauriaud, William Geslin, Jurij Prette, Michaël Youn

Michaël Youn singles chronology
"Iznogoud" (2005)	"Fous ta cagoule" (2006)	"Mauvaise Foi Nocturne" (2007)

Music video
- "Fous ta cagoule" on YouTube

"Fous ta cagoule" (French pronunciation: [fu ta kaɡul]; lit. '"Put your balaclava on"') is a 2006 song by comedy rap character Fatal Bazooka, the 1st single from album T'as vu released on 2007. This song achieved a huge success in France and Belgium.

== Background and writing ==
The group transposes the urban style into the setting of the snow-covered mountains of Savoy, and caricatures certain French rappers there. The music video was produced by Nicolas Benamou.

The single peaked at #1 in France in January 2007. As of August 2014, the song was the 31st best-selling single of the 21st century in France, with 488,500 units sold.

== Description ==
Two rappers are cold while in the French department of Savoy. To avoid getting sick, they put a ski mask on and advise others to follow suit.

== See also ==
- List of number-one hits of 2006 (France)
- Ultratop 40 number-one hits of 2006

== Cover versions and parodies ==
This song, by its big hit and its broad diffusion on the music channels and Internet, was the subject of several parodies:

- Christmas 2006, the firemen of the Geneva International Airport turned on the tarmac and in the general headquarter a clip with the song Fous ta cagoule, when their chief was not there. This video, entitled Fatal SA, Fou ta cagoule (also known under Fous ta cagoule, pompier), met a great success on Internet. The men involved in the video were later reprimanded for unauthorized use of fire equipment and degrading the image of the fire department.
- The song was used in a parody video-clip about a Russian city of Perm
- The organizers of the "Morning" of radio operator Le Mouv' have creates a parody of the song, Fous ta capote, at the time of Sidaction 2007.
- At the beginning of 2007, Romano, organizer of radio operator Skyrock which animates at the sides of Difool the Radio Libre the evening and Morning of the morning, carried out a parody of Fous ta cagoule entitled Fous ta perruque in featuring with a listener who had composed the words of this one.
- A true Savoyard group of rap, Posse 33, turned a clip in answer of the tube of Fatal Bazooka: J'fous ma cagoule, where they criticize in particular Michael Youn to make fun of them.
- Fatal Bazooka itself did to a diversion of its own song in the album T'As Vu ?: Crêpes au froment, where the hood is replaced by crepes with wheat of Brittany, to cure the malbouffe.
- In 2008, the song was covered by Gérard Jugnot, Lââm, Michèle Laroque, Marc Lavoine, Nolwenn Leroy, Christophe Maé and Jean-Baptiste Maunier and included in a medley available on Les Enfoirés' album Les Secrets des Enfoirés.
- The song was used at KVN (Russian humour TV show) in 2015.

== Track listings ==
CD single

1. "Fous ta cagoule" (radio edit) — 3:28
2. "Fous ta cagoule" (Playmobitch dirty south remix) — 3:07
3. "Fous ta cagoule" (extended Dedikass mix) — 5:09
4. "Fous ta cagoule" (instrumental mix) — 3:28

Digital download

1. "Fous ta cagoule" (radio edit) — 3:28

== Certifications and sales ==
Region	Certification	Certified units/sales
Belgium (BEA)	Gold	25,000^{*}
France (SNEP)	Platinum	300,000^{*}
^{*} Sales figures based on certification alone.

== Charts ==
Chart (2006/07)	Peak position
Belgian (Wallonia) Singles Chart	1
Eurochart Hot 100	3
French Digital Chart	1
French SNEP Singles Chart	1
Swiss Singles Chart	8

End of year chart (2006)	Position
Belgian (Wallonia) Singles Chart	32
French Singles Chart	2
Swiss Singles Chart	77
End of year chart (2007)	Position
Belgian (Wallonia) Singles Chart	2
French Singles Chart	10
Swiss Singles Chart	68
