= Koxie (singer) =

French singer

Laure Cohen
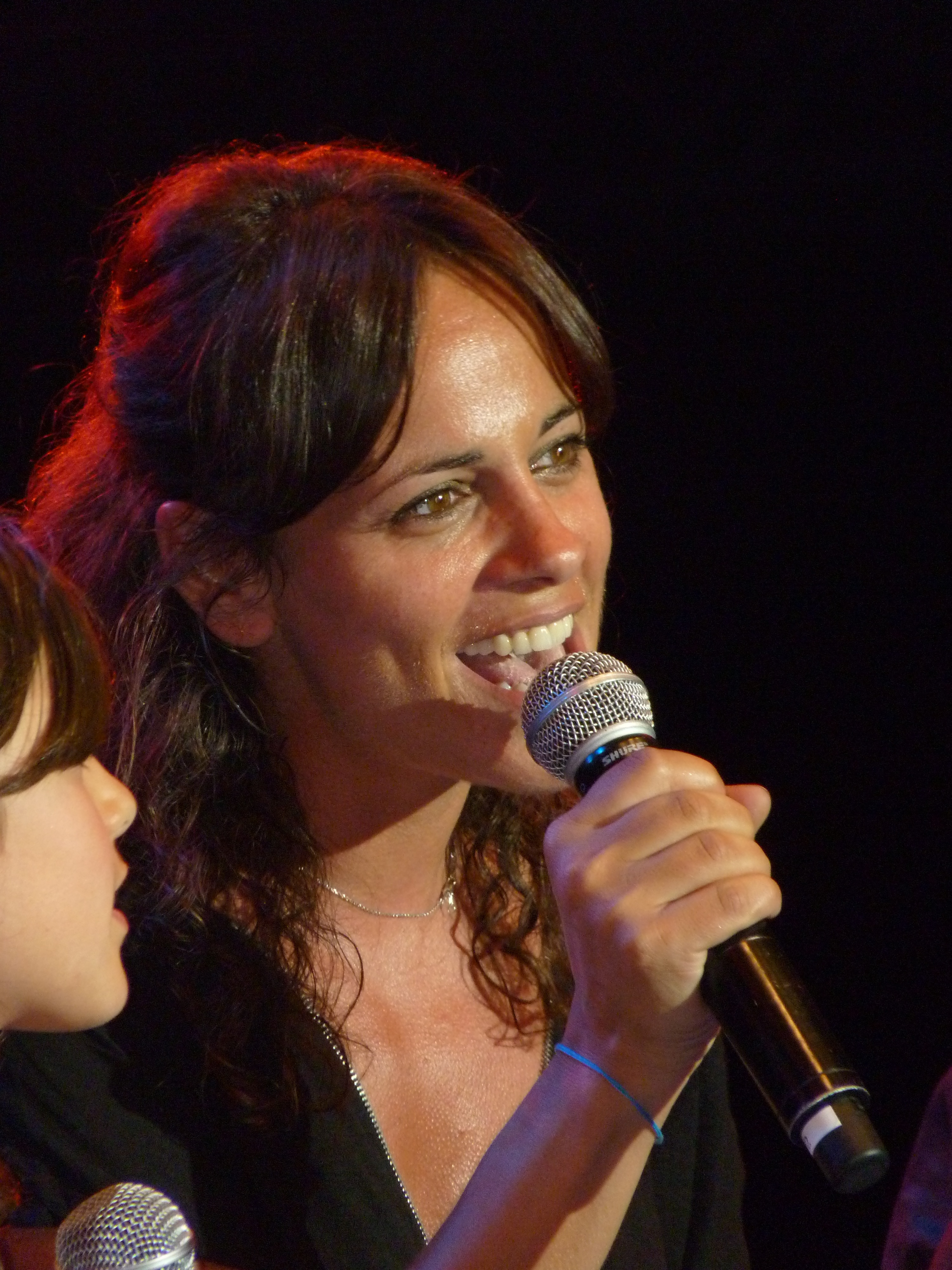
- Cohen in 2012

Background information
- Born: 26 February 1977 (age 49); Paris, France
- Genres: Pop; hip hop
- Occupation: Singer
- Years active: 1998–present

Laure Cohen, known by her stage name Koxie, is a French singer of Tunisian origin, who came to prominence through her 2007 hit "Garçon" that topped the French Official Singles Chart. She was born in Paris on 26 February 1977. She released her self-titled debut album Koxie in 2007. She is signed since June 2007 to AZ French record label affiliated with Universal Music France. She entered politics alongside the far-right candidate Sarah Knafo for the 2026 Paris municipal election.

== Career ==
She started in hip hop music very early. She went to New York where she studied acting and dancing in Broadway Dance Center. Upon graduation, she returned to France opening her own studio FAME in 1998, an arts school covering theater, music, dance and cinema. She has also shot a number of short films, most notably Les Mauvais Joueurs in 2005.

She also worked in the French music station Fun Radio and with radio and TV presenter Arthur in Europe 2. After that she started her solo career with single "Garçon" using sampling of Dr. Dre and speaking against sexism and vulgar lyrics. She was immediately targeted by French radio DJ Difool through the Skyrock radio who launched an anti-Koxie campaign, even launching a mock version of "Garçon" entitled "Gare aux cons" by comedian Axelle Laffont. Still "Garçon" topped the French Official Singles Chart for 2 weeks in August 2007 and was also a hit in Switzerland reaching #44.

Based on her commercial success, Koxie released her studio album Koxie and a follow-up single "Ma meilleure amie". In early 2012, she is releasing her second studio album, with a pre-release single from the forthcoming album under the title "Le prince charmant".

== Discography ==
=== Albums ===
- 2007: Koxie

Track list

1. Intro
2. Rêver de ça koxie
3. Garçon
4. Sortir de l’ombre
5. Ma meilleure amie
6. Seule avec toi
7. Sacré salah
8. Plus de place pour les rêves
9. J’aime
10. Je fais des rimes
11. Femme de football fan
12. Sans essayer
13. La force de croire
- 2012: Le prince charmant

Track list

1. J'écris
2. Daisy Luzion
3. Le destin
4. Le prince charmant
5. Docteur Love
6. Toi
7. Nos enfants
8. Maman
9. Psychanalyste
10. Tant pis pour toi
11. Dealer de caresses

=== Singles ===
- 2007: "Garçon" (#1 in France, #44 in Switzerland)
- 2008: "Ma meilleure amie" (#45 in France)
- 2010: "Daisy Luzion"
- 2011: "Le prince charmant"
