= Comme à la maison =

Live album by Christophe Maé
- Released: 26 September 2008
- Recorded: 18 and 19 June 2008, Corse
- Genre: Pop
- Label: Warner Music

Christophe Maé chronology
Mon paradis (2007)	Comme à la maison (2008)	On trace la route (2010)

Singles from Comme à la maison
- 1. "C'est ma terre" Released: 2008; 2. "Mon p'tit gars" Released: 2008

Comme à la maison is the first live album recorded by French artist Christophe Maé and his second album overall. It was recorded and released in 2008 and met huge success in France and Belgium (Wallonia), both under its CD and DVD versions.

== Background ==
The album was recorded on 18 and 19 June 2008, on a beach in the south of Corsica, and first released on 26 September 2008. It contains songs from his debut album Mon paradis, such as the hit singles "On s'attache", "Parce qu'on sait jamais", "Belle demoiselle", plus some new songs, including a tribute to Bob Marley composed of a medley, and a duet with William Baldé. A gospel-style choir and accordionist Régis Gizavo participated in the concert.

Two songs were released as singles : "C'est ma terre", only available digitally (#18 in Belgium, #91 in Switzerland), and "Mon p'tit gars", dedicated to the singer's son named Jules, which was a number two hit in France (and #33 in Belgium).

== Critical reception and chart performance ==
Professional ratings
Review scores
Source	Rating
AllMusic	3/5 stars

The album was generally well received by the musical critics. AllMusic stated : "While it's disappointing that Comme à la Maison doesn't include more surprises than it does, whether in the form of new material or cover songs, the live performance is still impressive and casts the songs of Mon paradis in a new light, one that highlights Maé's African influence in particular."

The album met great success in France and Belgium (Wallonia) where it topped the charts. In France, it went straight to number-one on 4 October 2008, then dropped quickly, but managed to climb to number-one again in its seventh week, and totaled 18 weeks in the top ten. In Belgium, the album debuted at #3, then topped the chart for two weeks. It stayed for 22 weeks in the top ten.

The DVD was number-one for seven non consecutive weeks in France and Belgium.

== Track listings ==
CD 1

1. "Mon paradis" (live) (Domisseck, Maé) – 7:44
2. "Ma vie est une larme" (live) (Dondrimont, Maé) – 3:54
3. "Va voir ailleurs" (live) (Dondrimont, Maé) – 5:39
4. "On s'attache" (live) (Dondrimont, Florence, Maé) – 5:46
5. "Ça fait mal" (live) (Dondrimont, Maé) – 5:09
6. "Belle demoiselle" (live) (Domisseck) – 4:51
7. "Maman" (live) (Maé, Oricelli) – 5:40
8. "Mon p'tit gars" (live) – 4:03

CD 2

1. "Moi j'ai pas le sou" (live) – 4:08
2. "Sa danse donne" (live) – 3:51
3. "Mon père spirituel" (live) (Maé) – 6:28
4. "Tribute to Bob Marley" (live) – 3:05
5. "Parce qu'on sait jamais" (live) (Florence, Jacquot) – 3:45
6. "C'est ma terre" (live) (Florence, Maé, Oricelli) – 8:46
7. "C'est ma terre" (music video)
8. "Mon père spirituel" (from the DVD live)

DVD - collector version

1. "Mon paradis" (live) – 7:44
2. "Ma vie est une larme" (live) – 3:54
3. "Va voir ailleurs" (live) – 5:39
4. "On s'attache" (live) – 5:46
5. "Ça fait mal" (live) – 5:09
6. "Belle demoiselle" (live) – 4:51
7. "Maman" (live) – 5:40
8. "Mon p'tit gars" (live) – 4:59
9. "Moi j'ai pas le sou" (live - duet with William Baldé) – 4:02
10. "Sa danse donne" (live) – 3:51
11. "Mon père spirituel" (live) – 6:28
12. "Tribute to Bob Marley" (live) – 3:05
13. "Parce qu'on sait jamais" (live) – 3:45
14. "C'est ma terre" (live) – 8:47

Source: Allmusic

== Charts ==
=== Weekly charts ===
Chart (2008/09)	Peak position
Belgian (Wallonia) Albums Chart	1
French Albums Chart	1
Belgian (Wallonia) DVD Chart	1
French DVD Chart	1
Swiss Albums Chart	13

=== Year-end charts ===
End of year chart (2008)	Position
Belgian (Wallonia) Albums Chart	19
French Albums Chart	10
End of year chart (2009)	Position
Belgian (Wallonia) Albums Chart	15

== Release history ==
Date	Label	Country	Format	Catalog
September 26, 2008	Warner Music	Belgium, France, Switzerland	CD	0825646941643
October 31, 2008	Warner Music	Belgium, France, Switzerland	CD + DVD	0825646932498
January 23, 2009	Warner Music	Belgium, France, Switzerland	DVD - Limited edition	0825646914845

== Certifications ==
Certifications for Comme à la maison
Region	Certification	Certified units/sales
Belgium (BEA)	Platinum	30,000^{*}
France (SNEP)	2× Platinum	400,000^{*}
France (SNEP) DVD	3× Platinum	60,000^{*}
Switzerland (IFPI Switzerland)	Gold	15,000^{^}
^{*} Sales figures based on certification alone.^{^} Shipments figures based on certification alone.
