= Sushi TV =

Sushi TV is a comedy clip show showing the best and funniest moments from Japanese game shows over the years. Clips mostly include bizarre eating contests, physical challenges or people's scary and sometimes amazing talents. Some of the highlights on this show have appeared on a Japanese game show edition of Tarrant On TV. Clips originally came from a few well-known Japanese game shows, such as Super Human Coliseum, Live Live Down Town, TV Champions and Lady Boys.

== International versions ==
- United Kingdom — The UK version first aired on Challenge in September 2003. Julian Clary was the presenter, and was seen as a floating head with a unique face paint between clips. Each clip was accompanied with a play along question. The show was revamped in 2004, but still used the same clips from the original run. Julian Clary was replaced by Craig Charles who provided a voice over that was very similar to the style he used for Takeshi's Castle.
- Spain — The Spanish Sushi TV aired on Cuatro. It was presented by Paco Casas and Santiago Urrialde.
- France — A shortened version of Sushi TV aired every weekend from October 2006 on the W9 channel, which also broadcasts Takeshi's Castle in the same show (Menu W9), with voice-overs by comedians Benjamin Morgaine and Vincent Desagnat. Sushi TV was then replaced by Sasuke on the second season of Menu W9 (2007).
- Italy — In Italy the show aired on GXT.
- Australia — The second UK version hosted by Craig Charles aired on The Comedy Channel.
- United States — In 2005, The TV Guide Channel did their own version of Sushi TV which was basically the same format but edited with American hosts. There was also a bonus feature at the end where people will do re-enactments of the features used on the show. Production ended in early 2006 but reruns continued until summer 2007.

== See also ==
- Banzai
