= La Beuze =

2003 French comedy film

- Directed by: François Desagnat; Thomas Sorriaux
- Written by: Philippe de Chauveron; Guy Laurent; Hichem Bonnefoi
- Starring: Michaël Youn; Vincent Desagnat; Zoé Félix
- Production companies: Canal+ M6 Films
- Release date: 5 February 2003
- Running time: 90 minutes
- Country: France
- Language: French
- Budget: €5 million

La Beuze (Eng: The Dope) is a 2003 French comedy film directed by François Desagnat and Thomas Sorriaux.

== Plot ==
Alphonse and Scotch, lifelong friends, discover a stash of cannabis that belonged to the Nazis for human experimentation. Pursued by the French police's narcotics division and the son of a former Nazi seeking the cannabis, they attempt to start a business with their high-quality weed.

== Cast ==
- Michaël Youn as Alphonse Brown
- Vincent Desagnat as Scotch
- Alex Descas as Shaft
- Zoé Félix as Dina
- Jorge Cabezas as Adolfo

== Production and release ==
The budget for the film is estimated at €5 million. It was officially released on February 5, 2003.

== Reception ==
Variety called the film an "irreverent slice of nonsense about two affable losers who are blissfully unaware of their own moronic ineptitude." Abus de Ciné wrote, "to be clear, the film is pitiful, the script nonexistent, the actors are average, and the main character (Mr. Youn) doesn't do the kind of heavy-handed humor we'd expect."
