= Garçon (song) =

Single by Koxie

from the album Koxie
- B-side: "J'aime"
- Released: 25 June 2007 (France)
- Recorded: France
- Length: 3:36
- Label: AZ
- Songwriters: Stephane Bonvent, Koxie, Aurelien Mazin, Charles Aznavour
- Producer: Stéphane Bonvent

Koxie singles chronology
"Garçon" (2007)	"Ma Meilleure Amie" (2008)

"Garçon" is the debut single by French singer Koxie, from her eponymous debut album, on which it features as the third track. It topped the charts of France and Belgium for two months.

== Background ==
"Garçon, si t'enlèves la cédille
Ça fait garcon
Et gare aux cons ma fille
Gare aux cons..."

— Beginning of the refrain

Koxie created her Myspace page with her first single "Garçon" also known under the title "Gare aux cons". The song evokes, with humour, the exasperation of a young woman towards the stupidity (sexism and vulgarity) of some men (boys in the text). The song is based on a Dr. Dre sample, which is itself based on a Charles Aznavour recording.

The song was a huge success online as well as on singles charts. Koxie released the single on the AZ label on 25 June 2007. To promote the song, she performed "Garçon" on many French programmes.

The song is also available on many French compilations, such as Hits 2 en 1 2007 Vol. 3, Hits 2008, Starfloor Vol. 7, NRJ Hit Music Only! 2007 and The Very Best of 2007.

== Music video ==
In the music video, Koxie is on her scooter and is accosted by a black man in a car, accompanied by his friends. This one addresses her vulgar words. Koxie tries to reason with him by saying that it is not a way of speaking to a woman and finally, the man begins crying in her arms, explaining that he acts so because he is incited by his friends.

== Cover versions and parodies ==
A Skyrock listener made "Gare aux thons", a parody of Koxie's song, and broadcast it on YouTube. The French host Cauet covered the song under the title "Coxis".

In 2008, the song was covered by Michèle Laroque, Jean-Baptiste Maunier and Karen Mulder and included in a medley named "Le Match" available on Les Enfoirés' album Les Secrets des Enfoirés. In 2009, French band La Pompe Moderne released its album Greatest Hits with a cover version of "Garçon".

== Chart performance ==
In France, the single debuted at number 11 on 30 June 2007 and reached the top ten the week after. At the end of August, the single peaked number one on the singles chart and remained there for seven weeks. It totaled 22 weeks in the top ten, 26 weeks in the top 50 and 31 weeks on the chart. Certified Platinum disc by the SNEP, the single was the second best-selling single of 2007, with 282,196 copies sold. It was also number one for two weeks on the French Digital Chart, peaking at number 15 on the annual chart. As of July 2014, it is the 91st best-selling single of the 21st century in France, with 318,000 units sold.

The single charted from 1 September 2007 on the Belgian (Wallonia) Ultratop Singles Chart, reached quickly number one. It managed to top the chart for seven not consecutive weeks. It fell off the chart after 24 weeks. The single achieved Gold status and was ranked number 11 on 2007 Belgian End of Year Chart.

The single had a moderate success in Switzerland, peaking only at number 44.

== Track listings ==
- CD single

No.	Title	Length
1.	"Garçon"	3:36
2.	"J'aime"	3:47

- Digital download

No.	Title	Length
1.	"Garçon"	3:36

== Charts and sales ==
=== Weekly charts ===
Chart (2007)	Peak position
Belgian (Wallonia) Singles Chart	1
Eurochart Hot 100	5
French SNEP Singles Chart	1
French Airplay Chart	2
French Digital Chart	1
Swiss Singles Chart	44

=== Year-end charts ===
Chart (2007)	Position
Belgian (Wallonia) Singles Chart	11
French Airplay Chart	76
French Digital Chart	15
French Singles Chart	2
French TV Airplay Chart	11
Chart (2008)	Position
Belgian (Wallonia) Singles Chart	32

=== Certifications and sales ===
Certifications for "Garçon"
Region	Certification	Certified units/sales
Belgium (BRMA)	Gold	25,000^{*}
France (SNEP)	Platinum	300,000^{*}
^{*} Sales figures based on certification alone.
