= On s'attache =

Single by Christophe Maé

from the album Mon paradis
- B-side: "Acoustic version"
- Released: May 2007
- Genre: Pop
- Length: 3:11
- Label: Warner Music
- Songwriter(s): Lionel Florence; Christophe Maé; Bruno Dandrimont
- Producer(s): Volodia

Christophe Maé singles chronology
"On s'attache" (2007)	"Parce qu'on sait jamais" (2007)

"On s'attache" is a 2007 song recorded by French singer Christophe Maé. It was his debut single of his solo career, from his second album Mon paradis. Released in May 2007, the song was successful in France and Belgium (Wallonia), and hit a moderate success in Switzerland.

== Song information ==
The music was composed by Maé and Bruno Dandrimont with lyrics by Maé and Lionel Florence, who had also previously worked for various artists such as Nolwenn Leroy, and Christophe Maé himself. The song, which deals in part with a love relationship in which the man does not want to engage in marriage, was also recorded in a live version in 2008 and was included on Maé's live album Comme à la maison, where it is the fourth track.

In 2008, "On s'attache" won a NRJ Music Awards in the category 'Francophone song of the year'.

In France, the single was directly number-one on the SNEP chart, but dropped very quickly, remaining for four weeks in the top 50 and six weeks in the top 100, because the single was released in a limited edition. On the other hand, the single was the third most downloaded one of 2007.

In Belgium (Wallonia), "On s'attache" was charted for 38 weeks in the Ultratop 40, including a peak at #4 on 16 June and 7 July 2007.

== Track listings ==
CD single

1. "On s'attache" — 3:11
2. "On s'attache" (acoustic version) — 3:01
3. "On s'attache" (making-of of the video)

Digital download

1. "On s'attache" — 3:11
2. "On s'attache" (live) — 5:46

== Charts ==
Chart (2007)	Peak position
Belgian (Wallonia) Singles Chart	4
Eurochart Hot 100	8
French Digital Chart	2
French SNEP Singles Chart	1
Swiss Singles Chart	27

End of year chart (2007)	Position
Belgian (Wallonia) Singles Chart	12
French Airplay Chart	9
French TV Music Videos Chart	15
French Digital Chart	3
French Singles Chart	81
End of year chart (2008)	Position
Belgian (Wallonia) Singles Chart	66

== Certifications ==
Certifications for "On s'attache"
Region	Certification
Belgium (BRMA)	Gold
