= Mon paradis =

Studio album by Christophe Maé
- Released: 19 March 2007
- Genre: Pop
- Label: WEA, Warner Music

Christophe Maé chronology
Mon paradis (2007)	Comme à la maison (2008)

Singles from Mon paradis
- 1. "On s'attache" Released: 2007; 2. "Parce qu'on sait jamais" Released: 2007; 3. "Ça fait mal" Released: 2007; 4. "Belle demoiselle" Released: 2008

Professional ratings
Review scores
Source	Rating
Allmusic	4/5 stars

Mon paradis is the first studio album recorded by Christophe Maé. It was released in 2007 and sold over two million copies worldwide, and topped the chart about ten months after its release. The album remained on the SNEP Chart for two years (133 weeks, 70 of them in the top ten) and on the Ultratop 40 Chart (81 weeks). The first single, "On s'attache", went to number one in France.

== Track listings ==
CD

1. "On s'attache" (Dandrimont, Florence, Mae) – 3:11
2. "Mon paradis" (Domisseck, Mae) – 3:10
3. "Belle demoiselle" (Domisseck) – 3:30
4. "Parce qu'on sait jamais" (Florence, Jacquot) – 3:12
5. "Ça fait mal" (Dandrimont, Mae) – 3:42
6. "L'art et la manière" (Florence, Obispo) – 4:05
7. "C'est ma terre" (Florence, Mae, Oricelli) – 3:50
8. "Maman" (Mae, Oricelli) – 3:46
9. "Ma vie est une larme" (Dandrimont, Mae) – 3:17
10. "Va voir ailleurs" (Dandrimont, Mae) – 3:14
11. "Mon père spirituel" (Mae) – 3:19
12. "Spleen" (Mae, Pilot, Rodriguez) – 2:59

Collector edition

+ DVD

== Personnel and credits ==
- Guitar: Jean-Marc Benais, Bruno Dandrimont
- Percussion: Denis Benarrosch and Sydney Thiam
- Drums: Michaël Desir
- Keyboards: Johan Dalgaard & Frederic Gaillardet
- Guitar, harmonica, vocals: Christophe Maé
- Bass: Laurent Vernerey
- Musical direction: Dominique Gau
- Mastering: Rodolphe Plisson
- Programming, engineered and mixed by Volodia
- Design: André Palais
- Photo retouching, booklet: Bernard Benant

== Release history ==
Date	Label	Country	Format	Catalog
19 March 2007	Warner Music	Belgium, France, Switzerland	CD	0825646995226
29 June 2007	Warner Music	Belgium, France, Switzerland	CD + DVD	0825646985968
23 November 2007	WEA	Belgium, France, Switzerland	CD + DVD	0825646971091

== Charts and sales ==
=== Weekly charts ===
Chart (2007/08)	Peak position
Belgian (Wallonia) Albums Chart	1
French Digital Chart	1
French Albums Chart	1
Swiss Albums Chart	18
Chart (2010)	Peak position
Greek Albums Chart	44

=== Year-end charts ===
Chart (2007)	Position
Belgian (Wallonia) Albums Chart	7
French Albums Chart	2
Chart (2008)	Position
Belgian (Wallonia) Albums Chart	3
French Albums Chart	3

=== Certifications ===
Certifications for Mon paradis
Region	Certification	Certified units/sales
Belgium (BRMA)	Platinum	50,000^{*}
France (SNEP)	Diamond	750,000^{*}
Switzerland (IFPI Switzerland)	Platinum	30,000^{^}
^{*} Sales figures based on certification alone.^{^} Shipments figures based on certification alone.
