= Quelque part =

Single by Sheryfa Luna

from the album Sheryfa Luna
- B-side: "Instrumental"
- Released: 27 October 2007 (digital); 4 November 2007 (CD single)
- Recorded: France
- Genre: R&B
- Length: 4:23
- Label: Universal
- Songwriters: Jena Lee; Track Invaders
- Producer: Sulee B. Wax

Sheryfa Luna singles chronology
"Quelque part" (2007)	"Il avait les mots" (2008)

"Quelque part" is a 2007 song recorded by the R&B singer Sheryfa Luna. It was released on 4 November 2007 as the first single from the album Garder cette vie, on which it features as third track (it was available digitally since the previous week). The single achieved a great success in France and Belgium (Wallonia), becoming a top five hit in these countries.

== Background and music video ==
The music was composed by Track Invaders and Jena Lee and the text written by the latter.

The music video was directed by Yvan Grbovic, who also directed various videoclips for Vitaa, Diam's and other artists. It was filmed in the 19th arrondissement of Paris, including Paris Métro Line 11 while Luna is seen in an MP 59 (rubber-tyred stock retired since June 12, 2024). At the end, special guests can be seen, such as Ibtisame, a contestant of Popstars, and members of her favorite dance crew, Wanted Posse.

== Chart performances ==
In France, the single entered the digital chart at No. 21 on 27 October 2007, then jumped to No. 2, but was unable to dislodge Rihanna's "Don't Stop the Music". On the singles chart, the song went straight to No. 1 on 4 November and stayed there for four consecutive weeks (first week : about 24,300 sales; second week : 16,877 sales; third week : 16,064 sales). Then it dropped slowly on the chart, totaling 11 weeks in the top ten, 21 weeks in the top 50 and 35 weeks in the top 100. It is the 9th best-selling singles of 2007 in France.

In Belgium (Wallonia), the single was charted for 19 weeks on the Ultratop 40, from 8 December 2007 to 12 April 2008. It debuted at No. 19, reached the top ten three weeks later and remained in it for ten weeks, with a peak at No. 5 in its fifth and ninth weeks. After that, it didn't stop to drop rather quickly on the chart. Sheryfa Luna's second single, "Il avait les mots", was most successful in this country, topping the chart.

== Track listings ==
CD single

1. "Quelque part" (radio edit) – 4:23
2. "Quelque part" (album version) – 4:26
3. "Quelque part" (instrumental) – 4:26

Digital download

1. "Quelque part" (radio edit) – 3:28
2. "Quelque part" (album version) – 4:26

== Charts ==
Chart (2007/08)	Peak position
Belgian (Wallonia) Singles Chart	5
Eurochart Hot 100	5
French Digital Chart	2
French SNEP Singles Chart	1
Swiss Singles Chart	35

End of year chart (2007)	Position
French Airplay Chart	88
French Singles Chart	9
French TV Airplay Chart	103
End of year chart (2008)	Position
Belgian (Wallonia) Singles Chart	14
Eurochart Hot 100	38
French Singles Chart	53
