= Yael Naim (album) =

Studio album by Yael Naim
- Released: 22 October 2007
- Recorded: 2007
- Genre: Pop
- Length: 51:44
- Languages: English; Hebrew; French
- Labels: Tôt ou Tard (France); Atlantic (US)
- Producers: Yael Naim; David Donatien

Yael Naim chronology
| In a Man's Womb (2001) | Yael Naim (2007) | She Was a Boy (2011) |

Professional ratings
Review scores
| Source | Rating |
|---|---|
| PopMatters | 7/10 |

Yael Naim is the self-titled second studio album by Yael Naim, released on 22 October 2007 worldwide and on 18 March 2008 in North America. It features the single "New Soul", which gained widespread popularity after being featured in Apple's MacBook Air video advertisement. Some editions credit the album to both Naim and co-producer David Donatien, with some also adding Donatien's name to the cover in smaller text below Naim's.

== Release ==
The album was released in Naim's native France in October 2007. It was made available as an iTunes digital download worldwide but only gained widespread popularity in February 2008 when the song "New Soul" was featured in advertisements for the MacBook Air computer. Largely due to the popularity of the advert and the substantial airplay of the song, the album debuted at number 15 in Canada and 55 in the United States when it was released in March 2008.

== Singles ==
- "Toxic" (Britney Spears cover) – No. 35 Spain
- "New Soul" – No. 1 Belgium, No. 2 France, No. 4 Germany, No. 7 United States, Canada and Spain
- "Too Long" – No. 17 Belgium Ultratip

== Commercial performance ==
The self-titled album Yael Naim debuted at number 55 on the Billboard 200 albums chart on the week of April 5, 2008, eventually rising to number 50.

== Track listing ==
All tracks are written by Yael Naim, except where noted.

Yael Naim track listing
| No. | Title | Writer(s) | Length |
|---|---|---|---|
| 1. | "Paris" | | 3:07 |
| 2. | "Too Long" | | 4:42 |
| 3. | "New Soul" | | 3:45 |
| 4. | "Levater" | | 3:24 |
| 5. | "Shelcha" | Yael Naim; Clement Verzi | 4:38 |
| 6. | "Lonely" | Yael Naim; Anne Warin | 4:06 |
| 7. | "Far Far" | | 4:20 |
| 8. | "Yashanti" | | 3:53 |
| 9. | "7 Baboker" | | 3:33 |
| 10. | "Lachlom" | | 4:22 |
| 11. | "Toxic" | Cathy Dennis; Henrik Jonback; Christian Karlsson; Pontus Winnberg | 4:27 |
| 12. | "Pachad" | | 4:27 |
| 13. | "Endless Song of Happiness" | | 3:00 |

== Personnel ==
- Ilan Abou – double bass
- Jean-Philippe Audin – cello
- Noam Burg – acoustic guitar, electric guitar
- Laurent David – bass guitar, electric guitar
- Cathy Dennis – composer, lyricist
- David Donatien – arranger, artistic director, bass, drums, electric guitar, engineer, kalimba, organ, percussion, producer, programming, string concept, synthesizer, udu, ukulele
- Julien Feltin – acoustic guitar, electric guitar
- S. "Husky" Höskulds – mastering, mixing
- Henrik Jonback – composer
- C. Karlsson – composer, lyricist
- Kid with No Eyes – vocals
- Alexandre Kinn – Weissenborn
- Sebastien Llado – trombone
- Yael Naim – vocals, arranger, composer, producer, lyricist, engineer, programming, bass, bells, choir / chorus, drawing, Fender Rhodes, flute, acoustic guitar, electric guitar, melodica, organ, piano, string arrangements, string concept, synthesizer
- Yoed Nir – cello, string concept
- Virna Nova – acoustic guitar
- Fanny Rome – trombone, violin
- Laurent Seroussi – artwork, photography
- Stanislas Steiner – violin
- Xavier Tribolet – drums
- Clement Verzi – composer, lyricist
- Anne Warin – composer, lyricist
- Petter Winnberg – composer

== Charts ==
=== Weekly charts ===
Chart performance for Yael Naim
| Chart (2007–2008) | Peak position |
|---|---|
| Austrian Albums (Ö3 Austria) | 10 |
| Belgian Albums (Ultratop Flanders) | 75 |
| Belgian Albums (Ultratop Wallonia) | 2 |
| Canadian Albums (Billboard) | 15 |
| European Top 100 Albums (Billboard) | 27 |
| French Albums (SNEP) | 6 |
| German Albums (Offizielle Top 100) | 24 |
| Italian Albums (FIMI) | 27 |
| New Zealand Albums (RMNZ) | 17 |
| Swiss Albums (Schweizer Hitparade) | 18 |
| US Billboard 200 | 50 |

=== Year-end charts ===
2007 Year-end chart performance for Yael Naim
| Chart (2007) | Position |
|---|---|
| French Albums (SNEP) | 55 |

2008 Year-end chart performance for Yael Naim
| Chart (2008) | Position |
|---|---|
| Belgian Albums (Ultratop Wallonia) | 10 |
| French Albums (SNEP) | 30 |
| Swiss Albums (Schweizer Hitparade) | 61 |

== Certifications ==
Certifications for Yael Naim
| Region | Certification | Certified units/sales |
|---|---|---|
| Belgium (BRMA) | Gold | 15,000^{*} |
| Switzerland (IFPI Switzerland) | Gold | 15,000^{^} |
^{*} Sales figures based on certification alone.^{^} Shipments figures based on certification alone.
