= Il avait les mots =

Single by Sheryfa Luna

from the album Sheryfa Luna
- Released: 21 January 2008
- Recorded: 2007
- Genre: Pop; R&B
- Length: 3:47
- Label: ULM
- Songwriter(s): Sulee B. Wax
- Producer(s): Dave; Singuila; Track Invaders

Sheryfa Luna singles chronology
"Quelque part" (2007)	"Il avait les mots" (2008)	"D'ici et d'ailleurs" (2008)

"II avait les mots" (He had the words in English) is a pop music song recorded by contemporary R&B singer Sheryfa Luna, on the topic of relationships and infidelity. It was her second single from her debut album entitled Sheryfa Luna. It was released in January 2008 and achieved a great success, particularly in France and Belgium (Wallonia), where it became a number-one hit.

== Background, lyrics and video ==
"Il avait les mots" Primarily is a pop-ballad songs incorporate with R&B and Electro Hop Rhythm sounds, was written by Dave Siluvangi and Singuila and composed by Singuila and Track Invaders. It is the second single from her debut album, Sheryfa Luna. The single was released on 21 January 2008.

According to singer Sheryfa Luna, the song is talk about the "story of a young girl who dates with an older man, and who realized that this man is married and that he has children".

The music video was produced by Núfilms, directed by Ivan Grbovic and shot in Montreal, Quebec, Canada, in November 2007. The video illustrates the song's lyrics. It began to be aired in the middle of December 2007.

== Chart performances ==
As the previous single "Quelque part", "Il avait les mots" went straight to number one on the French Singles Chart, on 26 January 2008, with 15,800 sales in the first week. It was the first time in France that a contestant of TV reality show managed to have two number-one hits with his first two singles. After eight weeks spent on the first position of the French Singles Chart, 86,855 copies of the single were sold. Then "Il avait les mots" almost didn't stop to drop on the chart, and totalled 11 weeks in the top ten, 21 weeks in the top 50 and 34 weeks in the top 100.

The single was also successful in Belgium: it went to #33 on 9 February and climbed every week until it reached #1 from 22 March to 19 April (5 weeks). For the moment, it stayed for 18 weeks in the top ten and 28 weeks on the chart.

The single achieved a minor success in Switzerland, peaking at #29 in its fourth week, on 24 February and stayed on the chart for 11 weeks. To date, it is the highest position of Sheryfa Luna in this country.

== Track listings ==
CD single

1. "Il avait les mots" — 3:47
2. "Il avait les mots" (instrumental) — 3:59

CD maxi

1. "Il avait les mots" — 3:47
2. "Il avait les mots" (instrumental) — 3:59
3. "Il avait les mots" (remix) featuring Léa Castel — 3:47

Digital download

1. "Il avait les mots" — 3:47

== Charts ==
Chart (2008)	Peak position
Belgian (Wallonia) Singles Chart	1
Eurochart Hot 100	4
French SNEP Singles Chart	1
French Digital Chart	2
Swiss Singles Chart	29

End of year chart (2008)	Position
Belgian (Wallonia) Singles Chart	7
Eurochart Hot 100	32
French Airplay Chart	33
French Digital Chart	35
French Singles Chart	3
