= New Soul =

Single by Yael Naïm

from the album Yael Naim
- Released: February 15, 2008
- Recorded: 2007
- Genre: Indie folk
- Length: 3:34 (album version); 3:44 (single version)
- Label: Tôt ou Tard
- Songwriter: Yael Naïm
- Producers: Yael Naïm; David Donatien

Yael Naïm singles chronology
"Toxic" (2007)	"New Soul" (2008)	"Too Long" (2008)

"New Soul" is a song by the French-Israeli singer Yael Naïm, from her self-titled second album. The song gained popularity in the United States following its use by Apple in an advertisement for their MacBook Air laptop. In the song Naïm sings of being a new soul who has come into the world to learn "a bit 'bout how to give and take". However, she finds that things are harder than they seem. The song, also featured in the films The House Bunny and Wild Target, features a prominent "la la la la" section as its hook. It remains Naïm's biggest hit single in the US to date, and her only one to reach the top 40 of the Billboard Hot 100.

"New Soul" was mixed and mastered by S. Husky Höskulds at Groundlift Studios, Reykjavik and Los Angeles.

== Composition ==
The sheet music for "New Soul" published in the key of C major, and is set in time signature of common time with a tempo of 100 beats per minute. Yael Naim's vocal range spans from A_{3} to A_{5}.

== Music video ==
The video shows Naim moving into an empty apartment. She covers the walls in wallpaper depicting a lake surrounded by forest. She then begins unpacking several other things, including furniture, a piano, a goldfish in a bowl and a number of photographs of people, which she hangs on the wall. As she hangs the photographs, the people in the pictures are shown in real life, in the setting depicted in the pictures. Naïm then begins painting on the photographs, and whatever she paints appears with the people in real life. She removes one of the pictures to discover a hole in the wall, revealing the actual forest setting shown in the wallpaper. She pushes on the wall, and it falls away into the lake. The remaining walls fall onto the water leaving the floor of the apartment like a raft floating on the lake, together with her furniture. The people from her pictures reach her by boat. They climb onto the makeshift raft with her, as they all celebrate, dancing and playing instruments, whilst she empties the goldfish bowl into the lake.

In 2008, the video received strong airplay on MTV.

== Chart performance ==
In the issue dated 16 February 2008, "New Soul" debuted on the U.S. Billboard Hot 100 at number 9, giving Naïm her first single ever to enter any US chart. It reached number 7 on the Hot 100 before falling to number 42 the following week. It later rebounded due to being featured on the Apple MacBook Air commercials, but nonetheless the song spent a total of 19 weeks on the chart. It debuted at number 44 on the Canadian Hot 100, and jumped to number 7 on the chart the following week. In her birth country of France, the single hit number 1 on the French Singles Chart. In February 2008, it debuted on the UK Singles Chart at number 42 and reached a peak of number 30 one month later.

== Personnel ==
- Yael Naïm – vocals, guitar, piano, composition, lyrics
- Laurent David – bass, guitar
- David Donatien – drums
- Sebastien Llado – trombone

== Charts ==
=== Weekly charts ===
Chart (2008)	Peak position
Australia (ARIA)	29
Austria (Ö3 Austria Top 40)	2
Belgium (Ultratop 50 Flanders)	7
Belgium (Ultratop 50 Wallonia)	1
Czech Republic Airplay (ČNS IFPI)	2
European Hot 100 Singles (Billboard)	3
Canada Hot 100 (Billboard)	7
France (SNEP)	2
Hungary (Editors' Choice Top 40)	9
Italy (FIMI)	6
Japan (Japan Hot 100)	11
Mexico Anglo (Monitor Latino)	10
Netherlands (Single Top 100)	12
New Zealand (Recorded Music NZ)	21
Switzerland (Schweizer Hitparade)	5
UK Singles (OCC)	30
US Billboard Hot 100	7
US Adult Alternative Airplay (Billboard)	9
US Adult Pop Airplay (Billboard)	16

=== Year-end charts ===
Chart (2008)	Position
Austria (Ö3 Austria Top 40)	15
Belgium (Ultratop Flanders)	36
Belgium (Ultratop Wallonia)	6
Canada (Canadian Hot 100)	77
France (SNEP)	14
Germany (Official German Charts)	33
Japan (Japan Hot 100)	81
Switzerland (Schweizer Hitparade)	19

== Certifications ==
Region	Certification	Certified units/sales
Belgium (BRMA)	Gold	
Italy	—	25,560
United States (RIAA)	Gold	500,000^{^}
^{^} Shipments figures based on certification alone.

== Release history ==
Release dates and formats for "New Soul"
Region	Date	Format	Label(s)	Ref.
United States	May 13, 2008	Mainstream airplay	Atlantic	

== See also ==
- Ultratop 40 number-one hits of 2008
- List of number-one hits of 2008 (France)
