= Michaël Youn =

French actor, singer and TV personality

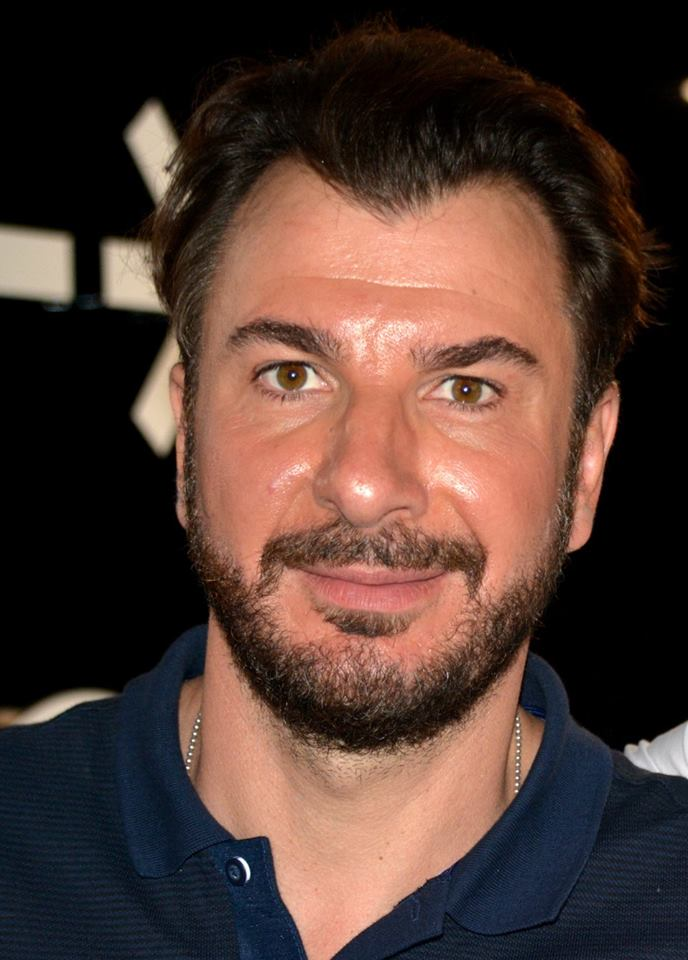
- Youn in 2018
- Born: Michaël Benayoun; Suresnes, Hauts-de-Seine, France
- Occupations: Actor; singer; comedian; television personality
- Years active: 1998–present

Michaël Benayoun (French pronunciation: [mikaɛl benajun]; born 1973), known professionally as Michaël Youn, is a French actor, singer, comedian and television personality.

== Life and career ==
Youn was born Michaël Benayoun in Suresnes, France, to a family of Hungarian, Italian, Moroccan-Jewish, and Algerian-Jewish descent.

After his education as an announcer and theater actor, Youn joined the Paris radio station Skyrock in 1998. There, he made sketches and further entertainment during the morning show.

The popularity and success of Michael Youn, at the most important French private broadcast station brought Youn to the attention of French TV executives. In July 2000, he was hired for the new morning show "Morning Live" shown on M6. With Vincent Desagnat and Benjamin Morgaine, Youn did the entertainment part of the show. Like their sketches and public events (e.g. foam bath in a Paris fountain, and waking random Parisians up shooting the slogan of the show at them), their parodies were particularly successful. In particular, they parodied the music scene of Jean-Michel Jarre, casting-popstars, the Grand Prix and French rappers.

After leaving "Morning Live" in 2002, Youn, Desagnat and Morgaine have focused on their music parodies: The three sailors "Piotr", "Olaff" and "Dvorjak" from the Eastern European "Slowakistan", the Bratisla Boys, appeared on the Western music market with their song "Stach Stach". The act became a big success and was number one on the French charts for ten weeks. On a 2004 list of the all-time best selling CDs in France, "Stach Stach" was listed number 30. The success even spread beyond the French border and reached Switzerland, where it was 2nd on the official charts. On 7 July 2002, the project was stopped by its makers. They claimed that the Bratisla Boys had vanished on the Dead Sea without a trace.

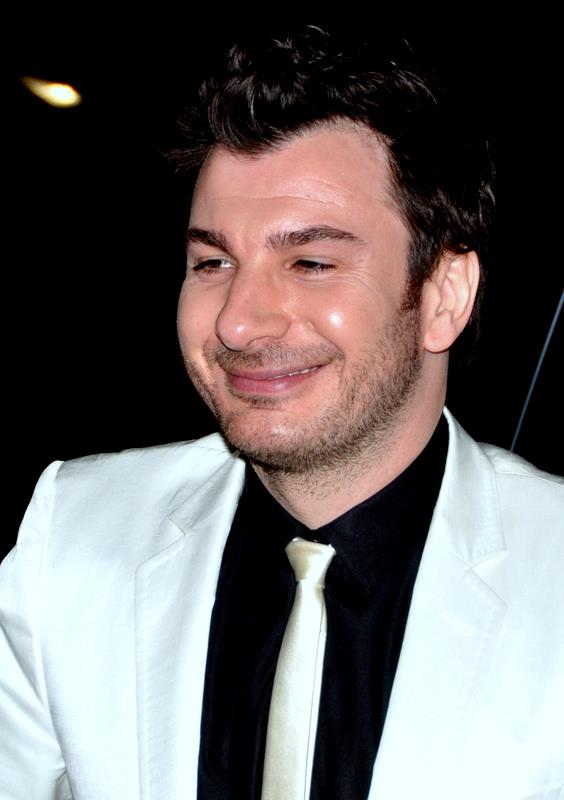
Youn at the NRJ Music Awards 2013

In 2003, the film La Beuze, written by Youn and Desagnat, was released. Youn played the character of Alphonse, the "unknown son" of James Brown, who tries to start his own career – by creating a new (fictional) style called "Frunkp" (a mixture of funk and rap). The song "Le Frunkp" was published as a CD-single and Michaël Youn (under the name of Alphonse Brown) had another hit. This time, he even reached #1 in Swiss charts.

Youn had a comedy-tour, called Pluskapoil in 2003/04 (its sequel followed in 2005) and has acted in films. New music projects followed: Les Conards (The Imbeciles) with Comme des Connards, a cover version of My Sharona by The Knack, as well as a song for the movie Iznogoud (both were in the French Top 20). He had small roles in rather big films, and was part of Les 11 commandements in 2004 (A French film done in the style of MTV's Jackass, together with Desagnat and Morgaine).

In 2005, Youn was Iznogoud in the film version of the comic "Iznogoud" (also known as Isnogud). In 2006, he had the main role in the film comedy Incontrôlable. Those two films were not very successful, critics and viewers finding them only so-so. Both films starred Desagnat and Morgaine, but only in small roles.

In 2010, he directed his first movie "Fatal" in which he also stars.

=== Fatal Bazooka ===
Towards the end of 2006 they picked up a parody from their old Morning-Live times: the hardcore rappers Fatal Bazooka ("Lethal Bazooka"), in which they played two rappers called "Profanation Fonky" and "La Marmotte Infernale" who wore balaclavas. Using a hardcore style of rap, they rapped Fous ta cagoule ("Put on your balaclava"). It reached #1 on the French charts.

The CD-single is "Fous ta cagoule" of 2006. The song parodies multiple French rappers, in particular slammer Grand Corps Malade and Booba. The video clip was made by Nicolas Benamou.

His first single of 2007, "Mauvaise foi nocturne"' with Pascal Obispo parodied Confessions nocturnes by Diam's and Vitaa (mentioned in "Parle à ma main" as well) also went to #1 in France.

Fatal Bazooka released a full LP titled T'as vu ? in the last week of May 2007 selling over 300,000 copies in France and scored another N1 single (Christmas 2007 number one) with "Parle à ma main" ("Talk to my hand") featuring Yelle released at the end of 2007. This time they attacked another phenomenon of French society : the "lolitas" and their antics.

The album was released through Jam Block entertainment/Warner Music France.

== Discography ==
(For discography as part of Fatal Bazooka, refer to their page)

=== Albums ===
Year	Single	Credited to	Peak positions
Year	Single	Credited to	FRA
2002	Anthologigi	Bratisla Boys	14

=== Singles ===
Year	Single	Credited to	Peak positions			Album
Year	Single	Credited to	FRA	BEL (Wa)	SWI	Album
2002	"Stach Stach"	Bratisla Boys	1	3	2	
2002	"Le frunkp"	Alphonse Brown	1	1	1	
2003	"Comme des Conards"	Les Conards	3	3	11	
2005	"Iznogoud"	Michael Youn	12	3	11	–

== Filmography ==
Year	Title	Role	Notes
2000	La malédiction de la mamie	Michaël	Short
2001	Philosophale	Angel	
2003	La Beuze	Alphonse Brown	
2003	Chouchou	Brazilian Transvestite	
2003	The Car Keys	Himself	
2004	Le Carton	Lift Repairman	
2004	Around the World in 80 Days	Art Gallery Director	
2004	Les 11 commandements	Mike	Also writer
2005	L'un reste, l'autre part	Himself	
2005	Iznogoud	Iznogoud	
2006	Incontrôlable	Georges Pal	
2007	Héros	Pierre "Pi" Fôret	Also writer
2007	Tu peux garder un secret ?	Pizza Deliveryman	
2008	Madagascar: Escape to Africa	King Julien	French dub
2009	Lucky Luke	Billy the Kid	
2010	Coursier	Samuel "Sam" Skjqurilngskwicz	
2010	Fatal	Fatal Bazooka	Also writer and director
2011	De l'huile sur le feu	Policeman	
2012	The Chef	Jacky Bonnot	
2012	La Traversée	Martin	
2012	Madagascar 3: Europe's Most Wanted	King Julien	French dub
2013	Vive la France	Feruz	Also writer and director
2014	The Penguins of Madagascar	King Julien	French dub
2016	The Canterville Ghost	Gwilherm	
2017	Carbon	Laurent Melki	
2017	Sahara	Sandfish	Voice
2018	Christ(off)	Brother Christophe	
2018	Brillantissime	Ben	
2019	Chamboultout	Fabrice	
2019	Rendez-vous chez les Malawas	Kévin Queffelec	Also writer
2020	Lucky	Tony	
2020	Divorce Club	Titi	
2020	Connectés	François	
2023	BDE	Bob	Also writer and director
2025	The Gardener	Serge Schuster	

== Television ==
Year	Title	Role	Notes
2000-2002	Morning Live	Host/Various roles	
2001-2002	Caméra café	Romain Pascal/Guillaume/Marc Bocage	3 episodes
2007	Moot-Moot	Harchibald de Montgolfier (voice)	Episode: "Proot Moot"
2007	Off Prime	Himself	Episode: "Coincée par les paparazzis"
2014	L'esprit de famille	Max Perez	TV movie
2014	Taxi Brooklyn	Taxi Client	Uncredited
2016	Mon frère bien-aimé	Mathias Leroy	TV movie
2018	Les bracelets rouges	Gilbert	6 episodes
2018	Deux gouttes d'eau	Sam	TV movie
2017	Scènes de ménages	Sylvain	Episode: "Ca va être leur fête"
2017	American Horror Story	Milo	Episode: "Chapter 9", French dub
2018	Le jour où j'ai brûlé mon coeur	Patrick Demarescau	TV movie Prix média ENFANCE majuscule 2019 [archive] Catégorie Fiction
2021	Une affaire française	Jean-Michel Bezina	6 episodes
2021	Fugueuses	Stephane	6 episodes
2021	M'abandonne pas	Romain	TV movie
2022	Ils s'aiment....enfin presque	Jacques-André	TV movie

== Music videos ==
Year	Title	Artist	Role
2002	"Stach Stach"	Bratisla Boys	Dvorjak
2002	"It's Kyz My Life"	Gad Elmaleh	Dvorjak
2002	"Le frunkp"	Alphonse Brown	
2004	"Comme des connards"	Les Conards	Mike
2005	"Iznogoud"	Michaël Youn	Iznogoud
2006	"Fous ta cagoule"	Fatal Bazooka	
2007	"Mauvaise foi nocturne"	Fatal Bazooka	
2007	"J'aime trop ton boule"	Fatal Bazooka	
2007	"Trankillement"	Fatal Bazooka	
2007	"Le chanteur idéal"	Pascal Obispo	Producer
2007	"Parle à ma main"	Christelle Bazooka	
2008	"C'est une pute"	Fatal Bazooka	
2010	"Ce matin va être une pure soirée"	Fatal Bazooka	
2011	"Chuis Bo"	PZK	Father
2014	"Ce soir sans mon sexe"	Fatal Bazooka	
