= Yael Naim =

Israeli singer (born 1978)

- יעל נעים
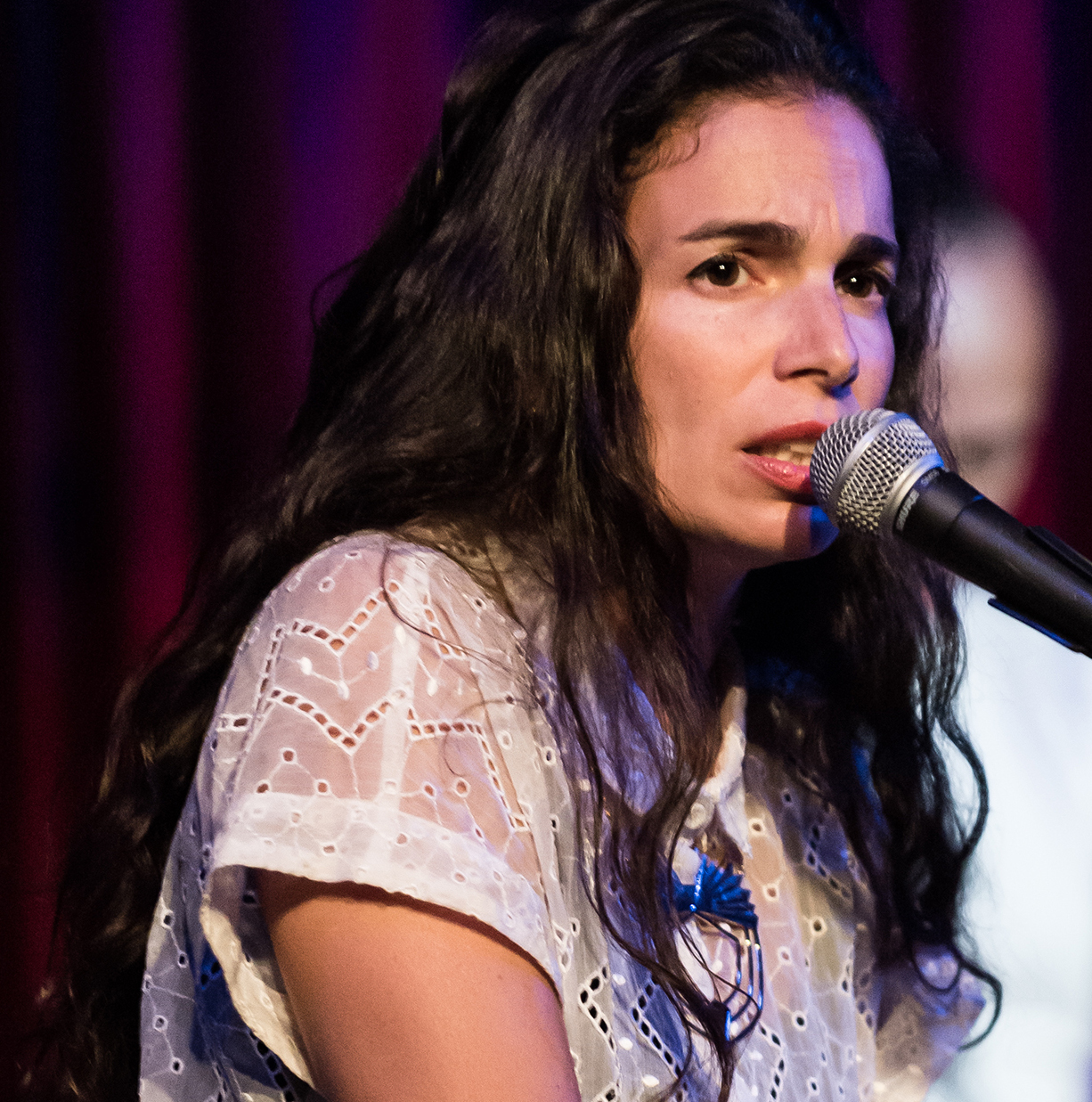
- Naim in 2016
- Born: 6 February 1978 (age 48); Paris, France
- Occupations: Singer; actress
- Years active: 2000–present
- Spouse: David Donatien
- Children: 2
- Musical career
- Origin: Ramat HaSharon, Israel
- Genres: Pop; new wave; indie rock; folk
- Instruments: Vocals; piano; guitar; ukulele; keyboards
- Labels: Warner France; Tôt ou Tard; Atlantic
- Website: www.yaelnaim.fr

Yael Naim (Hebrew: יעל נעים; born 6 February 1978) is a French-born Israeli singer and actress. She rose to fame in 2008 in the US after her hit single "New Soul" was used by Apple in an advertising campaign for its MacBook Air. The song peaked at No. 7 on the Billboard Hot 100. In 2013, the French government made her a knight of the Ordre des Arts et des Lettres.

== Life and career ==
Yael Naim was born in Paris, France to Maghrebi Jewish immigrants from Tunisia. At the age of four, she moved with her family to Ramat HaSharon, Israel, where she spent the rest of her childhood. She served in the Israel Defense Forces as a soloist in the Israeli Air Force Orchestra.

She began her singing career with a part in the musical Les Dix Commandements and her first solo album, In a Man's Womb (recorded in Los Angeles with Kamil Rustam), was released in 2001. She also sang the song "You Disappear" by Bruno Coulais for the film Harrison's Flowers. In her early work, she was credited simply as Yael. She also performed a duet with Din Din Aviv titled "Mashmauyot". Her version of the Britney Spears song "Toxic" also garnered significant attention.

Naim joined with percussionist David Donatien and, over a period of two years, they arranged and recorded thirteen of Naim's songs in a studio in her apartment in Paris. These were released as her second album, Yael Naim, on 22 October 2007, on the Tôt ou tard label. The songs are in French, English, and Hebrew and received critical acclaim. The album entered the French album chart at No. 11 the week after its release. Her style has been described as having a touch of folk and a touch of jazz, with mysterious and evocative words sung with a delicate and intentionally husky voice.

In January 2008, Apple featured her song "New Soul" in its debut commercial for the MacBook Air laptop. Steve Jobs himself picked the song for the launch of the laptop line. Owing to high U.S. digital sales, the song debuted on the Billboard Hot 100 for the chart week of 16 February 2008, at No. 9, becoming Naim's first U.S. top ten single, and making her the first Israeli solo artist to ever have a top ten hit in the United States. "New Soul" moved up to No. 7 the following week. The song was also featured on the soundtrack of the movies The House Bunny and Wild Target. Her third album was released in November 2010. The first single from this new record was "Go to the River".

In 2016, she won her second Female Artist of the Year award at Victoires de la Musique, the French equivalent of the Grammys. She previously won the award in 2011.

== Personal life ==
She is married to David Donatien, a Martiniquais musician, with whom she has two children.

== Discography ==
=== Studio albums ===
Year	Album	Peak positions								
Year	Album	AUT	BEL	CAN	FRA	GER	ITA	NZL	SWI	US
2001	In a Man's Womb	–	–	–	–	–	–	–	–	–
2007	Yael Naim (later credited as with David Donatien)	10	2	15	6	24	27	17	18	50
2010	She Was a Boy (with David Donatien)	–	27	–	14	–	–	–	63	–
2015	Older	–	22	–	12	–	–	–	–	–
2020	Nightsongs	–	–	–	–	–	–	–	–	–

=== Singles ===
Year	Album	Peak positions												Album
Year	Album	AUS	AUT	BEL	CAN	FRA	GER	ITA	NLD	NZL	SWI	UK	US	Album
2008	"New Soul"	29	2	1	7	2	4	6	12	21	5	30	7	Yael Naim

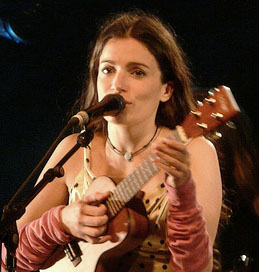
Naim performing in 2008

- 2001 – "You Disappear"
- 2001 – "Do I Do"
- 2001 – "Avril"
- 2007 – "Toxic" (SPAIN Peak #35)
- 2008 – "Too Long"
- 2009 – "Far Far"
- 2010 – "Go to the River"
- 2010 – "The Only One"
- 2011 – "Come Home"
- 2015 – "Dream in My Head" (FRANCE Peak: #77)
- 2015 – "Coward" (FRANCE Peak: #123)

== Awards and nominations ==
Year	Award	Category	Result
2008	Victoires de la Musique	Album of the Year (World Music Category)	Won
2008	NRJ Music Awards	Francophone Revelation of the Year	Nominated
2008	Prix Constantin	Album of the Year	Nominated
2009	Victoires de la Musique	Best Female Singer of the Year	Nominated
2011	Victoires de la Musique	Best Female Singer of the Year	Won

== Television ==
Naim's voice was used in a Season 21 episode of The Simpsons, entitled "The Greatest Story Ever D'ohed". She voiced Dorit, the niece of an Israeli tour guide named Jakob (voiced by Sacha Baron Cohen).

Her single "Come Home" was in an episode of Season 7 of Grey's Anatomy and in episode 6 of the ABC Family series Switched at Birth. Also, her cover of Irene Cara's "Flashdance (What a Feeling)" was used in the promotion video of The Voice UK in 2014.

== Philanthropy ==
On 27 November 2015, she participated together with Nolwenn Leroy and Camélia Jordana at the national memorial day for the victims of the November 2015 Paris attacks singing the song "Quand on n'a que l'amour" from Jacques Brel.

Preceded by Canta by Agnès Jaoui; 2007	Victoires de la Musique; World music album of the year Yael Naim by Yael Naim; 2008	Succeeded by Tchamantché by Rokia Traoré
