= Christophe Maé =

French pop singer (born 1975)

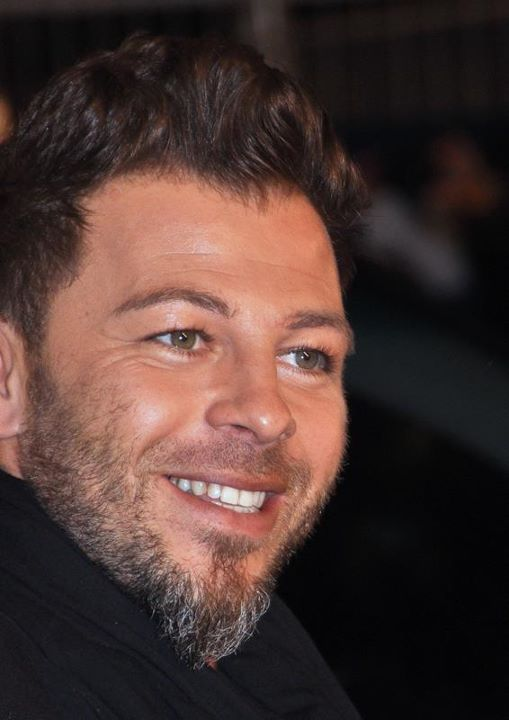
- Maé at the NRJ Music Awards 2012

Background information
- Born: Christophe Martichon; 16 October 1975 (age 50)
- Origin: Carpentras, Vaucluse, France
- Genres: Pop, reggae, soul, jazz, blues, funk, rhythm'n blues, country.
- Instruments: Guitar, violin, harmonica, drums
- Years active: 2005–present
- Label: Warner Bros.
- Website: christophae-mae.fr

Christophe Martichon (French pronunciation: [kʁistɔf maʁtiʃɔ̃]; born 16 October 1975), better known by his stage name Christophe Maé (pronounced [kʁistɔf mae]), is a French pop singer.

== Career ==
Maé learned to play the violin at age five, and later began playing the guitar and harmonica at age 16 after he was immobilised from chronic polyarthritis. He has stated that this was the time when he discovered Stevie Wonder's music which inspired him to take up playing the harmonica. He also discovered Bob Marley's music to whom, years later, he dedicates a song: "Mon père spirituel". It is at the same period that he started playing the guitar. In 2005 he rose to fame by playing the role of Monsieur, brother of King Louis XIV in the musical "Le Roi Soleil", for which he won the NRJ Music Award for revelation of the year 2006.

=== Releases ===
Maé's first album was entitled Sa Danse Donne, and released in 2002–2003. This album is not considered his first studio album. He released his first studio album, Mon paradis (My Paradise) on 19 March 2007, with the singles "On s'attache", "Parce qu'on sait jamais" and "Ça fait mal". His fourth single is "Belle Demoiselle". Mon Paradis was France's second best-selling album of 2007 after Life in Cartoon Motion by Mika, selling more than 1 600 000 albums to date.

In 2010, Maé's second studio album, On trace la route, was released. It has sold more than 600,000 units to date.

In 2013, Maé's third studio album "Je veux du bonheur ", was released. It ranked number one of the top French album during its first week of release with 103,680 copies to date. The album was sold more than 500,000 units to date in July 2014.

In 2016, Maé's fourth studio album "L'attrape-rêves ", was released. It ranked number one of the top French album for 5 weeks. Until the end of 2016, it has sold 300,000 units to date.

== Musical style ==
Maé's music is largely acoustic. He has cited Bob Marley, Ben Harper, Tracy Chapman, and Jack Johnson as well as French singer-songwriters Francis Cabrel and Gérald De Palmas as musical influences. As a counter-tenor his voice has a range from A2 to F6. He allegedly began to learn harmonica as a tribute to Stevie Wonder, who is commonly cited as his biggest influence musically.

== Personal life ==
Christophe Maé has two sons, Jules (born March 2008) and Marcel (born August 2013), with his then-longtime girlfriend Nadège Sarron. Sarron operates a dance school which she founded in Aix-en-Provence, where she lives with her sons. Maé works half the week in Paris, and reunited with his family the rest of the time in the South. He finally proposed to Nadège in 2016 through his song "Ballerine", and the couple married in Porto-Vecchio on 29 June 2017.

== Philanthropy ==
Maé has been a member of the Les Enfoirés charity ensemble since 2008.

== Discography ==
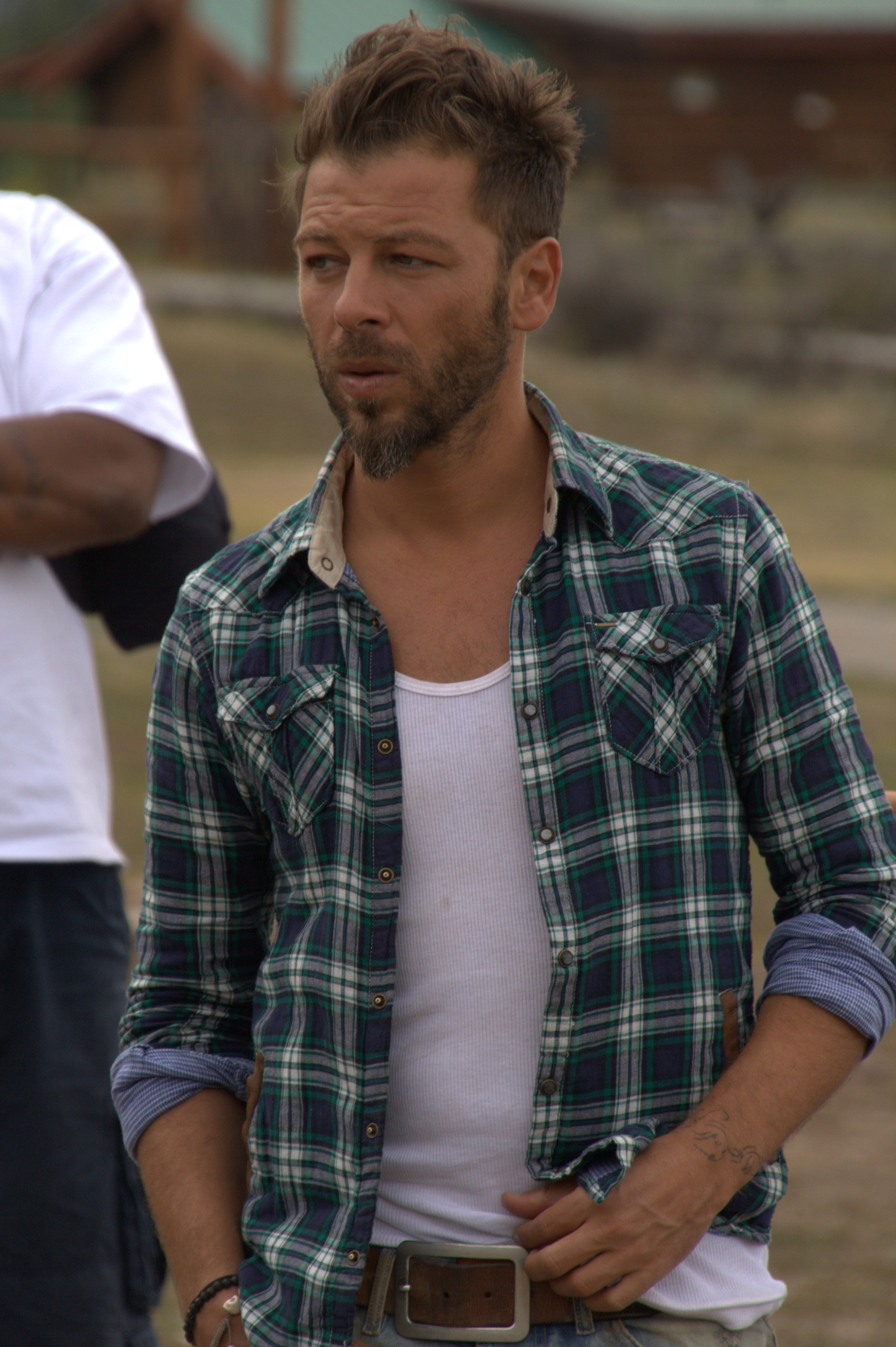
Christophe Maé (2011)

=== Studio albums ===
Year	Information	Charts						Certification
Year	Information	FR	FR (DL)	BEL (Fl)	BEL (Wa)	CAN	SWI	Certification
2008	Mon paradis	1	1	-	1	-	18	France: Diamond
2008	Comme à la maison (Acoustic album)	1	8	-	1	-	13	France: 2× Platinum
2010	On trace la route	1	1	-	1	-	3	France: Diamond
2013	Je veux du bonheur	1	-	32	1	-	4	
2016	L'attrape-rêves	1	-	49	1	9	2	France: 2× Platinum
2019	La vie d'artiste	2	-	-	2	-	6	
2023	C'est drôle la vie	3	-	-	4	-	11	
2026	Fete Foraine	3	-	-	-	-	-	

=== Live album ===
Year	Information	Charts			
Year	Information	FR	FR (DL)	BEL (Fl)	BEL (Wa)
2009	Comme à la maison (Live) (2-CD set with Mon paradis)	181	-	-	-
2011	On trace la route – Le live	1	6	99	1

=== Singles ===
Year	Title	Chart positions					Album
Year	Title	FR	FR (DL)	SWI	BEL (Fl)	BEL (Wa)	Album
2007	"On s'attache"	1	2	27	-	4	Mon paradis
2007	"Parce qu'on ne sait jamais"	6	12	52	-	10	Mon paradis
2007	"Ça fait mal"	138	3	85	-	16	Mon paradis
2008	"Belle Demoiselle"	13	13	74	-	10	Mon paradis
2008	"C'est ma terre"	-	11	91	-	18	Comme à la maison
2008	"Mon p'tit gars"	2	18	-	-	33	Comme à la maison
2009	"Je n'attendais que vous" (Maé, Lara, Maurane, Bruel, La Chorale des Voisins du Dessus)	-	-	-	-	38	
2009	"Dingue, dingue, dingue"	1	3	30	-	4	On trace la route
2010	"J'ai laissé"	-	2	-	-	16	On trace la route
2010	"Je me lâche"	-	16	47	-	12	On trace la route
2010	"Pourquoi c'est beau"	-	33	-	-	-	On trace la route
2011	"La rumeur"	53	-	-	-	4 (Ultratip)	On trace la route
2011	"Un peu de blues"	29	-	-	-	24	
2013	"Tombé sous le charme"	11	-	38	82 (Ultratip)	7	Je veux du bonheur
2013	"Je veux du bonheur"	90	-	-	-	4 (Ultratip)	Je veux du bonheur
2013	"La poupée"	40	-	-	-	2 (Ultratip)	Je veux du bonheur
2013	"Ne t'en fais pas"	200	-	-	-	-	Je veux du bonheur
2014	"Ma douleur, ma peine"	144	-	-	-	-	Je veux du bonheur
2016	"Il est oú le bonheur"	4	-	70	-	14	L'attrape-rêves
2016	"La vallée des larmes"	199	-	-	-	-	L'attrape-rêves
2016	"La Parisienne"	111	-	-	-	30	L'attrape-rêves
2017	"Marcel"	95	-	-	-	-	L'attrape-rêves
2019	"Les gens"	160	-	-	-	11	La vie d'artiste
2021	"Y'a du soleil"	-	-	-	-	23	
2022	"Pays des merveilles" (with Ceuzany)	-	-	-	-	20	
2026	"La lune"	-	-	-	-	16	

== Awards ==
- NRJ Music Award
  - 2007: French revelation of the year
  - 2008: French male artist of the year
  - 2008: French song of the year for "On s'attache"
  - 2009: French male artist of the year
  - 2009: French song of the year for "Belle demoiselle"
  - 2013: NRJ Award of Honor
  - 2016: Video of the year for "Il est où le bonheur"
- Victoires de la musique
  - 2008: Public revelation of the year
- World Music Awards
  - 2008: French artist of the year
- Others
  - 2008: Winner of song of the year on TF1
  - 2014: Winner of song of the year on TF1

Preceded by Miss Dominique	Victoires de la Musique; Group or artist popular révélation of the year 2008	Succeeded by Sefyu
