= Sheryfa Luna =

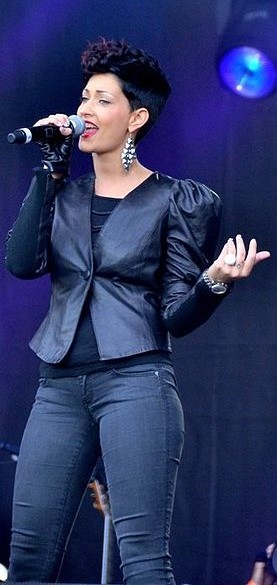
- Sheryfa Luna performing in Paris on Bastille Day 2011

Background information
- Born: Chérifa Babouche; 25 January 1989 (age 37); Évreux, Eure, France
- Origin: French; Algerian
- Genres: R&B; pop; hip hop
- Occupations: Singer; Dancer; Musician; Actress; Television presenter
- Years active: 2007–present
- Label: Universal
- Website: www.sheryfa-luna.com

Sheryfa Luna (born Chérifa Babouche; 25 January 1989) is a French R&B singer born to an Algerian father from Kabylie and a French mother.

She won the fourth series of the French edition of popular Popstars in October 2007. Her self-titled debut album peaked at No. 3 in France and was certified Gold there.

She has released three singles: "Quelque part" (Somewhere) and "Il avait les mots" (He Had the Words), which both went to No. 1 in France, and "D'ici et D'Ailleurs" (From Here and Elsewhere) which was released in March 2008.

Luna gave birth to a son, Vénus Junior, on 14 February 2008.

== Discography ==
=== Album ===
Year	Album	Charts					Certification / French Sales
Year	Album	FR	FR DL	BEL (Wa)	SUI	EUR	Certification / French Sales
2007	Sheryfa Luna	3	6	9	48	28	Double Platinum / 400,000
2008	Vénus	15	7	29	—	—	Platinum / 200,000
2010	Si tu me vois	8	8	—	—	—	60,000
2012	Petite Fée De Soie	148	—	125	—	—	5,000

=== Singles ===
==== As lead artist ====
Year	Single	Charts					Certification / French Sales	Album
Year	Single	FR	FR DL	BEL (Wa)	SUI	EUR	Certification / French Sales	Album
2007	Quelque part	1	2	5	35	5	Silver / 156,000	Sheryfa Luna
2008	Il avait les mots	1	2	1	29	4	Diamond / 6,000,000	Sheryfa Luna
2008	D'ici et d'ailleurs	13	—	23	—	43	17,800	Sheryfa Luna
2008	Comme avant (duet with Mathieu Edward)	3	6	6	67	—	65,000	Entre toi et moi
2008	Si tu n'étais plus là	3	4	36	—	—		Vénus
2009	Ce qu'ils aiment	6	—	—	—	—		Vénus
2009	Je Reviendrai	10	—	—	—	—		Vénus
2010	Tu me manques	—	50	—	—			Si tu me vois
2010	Yemma	—	—	—	—			Si tu me vois
2011	Viens avec moi	—	—	—	—			
2012	M'envoler	—	—	—	—			Petite Fée De Soie
2012	Le temps court	—	—	—	—			Petite Fée De Soie
2013	Sensualité (with Axel Tony)	—	—	—	—			

==== As featured artist ====
Year	Single	Charts		Album
Year	Single	FR	FR DL	Album
2009	Say (À l'infini) (OneRepublic feat. Sheryfa Luna)	—	—	Dreaming Out Loud
2011	All Alone (Est-ce qu'un jour) (Quentin Mosimann featuring Sheryfa Luna)	—	36	
