= Mauvaise foi nocturne =

Single by Fatal Bazooka featuring Vitoo

from the album T'As Vu ?
- B-side: "Fous ta cagoule"
- Released: March 2007
- Recorded: France, 2006
- Genre: Rap, parody, R&B
- Length: 3:53
- Label: Warner Music, Up Music
- Songwriter(s): Nicolas Brisson, Diam's, DJ Maître, Elio, Dominique Gauriaud, William Geslin, Jurij Prette, Tefa, Vitaa, Michaël Youn
- Producer(s): Dominique Gauriaud, William Geslin, Jurij Prette, Michaël Youn

Fatal Bazooka singles chronology
"Fous ta cagoule" (2006)	"Mauvaise foi nocturne" (2007)	"J'aime trop ton boule (Shake ton booty)" (2007)

Music video
- "Mauvaise foi nocturne" on YouTube

"Mauvaise foi nocturne (la réponse)" (French for "Nocturnal dishonesty (the response)") is a 2006 song recorded by French act Fatal Bazooka, led by actor, singer and comedian Michael Youn. Pascal Obispo participated also in the vocals under the name of Vitoo. The song is the eleventh track on the album T'As Vu ?, and was released as second single in the first days of March 2007. It was as successful as "Fous ta cagoule" in terms of chart positions, becoming a number-one hit in France and Belgium (Wallonia).

== Song information ==
The song is a parody of Diam's' song "Confessions nocturnes", recorded with Vitaa as featuring, and included on the album Dans ma bulle. Michaël Youn portrayed Diam's, while Pascal Obispo plays the role of Vitaa. In Fatal Bazooka's music video, there are also many references to the original one by Diam's.

The video was nominated at the 2008 Victoires de la musique in the category "Best music video of the year", but it didn't win.

In France, the single went straight to number six on 3 March 2007, two days after its release. Then it climbed to number-one, where it stayed for five weeks (it was Youn's fourth number-one single in France). Thereafter, it dropped slowly but regularly on the chart, totaling 12 weeks in the top ten, 19 weeks in the top 50 and 31 weeks on the chart (top 100).

In Belgium (Wallonia), "Mauvaise foi nocturne" was charted for 26 weeks in the top 40. It entered the chart at number 29 on 3 March, climbed quickly and eventually reached number-one from its fifth to its ninth week. It remained in the top five for another six weeks, then dropped.

The single was less successful in Switzerland, peaking at number 15 on 1 April 2007 and staying in the top 100 for 15 weeks.

== Track listings ==
- CD single
1. "Mauvaise foi nocturne (la réponse)" — 6:07
2. "Fous ta cagoule" (live in Chambéry 07) by Fatal Bazooka — 4:24
- CD maxi
1. "Mauvaise foi nocturne (la réponse)" (full version) — 3:53
2. "Fous ta cagoule" (live in Chambéry 07) by Fatal Bazooka — 3:46
3. "Mauvaise foi nocturne (la réponse)" (music video)
- Digital download
1. "Mauvaise foi nocturne (la réponse)" — 3:53

== Charts ==
=== Weekly charts ===
Chart (2007–2008)	Peak position
Belgian (Wallonia) Singles Chart	1
Eurochart Hot 100	5
French Digital Chart	1
French SNEP Singles Chart	1
Swiss Singles Chart	15

=== Year-end charts ===
Chart (2007)	Position
Belgian (Wallonia) Singles Chart	6
French Digital Chart	41
French Singles Chart	6

== Certifications ==
Region	Certification	Certified units/sales
Belgium (BRMA)	Gold	25,000^{*}
France (SNEP)	Gold	200,000^{*}
^{*} Sales figures based on certification alone.
