= Fatal Bazooka =

French comedy rap character by Michaël Youn

- Origin: France
- Genres: Comedy hip hop, R&B
- Years active: 2006–present
- Members: Michaël Youn; Vincent Desagnat; Benjamin Morgaine

Fatal Bazooka (French pronunciation: [fatal bazuka]) is a French comedy rap character by Michaël Youn, and a former band including himself, Vincent Desagnat and Benjamin Morgaine. The act originated in a 2002 TV show which its members hosted at the time. Fatal Bazooka is also the name of the fictitious singer of the group, played by Youn himself.

== Hit singles ==
=== "Fous ta cagoule" ===
The first single by Fatal Bazooka, "Fous ta cagoule" ("put your balaclava on"), transposed the urban style to the snow-covered mountains of Savoy. The clip was produced by Nicolas Benamou. The single topped the charts in France in January 2006.

=== "Mauvaise foi nocturne" ===
This single, released in 2007, parodies the song "Confessions nocturnes" by Diam's and Vitaa. Michaël Youn, alias "Fatal", parodies Diam's character, while Pascal Obispo, alias "Vitoo", takes on Vitaa. The music is identical to the original song, but the words are modified. The associated video clip was also a scene-by-scene spoof.

There exist at least four versions of this song, one for each different part (in particular the scene in the car, after having left the apartment of the young lady).

=== "J'aime trop ton boule" ===
Fatal Bazooka's third single parodies ragga singers such as Lord Kossity, and of course Sean Paul. The beginning of the clip shows the arrival of Fatal in a nightclub. Initially it seems that he is trying to lure a girl, but then the girl is literally isolated, and the interest of Fatal goes finally on a man (played by Magloire). The remainder of the clip is a homoerotic anthem filled with humor about the male body.

In another sequence of the clip, the men rub themselves and each other and use power-tools in the same suggestive manner as the girls in Benny Benassi's "Satisfaction". Yet another sequence parodies Eric Prydz's "Call on Me", which features a sexy gym class of all girls – but in this parody all the participants are men.

=== "Trankillement" ===
"Trankillement" makes fun of the stereotyped bravado of American rappers and the associated party lifestyle. The clip, produced by Kourtrajmé, features nods to other artists and videos, including Moby's "Beautiful" .

The ring-tone used at the beginning of the Trankillement video is also used by famous socialites French Fever and Brian Schulman as their ring-tones (as observed when Fatal Bazooka received a phone call during the filming of an episode of Regis Philbin in which he appeared).

=== "Parle à ma main" ===
"Parle à ma main" or "PAMM" is the fifth single from Fatal Bazooka's album T'As Vu ?. The song is sung by Michaël Youn and Yelle. Michaël Youn appears in the video in drag as his usual character Fatal's sister, Christelle Bazooka.

=== "Ce matin va être une pure soirée" ===
"Ce matin va être une pure soirée" is a single featuring Big Ali, PZK, Dogg SoSo, and Chris Prolls released in June 2010 to promote the film Fatal, starring Fatal Bazooka. The song is a parody of Three 6 Mafia feat. Tiësto's "Feel It".

== Discography ==
=== Albums ===
| Year | Single | Peak positions | | | Album |
| Year | Single | FRA | BEL (Wa) | SWI | Album |
|---|---|---|---|---|---|
| 2007 | T'As Vu ? | 4 | 3 | 27 | |

=== Singles ===
| Year | Single | Peak positions | | | Album |
| Year | Single | FRA | BEL (Wa) | SWI | Album |
|---|---|---|---|---|---|
| 2006 | "Fous ta cagoule" | 1 | 1 | 8 | |
| 2007 | "Mauvaise foi nocturne (La réponse)" (feat. Vitoo) | 1 | 1 | 5 | |
| 2007 | "J'aime trop ton boule (Shake ton booty)" | – | 23 | 51 | |
| 2007 | "Trankillement" | – | – | 99 | |
| 2007 | "Parle à ma main" (feat. Yelle) | 1 | 1 | 31 | |
| 2008 | "C'est une pute" | – | – | – | |
| 2010 | "Ce matin va être une pure soirée" (with Big Ali, PZK, Dogg SoSo & Dj Chris Prolls) | – | 20 | 52 | |
| 2010 | "Tuvaferkwa" | – | – | – | |
| 2014 | "Ce soir sans mon sexe" | 84 | – | – | |

=== Nominations ===
- 2008: NRJ Music Awards – French Group/Duet
- 2008: NRJ Music Awards – Clip of the year with "Parle à ma main"
- 2008: Victoires de la musique- Album of Urban Musics with T'as vu
- 2008: Victoires de la musique- Video clip of the year with Mauvaise foi nocturne

=== Awards ===
- 2008: NRJ Music Awards for the clip of the year with "Parle à ma main"
