= Amir Haddad discography =

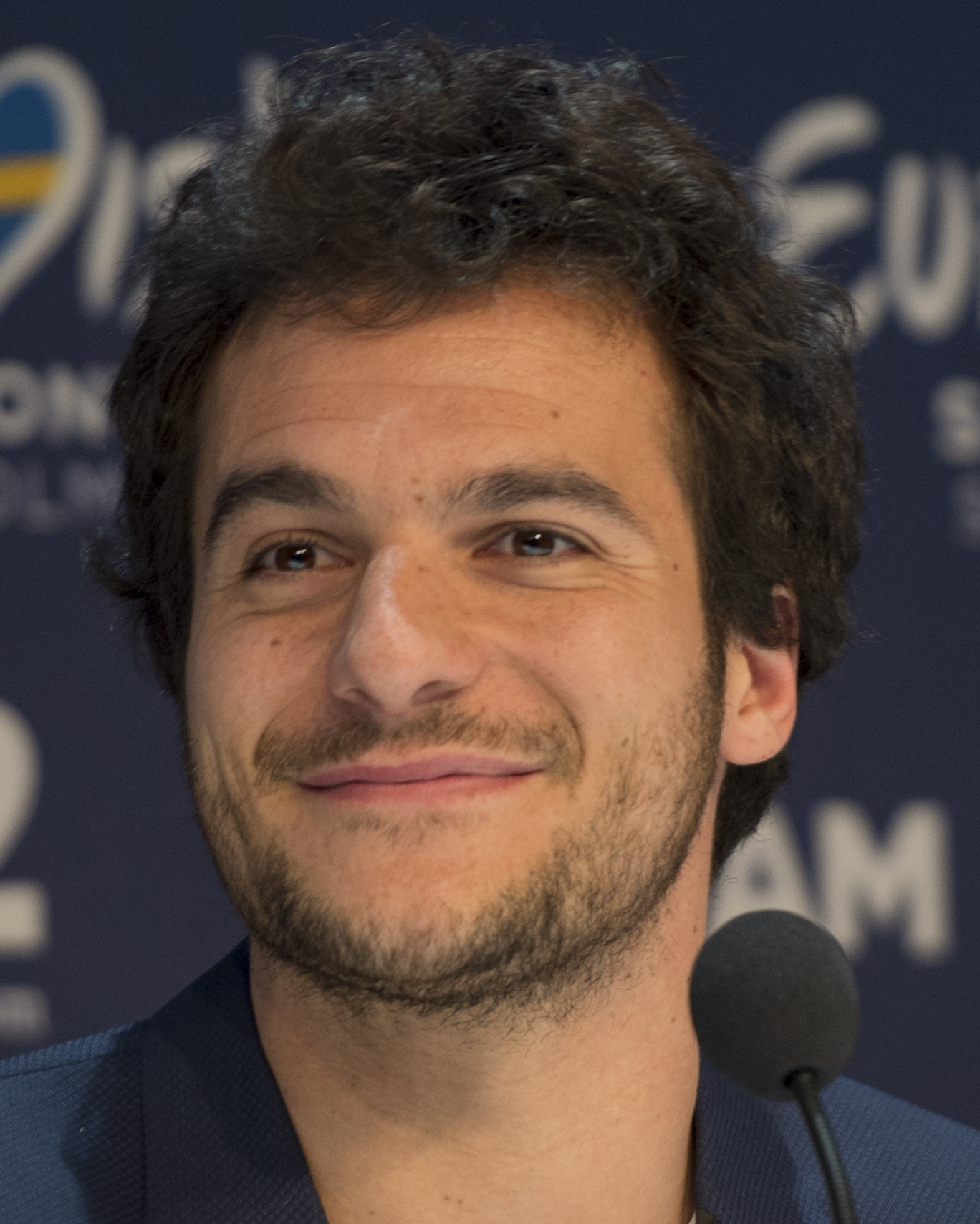
- Haddad in 2016.
- Studio albums: 5
- Singles: 13
- Music videos: 14

The discography of Amir Haddad, a French-Israeli singer-songwriter. His debut studio album, Vayehi, was released in 2011. Au cœur de moi, Haddad's second studio album, was released in April 2016, peaking at number six on the French Albums Chart. The album includes the singles "Oasis", "J'ai cherché", "On dirait" and "Au cœur de moi". In 2016 he was selected by France 2 to represent France at the Eurovision Song Contest 2016 in Stockholm, Sweden. His song, "J'ai cherché" was chosen internally by France 2 by a committee headed by entertainment director Nathalie André and the newly appointed French Head of Delegation for the Eurovision Song Contest Edoardo Grassi after having received 280 submissions. The entry was formally presented to the public on 12 March 2016 during the France 2 programme The DiCaire Show, hosted by Véronic DiCaire. The song finished 6th overall in the grand final with 257 points, France's best placing since 2002 and the country's highest-scoring entry in their contest history. Addictions, Haddad's third studio album, was released in October 2017, peaking at number three on the French Albums Chart. The album includes the singles "No Vacancy", "États d'Amour" and "Les rues de ma peine". The album was re-released in November 2018 and includes the singles "Longtemps" and "5 minutes avec toi". Ressources, Haddad's fourth studio album, was released in October 2020, peaking at number five on the French Albums Chart. The album includes the singles "La fête", "On verra bien" and "Carrousel".

== Albums ==
Title	Details	Peak chart positions				Units	Certifications
Title	Details	FRA	BEL (Fl)	BEL (Wa)	SWI	Units	Certifications
Vayehi	Released: 2011; Label: N/A; Format: Digital download, CD	—	—	—	—		
Au cœur de moi	Released: 29 April 2016; Label: Warner Music Group; Format: Digital download, CD	6	136	14	36	FRA: 250,000	SNEP: 3× Platinum; BEA: Gold; IFPI SWI: Gold
Addictions	Released: 27 October 2017; Label: Warner Music Group; Format: Digital download, CD	4	—	8	17	FRA: 300,000	SNEP: 3× Platinum; BEA: Gold
Ressources	Released: 16 October 2020; Label: Warner Music Group; Format: Digital download, CD, vinyl	5	—	8	24		
C Amir	Released: 13 September 2024; Label: Warner Music Group; Format: Digital download, CD, vinyl	5	—	7	—		
"—" denotes an album that did not chart or was not released.

== Singles ==
=== As lead artist ===
Title	Year	Peak chart positions								Certifications	Album
Title	Year	FRA	AUT	BEL (Fl)	BEL (Wa)	GER	SPA	SWE	SWI	Certifications	Album
"Oasis"	2015	101	—	—	—	—	—	—	—		Au cœur de moi
"J'ai cherché"	2016	2	58	55	4	80	33	45	59	SNEP: Diamond	Au cœur de moi
"On dirait"	2016	15	—	—	14	—	—	—	—	SNEP: Platinum	Au cœur de moi
"Au cœur de moi"	2017	111	—	—	53	—	—	—	—		Au cœur de moi
"États d'Amour"	2017	92	—	—	64	—	—	—	—	SNEP: Gold	Addictions
"Les rues de ma peine"	2018	— (Note: "Les rues de ma peine" did not enter the French Singles Chart (downloads + streaming), but peaked at number 50 on Singles Sales Chart.)	—	—	9	—	—	—	—		Addictions
"Longtemps"	2018	46	—	—	7	—	—	—	—	SNEP: Gold	Addictions
"5 minutes avec toi"	2019	— (Note: "5 minutes avec toi" did not enter the French Singles Chart but peaked at number 108 on Singles Sales Chart.)	—	—	51	—	—	—	—		Addictions
"La fête"	2020	149	—	—	9	—	—	—	—		Ressources
"On verra bien"	2020	—	—	—	29	—	—	—	—		Ressources
"Carrousel" (featuring Indila)	2021	191	—	—	—	—	—	—	—		Ressources
"Rétine"	2021	57	—	—	11	—	—	—	—		Ressources
"Ce soir"	2022	111	—	—	25	—	—	—	—		Ressources
"Il y a" (with Jason Derulo)	2023	195	—	—	—	—	—	—	—		Non-album single
"Complémentaires"	2024	90	—	—	41	—	—	—	—		C Amir
"Nous"	2025	—	—	—	41	—	—	—	—		Non-album single
"—" denotes a single that did not chart or was not released.

=== As featured artist ===
Title	Year	Album
"No Vacancy" (OneRepublic featuring Amir)	2017	Addictions

=== Promotional singles ===
Title	Year	Peak chart positions	Album
Title	Year	FRA	Album
"Just the Way You Are"	2014	—	The Voice: la plus belle voix
"Comme un fils"	2014	—	The Voice: la plus belle voix
"All of Me"	2014	122	The Voice: la plus belle voix
"Ma vie, ma ville, mon monde"	2016	—	Au cœur de moi
"Toi"	2020	—	Ressources
"Ma lumière"	2020	—	Ressources
"—" denotes a single that did not chart or was not released.

== Other appearances ==
Title	Year	Other Artists	Album
"Yalla"	2017	Kids United	Forever United

== Music videos ==
Title	Year	Ref.
"Candle in the Wind"	2014	
"Oasis"	2015	
"J'ai cherché"	2016	
"On dirait"	2016	
"Au cœur de moi"	2017	
"États d'Amour"	2017	
"Les rues de ma peine"	2018	
"Longtemps"	2018	
"5 minutes avec toi"	2019	
"La fête"	2020	
"Toi"	2020	
"Ma lumière"	2020	
"On verra bien"	2020	
"Carrousel"	2021	
