= France in the Eurovision Song Contest 2016 =

- Eurovision Song Contest 2016
- Participating broadcaster: France Télévisions
- Country: France
- Selection process: Internal selection
- Announcement date: 29 February 2016

Competing entry
- Song: "J'ai cherché"
- Artist: Amir
- Songwriters: Amir Haddad; Nazim Khaled; Johan Errami

Placement
- Final result: 6th, 257 points

Participation chronology

France was represented at the Eurovision Song Contest 2016 with the song "J'ai cherché" written by Amir, Nazim Khaled and Johan Errami, and performed by Amir. The French broadcaster France Télévisions in collaboration with the television channel France 2 internally selected the French entry for the 2016 contest in Stockholm, Sweden. "J'ai cherché" was officially announced by France 2 as the French entry on 29 February 2016 and later the song was presented to the public as the contest entry during a live performance by Amir on 12 March 2016 during the France 2 programme The DiCaire Show.

As a member of the "Big Five", France automatically qualified to compete in the final of the Eurovision Song Contest. Performing in position 11, France placed sixth out of the 26 participating countries with 257 points.

== Background ==
Prior to the 2016 Contest, France had participated in the Eurovision Song Contest fifty-eight times since its debut as one of seven countries to take part in 1956. France first won the contest in 1958 with "Dors, mon amour" performed by André Claveau. In the 1960s, they won three times, with "Tom Pillibi" performed by Jacqueline Boyer in 1960, "Un premier amour" performed by Isabelle Aubret in 1962 and "Un jour, un enfant" performed by Frida Boccara, who won in 1969 in a four-way tie with the Netherlands, Spain and the United Kingdom. France's fifth victory came in 1977, when Marie Myriam won with the song "L'oiseau et l'enfant". France have also finished second four times, with Paule Desjardins in 1957, Catherine Ferry in 1976, Joëlle Ursull in 1990 and Amina in 1991, who lost out to Sweden's Carola in a tie-break. In the 21st century, France has had less success, only making the top ten three times, with Natasha St-Pier finishing fourth in 2001, Sandrine François finishing fifth in 2002 and Patricia Kaas finishing eighth in 2009. In 2015, the nation finished in twenty-fourth place with the song "N'oubliez pas" performed by Lisa Angell.

The French national broadcaster, France Télévisions, broadcasts the event within France and delegates the selection of the nation's entry to the television channel France 2. France 2 confirmed that France would participate in the 2016 Eurovision Song Contest on 27 May 2015. The French broadcaster had used both national finals and internal selection to choose the French entry in the past. The 2014 French entry was selected via a national final that featured three competing acts. In 2015, the broadcaster opted to internally select the French entry, a procedure that was continued in order to select the 2016 entry.

== Before Eurovision ==
=== Internal selection ===
France 2 announced in late 2015 that the French entry for the 2016 Eurovision Song Contest would be selected internally. The organisation of the internal selection was headed by France 2 entertainment director Nathalie André and the newly appointed French Head of Delegation for the Eurovision Song Contest Edoardo Grassi. The broadcaster opened a submission period on 30 September 2015 in order for interested artists and songwriters to submit their proposals up until the deadline on 31 October 2015. Francophone performers 16 to 50 years of age and of any nationality were eligible for consideration, while songs were required to contain at least 80% French language lyrics with a free language allowance for the remaining lyrics. At the closing of the deadline, the French broadcaster received 280 submissions.

On 29 February 2016, France 2 announced that the French entry for the Eurovision Song Contest 2016 would be "J'ai cherché" performed by Amir. The song was written by Amir, Nazim Khaled and Johan Errami and contains lyrics in a bilingual mix of French and English. France 2 had originally planned to reveal the entry on 12 March 2016, however, information that Amir would represent France at the Eurovision Song Contest 2016 was leaked on 25 February 2016 during the D8TV talk show programme Touche pas à mon poste!, hosted by Cyril Hanouna. The artistic committee of France Télévisions considered two entries, "J'ai cherché" performed by Amir and "Alive" performed by Sasha, before finalising their decision internally on 10 January 2016. "J'ai cherché" was edited and remixed by Skydancers and Nazim Khaled at the request of the French broadcaster since the song exceeded three minutes in its original version, which had already been released as the first single from Amir's forthcoming album. The entry was formally presented to the public on 12 March 2016 during the France 2 programme The DiCaire Show, hosted by Véronic DiCaire.

=== Promotion ===
Amir made several appearances across Europe to specifically promote "J'ai cherché" as the French Eurovision entry. On 9 April, Amir performed during the Eurovision in Concert event which was held at the Melkweg venue in Amsterdam, Netherlands and hosted by Cornald Maas and Hera Björk. Amir performed "J'ai cherché" in the Netherlands during the RTL 4 programme Carlo's TV Café on 10 April. Between 11 and 13 April, Amir took part in promotional activities in Tel Aviv, Israel and performed during the Israel Calling event held at the Ha'teatron venue. On 17 April, Amir performed during the London Eurovision Party, which was held at the Café de Paris venue in London, United Kingdom and hosted by Nicki French and Paddy O'Connell.

In addition to his international appearances, Amir also promoted "J'ai cherché" in France along with his album Au cœur de moi, which was released on 29 April. On 13 March, Amir performed the song during the France 3 programme Du côté de chez Dave. In the final week of April, Amir appeared in several television talk shows and radio shows where, among his appearances, he performed "J'ai cherché" during the France 2 programmes Vivement dimanche and Thé ou Café and the France 5 programme C à vous.

== At Eurovision ==
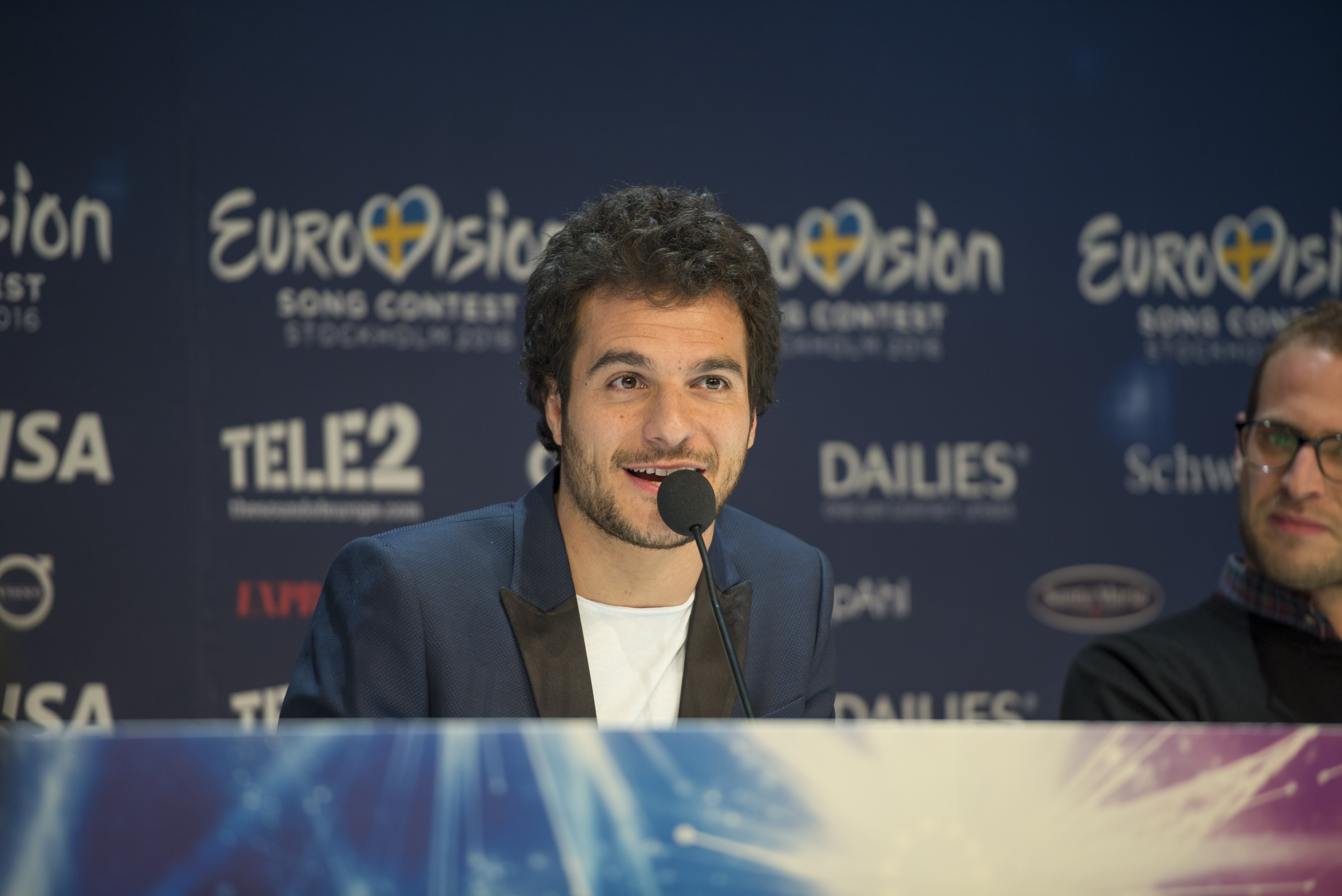
Amir during a press meet and greet

According to Eurovision rules, all nations with the exceptions of the host country and the "Big Five" (France, Germany, Italy, Spain and the United Kingdom) are required to qualify from one of two semi-finals in order to compete for the final; the top ten countries from each semi-final progress to the final. As a member of the "Big Five", France automatically qualified to compete in the final on 14 May 2016. In addition to their participation in the final, France is also required to broadcast and vote in one of the two semi-finals. During the semi-final allocation draw on 25 January 2016, France was assigned to broadcast and vote in the first semi-final on 10 May 2016.

In France, the two semi-finals was broadcast on France 4 with commentary by Marianne James and Jarry, while the final was broadcast on France 2 with commentary by Stéphane Bern and Marianne James. This marked the first time that both semi-finals would be broadcast in France since the two semi-final format for the Eurovision Song Contest was introduced in 2008. The broadcast of the semi-finals also moved back to France 4 with the aim of giving the semi-finals a wider audience; since 2011, the broadcaster would only air the semi-final France was required to vote in on France Ô, a channel devoted to programming from the French overseas departments and collectivities. The French spokesperson, who announced the top 12-point score awarded by the French jury during the final, was Élodie Gossuin.

=== Final ===
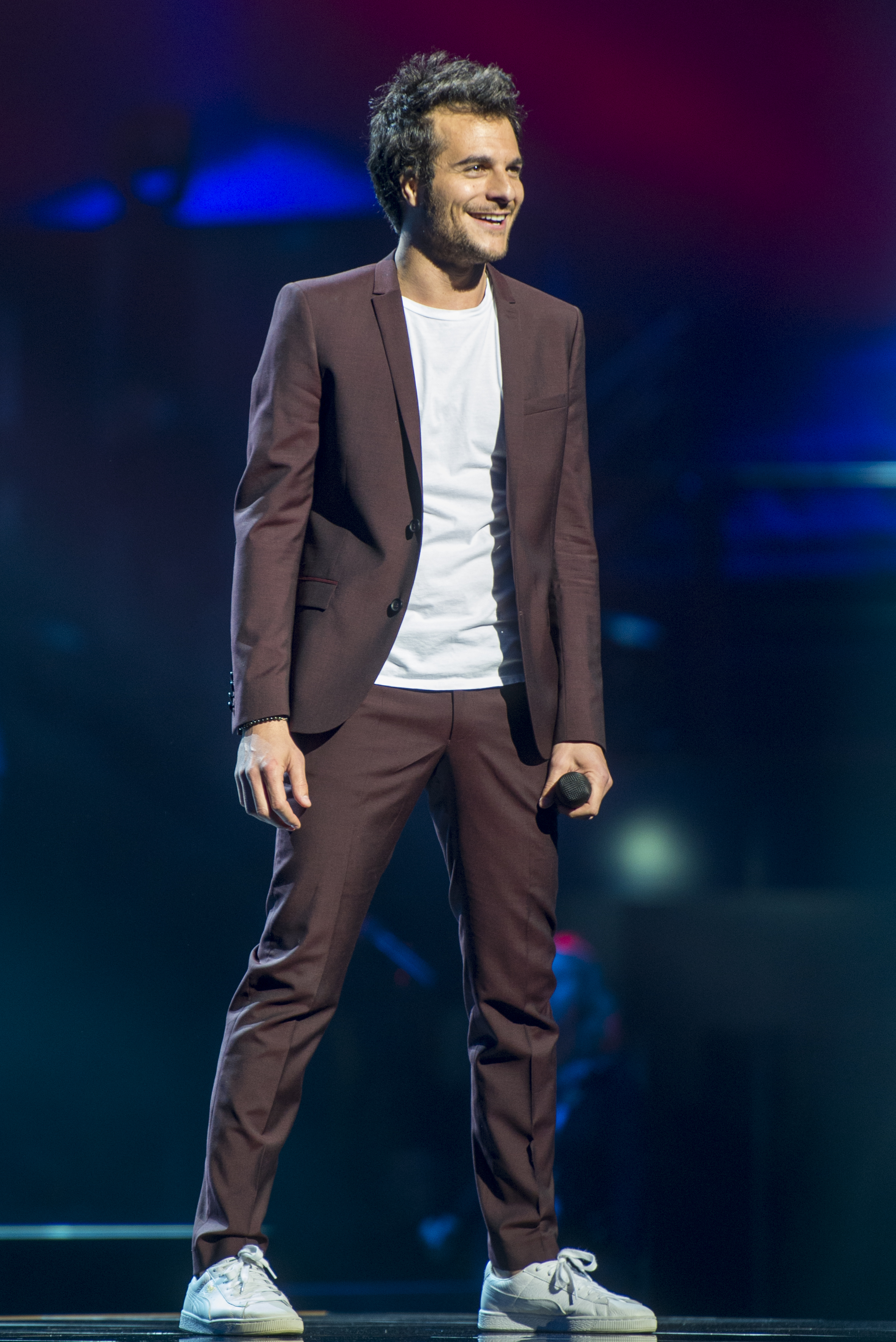
Amir during a rehearsal before the final

Amir took part in technical rehearsals on 6 and 8 May, followed by dress rehearsals on 9, 13 and 14 May. This included the semi-final jury show on 9 May where an extended clip of the French performance was filmed for broadcast during the live show on 10 May and the jury final on 13 May where the professional juries of each country watched and voted on the competing entries. During the opening ceremony festivities that took place on 8 May, Amir took part in a draw to determine in which half of the final the French entry would be performed. France was drawn to compete in the first half. Following the conclusion of the second semi-final, the shows' producers decided upon the running order of the final. The running order for the semi-finals and final was decided by the shows' producers rather than through another draw, so that similar songs were not placed next to each other. France was subsequently placed to perform in position 11, following the entry from Germany and before the entry from Poland.

The French performance featured Amir on stage alone dressed in a suit with a white shirt. The stage colours were predominately blue with purple and white lighting and the LED screens displayed planets and a starry galaxy. The stage was lit up in the colours of the French flag at the conclusion of the performance. Amir was joined by four off-stage backing vocalists: Delphine Elbé, Fred D'Angelo, Ivan Pavlak and Lars Hägglund. France placed sixth in the final, scoring 257 points: 109 points from the televoting and 148 points from the juries.

=== Voting ===
Voting during the three shows was conducted under a new system that involved each country now awarding two sets of points from 1-8, 10 and 12: one from their professional jury and the other from televoting. Each nation's jury consisted of five music industry professionals who are citizens of the country they represent, with their names published before the contest to ensure transparency. This jury judged each entry based on: vocal capacity; the stage performance; the song's composition and originality; and the overall impression by the act. In addition, no member of a national jury was permitted to be related in any way to any of the competing acts in such a way that they cannot vote impartially and independently. The individual rankings of each jury member as well as the nation's televoting results were released shortly after the grand final.

Below is a breakdown of points awarded to France and awarded by France in the first semi-final and grand final of the contest, and the breakdown of the jury voting and televoting conducted during the two shows:

==== Points awarded to France ====
Points awarded to France (Final)
Score	Televote	Jury
12 points	Israel	Armenia
10 points	Spain	Albania
8 points	Belgium	Belgium; Croatia; Israel; Sweden
7 points	Armenia; Australia	Austria; Bosnia and Herzegovina; Cyprus; Italy; Russia; Spain
6 points	Cyprus; Moldova	Australia; Greece; Malta; United Kingdom
5 points	Iceland; Italy	Czech Republic; Montenegro; Netherlands
4 points	Azerbaijan; Bosnia and Herzegovina; Greece; Netherlands	Georgia
3 points	Finland; Lithuania; Russia; Sweden; Switzerland	Ireland
2 points	Croatia; Denmark; Estonia; Malta	Iceland
1 point	Austria; Hungary; Montenegro; Norway	Estonia; Finland; Lithuania; Poland

==== Points awarded by France ====
Points awarded by France (Semi-final 1)
Score	Televote	Jury
12 points	Armenia	Austria
10 points	Austria	Malta
8 points	Russia	Netherlands
7 points	Hungary	Azerbaijan
6 points	Bosnia and Herzegovina	Croatia
5 points	Cyprus	Hungary
4 points	Netherlands	Cyprus
3 points	Czech Republic	Armenia
2 points	Moldova	Russia
1 point	Croatia	Czech Republic

Points awarded by France (Final)
Score	Televote	Jury
12 points	Armenia	Italy
10 points	Ukraine	Bulgaria
8 points	Austria	Austria
7 points	Poland	Netherlands
6 points	Russia	Australia
5 points	Bulgaria	Sweden
4 points	Belgium	Malta
3 points	Israel	Spain
2 points	Sweden	Armenia
1 point	Spain	Russia

==== Detailed voting results ====
The following members comprised the French jury:

- Roberto Ciurleo (jury chairperson) – music producer, radio channel manager
- Sarah Caillibot – artist, singer
- Léa Ivanne – singer and songwriter
- Dominique Mattei (Dumè) – artist
- Thomas Pat Angeli – radio journalist, music specialist

Detailed voting results from France (Semi-final 1)
R/O	Country	Jury							Televote	
R/O	Country	R. Ciurleo	S. Caillibot	L. Ivanne	Dumè	T.P. Angeli	Rank	Points	Rank	Points
01	Finland	12	8	13	9	13	12		18	
02	Greece	16	18	15	13	7	15		14	
03	Moldova	14	17	8	15	2	13		9	2
04	Hungary	7	2	5	14	6	6	5	4	7
05	Croatia	3	11	4	8	8	5	6	10	1
06	Netherlands	1	10	6	5	1	3	8	7	4
07	Armenia	9	4	3	11	11	8	3	1	12
08	San Marino	15	16	18	17	12	16		13	
09	Russia	11	7	9	10	3	9	2	3	8
10	Czech Republic	10	9	11	3	15	10	1	8	3
11	Cyprus	8	12	2	4	10	7	4	6	5
12	Austria	2	3	1	2	5	1	12	2	10
13	Estonia	6	13	10	6	14	11		15	
14	Azerbaijan	5	6	12	7	4	4	7	16	
15	Montenegro	17	14	16	16	17	17		17	
16	Iceland	13	5	14	12	16	14		11	
17	Bosnia and Herzegovina	18	15	17	18	18	18		5	6
18	Malta	4	1	7	1	9	2	10	12	

Detailed voting results from France (Final)
R/O	Country	Jury							Televote	
R/O	Country	R. Ciurleo	S. Caillibot	L. Ivanne	Dumè	T.P. Angeli	Rank	Points	Rank	Points
01	Belgium	16	19	10	16	5	12		7	4
02	Czech Republic	17	11	12	12	14	11		23	
03	Netherlands	2	6	11	8	3	4	7	15	
04	Azerbaijan	22	14	13	15	4	14		20	
05	Hungary	21	13	14	21	11	20		14	
06	Italy	1	9	1	1	13	1	12	11	
07	Israel	9	23	21	2	22	17		8	3
08	Bulgaria	3	3	4	6	10	2	10	6	5
09	Sweden	10	1	5	5	12	6	5	9	2
10	Germany	24	7	8	14	17	16		18	
11	France									
12	Poland	25	22	25	24	20	25		4	7
13	Australia	4	4	3	4	15	5	6	12	
14	Cyprus	14	16	15	17	16	18		13	
15	Serbia	15	21	22	25	24	22		17	
16	Lithuania	19	12	20	11	18	21		19	
17	Croatia	11	18	16	13	9	13		24	
18	Russia	18	10	9	20	6	10	1	5	6
19	Spain	8	5	7	19	2	8	3	10	1
20	Latvia	23	24	19	23	23	23		22	
21	Ukraine	12	2	24	10	21	15		2	10
22	Malta	6	17	6	3	8	7	4	25	
23	Georgia	20	25	23	22	25	24		21	
24	Austria	7	8	2	9	1	3	8	3	8
25	United Kingdom	5	20	18	18	19	19		16	
26	Armenia	13	15	17	7	7	9	2	1	12
