= Addictions (album) =

Studio album by Amir
- Released: 27 October 2017
- Recorded: 2016
- Genre: Pop (Variété française)
- Label: Warner Music Group
- Producer: Skydancers; Raphaël Nyadjiko; Renaud Rebillaud; High P; Eddy Pradelles; Fred Savio; Skalpovich; Pierre-Laurent Faure; Tiery F

Amir chronology
Au cœur de moi (2016)	Addictions (2017)	Ressources (2020)

Singles from Addictions
- 1. "No Vacancy" Released: May 2017; 2. "États d'Amour" Released: 25 August 2017; 3. "Les rues de ma peine" Released: 9 February 2018

Singles from Addictions (Deluxe Edition)
- 1. "Longtemps" Released: 17 August 2018; 2. "5 minutes avec toi" Released: 15 February 2019

Addictions is the third studio album and second major label album by French-Israeli singer Amir Haddad. It was released on 27 October 2017 in France through Warner Music Group. The album includes the singles "No Vacancy", "États d'Amour" and "Les Rues de ma peine". The album was re-released on 9 November 2018 and includes the singles "Longtemps" and "5 minutes avec toi". The album was re-released one more time on May 17, 2019, as an "ultimate edition".

== Background ==
On 25 August 2017, Amir announced on Facebook that he would be releasing his new album on 27 October 2017 and the album would include the single "États d'Amour". He announced the title of the album to be Addictions on 7 September 2017, he also unveiled the album's cover art.

== Critical reception ==
Katie Wilson from Wiwibloggs said, "there isn’t one track on the album that has been rushed or overlooked [...] combining upbeat pop with more mellow and heartfelt sounds [...] While he sings in French, his style is all-American, bringing in one of those classically lyricless techno choruses that bears resemblance to One Republic, from across the pond.". "Opium" was noted specifically as a standout track.

== Track listing ==
Standard Edition
No.	Title	Writer(s)	Producer(s)	Length
1.	"Que seront les hommes ?"	Amir Haddad; Nazim Khaled; Raphaël Nyadjiko	Skydancers; Raphaël Nyadjiko	2:58
2.	"États d'Amour"	Haddad; Khaled; Renaud Rebillaud	Skydancers; Renaud Rebillaud	3:40
3.	"Tout passe"	Haddad; Khaled; Tété	High P	3:43
4.	"Les rues de ma peine"	Haddad; Khaled; Eddy Pradelles	Eddy Pradelles	3:44
5.	"Il était une femme"	Haddad; Khaled; Jérémy Poligné; Guillaume Boscaro; Alexandra Maquet	Fred Savio	2:52
6.	"Le cœur dans les cordes"	Haddad; Khaled; Silvio Lisbonne	Skydancers	3:07
7.	"Sors de ma tête"	Haddad; Khaled; Skalpovich	Skalpovich	4:05
8.	"L'amourant"	Haddad; Tété; Davide Esposito	High P	2:55
9.	"Opium"	Haddad; Khaled; Laurent Wilthien; Matthieu Tosi; Jean-Noël Wilthien	Skydancers	3:16
10.	"Que le temps s'arrête"	Haddad; Khaled; Pierre-Laurent Faure; Adrien Levron	Pradelles; Pierre-Laurent Faure	3:30
11.	"Idéale idylle" (feat. Lital)	Haddad; Khaled	Tiery F	3:31
12.	"Laisse la vie faire"	Haddad; Khaled; Nyadjiko	Nyadjiko	3:45
13.	"No Vacancy" (OneRepublic featuring Amir)	Haddad; Tor Erik Hermansen; Ryan Tedder; Mikkel Storleer Eriksen	Stargate; Tedder	3:43
14.	"La nuit"	Haddad; Khaled; Lisbonne; Pradelles	Pradelles	3:21
15.	"Anja"	Khaled; Boscaro	Pradelles; Boscaro	5:38
16.	"Et toi" (bonus track)			3:04
17.	"L'impasse" (bonus track)			2:41
18.	"Boréale aurore" (bonus track)			3:58

Deluxe Edition
No.	Title	Writer(s)	Producer(s)	Length
1.	"Longtemps"	Khaled; Assaf Tzrouya	Tiery F; Assaf Tzrouya	3:39
2.	"Smile"			3:17
3.	"French Kiss"			3:07
4.	"Parfait déséquilibre"			3:40
5.	"5 minutes avec toi"			3:02
6.	"Imagine"			3:56
7.	"Réflexions"			3:11
8.	"Autour de moi"			3:06
9.	"Qu'est ce qu'on gardera"			2:53
10.	"Lune"			3:26
11.	"Sal de Mi Mente"			4:04
12.	"Si t'as mal"			2:36
13.	"Higher"			3:08
14.	"Imagine... The Answer"			3:56

Ultimate Edition
No.	Title	Length
1.	"Longtemps"	3:39
2.	"Les rues de ma peine"	3:44
3.	"Smile"	3:43
4.	"États d'Amour"	3:44
5.	"Que seront les hommes?"	2:52
6.	"La nuit"	3:07
7.	"Sors de ma tête"	4:05
8.	"Anja"	2:55
9.	"5 minutes avec toi"	3:16
10.	"Le coeur dans les corders"	3:30
11.	"Imagine"	3:31
12.	"Que le temps s'arrête"	3:45
13.	"Parfait déséquilibre"	3:43
14.	"Laisse la vie faire"	3:21
15.	"Réflexions"	5:38
16.	"Qu'est ce qu'on gardera?"	3:04
17.	"Tout passe"	2:41
18.	"Lune"	3:58
19.	"Si t'as mal"
20.	"Idéale idylle" (Feat. lital)
21.	"Il était une femme"
22.	"100 years"

== Charts ==
=== Weekly charts ===
Chart (2017)	Peak position
Belgian Albums (Ultratop Wallonia)	8
French Albums (SNEP)	3
Swiss Albums (Schweizer Hitparade)	17

=== Year-end charts ===
Chart (2017)	Position
Belgian Albums (Ultratop Wallonia)	72
French Albums (SNEP)	47

Chart (2018)	Position
Belgian Albums (Ultratop Wallonia)	17
French Albums (SNEP)	25

== Certifications ==
Region	Certification	Certified units/sales
Belgium (BEA)	Gold	10,000^{‡}
France (SNEP)	3× Platinum	300,000^{‡}
^{‡} Sales+streaming figures based on certification alone.

== Release history ==
Country	Date	Label	Format
France	27 October 2017	Warner Music Group	Digital download; CD
France	9 November 2018	Warner Music Group	Digital download; CD
France	17 May 2019	Warner Music Group	Digital download; CD
