= Claudio Capéo (album) =

Studio album by Claudio Capéo
- Released: 15 July 2016
- Recorded: 2015
- Label: Jo & Co
- Producer: Doutson; Jérémy Poligné; Eddy Pradelles; Skalpovich; Silvio Lisbonne; Franck Authié; Nazim Khaled

Claudio Capéo chronology
Mr. Jack (2015)	Claudio Capéo (2016)	Tant que rien ne m'arrête (2018)

Singles from Claudio Capéo
- 1. "Un homme debout" Released: 5 February 2016; 2. "Ça va ça va" Released: 28 September 2016; 3. "Riche" Released: 28 February 2017; 4. "Dis le moi" Released: 26 October 2017

Claudio Capéo is the third studio album from French singer Claudio Capéo. It was released on 15 July 2016 by Jo & Co. A deluxe edition was released on 11 November 2016 and includes four live songs. The album includes the singles "Un homme debout", "Ça va ça va" and "Riche". The album has peaked at number 1 on the French Albums Chart.

== Commercial performance ==
On 23 July 2016, the album entered the French Albums Chart at number 1 in its first week of release, the album stayed at number 1 for five consecutive weeks and went on to be certified three times platinum with sales of 300,000 copies by the beginning of 2017. On 27 August 2016, the album entered the Belgian Walloon Albums Chart at number 87, peaking at number 9.

== Singles ==
"Un homme debout" was released as the lead single from the album on 5 February 2016. The song peaked at number 6 on the French Singles Chart. "Ça va ça va" was released as the second single from the album on 28 September 2016. The song peaked at number 23 on the French Singles Chart. "Riche" was released as the third single from the album on 28 February 2017. The song peaked at number 27 on the French Singles Chart. "Dis le moi" was released as the fourth single from the album on 26 October 2017. The song peaked at number 191 on the French Singles Chart.

== Track listing ==
Standard edition
No.	Title	Writer(s)	Producer(s)	Length
1.	"Un homme debout"	Mamadou Niakaté; Ansley Ford; Jean-Pascal Anziani; Sylvain Hagopian; Ricardo Cessaut	Doutson	3:26
2.	"Ça fait tourner le monde"	Jérémy Poligné; Mark Hékic	Jérémy Poligné; Eddy Pradelles	2:55
3.	"Ça va ça va"	Manon Romiti; Silvio Lisbonne; Nazim Khaled; Eddy Pradelles	Pradelles	3:11
4.	"Je vous embrasse fort"	Skalpovich; Karim Deneyer; Khalid Ahlalou	Skalpovich	3:23
5.	"Ambulance"	Khaled; Pradelles; Guillaume Boscaro	Lisbonne; Pradelles	3:59
6.	"Fidèle à moi-même"	Niakaté; Anziani; Sylvain Hagopian	Doutson	3:09
7.	"Dis le moi"	Romiti; Lisbonne; Khaled; Pradelles	Pradelles	3:40
8.	"Mon pays"	Niakaté; Anziani; Hagopian	Doutson	3:19
9.	"Belle France"	Claudio Ruccolo	Franck Authié; Khaled	2:44
10.	"Sexy Tropical"	Ruccolo	Authié; Khaled	3:27
11.	"Chez Laurette"	Michel Delpech; Roland Vincent	Authié; Khaled	3:32
12.	"Enfants sauvages"	Khaled; Boscaro; Alexandra Maquet	Authié	3:17
13.	"Riche"	Manon Romiti; Lisbonne; Khaled; Mark Hekic	Authié; Khaled	4:03

Deluxe edition
No.	Title	Length
14.	"Ça va ça va" (live version)	3:38
15.	"Sexy Tropical" (live version)	4:27
16.	"Jusqu'à la mort" (live version)	5:35
17.	"Mr Jack" (live version)	3:54

== Charts ==
=== Weekly charts ===
Chart (2016–17)	Peak position
Belgian Albums (Ultratop Wallonia)	9
French Albums (SNEP)	1
Swiss Albums (Schweizer Hitparade)	24

=== Year-end charts ===
Chart (2016)	Position
Belgian Albums (Ultratop Wallonia)	73
French Albums (SNEP)	12
Chart (2017)	Position
Belgian Albums (Ultratop Wallonia)	23
French Albums (SNEP)	10
Chart (2018)	Position
Belgian Albums (Ultratop Wallonia)	177

== Certifications ==
Region	Certification	Certified units/sales
France (SNEP)	Diamond	500,000^{‡}
^{‡} Sales+streaming figures based on certification alone.

== Release history ==
Region	Date	Format	Label
France	15 July 2016	Digital download; CD	Jo & Co
