= Davide Esposito =

Italian singer and songwriter

Davide Esposito is a singer and songwriter.

== Biography ==
Davide Esposito was born in Naples, Italy and grew up in the 1980s listening to the music of Lucio Dalla and Lucio Battisti. He is a musician, producer, singer, author, and composer. His usual instruments are piano, guitar, and bass guitar.

He wrote songs and music for Amir, Tina Arena, Amel Bent, Cindy Daniel, Celine Dion, Élodie Frégé, Fujisawa, Garou, Kendji Girac, Martin Giroux, Johnny Hallyday, Murray Head, Ishtar, Kelly Joyce, Patricia Kaas, Serge Lama, Grégory Lemarchal, Nolwenn Leroy, Michal, Mickaël Miro, Emmanuel Moire, Yelena Neva, Vincent Niclo, Norimasa, Olympe, Dejan Ozarevic, Florent Pagny, Mario Pelchat, M. Pokora, Edu del Prado, Lilian Renaud, Saya, Hélène Ségara, Sylvie Vartan, Amaury Vassili, and Joey Young.

His songs represent over 12,000,000 albums and singles sold in France and in countries around the world (including US, Canada, Mexico, Belgium, Switzerland, Russia, China, Germany, Japan, Taiwan, Australia, Italy).

Esposito has worked with Abril, Tina Arena, Quentin Bachelet, Isabelle Bernal, Mattias Blomdahl, Benoit Carré, Eric Chemouny, Emmanuelle Cosso, Lionel Florence, Franck Fossey, Brendan Graham, Yann Guillon, Murray Head, Henrik Janson, Nick Jarl, Remi Lacroix, Jean-Felix Lalanne, Katia Landréas, Grégory Lemarchal, Matthieu Mendès, Christophe Miossec, Mogol, Quentin Mosimann, Yelena Neva, Tony Nilsson, Luc Plamondon, Edu del Prado, Renaud Rebillaud, Stanislas Renoult, Christian Walz, François Welgryn, Ycare, and Marie-Jo Zarb.

He played the first parts of several artists' concerts Christophe Maé, Emmanuel Moire, Dany Brillant and took part in Jean-Félix Lalanne shows Autour de la guitare and Double jeu.

== Albums ==
Davide Esposito released three albums between 2007 and 2015.

- Amore Eterno

The first album, Amore Eterno (Eternal love), including the single Io so che tu, was released in December 2007 at Peermusic/Warner Music France. The song Io so che tu was part of the top 20 of the French charts and was performed by Grégory Lemarchal with the French title Écris l'histoire (March 2005). Most of the 15 songs of the album were written in Italian. But some others were released in French (Elle était là, lyrics by Lionel Florence, Que toi au monde, written with Luc Plamondon and performed by Céline Dion on her album Sans attendre).

- Un uomo

The second album Un uomo was released on 14 at AZ. The first single Ti amo enters the Top 10. The album is made of 12 songs, including two duets, one with Julien Doré Via da te and another one with Claudia Cardinale Dolce Vita.

- Roma California

The third album, Roma California, was born in 2015. It consists of Californian songs adapted in Italian by Davide, including a duet with Nina Zilli. The album entered the iTunes Top 10 and the Top 20 of French charts. More than 40,000 copies are sold.

== Awards and honors ==
- Vincent Scotto Sacem Award in 2008 for the song De temps en temps written for Gregory Lemarchal [Song of the Year]
- UNAC Prize (Union des compositeurs français – French Composers Union) in 2012 for the song Juste pour me souvenir composed for Nolwenn Leroy
- SACEM Prize on 2016, December 5 Composer of the Year. The prize is given to Davide by Claudia Cardinale at the Parisian Folies Bergère.
- Prix de la Création Musicale in 2017 Composer of the Year
- Prix de la Création Musicale in 2017 Composer of the Year

== Discography ==
- Amore Eterno (2007)
- Un uomo (2010)
- Roma California (2015)

=== Collaborations ===
In seven years, 44 songs composed by Davide entered the Top 20 of several countries' charts France, Canada, Australia, Belgium, Switzerland, Italy and Hong Kong.

- 2003 Vivre la vie Kelly Joyce No. 1
- 2004 Baryton, Florent Pagny, No. 1
- 2004 Italian Love Song, Tina Arena, No. 10
- 2004 La neige en été, Give Me a Reason, Ouvre-moi le ciel, Je ne plaisante pas, Tu sei dentro di me, Sylvie Vartan
- 2004 Viens jusqu'à moi, Élodie Frégé and Michal, No. 8
- 2005 Écris l'histoire, Grégory Lemarchal, No. 2
- 2005 Mon ange, Grégory Lemarchal
- 2006 Là où je pars, Emmanuel Moire
- 2006 Le monde où je vais, Mario Pelchat, No. 1
- 2007 De temps en temps, Grégory Lemarchal, No. 1
- 2008 Le tout premier jour, Cindy Daniel, No. 1
- 2008 Restons amis, Grégory Lemarchal, No. 9
- 2009 Cléopâtre
- 2009 Vincero, Amaury Vassili
- 2012 Dracula, l'amour plus fort que la mort
- 2012 Juste pour me souvenir, Nolwenn Leroy
- 2012 Sauve-toi, M. Pokora
- 2012 Un nouveau jour, Johnny Hallyday
- 2012 Que toi au monde, Céline Dion
- 2013 J'apprendrai, Mickaël Miro
- 2013 Merci, Olympe
- 2013 Toutes mes erreurs, Tu sais, Garou
- 2014 C'est simple, Olympe
- 2014 Amore puro, Vincent Niclo
- 2014 Jusqu'à l'ivresse, Vincent Niclo
- 2014 L'amour est enfant du poème, Vincent Niclo
- 2015 C'est Trop, Kendji Girac
- 2015 Ma Solitude, Kendji Girac
- 2015 Pour ne plus avoir peur, Lilian Renaud
- 2016 A ta manière, Amir
- 2016 Je serai là, Serge Lama
- 2016 Sans Nous, Patricia Kaas
- 2016 Tourne moi la tête, Ishtar
- 2017 Ce que tu m'as appris, Arcadian
- 2017 Ecris l'histoire, Kids United
- 2017 Et après, Lou
- 2017 Le garçon du couloir, Lou
- 2017 Maintenant, Caroline Costa
- 2017 Ton amourant, Amir
- 2017 Ton combat, Arcadian
- 2018 A perte de rue (live) Zaz
- 2018 Adieu je t'aime Ycare
- 2018 Ali di libertà Andrea Bocelli
- 2018 Donde estas Ludan
- 2018 Je reviens Claudio Capéo
- 2018 L'instant suprême Ycare
- 2018 La lumière ou la rage Claudio Capéo
- 2018 Que Dieu me pardonne Claudio Capéo, duo avec Kendji Girac
- 2018 Que Dieu me pardonne Kendji Girac, duo avec Claudio Capéo
- 2018 Que Vendra Zaz
- 2018 SI c'était a refaire Zaz
- 2019 Besoin d'air Lou
- 2019 Donne-moi Lou
- 2019 J'ai su Anaïs Delva
