= Kemmler (rapper) =

French rapper (born 1990)

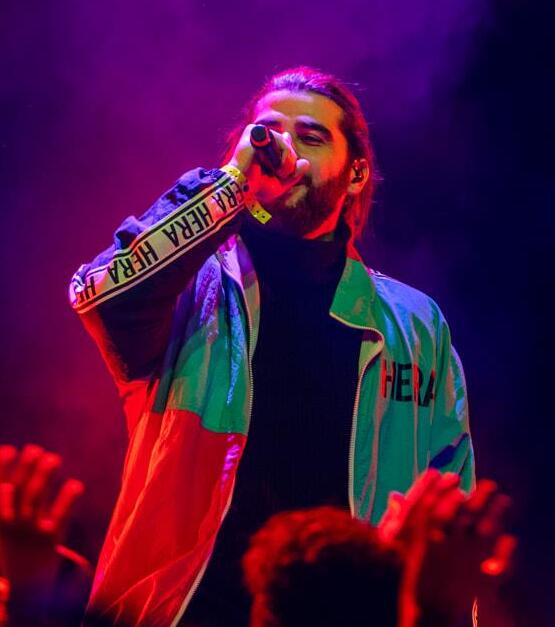
- Kemmler in 2020

Background information
- Born: Yoann Haouzi; 1 January 1990 (age 36); Marseille, France
- Genres: French rap, political hip hop, alternative hip hop
- Occupations: Rapper, singer, songwriter
- Years active: 2004–present
- Label: Def Jam France

Yoann Haouzi (born 1 January 1990), known professionally as Kemmler or Kem, is a French rapper. Before starting solo career, he was a member of the duo "Renega".

== Biography ==
Yoann Haouzi (Kemmler) was born in Marseille and made his first steps in the musical world at the age of 14. There he created a duo "Renega" with his friend Verbal, which quickly lead them to success on stage and rap competitions in Marseille. Currently living between Paris and Marseille, Kem is pursuing solo career as a rapper and composer. His collaborations include Amir Haddad, Nazim Khaled, Stav Beger, Mosimann, Youssoupha, Banx & Ranx, Elyot Milshtein, Nae and others. His latest albul Alain is dedicated to his father. A single "Sommet", that he co-wrote with Amir and Nazim was selected to be an official theme of the 2024 Summer Olympics on French TV.

== Discography ==
=== Albums ===
- 2018: Rose
- 2020: Gris
- 2020: Cœur
- 2022: &Moi
- 2024: Alain, in collaboration with Mosimann, Nazim Khaled, Banx & Ranx
