= La fête (song) =

Single by Amir

from the album Ressources
- Released: 10 June 2020
- Length: 3:12
- Label: Parlophone; Warner Music Group
- Songwriters: Amir Haddad; Nazim Khaled
- Producer: Assaf Tzrouya

Amir singles chronology
"5 minutes avec toi" (2019)	"La fête" (2020)	"On verra bien" (2020)

"La fête" is a song performed by French-Israeli singer Amir Haddad. The song was released as a digital download on 10 June 2020 by Parlophone and Warner Music Group as the lead single from his fourth studio album Ressources. The song was written by Amir Haddad and Nazim Khaled.

== Background ==
Speaking to Le Parisien, Amir said that he had written this song well before the COVID-19 lockdowns, and said "I want it to become the song where at each party with friends, in your house or in a bar or on vacation, you will put it on and that's when everyone will lose it, throw towels in the air, raise their glasses and dance like crazy."

== Critical reception ==
Jonathan Vautrey from Wiwibloggs said, "Starting with an electric guitar riff, the song utilises a mixture of percussion instrumentation. While not a full-on party feel as the title might suggest, the melody is still relatively danceable. Lyrically, Amir sings about forgetting your troubles and enjoying life to its fullest: 'You're tired from yesterday again / It's nothing / We'll think about it tomorrow … We were all born to party / As if we'd never done it before'."

== Music video ==
A music video to accompany the release of "La fête" was first released onto YouTube on 17 June 2020.

== Track listing ==
Digital download
No.	Title	Length
1.	"La fête"	3:12

Digital download
No.	Title	Length
1.	"La fête" (Remix)	2:51

== Personnel ==
Credits adapted from Tidal.

- Assaf Tzrouya – producer, composer, choir vocals, guitar, keyboards, programming, recorded by
- Amir Haddad – composer, A&R direction, choir vocals, vocals, writer
- Nazim Khaled – composer, A&R direction, choir vocals, executive producer, writer
- Benjamin Marciano – A&R direction
- David Boukhobza – A&R direction, executive producer
- Silvio Lisbonne – A&R direction, choir vocals, executive producer
- Guy Dan – bass
- Itzik Kedem – choir, percussion
- 7 Jaws – choir vocals
- Eddy Paradelles – choir vocals
- Idan Bakshi – choir vocals, guitar
- Lital Haddad – choir vocals
- Matan Dror – choir vocals, keyboards, programming
- Mor Uzan – choir vocals, guitar, keyboards, programming
- Pierre-Laurent Faure – choir vocals
- Rubens Hazon – choir vocals
- Tiborg – masterer
- Jérémie Tuil – mixer
- Cynthia Chavan-Letsher – production coordinator

== Charts ==
=== Weekly charts ===
Chart (2020)	Peak position
Belgium (Ultratip Bubbling Under Flanders)	–
Belgium (Ultratop 50 Wallonia)	9
France (SNEP)	149

=== Year-end charts ===
Chart (2020)	Position
Belgium (Ultratop Wallonia)	51

== Release history ==
Region	Date	Format	Label
France	30 June 2020	Digital download; streaming	Parlophone; Warner Music Group
