= Ma peau aime =

Studio album by Alma
- Released: 5 May 2017
- Recorded: 2014–2016
- Genre: Pop
- Label: Warner Music Group
- Producer: Nazim Khaled

Singles from Ma peau aime
- 1. "La chute est lente" Released: 10 June 2016; 2. "Requiem" Released: 13 January 2017

Ma peau aime is the debut studio album by French singer and songwriter Alma. It was released in France on 5 May 2017 by Warner Music Group. The album peaked at number 33 on the French Albums Chart.

== Singles ==
"La chute est lente" was released as the lead single from the album on 10 June 2016. "Requiem" was released as the second single from the album on 13 January 2017. The song peaked at number 25 on the French Singles Chart. On 9 February 2017, France 2 announced that Alma would represent the France at the 2017 Eurovision Song Contest at the International Exhibition Centre in Kyiv, Ukraine. As a member of the "Big 5", France automatically qualified to compete in the final which took place on 13 May 2017, Alma finished 12th with 135 points.

== Track listing ==
No.	Title	Writer(s)	Producer(s)	Length
1.	"Requiem"	Alma; Nazim Khaled	Nazim Khaled	3:03
2.	"La chute est lente"	Alma; Khaled	Khaled	3:23
3.	"Ivre"	Khaled; Pierre Jaconelli	Khaled	3:08
4.	"L'Autre Joug"	Khaled	Khaled	2:57
5.	"Ma peau aime"	Alma; Khaled; Jérémy Poligné	Khaled	2:58
6.	"8 Ans et des poussières"	Alma; Khaled; Poligné	Khaled	2:55
7.	"À demi pardonnée"	Alma; Khaled; Renaud Rebillaud	Khaled	3:31
8.	"Avec des est-ce"	Khaled	Khaled	3:20
9.	"Après l'aurore"	Khaled; David Gategno	Khaled	3:32
10.	"L'Amour fou"	Alma; Khaled; Johan Errami	Khaled	3:01
11.	"Quand les vagues reviennent"	Alma; Khaled	Khaled	3:12
12.	"J'ai"	Alma; Khaled; Franck Authié	Khaled	3:10
13.	"Requiem" (Eurovision version)	Alma; Khaled	Khaled	3:00

== Charts ==
Chart (2017)	Peak position
Belgian Albums (Ultratop Wallonia)	79
French Albums (SNEP)	33

== Release history ==
Region	Date	Format	Label
France	5 May 2017	Digital download, CD	Warner Music Group
