= États d'Amour (song) =

Single by Amir

from the album Addictions
- Released: 25 August 2017
- Recorded: 2016
- Genre: Pop (Variété française)
- Length: 3:40
- Label: Warner Music Group
- Songwriter(s): Amir Haddad; Renaud Rebillaud; Nazim Khaled
- Producer(s): Renaud Rebillaud; Skydancers

Amir singles chronology
"No Vacancy" (2017)	"États d'Amour" (2017)	"Les rues de ma peine" (2018)

"États d'Amour" is a song performed by French-Israeli singer Amir Haddad. The song was released as a digital download on 25 August 2017 by Warner Music Group as the lead single from his upcoming third studio album Addictions (2017). The song was written by Amir Haddad, Renaud Rebillaud and Nazim Khaled. The song has peaked at number 15 on the French Singles Chart, and also charted in Belgium.

== Commercial performance ==
On 2 September 2017, the song entered the French Singles Chart at number 15 in its first week of release, making it Amir's third top 40 single in France, the song dropped to number 163 the following week.

== Lyric video ==
An official lyric video to accompany the release of "États d'Amour" was first released onto YouTube on 24 August 2017 at a total length of three minutes and thirty-eight seconds.

== Music video ==
An official music video to accompany the release of "États d'Amour" was first released onto YouTube on 20 September 2017 at a total length of three minutes and forty-six seconds.

== Track listing ==
Digital download
No.	Title	Length
1.	"États d'Amour"	3:40

== Charts ==
Chart (2017)	Peak position
Belgium (Ultratip Wallonia)	14
France (SNEP)	15

== Release history ==
Region	Date	Format	Label
France	25 August 2017	Digital download	Warner Music Group
