= 5 minutes avec toi =

Single by Amir

from the album Addictions (Deluxe Edition)
- Released: 15 February 2019
- Recorded: 2018
- Genre: Pop
- Length: 3:02
- Label: Warner Music Group
- Songwriter(s): Nazim Khaled; Eddy Pradelles
- Producer(s): Eddy Pradelles

Amir singles chronology
"Longtemps" (2018)	"5 minutes avec toi" (2019)	"La fête" (2020)

"5 minutes avec toi" is a song performed by French-Israeli singer Amir Haddad. The song was released as a digital download on 15 February 2019 as the second single from his re-released third studio album Addictions.

== Music video ==
A music video to accompany the release of "5 minutes avec toi" was first released onto YouTube on 12 April 2019 at a total length of five minutes and two seconds.

== Track listing ==
Digital download
No.	Title	Length
1.	"5 minutes avec toi"	3:02

== Charts ==
Chart (2019)	Peak position
Belgium (Ultratip Bubbling Under Wallonia)	1
France Singles Sales Chart (SNEP)	108

== Release history ==
Region	Date	Format	Label
France	15 February 2019	Digital download	Warner Music Group
