= On verra bien =

Single by Amir

from the album Ressources
- Released: 2 October 2020
- Length: 3:10
- Label: Parlophone; Warner Music Group
- Songwriters: 7 Jaws; Amir Haddad; Freddie Marche
- Producer: Fred Savio

Amir singles chronology
"La fête" (2020)	"On verra bien" (2020)	"Carrousel" (2021)

"On verra bien" is a song performed by French-Israeli singer Amir Haddad. The song was released as a digital download on 2 October 2020 by Parlophone and Warner Music Group as the second single from his fourth studio album Ressources. The song was written by 7 Jaws, Amir Haddad and Freddie Marche.

== Critical reception ==
Jonathan Vautrey from Wiwibloggs said, "The Eurovision 2016 star increases the tempo again compared to the last two singles and delivers a solid French-pop song. 'On verra bien' centres around a theme of perseverance [...] Although the man struggles to begin with, he eventually powers through with the encouragement of his fellow recruits."

== Music video ==
A music video to accompany the release of "On verra bien" was first released onto YouTube on 2 October 2020.

== Track listing ==
Digital download
No.	Title	Length
1.	"On verra bien"	3:10

== Personnel ==
Credits adapted from Tidal.

- Fred Savio – Producer, composer, keyboards, piano, programming, recorded by
- 7 Jwas – Composer, writer
- Amir Haddad – Composer, A&R direction, choir vocals, vocals, writer
- Felipe Saldivia – Composer, bass, drums, guitar
- Freddie Marche – Composer, writer
- Benjamin Marciano – A&R Direction
- David Boukhobza – A&R Direction, executive producer
- Nazim Khaled – A&R Direction, executive producer
- Silvio Lisbonne – A&R Direction, executive producer
- Idan Shneor – Guitar
- Manoli – Guitar
- Chris Gehringer – Masterer
- Yan Memmi – Mixer
- Cynthia Chavan-Letsher – Production Coordinator
- Arnold Ben Saad – Programming
- Ferhat – Violin

== Charts ==
Chart (2021)	Peak position
Belgium (Ultratop 50 Wallonia)	29
France (SNEP)	66

== Release history ==
Region	Date	Format	Label
France	2 October 2020	Digital download; streaming	Parlophone; Warner Music Group
