= Longtemps =

Single by Amir

from the album Addictions (Deluxe Edition)
- Released: 17 August 2018
- Recorded: 2017
- Length: 3:39
- Label: Warner Music Group
- Songwriters: Nazim Khaled; Assaf Tzrouya
- Producers: Tiery F; Assaf Tzrouya

Amir singles chronology
"Les rues de ma peine" (2018)	"Longtemps" (2018)	"5 minutes avec toi" (2019)

Music video
- "Longtemps" on YouTube

"Longtemps" is a song performed by French-Israeli singer Amir Haddad. The song was released as a digital download on 17 August 2018 as the lead single from his re-released third studio album Addictions. The song has charted in Belgium.

== Commercial performance ==
On 15 September 2018, the song entered the Ultratop 50 Wallonia chart at number 35, peaking at number 14. At the annual Fête de la Musique in Nîmes, the song won the 2019 Chanson de l'Année prize, giving Amir his second victory in three years as he had previously won the 2017 prize for "On dirait".

== Music video ==
A music video to accompany the release of "Longtemps" was first released onto YouTube on 17 August 2018 at a total length of three minutes and thirty-nine seconds.

== Track listing ==
Digital download
No.	Title	Length
1.	"Longtemps"	3:39

== Charts ==
=== Weekly charts ===
Chart (2018–19)	Peak position
Belgium (Ultratip Bubbling Under Flanders)	–
Belgium (Ultratop 50 Wallonia)	7
France (SNEP)	46

=== Year-end charts ===
Chart (2018)	Position
Belgium (Ultratop Wallonia)	78

== Certifications ==
Region	Certification	Certified units/sales
France (SNEP)	Platinum	200,000^{‡}
^{‡} Sales+streaming figures based on certification alone.

== Release history ==
Region	Date	Format	Label
France	17 August 2018	Digital download	Warner Music Group
