= Au cœur de moi (song) =

2017 single by Amir Haddad

Single by Amir

from the album Au cœur de moi
- Released: 6 February 2017
- Recorded: 2015
- Genre: Pop
- Length: 3:07
- Label: Warner Music Group
- Songwriter(s): Amir Haddad; Nazim Khaled; Silvio Lisbonne; Manon Romiti
- Producer(s): Tiery F

Amir singles chronology
"On dirait" (2016)	"Au cœur de moi" (2017)	"No Vacancy" (2017)

"Au cœur de moi" is a song performed by French-Israeli singer Amir Haddad. The song was released as a digital download on 6 February 2017 as the fourth single from his second studio album Au cœur de moi (2016). The song has peaked at number 111 on the French Singles Chart, the song also charted in Belgium. The song was written by Amir Haddad, Nazim Khaled, Silvio Lisbonne and Manon Romiti.

== Commercial performance ==
On 15 April 2017, the song entered the French Singles Chart at number 157, peaking at number 111 the following week.

== Music video ==
A music video to accompany the release of "Au cœur de moi" was first released onto YouTube on 30 March 2017 at a total length of three minutes and ten seconds.

== Track listing ==
Digital download
No.	Title	Length
1.	"Au cœur de moi"	3:07

== Charts ==
Chart (2017)	Peak position
Belgium (Ultratip Wallonia)	18
France (SNEP)	111

== Release history ==
Region	Date	Format	Label
France	6 February 2017	Digital download	Warner Music Group
