= Ça va ça va =

Single by Claudio Capéo

from the album Claudio Capéo
- Released: 28 September 2016
- Recorded: 2015
- Genre: Pop (Variété française)
- Length: 3:11
- Label: Jo & Co
- Songwriters: Manon Romiti; Silvio Lisbonne; Nazim Khaled; Eddy Pradelles
- Producer: Eddy Pradelles

Claudio Capéo singles chronology
| "Un homme debout" (2016) | "Ça va ça va" (2016) | "Riche" (2017) |

"Ça va ça va" is a song by French singer Claudio Capéo. The song was released as a digital download in France on 28 September 2016 by Jo & Co as the second single from his third studio album Claudio Capéo.. The song was written by Manon Romiti, Silvio Lisbonne, Nazim Khaled and Eddy Pradelles. The song peaked at number 23 on the French Singles Chart.

== Music video ==
A video to accompany the release of "Ça va ça va" was first released onto YouTube on 28 September 2016 at a total length of three minutes and nineteen seconds. The video was directed by Hobo & Mojo.

== Track listing ==
Digital download
| No. | Title | Length |
|---|---|---|
| 1. | "Ça va ça va" | 3:11 |

== Charts ==
=== Weekly charts ===
| Chart (2016–17) | Peak position |
|---|---|
| Belgium (Ultratop 50 Wallonia) | 9 |
| France (SNEP) | 23 |

=== Year-end charts ===
| Chart (2017) | Position |
|---|---|
| Belgium (Ultratop Wallonia) | 24 |

== Release history ==
| Region | Date | Format | Label |
|---|---|---|---|
| France | 28 September 2016 | Digital download | Jo & Co |
