= Au cœur de moi =

Studio album by Amir
- Released: 29 April 2016
- Recorded: 2014/15
- Genre: Pop
- Length: 42:15
- Label: Warner Music Group
- Producer: Skydancers; Tiery F; Felipe Saldivia; Fred Savio; Nyadjiko; The Bionix

Amir chronology
Vayehi (2011)	Au cœur de moi (2016)	Addictions (2017)

Singles from Au cœur de moi
- 1. "Oasis" Released: 25 June 2015; 2. "J'ai cherché" Released: 15 January 2016; 3. "On dirait" Released: 29 August 2016; 4. "Au cœur de moi" Released: 6 February 2017

Au cœur de moi (At the core of my heart) is the second studio album and debut major label album by French-Israeli singer Amir Haddad. It was released on 29 April 2016 in France through Warner Music Group. The album includes the singles "Oasis" and "J'ai cherché", the song that represented France at the Eurovision Song Contest 2016 in Stockholm, Sweden at the Ericsson Globe. The album has peaked at number 6 on the French Albums Chart, it has also charted in Belgium and Switzerland. The album was produced by Skydancers, Tiery F, Felipe Saldivia, Fred Savio, Nyadjiko and The Bionix. A special 2-disc collector's edition of the album was released on 11 November 2016.

== Reception ==
=== Commercial performance ===
The album went straight to number 14 on the French Albums Chart on its first week of release, peaking to number 6. On 7 May 2016 the album entered the Belgium Wallonia Albums Chart at number 43, peaking at number 23 on 21 May 2016. On 8 May the album entered the Swiss Albums Chart at number 52. The album went gold within 2 months of its release, and on June 21, 2016, Amir received the award during the Fête de la Musique concert in Toulouse. As of September 2018, it has gone triple platinum in France, gold in Switzerland and gold in Belgium.

== Singles ==
"Oasis" was released as the lead single from the album on 25 June 2015, peaking to number 101 on the French Singles Chart. "J'ai cherché" was released as the second single from the album on 15 January 2016, peaking to number 2 on the French Singles Chart behind "Can't Stop the Feeling!" by Justin Timberlake. On 29 February 2016 France 2 announced that the song would be the French entry for the Eurovision Song Contest 2016. Being a member of the "Big Five", the song automatically advanced to the final which took place on 14 May 2016 at the Ericsson Globe in Stockholm, Sweden. He performed the song during the first Semi-final on 10 May 2016. The song finished in 6th place with 257 points, France's best finish since 2002 and the highest-scoring entry to date in its contest history. "On dirait" was released as the third single from the album on 29 August 2016, peaking to number 15 on the French Singles Chart. "Au cœur de moi" was released as the fourth single from the album on 6 February 2017.

== Track listing ==
Standard edition
No.	Title	Writer(s)	Producer(s)	Length
1.	"J'ai cherché"	Amir Haddad; Johan Errami; Nazim Khaled	Skydancers	3:32
2.	"On dirait"	Khaled; Jérôme Quériaud	Skydancers	3:15
3.	"Au cœur de moi"	Haddad; Khaled; Silvio Lisbonne; Manon Romiti	Tiery F	3:07
4.	"Ma vie, ma ville, mon monde"	Khaled; Quériaud	Skydancers	3:47
5.	"A ta manière"	Haddad; Khaled; Davide Esposito	Tiery F	3:21
6.	"I Know"	Haddad; Khaled; Felipe Saldivia; Fred Savio	Felipe Saldivia; Fred Savio	3:25
7.	"Très haut"	Haddad; Khaled; Lisbonne; Skalpovich; John Mamann	Nyadjiko	3:32
8.	"Je reviendrai"	Haddad; Khaled	The Bionix	3:37
9.	"Lost"	Haddad; François Welgryn; Benoit Leclerq; Julien Loris	Skydancers	3:18
10.	"Oasis"	Haddad; Nazim; Lisbonne; Manon Romiti	Skydancers	3:25
11.	"Broken Heart" (feat. ABI)	Donnie Demers; Benoit Poher	Tiery F	3:41
12.	"Il est temps qu'on m'aime"	Haddad; Khaled; Rachid Mir; Christian Dessart	The Bionix	4:14
Total length:				42:15

Edition Collector
No.	Title	Writer(s)	Producer(s)	Length
13.	"J'ai cherché" (Acoustic version)	Haddad; Errami; Khaled	Skydancers	3:56
14.	"On dirait" (Acoustic version)	Khaled; Quériaud	Skydancers	3:33
15.	"Il est temps qu'on m'aime" (Acoustic version)	Haddad; Khaled; Mir; Dessart	The Bionix	4:55
16.	"Silence" (Acoustic version)			4:12
17.	"Yo busqué"			3:30
18.	"Looking for You"	Haddad; Errami; Khaled	Skydancers	3:37
19.	"J'ai cherché" (Tom Maiz Remix)	Haddad; Errami; Khaled	Skydancers	3:28

== Chart performance ==
=== Weekly charts ===
Chart (2016–17)	Peak position
Belgian Albums (Ultratop Flanders)	136
Belgian Albums (Ultratop Wallonia)	14
French Albums (SNEP)	6
Swiss Albums (Schweizer Hitparade)	36

=== Year-end charts ===
Chart (2016)	Position
French Albums (SNEP)	25

Chart (2017)	Position
French Albums (SNEP)	49

== Certifications ==
Region	Certification	Certified units/sales
Belgium (BEA)	Gold	15,000^{‡}
France (SNEP)	3× Platinum	300,000^{‡}
^{‡} Sales+streaming figures based on certification alone.

== Release history ==
Country	Date	Label	Format
France	29 April 2016	Warner Music Group	Digital download; CD
