= Amore Eterno =

Amore Eterno is the début album of Davide Esposito released in December 2007 on Peermusic/Warner Music France. Most of the songs are in Italian, with some in French, Spanish and Russian.

Un Italien à Paris is an Italian and French cover version of Sting's Englishman in New York.

== Track listing ==
1. "Io so che tu"
2. "Un Italien à Paris"
3. "Lontani"
4. "Avere te"
5. "Nell'amore immerso"
6. "Tu ed io"
7. "Vivo solo per te"
8. "Stare senza te" (duet with the Russian singer Yelena Neva)
9. "Danza del corazón" (in Spanish, co-written by Antón García Abril)
10. "La cosa più bella del mondo"
11. "Ogni anima"
12. "Un solo destino"
13. "Que toi au monde"
14. "Amore eterno"
15. "Elle était là"
16. Bonus track: "Innamorarsi" (available on the online version of the album)

== Charts ==
Chart (2007)	Peak position
French Albums (SNEP)	72
