= Ressources =

Studio album by Amir
- Released: 16 October 2020
- Length: 62:00
- Label: Warner Music Group
- Producer: Eddy Paradelles; Silvio Lisbonne; Assaf Tzrouya; Pierre-Laurent Faure; Renaud Rebillaud; Skalpovich; Fred Savio; Clément Libes; Tiery F

Amir chronology
Addictions (2017)	Ressources (2020)	C Amir (2024)

Singles from Ressources
- 1. "La fête" Released: 10 June 2020; 2. "On verra bien" Released: 2 October 2020; 3. "Carousel" Released: 8 April 2021

Ressources is the fourth studio album and third major label album by French-Israeli singer Amir Haddad. It was released on 16 October 2020 in France by Warner Music Group. The album includes the singles "La fête" and "On verra bien".

== Singles ==
"La fête" was released as the lead single from the album on 10 June 2020. The song peaked at number 149 on the French Singles Chart. "On verra bien" was released as the second single from the album on 2 October 2020. "Carousel" was released as the third single from the album on 8 April 2021.

== Critical reception ==
Jonathan Vautrey from Wiwibloggs said, "Amir took a break from the music scene in November 2019 to write the next chapter of his life, and this has now resulted in Ressources. [...] Overall, Amir delivers a nice collection of tracks that complement each other and his vocal style well."

== Track listing ==
No.	Title	Writer(s)	Producer(s)	Length
1.	"Soi-disant"	Amir Haddad; Nazim Khaled; Silvio Lisbonne	Eddy Paradelles; Silvio Lisbonne	3:08
2.	"Toi"	Haddad; Nazim Khaled	Assaf Tzrouya; Pierre-Laurent Faure	3:37
3.	"La fête"	Haddad; Khaled	Tzrouya	3:12
4.	"Carrousel" (featuring Indila)	Haddad; Indila; Jérémy Frérot; Khaled; Renaud Rebillaud; Skalpovich	Renaud Rebillaud; Skalpovich	3:38
5.	"On verra bien"	7 Jaws; Haddad; Freddie Marche	Fred Savio	3:10
6.	"À l'envers"	Khaled	Clément Libes	3:14
7.	"Ma lumière"	Haddad; Elad Trabelsi; Khaled	Tiery F	3:44
8.	"Douce Guerrière"	Haddad; Frerot	Rebillaud	4:05
9.	"Pardonnez-moi"	Khaled	Faure; Lisbonne	3:28
10.	"Entre gifle et caresse"	Khaled	Khaled; Faure	3:10
11.	"Passer" (featuring Idan Raichel Project)	Khaled	Paradelles	3:20
12.	"Le c"	Haddad; Khaled	Libes	3:32
13.	"Daphné"	7 Jaws; Haddad; Rebillaud	Rebillaud	3:31
14.	"Paradis"	Khaled	Paradelles	3:25
15.	"Comme il faut" (featuring Céphaz)	Khaled	Paradelles; Lisbonne	2:59
16.	"Fous" (featuring 7 Jaws & Bambino)	7 Jaws; Haddad; Marche	Savio	3:15
17.	"Cet homme"	Khaled	Paradelles	3:51
18.	"A la maison"	Frerot; Khaled	Rebillaud	3:42

Ressources (Nouvelle Edition) disc 1 (original album is disc 2)
No.	Title	Length
1.	"Rétine"	3:30
2.	"Ce soir"	3:33
3.	"1+1" (Sia featuring Amir; Banx & Ranx remix)	3:16
4.	"Malgré moi"	3:05
5.	"Mec normal"	2:27
6.	"Si tu rentrais"	2:38
7.	"Oubliée"	3:14
8.	"À l'envers 1.0"	3:06

== Charts ==
=== Weekly charts ===
Chart (2020)	Peak position
Belgian Albums (Ultratop Wallonia)	8
French Albums (SNEP)	5
Swiss Albums (Schweizer Hitparade)	24

Chart performance for R3ssources
Chart (2022)	Peak position
Belgian Albums (Ultratop Wallonia)	22

=== Year-end charts ===
Chart (2020)	Position
Belgian Albums (Ultratop Wallonia)	123
French Albums (SNEP)	86

Chart (2021)	Position
Belgian Albums (Ultratop Wallonia)	106
French Albums (SNEP)	64

Chart (2023)	Position
French Albums (SNEP)	146

== Release history ==
Country	Date	Label	Format
France	16 October 2020	Warner Music Group	Digital download; CD
