= Riche (song) =

Single by Claudio Capéo

from the album Claudio Capéo
- Released: 28 February 2017
- Recorded: 2015
- Genre: Pop
- Length: 4:03
- Label: Jo & Co
- Songwriters: Manon Romiti; Silvio Lisbonne; Nazim Khaled; Mark Hekic
- Producers: Franck Authié; Nazim Khaled

Claudio Capéo singles chronology
"Ça va ça va" (2016)	"Riche" (2017)	"Dis le moi" (2017)

"Riche" is a song by French singer Claudio Capéo. The song was released as a digital download in France on 28 February 2017 by Jo & Co as the third single from his third studio album Claudio Capéo. The song was written by Manon Romiti, Silvio Lisbonne, Nazim Khaled and Mark Hekic. The song peaked at number 27 on the French Singles Chart.

== Music video ==
A video to accompany the release of "Riche" was first released onto YouTube on 1 March 2017 at a total length of four minutes and seven seconds. The video was directed by Hobo & Mojo.

== Track listing ==
Digital download
No.	Title	Length
1.	"Riche"	4:03

== Charts ==
Chart (2016–17)	Peak position
Belgium (Ultratip Bubbling Under Wallonia)	44
France (SNEP)	27

== Release history ==
Region	Date	Format	Label
France	28 February 2017	Digital download	Jo & Co
