= Un homme debout =

Single by Claudio Capéo

from the album Claudio Capéo
- Released: 5 February 2016
- Recorded: 2015
- Length: 3:26
- Label: Jo & Co
- Songwriters: Mamadou Niakaté; Ansley Ford; Jean-Pascal Anziani; Sylvain Hagopian; Ricardo Cessaut
- Producer: Doutson

Claudio Capéo singles chronology
| "Charlotte" (2011) | "Un homme debout" (2016) | "Ça va ça va" (2016) |

"Un homme debout" is a song by French singer Claudio Capéo. The song was released as a digital download in France on 5 February 2016 by Jo & Co as the lead single from his third studio album Claudio Capéo. The song was written by Mamadou Niakaté, Ansley Ford, Jean-Pascal Anziani, Sylvain Hagopian and Ricardo Cessaut. The song peaked at number 6 on the French Singles Chart.

== Music video ==
A video to accompany the release of "Un homme debout" was first released onto YouTube on 25 March 2016 at a total length of three minutes and twenty-one seconds. The video was directed by Hobo & Mojo.

== Live performances ==
- Victoires de la Musique (10 February 2017)

== Track listing ==
Digital download
| No. | Title | Length |
|---|---|---|
| 1. | "Un homme debout" | 3:26 |

== Charts ==
| Chart (2016) | Peak position |
|---|---|
| Belgium (Ultratop 50 Wallonia) | 7 |
| France (SNEP) | 6 |

== Release history ==
| Region | Date | Format | Label |
|---|---|---|---|
| France | 5 February 2016 | Digital download | Jo & Co |
