= Tant que rien ne m'arrête =

Studio album by Claudio Capéo
- Released: 7 December 2018
- Recorded: 2017–18
- Genre: Variété française
- Label: Jo & Co

Claudio Capéo chronology
Claudio Capéo (2016)	Tant que rien ne m'arrête (2018)	Penso a te (2020)

Singles from Tant que rien ne m'arrête
- 1. "Ta main" Released: 14 September 2018; 2. "Que Dieu me pardonne" Released: 15 February 2019; 3. "Plus haut" Released: 13 May 2019; 4. "Ma jolie" Released: 6 December 2019; 5. "C'est une chanson" Released: 24 April 2020

Tant que rien ne m'arrête is the fourth studio album from French singer Claudio Capéo. It was released on 7 December 2018 by Jo & Co. The album includes the singles "Que Dieu me pardonne" and "Ta main". The album has peaked at number 6 on the French Albums Chart.

== Commercial performance ==
On 14 December 2018, the album entered the French Albums Chart at number 6 in its first week of release.

== Singles ==
"Ta main" was released as the lead single from the album on 14 September 2018. "Que Dieu me pardonne" was released as the second single from the album on 15 February 2019. "Plus haut" was released as the third single from the album on 13 May 2019. "Ma jolie" was released as the fourth single from the album on 6 December 2019. "C'est une chanson" was released as the fifth single from the album on 24 April 2020.

== Track listing ==
Standard edition
No.	Title	Length
1.	"C'est une chanson"	2:55
2.	"Ta main"	3:32
3.	"Que dieu me pardonne" (with Kendji Girac)	3:31
4.	"Je fais passer"	3:27
5.	"Ma jolie"	3:55
6.	"La lumière ou la rage"	3:19
7.	"Et toi"	3:28
8.	"Je reviens"	3:56
9.	"Tant que rien ne m'arrête" (with Tom Walker)	3:27
10.	"Il y aura"	3:23
11.	"Je sais pas vous"	3:31
12.	"Plus haut"	2:58
13.	"Mourir d'armure"	3:36

== Charts ==
=== Weekly charts ===
Chart (2018)	Peak position
Belgian Albums (Ultratop Wallonia)	20
French Albums (SNEP)	6

=== Year-end charts ===
Chart (2018)	Position
French Albums (SNEP)	72

Chart (2019)	Position
Belgian Albums (Ultratop Wallonia)	89
French Albums (SNEP)	36

== Certifications ==
Region	Certification	Certified units/sales
France (SNEP)	Platinum	100,000^{‡}
^{‡} Sales+streaming figures based on certification alone.

== Release history ==
Region	Date	Format	Label
France	7 December 2018	Digital download; CD	Jo & Co
