= Les rues de ma peine =

Single by Amir

from the album Addictions
- Released: 9 February 2018
- Recorded: 2016
- Length: 3:44
- Label: Warner Music Group
- Songwriters: Amir Haddad; Nazim Khaled; Eddy Pradelles
- Producer: Eddy Pradelles

Amir singles chronology
"États d'Amour" (2017)	"Les rues de ma peine" (2018)	"Longtemps" (2018)

Music video
- "Les rues de ma peine" on YouTube

"Les rues de ma peine" is a song performed by French-Israeli singer Amir Haddad. The song was released as a digital download on 9 February 2018 as the second single from his third studio album Addictions (2017). The song has peaked at number 63 on the French Singles Chart and also charted in Belgium.

== Commercial performance ==
On 17 February 2018, the song entered the French Singles Chart at number 166, peaking at number 63.

== Music video ==
A music video to accompany the release of "Les rues de ma peine" was first released onto YouTube on 9 February 2018 at a total length of three minutes and forty-six seconds. It was filmed in Hong Kong.

== Track listing ==
Digital download
No.	Title	Length
1.	"Les rues de ma peine"	3:44

== Charts ==
=== Weekly charts ===
Chart (2018)	Peak position
Belgium (Ultratop 50 Wallonia)	9
France (SNEP)	63

=== Year-end charts ===
Chart (2018)	Position
Belgium (Ultratop Wallonia)	49

== Release history ==
Region	Date	Format	Label
France	9 February 2018	Digital download	Warner Music Group
