= Alma (French singer) =

French singer and songwriter (born 1988)

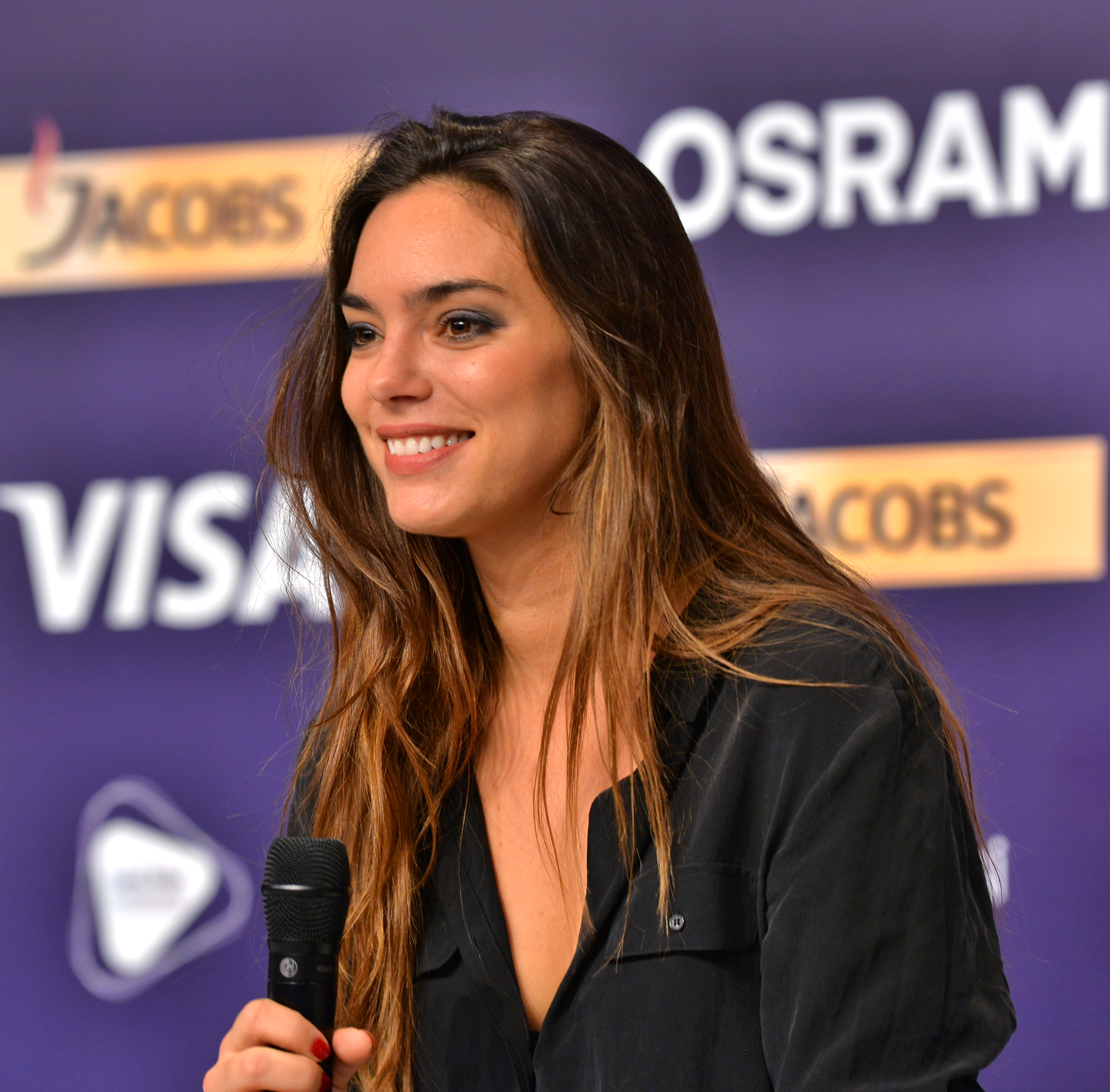
- Alma in 2017

Background information
- Born: Alexandra Maquet; 27 September 1988 (age 38); Lyon, France
- Genre: French pop
- Occupations: Singer; songwriter
- Instruments: Vocals; piano
- Years active: 2012–present
- Label: Warner Music France
- Website: alma-music.fr

Alexandra Maquet (French pronunciation: [alɛkzɑ̃dʁa makɛ], born 27 September 1988), known professionally as Alma, is a French singer and songwriter. She represented France in the Eurovision Song Contest 2017 with the song "Requiem", finishing twelfth.

== Early life ==
Alexandra Maquet (Alma) was born 27 September 1988 in Lyon as the eldest of four daughters to businessman Alain Maquet and the painter and contemporary artist Marie-Pierre Maquet, a.k.a. MPM.

Alma started singing and playing the piano during childhood. When she was 16 years old, the family moved to Miami. After spending a year at an American high school, she decided to move back to France, on her own, to study at IESEG School of Management in Lille where she obtained a master's degree in Business Administration and Management in 2011. During her studies she spent more than a year as an exchange student at FEA-USP in São Paulo, Brazil where she learned Portuguese. After her studies at IESEG, she was assistant manager at Abercrombie & Fitch in Milan during 2011, and moved thereafter to Brussels where she started to compose.

In addition to French, she speaks English, Italian, and Portuguese.

== Career ==
=== 2012–15: Early career ===
In 2012, Alma started her music career by publishing one of her first compositions, "Gone", dedicated to the memory of a close friend from her elementary school Collège de Marcq who had died in a traffic accident in 2009. The song was recorded at Studio Dada and posted on YouTube on 14 January 2012. It was followed by the release of the song "Again" on 3 February 2012 and "Elsewhere" on 19 May 2012. The songs got positive reviews in the French online magazines Bulle Sonore and La Bande Sonore.

Alma gave her first public performances on 13 May and 3 June 2012 at Rooster's Bar in Brussels accompanied by the guitarist Alain Goossens with a mix of both covers and her own compositions. Their covers of Lana del Rey's "Video Games", Tears for Fears’ "Mad World" and Nadeah's "Odile" were recorded at Avalon Studios in Brussels and posted on YouTube and her newly started official Facebook page. She started studying at ACP la Manufacture Chanson to train her singing and composing techniques and gave training concerts at Les Jeudis Chanson in autumn 2012.

Alma was discovered by Chris Corazza and Donatien Guillon at Chic Acoustic which led to a radio broadcast on 10 December 2012 as well as an interview and a one-hour concert at Le Malibv in Paris on 12 December 2012.

Alma had a concert at Le Connetable in Paris on 27 April 2013 and on 14 June 2013 she participated in the closing concert of ACP la Manufacture Chanson at restaurant Les Trois Baudets in Paris. During this time she also worked with promotion. Téléssonne broadcast a video portrait with extracts from her songs. She also started to use the artist name Alma and Vigie Discographique made a video interview and recorded four songs "Libido", "Mr Unsatisfaction", "Sitting down" and "What do you want from me" in the Pixel Room Studio, Le Pré-Saint-Gervais, that were published on YouTube. She released a cover of Julia Stone and Benjamin Biolay "Let´s Forget" with Benjamin Ollive on 29 June 2013. On 19 September 2013 she was a guest in the program Ça reste entre nous in RadioVL, giving an interview where she promoted her first major concert at the concert boat La Péniche in Lille on 27–28 September 2013.

Edoardo Grassi, who at the time worked for Carson Productions, invited her to join the weekly television show Les Chansons d'abord on France 3 hosted by Natasha St-Pier, where she participated regularly from 1 December 2013 to 15 June 2014. In her first program she performed the song "Entre nous" and got praise from Celine Dion. In December 2013 a successful crowd funding project at Kissbankers was started to record the duet "Trinquons" together with Benjamin Ollive at Studio Davout and the single was released on 26 February 2014. She met the composer and singer Nazim Khaled, on the show Les Chansons d'abord in early 2014, and they decided to start a musical collaboration. During the remaining of 2014 several songs were composed, among them the song "Requiem", which was written by Nazim Khaled in late October 2014 and first performed by Alma at the festival for emerging French performers La Créative in La Bellevilloise de Paris on 24 January 2015. In July and August 2014, Alma was an actor in Odah & Dako's online comedy video series Punchlife.

=== 2015–18: Warner Music, Eurovision Song Contest and Ma peau aime ===
On 10 April 2015, Alma signed a contract with Warner Music France. During 2015 and 2016 her collaboration with Nazim Khaled continued, leading to the single "La chute est lente", released on 10 June 2016, and the song "Ivre". An acoustic version of "Ivre" was released to Alma's official YouTube channel on 7 January 2017. Between September 2016 and February 2017, she performed as an opener to six of Amir Haddad's concerts.

In December 2016, Alma was informed by Edoardo Grassi, who had been the head of the French delegation at the Eurovision Song Contest since September 2015, that the song "Requiem" had been selected as the French entry for the Eurovision Song Contest 2017. On 9 February 2017, she was officially announced as the French representative to the Eurovision Song Contest 2017, with the song "Requiem", composed by Nazim Khaled and herself. As France is a member of the "Big Five", she automatically advanced to the final, held on 13 May 2017 in Kyiv, Ukraine where she finished 12th.

Alma's debut studio album Ma peau aime, was released on 5 May 2017, containing 13 songs. It includes the singles "La chute est lente" and "Requiem", as well as the Eurovision version of "Requiem" and the song "Ivre". The album peaked at number 33 on the French Albums Chart.

On 27 January 2018, Alma was part of the domestic jury for the final of Destination Eurovision as a substitute for her Eurovision predecessor Amir, who was unable to participate due to prior commitments. In May 2018, she was one of the commentators for France 2 at the grand final of the Eurovision Song Contest 2018 along with Stéphane Bern and fellow Destination Eurovision judge Christophe Willem.

=== 2018–present: "T'es pas un homme" and "Zumbaa" ===
On 30 November 2018, Alma released the single "T'es pas un homme". The song was her first to be self-published after leaving her record label. It describes her anger directed at a man who assaulted her on the subway in early 2018. A music video for the song was released to Alma's official YouTube channel on the same day and was directed by Jonas Bonnabeau.

On 19 July 2019, Alma released the single "Zumbaa". It features vocals from French singer Laurie Darmon. The song's music video was premiered on YouTube on the same day and was directed by Jonas Bonnabeau. On 23 April 2021, Alma released the single America on Spotify, written and recorded by herself.

== Discography ==
=== Albums ===
Title	Details	Peak chart positions	
Title	Details	FRA	BEL (Wa)
Ma peau aime	Released: 5 May 2017; Label: Warner Music Group; Format: Digital download, CD	33	79

=== Singles ===
Title	Year	Peak chart positions			Album
Title	Year	FRA	BEL (Wa) Tip	SWE Heat	Album
"Trinquons"	2014	—	—	—	Non-album single
"La chute est lente"	2016	—	—	—	Ma peau aime
"Requiem"	2017	5	29	14	Ma peau aime
"T'es pas un homme"	2018	—	—	—	Non-album single
"Zumbaa" (featuring Laurie Darmon)	2019	—	—	—	Non-album single
"America"	2021	—	—	—	Non-album single
"Don't Let Me Go Back"	2021	—	—	—	Non-album single
"Controcorrente"	2021	—	—	—	Non-album single
"Je te veux"	2022	—	—	—	Non-album single
"Tatted In My Memory" (with Tag)	2022	—	—	—	Non-album single
"Heureusement"	2023	—	—	—	Non-album single
"—" denotes a single that did not chart or was not released.

Preceded by Amir with "J'ai cherché"	France in the Eurovision Song Contest; 2017	Succeeded by Madame Monsieur with "Mercy"
