= Oasis (Amir song) =

Single by Amir

from the album Au cœur de moi
- Released: 25 June 2015
- Recorded: 2015
- Genre: Pop
- Length: 3:16
- Label: Warner Music Group
- Songwriters: Silvio Lisbonne; Nazim; Amir Haddad

Amir singles chronology
"Oasis" (2015)	"J'ai cherché" (2016)

"Oasis" is a song performed by French-Israeli singer Amir Haddad. The song was released as a digital download on 25 June 2015. The song was released as the lead single from his second studio album Au cœur de moi (2016). The song was written by Silvio Lisbonne, Nazim and Amir Haddad. The song peaked at number 101 in the French Singles Chart.

== Commercial performance ==
On 11 July 2015, the song entered the French Singles Chart at number 101 in its first week of release, the song dropped to number 116 in its second week before dropping out the charts.

== Music video ==
A music video to accompany the release of "Oasis" was first released onto YouTube on 25 June 2015, at a total length of three minutes and fifteen seconds.

== Track listing ==
Digital download
No.	Title	Length
1.	"Oasis"	3:16

== Chart performance ==
=== Weekly charts ===
Chart (2015)	Peak position
France (SNEP)	101

== Release history ==
Region	Date	Format	Label
France	25 June 2015	Digital download	Warner Music Group
