= On dirait =

Single by Amir

from the album Au cœur de moi
- Released: 29 August 2016
- Genre: Pop
- Length: 3:15
- Label: Warner Music Group
- Songwriter(s): Nazim Khaled; Jérôme Quériaud
- Producer(s): Skydancers

Amir singles chronology
"J'ai cherché" (2016)	"On dirait" (2016)	"Au cœur de moi" (2017)

"On dirait" (English: Looks like) is a song performed by French-Israeli singer Amir Haddad. The song was released as a digital download on 29 August 2016 as the third single from his second studio album Au cœur de moi (2016). The song was written by Nazim Khaled and Jérôme Quériaud. The song has peaked at number 15 on the French Singles Chart, the song also charted in Belgium. It was certified gold by SNEP in February 2017. On 17 June 2017, the song won the Chanson de l'Année prize during the Fête de la Musique event in Nîmes. Later that year, it won the NRJ Music Award for Francophone Song of the Year, Amir's second consecutive victory in that category having won the year before for "J'ai cherché".

== Commercial performance ==
On 3 September 2016, the song entered the French Singles Chart at number 178, peaking at number 15 in January 2017. On 24 September 2016, the song entered the Belgian Walloon Singles Chart at number 48, peaking at number 14 in December 2016.

== Music video ==
A music video to accompany the release of "On dirait" was first released onto YouTube on 5 September 2016 at a total length of three minutes and seventeen seconds.

== Track listing ==
Digital download
No.	Title	Length
1.	"On dirait"	3:15

== Charts ==
=== Weekly charts ===
Chart (2016–17)	Peak position
Belgium (Ultratop Wallonia)	14
France (SNEP)	15

== Certifications ==
Region	Certification	Certified units/sales
France (SNEP)	Platinum	133,333^{‡}
^{‡} Sales+streaming figures based on certification alone.

== Release history ==
Region	Date	Format	Label
France	28 July 2016	Digital download	Warner Music Group
