= Arcadian (band) =

Franco-Swiss pop band

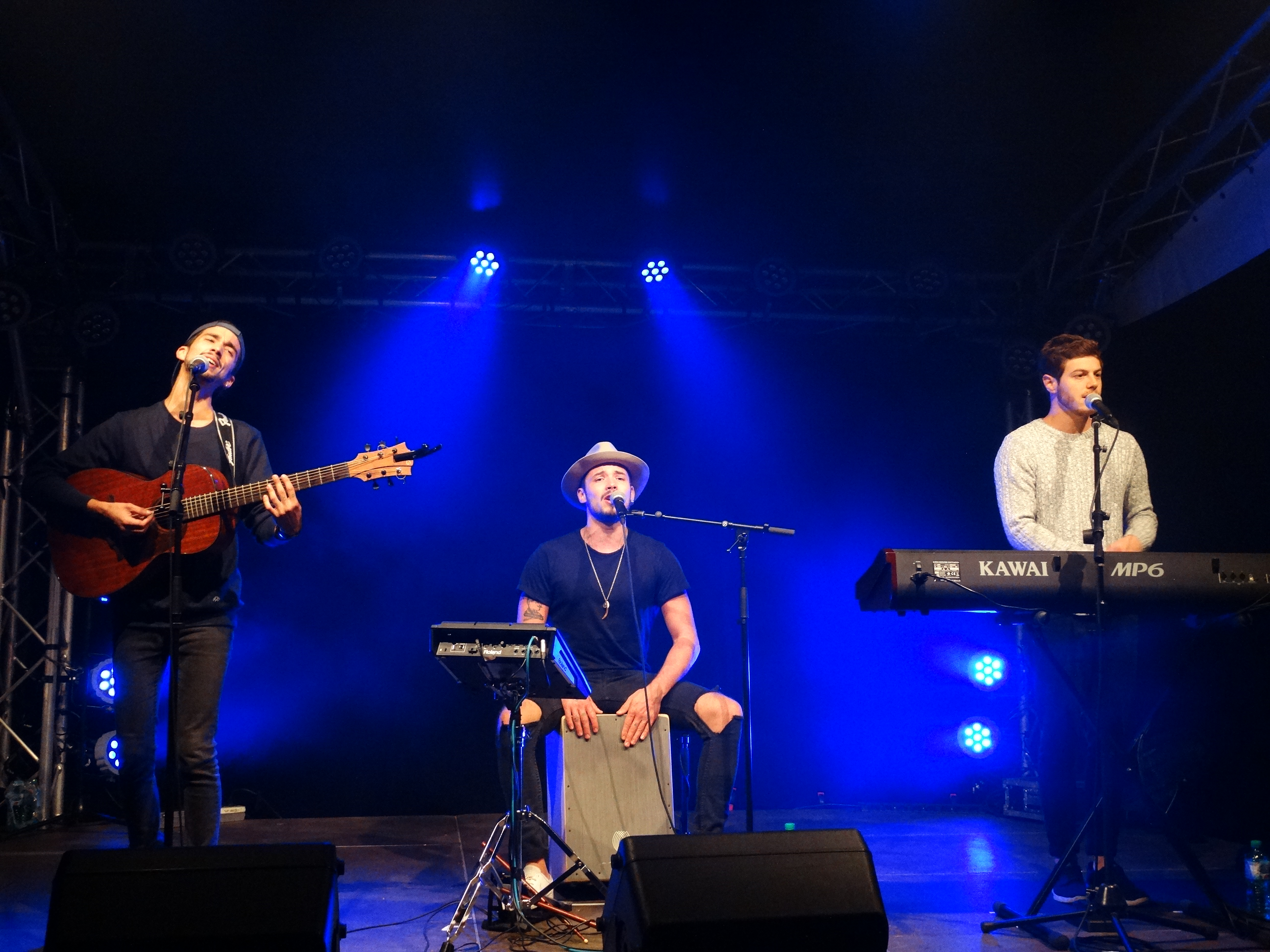
Image of Arcadian band

Arcadian was a Franco-Swiss pop band. It was active between 2015 and 2020. They released tracks on the Internet and through their participation in the fifth season of the TV talent show The Voice: La Plus Belle Voix.

Arcadian released two albums, Arcadian, released in 2017, and Marche ou rêve, released in 2019.

== History ==
=== Origins and beginnings (2015) ===
In 2015, the members of Arcadian were sharing an apartment in the 18th arrondissement of Paris, when they started working together. They played on metro line 2, in bars around the capital and often where they established their headquarters: the Social Square in Paris's 3rd arrondissement. The band included Frenchmen Yoann Pinna, Florentin Cabezon; and Swiss Jérôme Achermann.

=== Season 5 of The Voice (2016) ===
They gradually found their style, posting cover videos on YouTube. During a rehearsal for a concert, they were spotted by a TF1 team, who invited them to audition for season 5 of The Voice: La Plus Belle Voix in 2016. During the blind auditions, Florent Pagny and Mika chose them. They later confessed to loving Mika's coaching.

The group made it to the semi-finals before they were eliminated by public vote against.

=== Arcadian and touring (2016-2017) ===
The band's first EP, Folie Arcadienne, was released on July 1, 2016, digitally. Their run on The Voice enabled them to sign with Universal label Mercury France and record a self-titled debut album, released on April 14, 2017. It contained 10 compositions and one cover. The album contains "Folie Arcadienne", as well as "Ton combat". On November 3, 2017, a reissue of their debut album was released. It added 4 previously unreleased tracks.

The group performed Sinsemilia's "Tout le bonheur du monde" on Les 50 chansons préférées des français. Following the release of their debut album, Arcadian toured France, Luxembourg, Switzerland and Belgium.

=== Marche ou rêve and separation (2018-2020) ===
Their second album, Marche ou rêve, was released on October 4, 2019. The first concert of the #MarcheOuRêve tour took place in Conflans-Sainte-Honorine on September 28, 2019, one week before the album's release. They scheduled for 25 dates in France, Belgium, Switzerland and Luxembourg. The final dates were canceled due to the Covid-19 lockdown.

On November 25, 2020, Arcadian announced their split on Instagram and YouTube, explaining that they had "reached the end of what [they] could do, what [they] wanted to do".
