= Requiem (Alma song) =

2017 single by Alma

Single by Alma

from the album Ma peau aime
- Released: 13 January 2017
- Genre: French pop
- Length: 3:03
- Label: Warner Music France
- Songwriter: Nazim Khaled
- Producer: Nazim Khaled

Alma singles chronology
"La chute est lente" (2016)	"Requiem" (2017)	"T'es pas un homme" (2018)

Music video
- "Requiem" on YouTube

Eurovision Song Contest 2017 entry
- Country: France
- Artist: Alma
- Languages: French; English
- Composer: Nazim Khaled
- Lyricist: Nazim Khaled

Finals performance
- Final result: 12th
- Final points: 135

Entry chronology
- ◄ "J'ai cherché" (2016)
- "Mercy" (2018) ►

"Requiem" is a song performed by French singer Alma. The song was released as a digital download on 13 January 2017 through Warner Music France as the second single from her debut studio album Ma peau aime, and was written by Nazim Khaled. It represented France in the Eurovision Song Contest 2017. The Eurovision version of the song was revealed on 11 March 2017.

== Eurovision Song Contest ==
On 9 February 2017, Alma was announced as the French representative to the Eurovision Song Contest 2017, with the song "Requiem". As France is a member of the "Big Five", she automatically advanced to the final, held on 13 May 2017 in Kyiv, Ukraine.

It was discovered during the week of 17 February 2017 that the artist's song had been recorded and performed prior to the EBU's submission deadline, 1 September 2016, which therefore violated the EBU's song submission policy. Further research shows that Alma's song was performed at the end of January 2015. While the French broadcaster had claimed they were not in breach of the EBU's submission rules, there had been no ultimate decision regarding the disqualification of France 2 from the contest up until then. It was reported on 21 February 2017 that Alma and her crew were in the production of a bilingual version of her song—the two languages being French and English—which implies that the act has ultimately not been disqualified from the contest.

== Track listing ==
Digital download
No.	Title	Length
1.	"Requiem"	3:03

Other Versions

- 7th Heaven Remix

== Charts ==
Chart (2017)	Peak position
Belgium (Ultratip Bubbling Under Wallonia)	29
France (SNEP)	5
Sweden Heatseeker (Sverigetopplistan)	14

== Release history ==
Region	Date	Format	Label
Worldwide	13 January 2017	Digital download	Warner Music France
