= Claudio Capéo =

French singer and musician

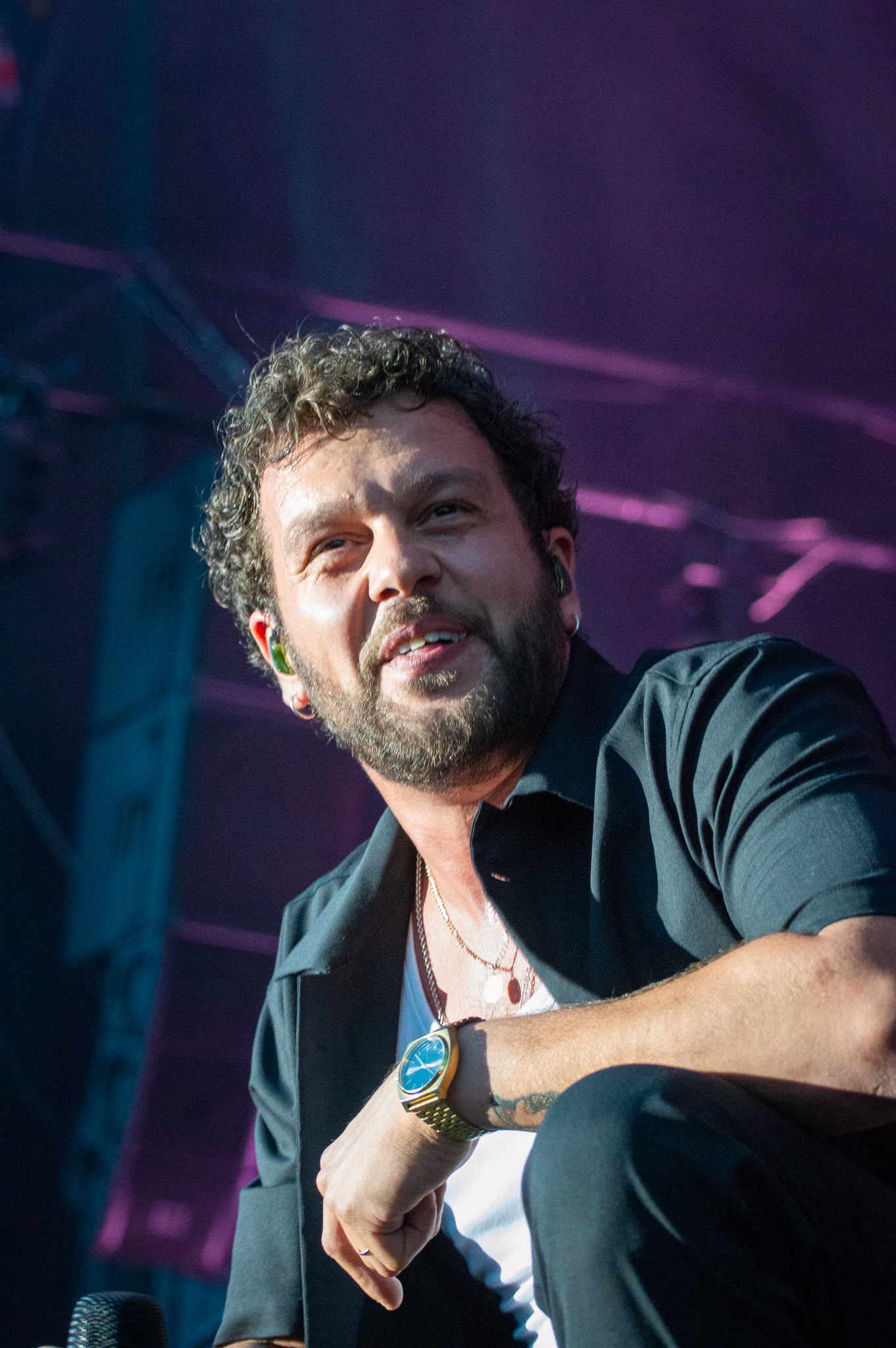
- Capéo in 2023

Background information
- Born: Claudio Ruccolo; 10 January 1985 (age 41); Mulhouse, Alsace, France
- Genres: French chanson
- Occupations: Singer; musician (accordionist)
- Instruments: Voice, chromatic button accordion, 'piano
- Years active: 2009–present
- Labels: Jo & Co
- Website: claudio-capeo.com

Claudio Ruccolo (Italian pronunciation: [ˈklaudjo ˈrukkolo]; born 10 January 1985), better known as Claudio Capéo (French: [klodjo kapeo]), is a French singer and accordion player of Italian descent. He grew up in Cernay, Alsace.

== Career ==
=== Early beginnings ===
He learned to play the accordion at the young age of six and took part in musical competitions. At age 16, he was part of a metal band and later in an African jazz band. Continuing his education, he passed the Brevet d'études professionnelles (BEP) and Certificat d'aptitude professionnelle (CAP) and worked as a carpenter and decorator for 71

=== 2010–2015: El Vagabond, Miss Mondo and Mr Jack ===
But never leaving his passion for music, he formed with friends the Campéo band releasing two self-published music albums: El Vagabond (2010) and Miss Mondo (2012) promoting them in live performances in France and neighbouring countries. In 2015 he released the EP Mr Jack.

=== 2016–present: The Voice and Claudio Capéo ===
In 2016, he took part in season 5 of the French talent competition The Voice: la plus belle voix. In the blind auditions, he sang "Chez Laurette" from Michel Delpech with only Florent Pagny turning his chair. As part of Team Pagny, on 26 March 2016, he performed "Mathilde" from Jacques Brel in a battle against teammate Laurent-Pierre Lecordier and was eliminated. Despite his early exit from the show, Capéo has proven very popular with the French public. Just after the show, he was contacted by Sébastien Saussez, director of the French record label Jo&Co and in 2016 released the self-titled debut album Claudio Capéo that topped the SNEP French Albums chart in its first week of release staying at number 1 for five consecutive weeks. The album was certified three times platinum with sales of 300,000 copies by the beginning of 2017. His debut single "Un homme debout" made it to number 6 on the French Singles Chart also charting in Belgium.

== Discography ==
=== Albums ===
| Title | Details | Peak chart positions | | | Certifications |
| Title | Details | FRA | BEL (Wa) | SWI | Certifications |
|---|---|---|---|---|---|
| El Vagabond | Released: 27 February 2010; Label: Claudio Capéo; Format: Digital download, CD | — | — | — | |
| Miss Mondo | Released: 13 October 2012; Label: Khamai; Format: Digital download, CD | — | — | — | |
| Claudio Capéo | Released: 15 July 2016; Label: Jo & Co; Format: Digital download, CD | 1 | 9 | 24 | SNEP: Diamond |
| Tant que rien ne m'arrête | Released: 7 December 2018; Label: Jo & Co; Format: Digital download, CD | 6 | 20 | — | SNEP: 2×Platinum |
| Penso a te | Released: 4 December 2020; Label: Jo & Co; Format: Digital download, CD | 3 | 18 | 27 | SNEP: Platinum |
| Rose des vents | Released: 25 November 2022; Label: Jo & Co; Format: Digital download, CD | 3 | 29 | 30 | |
| Nouveau souffle | Released: 28 November 2025; Label: Jo & Co; Format: Digital download, CD | — | 15 | 33 | |
"—" denotes a recording that did not chart or was not released in that territory.

=== Extended plays ===
| Title | Details |
|---|---|
| Mr. Jack | Released: 25 August 2015; Label: Claudio Capéo; Format: Digital download, CD |

=== Singles ===
| Year | Title | Peak chart positions | | Album |
| Year | Title | FRA | BEL (Wa) | Album |
|---|---|---|---|---|
| 2011 | "Charlotte" | — | — | Miss Mondo |
| 2016 | "Un homme debout" | 6 | 7 | Claudio Capéo |
| 2016 | "Ça va ça va" | 23 | 9 | Claudio Capéo |
| 2017 | "Riche" | 27 | — (Note: "Riche" did not chart on the Walloon Ultratop chart, but peaked at number 44 on the Ultratip chart, which acts as an extension to the Ultratop 50.) | Claudio Capéo |
| 2017 | "Dis le moi" | 191 | — (Note: "Dis le moi" did not chart on the Walloon Ultratop chart, but peaked at number 3 on the Ultratip chart, which acts as an extension to the Ultratop 50.) | Claudio Capéo |
| 2018 | "Ta main" | — | — (Note: "Ta main" did not chart on the Walloon Ultratop chart, but peaked at number 4 on the Ultratip chart, which acts as an extension to the Ultratop 50.) | Tant que rien ne m'arrête |
| 2018 | "Que Dieu me pardonne" (Note: "Que Dieu me pardonne" also features on Kendji Girac's third studio album Amigo.) (with Kendji Girac) | 133 | 31 | Tant que rien ne m'arrête |
| 2019 | "Plus haut" | — | — | Tant que rien ne m'arrête |
| 2019 | "Ma jolie" | — | — | Tant que rien ne m'arrête |
| 2020 | "C'est une chanson" | — | — | Tant que rien ne m'arrête |
| 2020 | "E penso a te" | — | — | Penso a te |
| 2021 | "Senza una donna" (with Davide Esposito) | — | — | Penso a te |
"—" denotes a recording that did not chart or was not released in that territory.
