= J'ai cherché =

2016 song by Amir Haddad

Single by Amir Haddad

from the album Au cœur de moi
- Released: 15 January 2016
- Recorded: 2015
- Genre: Pop; Europop
- Length: 3:32 (album version); 3:00 (eurovision edit)
- Label: Sash Productions
- Songwriter(s): Amir Haddad; Johan Errami; Nazim Khaled
- Producer(s): Nazim Khaled; Silvio Lisbonne; Skydancers

Amir Haddad singles chronology
"Oasis" (2015)	"J'ai cherché" (2016)	"On dirait" (2016)

Music video
- "J'ai cherché" on YouTube

Eurovision Song Contest 2016 entry
- Country: France
- Artist(s): Amir
- Languages: French; English
- Composer(s): Nazim Khaled; Silvio Lisbonne; Skydancers
- Lyricist(s): Amir Haddad; Johan Errami; Nazim Khaled

Finals performance
- Final result: 6th
- Final points: 257

Entry chronology
- ◄ "N'oubliez pas" (2015)
- "Requiem" (2017) ►

"J'ai cherché" (French pronunciation: [ʒɛ ʃɛʁʃe], English: I searched) is a song performed by French-Israeli singer Amir Haddad. The song represented France in the Eurovision Song Contest 2016 in Stockholm, Sweden. The song finished 6th overall in the grand final, with 257 points, finishing 3rd with the juries and 9th in the televote, France's best result since 2002. It was written by Haddad along with Johan Errami and Nazim Khaled, while Khaled produced the track along with Silvio Lisbonne and Skydancers. The song was released as a digital download on 15 January 2016 through Sash Productions. The song was released as the second single from his second studio album Au cœur de moi (2016).

== Eurovision Song Contest ==
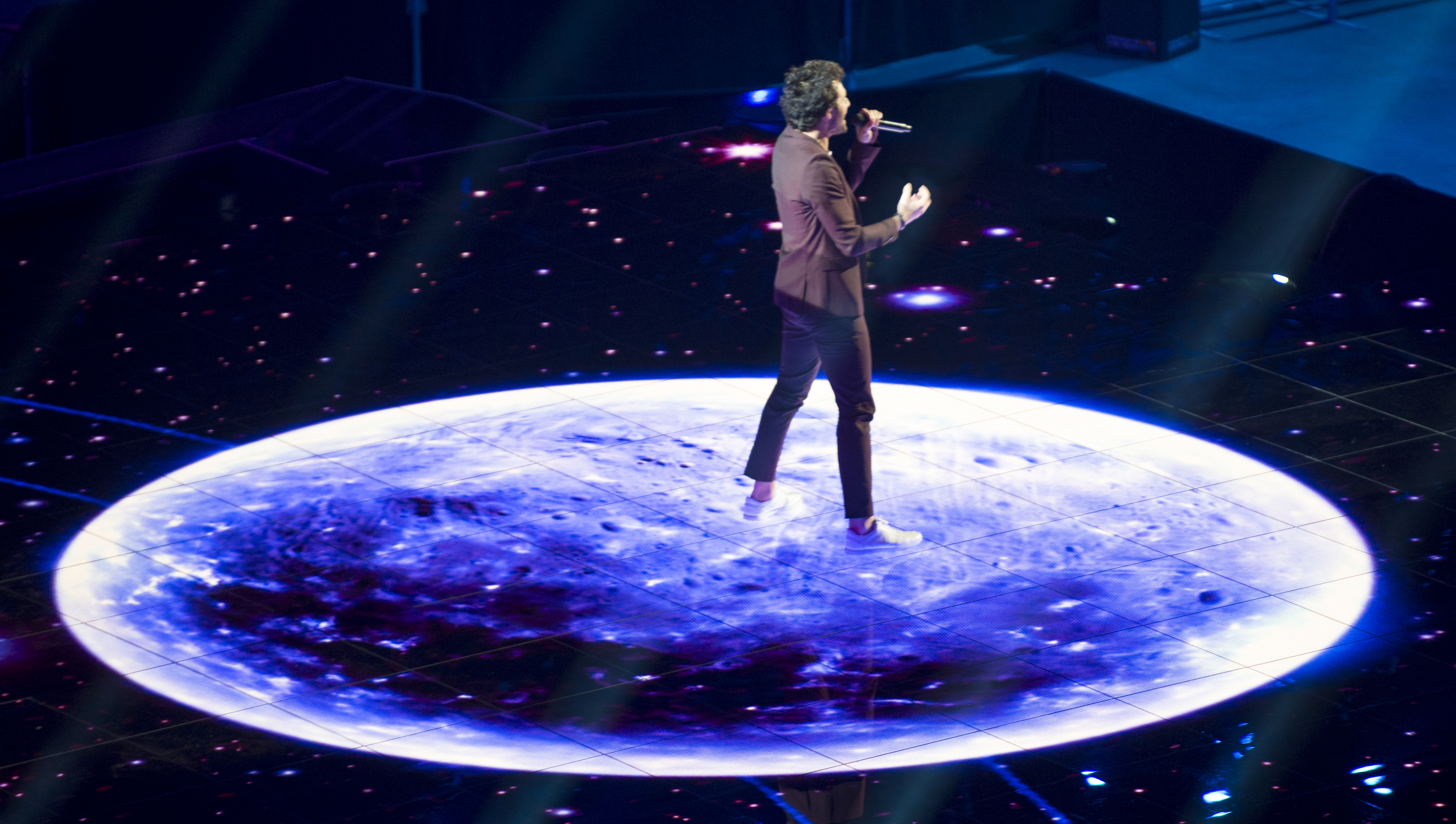
Amir performing at Eurovision 2016

On 29 February 2016, the French broadcaster announced that Haddad would perform the song "J'ai cherché" as the country's Eurovision Song Contest 2016 entry. Being a member of the "Big Five", he automatically advanced to the final. He performed the song during the first semi-final on 10 May 2016. The song finished 6th overall in the grand final, with 257 points, finishing 3rd with the juries and 9th in the televote, France's best result since 2002.

== Music video ==
A music video to accompany the release of "J'ai cherché" was first released onto Amir's YouTube channel on 3 March 2016 at a total length of three minutes and thirty-two seconds. An abridged version of the video was uploaded to the Eurovision Song Contest's YouTube channel on 13 March 2016 with an alternate lyrics and a total length of 2:59 minutes. It has since received over 18 million views and is one of the most positively received among all of the 2016 participants, and his first version of the song has received over 100 million views on his own channel on YouTube.

== Reception ==
Since its release to French radio in January 2016, the song has received largely positive feedback from the public. The song reached number two on the French Singles Chart, on 20 May 2016, behind "Can't Stop the Feeling!" by Justin Timberlake. Many of these fans were pleased when it was chosen to represent France at Eurovision, leading much of the media covering the contest to believe that this was the first French contest entry in recent memory to be positively backed by its own public. The song has been listened to on radio over 1.2 billion times, earning Amir the first W9 Gold Award on 11 December 2016 for the most listened-to French song on radio.

The single was certified platinum in France in October 2016. In August 2022, it was certified Diamond.

== Other versions ==
After the good reception of the song, two different versions of J'ai cherché were released, one in English and one in Spanish. One month after the release of "J'ai cherché", Haddad released the all-English version of the song, titled "Looking for You". On 10 May 2016, in the morning of the very first Semi-final the Spanish version of the song was uploaded to his YouTube channel, titled "Yo Busqué". This last version was made with the help of the Spanish representative of Eurovision that year (2016), Barei, after they both formed a strong friendship in the Eurovision Tour around Europe, where they sang the early version of the song together in the streets of London. Both the English and Spanish versions of the song were released on the special edition of Amir's album Au cœur de moi on November 11

== Track listing ==
Digital download
No.	Title	Length
1.	"J'ai cherché"	3:32

== Chart performance ==
=== Weekly charts ===
Chart (2016)	Peak position
Austria (Ö3 Austria Top 40)	58
Belgium (Ultratip Flanders)	5
Belgium (Ultratop Wallonia)	4
France (SNEP)	2
Germany (GfK)	80
Lithuania (M-1Top 40)	1
Netherlands (Single Top 100)	107
Russia Airplay (Tophit)	26
Spain (PROMUSICAE)	33
Sweden (Sverigetopplistan)	45
Switzerland (Schweizer Hitparade)	59

=== Year-end charts ===
Chart (2016)	Position
Belgium (Ultratop Wallonia)	10

== Certifications ==
Region	Certification	Certified units/sales
France (SNEP)	Diamond	333,333^{‡}
^{‡} Sales+streaming figures based on certification alone.

== Release history ==
Region	Date	Format	Label
Worldwide	15 January 2016	Digital download	Sash Productions

=== Awards and nominations ===
Year	Award	Category	Result
2016	NRJ Music Awards	Francophone Song of the Year	Won
