= Nazim Khaled =

French singer-songwriter (born 1986)

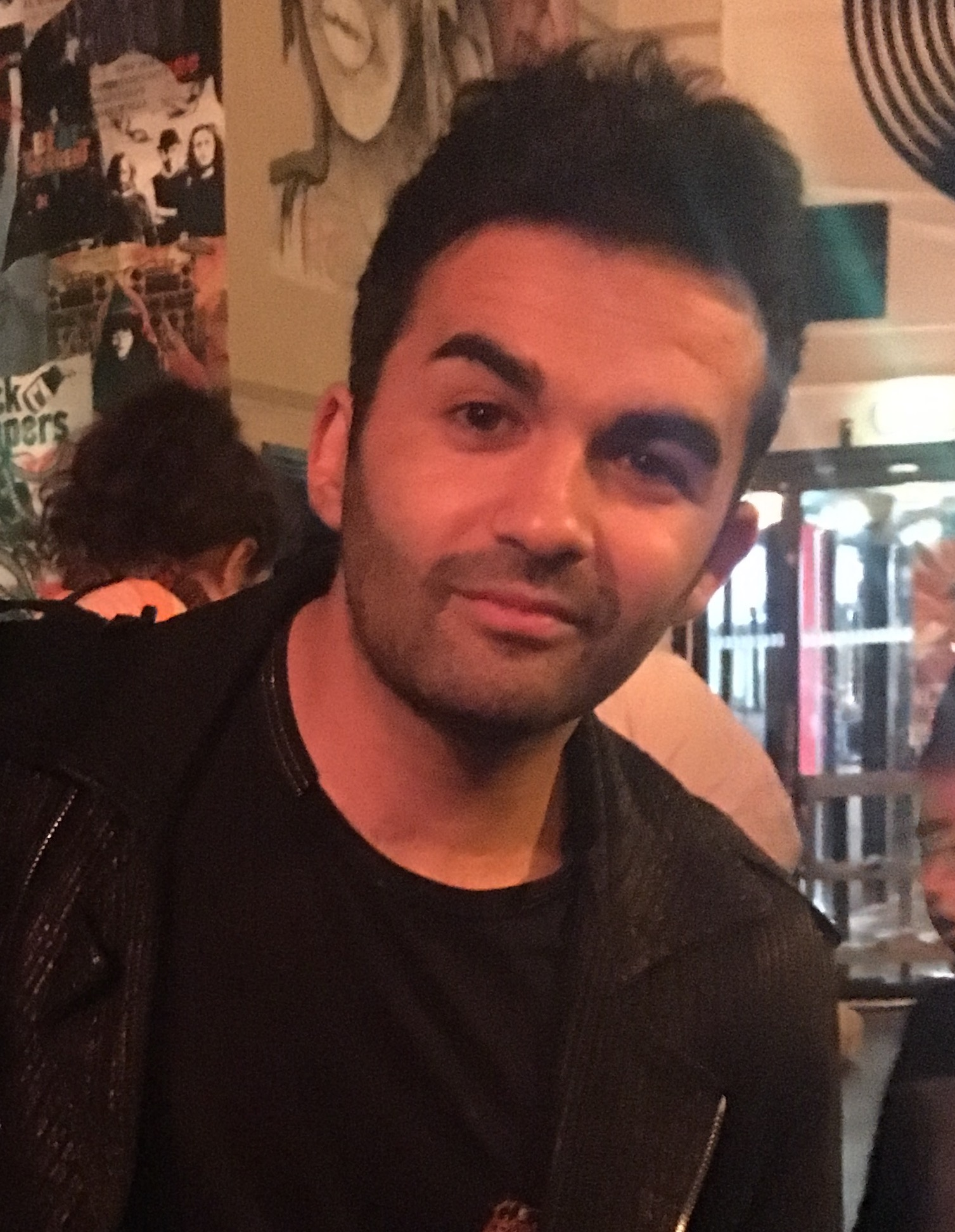
- Khaled in 2017

Background information
- Born: 3 September 1986 (age 39); Marseille, France
- Genres: Pop, R&B, Electropop
- Occupation: Singer-songwriter
- Instrument: Guitar
- Years active: Since 2002
- Labels: Bukowski, Polydor

Nazim Khaled (born 3 September 1986) is a French singer-songwriter. He has written several successes for different artists like Kendji Girac, Amir, Claudio Capéo, Kemmler and Alma.

== Biography ==
Khaled was born in Marseille and studied at the Conservatoire de Saint-Étienne. In 2011, he participated in the TV program Je veux signer chez AZ under the pseudonym Nazim Hitch. Though he did not win the title, he was noticed by the record label Mercury who offered him a contract. He is the opening act for Ben l'Oncle Soul, Goran Bregović and Cali.

Khaled wrote ten songs on the album Au cœur de moi by the singer Amir Haddad, of which he co-wrote and composed "J'ai cherché", which was also chosen to represent France at the Eurovision Song Contest 2016. He opened for the singer during his tour in 2016 and 2017. Alma represented France at the Eurovision Song Contest 2017 with the song "Requiem", which was written and composed by Nazim Khaled.

Khaled has written for several other artists, such as Yannick Noah, Priscilla Betti, Chimène Badi, Claudio Capéo, Florent Pagny and Kendji Girac, notably "Andalouse" and "Les yeux de la mama".

After having authored several songs for other artists, he decided to begin writing for himself as well. His first single, "Pourquoi veux-tu que je danse?" was released on 9 June 2017, This song with an "Oriental chorus" is considered by some journalists as a committed song, which recalls the musical universe of Stromae, says Ninon Quillot who writes for Charts in France website on charting songs. It was produced by Skalpovich and was the first single from Nazim's upcoming debut album, scheduled for late 2017 by Universal Music France. He also wrote "La beauté du doute" for Florent Pagny. A single "Sommet", that he co-wrote with Amir and Kemmler was selected to be an official theme of the 2024 Summer Olympics on French TV. According to Guinnes World Records, The most consecutive days to release a digital single by a music act are 366 and was achieved by Nazim Khaled (France) in Paris, Ile de France, France, on 1 January 2024 to 31 December 2024. Nazim not only released, he also wrote and produced all singles day by day throughout the year.

== Discography ==
=== Singles ===
- 2012: "Les cités"
- 2013: "Douce France"
- 2017: "Pourquoi veux-tu que je danse"
- 2018: "Je suis une femme seule"
- 2018: "On refera le monde"

=== Main compositions ===
- 2014: Kendji Girac in "Andalouse"
- 2015: Kendji Girac in "Les yeux de la mama"
- 2015: Kendji Girac in "Conmigo"
- 2016: Amir Haddad in "J'ai cherché"
- 2016: Amir Haddad in "On dirait"
- 2016: Claudio Capéo in "Ça va ça va"
- 2017: Amir Haddad in "Les rues de ma peine"
- 2017: Amir Haddad in "Au cœur de moi"
- 2017: Claudio Capéo in "Riche"
- 2017: Alma in "Requiem"
- 2017: Priscilla Betti in "La vie sait"
- 2017: Florent Pagny in "La beauté du doute"
- 2017: Amir Haddad in "États d'Amour"
- 2018: Amir Haddad in "Longtemps"
- 2019: Claudio Capéo in "Beaux à voir"
- 2019: Amir Haddad in "5 minutes avec toi"
