= No Vacancy (OneRepublic song) =

2017 single by OneRepublic

Single by OneRepublic
- Released: April 28, 2017
- Recorded: January 2017
- Genre: Tropical pop
- Length: 3:43
- Label: Interscope; Mosley
- Songwriters: Ryan Tedder; Tor Erik Hermansen; Mikkel Storleer Eriksen; Brent Kutzle; Drew Brown; Zach Filkins
- Producers: Ryan Tedder; Stargate

OneRepublic singles chronology
| "Let's Hurt Tonight" (2016) | "No Vacancy" (2017) | "Rich Love" (2017) |

"No Vacancy" is a song by American pop rock band OneRepublic. It was released as a single via digital download on April 28, 2017. It was written by band members Ryan Tedder, Brent Kutzle, Drew Brown, and Zach Filkins, as well as Tor Erik Hermansen and Mikkel Storleer Eriksen from the Norwegian production and songwriting duo Stargate. The song was co-produced by Stargate and Tedder.

== Background ==
After the release of OneRepublic's fourth full-length studio album, Oh My My (2016), the band halted all plans for touring and promoting the album following its release. Ryan Tedder described in a lengthy post on the band's official Facebook page that they suffered from "crippling anxiety" due to the band's constant touring, recording, and promoting methods. Tedder revealed that the band was to begin releasing a new song "monthly, weekly sometimes", departing from their typical album cycle process. He went on to describe the band's future releases by stating “the songs” will be varied and with collaborations, and may feel bonkers at first. Some will be remixes, others will be just me on piano or guitar. Some will sound super trendy and new, some will sound classic and old school or very OneRepublic." In the same post, Tedder confirmed that the band was to release "new music scheduled 2 weeks" after "No Vacancy". The song is the first of a string of singles to be released by OneRepublic. This song was originally intended for Selena Gomez.

As of March 20, 2022, the song's lyric video has reached over 37 million views.

== Composition ==
"No Vacancy" is a reggae-inspired tropical pop song. It features falsetto vocals from lead vocalist and songwriter Ryan Tedder, ska-inspired guitars, and heavy use of synthesizers. It was written by Tedder, Brent Kutzle, Drew Brown, Zach Filkins, as well as Tor Erik Hermansen and Mikkel Storleer Eriksen from the Norwegian production and songwriting duo Stargate. The song was co-produced by Tedder and Stargate and recorded during a string of sessions in January 2017.

== Track listing ==
Digital download
| No. | Title | Length |
|---|---|---|
| 1. | "No Vacancy" | 3:43 |

== Credits and personnel ==
OneRepublic

- Ryan Tedder – lead vocals, guitar, piano, keyboards, bass, drums, percussion, songwriting, production
- Zach Filkins – guitar, viola, drums, percussion, backing vocals, songwriting
- Drew Brown – guitar, piano, keyboards, bass, drums, percussion, backing vocals, songwriting
- Eddie Fisher – drums, percussion
- Brent Kutzle – bass, guitar, piano, keyboards, backing vocals, percussion, songwriting, production

Additional personnel

- Stargate – production, songwriting

== Charts ==
=== Weekly charts ===
| Chart (2017) | Peak position |
|---|---|
| Austria (Ö3 Austria Top 40) | 61 |
| Belgium (Ultratip Bubbling Under Flanders) | 20 |
| Belgium (Ultratop 50 Wallonia) | 33 |
| Bulgaria (PROPHON) | 8 |
| Canada Hot 100 (Billboard) | 74 |
| Canada AC (Billboard) | 34 |
| Czech Republic Airplay (ČNS IFPI) | 24 |
| Czech Republic Singles Digital (ČNS IFPI) | 27 |
| France (SNEP) | 108 |
| Germany (GfK) | 52 |
| Hungary (Stream Top 40) | 35 |
| Ireland (IRMA) | 74 |
| Italy (FIMI) | 11 |
| Latvia (Latvijas Top 40) | 9 |
| Netherlands (Single Top 100) | 82 |
| Portugal (AFP) | 53 |
| Scottish Singles Sales (Official Charts) | 40 |
| Slovakia Airplay (ČNS IFPI) | 55 |
| Slovakia Singles Digital (ČNS IFPI) | 32 |
| Spain (PROMUSICAE) | 70 |
| Sweden (Sverigetopplistan) | 52 |
| Switzerland (Schweizer Hitparade) | 34 |
| US Bubbling Under Hot 100 (Billboard) | 13 |

=== Year-end charts ===
| Chart (2017) | Position |
|---|---|
| Italy (FIMI) | 38 |
| Latvia Airplay (LaIPA) | 88 |

== Certifications ==
| Region | Certification | Certified units/sales |
|---|---|---|
| Brazil (Pro-Música Brasil) | Gold | 30,000^{‡} |
| Germany (BVMI) | Gold | 200,000^{‡} |
| Italy (FIMI) | 3× Platinum | 150,000^{‡} |
| Spain (Promusicae) | Gold | 20,000^{‡} |
| Sweden (GLF) | Gold | 20,000^{‡} |
^{‡} Sales+streaming figures based on certification alone.

== Release history ==
| Region | Date | Format | Format | Label |
|---|---|---|---|---|
| Worldwide | 28 April 2017 | Digital download | Audio streaming | Mosley Music Group; Interscope Records |
