= Amir Haddad =

French-Israeli singer-songwriter (born 1984)

Amir Haddad עמיר חדד
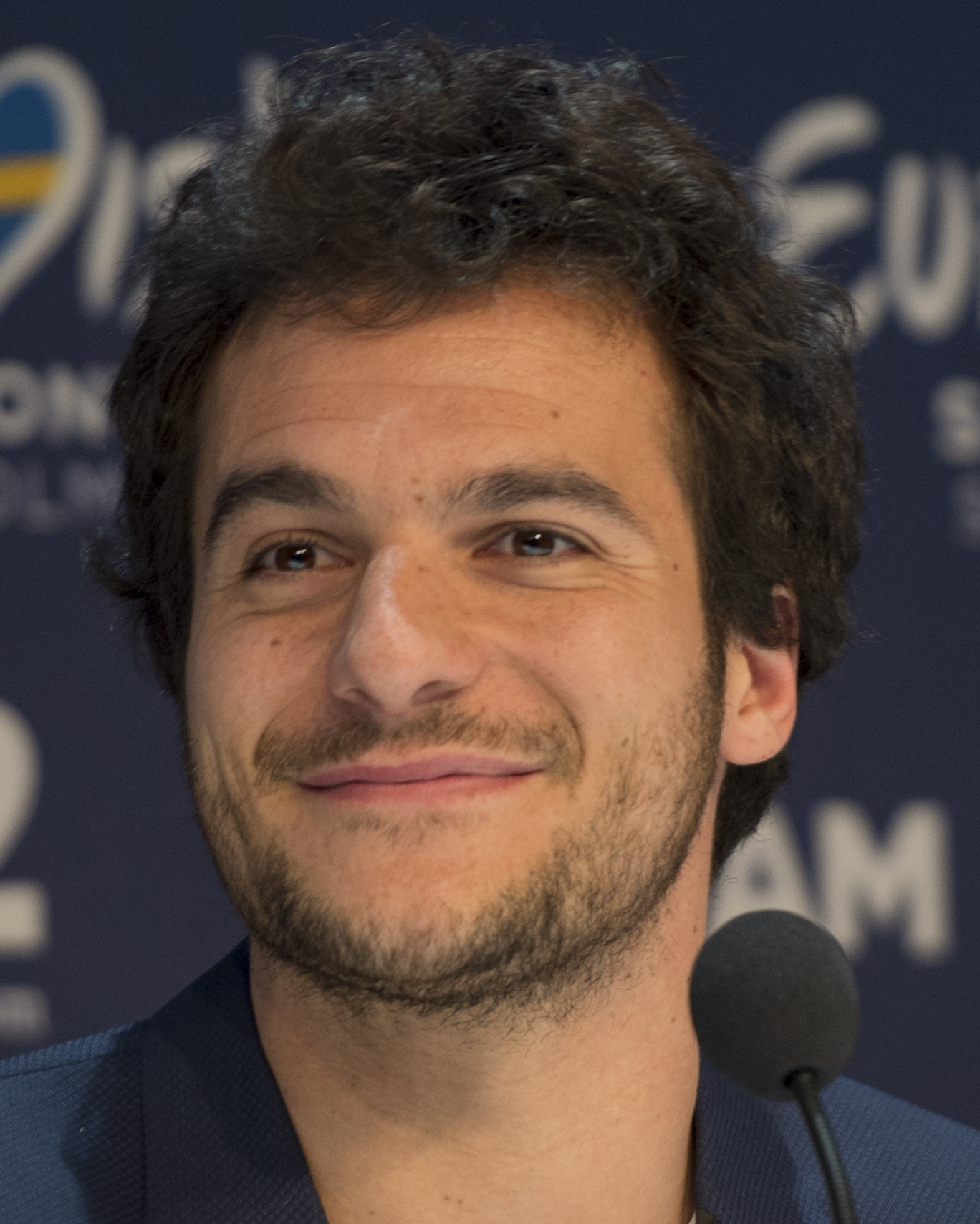
- Haddad in 2016

Background information
- Also known as: Amir, אמיר
- Born: Laurent Amir Khlifa Khedider Haddad; 20 June 1984 (age 42); Paris, France
- Genre: Pop
- Occupations: Singer; songwriter; actor
- Years active: 2006–present
- Label: Warner Music France
- Website: amirofficiel.com

Laurent Amir Khalifa Khedider Haddad (Hebrew: לורן עמיר חליפה חדידר חדד; born 20 June 1984), better known as Amir Haddad (Hebrew: עמיר חדד) or simply as Amir, is a French-Israeli singer-songwriter and actor. He took part in 2006 in the Israeli music competition Kokhav Nolad, released his album Vayehi in 2011 and was a finalist in French competition The Voice: la plus belle voix as part of Team Jenifer finishing third in the competition. He represented France in the Eurovision Song Contest 2016 with the song "J'ai cherché", which finished in sixth place.

== Early life ==
Haddad was born in Paris to Maghrebi Jewish parents from Tunisia and Morocco. He grew up in Sarcelles (Val-d'Oise) and immigrated to Israel in 1992 at the age of eight as part of Aliyah; the family settled in Herzliya, north of Tel Aviv. He sang as a young child in the synagogue and in various social events.

Amir was born deaf in his right ear.

== Career ==
=== 2006–2013: Kokhav Nolad and Vayehi ===
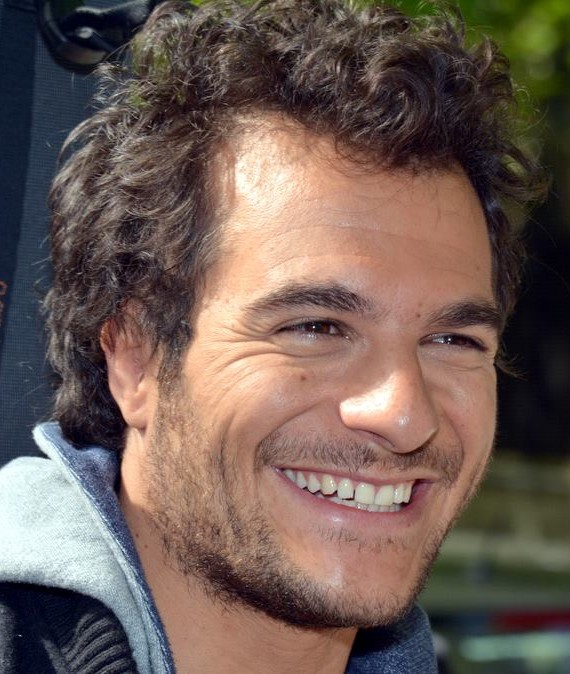
Amir in 2016

He came to fame in 2006 with his participation in the fourth season of the Israeli song competition Kokhav Nolad (Hebrew: כוכב נולד; A Star is Born), the Israeli equivalent of the Pop Idol held May to September 2006. He was the first candidate to sing mostly French language songs during the audition. He advanced for 4 stages before being eliminated.

The series was won by Jacko Eisenberg. Not winning in the season, he finished his obligatory military service in the Israeli Defence Forces and continued his studies in dentistry in Hebrew University of Jerusalem graduating in 2012. His song "Kache limtso milim", the Hebrew version of Patrick Bruel's French hit "J'te l'dis quand même", came alongside a music video. Bruel loved Amir's rendition so much he invited him to sing it with him in a grand event in Ra'anana Park on 23 May 2008 in front of 8000 spectators. He sang it yet again much later in 2013, during the gala in tribute of Anaelle Ledoroth in Paris on 27 May 2013.

In 2011, Amir Haddad released his debut studio album Vayehi co-written by himself and Omri Dagan during the years when Amir was a university student. The album included his already popular version of "Kache limtso milim". He also revived a 1990s hit "Désenchantée" by French artist Mylène Farmer. Haddad's version was produced by the famous Israeli producer Offer Nissim. Meanwhile, he pursued his passion in music.

At the end of the competition, Haddad was signed to a French label, creating a following in France, Switzerland, the United States and Brazil in addition to Israel. He cooperated with a number of artists, notably Shlomi Shabat, Haim Moshe, Dudu Aharon, Gad Elbaz and Eyal Golan.

=== 2014–2015: The Voice: la plus belle voix ===
In 2014, he took part in season 3 of the French television series The Voice: la plus belle voix broadcast on TF1 from 11 January 2014 to 10 May 2014. In the blind auditions, Haddad sang "Candle in the Wind" from Elton John with all four coaches, Garou, Mika, Jenifer and Florent Pagny turning their chairs. Haddad chose to be part of Team Jenifer. He made it to the Final where he finished third.

==== Performances ====
Performed	Song	Original artist	Result
Blind audition	"Candle in the Wind"	Elton John	Joined Team Jenifer
Musical battle	"Radioactive"(against François Lachance)	Imagine Dragons	Won Battle
L'épreuve ultime 1	"Né en 17 à Leidenstadt	Fredericks Goldman Jones	Saved by coach
Live 1	"Counting Stars"	OneRepublic	Saved by the public vote
Live 3	"Lucie"	Pascal Obispo	Saved by the public vote
Live 4	"Just the Way You Are"	Bruno Mars	Saved by the public vote
Semi-final	"Comme un fils"	Corneille	Qualified for the final (Note: Qualified for the final with joint coach/public vote 79.9/150 against team member Manon Trinquier.)
Final	"All of Me"	John Legend	Third (Note: Finished third with 18% of public vote. Winner for the season Kendji Girac with 51% of votes.)
Final	"La voix des sages" (duet with original singer Noah)	Yannick Noah	Third
Final	"Si seulement je pouvais lui manquer" (duet with coach Jenifer)	Calogero	Third

Amir toured France with other The Voice finalists. He also appeared in compilation album Forever Gentleman 2, in the concert by charity association Leurs voix pour l'espoir in Olympia, Paris, appeared in the #OBJETPUBLIC calendar of the magazine Public and many other appearances. He also released a music video for "Candle in the Wind", a song he had interpreted during the blind auditions in The Voice. He is preparing a first album in French. In 2015, he released the hit single "Oasis" under the mononym Amir, charting in SNEP, the French Singles Chart.

On Saturday, 24 February 2018, Anto, Amir's cousin, participated in the blind auditions of season 7 of The Voice on TF1 and joined Zazie's team.

=== 2016–2017: Eurovision Song Contest and Au cœur de moi ===
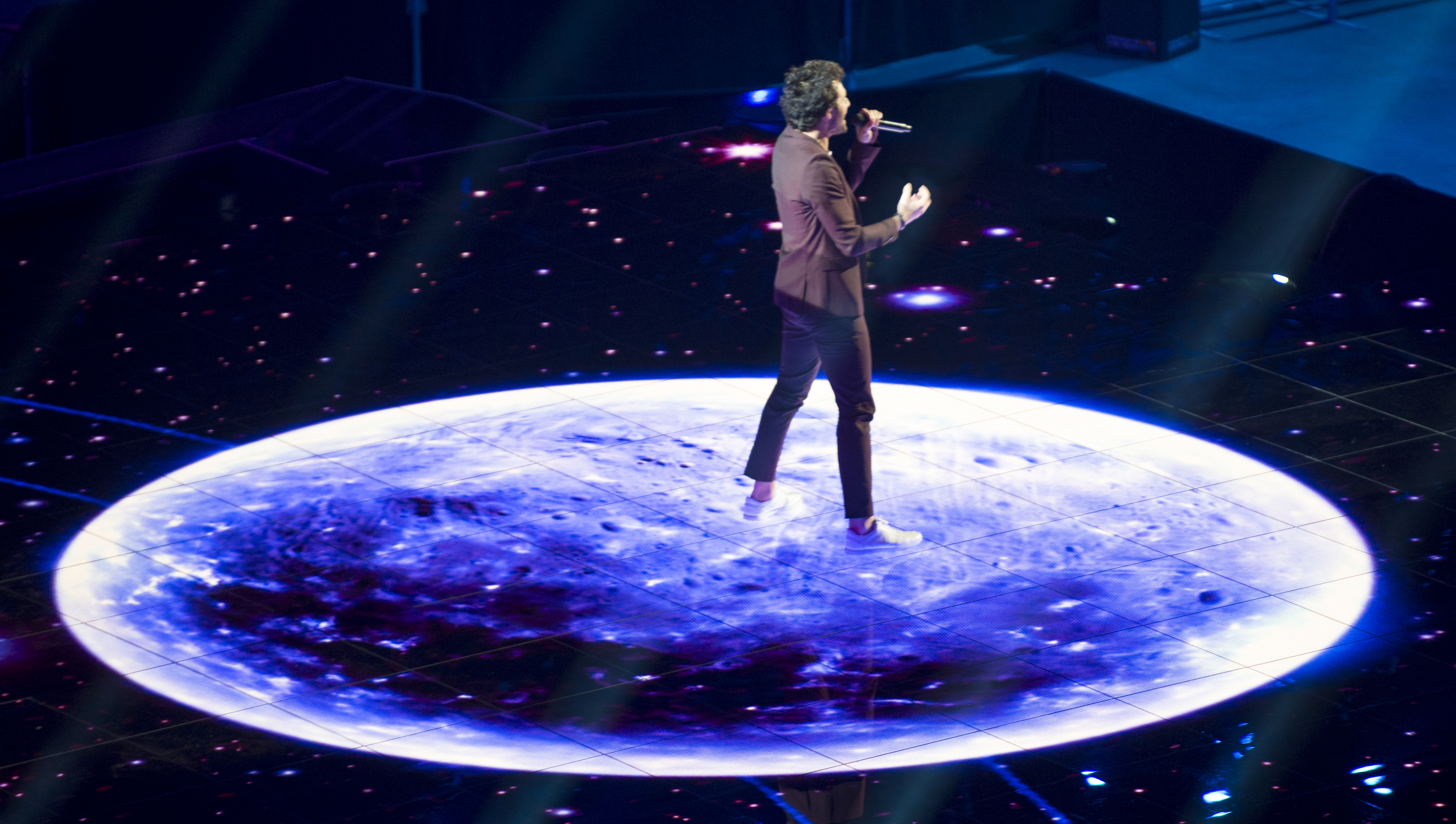
Amir performing at Eurovision 2016

In 2016 he was selected by French public broadcaster France 2 to represent France in the Eurovision Song Contest 2016 in Stockholm, Sweden. Amir's song was chosen internally by France 2 by a committee headed by France 2 entertainment director Nathalie André and the newly appointed French Head of Delegation for the Eurovision Song Contest Edoardo Grassi after having received 280 submissions. The song titled "J'ai cherché" is co-written by Amir himself, Nazim Khaled and Johan Errami and contains lyrics in a bilingual mix of French and English.

France 2 had originally planned to reveal the entry on 12 March 2016, however, information that Amir would represent France at the Eurovision Song Contest 2016 was leaked on 25 February 2016 during the D8 talk show programme Touche pas à mon poste!, hosted by Cyril Hanouna. "J'ai cherché" was edited and remixed by Skydancers and Nazim Khaled at the request of the French broadcaster since the song exceeded three minutes in its original version, which had already been released as the first single from Amir's forthcoming album. The entry was formally presented to the public on 12 March 2016 during the France 2 programme The DiCaire Show, hosted by Véronic DiCaire. The song finished 6th overall in the grand final with 257 points, France's best placing since 2002 and the country's highest-scoring entry in their contest history. He released his second studio album Au cœur de moi on 29 April 2016, the album has peaked at number 6 on the French Albums Chart and has been certified double platinum, the album has also charted in Belgium and Switzerland, earning a gold certification in Switzerland. "On dirait" was released as the third single from the album on 29 August 2016. The song has peaked at number 15 on the French Singles Chart, and on 17 June 2017 won the Chanson de l'Année prize at the Fête de la Musique event in Nîmes. "Au cœur de moi" was released as the fourth single from the album on 6 February 2017.

=== 2017–2020: Addictions ===
He joined Stéphane Bern and Marianne James as a commentator for France 2 at the grand final of the Eurovision Song Contest 2017 in Kyiv on 13 May. Also in 2017, Amir collaborated with OneRepublic on the French remix of their new single "No Vacancy". On 25 August 2017, he released "États d'Amour" as the lead single from his third studio album, which will be released on 27 October 2017. On 7 September 2017, he announced that his third studio album would be titled Addictions.

He served as one of the domestic jury members for the semifinals of Destination Eurovision along with Christophe Willem and Isabelle Boulay to help France choose its entry for the Eurovision Song Contest 2018 in Lisbon. Due to other commitments, he was unable to attend the final and was replaced by his Eurovision successor Alma.

Along with 2019 Swedish Eurovision representative John Lundvik and famed Swedish composers Peter Boström and Thomas G:son, Amir helped co-write the song "Mon alliée (The Best in Me)" for Tom Leeb, who was chosen to represent France at the Eurovision Song Contest 2020 in Rotterdam, Netherlands, before it was cancelled.

=== 2020-present: acting and C Amir ===
In June 2024, he began filming the French adaptation of the popular Israeli romcom television series, Beauty and the Baker. Haddad will play the male lead, the role previously played by Aviv Alush.

In September 2024, he released his fourth French-language studio album, C Amir. The project was influenced by the death of his mother in 2023. The track "Supernova" was inspired by the Re'im music festival massacre in Southern Israel.

== Personal life ==
Whilst attending university, he was diagnosed with attention-deficit hyperactivity disorder.

On 7 July 2014, Amir married Lital, his longtime companion in Israel. Their first child, a son named Mikhaël, was born on 8 February 2019. They welcomed their second son named Or ("Light" in Hebrew) in July 2022.

On 1 November 2024, Amir and his wife revealed they were expecting their third child during the NRJ Music Awards 2024 when Lital appeared with a rounded belly on the red carpet. Amir later confirmed that the baby would be a boy. Their third son, Nuri, was born in February 2025.

Amir also participates in triathlon.

== Philanthropy ==
Amir has been part of the Les Enfoirés troupe since 2017.

== Discography ==
- Vayehi (2011)
- Au cœur de moi (2016)
- Addictions (2017)
- Ressources (2020)
- C Amir (2024)

== Awards and nominations ==
Year	Award	Category	Result
2016	NRJ Music Awards	Francophone Breakthrough of the Year	Won
2016	NRJ Music Awards	Francophone Song of the Year ("J'ai cherché")	Won
2016	MTV Europe Music Awards	Best French Act	Won
2017	NRJ Music Awards	Francophone Duo/Group of the Year (with OneRepublic)	Nominated
2017	NRJ Music Awards	Francophone Song of the Year ("On dirait")	Won
2017	MTV Europe Music Awards	Best French Act	Won
2022	MTV Europe Music Awards	Best French Act	Won

Awards and achievements
Preceded by Lisa Angell with "N'oubliez pas"	France in the Eurovision Song Contest; 2016	Succeeded by Alma with "Requiem"
