= List of top 10 singles in 2015 (France) =

This is a list of singles that have peaked in the top 10 of the French Singles Chart in 2015. 68 singles were in the Top 10 this year which 12 were on the number-one spot.

== Top 10 singles ==
Artist(s)	Single	Peak	Peak date
Soprano	"Fresh Prince"	9	11 January
Louane	"Je vole"	2	11 January
Hozier	"Take Me to Church"	2	18 January
Taylor Swift	"Shake It Off"	6	25 January
Ed Sheeran	"Thinking Out Loud"	4	1 February
Rihanna, Kanye West and Paul McCartney	"FourFiveSeconds"	2	1 February
AronChupa	"I'm an Albatraoz"	7	8 February
Christine and the Queens	"Saint Claude"	4	15 February
Christine and the Queens	"Christine"	3	15 February
Lost Frequencies	"Are You with Me"	4	22 February
The Weeknd	"Earned It"	2	22 February
Louane	"Avenir"	1	8 March
Ariana Grande	"One Last Time"	10	15 March
Ellie Goulding	"Love Me like You Do"	5	15 March
Omi	"Cheerleader" (Felix Jaehn Remix)	1	22 March
Rihanna	"Bitch Better Have My Money"	3	29 March
Celine Dion	"Pour que tu m'aimes encore"	8	5 April
Major Lazer and DJ Snake featuring MØ	"Lean On"	2	5 April
Wiz Khalifa featuring Charlie Puth	"See You Again"	2	12 April
Kygo featuring Conrad Sewell	"Firestone"	5	19 April
Zara Larsson	"Uncover"	5	26 April
Kendji Girac	"Conmigo"	7	3 May
Louane	"Jour 1"	6	3 May
Maître Gims	"Est-ce que tu m'aimes?"	3	3 May
Alonzo and Jul	"Normal"	7	17 May
Marina Kaye	"Homeless"	1	17 May
Jason Derulo	"Want to Want Me"	6	7 June
David Guetta featuring Nicki Minaj, Bebe Rexha and Afrojack	"Hey Mama"	6	14 June
Feder featuring Lyse	"Goodbye"	1	14 June
Maître Gims	"Laissez passer"	7	12 July
Fréro Delavega	"Le chant des sirènes"	9	26 July
Felix Jaehn featuring Jasmine Thompson	"Ain't Nobody (Loves Me Better)"	2	26 July
Kygo featuring Parson James	"Stole the Show"	1	26 July
One Direction	"Drag Me Down"	1	2 August
Nicky Jam featuring Enrique Iglesias	"El Perdón"	1	9 August
Lost Frequencies featuring Janieck Devy	"Reality"	2	23 August
Maître Gims	"Brisé"	6	30 August
Justin Bieber	"What Do You Mean?"	3	30 August
Mylène Farmer and Sting	"Stolen Car"	1	30 August
Booba and Benash	"Validée"	2	6 September
Synapson and Anna Kova	"All in You"	10	13 September
Black M and Kev Adams	"Le prince Aladin"	3	13 September
Calvin Harris and Disciples	"How Deep Is Your Love"	2	13 September
Fababy and Aya Nakamura	"Love d'un voyou"	9	20 September
The Weeknd	"Can't Feel My Face"	5	20 September
Robin Schulz featuring Francesco Yates	"Sugar"	2	20 September
L.E.J	"Summer 2015"	1	27 September
Josef Salvat	"Open Season (Une autre saison)"	10	4 October
One Direction	"Perfect"	8	18 October
R. City featuring Adam Levine	"Locked Away"	4	18 October
Charlie Puth featuring Meghan Trainor	"Marvin Gaye"	1	18 October
X Ambassadors	"Renegades"	10	25 October
Kendji Girac	"Me Quemo"	7	25 October
Kendji Girac	"Les yeux de la mama"	5	25 October
Justin Bieber	"Sorry"	4	25 October
Adele	"Hello"	1	25 October
Mokobé and Gradur	"Wesh"	8	1 November
Ed Sheeran	"Photograph"	9	8 November
Maître Gims and Niska	"Sapés comme jamais"	3	8 November
Sam Smith	"Writing's on the Wall"	5	15 November
John Lennon	"Working Class Hero"	2	15 November
Adam Vadel	"Guru"	4	22 November
Madcon featuring Ray Dalton	"Don't Worry"	2	22 November
Drake	"Hotline Bling"	9	29 November
Ridsa	"Là c'est die"	5	29 November
Marc Lavoine and Bambou	"Dis-moi que l'amour"	4	6 December
David Guetta featuring Sia and Fetty Wap	"Bang My Head"	3	20 December
Coldplay	"Adventure of a Lifetime"	2	20 December

== Entries by artists ==
The following table shows artists who achieved two or more top 10 entries in 2015. The figures include both main artists and featured artists and the peak positions in brackets.

Entries	Artist	Songs
4	Maître Gims	"Est-ce que tu m'aimes?" (3), "Brisé" (6), "Laissez passer" (7), "Sapés comme jamais" (3)
3	Kendji Girac	"Conmigo" (7), "Me Quemo" (7), "Les yeux de la mama" (5)
3	Louane	"Je vole" (2), "Avenir" (1), "Jour 1" (6)
2	Charlie Puth	"See You Again" (2), "Marvin Gaye" (1)
2	Christine and the Queens	"Saint Claude" (4), "Christine" (3)
2	David Guetta	"Hey Mama" (6), "Bang My Head" (3)
2	Ed Sheeran	"Thinking Out Loud" (4), "Photograph" (9)
2	Justin Bieber	"What Do You Mean?" (3), "Sorry" (4)
2	Kygo	"Firestone" (5), "Stole the Show" (1)
2	Lost Frequencies	"Are You with Me" (4), "Reality" (2)
2	One Direction	"Drag Me Down" (1), "Perfect" (8)
2	Rihanna	"FourFiveSeconds" (2), "Bitch Better Have My Money" (3)
2	The Weeknd	"Earned It" (2), "Can't Feel My Face" (5)

== See also ==
- 2015 in music
- List of number-one hits of 2015 (France)
