= Louane discography =

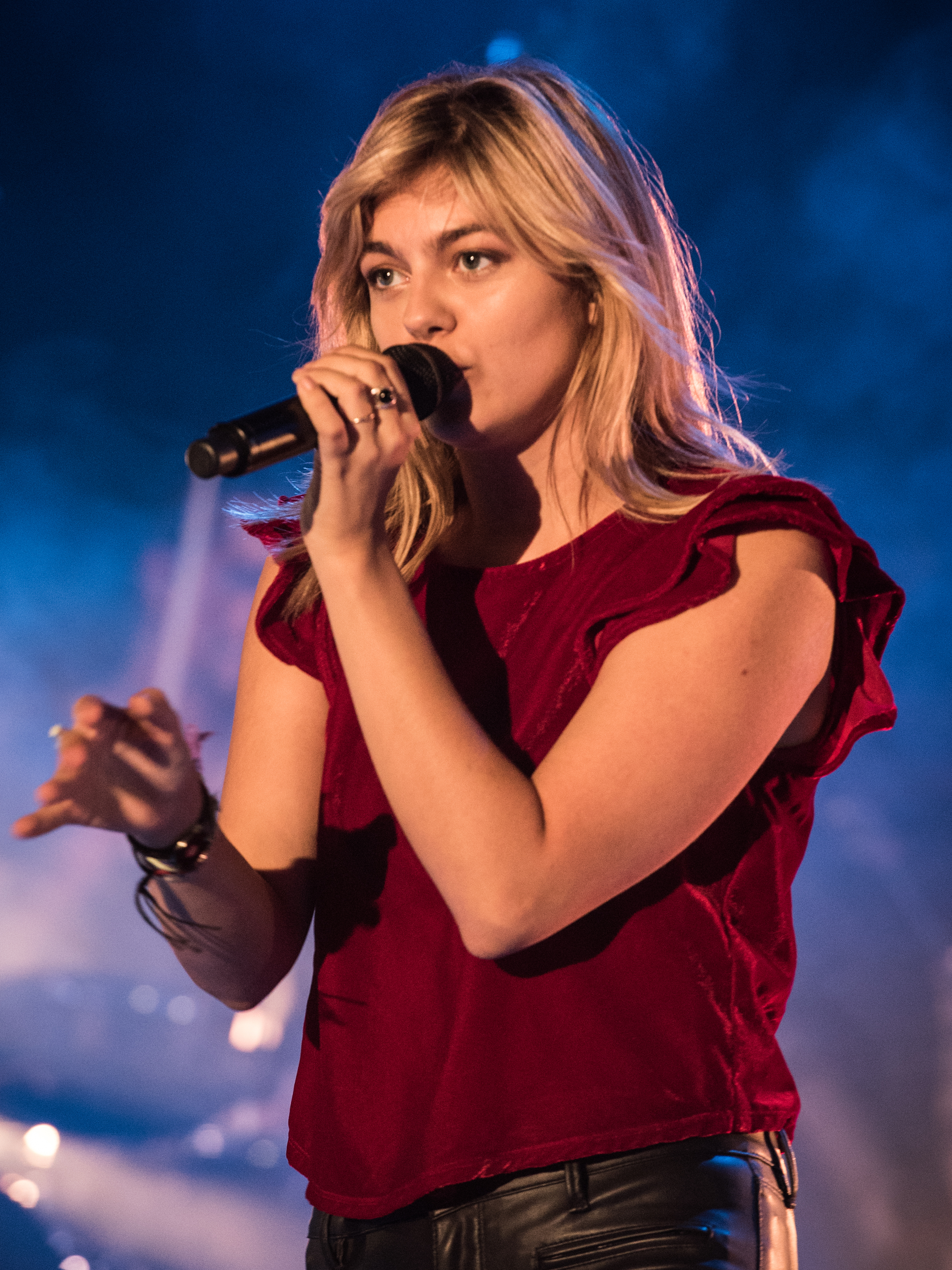
- Louane in 2016
- Studio albums: 5
- EPs: 2
- Singles: 24
- Promotional singles: 5

French singer Louane has released five studio albums, two extended plays, 24 singles (including two as a featured artist), and five promotional singles.

== Albums ==
=== Studio albums ===
List of studio albums, with peak chart positions and certifications
Title	Details	Peak chart positions						Sales	Certifications
Title	Details	FRA	BEL (Fl)	BEL (Wa)	GER	SWI	SWI (Ro)	Sales	Certifications
Chambre 12	Released: 2 March 2015; Formats: CD, digital download, LP; Label: Fontana, Mercury, Universal	1	92	1	22	6	1		SNEP: 2× Diamond; BRMA: Platinum; IFPI SWI: Gold
Louane	Released: 10 November 2017; Formats: CD, digital download, LP; Label: Fontana, Mercury, Universal	1	61	2	53	4	1	FRA: 500,000	SNEP: Diamond; BRMA: Gold
Joie de vivre	Released: 23 October 2020; Formats: CD, digital download, LP; Label: Fontana, Mercury, Universal	6	135	6	92	9	4		SNEP: Platinum
Sentiments	Released: 9 December 2022; Formats: CD, digital download, LP; Label: Fontana, Mercury, Universal	9	—	18	—	24	4		SNEP: Platinum
Solo	Released: 25 October 2024; Formats: CD, digital download, LP; Label: Fontana, Mercury, Universal	8	—	21	—	61	—		
"—" denotes a recording that did not chart or was not released in that territory.

=== Compilation albums ===
List of compilation albums, with peak chart positions and certifications
Title	Details	Peak chart positions		Certifications
Title	Details	FRA	BEL (Wa)	Certifications
Tiens mon best of	Released: 9 May 2025; Formats: CD, digital download; Label: Fontana, Mercury, Universal	6	45	SNEP: Platinum

== Extended plays ==
List of extended plays, with peak chart positions and certifications
Title	Details	Peak chart positions
Title	Details	FRA
Avenir	Released: 1 December 2014; Formats: Digital download; Label: Fontana, Mercury, Universal	198

== Singles ==
=== As lead artist ===
List of singles, with peak chart positions and certifications, showing year released and album name
Title	Year	Peak chart positions									Certifications	Album
Title	Year	FRA	AUT	BEL (Fl)	BEL (Wa)	GER	LTU	POL	SWI	SWI (Ro)	Certifications	Album
"Un homme heureux"	2013	126	—	—	—	—	—	—	—	—		Non-album singles by The Voice: la plus belle voix
"Quelqu'un m'a dit"	2013	146	—	—	—	—	—	—	—	—		Non-album singles by The Voice: la plus belle voix
"Imagine"	2013	160	—	—	—	—	—	—	—	—		Non-album singles by The Voice: la plus belle voix
"Jour 1"	2014	6	—	— (Note: "Jour 1" did not enter the Ultratop 50 Flanders, but peaked at number 49 on the Ultratip chart.)	2	—	—	—	49	6	SNEP: Gold; BRMA: Gold	Chambre 12
"Avenir"	2014	1	4	— (Note: "Avenir" did not enter the Ultratop 50 Flanders, but peaked at number 7 on the Ultratip chart.)	5	3	—	18	42	5	SNEP: Diamond; BRMA: Gold; BVMI: Platinum	Chambre 12
"Jeune (j'ai envie)"	2015	134	—	—	— (Note: "Jeune (j'ai envie)" did not enter the Ultratop 50 Wallonia, but peaked at number 1 on the Ultratip chart.)	—	—	—	—	—		Chambre 12
"Nos secrets"	2015	43	—	—	6	—	—	—	—	—		Chambre 12
"Maman"	2015	18	—	—	11	—	—	—	—	—		Chambre 12
"Tourne"	2016	—	—	—	22	—	—	—	—	—		Chambre 12
"On était beau"	2017	39	—	— (Note: "On était beau" did not enter the Ultratop 50 Flanders, but peaked at number 47 on the Ultratip chart.)	6	—	—	—	76	9	SNEP: Diamond	Louane
"Si t'étais là"	2017	38	—	— (Note: "Si t'étais là" did not enter the Ultratop 50 Flanders, but peaked at number 3 on the Ultratip chart.)	3	—	—	—	49	2	SNEP: Diamond	Louane
"Immobile"	2018	92	—	—	22	—	—	—	—	—		Louane
"No"	2018	88	—	—	26	—	—	—	—	—	SNEP: Gold	Louane
"Midi sur novembre" (featuring Julien Doré)	2018	85	—	—	9	—	—	—	—	—		Louane
"Donne-moi ton cœur"	2020	73	—	—	8	—	—	—	—	8	SNEP: Gold	Joie de vivre
"Peut-être"	2020	—	—	—	—	—	—	—	—	—		Joie de vivre
"Désolée"	2020	—	—	—	36	—	—	—	—	—		Joie de vivre
"Aimer à mort"	2021	78	—	—	41	—	—	—	—	—	SNEP: Diamond	Joie de vivre
"Game Girl"	2021	—	—	—	—	—	—	—	—	—		Pokémon 25: The Album
"Secret"	2022	7	—	—	30	—	—	—	—	—	SNEP: Diamond	Sentiments
"Pardonne-moi"	2023	50	—	—	3	—	—	—	—	—	SNEP: Platinum; BRMA: Gold	Sentiments heureux
"Les étoiles"	2024	110	—	—	29	—	—	—	—	—	SNEP: Gold	Sentiments heureux
"La pluie"	2024	72	—	—	16	—	—	—	—	—	SNEP: Platinum	Solo
"Et Si"	2024	—	—	—	—	—	—	—	—	—		Solo
"Maman"	2025	23	61	—	23	—	39	—	13	—	SNEP: Platinum; BRMA: Platinum	Tiens mon best of
"Orchestra" (20th Anniversary Version) (with Dan Black)	2025	145	—	—	—	—	—	—	—	—	SNEP: Gold	Non-album singles
"Chiens"	2025	— (Note: "Chiens" did not enter the French Top Singles chart, but peaked at number 16 on the French Top Radio chart.)	—	—	—	—	—	—	—	—		Non-album singles
"Gabrielle" (with Waxx)	2025	—	—	—	—	—	—	—	—	—		Non-album singles
"Conduire"	2026	—	—	—	—	—	—	—	—	—		Watch Out
"Tout pour toi" (with Elisa Palmire)	2026	—	—	—	—	—	—	—	—	—		Watch Out
"Yeux"	2026	—	—	—	—	—	—	—	—	—		Watch Out
"Mode avion"	2026	—	—	—	42	—	—	—	—	—		Watch Out
"—" denotes a recording that did not chart or was not released in that territory.

=== As featured artist ===
List of singles, with peak chart positions, showing year released and album name
Title	Year	Peak chart positions			Certifications	Album
Title	Year	FRA	CAN	US Dance	Certifications	Album
"It Won't Kill Ya" (The Chainsmokers featuring Louane)	2017	70	84	24		Memories...Do Not Open
"Derrière le brouillard" (Grand Corps Malade with Louane)	2020	42	—	—	SNEP: Diamond	Mesdames
"Tissues" (Yungblud featuring Louane)	2022	40 (Radio)	—	—		Yungblud
"Voyage" (Zoë Më featuring Louane)	2025	—	—	—		Non-album singles
"Une fleur en été" (Blowsom featuring Louane)	2026	—	—	—		Non-album singles
"—" denotes a recording that did not chart or was not released in that territory.

== Promotional singles ==
List of promotional singles, with peak chart positions, showing year released and album name
Title	Year	Peak chart positions	Album
Title	Year	FRA	Album
"Chambre 12"	2015	129	Chambre 12
"Poésie indécise"	2020	—	Joie de vivre
"Tornade"	2021	—	Joie de vivre
"Comment faire"	2021	—	Joie de vivre
"La fille"	2022	—	Sentiments
"Soleil" (featuring P3gase)	2024	—	Solo

== Other charted songs ==
List of other charted songs, with peak chart positions and certifications, showing year released and album name
Title	Year	Peak chart positions			Certifications	Album
Title	Year	FRA	BEL (Wa)	SWI	Certifications	Album
"Je vole"	2014	2	15	73	SNEP: Gold	La famille Bélier: Bande Originale du film
"Je vais t'aimer"	2014	36	—	—		La famille Bélier: Bande Originale du film
"En chantant"	2014	83	—	—		La famille Bélier: Bande Originale du film
"Rester seule"	2015	181	—	—		Chambre 12
"Le chasseur"	2016	89	—	—		J'étais un ange – Michel Delpech
"Jour de pluie"	2017	142	—	—		Louane
"Toute la musique que j'aime"	2017	83	—	—		On a tous quelque chose de Johnny
"—" denotes a recording that did not chart or was not released in that territory.
