= 2015 in European music =

2015 in continental European music in geographical order.

== Scandinavia ==
- Main article for Scandinavian music in 2015

=== Denmark ===
- Main article for Danish music in 2015
- Denmark in the Eurovision Song Contest 2015
- Danish #1s 2015
- At the nonprofit Roskilde Festival acts are Paul McCartney, Florence + the Machine, Kendrick Lamar, Muse, Noel Gallagher's High Flying Birds, Pharrell Williams and Nicki Minaj
- Lukas Graham's "Lukas Graham (Blue Album)" is a #1 just like its singles "7 Years" and "Strip No More".

=== Finland ===
- Main article for Finnish music in 2015
- Finland in the Eurovision Song Contest 2015
- Finnish #1 singles2015, #1 albums
- Hiphoppers Teflon Brothers had a #1 with "Pämppää"
- Rap duo JVG topped the charts with "Tarkenee".
- Rapper Cheek had a #1 album Alpha Omega and a #1 single Sä huudat.

=== Norway ===
- Main article for Norwegian music in 2015
- Norway in the Eurovision Song Contest 2015
- Norway charts 2015
- Tungevaag & Raaban's "Samsara 2015" is a hit in Scandinavia, in Finland it reaches #1.
- Kygo, a DJ, had several #1s with Firestone, Stole the Show (also #1 in Sweden and France) and Nothing Left
- Madcon's, Don't worry ends #1 in Hungary, Czech Republic and is charted in various other European countries.

=== Sweden ===
- Main article for Swedish music in 2015
- Sweden in the Eurovision Song Contest 2015
- Swedish #1 singles and albums
- Måns Zelmerlöw won the Eurovision Song Contest 2015 with his song Heroes. It topped the charts in Sweden, Greece, Iceland and Poland.
- Waiting for Love, Aviciis latest single, was a #1 in Sweden, Norway, Austria and Hungary.
- 17 year old Zara Larsson had a #1 song with Lush Life, also a top 5 hit in many European countries.
- Axwell and Ingrosso's Sun Is Shining, ended #1 on the Sverigetopplistan and it also reached top 10s in The Netherlands, Norway, Belgium and Finland.

== Netherlands ==
Dutch #1 singles

- Kenneth Bron ("Kenny B) of Surinamese origin was #1 for 11 weeks with "Parijs".
- "Drank & Drugs" from Lil' Kleine and Ronnie Flex spent three weeks at number one.

== Belgium (two different charts for Flanders and Wallonie) ==
- DJ Felix De Laet's project Lost Frequencies have a major hit with a cover of Easton Corbin's Are You with Me. It was a #1 in Belgium, Ireland, UK, Sweden, Finland, Romania, Poland, Germany, Switzerland and Austria. The follow-up hit "Reality" was a #1 in Belgium, Austria, Germany and Poland.
- Casting star Loïc Nottet had his first #1 with "Rhythm Inside" (in both parts of the country) and represented Belgium in Eurovision 2015 and came 5th overall
- DJ brothers Dimitri Vegas & Like Mike had two #1s in "The Hum"(vs. Ummet Ozcan) and "Higher Place"(featuring Ne-Yo) in Flanders.

== UK and Ireland ==
- Main article for Irish music in 2015
- Main article for British music in 2015

== Germany ==
- German number ones 2015
- Essen's controversial rapper Favorite had his first #1 album with Neues von Gott (Selfmade Records)., Hamburg's fun rappers Deichkind also have their first #1 album with "Niveau weshalb warum" even though both its singles don't enter the Top20.
  Two hiphoppers from Berlin also have charttopping albums without hit singles, Fler a.k.a. "Frank White" is #1 with "Keiner kommt klar mit mir", Bushido's album is called "Carlo Cokxxx Nutten 3".
- Crooner Wolfgang Petry had a #1 album with "Brandneu".
- 20-year-old DJ Felix Jaehn remixes Jamaican OMI's song Cheerleader which became a #1 in numerous countries. He also produces Jasmine Thompson's cover version of Ain't Nobody which became a #1 in Germany and eight other countries.
- Sarah Connor's album Muttersprache topped the German and Swiss charts.
- Rapper Cro had his third #1 with "ByeBye", it also cracked the Swiss and Austrian top ten.
- Kurdish rapper Xatar, fresh out of jail after being part of a €1.7 mio robbery, had a #1 album with "Baba aller Babas".
- Anna Naklab and Alle Farben are #2 in Germany and #1 in Austria with a cover of Supergirl.
- Lindemann featuring Rammstein frontman Till Lindemann and Swede Peter Tägtgren published the album Skills in Pills. It's a #1 in Finland and Germany.
- Electronic DJ and producer Robin Schulz' new hit Sugar ft Canadian Francesco Yates was #1 in Germany and Austria.
- Rapper Sido's first ever #1 single was a collaboration with Andreas Bourani titled "Astronaut"; it also topped the Swiss and Austrian charts.
- Ann Sophie who replaced qualifier Andreas Kümmert failed to get a single point at the ESC with her song Black Smoke (written by British pop singer Ella Eyre)

== Switzerland and Austria ==
- Swiss #1s
- Sophie Hunger had her third #1 album, "Supermoon" is also #6 in Germany.
- Austria #1 singles
- Folk singer Andreas Gabalier had his fourth platinum album in a row with Mountain Man. It's also #1 in Germany and Switzerland.
- Electro swing DJ Parov Stelar had his first #1 album, a German #8, with "The Demon Diaries"

== France ==
- French #1s 2015
- Both Louane Emera's single Avenir and her album Chambre 12 reached the #1 position.
- Talent show winner Marina Kaye became #1 with Homeless
- Deep House DJ "Feder" from Nice had a #1 in France, Switzerland and Hungary with Goodbye.
- Mylene Farmer and Sting had a #1 with Stolen Car

== Portugal ==
- Pop rappers D.A.M.A are the breakthrough Portuguese act; their album "Uma Questão De Princípio" is #1 for 19 weeks. The singer and composer Agir wins the MTV award for Best Portuguese Act.

== Spain ==
- American Nicky Jam's #1 single El Perdon featured Spanish singer Enrique Iglesias, it also topped the Swiss, Dutch and Italian charts.
- In June, Enrique Iglesias injured his hand in Tijuana as he tried to grab a drone that was filming his concert.
- Álvaro Soler had an Italian and Swiss #1 with El mismo sol.

== Italy ==
Italian number ones 2015

- Operatic pop trio Il Volo represented Italy at the ESC with their #1 Grande amore and came third overall.
- Eros Ramazzotti's thirteenth studio album Perfetto is #1 in Italy and top 5 in many other European countries.
- Rapper Baby K featuring Giusy Ferreri had a platinum hit with Roma-Bangkok
- German-speaking Frei.Wild's album "Opposition" is a #1 in Germany and Austria and #2 in Switzerland, the singles "Unvergessen, unvergänglich, lebenslänglich" and "Wir brechen eure Seelen" reach the German top 10.

== Eastern Europe/ Balkans ==
- List of Polish #1 singles
- Czech #1 singles
- Hungarian #1 singles
- Hungary's Sziget Festival featured Robbie Williams, Kings of Leon, Ellie Goulding, Limp Bizkit, Major Lazer
- Albanian singer Elhaida Dani participated in the ESC with "I'm Alive"; it charted in Macedonia, was a #1 in Albania and also made the top 100 in Iceland, Belgium and Montenegro
- Estonian duo Elina Born & Stig Rästa got a Eurovision hit named Goodbye To Yesterday charted 1 in Estonia and charted in top 10 in Finland, Austria and Russia.

== Musical films ==
- The Lure (Poland), starring Marta Mazurek and Michalina Olszańska.

== Deaths ==
- 29 January – Maurizio Arcieri, Italian singer (The New Dada and Krisma), 72
- 1 February – Aldo Ciccolini, Italian-born French pianist, 89
- 12 February – Désiré Dondeyne, French composer, 93
- 17 February – Andrzej Koszewski, Polish composer, 92
- 12 March – Erol Büyükburç, Turkish pop music composer and singer, 78
- 20 April – Richard Anthony, 77, Egyptian-French singer-songwriter
- 14 June – Boris Godjunov, Bulgarian singer, 74
- 27 June – Chris Squire, best known as the English bassist and founding member of the Progressive Rock band Yes
- 2 July – Slavko Avsenik, Slovene composer and folk musician, 85
- 16 September – Guy Béart, French singer-songwriter, 85
- 19 December – Kurt Masur, German conductor, 88
