= List of number-one hits of 2015 (France) =

This is a list of the French SNEP Top 100 Singles and Top 200 Albums number-ones of 2015.

== Number ones by week ==
=== Singles chart ===
Week	Issue date	Download			Streaming	
Week	Issue date	Artist(s)	Title	Ref.	Artist(s)	Title
1	4 January	Mark Ronson featuring Bruno Mars	"Uptown Funk"		Mark Ronson featuring Bruno Mars	"Uptown Funk"
2	11 January	Mark Ronson featuring Bruno Mars	"Uptown Funk"		Mark Ronson featuring Bruno Mars	"Uptown Funk"
3	18 January	Mark Ronson featuring Bruno Mars	"Uptown Funk"		Mark Ronson featuring Bruno Mars	"Uptown Funk"
4	25 January	Mark Ronson featuring Bruno Mars	"Uptown Funk"		Mark Ronson featuring Bruno Mars	"Uptown Funk"
5	1 February	Mark Ronson featuring Bruno Mars	"Uptown Funk"		Mark Ronson featuring Bruno Mars	"Uptown Funk"
6	8 February	Mark Ronson featuring Bruno Mars	"Uptown Funk"		Mark Ronson featuring Bruno Mars	"Uptown Funk"
7	15 February	Mark Ronson featuring Bruno Mars	"Uptown Funk"		Hozier	"Take Me to Church"
8	22 February	Mark Ronson featuring Bruno Mars	"Uptown Funk"		The Weeknd	"Earned It"
9	1 March	Mark Ronson featuring Bruno Mars	"Uptown Funk"		The Weeknd	"Earned It"
10	8 March	Louane	"Avenir"		Louane	"Avenir"
11	15 March	Louane	"Avenir"		Louane	"Avenir"
12	22 March	Omi	"Cheerleader" (Felix Jaehn Remix)		Louane	"Avenir"
13	29 March	Omi	"Cheerleader" (Felix Jaehn Remix)		Omi	"Cheerleader" (Felix Jaehn Remix)
14	5 April	Omi	"Cheerleader" (Felix Jaehn Remix)		Omi	"Cheerleader" (Felix Jaehn Remix)
15	12 April	Omi	"Cheerleader" (Felix Jaehn Remix)		Major Lazer & DJ Snake featuring MØ	"Lean On"
16	19 April	Omi	"Cheerleader" (Felix Jaehn Remix)		Major Lazer & DJ Snake featuring MØ	"Lean On"
17	26 April	Omi	"Cheerleader" (Felix Jaehn Remix)		Major Lazer & DJ Snake featuring MØ	"Lean On"
18	3 May	Omi	"Cheerleader" (Felix Jaehn Remix)		Major Lazer & DJ Snake featuring MØ	"Lean On"
19	10 May	Omi	"Cheerleader" (Felix Jaehn Remix)		Major Lazer & DJ Snake featuring MØ	"Lean On"
20	17 May	Marina Kaye	"Homeless"		Major Lazer & DJ Snake featuring MØ	"Lean On"
21	24 May	Marina Kaye	"Homeless"		Major Lazer & DJ Snake featuring MØ	"Lean On"
22	31 May	Omi	"Cheerleader" (Felix Jaehn Remix)		Major Lazer & DJ Snake featuring MØ	"Lean On"
23	7 June	Omi	"Cheerleader" (Felix Jaehn Remix)		Major Lazer & DJ Snake featuring MØ	"Lean On"
24	14 June	Feder featuring Lyse	"Goodbye"		Major Lazer & DJ Snake featuring MØ	"Lean On"
25	21 June	Feder featuring Lyse	"Goodbye"		Major Lazer & DJ Snake featuring MØ	"Lean On"
26	28 June	Feder featuring Lyse	"Goodbye"		Major Lazer & DJ Snake featuring MØ	"Lean On"
27	5 July	Feder featuring Lyse	"Goodbye"		Major Lazer & DJ Snake featuring MØ	"Lean On"
28	12 July	Feder featuring Lyse	"Goodbye"		Major Lazer & DJ Snake featuring MØ	"Lean On"
29	19 July	Feder featuring Lyse	"Goodbye"		Major Lazer & DJ Snake featuring MØ	"Lean On"
30	26 July	Kygo featuring Parson James	"Stole the Show"		Major Lazer & DJ Snake featuring MØ	"Lean On"
31	2 August	One Direction	"Drag Me Down"		Major Lazer & DJ Snake featuring MØ	"Lean On"
32	9 August	Nicky Jam featuring Enrique Iglesias	"El Perdón"		Major Lazer & DJ Snake featuring MØ	"Lean On"
33	16 August	Nicky Jam featuring Enrique Iglesias	"El Perdón"		Major Lazer & DJ Snake featuring MØ	"Lean On"
34	23 August	Nicky Jam featuring Enrique Iglesias	"El Perdón"		Major Lazer & DJ Snake featuring MØ	"Lean On"
35	30 August	Mylène Farmer & Sting	"Stolen Car"		Nicky Jam featuring Enrique Iglesias	"El Perdón"
36	6 September	Nicky Jam featuring Enrique Iglesias	"El Perdón"		Nicky Jam featuring Enrique Iglesias	"El Perdón"
37	13 September	Nicky Jam featuring Enrique Iglesias	"El Perdón"		Nicky Jam featuring Enrique Iglesias	"El Perdón"
38	20 September	Nicky Jam featuring Enrique Iglesias	"El Perdón"		Nicky Jam featuring Enrique Iglesias	"El Perdón"
39	27 September	L.E.J	"Summer 2015"		Nicky Jam featuring Enrique Iglesias	"El Perdón"
40	4 October	L.E.J	"Summer 2015"		Nicky Jam featuring Enrique Iglesias	"El Perdón"
41	11 October	Mylène Farmer & Sting	"Stolen Car"		Nicky Jam featuring Enrique Iglesias	"El Perdón"
42	18 October	Charlie Puth featuring Meghan Trainor	"Marvin Gaye"		Nicky Jam featuring Enrique Iglesias	"El Perdón"
43	25 October	Adele	"Hello"		Maître Gims featuring Niska	"Sapés comme jamais"
44	1 November	Adele	"Hello"		Adele	"Hello"
45	8 November	Adele	"Hello"		Maître Gims featuring Niska	"Sapés comme jamais"
46	15 November	Adele	"Hello"		Maître Gims featuring Niska	"Sapés comme jamais"
47	22 November	Adele	"Hello"		Maître Gims featuring Niska	"Sapés comme jamais"
48	29 November	Adele	"Hello"		Maître Gims featuring Niska	"Sapés comme jamais"
49	6 December	Adele	"Hello"		Jul	"En Y"
50	13 December	Adele	"Hello"		Jul	"Amnésia"
51	20 December	Adele	"Hello"		Maître Gims featuring Niska	"Sapés comme jamais"
52	27 December	Adele	"Hello"		Maître Gims featuring Niska	"Sapés comme jamais"

=== Albums chart ===
Week	Issue date	Artist(s)	Album	Ref.
1	4 January	Kendji Girac	Kendji	
2	11 January	Kendji Girac	Kendji	
3	18 January	Kendji Girac	Kendji	
4	25 January	Kendji Girac	Kendji	
5	1 February	Kendji Girac	Kendji	
6	8 February	M. Pokora	R.E.D.	
7	15 February	M. Pokora	R.E.D.	
8	22 February	Fauve	Vieux frères – Partie 2	
9	1 March	Gradur	L'homme au bob	
10	8 March	Louane	Chambre 12	
11	15 March	Les Enfoirés	Sur la route des Enfoirés	
12	22 March	Les Enfoirés	Sur la route des Enfoirés	
13	29 March	Les Enfoirés	Sur la route des Enfoirés	
14	5 April	Louane	Chambre 12	
15	12 April	Louane	Chambre 12	
16	19 April	Booba	D.U.C	
17	26 April	Louane	Chambre 12	
18	3 May	Francis Cabrel	In Extremis	
19	10 May	Francis Cabrel	In Extremis	
20	17 May	Francis Cabrel	In Extremis	
21	24 May	Francis Cabrel	In Extremis	
22	31 May	Francis Cabrel	In Extremis	
23	7 June	Lacrim	R.I.P.R.O. Vol. 1	
24	14 June	Muse	Drones	
25	21 June	Muse	Drones	
26	28 June	Louane	Chambre 12	
27	5 July	Louane	Chambre 12	
28	12 July	Louane	Chambre 12	
29	19 July	Louane	Chambre 12	
30	26 July	Louane	Chambre 12	
31	2 August	Louane	Chambre 12	
32	9 August	Dr. Dre	Compton	
33	16 August	Louane	Chambre 12	
34	23 August	Louane	Chambre 12	
35	30 August	Maître Gims	Mon cœur avait raison	
36	6 September	Maître Gims	Mon cœur avait raison	
37	13 September	Maître Gims	Mon cœur avait raison	
38	20 September	David Gilmour	Rattle That Lock	
39	27 September	Various artists	Corsu - Mezu Mezu	
40	4 October	Various artists	Corsu - Mezu Mezu	
41	11 October	Various artists	Corsu - Mezu Mezu	
42	18 October	Various artists	Corsu - Mezu Mezu	
43	25 October	Keen'V	Là où le vent me mène	
44	1 November	Kendji Girac	Ensemble	
45	8 November	Mylène Farmer	Interstellaires	
46	15 November	Johnny Hallyday	De l'amour	
47	22 November	Adele	25	
48	29 November	Adele	25	
49	6 December	Adele	25	
50	13 December	Adele	25	
51	20 December	Adele	25	
52	27 December	Adele	25	
53	3 January	Adele	25	

== See also ==
- 2015 in music
- List of number-one hits (France)
- List of top 10 singles in 2015 (France)
