= France in the Eurovision Song Contest 2026 =

- Eurovision Song Contest 2026
- Participating broadcaster: France Télévisions
- Country: France
- Selection process: Internal selection
- Announcement date: 6 March 2026

Competing entry
- Song: "Regarde !"
- Artist: Monroe
- Songwriters: Christopher Cohen; Fredie Marche; Maxime Morise; Fred Savio

Placement
- Final result: 11th, 158 points

Participation chronology

France was represented at the Eurovision Song Contest 2026 with the song "Regarde!", written by Christopher Cohen, Fredie Marche, Maxime Morise, and Fred Savio, and performed by Monroe. The French participating broadcaster, France Télévisions, internally selected its entry for the contest.

As a member of the "Big Four", France automatically qualified to compete in the final of the Eurovision Song Contest.

== Background ==
Prior to the 2026 contest, France Télévisions and its predecessor national broadcasters have participated in the Eurovision Song Contest representing France sixty-seven times since RTF's debut in the inaugural contest. They first won the contest in 1958 with "Dors, mon amour" performed by André Claveau. In the 1960s, they won three times, with "Tom Pillibi" performed by Jacqueline Boyer in 1960, "Un premier amour" performed by Isabelle Aubret in 1962, and "Un jour, un enfant" performed by Frida Boccara, who won in 1969 in a four-way tie with the Netherlands, Spain, and the United Kingdom. Their fifth – and so far latest – victory came in 1977 with "L'oiseau et l'enfant" performed by Marie Myriam. France has also finished second five times, with Paule Desjardins in 1957, Catherine Ferry in 1976, Joëlle Ursull in 1990, Amina in 1991 (who lost out to Sweden's Carola in a tie-break), and Barbara Pravi in 2021. In the 21st century, France has had less success, only making the top ten five times, with Natasha St-Pier finishing fourth in 2001, Sandrine François finishing fifth in 2002, Patricia Kaas finishing eighth in 2009, Amir finishing sixth in 2016, and Pravi finishing second in 2021 with 499 points. In 2025, it finished in seventh place with the song "Maman" performed by Louane.

As part of its duties as participating broadcaster, France Télévisions organises the selection of its entry in the Eurovision Song Contest and broadcasts the event in the country through France 2. The French broadcasters have used both national finals and internal selections to choose their entries in the past, sticking to internal selections since 2023. France Télévisions confirmed its intention to participate in the 2026 contest in September 2025.

== Before Eurovision ==
=== Internal selection ===
On 2 March 2026, multiple French outlets reported that French-American singer Monroe Rigby had been selected as the French entrant for the 2026 contest; this was later confirmed on 6 March, with France Télévisions also unveiling her entry, "Regarde!".

=== Promotion ===
As part of the promotion of her participation in the contest, Monroe attended the Eurovision in Concert event in Amsterdam on 11 April 2026. On 30 April 2026, she travelled to Warsaw, where she met Polish representative Alicja before appearing alongside her on the morning show Pytanie na śniadanie, broadcast on TVP2.

== At Eurovision ==
The Eurovision Song Contest 2026 took take place at the Wiener Stadthalle in Vienna, Austria, and consisted of two semi-finals held on the respective dates of 12 and 14 May and the final on 16 May 2026. All nations with the exceptions of the host country and the "Big Four" (France, Germany, Italy, and the United Kingdom) were required to qualify from one of two semi-finals in order to compete in the final; the top ten countries from each semi-final progressed to the final. As a member of the "Big Four", France automatically qualified to compete in the final on 16 May 2026, but was also required to broadcast and vote in one of the two semi-finals. This was decided via a draw held during the semi-final allocation draw on 12 January 2026, when it was announced that France would be voting in the second semi-final. Despite being an automatic qualifier for the final, the French entry was also performed during the semi-final.

=== Voting ===
==== Points awarded to France ====
Points awarded to France (Final)
| Score | Televote | Jury |
|---|---|---|
| 12 points | | Finland; Georgia; United Kingdom |
| 10 points | | Australia; Norway |
| 8 points | | Armenia; Greece |
| 7 points | | Malta; Switzerland |
| 6 points | | Germany; Latvia; Luxembourg |
| 5 points | | Belgium; Portugal; Ukraine |
| 4 points | | Albania; Austria |
| 3 points | | Croatia; Cyprus; Czechia; Denmark |
| 2 points | Armenia; Cyprus; Greece; Israel; Luxembourg; Portugal | Moldova; Sweden |
| 1 point | Australia; Norway | Lithuania |

==== Points awarded by France ====
Points awarded by France (Semi-final 2)
| Score | Televote | Jury |
|---|---|---|
| 12 points | Bulgaria | Norway |
| 10 points | Romania | Ukraine |
| 8 points | Ukraine | Denmark |
| 7 points | Albania | Australia |
| 6 points | Armenia | Bulgaria |
| 5 points | Malta | Malta |
| 4 points | Australia | Switzerland |
| 3 points | Latvia | Romania |
| 2 points | Luxembourg | Czechia |
| 1 point | Switzerland | Armenia |

Points awarded by France (Final)
| Score | Televote | Jury |
|---|---|---|
| 12 points | Israel | Norway |
| 10 points | Moldova | Denmark |
| 8 points | Romania | Italy |
| 7 points | Bulgaria | Bulgaria |
| 6 points | Ukraine | Ukraine |
| 5 points | Italy | Australia |
| 4 points | Albania | Israel |
| 3 points | Greece | Malta |
| 2 points | Finland | Finland |
| 1 point | Croatia | Serbia |

==== Detailed voting results ====
Each participating broadcaster assembles a seven-member jury panel consisting of music industry professionals who are citizens of the country they represent and two of which have to be between 18 and 25 years old. Each jury, and individual jury member, is required to meet a strict set of criteria regarding professional background, as well as diversity in gender and age. No member of a national jury was permitted to be related in any way to any of the competing acts in such a way that they cannot vote impartially and independently. The individual rankings of each jury member as well as the nation's televoting results were released shortly after the grand final.

The following members comprised the French jury:

- Benjamin Kern
- Clément Julia
- François Troller
- Thomas Isle
- Delphine Malem
- Myla Rosenfeld
- Valérie Zipper

Detailed voting results from France (Semi-final 2)
| R/O | Country | Jury | | | | | | | | | Televote | |
| R/O | Country | Juror A | Juror B | Juror C | Juror D | Juror E | Juror F | Juror G | Rank | Points | Rank | Points |
|---|---|---|---|---|---|---|---|---|---|---|---|---|
| 01 | Bulgaria | 2 | 7 | 1 | 12 | 5 | 6 | 14 | 5 | 6 | 1 | 12 |
| 02 | Azerbaijan | 12 | 12 | 8 | 13 | 15 | 13 | 15 | 15 | | 15 | |
| 03 | Romania | 5 | 11 | 6 | 2 | 4 | 14 | 7 | 8 | 3 | 2 | 10 |
| 04 | Luxembourg | 9 | 5 | 15 | 15 | 14 | 4 | 11 | 12 | | 9 | 2 |
| 05 | Czechia | 3 | 6 | 11 | 3 | 12 | 15 | 5 | 9 | 2 | 13 | |
| 06 | Armenia | 6 | 8 | 3 | 5 | 7 | 11 | 13 | 10 | 1 | 5 | 6 |
| 07 | Switzerland | 11 | 10 | 12 | 4 | 1 | 3 | 8 | 7 | 4 | 10 | 1 |
| 08 | Cyprus | 10 | 14 | 9 | 14 | 6 | 10 | 12 | 13 | | 11 | |
| 09 | Latvia | 14 | 13 | 10 | 1 | 10 | 9 | 10 | 11 | | 8 | 3 |
| 10 | Denmark | 1 | 3 | 2 | 8 | 11 | 8 | 9 | 3 | 8 | 14 | |
| 11 | Australia | 13 | 2 | 5 | 7 | 9 | 7 | 1 | 4 | 7 | 7 | 4 |
| 12 | Ukraine | 7 | 4 | 4 | 10 | 8 | 2 | 2 | 2 | 10 | 3 | 8 |
| 13 | Albania | 15 | 15 | 13 | 11 | 13 | 12 | 6 | 14 | | 4 | 7 |
| 14 | Malta | 4 | 9 | 14 | 9 | 2 | 5 | 3 | 6 | 5 | 6 | 5 |
| 15 | Norway | 8 | 1 | 7 | 6 | 3 | 1 | 4 | 1 | 12 | 12 | |

Detailed voting results from France (Final)
| R/O | Country | Jury | | | | | | | | | Televote | |
| R/O | Country | Juror A | Juror B | Juror C | Juror D | Juror E | Juror F | Juror G | Rank | Points | Rank | Points |
|---|---|---|---|---|---|---|---|---|---|---|---|---|
| 01 | Denmark | 12 | 9 | 6 | 1 | 3 | 2 | 8 | 2 | 10 | 18 | |
| 02 | Germany | 10 | 15 | 13 | 8 | 13 | 14 | 10 | 16 | | 22 | |
| 03 | Israel | 8 | 6 | 4 | 5 | 8 | 10 | 9 | 7 | 4 | 1 | 12 |
| 04 | Belgium | 20 | 24 | 11 | 6 | 10 | 22 | 19 | 17 | | 19 | |
| 05 | Albania | 22 | 14 | 18 | 22 | 11 | 23 | 16 | 23 | | 7 | 4 |
| 06 | Greece | 21 | 20 | 16 | 21 | 24 | 8 | 14 | 20 | | 8 | 3 |
| 07 | Ukraine | 23 | 7 | 8 | 3 | 2 | 4 | 11 | 5 | 6 | 5 | 6 |
| 08 | Australia | 18 | 4 | 2 | 4 | 4 | 13 | 13 | 6 | 5 | 11 | |
| 09 | Serbia | 1 | 3 | 21 | 24 | 21 | 18 | 24 | 10 | 1 | 14 | |
| 10 | Malta | 4 | 8 | 10 | 13 | 5 | 12 | 4 | 8 | 3 | 13 | |
| 11 | Czechia | 9 | 5 | 15 | 19 | 19 | 7 | 15 | 15 | | 15 | |
| 12 | Bulgaria | 6 | 18 | 5 | 2 | 9 | 3 | 6 | 4 | 7 | 4 | 7 |
| 13 | Croatia | 13 | 13 | 20 | 18 | 14 | 21 | 18 | 22 | | 10 | 1 |
| 14 | United Kingdom | 5 | 19 | 22 | 20 | 23 | 16 | 21 | 18 | | 23 | |
| 15 | France | | | | | | | | | | | |
| 16 | Moldova | 17 | 22 | 24 | 23 | 22 | 24 | 23 | 24 | | 2 | 10 |
| 17 | Finland | 16 | 17 | 7 | 10 | 6 | 5 | 5 | 9 | 2 | 9 | 2 |
| 18 | Poland | 14 | 23 | 9 | 7 | 7 | 20 | 3 | 11 | | 12 | |
| 19 | Lithuania | 24 | 11 | 23 | 12 | 17 | 15 | 20 | 21 | | 21 | |
| 20 | Sweden | 2 | 12 | 12 | 11 | 20 | 19 | 22 | 14 | | 20 | |
| 21 | Cyprus | 19 | 16 | 17 | 15 | 18 | 9 | 12 | 19 | | 16 | |
| 22 | Italy | 7 | 2 | 1 | 14 | 12 | 17 | 1 | 3 | 8 | 6 | 5 |
| 23 | Norway | 11 | 1 | 3 | 16 | 1 | 6 | 2 | 1 | 12 | 17 | |
| 24 | Romania | 3 | 10 | 19 | 9 | 16 | 11 | 7 | 12 | | 3 | 8 |
| 25 | Austria | 15 | 21 | 14 | 17 | 15 | 1 | 17 | 13 | | 24 | |
