= 2015 in music =

This topic covers notable events and articles related to music in 2015.

== Specific locations ==
- African music
- American music
- Australian music
- Brazilian music
- British music
- Canadian music
- Chinese music
- Danish music
- European music (Continental Europe)
- Finnish music
- French music
- German music
- Icelandic music
- Indian music
- Irish music
- Japanese music
- Malaysian music
- Mongolian music
- North Korean music
- Norwegian music
- Philippine music
- Polynesian music
- Scandinavian music
- South Korean music
- Swedish music
- Taiwanese music
- Vietnamese music
- World music

== Specific genres ==
- Classical
- Country
- Electronic
- Heavy metal
- Hip-hop
- House
- Jazz
- Latin
- Opera
- Pop
- Progressive rock
- Rock
- K-pop
- J-pop

== Albums released ==
- List of 2015 albums

== Awards ==
2015 Billboard Music Awards
Artist of the Year: Taylor Swift – New Artist of the Year: Sam Smith – Top Hot 100 Song: All About That Bass – Top Billboard 200 Album: 1989
57th Japan Record Awards
Grand Prix: "Unfair World" (ja) by Sandaime J Soul Brothers from Exile Tribe • Best Singer: Seiko Matsuda • Best New Artist: Magnolia Factory • Best Song: several
2015 Mnet Asian Music Awards
Artist of the Year: Big Bang • Album of the Year: Exodus by Exo • Song of the Year: "Bang Bang Bang" by Big Bang • Best Music Video: Bae Bae by Big Bang
MTV Video Music Awards
Video of the Year: Bad Blood – Best Male Video: Uptown Funk – Best Female Video: Blank Space – Artist to Watch: Fetty Wap
MTV Europe Music Awards
Best Song: Bad Blood – Best Video: Downtown – Best Female: Rihanna – Best Male: Justin Bieber
The 3rd V Chart Awards
Top Male Artist : Vision Wei with By Your Side • Top Female Artist: Jane Zhang with You Are Mine (我是我的) • Top Group: Top Combine with Large Pear (鸭梨大) • Top New Artist: Henry Huo
Rock and Roll Hall of Fame
Inductees: The Paul Butterfield Blues Band • Joan Jett & The Blackhearts • Green Day • Lou Reed • Stevie Ray Vaughan and Double Trouble • Bill Withers
25th Seoul Music Awards
Grand Prize: Exo • Best Album: Time by Beast • Best Song: "Some" by Soyou & Lil Boi • Best New Artist: Red Velvet, Got7, Eddy Kim

== Bands formed ==
- 3776
- 1Punch
- 100 gecs
- Akishibu Project
- April
- Atarashii Gakko!
- Bad Omens
- The Band Camino
- Bastarz
- Beach Bunny
- Beach Weather
- Big Brain
- Billie Idle
- Bish
- Burning Witches
- Bursters
- Camellia Factory
- Camp Cope
- CLC
- Day6
- Dead & Company
- DIA
- Dogleg
- Drug Restaurant
- Earphones
- Ebisu Muscats
- Empath
- Fate Gear
- GFriend
- Glass Beach
- Her's
- Hollywood Vampires
- The Hoopers
- iamnot
- Idol Renaissance
- Iginari Tohoku San
- iKon
- Kolme
- King Gnu
- La PomPon
- Ladybaby
- The Lemon Twigs
- lol
- Magnolia Factory
- Mammoth
- MAP6
- Meet Me at the Altar
- MeloMance
- Mint Green
- Monsta X
- Mrs. Green Apple
- The Murder Capital
- MyB
- Myth & Roid
- N.Flying
- Official Hige Dandism
- Oh My Girl
- Okilly Dokilly
- OxT
- Pasocom Music Club
- The Peggies
- Pentagon
- Playback
- Pretty Brown
- POP
- Porridge Radio
- The Regrettes
- Romeo
- Rubber Soul
- Seventeen
- Slow Pulp
- Snail Mail
- Snuper
- Sora tob sakana
- Starcrawler
- Suchmos
- Tacoyaki Rainbow
- Tautumeitas
- Tokimeki Sendenbu
- TrySail
- Twice
- Unicorn
- UP10TION
- Vanishing Twin
- VAV
- VIXX LR
- Wednesday Campanella
- Whiteeeen
- Ziferblat

== Soloist debuts ==
- Aimyon
- Alina Baraz
- Alessia Cara
- Alex Gonzaga
- Amber
- Anly
- Anne-Marie
- Aurora
- Baek Yerin
- Bea Miller
- Charlie Puth
- Choa
- Daoko
- Daya
- Dean
- Declan McKenna
- Dua Lipa
- Elo
- Elsie
- Halsey
- Horan
- Faouzia
- Ferlyn G
- G2
- Gaeko
- G.Soul
- Goo Hara
- Hailee Steinfeld
- Iñigo Pascual
- Jacob Benedicto
- Jang Hyun-seung
- Jeremy Zucker
- Julien Baker
- Jung Yong-hwa
- Junoflo
- Jonghyun
- Julian Trono
- Kehlani
- Kiiara
- Lee Hongki
- Lizzy
- Mabel
- Marlo Mortel
- Matteo Guidicelli
- Melanie Martinez
- Morissette
- Minah
- Miwoo
- Niel
- Park Jimin
- Patrick Brasca
- Poppy
- Post Malone
- Reol
- Reese Lansangan
- Rita De Guzman
- RM
- Sabrina Carpenter
- Sakura Fujiwara
- Shaun
- Taeyeon
- Wuno
- Lee Tae-il
- Ugly Duck
- Yassi Pressman
- Yezi

== Bands reformed ==
- The 13th Floor Elevators
- The Academy Is...
- A-ha
- Aiden
- Alexisonfire
- Armor for Sleep
- As One
- At the Drive-In
- Bay City Rollers
- The Black Eyed Peas
- Black Grape
- The Bluetones
- Brooks & Dunn
- Busted
- The Corrs
- Daphne and Celeste
- Dashboard Confessional
- Digable Planets
- Disturbed
- Evanescence
- Faithless
- Good Charlotte
- LCD Soundsystem
- Lush
- Matchbook Romance
- The Matches
- Pist.On
- The Promise Ring
- Rainbow
- Royal Trux
- Savatage
- Simply Red
- The Starting Line
- Supertramp
- Symphony Number One
- Thrice
- A Tribe Called Quest
- Underoath
- Ween

== Bands disbanded ==
- 3 Inches of Blood
- Avi Buffalo
- The Black Crowes
- Bloodhound Gang
- Burzum
- California Breed
- Cali Swag District
- CBS Orchestra
- Cobra Starship
- Device
- Eastern Conference Champions
- Erase Errata
- Flesh for Lulu
- Framing Hanley
- Funeral For a Friend
- Goodbye to Gravity
- G.R.L.
- I, the Breather
- James Last Orchestra
- Kill Hannah
- Klaxons
- Maybeshewill
- Mean Creek
- MellowHype
- Mötley Crüe
- Motörhead
- Neutral Milk Hotel
- Noah and the Whale
- Obits
- Odd Future
- The Replacements
- Rise to Remain
- The Rosso Sisters
- Scott Weiland and the Wildabouts
- Sleeper Agent
- Stereo Kicks
- Texas in July
- The Weakerthans

== Deaths ==
=== January ===
- 1 – Matthew Cogley (30), British musician and songwriter (Failsafe).
- 6 – Lance Percival (81), British actor and singer.
- 13
  - Ronnie Ronalde (91), British siffleur and yodeller.
  - Trevor Ward-Davies (70), English bassist (Dave Dee, Dozy, Beaky, Mick & Tich)
- 19 – Ward Swingle (87), American jazz singer (The Swingle Singers).
- 22 – Joan Hinde (81), British trumpet player
- 25 – Demis Roussos (68), Greek singer and musician
- 27 – Margot Moir (55), Scottish-born Australian singer (The Moir Sisters).
- 29 – Danny McCulloch (69), British bassist (Eric Burdon & The Animals).

=== February ===
- 12 – Steve Strange (55), British musician (Visage).
- 16 – Lesley Gore (68), American singer
- 21 – Clark Terry (94), American jazz trumpeter.
- 22 – Erik Amundsen (78), Norwegian jazz upright-bassist.
- 23 – Ron Edgar (68), American rock drummer (The Music Machine)

=== March ===
- 21 – Jørgen Ingmann, (89), Danish guitarist.

=== April ===
- 1
  - Dave Ball (65), British musician (Procol Harum).
  - Sandy Mason (75), American country music singer-songwriter
- 3 – Andrew Porter (86), British organist, music critic, and opera director
- 10 – Ronald Hambleton (97), English-born Canadian broadcaster and music critic (Toronto Star).
- 13 – Ronnie Carroll (80), Northern Irish singer
- 14 – Percy Sledge (74), American soul, gospel and R&B singer
- 17 – Brian Couzens (86), British music industry executive (Chandos Records).
- 18 – Ben E. King (76), American soul and R&B singer

=== May ===
- 6
  - Errol Brown (71), British-Jamaican singer (Hot Chocolate)
  - Dottie Dillard (91), American pop singer (The Anita Kerr Quartet)
- 14 – B.B. King (89), American blues guitarist.
- 20 – Bob Belden (58), American jazz saxophonist.
- 23 – Marcus Belgrave (78), American jazz trumpeter.
- 31 – Slim Richey (77), American jazz guitarist.

=== June ===
- 11 – Ornette Coleman (85), American jazz saxophonist.
- 12 – Monica Lewis (93), American singer and actress.
- 21 – Gunther Schuller (89), American composer, conductor, and horn player.
- 27 – Joe Bennett (75), American rock and roll singer, songwriter, and guitarist (Joe Bennett & the Sparkletones)

=== July ===
- 1
  - Val Doonican (88), Irish-born singer.
  - Edward Greenfield (86), British music critic and broadcaster.
- 13 – Eric Wrixon (68), British musician from Belfast, Northern Ireland (Them, Thin Lizzy).
- 22
  - Daron Norwood (49), American country music singer
  - Eddie Hardin (66), British singer-songwriter and pianist (The Spencer Davis Group and Axis Point).
- 30 – Lynn Anderson (67), American country singer
- 31 – Pamela Brandt (68), American country-rock bassist, singer and songwriter (The Deadly Nightshade)

=== August ===
- 1 – Cilla Black (72), British singer and presenter.
- 12 – John Scott (59), British organist and choirmaster.
- 14 – Jazz Summers (71), British music manager (Scissor Sisters, The Verve, Snow Patrol), (lung cancer)
- 20 – Laurent Rossi (67), French singer, songwriter, and record producer (Bimbo Jet)

=== September ===
- 4 – Hal Willis (82), Canadian country music singer
- 13 – Gary Richrath (65), American guitarist (REO Speedwagon)
- 29 – Phil Woods (83), American jazz saxophonist, clarinetist, bandleader and composer

=== October ===
- 8 – Jim Diamond, Scottish singer (Ph.D.)
- 9 – Larry Rosen (75), American drummer, entrepreneur, and music producer.
- 10 – Steve Mackay (66) American Saxophonist (The Stooges)
- 11 – Carey Lander, Scottish keyboardist (Camera Obscura)
- 20 – Cory Wells (74), American singer (Three Dog Night)
- 22 – Mark Murphy (83), American singer.
- 28 – Diane Charlemagne (51), English dance singer (52nd Street, Urban Cookie Collective)

=== November ===
- 5 – Nora Brockstedt, Norwegian singer (92).
- 25 – Svein Christiansen, Norwegian drummer (74).

=== December ===
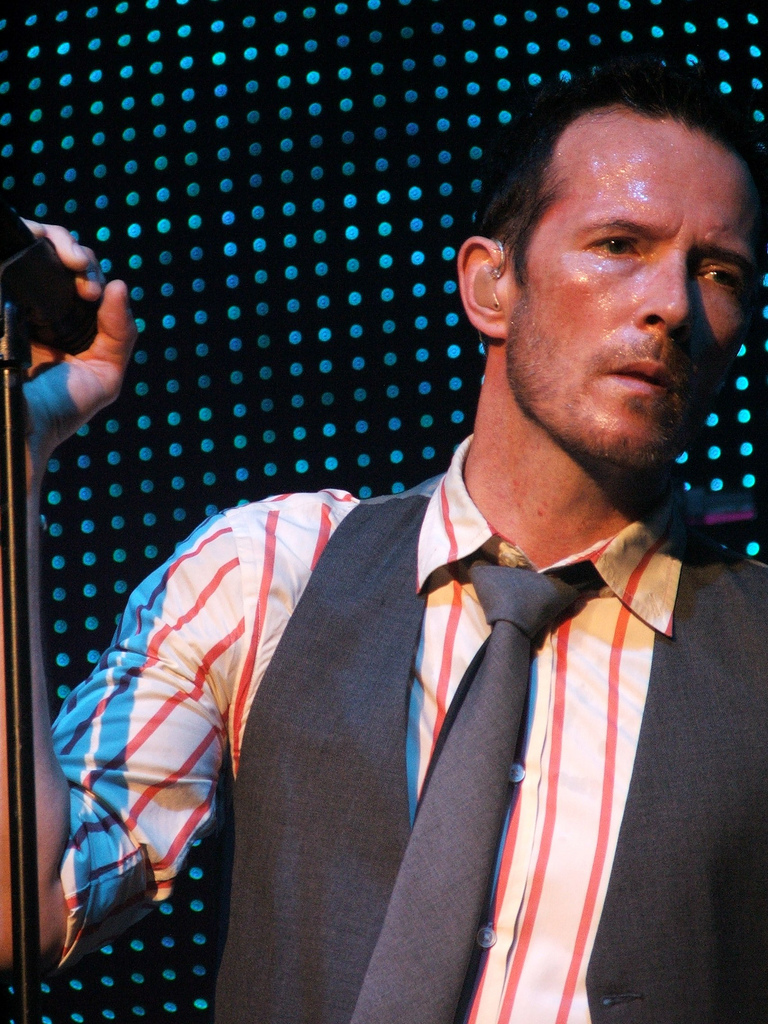
Scott Weiland on stage—2009-07

- 3 – Scott Weiland (48), American musician, singer and songwriter (Stone Temple Pilots, Velvet Revolver and Art of Anarchy)
- 28
  - Guru Josh (51), acid house DJ
  - Ian "Lemmy" Kilmister (70), English musician, singer and songwriter (Motörhead, Hawkwind, The Rockin' Vickers)
- 30 – Zjef Vanuytsel (70), Belgian folk singer.
- 31 – Natalie Cole (65), American singer, songwriter, and actress (congestive heart failure).

== See also ==
- Once Upon a Time in Shaolin
- Timeline of musical events
- Women in music
