= Rabah Donquishoot =

Rabah Ourrad
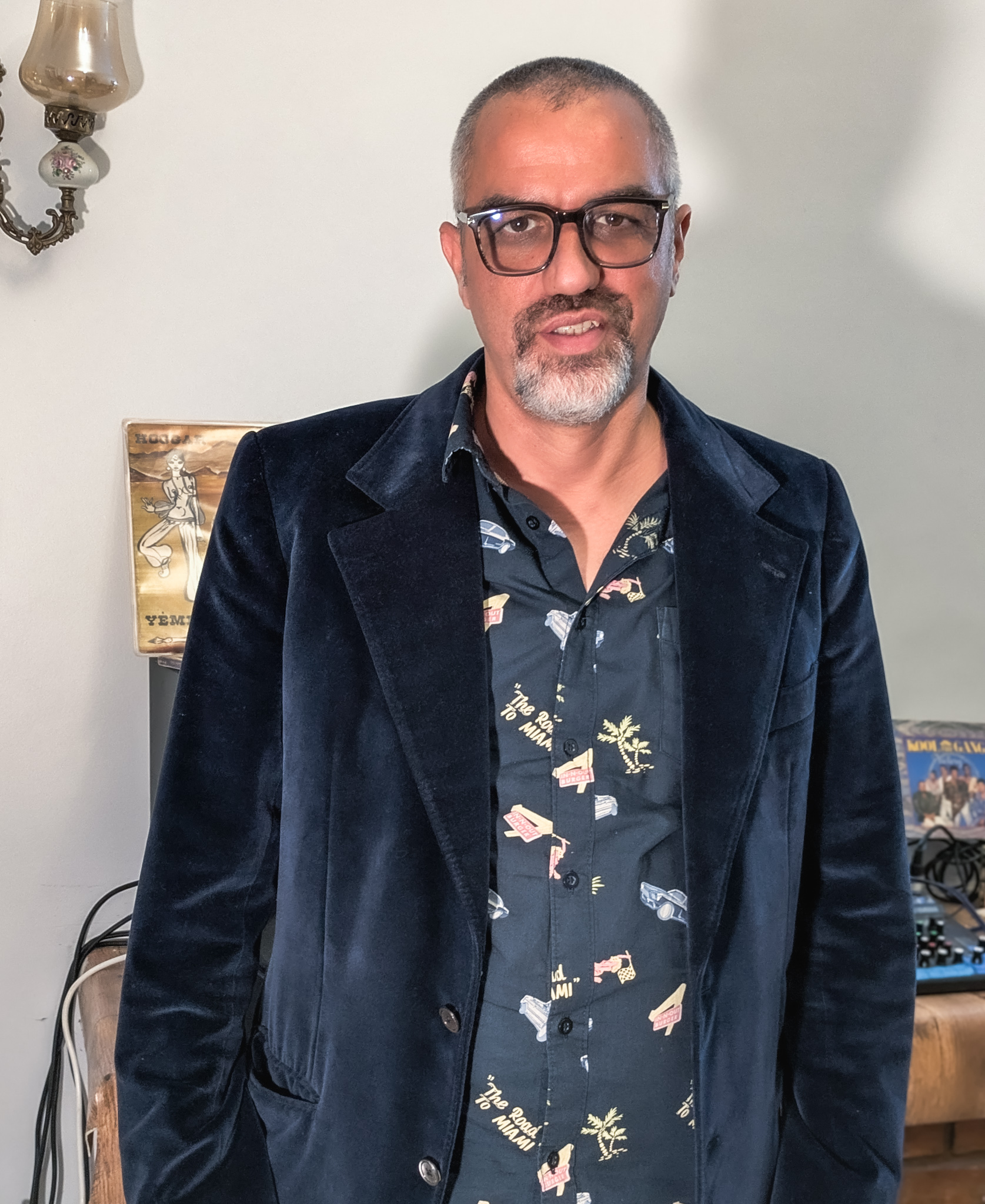
- Rabah Donquishoot 2026

Background information
- Also known as: Rabah Donquishoot
- Born: Rabah Ourrad; 1977 (age 48–49); Algeria
- Origin: Algeria
- Genres: Rap
- Occupations: Rapper, chef
- Years active: 1990s–present
- Member of: MBS (Le Micro Brise le Silence)

Rabah Ourrad, known by Rabah Donquishoot, is an Algerian rapper and chef. Active since the 1990s, he is recognized for his social and political engagement within the rap group MBS (Le Micro Brise le Silence) and for his solo projects.

== Biography ==
Rabah Ourrad joined the underground music scene in 1994. He became a member of MBS, a collective of Algerian rap, according to RFI. His music reflects the struggles of Algerian youth and carries a message of protest against injustice.

Beyond his musical career, Rabah pursued culinary internships to become a chef.

== Solo discography ==
After gaining fame with the group MBS, Rabah Donquishoot embarked on a solo career, releasing several albums exploring personal and social themes with a sharp and poetic style.

- 2002: Djabha Gagnant
- 2003: Galouli
- 2004: Rabah President
- 2009: Dernier Cri
- 2015: Psychotrip

These albums reinforced his influence on the Algerian rap scene and demonstrated continuity in his artistic engagement.

== Influence and legacy ==
Rabah Donquishoot, who has tried as a rap artist to denounce injustices and to serve freedom of expression, has embodied the model of versatility and perseverance. This has been something he has wanted to demonstrate, thereby transforming his passion for emancipation. He has also worked as a chef.
