= Laissez-passer (disambiguation) =

A laissez-passer (French, literally 'let pass' or 'let it go') is a type of travel document.

Laissez-passer may also refer to:

- "Laissez passer (song)", by Maître Gims, 2015
- Safe Conduct (French: Laissez-passer), a 2002 French historical drama film
- Laissez-faire is a type of economic system
