= Monroe (singer) =

French-American singer

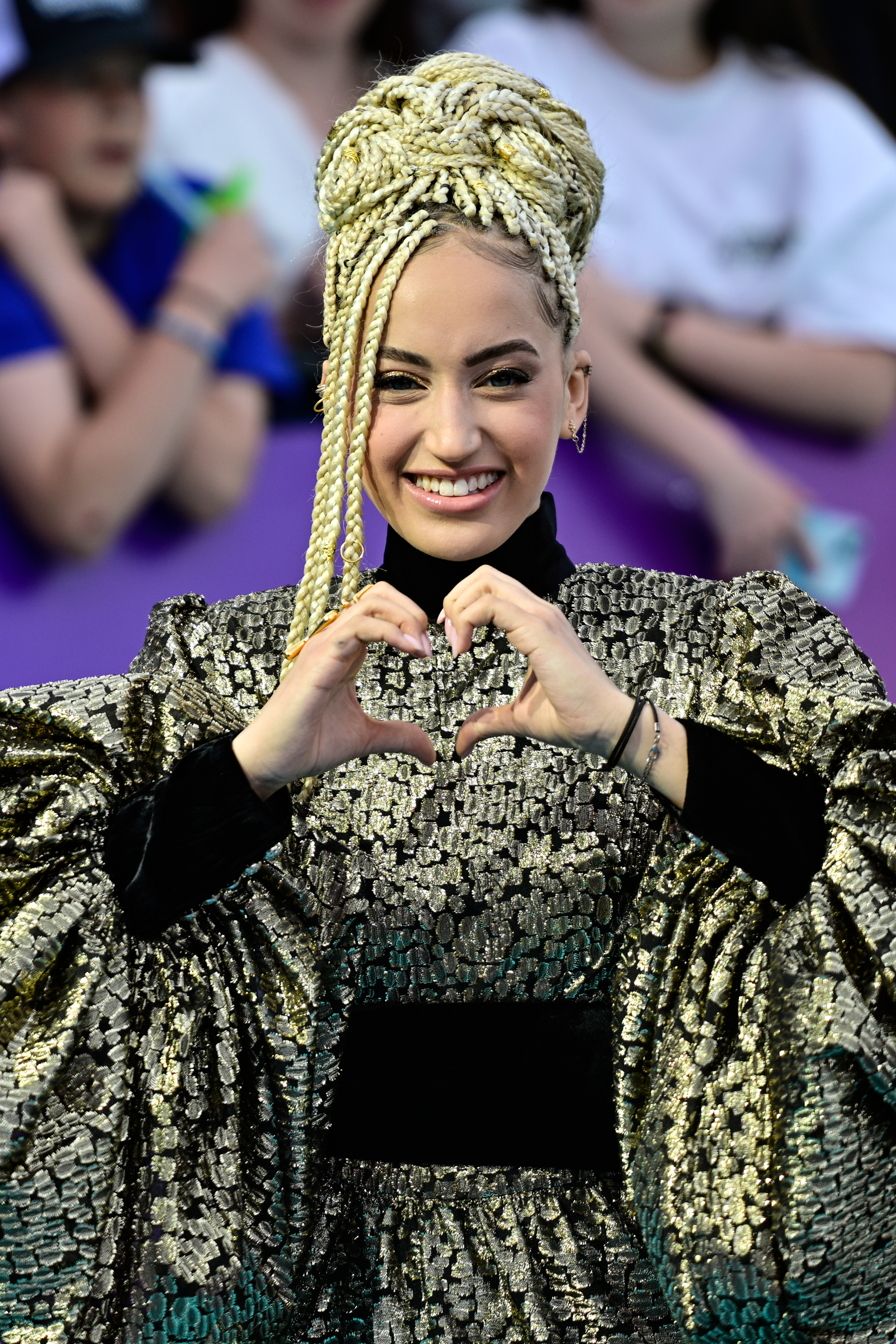
- Monroe in 2026

Background information
- Born: Monroe Vata Rigby; 19 November 2008 (age 18); Salt Lake City, Utah, U.S.
- Genre: Operatic pop
- Occupation: Singer
- Labels: Warner Classics; Parlophone

Monroe Vata Rigby (born 19 November 2008), known mononymously as Monroe, is a French and American soprano singer. She represented France in the Eurovision Song Contest 2026 with the song "Regarde!", finishing in eleventh place. She also has performed with Josh Groban, on "Hymne à l'amour".

== Early life ==
Rigby was born to Micah and Martine Rigby, the latter of whom moved to France from the Democratic Republic of the Congo. Both of her parents are members of the Church of Jesus Christ of Latter-day Saints. She has four older brothers. Having spent her childhood in the United States, Rigby began singing at an early age. As a child, she sang in the church choir, where she discovered her interest in classical music. She then received vocal training and also learned to play the piano.

== Career ==
From December 2024 to January 2025, Rigby competed in the eleventh season of the French TV series Prodiges. She won the competition, in which she was also awarded a scholarship worth €10 thousand. As a result, she signed with Warner Classics and released her debut studio album Monroe, which features a mix of arias and crossover favorites, on 28 November 2025.

On 2 March 2026, multiple French outlets reported that Monroe had been selected as the French entrant for the Eurovision Song Contest 2026, which would later be confirmed on 6 March, with the broadcaster France Télévisions also unveiling her entry, "Regarde !". She placed 11th with 158 points. She was the last minor to perform in the contest before the EBU announced that the minimum participation age would be raised to 18 starting in 2027.

== Discography ==
Credits taken from Apple Music.

=== Studio albums ===
Title	Details	Peak chart positions	
Title	Details	FRA	FRA Classic
Monroe	Released: 28 November 2025; Label: Warner Classics, Parlophone; Formats: Digital download, streaming	153	1

=== Singles ===
Title	Year	Album
"O mio babbino caro"	2025	Monroe
"Ave Maria" (Christmas version)	2025	Monroe
"Regarde !"	2026	Non-album single

Awards and achievements
Preceded by Louane with "Maman"	France in the Eurovision Song Contest; 2026	Succeeded by TBA
