= L'École des stars =

- Presented by: Laurie Cholewa
- Judges: Bruno Berberes (2008, 2009); Nathalie Corré (2008); Maureen Dor; Various guest judges
- Original language: French
- No. of series: 2

Production
- Production company: Endemol France

Original release
- Network: Direct 8
- Release: 11 November 2008 – 25 December 2009

L’École des stars was a French music competition and reality television series first broadcast in 2008 with a second series in 2009, both on Direct 8 television station, designed to find great child singers aged 8 to 12 years. Presenter for both seasons was Laurie Cholewa. The winner for the first season was Valentin and for the second season Léo Rispal.

== Season 1 (2008) ==
The first season debuted on 11 November 2008 and continued till 16 December 2008. Episodes were broadcast at 20:40 on Tuesdays. There were 50 participants, from which ten were selected then five, then the winner. The winner of this series was 11-year-old Valentin. The permanent jury was composed of Nathalie Corré and Bruno Berberes and joined by guest artist / juries that changed from episode to episode including Natasha St-Pier, Roch Voisine, Patrick Fiori, Julie Zenatti and Gilbert Montagné. Another participant in the show was Louane.

== Season 2 (2009) ==
The second season of L'École des stars started on 20 November 2009 and finished on 25 December 2009. Episodes were broadcast at 20:40 on Fridays. There were 32 participants after a national casting in which more than 2000 children applied. From the 32 candidates, ten were selected and then four finalists, then the winner. The winner of this series was the 9-year-old Léo Rispal. The permanent jury was composed of Maureen Dor and Bruno Berberes with invited artist / juries that changed from episode to episode including Sofia Essaïdi, Hélène Ségara, Didier Barbelivien, Amandine Bourgeois, Dany Brillant and Tina Arena. Guest performing artists were Sliimy, Emmanuel Moire, Rose, Amaury Vassili, La troupe de Mozart and Peps.
