= 2015 in Indian music =

== Events ==
- January - Shekhar Sen receives a Padma Shri Award in the field of the Arts from the Indian Government.

== Albums ==
- Vijay Iyer Trio - Break Stuff

== Deaths ==
- 4 January - Chitresh Das, Kathak dance instructor and choreographer, 70
- 28 January - Mala Aravindan, actor and singer, 76
- 20 March - Shahir Krishnarao Sable, Marathi folk singer-songwriter, 92

== See also ==
- 2015 in music
- List of albums released in 2015
