= Léo Rispal =

French singer

- Born: Léo Rispal; 3 August 2000 (age 26); Roanne, France
- Occupation: Singer
- Years active: 2008–present

Léo Rispal (born 3 August 2000 in Roanne) is a French child singer and winner of second season of the French reality television series L'École des stars broadcast in 2009 with the final broadcast on 25 December 2009 on French television station Direct 8.

== On L'École des stars ==
He became known through his YouTube videos singing covers of various artists. Then he applied to the competition L'École des stars during which he sang:

- 4th episode (qualification round):
  - "Somewhere Over the Rainbow" from Judy Garland
  - "Le Manège" from Stanislas
- Semi-final:
  - "Mon amie la rose" from Françoise Hardy
  - "Perhaps, Perhaps, Perhaps" from Doris Day
- Final:
  - "Le temps qui court" from Alain Chamfort
  - "Heart of Glass" from Blondie

== After L'École des stars ==
After his win, he decided to go solo with a prospective album. In 2010, 500 choristes chantent Noël on French main station TF1, in addition to 2 appearances in 2010 and 2011 in Le Grand Show des Enfants. He also took part in charity concert Autisme V.I.E.S. singing Lady Gaga's "Telephone", also "Mon amie la rose" and his single "Le même que moi".

In 2011, he was featured in Gary Fico single "Le même que moi" taken from Fico's album Funambule, finding success on the charts reaching No. 18 in its peak position on the French Singles Chart and staying for 18 weeks in the charts.

In 2014, He participated rising star . He moved the jury and the public but was eliminated in the second half because of Larry Lynch.

== Discography ==
- 2011: "Le même que moi" (Gary Fico featuring Léo Rispal) (reaching No. 18 on the French Singles Chart)
- 2012: "J'veux du soleil"
- 2012: "EP – Leo Rispal" ("Last Christmas", "Andy Warhol", "J'veux du soleil", "1,2,3")
