= Maman (2015 song) =

2015 single by Louane

Single by Louane

from the album Chambre 12
- Released: 30 November 2015
- Genre: French pop
- Length: 2:52
- Songwriters: Yohann Malory; Tristan Salvati
- Producer: Dan Black

Louane singles chronology
"Nos secrets" (2015)	"Maman" (2015)	"Tourne" (2016)

"Maman" (lit. 'mum') is a song by French singer Louane. It was written by Yohann Malory and Tristan Salvati, with production handled by Dan Black. The single was released on 30 November 2015 as the fifth single from her debut studio album Chambre 12 (2015). The song is dedicated to her late mother, who died in April 2014.

On 15 March 2025, the song was delisted from streaming platforms in favour of another song with the same title, with which Louane represented France in the Eurovision Song Contest 2025. She commented: “It's a sequel, of course. There are a few words in common between the two, but they're two different songs. For the first time, I'm finally well. And this new song exists for that reason. I'd like it to be the only thing we remember, rather than dwelling on the past."

== Charts ==
=== Weekly charts ===
Weekly chart performance for "Maman"
Chart (2015–17)	Peak position
Belgium (Ultratop 50 Wallonia)	11
France (SNEP)	18
