= No (Louane song) =

Single by Louane

from the album Louane
- Released: May 25, 2018
- Genre: Power pop
- Length: 3:23
- Label: Mercury
- Songwriter(s): Patxi Garat; Loïc Nottet
- Producer(s): Dan Black

Louane singles chronology
"Immobile" (2018)	"No" (2018)	"Midi sur novembre" (2018)

Music video
- No on YouTube

"No" is a song by French singer Louane from debut studio her-self album (2017). "No" received a commercial release solely in France and Wallonia, where it charted at numbers 88 and 26, respectively.

== Charts ==
Chart (2018)	Peak position
Belgium (Ultratop 50 Wallonia)	26
France Singles Sales Chart (SNEP)	88

== Certifications ==
Region	Certification	Certified units/sales
France (SNEP)	Platinum	200,000^{‡}
^{‡} Sales+streaming figures based on certification alone.
