= 2015 in Irish music =

This article lists various songs, albums, festivals, and performances of the year 2015 in Irish music.

== Events ==
- 23 May - Molly Sterling represents Ireland in the Eurovision Song Contest 2015 with the song "Playing with Numbers".

== Albums ==
- Nathan Carter - Beautiful Life
- HamsandwicH - Stories from the Surface
- Kodaline - Coming Up for Air
- Villagers - Darling Arithmetic

== Singles ==
- Rob Smith - "Dale Boca Juniors"

== Deaths ==
- 5 March – Jim McCann, 70, folk musician, throat cancer.
- 11 March – Tony Fenton, 53, radio presenter and DJ, prostate cancer.
- 13 April – Ronnie Carroll, 80, Northern Irish singer and political candidate.
- 27 May – Dennis Sheehan, 68, Irish music tour manager (U2), heart attack.
- 1 July – Val Doonican, 88, singer and television personality.

== See also ==
- 2015 in music
- Music of Ireland
