= Jour 1 =

Single by Louane

from the album Chambre 12
- Released: March 24, 2014
- Genre: French pop
- Length: 3:36
- Songwriter: Patxi Garat
- Producer: Dan Black

Louane singles chronology
"Jour 1" (2014)	"Avenir" (2014)

"Jour 1" is the debut single by French singer and actress Louane, and the lead single from her debut studio album Chambre 12.

Jour 1 is about two young lovers that just keep coming back to each other.

== Charts ==
=== Weekly charts ===
Chart (2014–2015)	Peak position
Belgium (Ultratip Bubbling Under Flanders)	49
Belgium (Ultratop 50 Wallonia)	2
France (SNEP)	6
Switzerland (Schweizer Hitparade)	49
Switzerland (Media Control Romandy)	6

=== Year-end charts ===
Chart (2015)	Position
Belgium (Ultratop Wallonia)	9
France (SNEP)	20

=== Certifications ===
Region	Certification	Certified units/sales
Belgium (BRMA)	Gold	10,000^{‡}
France (SNEP)	Gold	75,000^{*}
^{*} Sales figures based on certification alone.^{‡} Sales+streaming figures based on certification alone.
