= Open Season (Une autre saison) =

Single by Josef Salvat
- Released: 3 May 2015
- Genre: Pop
- Length: 4:04
- Songwriter(s): Josef Salvat, Rich Cooper, Laurent Lescarret
- Producer(s): Rich Cooper

"Open Season (Une autre saison)" is a song by Josef Salvat released in 2015.

== Charts ==
Chart (2015)	Peak position
Belgium (Ultratop 50 Wallonia)	8
France (SNEP)	10
