= Brisé (song) =

Single by Maître Gims

from the album Mon cœur avait raison
- Released: 24 August 2015
- Genre: R&B, Electropop
- Length: 3:37
- Songwriters: Maître Gims, Renaud Rebillaud

Music video
- "Brisé" on YouTube

"Brisé" (English: Shattered) is a song by Congolese singer and rapper Maître Gims from the album Mon cœur avait raison.

== Charts ==
=== Weekly charts ===
Chart (2015)	Peak position
Belgium (Ultratop 50 Wallonia)	5
France (SNEP)	6

=== Year-end charts ===
Chart (2015)	Position
Belgium (Ultratop Wallonia)	90
