= L.E.J =

French band

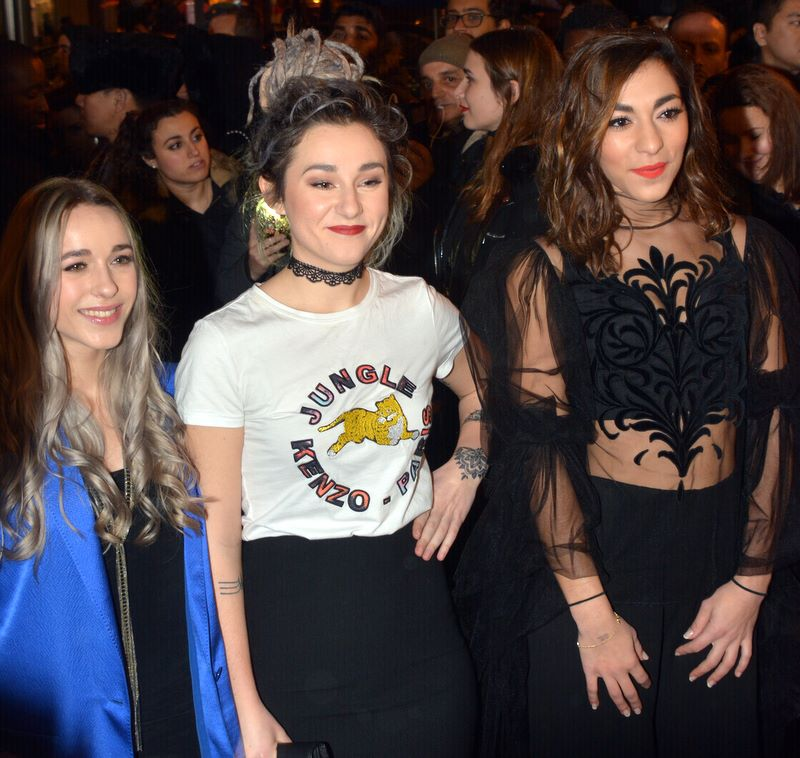
- The members of L.E.J. in 2017 at the Globes de Cristal Awards ceremony. From left to right: Elisa Paris, Juliette Saumagne, Lucie Lebrun

Background information
- Origin: Saint-Denis, Île-de-France, France
- Genres: Pop; orchestral pop; art pop; classical; Anime song; VGM
- Years active: 2013–present
- Labels: Suther Kane Films; Mercury; Universal
- Members: Lucie Lebrun; Elisa Paris; Juliette Saumagne

L.E.J, short for Lucie, Élisa and Juliette, sometimes Elijay, is a French band composed of three women are Lucie Lebrun (lead and background vocals, synthesizers, sampler, saxophone), Elisa Paris (lead and background vocals, drums, percussion), and Juliette Saumagne (background vocals, cello, bass) from Saint-Denis, a city in Paris' suburbs. They became famous by condensing numerous top songs from the summer of 2015 into a mashup performance. Their song mashup Summer 2015 had millions of plays on YouTube as of August 2015 and was thus a global hit in less than a month. Their music is based on classical and world music, described by MTV reviewer Joseph Lamour as "eclectic". According to Seventeen magazine, the three vocalists have been best friends since childhood, and have been performing together since 2013. Reviewer Hannah Orenstein described their sound as "pared-down but strong." Juliette plays the cello and sings backups while Elisa and Lucie are the main singers.

== History ==
=== Beginnings ===
All three members were born in 1993: Lucie on 21 November, Elisa on 26 August, and Juliette on 3 September. They are childhood friends from Saint Denis, and have known each other since they were toddlers. Their passion has always been music: Juliette studied cello at the Conservatoire de Saint-Denis, and Lucie and Elisa studied vocal technique at the Maîtrise de Radio France, a prestigious French singing school, acquiring solid classical training. Lucie Lebrun also plays the piano and the saxophone, and Elisa Paris plays the piano and the harp.

In October 2013, they competed in a contest organized by the French band Tryo, covering one of their songs with vocal harmonies. It was the first time they had all sung together as a band. They won the contest and got to perform for a large audience; at that point, according to one source, the group did not yet have a name. They decided to go on with the band and kept posting videos on their YouTube channel, covering various artists and posting their first summer mashup in 2014. To a large extent, the group connected with listeners through social networks.

They signed a contract with Live Nation Entertainment, and started opening for artists in France, such as Grand Corps Malade. On 22 June 2015, they played as the opening act for Pharrell Williams in Monaco.

=== Summer 2015 and their first album ===
On 1 August 2015, they posted a mashup of 11 worldwide hits of 2015, Summer 2015. It was an immediate success, getting hundreds of thousands of views within two days. On 3 August, Time magazine shared their mashup which launched a craze around the video and brought them millions of views on YouTube in less than a month. French and international media took an immediate interest in the three young women, who were a bit overwhelmed by this unanticipated turn of events. Indeed, they had never intended their video to have such an impact and had not foreseen such a success. Elisa said in an interview that the women would not have worn their pajamas when recording Summer 2015 if they had known that the video would go viral.

In December 2015, L.E.J released their first album, entitled En attendant l'album, which contains 11 tracks, all cover songs but La Dalle, their first original composition. This collection includes a cover of Hanging Tree, the song from the Hunger Games: Mockingjay Part 1. L.E.J also performed Hanging Tree at the 9 November 2015 Paris Premiere of Hunger Games: Mockingjay Part 2.

=== 2016: A year on the road ===
During 2016, L.E.J went on concert tours, both in France and abroad. The tour of France began on 27 May, when they played at Paris's Olympia Hall. During that time, they also went to Canada (they played in Montréal on 14 March) and to the United States (they performed at the South By Southwest Festival and in New York City). In the summer, they toured French festivals, including playing in front of tens of thousands of people at Main Square Festival, and in the fanzone of Saint-Denis for the final of the UEFA Euro 2016. They went back on tour in the fall of 2016, kicking it off with 3 sold-out concerts at the Olympia Hall on 21, 22 October, and 23rd, and ending the tour with a last concert in Rennes on 13 December. They also performed at the closing ceremony of the Cannes Film Festival on 22 May 2016, with French musician Ibrahim Maalouf. In total, L.E.J played around a 100 concerts in the year 2016.

On 4 August 2016, they posted Summer 2016 on YouTube, which is a mashup of 2016's hits, the same way they had done in 2015. It contained 23 songs and got more than 5 million views.

In September 2016, their second original composition, Le Verbe, was released on YouTube. It features Dave Crowe from Heymoonshaker, and the video was shot in the form of an advertising spot for Audi.

In December 2016, they released an EP entitled Christmas Hors d'oeuvre that contained three tracks. Game Of Bells is a medley of Carol of the Bells and the soundtrack for the TV show Game of Thrones; the video for the song is a giant Christmas-themed Mannequin Challenge. It got one million views in about a week, and made it into the New York Times' Christmas playlist. The EP also contains Little Drummer Boy, which is a medley of the Christmas carol Little Drummer Boy and Rihanna's Man Down, and a cover of The Sound Of Silence, by Simon and Garfunkel.

On 10 February 2017, the band won the award for Stage Revelation at the 32nd Victoires de la Musique ceremony, a French award ceremony that recognizes achievements in the music industry. It is the French equivalent of the Grammy Awards.

They toured French festivals in the summer of 2017, presenting a newly arranged show.

Their first original album was originally announced for 2017, but due mainly to their tour, the band postponed it to early 2018. It will be composed of songs the three women will write, mostly in French, and they expressed feeling tremendous pressure not to disappoint anybody. Paris said that recording this album would be the band's greatest challenge. In an interview they gave to Purecharts, the women of L.E.J said they were proud of their work so far. They teased the new album, explaining that some songs will be a lot more produced than previous tracks, with a greater exploitation of Juliette's cello.

=== 2018: First original album ===
They announced their upcoming original album for March/April 2018. In January, they toured Australia for three shows in Adelaide, Melbourne and Sydney as part of the French acts of the 2018 So Frenchy So Chic in the Park Festival. They were well received by both audiences and press reviews.

The first single "La Nuit" was released on 6 April 2018.

== Discography ==
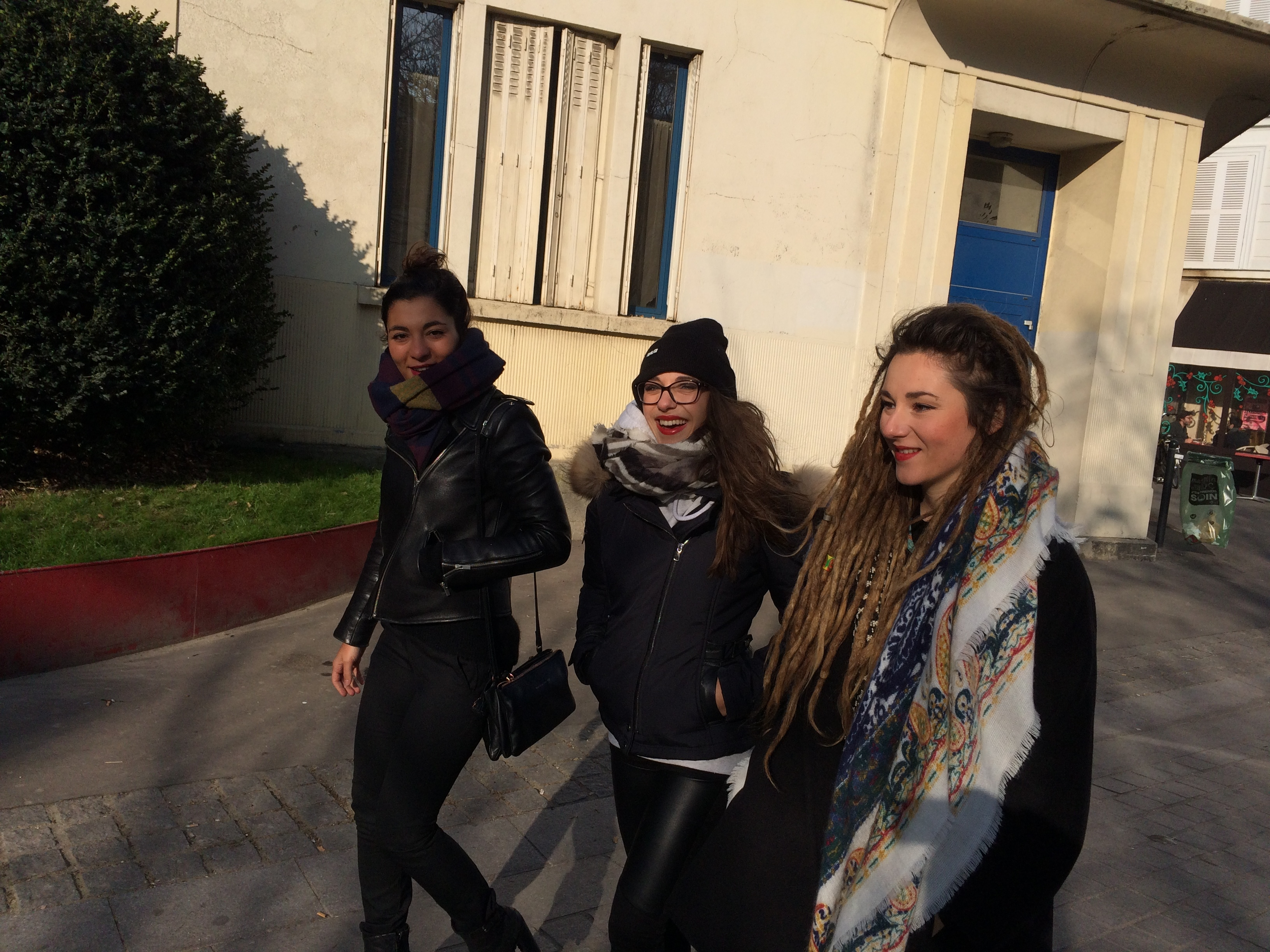
The group members on the streets of Saint-Denis

=== Albums ===
Year	Title	Peak positions			Certification
Year	Title	FRA	BEL (Wa)	SWI	Certification
2015	En attendant l'album...	4	26	39	2× Platinum (French certified)
2018	Poupées russes	5	16	21	
2020	Pas peur	11	25	54	
2022	Vol. II	72	124	—	

=== EPs ===
Year	Title
2016	Christmas Hors d'Oeuvre

=== Singles ===
Year	Title	Peak positions	Certification
Year	Title	FRA	Certification
2015	"Summer 2015"	1	
2015	"Summer 2014"	46	
2015	"Seine-Saint-Denis Style"	91	
2015	"Hip Hop Mash Up"	39	
2015	"Hanging Tree"	99	
2016	"Summer 2016"	5	
2016	"Game of Bells"	184	
2018	La Nuit		Poupées Russes

=== Other charted songs ===
Year	Title	Peak positions	Album
Year	Title	FRA	Album
2015	"Get Lucky"	196	En attendant l'album
2015	"La dalle"	163	En attendant l'album

=== Summer series ===
- 2014: "Summer 2014"
- 2015: "Summer 2015"
- 2016: "Summer 2016"
- 2017: "Summer 2017"
- 2018: "Summer 2018"
- 2019: "Summer 2019"
- 2020: "Summer 2020"
- 2021: "Summer 2021"
- 2023: "Summer 2023"
- 2024: "Summer 2024"
- 2025: "Summer 2025: The Last Summer"

== Awards and nominations ==
=== Awards ===
- Melty Future Awards 2016: Female Coming Soon
- Victoires de la Musique 2017: Stage Revelation

=== Nominations ===
- NRJ Music Awards 2015: Best French Band/Duo of the Year
- NRJ Music Awards 2016: Best Francophone Band/Duo of the Year
- Femmes En Or 2016: Women of Music
- Globes de Cristal 2017: Best Female Artist
