= Mon cœur avait raison =

Studio album by Maître Gims
- Released: 28 August 2015
- Recorded: 2014–2015
- Labels: Wati B, Jive Records

Maître Gims chronology
Subliminal (2013)	Mon cœur avait raison (2015)	Ceinture noire (2018)

Singles from Mon cœur avait raison
- 1. "Est-ce que tu m'aimes?" Released: 27 April 2015; 2. "Melynda Gates" Released: 21 June 2015; 3. "Laissez passer" Released: 22 June 2015; 4. "Longue vie" Released: 22 July 2015; 5. "Brisé" Released: 24 August 2015; 6. "Sapés comme jamais" Released: 19 October 2015; 7. "ABCD" Released: 30 October 2015; 8. "Tu vas me manquer" Released: 11 December 2015; 9. "Je te pardonne" Released: 18 March 2016; 10. "Ma beauté" Released: 3 June 2016; 11. "150" Released: 27 July 2016; 12. "Tout donner" Released: 11 November 2016; 13. "Loin" Released: 13 March 2017

Mon cœur avait raison (French: [mɔ̃ kœʁ‿avɛ ʁɛzɔ̃]; lit. 'My heart was right') is a 2015 double album by Congolese–French singer and rapper Maître Gims. Released on 28 August 2015, the album is divided into Pilule bleue ("blue pill"), containing 15 tracks and Pilule rouge ("red pill"), containing 11.

== Genesis ==
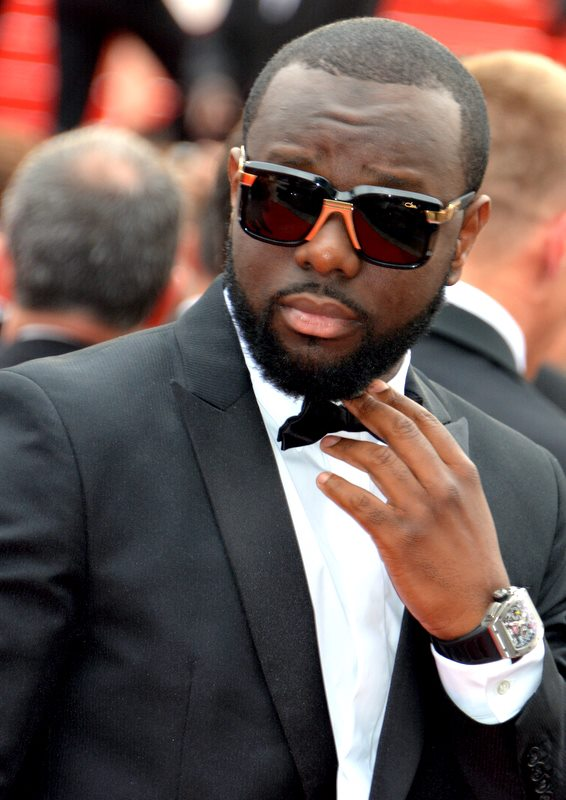
Gims at the 2016 Cannes Film Festival.

In parallel with the announcement of his Warano Tour, Maître Gims published videos via social networks with extracts of songs that turned out to be those of his future album. In addition, he announces the release on 20 February 2016 of the seventh video of This is not a clip with Fuck Ramses which could not take place.

Although announced for the month of March, the release of the first single from the album "Est-ce que tu m'aimes?" took place on 28 April on Skyrock. In addition, he announces that the album will be divided into two parts: the Blue Pill which is a part made up of urban pop songs, and the Red Pill which is oriented towards rap. This concept was inspired by the movie The Matrix. Some time later, the first single from The Red Pill titled "Melynda Gates" followed by a clip is released. Then, Gims unveils the second extract of the Blue Pill called "Laissez passer", the clip of which brings together his family, his father and his brothers.

At the end of July, Maître Gims continues with "Longue vie" (Red Pill) with Lefa which marks his return to the music scene, the clip brings together all the Sexion d'Assaut. The tracklist and the release date of the album are announced by Maître Gims on social networks: the album will be released on 28 August. At the end of August, a new single: "Brisé", is available. Subsequently, he released 4 other singles from his double album ("Tu vas me manquer", "Je te pardonne", "ABCD" as well as "Sapés comme jamais"). Then he announced the reissue of his album which will be released on 26 August 2016.

== Reception ==
The album was well received and after having counted nearly 85,800 records sold for its first week, it was certified platinum. At the end of 2018, more than 700,000 units had been sold in France and 581,000 units had been sold internationally.

== Track listing ==
=== Pilule bleue ===
No.	Title	Producer(s)	Length
1.	"Intro"	Gims; Sia	1:29
2.	"Brisé"	Gims; Murda Beatz	3:37
3.	"Est-ce que tu m'aimes?"	Gims	3:56
4.	"Contradiction" (featuring Barack Adama)	Gims; Barack Adama	3:40
5.	"Hasta Luego"	Gims; Bobby Kritical; DJ Plugg	3:28
6.	"Habibi"	Gims	3:33
7.	"Je te pardonne"	Gims	4:05
8.	"Laissez passer"	Gims	4:25
9.	"Number One" (featuring H-Magnum)	Gims; H-Magnum	3:38
10.	"Mon cœur avait raison"	Gims; Qolorsound	4:02
11.	"Sapés comme jamais" (featuring Chinx & Niska)	Gims; Niska	3:26
12.	"Cadeaux"	Gims	4:11
13.	"Sans rétro" (featuring Dadju)	Gims; Dadju	3:58
14.	"Tu vas me manquer"	Gims; Murda Beatz; Cubeatz; 40	4:10
15.	"Je te pardonne" (featuring Sia)	Gims; Sia	3:33
Total length:			55:12

=== Pilule rouge ===
No.	Title	Producer(s)	Length
1.	"Intro" (Dawala & Sexion d'Assaut)	Gims; Wisla; Renaud Rebillaud; Wati B	1:44
2.	"ABCD"	Gims; Dany Synthé	2:55
3.	"Melynda Gates"	Gims; Dany Synthé; DJ Spinz	3:16
4.	"Longue vie" (featuring Lefa)	Gims; Renaud Rebillaud	4:37
5.	"Angelina" (featuring Laurent Twins)	Gims; Stan-E	3:04
6.	"Uzi" (featuring JR O Crom & Doomams)	Gims; Dany Synthé	4:23
7.	"Richard Mille" (featuring Insolent)	Gims; Stan-E; Yalatif Beatz	4:31
8.	"La main du roi"	Gims; Yalatif Beatz	2:30
9.	"Sofitelo"	Gims; Dany Synthé	4:08
10.	"Mayweather" (featuring Djuna Family)	Gims; Dany Synthé	4:48
11.	"Le barillet"	Gims; Stan-E	4:31
Total length:			38:59

=== Reissue ===
À contrecœur
No.	Title	Producer(s)	Length
1.	"Est-ce que tu m'aimes?"	Gims; Renaud Rebillaud	3:57
2.	"Longue vie" (featuring Lefa)	Gims; Renaud Rebillaud	4:36
3.	"Brisé"	Gims; Renaud Rebillaud	3:38
4.	"Number One" (featuring H Magnum)	Gims; Renaud Rebillaud	3:39
5.	"Hasta Luego"	Gims; Renaud Rebillaud	3:28
6.	"Mayweather" (featuring Djuna Family)	Gims; Dany Synthé	4:48
7.	"Je te pardonne [Sia Remix]" (featuring Sia)	Gims; Renaud Rebillaud	3:33
8.	"Sapés comme jamais" (featuring Niska)	Gims; Dany Synthé	3:27
9.	"ABCD"	Gims; Dany Synthé	2:55
Total length:			1:12:00

== Charts ==
=== Weekly charts ===
Chart (2015)	Peak position
Belgian Albums (Ultratop Flanders)	24
Belgian Albums (Ultratop Wallonia)	1
Dutch Albums (Album Top 100)	40
French Albums (SNEP)	1
Swiss Albums (Schweizer Hitparade)	3

Chart (2016)	Peak position
Danish Albums (Hitlisten)	4
Italian Albums (FIMI)	20

=== Year-end charts ===
Chart (2015)	Position
Belgian Albums (Ultratop Wallonia)	12
French Albums (SNEP)	6
Swiss Albums (Schweizer Hitparade)	90
Chart (2016)	Position
Belgian Albums (Ultratop Wallonia)	8
Danish Albums (Hitlisten)	19
French Albums (SNEP)	7
Swiss Albums (Schweizer Hitparade)	37
Chart (2017)	Position
Belgian Albums (Ultratop Wallonia)	39
Chart (2018)	Position
Belgian Albums (Ultratop Wallonia)	109
Chart (2019)	Position
Belgian Albums (Ultratop Wallonia)	128
Chart (2020)	Position
Belgian Albums (Ultratop Wallonia)	137
Chart (2021)	Position
Belgian Albums (Ultratop Wallonia)	116
Chart (2025)	Position
Belgian Albums (Ultratop Wallonia)	17

== Certifications ==
Region	Certification	Certified units/sales
Belgium (BRMA)	Platinum	30,000^{*}
Denmark (IFPI Danmark)	2× Platinum	40,000^{‡}
France (SNEP)	Diamond	500,000^{‡}
Switzerland (IFPI Switzerland)	Platinum	20,000^{^}
^{*} Sales figures based on certification alone.^{^} Shipments figures based on certification alone.^{‡} Sales+streaming figures based on certification alone.
