= Maman (2025 song) =

2025 single by Louane

Single by Louane

from the album Tiens mon best of
- Language: French
- B-side: "Maman" (instrumental)
- Released: 15 March 2025
- Genre: Pop; ballad
- Length: 3:00
- Label: Island Def Jam
- Composers: Louane; Tristan Salvati
- Lyricist: Louane
- Producer: Tristan Salvati

Louane singles chronology
"Et si" (2024)	"Maman" (2025)	"Chiens" (2025)

Music videos
- "Maman" on YouTube "Maman" (English version) on YouTube

Eurovision Song Contest 2025 entry
- Country: France
- Artist: Louane
- Language: French
- Composers: Louane; Tristan Salvati
- Lyricist: Louane

Finals performance
- Final result: 7th
- Final points: 230

Entry chronology
- ◄ "Mon amour" (2024)
- "Regarde !" (2026) ►

Official performance video
- "Maman" (second semi-final) on YouTube "Maman" (grand final) on YouTube

"Maman" (lit. 'mum'; stylized in all lowercase) is a song by French singer Louane. It was written by Louane herself alongside Tristan Salvati, who produced the song. The ballad was released on 15 March 2025 and represented France in the Eurovision Song Contest 2025.

== Background and composition ==
The song "Maman" is a tribute to Louane's mother, who died of cancer in 2014, when Louane was 17 years old.

In 2015, she released another song with the same title as part of her debut album, Chambre 12. In 2025, this first song was delisted from streaming platforms in favour of the new song. Louane commented: “It's a sequel, of course. There are a few words in common between the two, but they're two different songs. For the first time, I'm finally well. And this new song exists for that reason. I'd like it to be the only thing we remember, rather than dwelling on the past."

The 2025 "Maman" makes several references to the 2015 song, showing how Louane has grieved her mother in the last ten years. For example, the 2015 song started with the words "Les amants passent de lit en lit" (Lovers move from bed to bed), the 2025 song starts with the words "Y a plus d'amants, Y a plus de lits" (No more lovers, no more beds). Whilst the 2015 song was notably downbeat ("I'm not well in my head [...] I've lost my taste for fun [...] I can't find meaning in my quest"), the 2025 song is more positive and upbeat with the chorus "Je vais mieux, je sais où je vais" (I'm better, I know where I'm going). The 2025 song cites finding love and becoming a mother herself as to how Louane got better.

"Maman" was released on vinyl, with its instrumental version as its B-side. Both the original and an English-language version of the song are included on the track listing of Louane's best-of album, Tiens mon best of (2025). An acoustic version of "Maman" was released on 18 April 2025.

== Eurovision Song Contest 2025 ==
=== Internal selection ===
France's broadcaster France Télévisions, via France 2, officially announced their participation in the Eurovision Song Contest 2025 on 30 August 2024. On 30 January 2025, Louane was officially announced as the country's representative for that year. On 15 March 2025, she revealed her entry as "Maman", and performed it at the Stade de France, during half-time of the match between France and Scotland in the 2025 Six Nations Championship tournament.

=== At Eurovision ===
The Eurovision Song Contest 2025 took place at St. Jakobshalle in Basel, Switzerland, and consisted of two semi-finals held on the respective dates of 13 and 15 May and the final on 17 May 2025. As France is a member of the "Big Five", "Maman" automatically qualified for the final.

== Track listing ==
Digital download/streaming

1. "Maman" – 3:00

Digital download/streaming – Acoustic version

1. "Maman" (acoustique) – 3:04
2. "Maman" – 3:00

Digital download/streaming – Instrumental

1. "Maman" (instrumental) – 3:00
2. "Maman" – 3:00
3. "Maman" (acoustique) – 3:04

Digital download/streaming – Live from Stade de France version

1. "Maman" (Live from Stade de France) – 3:53
2. "Maman" – 3:00
3. "Maman" (acoustique) – 3:04
4. "Maman" (instrumental) – 3:00

Digital download/streaming – English version

1. "Maman" (English version) – 3:00
2. "Maman" – 3:00
3. "Maman (Live from Stade de France)" – 3:53
4. "Maman" (acoustique) – 3:04
5. "Maman" (instrumental) – 3:00

== Charts ==
Chart performance for "Maman"
Chart (2025)	Peak position
Austria (Ö3 Austria Top 40)	61
Belgium (Ultratop 50 Wallonia)	23
France (SNEP)	23
Greece International (IFPI)	21
Lithuania (AGATA)	39
Luxembourg (Billboard)	18
Netherlands (Single Tip)	8
Sweden (Sverigetopplistan)	78
Switzerland (Schweizer Hitparade)	13
UK Singles Downloads (OCC)	72
UK Singles Sales (OCC)	76

== Certifications ==
Certifications and sales for "Maman"
Region	Certification	Certified units/sales
Belgium (BRMA)	Platinum	40,000^{‡}
France (SNEP)	Platinum	200,000^{‡}
^{‡} Sales+streaming figures based on certification alone.

== Release history ==
Release dates and formats for "Maman"
Region	Date	Format(s)	Version	Label	Ref.
Various	15 March 2025	Digital download; streaming	Original	Island Def Jam	
Various	18 April 2025	Digital download; streaming	Acoustic	Island Def Jam	
Various	25 April 2025	Digital download; streaming	Instrumental	Island Def Jam	
Various	2 May 2025	Digital download; streaming	Live from Stade de France	Island Def Jam	
Various	23 May 2025	Digital download; streaming	English	Island Def Jam	
