= Joie de vivre (album) =

2020 album by Louane

Studio album by Louane
- Released: 23 October 2020
- Label: Mercury
- Producer: Vladimir Boudnikiff; Adelaide Chabannes De Balsac; Diogo Clemente; Damso; Nikola Feve; Aloïs Zandry

Louane chronology
Louane (2017)	Joie de vivre (2020)

Singles from Joie de vivre
- 1. "Donne-moi ton cœur" Released: 3 July 2020; 2. "Poésie indécise" Released: 28 September 2020; 3. "Désolée" Released: 17 November 2020; 4. "Aimer à mort" Released: 2021

Joie de vivre is the third studio album by French singer Louane. It was released on October 23, 2020, by Mercury Records.

== Singles ==
Four songs from the album were released as singles. "Donne-moi ton cœur" was released as a single on 3 July 2020. "Poésie Indécise" was released as a single on 28 September 2020. "Désolée" was released as a single on 17 November 2020. "Aimer à mort" was released as the fourth single.

== Artwork ==
The album's cover art is a photograph of Louane taken by British photographer Martin Parr.

== Sales performance ==
The album sold over 12,000 copies in France after its first week, making it to the top 6. At the same time, it managed to be the 4th most sold in pure copies. The album exceeded 50,000 copies in France in January 2021 and 100,000 copies in December of the same year.

== Reissue ==
In 2021, the album was reissued as Joie de vivre (En couleurs) by Universal Music France and Island Def Jam, with new cover art (also by Parr) and additional tracks.

== Track listing ==
Joie de vivre track listing
No.	Title	Length
1.	"Intro"	0:13
2.	"Songes"	2:38
3.	"Donne-moi ton cœur"	4:31
4.	"Poésie indécise"	3:49
5.	"Pleure"	3:25
6.	"1nterlude"	0:15
7.	"3919"	2:55
8.	"Peut-être"	3:03
9.	"J'peux pas"	2:45
10.	"Love"	3:15
11.	"Sans ta voix"	3:07
12.	"Interlud3"	0:16
13.	"Désolée"	3:00
14.	"Toute ma vie" (featuring Soolking)	2:59
15.	"Aimer à mort"	2:54
16.	"À l'autre"	2:59
17.	"Mademoiselle tout le monde"	2:32
18.	"Ta peau"	3:02
19.	"Donne-moi ton coeur"	3:11

Nouvelle édition bonus track
No.	Title	Length
20.	"Derrière le brouillard" (in duo avec Grand Corps Malade)	4:13

Joie de vivre (En couleurs) track listing
No.	Title	Length
1.	"Donne-moi ton cœur"	3:10
2.	"Tornade"	3:22
3.	"Comment Faire"	2:40
4.	"Aimer à mort"	2:55
5.	"Derrière le brouillard" (in duo avec Grand Corps Malade)	4:13
6.	"Songes"	2:40
7.	"Poésie indécise"	3:50
8.	"Peut-être"	3:03
9.	"Les Gens"	3:00
10.	"J'peux pas"	2:46
11.	"À l'autre"	3:00
12.	"Love"	3:17
13.	"Sans ta voix"	3:09
14.	"Thérapie"	2:25
15.	"Désolée"	3:02
16.	"Toute ma vie" (featuring Soolking)	3:01
17.	"3919"	2:57
18.	"Mademoiselle tout le monde"	2:35
19.	"Ta peau"	2:57
20.	"Fais le bien"	2:58
21.	"C'est Nouveau"	2:17

== Charts ==
=== Weekly charts ===
Chart (2020)	Peak position
Belgian Albums (Ultratop Flanders)	135
Belgian Albums (Ultratop Wallonia)	6
French Albums (SNEP)	6
German Albums (Offizielle Top 100)	92
Swiss Albums (Schweizer Hitparade)	9

=== Year-end charts ===
Chart (2020)	Position
Belgian Albums (Ultratop Wallonia)	69
French Albums (SNEP)	80

Chart (2021)	Position
Belgian Albums (Ultratop Wallonia)	137
French Albums (SNEP)	67

== Release history ==
Release dates and formats for Joie de vivre
Region	Date	Format	Version	Label	Ref.
France	23 October 2020	CD; LP	Standard	Mercury	
France	26 February 2021	CD	Nouvelle édition	Mercury	
France	12 November 2021	CD	En couleurs	Mercury	
