= 2015 in Australian music =

The following is a list of notable events and releases that happened in 2015 in music in Australia.

== Events ==
=== March ===
- 5 March – At a press conference in the Sydney Opera House, SBS announces the selection of Guy Sebastian to represent Australia in the Eurovision Song Contest 2015, with the song, "Tonight Again".

=== May ===
- 23 May – Australia, represented by Guy Sebastian, finishes in fifth place in the Eurovision Song Contest 2015 with a total of 196 points.

=== July ===
- 24–26 July – Splendour in the Grass 2015 is held at North Byron Parklands in Yelgun, New South Wales, headlined by Blur, Florence and the Machine and Mark Ronson.

== Releases ==
=== Albums ===
- 30 October – Eleven by Tina Arena

== Deaths ==
- 19 February – Warren Thomson, 79, pianist
- 18 August – Roger Smalley, 72, pianist
- 11 October – John Murphy, 56, musician
- 27 December – Stevie Wright, 68, musician and songwriter, lead singer of The Easybeats

== See also ==
- Australia in the Eurovision Song Contest 2015
- List of number-one singles of 2015 (Australia)
- List of number-one albums of 2015 (Australia)
