= Normal (Alonzo song) =

Single by Alonzo and Jul

from the album Capo dei Capi
- Released: 2015
- Genre: Rap
- Length: 3:55
- Songwriters: Alonzo; Jul
- Producers: Alonzo; Jul

"Normal" is a song released in 2015 by Alonzo and Jul.

== Charts ==
Chart (2015)	Peak position
France (SNEP)	7
