= Andy Balcon =

English singer-songwriter (born 1988)

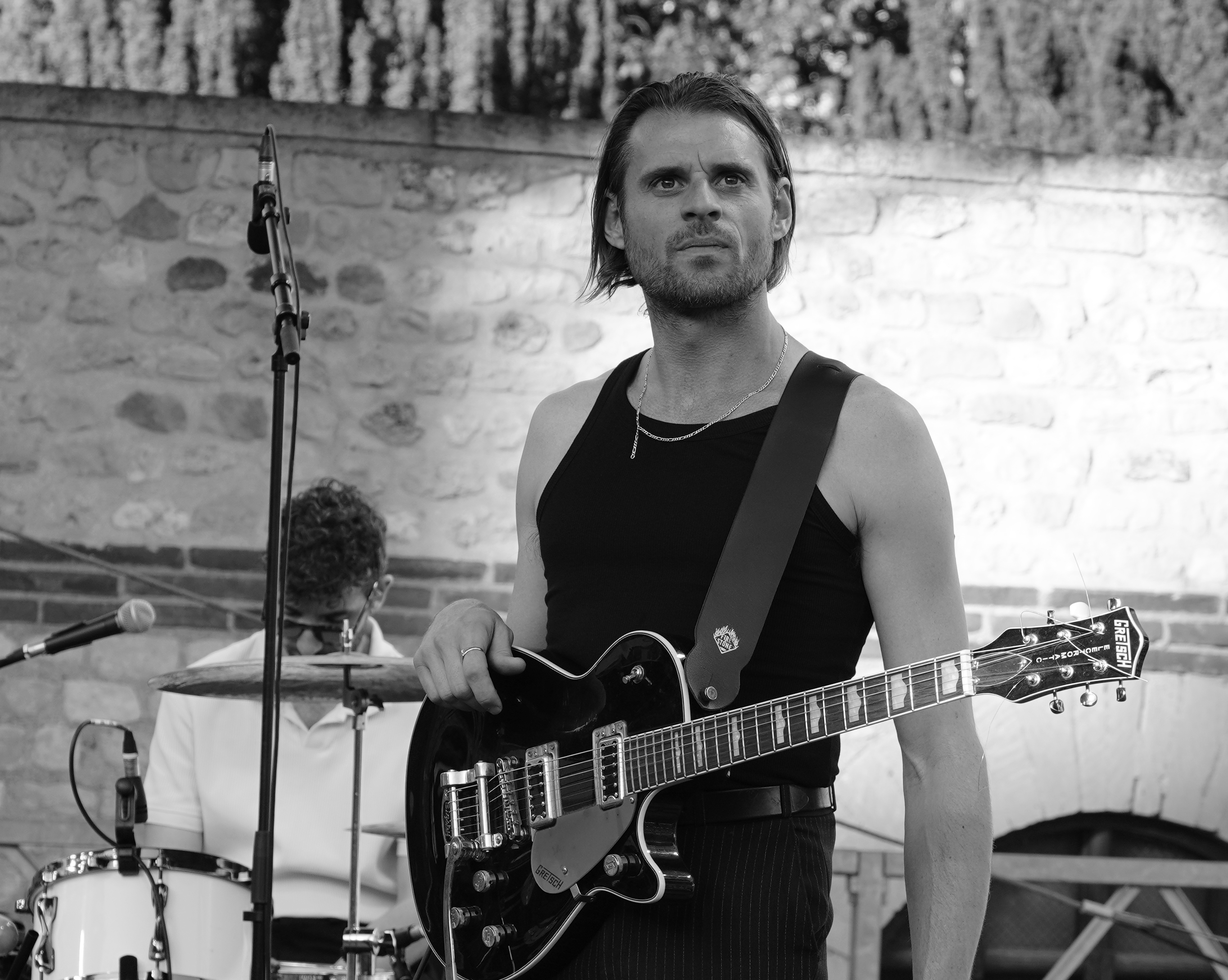
- 2024

Background information
- Born: Andrew Balcon; 1988 (age 37–38); Leeds, West Yorkshire, England
- Occupations: Singer; composer; musician
- Years active: 2009–present
- Member of: Heymoonshaker, Dead Chic
- Website: official.shop/heymoonshaker, deadchic.band
- Musical career
- Genres: Rock; pop rock; blues
- Instruments: Vocals, guitar
- Labels: Shaker Record; Dify Records

Andy Balcon (born Andrew Balcon; 1988) is a British singer, guitarist, and composer.

== Early life ==
Andy was born Andrew Balcon in 1988 in Leeds, England. He took guitar lessons and in highschool played in a rock band. He took some jobs to pay his journeys and performed in local scenes.

== Career ==
=== Heymoonshaker ===
Andrew Balcon met the British beatboxer Dave Crowe in New Zealand in 2007 and formed a beatbox blues band in 2008 called Heymoonshaker. Dave Crowe was born in 1988 at Ledbury. He discovered the dubstep and the beatboxer A-Plus and decided to become involved in beatboxing. In 2008 he participated to Britain's Got Talent (series 2) and joined the band The Anomalies. In 2010 he reached finals of UK Beatbox Championships. They made street-shows by jaming and played at Buskers festival in Christchurch. They published on their YouTube channel the single London Part 2 who made 20 million of views and in 2017, 50 million.

In 2012, they produced and sold their first album Beatbox Blues, inspired by Led Zeppelin and Muddy Waters. They toured in festivals around the world and Rolling Stone said that they were "A well balanced mix of smiles, verbal sparring and an impressive performance convey deep emotions. Dazzling!".

In 2015, they signed with Dify Records for the album Noir, recorded in south of France with new instruments : violons, bass.

=== Other projects ===
Andy Balcon, influenced by Led Zeppelin, The Rolling Stones, Etta James got a solo career. He released his first blues album Andy Balcon Band in 2012. In 2019, Kiss Goodnight was a pop electronic EP and his voice was compared to Tom Waits. He sang again in London's streets and released in 2020 the EP Who am I? more bluesy.

In 2022, he founded with Damien Félix (Catfish and Bigger) the band Dead Chic and released the heavy rock and soul EP Bastion Session. In 2024 the band released his first album The Venus Ballroom.

== Discography ==
=== Andy Balcon ===
- Andy Balcon Band (2012)
- Kiss Goodnight (EP) (2019)
- Who am I? (EP) (2020)

=== Heymoonshaker ===
- Beatbox Blues (2012)
- Shakerism (2013) (EP)
- Noir (2015)
- Live in France (2017)

=== Dead Chic ===
- Bastion Session (EP) (2022)
- The Venus Ballroom (EP) (2023)
- The Venus Ballroom (2024)

=== Collaborations ===
- Stand up with Tilka (2017)
- Oh, Me with Catfish (2020)
