= Validée =

Single by Booba and Benash

from the album Nero nemesis
- Released: 2015
- Length: 3:25
- Songwriter: Sidiki Diabaté
- Producers: Booba, Hi Stakes

"Validée" is a song by Booba and Benash released in 2015 from the album Nero Nemesis.

== Charts ==
| Chart (2015) | Peak position |
|---|---|
| Belgium (Ultratop 50 Wallonia) | 41 |
| France (SNEP) | 2 |
