= 2015 in Icelandic music =

The following is a list of notable events and releases of the year 2015 in Icelandic music.

== Events ==
=== March ===
- 3 – At Söngvakeppnin 2018, Ari Ólafsson is selected to represent Iceland in the 2018 Eurovision Song Contest, with the song "Heim".

=== June ===
- 23 – The Við Djúpið summer courses and music festival started in Ísafjörður, Westfjords (June 23 – 28).

=== July ===
- 1 - The 16th Folk music festival of Siglufjordur was opened (July 1 - 5).

=== August ===
- 12 – Reykjavik Jazz Festival opened, celebrating its 25th anniversary.

== Album and Singles releases ==
=== January ===
Day	Album	Artist	Label	Notes	Ref.
20	Vulnicura	Björk	One Little Indian		

=== June ===
Day	Album	Artist	Label	Notes	Ref.
9	Beneath the Skin	Of Monsters and Men	Republic Records	Produced by Of Monsters and Men, Rich Costey	

=== November ===
Day	Album	Artist	Label	Notes	Ref.
9	Nótt eftir nótt	Kælan Mikla	Artoffact Records		

== See also ==
- 2015 in Iceland
- Music of Iceland
- Iceland in the Eurovision Song Contest 2015
