= Regarde! =

2026 song by Monroe

"Regarde !"

Single by Monroe
- Language: French
- Released: 6 March 2026
- Genre: Operatic pop
- Songwriter: Monroe

Music video
- "Regarde !" on YouTube

"Regarde !" (in English: Look!) is a song by French-American soprano singer Monroe. It was released in 2026 as a standalone single, which is performed in French and combines elements of operatic pop with contemporary electronic influences.

The song represented France in the Eurovision Song Contest 2026, finishing 11th with 158 points.

== Background ==
According to Monroe, the song was inspired by themes of self-reflection, emotional vulnerability, and human connection. The title, which translates to "Look!" in English, reflects the song's message about seeing the world and personal relationships from a different perspective.

== Composition ==
Musically, "Regarde !" is a mid-tempo operatic pop song that performed in French featuring synthesizers, atmospheric production, and melodic vocal performance. The lyrics discuss love, distance, and emotional honesty.

== Release and promotion ==
The song was released on digital streaming platforms in 2026. Monroe promoted the single through social media performances and live appearances in France and other francophone countries. "Regarde !" received positive responses from listeners for its emotional lyrics and modern production style. Critics highlighted Monroe's vocal performance and the song's cinematic atmosphere.

== Charts ==
Weekly chart performance for "Regarde !"
Chart (2026)	Peak position
Austria (Ö3 Austria Top 40)	68
Greece International (IFPI)	70
