= 2015 in Finnish music =

The following is a list of notable events and releases of the year 2015 in Finnish music.

== Events ==
=== February ===
- 7 - The Uuden Musiikin Kilpailu 2015 Semi-finals was initiated February 7. The next two semi-finals is executed February 14 and 21.
- 28 - The Uuden Musiikin Kilpailu 2015 Final was executed on February 28.

=== October ===
- 29 - The Tampere Jazz Happening opened (October 29 - November 1).

== Deaths ==
November

- 23 – Jouni Kaipainen (58), Finnish composer.

== See also ==
- Music of Finland
- Finland in the Eurovision Song Contest 2015
