= 2015 in Danish music =

The following is a list of notable events and releases of the year 2015 in Danish music.

== Events ==
=== February ===
- 1 - The Danish National Chamber Orchestra, under its new name of Danmarks Underholdningsorkester, gives its first concert as a privately funded ensemble, at the Royal Academy of Music in Copenhagen.
- 7 - The Dansk Melodi Grand Prix Final was executed on February 7, in Aalborg.

=== June ===
- 3 – The 17th Distortion festival started in Copenhagen (June 3–7).
- 27 – The Roskilde Festival opened, with a line-up including Muse, Florence and the Machine and Pharrell Williams.

=== July ===
- 16 – G! Festival opened in Göta, Eysturoy, Faroe Islands (July 16–18).

== Album and Singles releases ==
=== February ===
Day	Album	Artist	Label	Notes	Ref.
6	Gefion	Jakob Bro	ECM Records	Produced by Manfred Eicher	

=== August ===
Day	Album	Artist	Label	Notes	Ref.
28	Just The Two Of Us	Cæcilie Norby and Lars Danielsson	ACT Music		

== Deaths ==
March

- 21 – Jørgen Ingmann, Danish jazz and pop guitarist (born 1925).

August

- 30 – Hugo Rasmussen, Danish bassist (born 1941).

== See also ==
- Music of Denmark
- Denmark in the Eurovision Song Contest 2015
