= Laissez passer (song) =

Single by Maître Gims

from the album Mon cœur avait raison
- Released: 22 June 2015
- Length: 4:25
- Songwriters: Renaud Rebillaud; Bastien Vincent; Gandhi Djuna

Music video
- "Laissez paisser" on YouTube

"Laissez passer" (English: "Let It Go") is a song by Congolese singer and rapper Maître Gims from the album Mon cœur avait raison.

== Charts ==
=== Weekly charts ===
Weekly chart performance for "Laissez passer"
Chart (2015)	Peak position
Belgium (Ultratop 50 Wallonia)	7
France (SNEP)	7

=== Year-end charts ===
Year-end chart performance for "Laissez passer"
Chart (2015)	Position
Belgium (Ultratop Wallonia)	78
France (SNEP)	42

== Certifications ==
Certifications for "Laissez passer"
Region	Certification	Certified units/sales
France (SNEP)	Gold	75,000^{*}
^{*} Sales figures based on certification alone.
