= Chambre 12 =

Studio album by Louane
- Released: March 2, 2015
- Recorded: 2013–14
- Genre: French pop
- Length: 53:00
- Label: Fontana, Mercury, Universal
- Producer: Dan Black

Louane chronology
Chambre 12 (2015)	Louane (2017)

Singles from Chambre 12
- 1. "Jour 1" Released: March 24, 2014; 2. "Avenir" Released: December 1, 2014; 3. "Jeune (j'ai envie)" Released: July 20, 2015; 4. "Nos secrets" Released: September 7, 2015; 5. "Maman" Released: November 30, 2015; 6. "Tourne" Released: March 7, 2016

Chambre 12 (French for Room 12) is the debut studio album by French singer and actress Louane. It debuted at number one in her native France on the week of March 8, 2015, with 60,370 copies sold and was certified Gold in its first week.

At the end of 2015, it was announced as the second best-selling album of the year in France with 772,300 copies sold, and was certified 2× Diamond. It was also the second best-selling album of 2015 in the Walloon region of Belgium.

== Track listing ==
No.	Title	Writer(s)	Length
1.	"Jour 1"	Patxi Garat	3:37
2.	"Avenir" (radio edit)	Louane Emera, Quentin Capron	3:05
3.	"Maman" (album version)	Yohann Malory, Tristan Salvati	2:42
4.	"Jeune" (album version)	Dan Black, Patxi Garat	3:35
5.	"Tourne" (album version)	Patxi Garat	3:43
6.	"Chambre 12" (album version)	Yohann Malory, Tristan Salvati	4:04
7.	"Tranquille"	Antoine Chance, Fred Perrot	3:51
8.	"Alien"	David Gategno, Amaury Salmon	3:40
9.	"Nous"	Dan Black, Joe Hirst, Daniel Baker, Pauline Lopez de Ayora, Florent Biolchini	3:49
10.	"Du courage"	Patxi Garat	3:09
11.	"La fuite"	Patxi Garat	3:10
12.	"Je vole" (bonus track)	Pierre Billon, Michel Sardou, Marie Jeanne Serero, Philip J Glenister, Victoria Bedos, Eric Lartigau	3:36
13.	"La mère à Titi" (bonus track)	Renaud Séchan, Franck Langolff	4:12
14.	"Avenir" (original version, bonus track)		3:16
15.	"Jeune" (radio edit, bonus track)		3:04
16.	"Chambre 12" (radio edit, bonus track)		3:19
17.	"Tourne" (radio edit, bonus track)		3:36
18.	"Maman" (radio edit, bonus track)		2:52

== Chart performance ==
=== Weekly charts ===
Chart (2015–17)	Peak position
Belgian Albums (Ultratop Flanders)	92
Belgian Albums (Ultratop Wallonia)	1
French Albums (SNEP)	1
German Albums (Offizielle Top 100)	22
Swiss Albums (Romandie)	1
Swiss Albums (Schweizer Hitparade)	6

=== Year-end charts ===
Chart (2015)	Position
Belgian Albums (Ultratop Wallonia)	2
French Albums (SNEP) (Sales and streaming)	1
French Albums (SNEP) (Sales)	2
Swiss Albums (Schweizer Hitparade)	11
Chart (2016)	Position
Belgian Albums (Ultratop Wallonia)	10
French Albums (SNEP) (Sales and streaming)	16
French Albums (SNEP) (Sales)	14
Swiss Albums (Schweizer Hitparade)	33
Chart (2017)	Position
Belgian Albums (Ultratop Wallonia)	100

== Certifications and sales ==
Region	Certification	Certified units/sales
Belgium (BRMA)	Platinum	30,000^{*}
France (SNEP)	2× Diamond	1,000,000^{‡}
Switzerland (IFPI Switzerland)	Gold	10,000^{^}
^{*} Sales figures based on certification alone.^{^} Shipments figures based on certification alone.^{‡} Sales+streaming figures based on certification alone.
