= Je vole =

1978 single by Michel Sardou

Single by Michel Sardou

from the album Je vole
- A-side: "Je vole"
- B-side: "8 jours à El Paso"
- Released: 1978
- Recorded: 1978
- Length: 5:02
- Songwriters: Pierre Billon; Michel Sardou
- Producer: Pierre Billon

"Je vole" is a 1978 song by French singer Michel Sardou and the title track of the same titled album Je vole by Sardou. The B-side of the single was "8 jours à El Paso". The lyrics of "je vole" were co-written by Michel Sardou and Pierre Billon and the music was composed by Sardou himself. The song was a big commercial success reaching number 3 in France selling approximately 500,000 copies.

== Context ==
The song is a last silent appeal of an adolescent on the verge of committing suicide the same day. This was confirmed in Sardou's autobiography: "je vole is not about an adolescent running away, it's about an adolescent who's about to commit suicide".

The main part of the lyrics is spoken by Sardou as prose, and only the refrain is sung:

Mes chers parents	My dear parents
Je pars	I'm leaving
Je vous aime mais je pars	I love you but I'm leaving
Vous n'aurez plus d'enfant	You won't have a child anymore
Ce soir	[as of] Tonight
Je n' m'enfuis pas je vole	I'm not running away, I'm flying [away]
Comprenez bien je vole	Understand [me] well, I'm flying [away]
Sans fumée sans alcool	Without smoking nor drinking [i.e. without getting high or drunk]
Je vole je vole	I'm flying away, I'm flying away

== Track listing ==
1. "Je vole" (5:02)
2. "8 jours à El Paso" (3:07)

== Charts ==
Chart (1978)	Peak position
France (SNEP)	3

== In popular culture ==
=== Louane Emera's version ===
"Je vole"

Song by Louane Emera

from the album La famille Bélier: Bande originale du film
- Released: 2014
- Recorded: 2014
- Length: 3:33
- Songwriters: Pierre Billon; Michel Sardou; Marie Jeanne Serero; Philip J Glenister; Victoria Bedos; Eric Lartigau
- Producer: Dan Black

The song's subject was adapted for the storyline of the 2014 French film La famille Bélier directed by Éric Lartigau. The story writer Victoria Bedos indicated that she based her story on the song "je vole" as she considered Sardou's songs very inspirational. Since the sentiments in "Je vole" touched her heart deeply, she submitted a film project to the producers based on the youth character with a spirit of emancipation as expressed in the song.

"Je vole" is performed on the soundtrack of the film by Louane (full name Louane Emera), a singer in Top 8 of season 2 of the French The Voice: la plus belle voix picked for the lead actress in the film.

The text of the song was slightly changed but the general meaning and even phraseology were kept. Only the refrain is kept intact word for word. Another striking difference is that the whole song is sung by Louane, whereas in the original, Sardou spoke the lyrics and only sings the refrain. Several other songs of Sardou are also used in the soundtrack for the film.

=== Weekly charts ===
Chart (2014–15)	Peak position
Belgium (Ultratop 50 Wallonia)	15
France (SNEP)	2
Switzerland (Schweizer Hitparade)	73
Switzerland (Media Control Romandy)	13

=== Year-end charts ===
Chart (2015)	Position
Belgium (Ultratop Wallonia)	21

=== Certifications ===
Region	Certification	Certified units/sales
France (SNEP)	Gold	75,000^{*}
^{*} Sales figures based on certification alone.
