= Avenir (song) =

Single by Louane

from the album Chambre 12
- Released: December 1, 2014
- Recorded: 2014
- Genre: French pop; alternative R&B
- Length: 3:15
- Label: Mercury; Fontana; Universal
- Songwriters: Louane Emera, Quentin Capron
- Producer: Dan Black

Louane singles chronology
"Jour 1" (2014)	"Avenir" (2014)	"Jeune (j'ai envie)" (2015)

"Avenir" is the second single by French singer and actress Louane from her debut studio album Chambre 12. The song was released as digital EP and digital download on December 1, 2014, and January 5, 2015, respectively. On October 30, 2015, a CD single was issued in Austria, Germany and Switzerland.

It is Louane's most successful single to date, topping the charts in her native France. It was the first time that a reality show contestant landed a number-one single in France since Sheryfa Luna's "Il avait les mots" in 2008. It also reached number one in Luxembourg, and the top 10 in Austria, Belgium, Germany and Slovakia.

== Track listing ==
- Digital download
1. "Avenir" – 3:03
- Digital EP
1. "Jour 1" – 3:36
2. "Avenir" – 3:15
3. "Maman" – 2:41
4. "Jour 1" (Dan Black Alternative) – 3:07
5. "Jour 1" (Gostan Remix) – 3:16
- CD single
1. "Avenir" (Radio Edit) – 3:03
2. "Avenir" – 3:15

== Chart performance ==
=== Weekly charts ===
Weekly chart performance for "Avenir"
Chart (2015–2016)	Peak position
Austria (Ö3 Austria Top 40)	4
Belgium (Ultratip Bubbling Under Flanders)	7
Belgium (Ultratop 50 Wallonia)	5
CIS Airplay (TopHit)	174
Czech Republic Airplay (ČNS IFPI)	31
France (SNEP)	1
Germany (GfK)	3
Luxembourg Digital Songs (Billboard)	1
Poland Airplay (ZPAV)	18
Russia Airplay (TopHit)	174
Slovakia Airplay (ČNS IFPI)	4
Slovakia Singles Digital (ČNS IFPI)	91
Switzerland (Schweizer Hitparade)	42
Switzerland (Media Control Romandy)	5

=== Year-end charts ===
Chart (2015)	Position
Belgium (Ultratop Wallonia)	11
France (SNEP) (Sales and streaming)	6
France (SNEP) (Streaming)	8
Germany (Official German Charts)	37

=== Certifications ===
Region	Certification	Certified units/sales
Belgium (BRMA)	Gold	10,000^{‡}
France (SNEP)	Gold	75,000^{*}
Germany (BVMI)	Platinum	400,000^{‡}
^{*} Sales figures based on certification alone.^{‡} Sales+streaming figures based on certification alone.
