= Louane (singer) =

French actress and singer

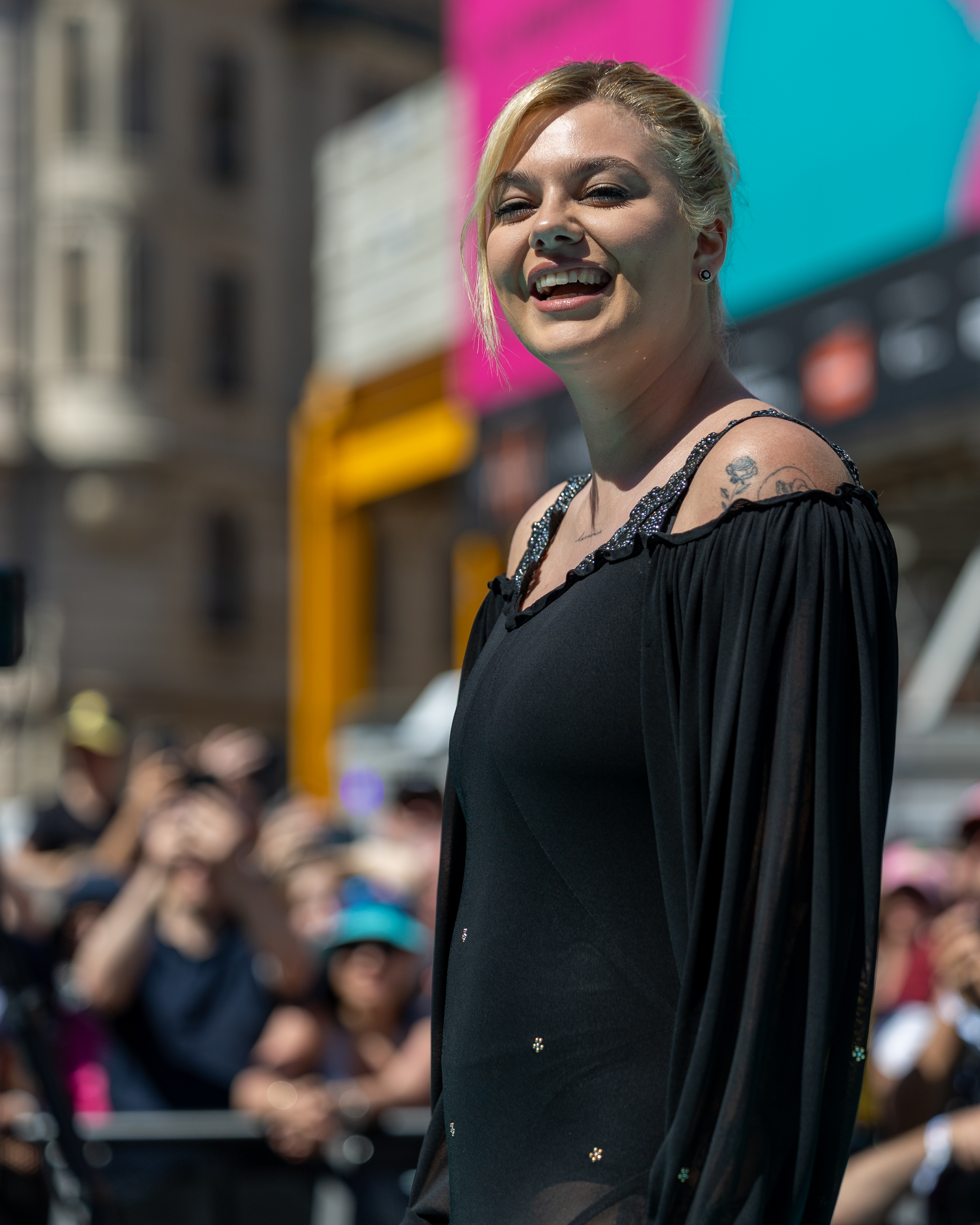
- Louane in 2025

Background information
- Born: Anne Edwige Maria Peichert; 26 November 1996 (age 29); Sainte-Catherine, Pas-de-Calais, France
- Genres: French pop; electronica; alternative dance
- Occupations: Singer; songwriter; actress
- Instruments: Vocals; piano; guitar
- Years active: 2013–present
- Labels: Universal Music Group; Mercury Records
- Partner: Florian Rossi
- Website: louane.store

Anne Edwige Maria Peichert (French pronunciation: [an peʃɛʁ]; born 26 November 1996), known by her stage name Louane Emera ([lwan emɛʁa]) or simply Louane, is a French singer and actress. In France she became known for being a semi-finalist in the 2013 season of The Voice: la plus belle voix, and is known internationally for her role in the 2014 film La Famille Bélier, for which she won the César Award for Most Promising Actress. She represented France in the Eurovision Song Contest 2025 with the song Maman, where she finished seventh with 230 points.

== Early life ==
Born Anne Peichert in Sainte-Catherine on 26 November 1996, she grew up in the French department of Pas-de-Calais, with her four sisters and her only brother Benoît. Louane's father, Jean-Pierre Peichert, was French, son of a Polish mother and German father. Her mother, Isabel Pinto dos Santos, was Brazilian-Portuguese, daughter of a Portuguese father and a Brazilian mother.

In 2008, she took part in L'École des stars, a French music competition broadcast on channel Direct 8.

Louane, who was diagnosed with ADHD at the age of eight, said that her parents often had to punish her due to her hyperactivity, but that she has learned a lot about discipline from them and that they always treated her with love.

Louane lost both of her parents during her teenage years; her rendition of "Imagine" was dedicated to her father who had died just three months prior to her appearance in The Voice and her mother died in 2014 after a lengthy illness.

== Career ==
=== Music ===
In 2013, her first real breakthrough came with her taking part in The Voice: la plus belle voix's second season. She auditioned with "Un homme heureux" by William Sheller with all four coaches Florent Pagny, Jenifer, Louis Bertignac and Garou turning their chairs. She opted to be part of Team Louis Bertignac. Her "blind audition" episode was broadcast on 16 February 2013.

On 23 March 2013, during the Musical Battles round, she was picked by Bertignac against her rival Diana Espir, after both interpreted "Torn" by Natalie Imbruglia. During the live rounds, she sang "Les moulins de mon cœur" by Michel Legrand and was saved by public vote. On 27 April 2013 she performed "Call Me Maybe" by Carly Rae Jepsen and was saved by her mentor coach to go through. With Lennon's "Imagine" dedicated to her deceased father, she was saved yet again by public vote. But her luck ended in the semi-finals after her rendition of "Quelqu'un m'a dit" by Carla Bruni. She had a cumulative score of 74 while the other Team Bertignac semi-finalist Loïs had a composite score of 76. Accordingly, Louane was eliminated, finishing 5th to 8th.

On 5 February 2015, she served as an opening act for Jessie J's showcase in Paris.

Her debut studio album, Chambre 12, was released on 2 March 2015, to great success. Her single "Avenir" also topped the French charts.

In 2017, she provided vocals for the track, "It Won't Kill Ya," from The Chainsmokers' debut album, Memories...Do Not Open.

On 1 September 2021, for Pokémon 25, she released the song "Game Girl", whose name is a pun on the Game Boy.

On 30 January 2025, it was announced that Louane would represent France at the Eurovision Song Contest 2025 in Basel. The title of her song is "Maman", where she speaks of her late mother. In the Grand Final on May 17, she finished in seventh place with 230 points.

=== Acting ===
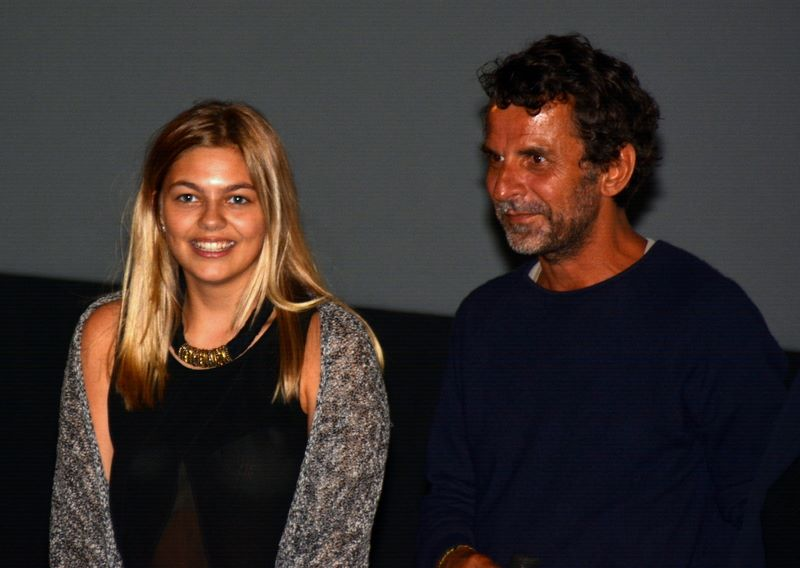
Louane and director Éric Lartigau at a 2014 event for La Famille Bélier

After her appearance in The Voice, Éric Lartigau noticed her and cast her for his movie La Famille Bélier in which she played the role of Paula, a 16-year-old who is the only hearing person in a family of deaf people. The character sings a number of Michel Sardou songs, most notably "Je vole". As a result, she won the César Award for Most Promising Actress at the 40th ceremony of the Césars.

She plays a leading role as a child psychologist in the TF1 2022 French TV series Visions, which premiered at Canneseries that year. The series, directed by Akim Isker, also stars Soufiane Guerrab, Jean-Hugues Anglade, and Julien Boisselier. The story centres on an investigation into a missing child, and young boy who appears to see strange visions.

== Personal life ==
Louane is in a relationship with singer Florian Rossi. In March 2020, she gave birth to a daughter called Esmée.

== Filmography ==
=== Films ===
Year	Title	Role	Notes
2014	La Famille Bélier	Paula Bélier	César Award for Most Promising Actress; Lumière Award for Best Female Revelation
2016	Trolls	Princess Poppy	French dubbing
2017	Sahara	Eva	French dubbing
2017	Nos patriotes	Marie	
2018	Les Affamés	Zoé	
2018	Incredibles 2	Violet Parr	French dubbing
2021	Belle	Suzu Naito / Belle	French dubbing
2022	Luck	Sam Greenfield	French dubbing
2023	Marie-Line et son juge	Marie-Line Leroy	

=== Television ===
==== Fiction ====
Year	Title	Role	Notes
2021	Attack on Titan	Zofia	French dubbing; season 4
2022	Visions	Sarah Sauvant	Main role

==== Competitions ====
Year	Title	Role	Notes
2008	L'École des stars	Candidat	Season 2
2013	The Voice – La plus belle voix	Candidat	Season 2; Semi-finalist
2022	The Voice Kids	Coach	Season 8
2024	Popstars	Judge	Season 6
2025	Eurovision Song Contest 2025	Participant	Representative of France

== Discography ==
- Chambre 12 (2015)
- Louane (2017)
- Joie de vivre (2020)
- Sentiments (2022)
- Solo (2024)

== Awards and nominations ==
Year	Award	Category	Nominee(s)	Result	Ref.
2015	Lumière Awards	Best Female Revelation	La Famille Bélier	Won	
2015	César Awards	Most Promising Actress	La Famille Bélier	Won	
2025	Eurovision Awards	Outstanding Vocals	Herself	Nominated	
2026	NRJ Music Awards	Francophone Concert of the Year	Herself	Nominated	

Awards and achievements
Preceded by Slimane with "Mon amour"	France in the Eurovision Song Contest; 2025	Succeeded by Monroe with "Regarde !"
