= No Me Mires Más =

Single by Kendji Girac and Soprano

from the album Ensemble
- Language: French, Spanish
- Released: 8 January 2016
- Genre: Pop, Latin pop
- Length: 4:10
- Songwriters: Soprano; Felipe Saldivia; Fred Savio; Kendji Girac
- Producers: Felipe Saldivia; Fred Savio

Kendji Girac singles chronology
"Les yeux de la mama" (2015)	"No Me Mires Más" (2016)	"Tu y yo" (2016)

Soprano singles chronology
"En feu" (2016)	"No Me Mires Más" (2016)	"Sonrisa" (2016)

Music video
- "No Me Mires Más" on YouTube

"No Me Mires Más" (Don't Look at Me Anymore) is a song by Kendji Girac featuring Soprano from the album Ensemble. The song peaked at No 7 on the French Singles Chart on 12 February 2016.

The song currently has 150 million views.

== Charts ==
=== Weekly charts ===
Chart (2016)	Peak position
Belgium (Ultratop 50 Wallonia)	11
France (SNEP)	7
Switzerland (Schweizer Hitparade)	31

=== Year-end charts ===
Chart (2016)	Position
Belgium (Ultratop Wallonia)	43
France (SNEP)	48
