= L'école de la vie =

Studio album by Kendji Girac
- Released: 11 November 2022
- Length: 39:05
- Languages: French, Spanish
- Labels: K7G; Island Def Jam
- Producer: Renaud Rebillaud

Kendji Girac chronology
Mi Vida (2020)	L'école de la vie (2022)	Vivre... (2024)

Singles from L'école de la vie
- 1. "Eva" Released: 2 September 2022; 2. "L'école de la vie" Released: 5 September 2022; 3. "Desperado" Released: 3 February 2023

L'école de la vie (English: The School of Life) is the fifth studio album by French singer Kendji Girac. It was released on 11 November 2022 by Island Def Jam. The album includes collaborations with the singers Vianney and Florent Pagny and the rappers Naps and Soprano, and was preceded by the single "Eva", a song named after and about his daughter. A version of the single "Desperado" includes vocals from rapper Soolking.

== Track listing ==
L'école de la vie track listing
No.	Title	Length
1.	"Eva"	3:38
2.	"Le feu" (with Vianney)	3:57
3.	"Desperado"	3:18
4.	"Les jeunes"	3:23
5.	"En boucle" (with Naps)	2:54
6.	"L'école de la vie"	3:06
7.	"Encore" (with Florent Pagny)	4:10
8.	"Plusieurs vies"	3:36
9.	"J'ai tendance" (with Soprano)	3:12
10.	"Para mi dios"	3:52
11.	"Eva" (acoustic)	3:59
Total length:		39:05

Bonus track
No.	Title	Length
12.	"Desperado" (with Soolking)	3:18
Total length:		42:23

== Charts ==
=== Weekly charts ===
Weekly chart performance for L'école de la vie
Chart (2022)	Peak position
Belgian Albums (Ultratop Wallonia)	3
French Albums (SNEP)	1
Swiss Albums (Schweizer Hitparade)	11

=== Year-end charts ===
2022 year-end chart performance for L'école de la vie
Chart (2022)	Position
Belgian Albums (Ultratop Wallonia)	82
French Albums (SNEP)	48

2023 year-end chart performance for L'école de la vie
Chart (2023)	Position
French Albums (SNEP)	48

2024 year-end chart performance for L'école de la vie
Chart (2024)	Position
French Albums (SNEP)	168

== Certifications ==
Region	Certification	Certified units/sales
France (SNEP)	Platinum	100,000^{‡}
^{‡} Sales+streaming figures based on certification alone.
