= Ensemble (Kendji Girac album) =

Studio album by Kendji Girac
- Released: 30 October 2015
- Recorded: 2015
- Language: French
- Label: ULM, Mercury, Universal

Kendji Girac chronology
Kendji (2014)	Ensemble (2015)	Amigo (2018)

Singles from Ensemble
- 1. "Me Quemo" Released: 2 September 2015; 2. "Les yeux de la mama" Released: 19 December 2015; 3. "No Me Mires Más" Released: 8 January 2016; 4. "Tu y yo" Released: 25 April 2016; 5. "Sonrisa" Released: 4 July 2016; 6. "Ma câlina" Released: 16 December 2016

Ensemble (pronounced [ɑ̃sɑ̃bl], literally Together) is the second studio album by French singer Kendji Girac. It was released on 30 October 2015, with "Me Quemo" released as the debut single from the album. The album has surpassed sales of a million copies as of 2019 and was certified diamond in France and 2× platinum on Belgian francophone charts.

Other singles from the album include the promotional "Les yeux de la mama" in 2015 and "No Me Mires Más" and "Tu y yo" in 2016. The album was also re-issued in November 2016, with "Sonrisa" and "Ma câlina" being released as two singles from the new issue of the album.

== Track listing ==
Ensemble track listing
No.	Title	Writer(s)	Producer(s)	Length
1.	"Tu y yo"	Kendji Girac, Felipe Saldivia, Fred Savio, Thomas Laroche	Felipe Saldivia, Fred Savio	3:42
2.	"Me Quemo"	Girac, Saldivia, Savio, Laroche	Saldivia, Savio	3:15
3.	"No Me Mires Más" (featuring Soprano)	Girac, Saldivia, Savio, Saïd M'Roumbaba	Saldivia, Savio	4:10
4.	"C'est trop"	Girac, Davide Esposito, Renaud Rebillaud, Nazim Khaled, Matthieu Mendes	Renaud Rebillaud, Mendes The Dude	2:42
5.	"Les yeux de la mama"	Girac, Nazim Khaled, Johan Errami	Saldivia, Savio	3:22
6.	"Jamais trop tard"	Girac, Rebillaud, Laroche	Rebillaud	3:41
7.	"Besame"	Girac, Rebillaud, Antoine Abardonado, Manuel Gutierez	Rebillaud	3:26
8.	"Una Mujer"	Girac, Frankie Romano, Michael Carlos Jones, Saldivia, Taurian Shropshire, Savio, Laroche, Sean Combs, Chauncey Lamon Hawkins, Mario Mendell Winans	Saldivia, Savio	3:39
9.	"La morale"	Girac, Rachid Mir, Christian Dessart, Khaled	The Bionix	3:08
10.	"Mes potes et moi"	Girac, Mir, Dessart, Khaled	The Bionix	2:44
11.	"Où va le monde ?"	Girac, Skalpovich, H Magnum, Karim Deneyer, R. Koua	Skalpovich	5:20
12.	"Ma solitude"	Girac, Esposito, Mendes, Rebillaud, Khaled	Rebillaud, Mendes	3:07
13.	"Amor y Libertad"	Girac, Abardonado	Saldivia	3:40

=== 2016 re-release bonus tracks ===
Ensemble bonus tracks
No.	Title	Writer(s)	Producer(s)	Length
14.	"Sonrisa"	Kendji Girac, Felipe Saldivia, Fred Savio	Felipe Saldivia, Fred Savio	3:24
15.	"Elle a tout"	Felipe Saldivia, Fred Savii	Felipe Saldivia, Fred Savio	2:44
16.	"Jamais à genoux"	Aissata Niang, Kendji Girac, Leslie Bourgouin	Kore, Aurélien Mazin, Nacer Mounder	3:04
17.	"Ma câlina"	Antoine Abardonado, Kendji Girac, Maska, Renaud Rebillaud	Renaud Rebillaud	3:57

== Charts ==
=== Weekly charts ===
Chart (2015)	Peak position
Belgian Albums (Ultratop Flanders)	88
Belgian Albums (Ultratop Wallonia)	1
French Albums (SNEP)	1
Swiss Albums (Schweizer Hitparade)	1

=== Year-end charts ===
Chart (2015)	Position
Belgian Albums (Ultratop Wallonia)	10
French Albums (SNEP)	4
Chart (2016)	Position
Belgian Albums (Ultratop Wallonia)	3
French Albums (SNEP)	6
Swiss Albums (Schweizer Hitparade)	23
Chart (2017)	Position
Belgian Albums (Ultratop Wallonia)	58

== Certifications ==
Region	Certification	Certified units/sales
Belgium (BRMA)	2× Platinum	60,000^{‡}
France (SNEP)	2× Diamond	1,000,000^{‡}
^{‡} Sales+streaming figures based on certification alone.
