= The Shady Brothers =

- Born: April 25, 1996 (age 29)
- Origin: Saint Martin
- Genres: Pop
- Years active: 2014-present
- Members: Geraldo Schaede; Nicolas Schaede
- Website: www.shady-brothers.com

The Shady Brothers is a singing and songwriting duo from the Caribbean island of Saint Martin made up of the twin brothers Geraldo and Nicolas Schaede born on 25 April 1996. Shady is an English language transliteration of their family name Schaede. Their debut single "Addicted to Your Love" was released on 19 May 2014 becoming their first charting hit notably in France after touring the country in 2014.

The two brothers were born in Saint Martin to a German father and a Dominican Republic mother and have three other siblings, all their seniors. They started performing various songs, including their own compositions mainly in English from a young age. They also speak Spanish.

In 2013, while just 16, they were discovered by a French music producer when an employee of a Saint Martin hotel he was staying in recommended them and arranged that they sing some of their own songs.

Armed with the video footage, the French producer promoted them in France and invited them for a tour in the country. Their single "Addicted to Your Love" was made available on iTunes and was included in the popular compilation album NRJ Summer Hits Only 2014 and later as an independent single charting in SNEP, the official French Singles Chart.

== In popular culture ==
In 2014, they were also part of the tribute album project Aznavour, sa jeunesse where they sang their version of "She". On the same album, they were part of the collective of singers interpreting "Sa jeunesse" led by Charles Aznavour. The artists in the song included Matt Houston, The Shady Brothers, Vitaa, Elisa Tovati, Soprano, Black M and Amel Bent.

== Discography ==
=== Singles ===
Year	Album	Peak positions
Year	Album	FR
2014	"Addicted to Your Love"	63

Collaborations

- 2014: In tribute album Aznavour, sa jeunesse
  - "She" (solo)
  - "Sa jeunesse" (collective song with Charles Aznavour with Matt Houston, The Shady Brothers, Vitaa, Elisa Tovati, Soprano, Black M & Amel Bent
