= Addicted to Love =

Addicted to Love may refer to:

- "Addicted to Love" (song), a song by Robert Palmer
- "Addicted to Love", a 2010 song by Ultra featuring Dappy and Fearless
- Addicted to Love (film), a 1997 movie named after the song
- Addicted to Love (TV series), a 2008 co-production drama

== See also ==
- Addicted to Your Love (disambiguation)
- Addicted to You (disambiguation)
