= Kendji (album) =

Studio album by Kendji Girac
- Released: 8 September 2014
- Recorded: 2014
- Language: French
- Label: Mercury
- Producer: The Bionix; Carl Falk; Christian Dessart; Giorgio Tuinfort; Ilya; Kerredine Soltani; Mendès the Dude; Rachid Mir; Rami; Raphael Nyadjiko; Renaud Rebillaud; Sandro Abaldonato; Savan Kotecha; Skalpovich

Kendji Girac chronology
| Kendji (2014) | Ensemble (2015) |

Singles from Kendji
- 1. "Color Gitano" Released: 16 June 2014; 2. "Andalouse" Released: 18 August 2014; 3. "Elle M'a Aimé" Released: 25 August 2014; 4. "One Last Time (Attends-Moi)" Released: 10 February 2015; 5. "Conmigo" Released: 18 March 2015; 6. "Cool" Released: 7 June 2015; 7. "Les Richesses du Cœur" Released: 2015

Kendji is the self-titled debut album by French singer Kendji Girac released on 8 September 2014 by Mercury Records. In France, it topped SNEP, the official French Albums Chart, and also became a hit in Belgium and Switzerland.

Two of the tracks, namely "Color Gitano" and "Bella" had earlier appeared on a five-track EP titled Kendji Girac EP released prior to the release of the album. The EP charted in June 2014 reaching number 44 on the SNEP French Albums Chart. The EP contained three more tracks that were not included in the album: "Toi et moi", "Ma philosophie" and "Tous les mêmes".

== Track listing ==
Kendji track listing
| No. | Title | Writer(s) | Producer(s) | Length |
|---|---|---|---|---|
| 1. | "Color Gitano" | Renaud Rebillaud; François Welgryn; Matthieu Mendès | Rebillaud; Mendès the Dude | 3:33 |
| 2. | "Andalouse" | Rachid Mir; Christian Dessart; Nazim Khaled | The Bionix | 2:49 |
| 3. | "Mon univers" | Pascal Boniani Koeu; Olivier Kowalski; Karim Deneyer; Johan Errami | Skalpovich | 3:24 |
| 4. | "Viens chez nous" | Kerredine Soltani; Tryss | Soltani | 3:31 |
| 5. | "Cool" | Mir; Dessart; Khaled | The Bionix | 3:19 |
| 6. | "Mi amor" | Koeu; Hervé Imboua; Deneyer; Errami | Skalpovich | 3:50 |
| 7. | "Avec toi" | Soltani; Fred Lafage | Soltani | 3:29 |
| 8. | "Baila amigo" | Sandro Abaldonato; Sébastien Abaldonato | Sandro Abaldonato | 3:18 |
| 9. | "Je m'abandonne" | Koeu; Imboua; Deneyer; Kendji Girac | Skalpovich | 3:17 |
| 10. | "Gentleman" (featuring Marine Basset) | Soltani; Tryss; Loko | Soltani | 3:01 |
| 11. | "Au sommet" | Koeu; Imboua; Deneyer | Skalpovich | 3:35 |
| 12. | "Elle m'a aimé" | Khalid Ahlalou; Raphaël Koua | Raphael Nyadjiko; Skalpovich | 3:26 |
| 13. | "Bella" (bonus track) | Bastien Vincent; Gandhi Djuna; Rebillaud | Mir; Dessart | 4:00 |

Limited edition bonus tracks
| No. | Title | Writer(s) | Producer(s) | Length |
|---|---|---|---|---|
| 14. | "La Bohème" | Charles Aznavour; Jacques Plante | | 3:23 |
| 15. | "Color Gitano" (Acoustic version) | Rebillaud; Welgryn; Mendès | Rebillaud; Mendès the Dude | 2:00 |
| 16. | "Andalouse" (Acoustic version) | Mir; Dessart; Khaled | The Bionix | 1:44 |

2015 re-release bonus tracks
| No. | Title | Writer(s) | Producer(s) | Length |
|---|---|---|---|---|
| 14. | "Conmigo" | Mir; Dessart; Khaled | | 3:03 |
| 15. | "Les richesses du cœur" | Mir; Dessart; Khaled | | 3:30 |
| 16. | "La bohème" | Aznavour; Plante | | 3:21 |
| 17. | "One Last Time (Attends-Moi)" (Ariana Grande featuring Kendji Girac) | David Guetta; Savan Kotecha; Giorgio Tuinfort; Rami Yacoub; Carl Falk; Khaled | Falk; Rami; Ilya^{[a]}; Tuinfort^{[a]}; Kotecha^{[b]} | 3:14 |
| 18. | "Ella m'a aimé" (Radio edit) | Ahlalou; Koua | Nyadjiko; Skalpovich | 3:28 |

Notes

- ^{^[a]} signifies a co-producer
- ^{^[b]} signifies a vocal producer

== Charts ==
=== Weekly charts ===
Weekly chart performance for Kendji
| Chart (2014–2015) | Peak position |
|---|---|
| Belgian Albums (Ultratop Flanders) | 119 |
| Belgian Albums (Ultratop Wallonia) | 1 |
| Dutch Albums (Album Top 100) | 53 |
| French Albums (SNEP) | 1 |
| Swiss Albums (Schweizer Hitparade) | 22 |

=== Year-end charts ===
Year-end chart performance for Kendji
| Chart (2014) | Position |
|---|---|
| Belgian Albums (Ultratop Wallonia) | 24 |
| French Albums (SNEP) | 2 |
| Chart (2015) | Position |
| Belgian Albums (Ultratop Wallonia) | 1 |
| French Albums (SNEP) | 3 |
| Swiss Albums (Schweizer Hitparade) | 34 |
| Chart (2016) | Position |
| Belgian Albums (Ultratop Wallonia) | 30 |

== Certifications ==
Certifications for Kendji
| Region | Certification | Certified units/sales |
|---|---|---|
| Belgium (BRMA) | Platinum | 30,000^{*} |
| France (SNEP) | 3× Diamond | 1,500,000^{‡} |
| Switzerland (IFPI Switzerland) | Gold | 10,000^{^} |
^{*} Sales figures based on certification alone.^{^} Shipments figures based on certification alone.^{‡} Sales+streaming figures based on certification alone.
