= Du rire aux larmes =

Studio album by Sniper
- Released: January 29, 2001
- Genre: French hip hop
- Length: 67:08

Sniper chronology
Du rire aux larmes (2001)	Gravé dans la roche (2003)

Du rire aux larmes (French for 'from laughter to tears') was the 2001 debut album by the French hip hop group Sniper. It was published on the Desh Musique record label. The album contained the track La France, which was later fiercely attacked by the French interior minister Nicolas Sarkozy.

== Track listing ==
1. "Intro" – (1:32)
2. "Sniper processus" – (4:18)
3. "Pris pour cible" – (4:04)
4. "Faut de tout pour faire un monde" – (4:48)
5. "Intro Le crew est de sortie" – (0:29)
6. "Le crew est de sortie" – (4:31)
7. "Intro Tribal poursuite" – (0:41)
8. "Tribal poursuite" – (4:41)
9. "La France" – (6:18)
10. "Intro Du rire aux larmes" – (1:04)
11. "Du rire aux larmes" – (5:01)
12. "Aketo vs Tunisiano" – (4:04)
13. "La sentence" – (4:01)
14. "Quand on te dit" featuring J-Mi Sissoko - (3:56)
15. "Aketo solo" – (4:15)
16. "Fait divers" – (5:01)
17. "La rumba" – (4:19)
18. "On s'en sort bien" – (4:05)
