= Bionix =

Bionix may refer to:

- Bionix (TV programming block), a program block on the Canadian channel YTV
- Air Creation BioniX, a French ultralight trike wing design
- AOI: Bionix, a 2001 album by De La Soul, and its title song
- Bionix AFV, a family of Singaporean armoured fighting vehicles
- The Bionix, a Belgian music production team; see 2014 album Aznavour, sa jeunesse

== See also ==
- BionX, a Canadian e-bike electric assist motor manufacturer
