= Mi Vida (Kendji Girac album) =

Studio album by Kendji Girac
- Released: 9 October 2020
- Length: 38:56
- Language: French
- Label: Island Def Jam
- Producer: Renaud Rebillaud

Kendji Girac chronology
Amigo (2018)	Mi Vida (2020)	L'école de la vie (2022)

Singles from Mi Vida
- 1. "Habibi" Released: 11 June 2020; 2. "Dernier métro" Released: 28 August 2020; 3. "Évidemment" Released: 17 December 2020; 4. "Bebeto" Released: 16 July 2021; 5. "Dans mes bras" Released: 25 August 2021; 6. "Conquistador" Released: 9 December 2021

Mi Vida is the fourth studio album by French singer Kendji Girac. It was released on 9 October 2020 by Island Def Jam.

== Singles ==
"Habibi" was released as the lead single from the album on 11 June 2020. "Dernier métro" was released as the second single on 28 August 2020. "Évidemment" was released as the third single from the album on 17 December 2020. A remix of "Bebeto" was released as the fourth single from the album on 16 July 2021. "Dans mes bras" was released as the fifth single on 25 August 2021. "Conquistador" was released as the sixth single from the album on 9 December 2021.

== Track listing ==
Mi Vida track listing
No.	Title	Length
1.	"Habibi"	3:32
2.	"Dernier métro" (with Gims)	3:43
3.	"Évidemment"	3:57
4.	"Conquistador"	3:42
5.	"Dans mes bras" (with Dadju)	3:16
6.	"Yelele"	3:18
7.	"La magicienne"	3:35
8.	"Bebeto" (with Soolking)	3:25
9.	"Andale"	3:13
10.	"Reggaeton"	3:07
11.	"Oh ! Prends mon âme"	4:08

February 2021 reissue
No.	Title	Length
12.	"Dans mes bras" (version acoustique)	3:12
13.	"Evidemment" (version acoustique)	3:51
14.	"Habibi" (version acoustique)	3:14

July 2021 reissue
No.	Title	Length
15.	"Bebeto (Remix)" (with Soolking and Naps featuring Soprano)	3:57

November 2021 reissue
No.	Title	Length
16.	"La Gitane – Souvenirs d'enfance" (Deezer originals)	3:53
17.	"Petit papa Noël"	3:49

== Charts ==
=== Weekly charts ===
Weekly chart performance for Mi Vida
Chart (2020)	Peak position
Belgian Albums (Ultratop Flanders)	83
Belgian Albums (Ultratop Wallonia)	1
French Albums (SNEP)	2
Swiss Albums (Schweizer Hitparade)	5

=== Year-end charts ===
2020 year-end chart performance for Mi Vida
Chart (2020)	Position
Belgian Albums (Ultratop Wallonia)	25
French Albums (SNEP)	20

2021 year-end chart performance for Mi Vida
Chart (2021)	Position
Belgian Albums (Ultratop Wallonia)	26
French Albums (SNEP)	23

2022 year-end chart performance for Mi Vida
Chart (2022)	Position
Belgian Albums (Ultratop Wallonia)	95
French Albums (SNEP)	82

== Certifications ==
Region	Certification	Certified units/sales
Belgium (BRMA)	Platinum	20,000^{‡}
France (SNEP)	3× Platinum	300,000^{‡}
^{‡} Sales+streaming figures based on certification alone.

== Release history ==
Release dates and formats for Mi Vida
Region	Date	Format	Version	Label	Ref.
France	9 October 2020	CD	Standard	Island Def Jam	
France	16 October 2020	LP	Standard	Island Def Jam	
France	12 February 2021	CD	Nouvelle edition	Island Def Jam	
France	12 November 2021	CD	Edition de Noël	Island Def Jam	
