= Vivre =

Vivre can refer to:

- Vivre, the German name for the album The Best of Celine Dion
- "Vivre" (Carole Vinci song), the Swiss entry to the Eurovision Song Contest 1978
- "Vivre" (Guy Bonnet song), the French entry to the Eurovision Song Contest 1983
- "Vivre" (Notre-Dame de Paris song), a 1998 French song from the musical Notre Dame de Paris, covered in 1999 in English by Celine Dion
- Vivre..., 2024 album by Kendji Girac
