= Addicted to You =

Addicted to You may refer to:

- "Addicted to You" (Alec Empire song)
- "Addicted to You" (Anthony Callea song)
- "Addicted to You" (Avicii song)
- "Addicted to You" (Hikaru Utada song)
- "Addicted to You" (Laura Voutilainen song)
- "Addicted to You" (LeVert song)
- "Addicted to You" (Shakira song)

== See also ==
- Addicted to Love (disambiguation)
- Addicted (disambiguation)
