= Addicted to Your Love (disambiguation) =

"Addicted to Your Love" is a 2014 single by The Shady Brothers.

Addicted to Your Love may also refer to:

- "Addicted to Your Love", single by The Gap Band from Round Trip, #8 R&B chart
- "Addicted to Your Love", by Muscle Shoals Horns from Fizzyology
