= Kendji Girac =

French singer (born 1996)

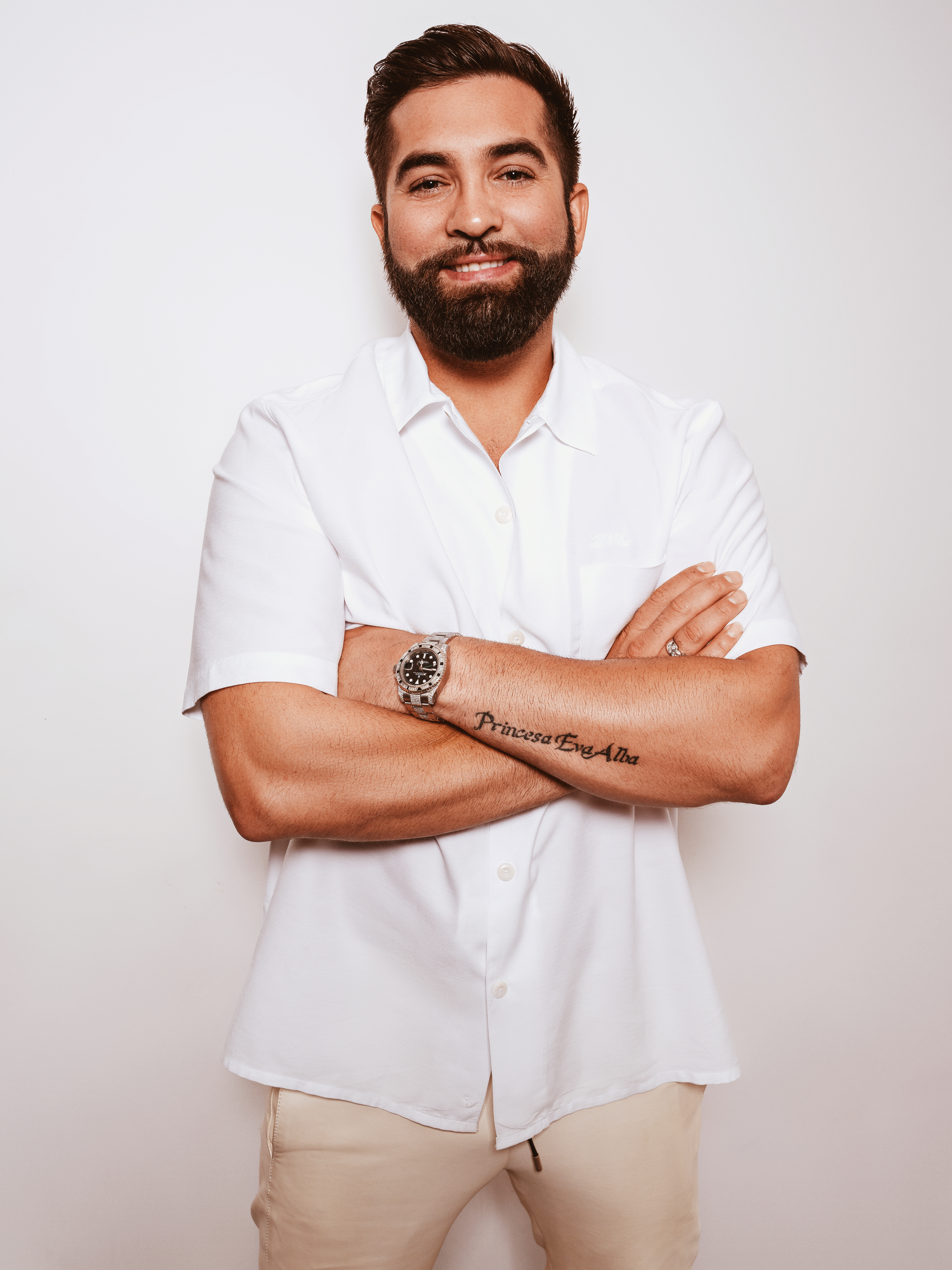
- Girac in 2022

Background information
- Born: Kendji Jason Maillié; 3 July 1996 (age 30); Périgueux, Aquitaine, France
- Genres: Pop; flamenco
- Occupation: Singer
- Years active: 2014–present
- Label: Mercury

Kendji "Girac" Jason Maillié (French pronunciation: [kɛndʒi ʒiʁak dʒɛzɔn maje]; born 3 July 1996), also known mononymously as Kendji, is a French singer. He is the winner of season 3 of the music competition The Voice: la plus belle voix as part of Team Mika. He has released six studio albums, Kendji, Ensemble, Amigo, Mi Vida, L'école de la vie, and Vivre... as well as a string of hit singles.

== Biography ==
=== Beginnings ===
The youngest of a Catalan Gitano family, Kendji grew up in Saint-Astier and was taught to play the guitar and sing by his grandfather. He left school at 16 to follow the family business as an arborist. He speaks Catalan with his parents. He gained some fame through publishing materials online. His Romanes version of "Bella" by Gims filmed by a friend went viral. His video garnered 5.8 million views. Another popular song he uploaded was "Si j'étais président", a cover of Gérard Lenorman.

=== The Voice ===
For season 3 of The Voice: la plus belle voix, he auditioned with the song "Bella" by Maître Gims in the second episode of season 3, broadcast on 18 January, with only judge Mika turning his chair, whereas the three others, Florent Pagny, Jenifer and Garou refrained.

In the Musical Battles Round broadcast on 8 March 2014, Mika put him against Youness both singing "Tous les mêmes" by Stromae. Kendji moved to "L'épreuve ultime" round, in which he performed "Hotel California by The Eagles in the 29 March 2014 emission.

In the live rounds he performed "Ma philosophie" by Amel Bent (5 April 2014), "Mad World" from Tears for Fears (19 April 2014) and "Allumer le feu" by Johnny Hallyday (19 April 2014). In the semi-final on 3 May 2014, he sang "Belle" by Garou and Daniel Lavoie qualified for the finals as Team Mika's finalist.

=== Career ===
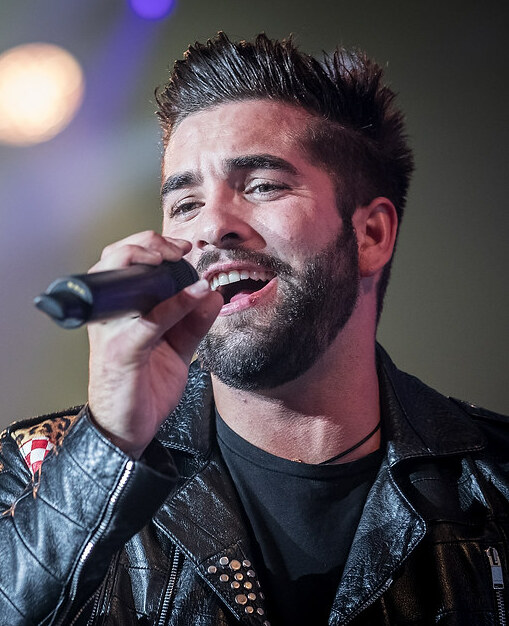
Girac on stage in 2016

His first official single the bilingual French/Spanish "Color Gitano", was released in June 2014 from his eponymous EP, followed by his official album release in September. In December 2014, he won two NRJ Music Awards for Francophone Breakthrough of the Year and "Color Gitano" as Francophone Song of the Year. His album Kendji sold 600,000 copies by January 2015, and over 1 million copies by October 2015, certifying Diamond and becoming France's second-highest selling album of 2014 after Racine carrée by Stromae. He is currently the biggest-selling The Voice alumnus worldwide. His follow-up single "Andalouse" proved even more successful commercially. Other notable singles included "Conmigo" from the repackaged version of Kendji released on 4 May 2015.

A second album titled Ensemble was released on 30 October 2015. Notable singles from his second album include "Me Quemo", "Les yeux de la mama" and "No Me Mires Más" (jointly with Soprano).

On 31 August 2018, his third album, titled Amigo was released. It started at number one on the French sales chart with 48,408 sales.

On 22 August 2020, he joined the cast of The Voice Kids France, becoming the first French former contestant to join the jury of the French franchise of the show, alongside Jenifer, Patrick Fiori, and Soprano.

=== Charity work ===
In 2017, Kendji joined the Enfoirés, a team of artists involved in supporting the charity Restos du Coeur, which hosts yearly concerts to raise money for one of France's main soup kitchen networks.

== Discography ==
=== Studio albums ===
Title	Album details	Peak chart positions					Sales	Certifications
Title	Album details	FRA	BEL (Fl)	BEL (Wa)	NLD	SWI	Sales	Certifications
Kendji	Released: 8 September 2014; Label: Mercury; Formats: CD, digital download	1	119	1	53	22	FRA: 1,500,000 (incl. streaming)	SNEP: 3× Diamond
Ensemble	Released: 30 October 2015; Label: Mercury; Formats: CD, digital download	1	88	1	—	1	FRA: 1,000,000 (incl. streaming)	SNEP: 2× Diamond
Amigo	Released: 31 August 2018; Label: Mercury; Formats: CD, digital download	1	69	1	—	7	FRA: 350,000 (incl. streaming)	SNEP: 3× Platinum
Mi Vida	Released: 9 October 2020; Label: Mercury; Formats: CD, digital download, LP	2	83	1	—	5		
L'école de la vie	Released: 11 November 2022; Label: Mercury; Formats: Digital download, LP	1	—	3	—	11		
Vivre...	Released: 4 October 2024; Label: Mercury; Formats: Digital download, LP	3	—	3	—	14		

=== Live albums ===
Title	Album details	Peak chart positions	
Title	Album details	FRA	BEL (Wa)
Ensemble / Le Live	Released: 17 March 2017; Label: U.L.M. / Mercury; Formats: CD, digital download	15	5

=== Other album releases ===
Title	Album details	Peak chart positions
Title	Album details	FRA
Kendji / Ensemble / Kendji Girac, de l'ombre à la lumière	Released: 20 May 2016; Label: U.L.M. / Mercury; Formats: CD	123
Kendji / Ensemble	Released: 18 August 2017; Label: U.L.M. / Mercury; Formats: CD	69
L'Intégrale	Released: 29 November 2019; Label: U.L.M. / Mercury; Formats: CD, download, streaming	53

=== EPs ===
Title	EP details	Peak chart positions	Notes
Title	EP details	FRA	Notes
Kendji Girac EP	Released: 1 January 2014; Label: Mercury Records; Formats: digital download	44	Tracklist: 1. "Color Gitano" (3:30); 2. "Toi et moi" (3:06); 3. "Bella" (3:56); 4. "Ma philosophie" (3:23); 5. "Tous les mêmes" (2:37); 6. "Elle m'a aimé" (3:25)

=== Singles ===
==== As lead artist ====
List of singles, with selected chart positions
Title	Year	Peak chart positions				Album
Title	Year	FRA	BEL (Fl)	BEL (Wa)	POL	Album
"Color Gitano"	2014	11	—	12	—	Kendji
"Cool"	2014	20	—	17	—	Kendji
"Andalouse"	2014	3	14* (Ultratip)	3	10	Kendji
"Elle m'a aimé"	2014	22	—	53*	—	Kendji
"Je m'abandonne"	2014	25	—	—	—	Kendji
"La bohème"	2014	61	—	—	—	Aznavour, sa jeunesse
"Conmigo"	2015	7	—	6	—	Kendji (2015 reissue)
"Les richesses du cœur"	2015	57	—	—	—	Kendji (2015 reissue)
"Me Quemo"	2015	7	—	8	—	Ensemble
"Les yeux de la mama"	2015	5	—	—	—	Ensemble
"No me mirès màs" (with Soprano)	2016	9	—	11	—	Ensemble
"Sonrisa"	2016	25	—	42	—	Ensemble
"Ma câlina"	2017	40	—	15	—	Ensemble
"L'envie"	2017	53	—	26* (Ultratip)	—	Non-album single
"Maria Maria"	2018	8	—	19	—	Amigo
"Pour oublier"	2018	7	23* (Ultratip)	3	—	Amigo
"Tiago"	2018	12	34* (Ultratip)	5	—	Amigo
"Tu vas manquer"	2020	—	—	10* (Ultratip)	—	Amigo
"Habibi"	2020	109	—	2* (Ultratip)	—	Mi Vida
"Dernier métro" (featuring Gims)	2020	79	—	11	—	Mi Vida
"Dans mes bras" (with Dadju)	2021	43	—	12	—	Mi Vida
"Conquistador"	2021	—	—	32	—	Mi Vida
"Eva"	2022	104	—	14	—	L'école de la vie
"Desperado"	2023	—	—	29	—	L'école de la vie
"Le feu" (with Vianney)	2023	29	—	9	—	L'école de la vie
"Je suis fou" (with Vianney and Soprano)	2023	61	—	42	—	À 2 à 3
"Si seulement..."	2024	38	—	16	—	Vivre...
"J'ai changé"	2025	—	—	41	—	Vivre...
"Un, dos, tres"	2025	—	—	19	—	Vivre...Encore
"Oublier"	2025	—	—	47	—	Vivre...Encore

*Did not appear in the official Belgian Ultratop 50 charts, but rather in the bubbling under Ultratip charts.

==== As featured artist ====
List of singles, with selected chart positions
Title	Year	Peak chart positions		Album
Title	Year	FRA	BEL (Wa)	Album
"One Last Time (Attends-moi)" (Ariana Grande featuring Kendji Girac)	2015	11	—	My Everything and Kendji (2015 Reissue)
"Fais comme ça" (Vitaa and Slimane featuring Kendji Girac)	2019	—	—	VersuS

=== Other charted songs ===
Title	Year	Peak chart positions		Album
Title	Year	FRA	BEL (Wa)	Album
"Amor de mis amores" / "Volare" (credited as Kendji)	2014	94	—	The Voice 3 - La Plus Belle Voix (2014)
"Belle" (credited as Kendji)	2014	96	—	The Voice 3 - La Plus Belle Voix (2014)
"Mi amor"	2014	118	—	Kendji
"Avec toi"	2014	179	—	Kendji
"Baïla amigo"	2014	187	—	Kendji
"Mon univers"	2014	192	—	Kendji
"Au sommet"	2014	—	—	Kendji
"Ma solitude"	2015	130	—	Ensemble
"C'est trop"	2015	142	—	Ensemble
"Besame"	2015	198	—	Ensemble
"Tu y yo"	2016	153	8* (Ultratip)	Ensemble
"Elle a tout"	2016	80	—	Ensemble
"Jamais à genoux"	2016	85	—	Ensemble
"Que Dieu me pardonne" (with Claudio Capéo)	2018	133	31	Amigo
"Dans mes bras" (with Dadju)	2020	119	—	Mi Vida
"Évidemment"	2021	87	13	Mi Vida
"Bebeto" (with Soolking)	2021	33	10	Mi Vida

*Did not appear in the official Belgian Ultratop 50 charts, but rather in the bubbling under Ultratip charts.

== Awards ==
Year	Award	Song
2014	NRJ Music Awards/Francophone Song of the Year	"Color Gitano"
2014	NRJ Music Awards/Francophone Breakthrough of the Year	"Color Gitano"
2015	NRJ Music Awards/Nominated for Best French Male Artist of the Year	Album Kendji

== Filmography ==
- 2017: Chacun sa vie et son intime conviction

Awards and achievements
Preceded by Yoann Fréget	The Voice: la plus belle voix Winner; 2014	Succeeded by Lilian Renaud
