= Color Gitano =

2014 single by Kenji Girac

Single by Kendji Girac

from the album Kendji
- Language: French; Spanish
- English title: Gypsy Colors
- Released: 16 June 2014
- Recorded: 2014
- Genre: Flamenco; folk
- Length: 3:32
- Label: Mercury Records
- Songwriter(s): François Welgryn; Renaud Rebillaud; Mendes The Dude
- Producer(s): Renaud Rebillaud; Mendes The Dude

Kendji Girac singles chronology
"Color Gitano" (2014)	"Andalouse" (2014)

Music video
- "Color Gitano" on YouTube

"Color Gitano" (Spanish: [koˈloɾ xiˈtano]; lit. 'Gypsy Colors') is the debut single by French singer Kendji Girac, the winner of French season 3 of the French music competition series The Voice: la plus belle voix broadcast from January 11 to May 10, 2014 as part of Team Mika.

"Color Gitano" is a bilingual song in French and Spanish and is heavily influenced by Andalusian culture and gypsy music tradition.

== Chart positions ==
=== Weekly charts ===
Chart (2014)	Peak position
Belgium (Ultratop 50 Wallonia)	12
France (SNEP)	11

=== Year-end charts ===
Chart (2014)	Position
France (SNEP)	51
Chart (2015)	Position
Belgium (Ultratop Wallonia)	45
France (SNEP)	72
