= Blacko (singer) =

French singer and hip hop artist of Réunion origin

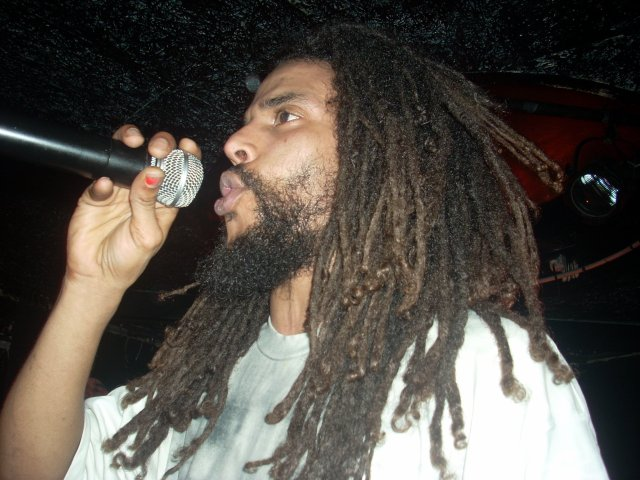

Background information
- Birth name: Karl Appela
- Also known as: Blacko; Afrikaf; Tikaf Lakour; Solitary Lion; Black Renega
- Born: 5 February 1979 (age 46); Montfermeil, France
- Genres: Ragga, rap, reggae
- Occupation: Singer
- Labels: LoudSchool Productions Because Music

Karl Appela better known as Blacko, also known as Afrikaf, Tikaf Lakour, Solitary Lion and Black Renega (born in Montfermeil, Seine-Saint-Denis, France on 5 February 1979) is a French singer and hip hop artist of Réunion origin. He was member of the hip hop group Sniper from 1997 until his departure in July 2007. After his split, he has moved to solo performances.

== Career ==
He started performing at the age of 12 and sang with the American rapper Issa Dina when he was just 16. With his friends, he formed a hip hop formation called KDM (Killer du Microphone) in South of France. Moving to Deuil-la-Barre in 1995, he was associated with the A.R. Possee group and later at 15, Kaotik.

His association in the hip hop collective Comité de Deuil and his meeting with Tunisiano resulted in created the character Personnalité Suspecte and thanks to his skills in ragga hip-hop, he became a noteworthy part of the collective with M Group piece "9.5.1.7.0."

In 1997, he became part of the hip hop group Sniper with musical event FrancoFolies in La Rochelle. Sniper included Blacko in addition to Tunisiano (Bachir Baccour), Aketo (Ryad Selmi) and initially DJ Boudj. The group mixed rap, reggae and songs in its repertoire. DJ Boudj left after the initial two albums, Du rire aux larmes (2001) and Gravé dans la roche (2003). With Dj Boudj leaving, the remaining trio had two more albums Trait pour trait and À toute épreuve in 2006. A final tour in 2007 would mark the end of Sniper.

Even prior to break-off in 2005, he had success with a joint work with 113 in "Un jour de paix". Immediately upon break-off of Sniper in 2007, he was featured in French rapper Soprano's hit "Ferme les yeux et imagine toi". This gave him great exposure as a solo artist. In 2009, his first solo reggae album Enfant du soleil halted with the Desh Musique label refusing its release. Instead Blacko took part in Kool Shen's 2009 album Eldorado. In 2010, he released his 17 track album Enfant du soleil independently online, explaining his fall-off with Desh Musique and his musical orientation for ragga and reggae. This created further legal problems with the label through the courts. End of 2011, he released an EP of 5 title under the title Instin Kaf made available for free downloads. In 2014, his single "Le temps est compté" has charted on SNEP, the official French singles chart.

== Discography ==
=== Albums ===
with Sniper

- 2001: Du rire aux larmes
- 2003: Gravé dans la roche
- 2006: Trait pour trait
- 2006: À toute épreuve

Solo

Year	Album	Peak positions		Notes
Year	Album	FR	BEL (Wa)	Notes
2010	Enfant du soleil	–	–	Independent album
2015	Dualité	26	149	Independent album

=== EPs ===
Year	Single	Peak positions	Album
Year	Single	FR	Album
2011	Instin Kaf (EP) (independent)	–	
2015	Le temps est compté (EP)	23	

=== Singles ===
with Sniper

- 2001: "Pris pour cible"
- 2001: "Quand on te dit"
- 2002: "Du rire aux larmes"
- 2002: "On s'en sort bien"
- 2003: "Gravé dans la roche"
- 2003: "Sans (re)pères"
- 2006: "Trait pour trait"

Others

- 2005: "Un jour de paix" (with 113)
- 2006: "Être un homme" featuring Krys

Solo

Year	Single	Peak positions		Album
Year	Single	FR	BEL (Wa)	Album
2014	"Le temps est compté"	15	11* (Ultratip)	
2015	"Préviens-les"	147	–	
2015	"Accroché à mes rêves"	119	–	
2015	"Fantômes" (Mac Tyer / Blacko)	153	–	
2015	"Équilibre"	136	–	
2016	"No Stress"	33	–	

*Did not appear in the official Belgian Ultratop 50 charts, but rather in the bubbling under Ultratip charts.

Featured in

Year	Single	Peak positions	Album
Year	Single	FR	Album
2007	"Ferme les yeux et imagine toi" (Soprano feat. Blacko)	16	
2015	"I'm Not Rich" (The King's Son feat. Blacko)	20	

Others

- 2007: "Leur France" – Dragon Davy featuring Blacko
- 2010: "Femme de courage" – Atheena featuring Blacko
