= Conmigo (song) =

Single by Kendji Girac

from the album Kendji
- Released: March 18, 2015
- Genre: French hip hop; Dance-pop
- Length: 3:03
- Songwriter(s): Rachid Mir; Christian Dessart; Nazim Khaled
- Producer(s): The Bionix

Kendji Girac singles chronology
"One Last Time" (2015)	"Conmigo" (2015)	"Cool" (2015)

Music video
- "Conmigo" on YouTube

"Conmigo" is a song by French singer Kendji Girac from the album Kendji (2014). It peaked at number six and seven in Wallonia and France respectively.

== Charts ==
=== Weekly charts ===
Chart (2015)	Peak position
Belgium (Ultratop 50 Wallonia)	6
France (SNEP)	7

=== Year-end charts ===
Chart (2015)	Position
Belgium (Ultratop Wallonia)	27
France (SNEP)	41
