= Me Quemo =

Single by Kendji Girac

from the album Ensemble
- Language: French, Spanish
- English title: I'm Burning
- Released: 2 September 2015
- Genre: Pop
- Length: 3:15
- Songwriters: Felipe Saldivia; Frédéric Savio; Thomas Laroche; Kendji Girac
- Producers: Felipe Saldivia; Fred Savio

Kendji Girac singles chronology
"Les richesses du coeur" (2015)	"Me Quemo" (2015)	"Les yeux de la mama" (2015)

Music video
- "Me Quemo" on YouTube

"Me Quemo" is a song by Kendji Girac from the album Ensemble. It is the first single from Ensemble.

The song peaked at number 7 in the French charts and number 4 in the Belgian charts.

== Charts ==
=== Weekly charts ===
Chart (2015)	Peak position
Belgium (Ultratop 50 Wallonia)	4
France (SNEP)	7

=== Year-end charts ===
Chart (2015)	Position
Belgium (Ultratop Wallonia)	91

== Certifications ==
Region	Certification	Certified units/sales
France (SNEP)	Gold	100,000^{‡}
^{‡} Sales+streaming figures based on certification alone.
