= Ninja (Soprano song) =

Single by Soprano

from the album Phoenix
- Released: March 4, 2020
- Recorded: 2019
- Genre: Hip hop
- Length: 3:51
- Songwriter: Saïd M'Roumbaba
- Producer: Soprano

Soprano singles chronology
"A nos héros du quotidien" (2020)	"Ninja" (2020)	"Le Cœur holiday" (2020)

Music video
- "Ninja" on YouTube

"Ninja" is a song by French rapper Soprano. It was released on March 4, 2020, on YouTube.

== Charts ==
Chart (2020)	Peak position
Belgium (Ultratop 50 Wallonia)	32
France (SNEP)	37

== Certifications ==
Certifications for "Ninja"
Region	Certification	Certified units/sales
France (SNEP)	Diamond	333,333^{‡}
^{‡} Sales+streaming figures based on certification alone.
