= Aznavour, sa jeunesse =

Compilation album by various artists
- Released: 24 November 2014
- Genre: French music
- Label: Millenium Records (Barclay)
- Producer: The Bionix

Aznavour, sa jeunesse is a tribute album released on 24 November 2014 where a great number of younger French-language artists sing classic hits from Charles Aznavour. The album released under Millenium label, one of the affiliated Barclay Records label was made to coincide with the 90th birthday of the French Armenian artist born in 1924. The title of the album is also a nod to "Sa jeunesse...(Entre ses mains)", one of Aznavour's earliest singles.

The album produced by the Belgian music producers The Bionix (Christian Dessart and rachid Mir) contains 15 tracks with the participation of more than twenty artists. Thirteen tracks are personal interpretations of various artists to some chosen Aznavour classic hits. The album also contains a collective rendition "Sa jeunesse" with seven acts of the collective joining Charles Aznavour himself. The album also contains one original song with lyrics written by Aznavour personally and music by Indila titled "Mon fol amour".

== Track list ==
Track #	Song title	Performing artist	Length
1.	"Sa jeunesse"	Charles Aznavour with Matt Houston, The Shady Brothers, Vitaa, Elisa Tovati, Soprano, Black M & Amel Bent	4:09
2.	"Mon fol amour"	Indila	4:05
3.	"La bohème"	Kendji Girac	3:23
4.	"Emmenez-moi"	Vitaa	2:58
5.	"For Me, Formidable"	Matt Houston	2:11
6.	"À ma fille"	Grand Corps Malade	2:39
7.	"Désormais"	Ben l'Oncle Soul	4:02
8.	"She"	The Shady Brothers	2:14
9.	"La Mamma"	Yseult	4:03
10.	"Les deux pigeons"	Amel Bent	2:51
11.	"Ay! Mourir pour toi"	Oxmo Puccino	2:15
12.	"Yerushalaim"	John Mamann	1:39
13.	"Parce que"	Camelia Jordana	2:26
14.	"Et pourtant"	Joyce Jonathan	2:42
15.	"Hier encore "	Passi feat. Gregz	2:50

== Charts ==
Chart (2006)	Peak position
Ultratop Belgian (Wallonia) Albums Chart	75
SNEP French Albums Chart	28

=== Charting singles from the album ===
Year	Renaud song	Credited performer(s)	Peak positions	Ref
Year	Renaud song	Credited performer(s)	FRA	Ref
2014	"La boheme"	Kendji Girac	61	
