= Les yeux de la mama =

Single by Kendji Girac

from the album Ensemble
- Language: French
- English title: The Eyes of My Mama
- Released: 19 December 2015
- Genre: Pop
- Length: 3:22
- Label: ULM; Mercury; Universal
- Songwriters: Nazim Khaled; Johan Errami; Kendji Girac
- Producers: Felipe Saldivia; Fred Savio

Kendji Girac singles chronology
"Me Quemo" (2015)	"Les yeux de la mama" (2015)	"No Me Mires Más" (2016)

Music video
- "Les yeux de la mama" on YouTube

"Les yeux de la mama" is a song by Kendji Girac from the album Ensemble.

== Charts ==
=== Weekly charts ===
Chart (2015)	Peak position
Belgium (Ultratop 50 Wallonia)	8
France (SNEP)	5

=== Year-end charts ===
Chart (2016)	Position
France (SNEP)	140
