= One Last Time (Ariana Grande song) =

2015 single by Ariana Grande

Single by Ariana Grande

from the album My Everything
- B-side: "My Everything"
- Released: February 10, 2015
- Recorded: 2014
- Studio: Conway (Los Angeles, CA); Kinglet (Stockholm)
- Genre: Dance-pop; EDM
- Length: 3:17
- Label: Republic
- Songwriters: David Guetta; Savan Kotecha; Giorgio Tuinfort; Rami Yacoub; Carl Falk
- Producers: Carl Falk; Rami

Ariana Grande singles chronology
"Santa Tell Me" (2014)	"One Last Time" (2015)	"Adore" (2015)

Music video
- "One Last Time" on YouTube

Alternative cover
- French version artwork featuring Kendji Girac

Kendji Girac singles chronology
"Andalouse" (2014)	"One Last Time (Attends-moi)" (2015)	"Conmigo" (2015)

"One Last Time" is a song by American singer-songwriter Ariana Grande. It was released digitally by Republic Records on August 22, 2014, as the second promotional single from her second studio album, My Everything (2014). The song was sent to contemporary hit radio as the fifth and final single from the album on February 10, 2015. It was written by David Guetta, Savan Kotecha, Giorgio Tuinfort, Rami Yacoub, and Carl Falk. The song was produced by the latter two, with Tuinfort serving as a co-producer and Ilya serving both as a co-producer and vocal producer.

"One Last Time" is a dance-pop and EDM song. Its instrumentation consists of sampled drums and a synth line. The single reached the top-twenty in twelve countries, including Australia, Canada, France, the United Kingdom and the United States, where it became Grande's sixth top-twenty single on the US Billboard Hot 100. It was later certified sextuple platinum in Australia, and quadruple platinum in Canada, the United Kingdom, and the United States.

The song's accompanying music video was released on February 15, 2015, and was directed by Max Landis. It is visually presented as a found footage, similar to Landis's previous work. The video faced controversy due to its similarity to the music video for the Australian band SAFIA's single "You Are the One", with Grande and Landis being accused of intellectual property theft. Grande promoted the song with a live performance on The Tonight Show Starring Jimmy Fallon, the 2015 NBA All-Star Game halftime show, and during her first world tour, The Honeymoon Tour (2015).

A French version of the song featuring French singer Kendji Girac, alternatively titled "Attends-moi", was released on February 16, 2015, in France, Belgium and Switzerland. An Italian version of the song featuring Italian rapper Fedez was released on May 26, 2015, only in Italy. Grande re-released "One Last Time" as a charity single in June 2017, following the Manchester Arena bombing at her concert the previous month. It resulted in the song reaching a new peak of number 2 on the UK Singles Chart following the One Love Manchester concert, as well as reaching a new peak of number 15 in the Irish Singles Chart and peaking at number one in Scotland. Grande donated all proceeds from the re-release to the We Love Manchester Emergency Fund to aid the victims of the bombing and their families. Overall, the song reached a top-ten peak in Belgium, the Czech Republic, France, Italy, Lebanon, the Netherlands, Slovakia, the United Kingdom and the top-twenty of Australia, Canada, Denmark, Ireland, Spain, and the United States.

== Background and release ==
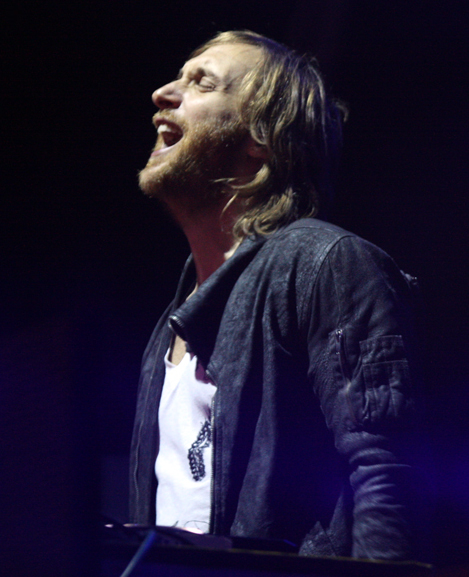
French DJ David Guetta (pictured in 2012) co-wrote "One Last Time".

"One Last Time" was written by the songwriting team Savan Kotecha, Rami Yacoub, and Carl Falk, with Dutch producer Giorgio Tuinfort and French disc jockey, David Guetta. Kotecha had previously collaborated with Grande when producing the singles from My Everything, "Problem", "Break Free", "Bang Bang", and "Love Me Harder". Guetta was working on his album Listen, and while making the album he chose to give "One Last Time" to Grande, since "[he] had like 120 songs and [was] trying to make an album that ma[de] sense because some of the songs can be great, but that doesn't mean that they would fit together. ['One Last Time' is] one example", he claimed. "One Last Time" was strongly considered to be My Everything's lead-single, according to Republic Records's executive vice president, Charlie Walk; however, "Problem" was chosen instead, being the song that best "set the tone for the project". Later, Walk claimed that "'Break Free' felt like summer", while "Bang Bang" helped usher in English singer Jessie J's album, Sweet Talker, and "fall/winter felt like the best time for 'Love Me Harder', since it's a heavier, darker record", he added.

Before being released as an official single, "One Last Time" was released for free via iTunes Stores as the album's second promotional single on August 22, 2014, following "Best Mistake", released on August 12. Ultimately, "One Last Time" was released as the album's fifth and final single, being serviced to rhythmic crossover and contemporary hit radio stations on February 10, 2015, in the US. The song was also released as a duet with French singer Kendji Girac. Titled "Attends-moi" ('Wait for Me'), it was released in Belgium, France, and Switzerland on February 16, 2015. It is included on the deluxe version of his debut studio album, Kendji (2015). According to Girac, the duet was arranged by his artistic director, since he and Grande share the same music corporation, Universal Music Group. On May 26, 2015, an Italian version of the song featuring Italian rapper Fedez was released in Italy. The song was re-released in June 2017 as a charity single, with proceeds being donated to the We Love Manchester Emergency Fund.

== Composition ==
"One Last Time"
A 20-second sample of "One Last Time"

"One Last Time" was produced by Falk and Yacoub, co-produced by Tuinfort and Ilya, with vocal production being done by Ilya, Kotecha and Yacoub. "One Last Time" is a dance-pop and EDM song, with a total length of three minutes and seventeen seconds (3:17). Its instrumentations consist in "pummeling drums and a three-note synth line". "One Last Time" is written in the key of A-flat major, with a moderately fast tempo of 125 beats per minute. Grande's vocals range from A♭_{3} to F_{5}. Lyrically, the song describes a female protagonist who asks her former lover to spend one last time with her, even though they have already moved on from her and is with someone new. As noted by Jason Lipshut of Billboard, "the downbeat admission of 'I know/that you got everything/But I got nothing here without you' is the pained sound of a narrator racked with guilt, the chorus sets aside that humiliation and scoops up a sense of hope," with the singer pleading, "One last time/I need to be the one who takes you home/One more time/I promise after that, I'll let you go". Rob Copsey of The Official Charts Company noted that the song " reminded him of Swedish's recording artist, Loreen's 2012 Eurovision winning song, "Euphoria".

== Critical reception ==
"One Last Time" received highly positive reviews. Stephen Thomas Erlewine of AllMusic picked the song as one of the album's highlights, while Jason Lipshut of Billboard praised the track for "demonstrat[ing] Grande's newfound maturity and ambition". Rob Copsey wrote for the Official Charts Company that 'One Last Time' "suits her better than you’d think, [with] the singer reign[ing] in her powerful pipes on this breezy and wistful club track". while Anne Zaleski of The A.V. Club thought the song "channels a more powerful version of On the 6-era Jennifer Lopez," also calling it an "electronica-dusted [song]". AXS's Lucas Villa praised her performance for "exud[ing] sincerity and grace" and added that "[t]his baby-come-back tune showcases a softer side to the singer that highlights her dulcet vocals." FDRMX writer John Mychal Feraren gave "One Last Time" a rating of 4.2 out of 5 stars, calling it "an excellent addition to her list of hit songs" and claiming that "its astounding musical production is effortlessly matched by [the] singer's sultry voice [...] transform[ing] an empty song into a masterpiece."

Mikael Wood, while reviewing the album for Los Angeles Times, called it a "delight [with] surging dance beats," while Digital Spy's Lewis Corner named it a "restrained sibling" of "Break Free", having "speckles of electronica to save it from falling into dwindling balladry". Jean-Luc Marsh of Pretty Much Amazing noted that the "otherworldly notes that Grande hits on 'One Last Time' and 'Why Try' remain standouts several listens through". Similarly, The National's Adam Workman claimed Grande is "far more effective when she leaves the musical school of 'why sing one note when you can stretch it out for several bars across three different octaves?'", citing the "lower-key" song as an example. Nick Levine of Time Out concluded that the song "serves club pop with a side of melancholy". In contrast, Evan Sawdey of PopMatters observed that the song "strikes all the dance-pop and EDM-lite poses it needs to without leaving any significant impression afterwards". The Guardian and Rolling Stone both ranked the song number six on their lists of the greatest Ariana Grande songs.

== Commercial performance ==
Prior to being serviced as a single, "One Last Time" initially appeared on the US Bubbling Under Hot 100 chart at number 11 in August 2014 as the second promotional single for the parent album. Following its impact to American radio formats, the song debuted at number 80 on the US Billboard Hot 100 for the week of February 28, 2015. It jumped to number 34 the following week, while trailing behind her own "Love Me Harder". The song later climbed to number 18, becoming Grande's fifth consecutive top-twenty single from the album and sixth career overall. "One Last Time" eventually peaked at number 13, on the week of May 2, 2015, becoming the only single from My Everything to not enter the top ten in the country, effectively ending Grande's streak of consecutive top ten hits from 2014. On the Mainstream Top 40 chart, the song peaked at number six, also becoming her fifth top ten single on the Pop charts. As of June 2020, "One Last Time" had sold 918,000 digital units in the US, and was certified Platinum by the RIAA. Similar to the US, the song has also become her fifth consecutive top-twenty single in Canada, peaking at number 12.

In Australia, "One Last Time" debuted on the ARIA Charts on the week of March 8, 2015 at number 27 and went on to reach a peak of number 15 on April 5, 2015, becoming her fifth top-twenty single there. Meanwhile, in New Zealand the song debuted at number 32, and a week later it peaked at number 22. It was higher than her previous single, "Love Me Harder", which peaked at number 28, and promotional single "Best Mistake", which charted at number 29.

Across Europe, "One Last Time" proved to be moderately successful initially. In France, both versions of the song charted; the original version of the song reached number ten, becoming her highest charting-single there (until "7 Rings" in 2019 which peaked at number two) and her first top-ten single [, while the French version, "Attends-moi" with Kendji Girac, debuted and peaked at number 11, becoming her highest single debut, second highest charting-single and third top-twenty there. In Italy, the song peaked at number six on the FIMI Singles Chart, becoming her first top-ten hit in that country, and was certified double platinum by the FIMI.

In the United Kingdom, "One Last Time" originally peaked at number 24 on the UK Singles Chart in early 2015, marking Grande's fourth top-forty single in the country, following number one singles "Problem" and "Bang Bang" as well as top-twenty single "Break Free". It was later certified gold by the BPI for reaching 400,000 sales+streaming figures.

=== Manchester Arena bombing and resurgence ===
In the wake of the Manchester Arena bombing, a resurgence of popularity and meaning for the single came as a homage to the victims of the incident, with Grande's fans starting petitions to get the song charting again. The song re-entered charts across several countries, including the UK, where it subsequently rose to a new peak of number two on the UK Singles Chart following the One Love Manchester benefit concert, as well as a new chart peak of number sixteen in Ireland, which was topped the week after by a chart move to number fifteen. It was certified platinum soon after, on June 9, 2017, by the BPI for selling over 600,000 copies, and then double platinum on February 23, 2018, for shipments of over 1.2 million copies in the country, her first single to do so; the BPI later certified it quadruple platinum on May 3, 2024. As of January 2024, "One Last Time" is Grande's best-selling song in the United Kingdom, having sold a total of 2,340,000 chart units across formats, as well as her third-most streamed song in the country with 223 million streams.

In Scotland, "One Last Time" also re-entered following the incident, and eventually topped the Scottish Singles chart on the issue dated June 9, 2017. The song also reached number 35 on the Australian ARIA Singles Chart, and number 23 in France and number 11 in Spain.

== Copyright infringement lawsuit ==
In August 2016, Alex Greggs filed a lawsuit against Grande, David Guetta, Rami Yacoub, Carl Falk, Universal Music Group and Republic Records for alleged copyright infringement of the song "Takes All Night" by Skye Stevens, which Greggs wrote. The lawsuit alleged that the "harmonic background remains the same in both songs for the entire sixteen measures of the chorus. ... Although the rhythm of the two compositions may differ ... there is substantial similarity on the most important rhythmic placement of the pitches on strong melodic and harmonic beats (1 and 3)". Greggs sought $150,000 per infringement. The case was later dismissed after both sides filed a Joint Stipulation for Dismissal.

== Music video ==
=== Background ===
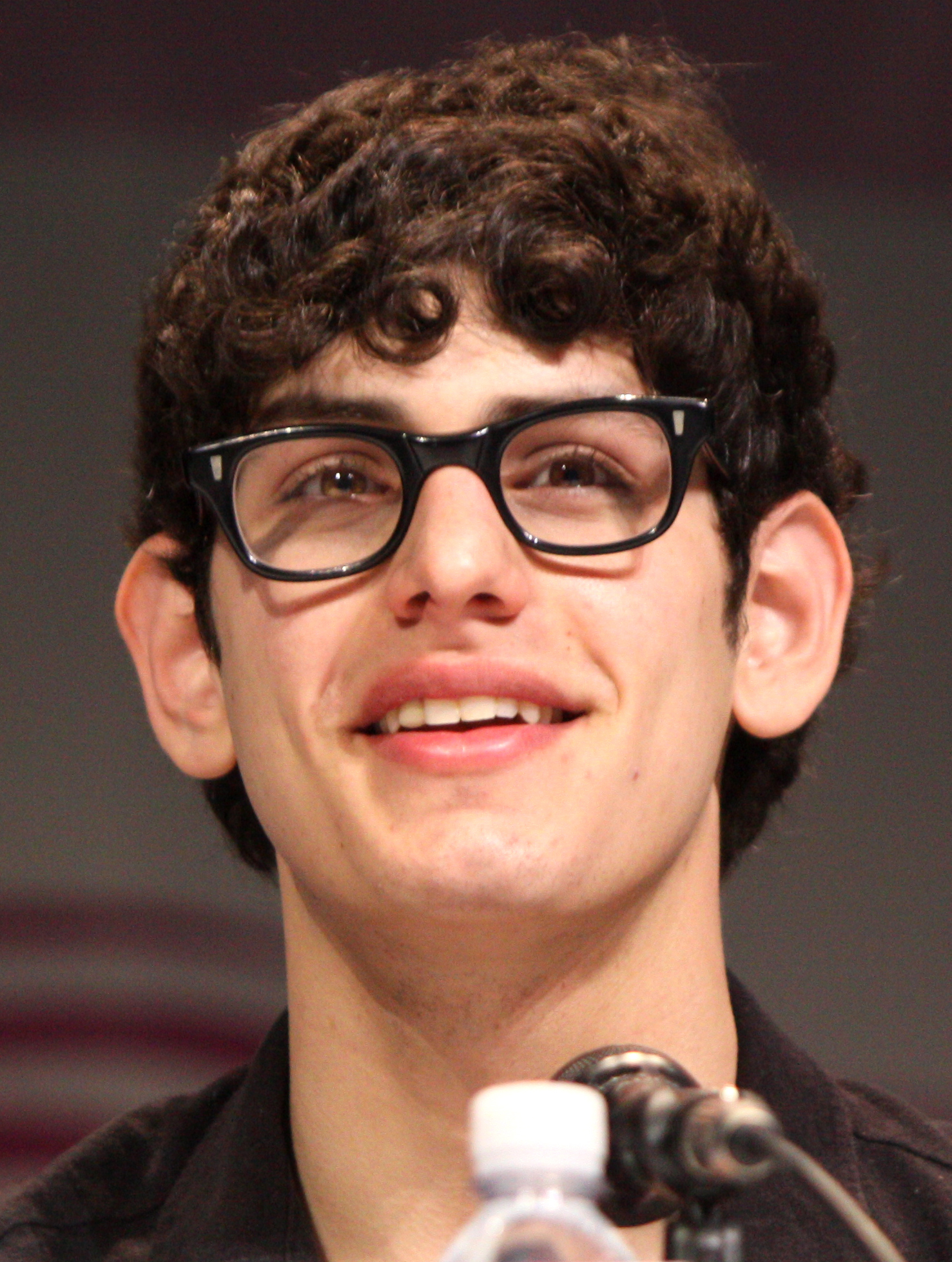
The music video stars Grande's Victorious co-star Matt Bennett.

Grande came up with the idea of the music video and contacted Max Landis, known for his and Josh Trank's 2012 film Chronicle. In an interview, Grande explained: "It's very unique, it's very different, I called Max [Landis] up and I said 'hey I want to do something that ends exactly like this' and I described the ending shot to him and then I said I also want it to be (a) one take [music video]… and I want the ending shot to look like this, And I described those two things to him and he’s like, 'wow, that's ambitious and it’s brave and it’s different, but let's try it". A day later, Grande discussed the video's concept and said that it was "the coolest concept ever and he killed it and it's very different. I'm very nervous about it because it's so unique and weird and I feel like brave and different, but it’s exciting".

The music video was filmed in early January 2015 and it also stars Matt Bennett, who was also Grande's co-star from the Nickelodeon sitcom Victorious. Max Landis also confirmed that one of the voices of the news reporters in the beginning of the video was actress Elizabeth Gillies, who also co-starred in Victorious with Grande and Bennett. Gillies previously appeared in Grande's music video for her single "Right There" (2013). Around that time, Max Landis revealed "One Last Time" as Grande's next single after tweeting, "Earth will pass catastrophically through the tail of the comet Eurydice in one week. Gather family and lovers close, one...last...time". The lyric video for "One Last Time" was released on Grande's official Vevo on February 6, 2015, at the same time it was announced that the music video was finished. On February 12, 2015, three days before the release of the music video, Grande released a teaser of the music video via Instagram. The music video was visually presented as a found footage, similar to Landis' previous work Chronicle. The "One Last Time" music video was released on February 15, 2015, on Vevo. It surpassed 100 million views on June 8, making it Grande's sixth Vevo-certified music video after "Love Me Harder".

=== Synopsis ===
The music video displays news anchor reports about the Earth on course to pass through the tail of a comet named Eurydice, as well as displaying a worldwide panic. The rest of the video then is presented through the use of a handheld video camera. Grande is in a Fiat car as the passenger, with her boyfriend (played by Matt Bennett), who is recording. They are stuck in traffic as they try to leave the city, implied to be Los Angeles, California. While everyone around them is panicking, Grande seems to be calm as she wants to get a closer look at the comet. Impatient, she leaves the car while Bennett tries to stop her, and then follows. They make their way through the crowds, but are stopped by the police who are barricading the street. Meanwhile, the comet erupts in the sky and begins to crash to the ground as the song starts. Grande manages to get through but Bennett is unable to, so he goes through an open ambulance and manages to catch up with her in an alleyway with stairs leading up into an apartment complex as Grande notices the comet in the sky. The two enter a home of a frightened family and try to leave through the other door, only for the comet to crash into the building, nearly killing both of them. Frightened, the two continue on and enter a room filled with television screens of the comet and an old man sitting at a desk. As the former two of them try to leave, the guy tries to stop them, but they knock him to the ground, and all the screens change to the same countdown timer. Grande and Bennett eventually make their way up the rooftop after subduing the old man again, who had caught up with them. The camera is then set down, and shows the two of them embracing each other one last time until the comet crashes down.

=== Reception and plagiarism allegations ===
Ariana Bacle of Entertainment Weekly called the music "very Chronicle", comparing the video to Max Landis' previous work. Rachel Paoletta of MTV News describes the music video as "a decidedly darker and more badass video" compared to her "sexy, sultry, and sandy video for 'Love Me Harder'". She also stated: "Ariana Grande's new video takes us to the end of the world, and brings us to the edge of our seats". In response to similarities between the Grande video and the music video accompanying Australian band SAFIA's single "You Are the One", Grande and Landis were accused of intellectual property theft. The controversy centered on similarities in the shared apocalyptic themes and stylistic format (a single, tracking shot) as well as parallels in the beginning of both videos (where a female protagonist exits a vehicle despite the protests of the male driver) and final shot (a lover's embrace as the world comes to an end around them). Members of the band described the similarities as an instance of when "big labels and/or big film firms steal ideas from small independent creatives who are trying really hard to make something different for a change". Despite acknowledging similarities between the two videos, Landis denied that his ideas are stolen from them and commented that both music videos had much in common with a third earlier music video by Perth group Injured Ninja.

== Live performances ==
Grande performed "One Last Time" for the first time live on The Tonight Show Starring Jimmy Fallon on February 1, 2015. She sang the song once more at the NBA All-Star Game halftime show on February 15, 2015, along with her other past hit songs. During "One Last Time", she introduced the song "with some fluttering notes that eventually congealed into an impressive melisma", as noted by Billboard's Jason Lipshut. "One Last Time" has also been on her setlists for the Honeymoon Tour and the Dangerous Woman Tour. During The Honeymoon Tour in Paris on May 15, 2015, Grande performed the French version of "One Last Time" with Kendji Girac for the first time. On May 27, 2015, she sang the song on the third season finale of The Voice of Italy.

On June 4, 2017, Grande performed "One Last Time", joined on-stage by other participating artists, as part of the finale of One Love Manchester, a benefit concert for the victims of the Manchester Arena bombing. Grande also performed the song during her BBC special aired end of 2018. From March 18 to April 5, 2019, Grande included "One Last Time" on her Sweetener World Tour setlist. An acoustic version of the song was later performed during her set at Manchester Pride on August 25.

Grande included the song on her Eternal Sunshine Tour setlist in 2026.

== Track listing ==
- Digital download

No.	Title	Length
1.	"One Last Time"	3:17

- Digital download – French version

No.	Title	Length
1.	"One Last Time (Attends-moi)" (featuring Kendji Girac)	3:14

- Digital download – Italian version

No.	Title	Length
1.	"One Last Time" (featuring Fedez)	3:18

- Digital download – Marshmello Remix

No.	Title	Length
1.	"One Last Time" (Marshmello remix)	4:29

== Credits and personnel ==
Credits were adapted from My Everything liner notes.

=== Recording and management ===
- Recorded at Conway Recording Studios (Los Angeles, California) and Kinglet Studios (Stockholm, Sweden)
- Mixed at MixStar Studios (Virginia Beach, Virginia)
- Mastered at Sterling Sound (New York City, New York)
- What a Publishing, Ltd., MXM Music (ASCAP) (administered by Kobalt), Piano Songs/Talpa Music (BUMA), Piano Music/Sony/ATV (BMI), Rami Productions/Team 2101 Songs (administered by Sony/ATV), Team 2101 Songs (administered by Sony/ATV)

=== Personnel ===
- Ariana Grande – lead vocals
- Carl Falk – songwriting, production, programming, guitars
- Rami – songwriting, production, vocal production, vocal editing, programming
- David Guetta – songwriting
- Giorgio Tuinfort – songwriting, co-production
- Savan Kotecha – songwriting, vocal production, background vocals
- Ilya – co-production for Wolf Cousins Productions, vocal production, vocal editing
- Peter Carlsson – vocal engineering
- Jeanette Olsson – background vocals
- Eric Weaver – engineering
- Serban Ghenea – mixing
- John Hanes – mixing engineering
- Tom Coyne – mastering
- Aya Merrill – mastering

== Charts ==
=== Weekly charts ===
2015–2017 weekly chart performance
Chart (2015–2017)	Peak position
Australia (ARIA)	15
Austria (Ö3 Austria Top 40)	55
Belgium (Ultratop 50 Flanders)	22
Belgium (Ultratop 50 Wallonia)	10
Canada Hot 100 (Billboard)	12
Canada AC (Billboard)	10
Canada CHR/Top 40 (Billboard)	3
Canada Hot AC (Billboard)	11
Czech Republic Airplay (ČNS IFPI)	36
Czech Republic Singles Digital (ČNS IFPI)	7
Denmark (Tracklisten)	19
Finland Airplay (Radiosoittolista)	19
France (SNEP)	10
France (SNEP) "One Last Time (Attends-moi)"	11
Germany (GfK)	60
Hong Kong (HKRIA)	19
Hungary (Stream Top 40)	14
Ireland (IRMA)	23
Italy (FIMI)	6
Japan Hot 100 (Billboard)	66
Lebanon Airplay (Lebanese Top 20)	9
Netherlands (Dutch Top 40)	8
Netherlands (Single Top 100)	11
New Zealand (Recorded Music NZ)	22
Norway (VG-lista)	22
Poland Airplay (ZPAV)	15
Scottish Singles Sales (Official Charts)	19
Slovakia Airplay (ČNS IFPI)	17
Slovakia Singles Digital (ČNS IFPI)	8
Sweden (Sverigetopplistan)	22
Switzerland (Schweizer Hitparade)	25
UK Singles (Official Charts)	24
US Billboard Hot 100	13
US Adult Pop Airplay (Billboard)	20
US Dance Airplay (Billboard)	4
US Dance Club Songs (Billboard)	39
US Pop Airplay (Billboard)	6
US Rhythmic Airplay (Billboard)	5

2017–2025 weekly chart performance
Chart (2017–2025)	Peak position
Australia (ARIA)	35
Czech Republic (Singles Digitál Top 100)	71
France (SNEP)	23
Ireland (IRMA)	15
Poland (Polish Airplay Top 100)	53
Scotland (OCC)	1
Spain (Promusicae)	11
UK Singles (OCC)	2

=== Year-end charts ===
Chart (2015)	Position
Australia (ARIA)	89
Belgium (Ultratop 50 Flanders)	79
Belgium (Ultratop 50 Wallonia)	24
Canada (Canadian Hot 100)	57
Denmark (Tracklisten)	71
France (SNEP)	33
Italy (FIMI)	28
Netherlands (Dutch Top 40)	49
Netherlands (Single Top 100)	47
Sweden (Sverigetopplistan)	69
UK Singles (Official Charts Company)	97
US Billboard Hot 100	67
US Dance/Mix Show Airplay (Billboard)	44
US Mainstream Top 40 (Billboard)	36
US Rhythmic Songs (Billboard)	34
Chart (2017)	Position
Japan Streaming Songs (Billboard Japan)	56
UK Singles (Official Charts Company)	38

=== Decade-end charts ===
Chart (2010–2019)	Position
UK Singles (Official Charts Company)	82

== Certifications ==
Region	Certification	Certified units/sales
Australia (ARIA)	6× Platinum	420,000^{‡}
Austria (IFPI Austria)	Platinum	30,000^{*}
Belgium (BRMA)	Gold	15,000^{*}
Brazil (Pro-Música Brasil)	Diamond	250,000^{‡}
Canada (Music Canada)	5× Platinum	400,000^{‡}
Denmark (IFPI Danmark)	2× Platinum	180,000^{‡}
France (SNEP)	Gold	75,000^{*}
Germany (BVMI)	Gold	200,000^{‡}
Hungary (MAHASZ)	Gold	1,500^{‡}
Italy (FIMI)	3× Platinum	150,000^{‡}
Japan (RIAJ)	Gold	100,000^{*}
New Zealand (RMNZ)	4× Platinum	120,000^{‡}
Norway (IFPI Norway)	3× Platinum	180,000^{‡}
Poland (ZPAV)	2× Platinum	40,000^{*}
Portugal (AFP)	Gold	10,000^{‡}
Spain (Promusicae)	Platinum	60,000^{‡}
Switzerland (IFPI Switzerland)	Gold	15,000^{‡}
United Kingdom (BPI)	4× Platinum	2,400,000^{‡}
United States (RIAA)	4× Platinum	4,000,000^{‡}
Streaming
Japan (RIAJ)	Platinum	100,000,000^{†}
Sweden (GLF)	3× Platinum	24,000,000^{†}
^{*} Sales figures based on certification alone.^{‡} Sales+streaming figures based on certification alone.^{†} Streaming-only figures based on certification alone.

== Release history ==
"One Last Time" release history
Country	Date	Format(s)	Version	Label	Ref.
United Kingdom	August 22, 2014	Digital download (as promotional single)	Original	Republic	
United States	February 10, 2015	Contemporary hit radio; rhythmic contemporary radio	Original	Republic	
Belgium	February 16, 2015	Digital download	French	Republic	
France	February 16, 2015	Digital download	French	Republic	
Switzerland	February 16, 2015	Digital download	French	Republic	
United States	March 16, 2015	Hot adult contemporary radio	Original	Republic	
Italy	May 26, 2015	Digital download	Italian	Republic	
Italy	May 26, 2015	Radio airplay	Italian	Universal	
Italy	May 29, 2015	Radio airplay	Remix	Universal	
Various	December 6, 2024	7-inch vinyl	Original	Republic	
