= Amigo (Kendji Girac album) =

Studio album by Kendji Girac
- Released: 31 August 2018
- Recorded: 2018
- Genre: Flamenco fusion, latin pop, folk pop, urban
- Language: French, Spanish
- Label: ULM, Mercury Records, Universal

Kendji Girac chronology
Ensemble (2015)	Amigo (2018)	Mi Vida (2020)

Singles from Amigo
- 1. "Maria Maria" Released: 20 April 2018; 2. "Pour oublier" Released: 22 June 2018; 3. "Tiago" Released: 19 October 2018

Amigo is the third studio album by Kendji Girac. It was released on 31 August 2018 with "Maria Maria" released as the debut single from the album. The tracks were mostly written by Girac himself and music composed by Renaud Rebillaud. Vianney contributed in 2 tracks. Damso, Felipe Saldivia, Fred Savio & Florian Rossi pitched in with various tracks as well. The album peaked the French Albums Chart and was certified 3× platinum in France.

Other singles from the album include "Pour oublier" and "Tiago" both in 2018. The album also has a collaboration with Claudio Capéo in the track "Que Dieu me pardonne".

== Track listing ==
Amigo track listing
No.	Title	Writer(s)	Length
1.	"Pour oublier"	Renaud Rebillaud & Vianney	3:36
2.	"Tiago"	Rebillaud & Vianney	2:58
3.	"Amigo"	Rebillaud	3:56
4.	"Laisse tomber"	Girac & Rebillaud	3:59
5.	"Que Dieu me pardonne" (feat. Claudio Capéo)	Girac & Rebillaud	3:31
6.	"Autour du feu"	Girac & Rebillaud	3:15
7.	"Maria Maria"	Damso, Girac, Felipe Saldivia, Fred Savio & Florian Rossi	3:11
8.	"Ma folie"	Girac, Savio & Saldivia	3:15
9.	"Tu vas manquer"	Girac & Rebillaud	3:05
10.	"Mi Amor"	Girac & Rebillaud	2:35
11.	"Si je pars"	Girac & Rebillaud	4:03
12.	"Ma bien aimée"	Girac & Rebillaud	3:04
13.	"Yo Cantare"	Girac, Savio & Saldivia	4:03

== Charts ==
=== Weekly charts ===
Chart (2018)	Peak position
Belgian Albums (Ultratop Flanders)	69
Belgian Albums (Ultratop Wallonia)	1
French Albums (SNEP)	1
Swiss Albums (Schweizer Hitparade)	7

=== Year-end charts ===
Chart (2018)	Position
Belgian Albums (Ultratop Wallonia)	12
French Albums (SNEP)	6
Chart (2019)	Position
Belgian Albums (Ultratop Wallonia)	22
French Albums (SNEP)	20
Chart (2020)	Position
Belgian Albums (Ultratop Wallonia)	175
French Albums (SNEP)	146

== Certifications ==
Region	Certification	Certified units/sales
France (SNEP)	3× Platinum	300,000^{‡}
^{‡} Sales+streaming figures based on certification alone.
