= Sniper (group) =

French hip hop band

- Origin: Val-d'Oise, France
- Genres: Hip hop
- Years active: 1997–present
- Labels: Desh Musique
- Members: Tunisiano; Aketo; Blacko
- Past members: DJ Boudj
- Website: www.officielsniper.com

Sniper is a French hip hop band formed in 1997 in Val-d'Oise. It currently consists of Tunisiano (Bachir Baccour), Aketo (Ryad Selmi) and Blacko. Afrikaf (Karl Appela) was also a member when the group formed in 2004. Blacko had left the band in 2007, but had returned in 2016.

== Beginnings ==
The members of Sniper first met at the 1997 Francofolies festival at La Rochelle. There, DJ Boudj and the three rappers, Aketo, Tunisiano and Blacko, met and decided to form the group, originally called Personnalité suspecte (Suspicious Character). This name was abbreviated to Persni and ended up as Sniper, an example of the French slang form, known as verlan.

The three members form a complementary group, as Aketo and El Tunisiano have developed more of a rap style and Blacko prefers an approach closer to reggae; meanwhile DJ Boudj takes care of the scratching. They began by making appearances on various mixes and compilations, such as The Power of Unity, Première classe (First Class) and B.O.S.S..

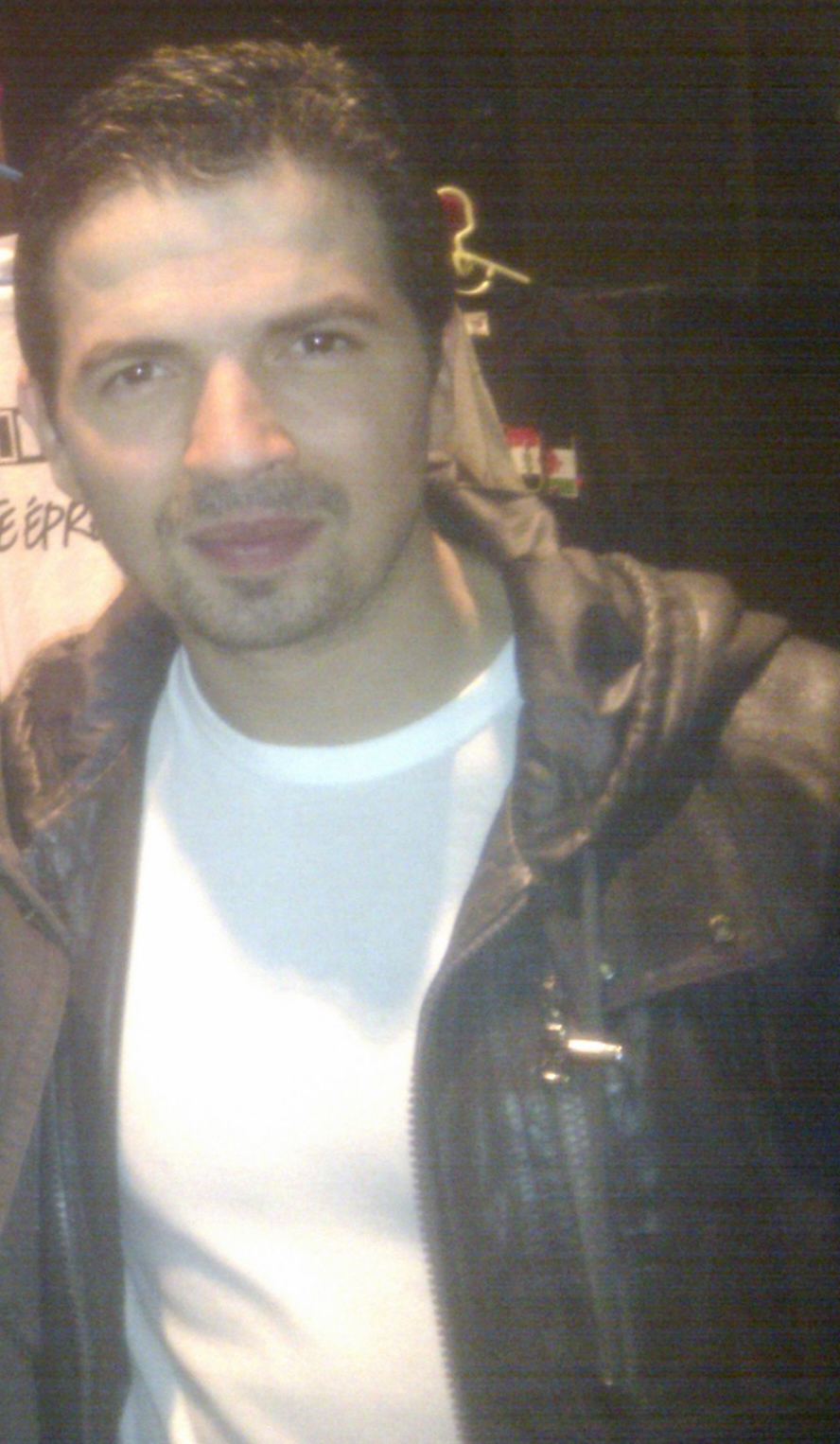
Tunisiano (Bachir Baccour)

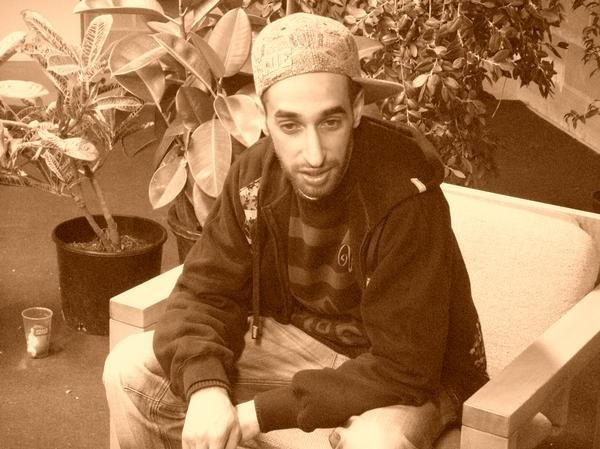
Aketo (Ryad Selmi)

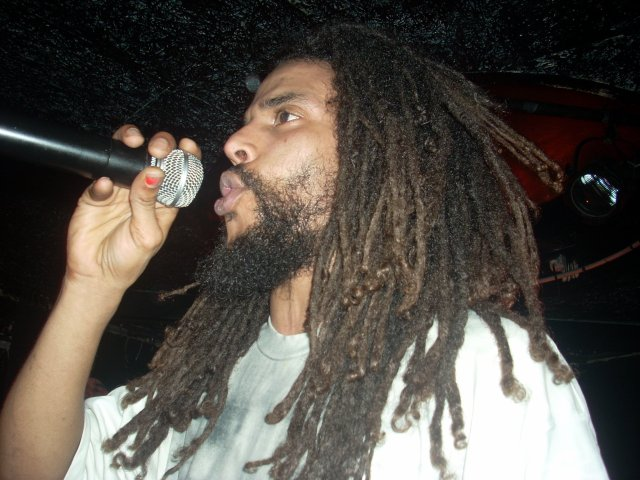
Blacko (Karl Appela)

== Career ==
Sniper's career officially began in January 2001, with the release of their first album, Du rire aux larmes (From laughter to tears) on the Desh Music label. The album title indicates the philosophy of the group: a mixture of humor (of a verbal tournament between Aketo and Tunisiano) and more serious texts ("Pris Pour Cible"), run in varied energetic tempos. Song topics can be found in everyday life: racism, exits, girls. They do not forsake the rap form but avoid contributing to the stereotype of rap music as ghetto music. The album went double gold with more than 250,000 albums sold.

In spring 2003, the group produced a more refined album, Gravé dans la roche (Carved in stone). This album covers many subjects like the Israeli–Palestinian conflict with "Jeteur de pierres" (Stone thrower), global warming on "Visions chaotiques" (Chaotic visions) or the idleness of certain young people in Trop vite" (Too fast). Lighter titles are not in "Processus 2003" and "Recette maison" (House recipe). The best known singles are "Sans (re)pères" (Without point/father) and "Gravé dans la roche" (Engraved in stone). "Panam All Starz" is a piece which gathers various artists of the Paris area, each one representing a department: Haroun (75th department), Mano Kid Mesa (77th), L'Skadrille (78th), Sinik and Diam's (91st), Salif and Zoxea (92nd), Tandem (93rd), 113 (94th) and Sniper (95th)

As the group's popularity grew, so did their fan base. This popularity showed in the second album which sold more than 400,000 copies, nearly double the sales of the previous album. This success was notably due to the fact that they were less crude and refined their lyrics in order to produce a quality album.

On 2 May 2006, Sniper returned to the French rap scene. A few weeks after its release, their album was placed a number 1 in sales. However, the group changed. DJ Boudj left Sniper. The reasons were not detailed but it would be considered to be an argument, ”as in any family", explained one of the remaining members of the group. At that time, the group marked a clear evolution reaching a certain maturity whose first steps had already been perceptible in their second album Gravé dans la roche.

With the album Trait pour trait, Sniper reached total sales of more than 1 million copies for all three albums and thus confirmed themselves as one of the best rap bands in France.

In three albums, Sniper convinced rap fans in France that they were interested in many quite different subjects, such as religion, international conflicts like Iraq–US, Palestine–Israel, or love, respect, resentment, various injustices and inequalities, immigration, the difficulties of life in the suburbs, the real/fake dream of the Western world and racism, etc.

The group is subject to heteroclite influences: old style rap, in particular under the influence of Aketo, as well as drawing from texts in Arabic, sung by Tunisiano, but also Blacko's reggae work.

The group confirmed that a fourth album would appear once they finished their respective solo albums. However, Blacko announced on 20 February 2008 that he had separated himself from the group since July 2007.

Sniper's fourth album À toute épreuve was released on 26 September 2011 in digital format and on 3 October 2011 in physical form.

In March 2016, the band announced that Blacko had rejoined the band. At a concert at La Cigale on May 28, 2016, they announced that they had started working on a new album. In January 2018 they confirmed that the album was nearly completed.

== Controversies ==
The group has had several legal battles, notably for their lyrics in songs such as "La France" and for a song on the conflict in the Middle East called "Jeteur de pierres'" (Stone thrower). The group was acquitted by the court of Rouen of charges based on "La France". They were later accused of antisemitism based on their treatment of the Israeli–Palestinian conflict on their second album, which provoked the ire of several Jewish organizations. The Minister of the Interior at the time, Nicolas Sarkozy, called them "ruffians who dishonor France".

== Discography ==
=== Albums ===
Year	Album	Peak positions		
Year	Album	FR	BEL (Wa)	SWI
2001	Du rire aux larmes	21	–	–
2003	Gravé dans la roche	3	20	25
2006	Trait pour trait	1	7	13
2011	À toute épreuve	5	41	–
2018	Personnalité suspecte vol. 1	–	38	50

Others

- 2006: Du rire aux larmes / Gravé dans la roche (special double release), (peaked at #91 in France)

=== Singles ===
Year	Single	Peak positions			Album
Year	Single	FR	BEL (Wa)	SWI	Album
2001	"Pris pour cible"	21	–	–	Du rire aux larmes
2001	"Quand on te dit"	47	–	–	Du rire aux larmes
2002	"Du rire aux larmes"	49	–	–	Du rire aux larmes
2002	"On s'en sort bien"	97	–	–	Du rire aux larmes
2003	"Gravé dans la roche"	5	–	29	Gravé dans la roche
2003	"Sans (re)pères"	10	–	46	Gravé dans la roche
2006	"Trait pour trait"	18	11	65	Trait pour trait
2011	"Fadela"	85	–	–	À toute épreuve
2011	"J'te parle" (feat. Soprano)"	55	–	–	À toute épreuve
2011	"Blood Diamondz" (feat. Sexion d'Assaut)	39	–	–	À toute épreuve

Featured

Year	Single	Peak positions			Album
Year	Single	FR	BEL (Wa)	SWI	Album
2006	"Bons moments" (L'Skadrille feat. Sniper)	19	–	80	
2011	"Paname Boss" (La Fouine feat. Sniper, Niro, Youssoupha, Canardo, Fababy, Sultan 7)	54	42	–	
