= Andalouse (song) =

Single by Kendji Girac

from the album Kendji
- Language: French
- English title: Andalusian Girl
- Released: 18 August 2014
- Recorded: 2014
- Genre: Dance; dance-pop
- Length: 2:49
- Label: Mercury Records
- Songwriters: Rachid Mir; Christian Dessart; Nazim Khaled
- Producer: The Bionix

Kendji Girac singles chronology
"Color Gitano" (2014)	"Andalouse" (2014)	"One Last Time (Attends-moi)" (2015)

Music video
- "Andalouse" on YouTube

"Andalouse" (French for "Andalusian girl") is a song recorded by French singer Kendji Girac. It was written by Rachid Mir, Christian Dessart and Nazim Khaled, being produced by The Bionix. The song was released by Mercury Records on 18 August 2014 as the lead single from Girac's debut eponymous album, Kendji. "Andalouse" is a dance-pop song with influences of Latin and Indian music, with the singer also having a conversation in Spanish.

The single was met with a strong commercial success in France and Belgium back in late 2014 peaking at number three, becoming Girac's the highest-charting single to date, and it has been certified gold by selling 75 copies in former country. "Andalouse" made its also impact in Poland since February 2015, peaking at the top 10 of Polish Airplay Top 100 and reaching the top of radio charts. The single's official music video premiered on Vevo on 25 September 2014. Later, it surpassed 100 million views and is the singer's most watched music video as of January 2021, with 347 million views.

== Charts ==
=== Weekly charts ===
Chart (2014–15)	Peak position
Belgium (Ultratip Bubbling Under Flanders)	14
Belgium (Ultratop 50 Wallonia)	3
France (SNEP)	3
Greece (Billboard)	3
Poland Airplay (ZPAV)	10
Poland (Polish Airplay New)	3
Switzerland (Schweizer Hitparade)	56

=== Year-end charts ===
Chart (2015)	Position
Belgium (Ultratop Wallonia)	12
Poland (ZPAV)	32

== Certifications ==
Region	Certification	Certified units/sales
Belgium (BRMA)	Gold	10,000^{‡}
France (SNEP)	Gold	75,000^{*}
^{*} Sales figures based on certification alone.^{‡} Sales+streaming figures based on certification alone.
