= La France (song) =

"La France" is a 2001 song by the French hip hop band Sniper. It addresses perceived injustices committed against minorities by the French political system and the opinion that even though there is a large number of people of African and Arab origins in France, they are poorly represented in politics. The song's chorus displays the message in a rather strong way:

La France est une garce et on s'est fait trahir
Le système, voilà ce qui nous pousse à les haïr
La haine, c'est ce qui rend nos propos vulgaires
On nique la France sous une tendance de musique populaire
On est d'accord et on se moque des répressions
On se fout de la République et de la liberté d'expression
Faudrait changer les lois et pouvoir voir
Bientôt à l'Elysée des arabes et des noirs au pouvoir

In English:

France is a bitch and we've been betrayed
The system is what makes us hate them
The hatred is what makes our words vulgar
We fuck France over with the pop music
We agree and we don't care about a repression
We don't give a damn about the Republic or the freedom of expression
The laws should be changed and we should see
Arabs and Blacks in power, soon at l'Elysée,

This song was among the ones that according to the French Minister of the Interior Nicolas Sarkozy had 'violent, racist and abusive' lyrics, particularly as it contains the line "Pour mission exterminer les ministres et les fachos" ("A mission to exterminate the ministers and fascists"), "Frère, je lance un appel, on est là pour tout niquer, leur laisser des traces et des séquelles, avant de crever" and "Mon seul souhait, désormais, est de nous voir les envahir" (Now, my only wish is to see us invading them).
