= La Bohème (Charles Aznavour song) =

1965 single by Charles Aznavour

- 1994 re-release cover

Single by Charles Aznavour

from the album Monsieur Carnaval
- Released: 1965
- Genre: Chanson
- Length: 3.59
- Label: Barclay
- Songwriter: Charles Aznavour

"La Bohème" is a song written by French lyricist Jacques Plante and Armenian-French musician Charles Aznavour. It is Aznavour's signature song, as well as one of the most popular French-language songs and a staple of French chanson.

== Lyrics ==
A painter, recalling his younger years in Montmartre, remembers his artistic life and the years when he was hungry but happy. According to Aznavour, this song is a farewell to the last days of bohemian Montmartre. He also recorded Italian, Spanish, English, and German versions, as well as a rare Portuguese recording. It was performed at virtually every one of his concerts.

== International charts ==
The song was first recorded by Aznavour in 1965. It became an international hit song in 1965 and was in TOP10 charts of Argentina (No. 3), Brazil (especially Rio de Janeiro (No. 5)), France (No. 1) and other countries.

== Cover versions ==
Kendji Girac's interpretation of the song, heavily influenced by Spanish and Romani culture, appeared on the 2014 tribute album Aznavour, sa jeunesse. It reached number 61 on the French SNEP singles chart.

Angelina Jordan recorded an English version of the song on her 2018 album It's Magic.

== See also ==
- La Bohème (album)
