= Addicted to Your Love =

Single by The Shady Brothers
- Released: 2014
- Genre: Pop
- Songwriter(s): Torsten Stenzel; Maximiliam Geraldo Schaede; Nicolas Schaede; Angela Stenzel

Music video
- "Addicted to Your Love" (acoustic) on YouTube

Music video
- "Addicted to Your Love" on YouTube

"Addicted to Your Love" is a 2014 single by The Shady Brothers, a duo made up of the twin brothers Geraldo and Nicolas Schaede from Saint Martin in the Caribbean becoming their first charting hit notably in France after touring the country in 2014.

The song had already become popular earlier and was included in the compilation NRJ Summer Hits Only 2014 released on Warner Music.

== Music videos ==
Two music videos were launched for the single. The first was a homemade acoustic version mostly in black and white. It was launched on 19 May 19, 2014 with official download site of the song on iTunes.

Later, a full colour music video was launched on 6 August 2014 to coincide with the launch of the single. It shows the two brothers in various activities together or with friends and highlights the natural sites and people of the island of Saint Martin.

== Charts ==
Chart (2014)	Peak position
France (SNEP)	63
