= Vivre... =

Studio album by Kendji Girac
- Released: 4 October 2024
- Length: 33:00
- Languages: French, Spanish
- Labels: K7G; Island Def Jam
- Producer: Renaud Rebillaud

Kendji Girac chronology
L'école de la vie (2022)	Vivre... (2024)

Singles from Vivre...
- 1. "Si seulement" Released: 30 August 2024; 2. "J'ai changé" Released: 15 January 2025

Vivre... (English: To live...) is the sixth studio album by French singer Kendji Girac. It was released on 4 October 2024 by Island Def Jam.

== Singles ==
"Si seulement..." was released as the lead single from the album on 30 August 2024. "J'ai changé" was released as the second single on 15 January 2025

== Track listing ==
Vivre... track listing
No.	Title	Length
1.	"Si seulement..."	2:57
2.	"Je te salue"	3:08
3.	"Soy Lo Que Soy"	2:30
4.	"Savoir Dire"	3:05
5.	"J'ai changé"	3:08
6.	"Camila"	2:34
7.	"Le choix"	2:49
8.	"Comme avant"	3:17
9.	"Pourquoi"	3:10
10.	"Papa"	3:42
11.	"Chiribi"	3:40

December 2024 reissue
No.	Title	Length
12.	"Amor De Mis Amores"	3:26
13.	"Si seulement... - Piano / voix"	2:57
14.	"Si seulement... - Guitare / voix"	2:56
15.	"Comme avant - Guitare / voix"	3:03
16.	"J'ai changé - Guitare / voix"	3:06
17.	"Pourquoi - Piano / voix"	3:08

== Charts ==
=== Weekly charts ===
Weekly chart performance for Vivre...
Chart (2024)	Peak position
Belgian Albums (Ultratop)	3
French Albums (SNEP)	3
Swiss Albums (Swiss Hitparade)	14

=== Year-end charts ===
2024 year-end chart performance for Vivre...
Chart (2024)	Position
Belgian Albums (Ultratop Wallonia)	141
French Albums (SNEP)	49

2025 year-end chart performance for Vivre...
Chart (2025)	Position
Belgian Albums (Ultratop Wallonia)	154

== Certifications ==
Region	Certification	Certified units/sales
France (SNEP)	Platinum	100,000^{‡}
^{‡} Sales+streaming figures based on certification alone.
