= Sonrisa (song) =

Single by Kendji Girac

from the album Ensemble (re-issue)
- Language: Spanish
- English title: Smile
- Released: 4 July 2016
- Recorded: 2016
- Length: 3:24
- Songwriter(s): Felipe Saldivia; Frédéric Salvio; Kendji Maillé
- Producer(s): Felipe Saldivia; Frédéric Salvio

Kendji Girac singles chronology
"Tu y yo" (2016)	"Sonrisa" (2016)	"Ma câlina" (2016)

Music video
- "Sonrisa" on YouTube

"Sonrisa" (English: "Smile") is a song by French singer Kendji Girac, it was released on July 4, 2016. The song peaked at number 25 in France and 42 in Belgium.

== Music video ==
The music video for "Sonrisa" was released on 4 July 2016 on YouTube, and includes white horses and black bulls on a beach with Girac. As of February 2021, the song has received 40 million views.

== Charts ==
Chart (2016)	Peak position
Belgium (Ultratop 50 Wallonia)	42
France (SNEP)	25
