= Soprano (rapper) =

French rapper (born 1979)

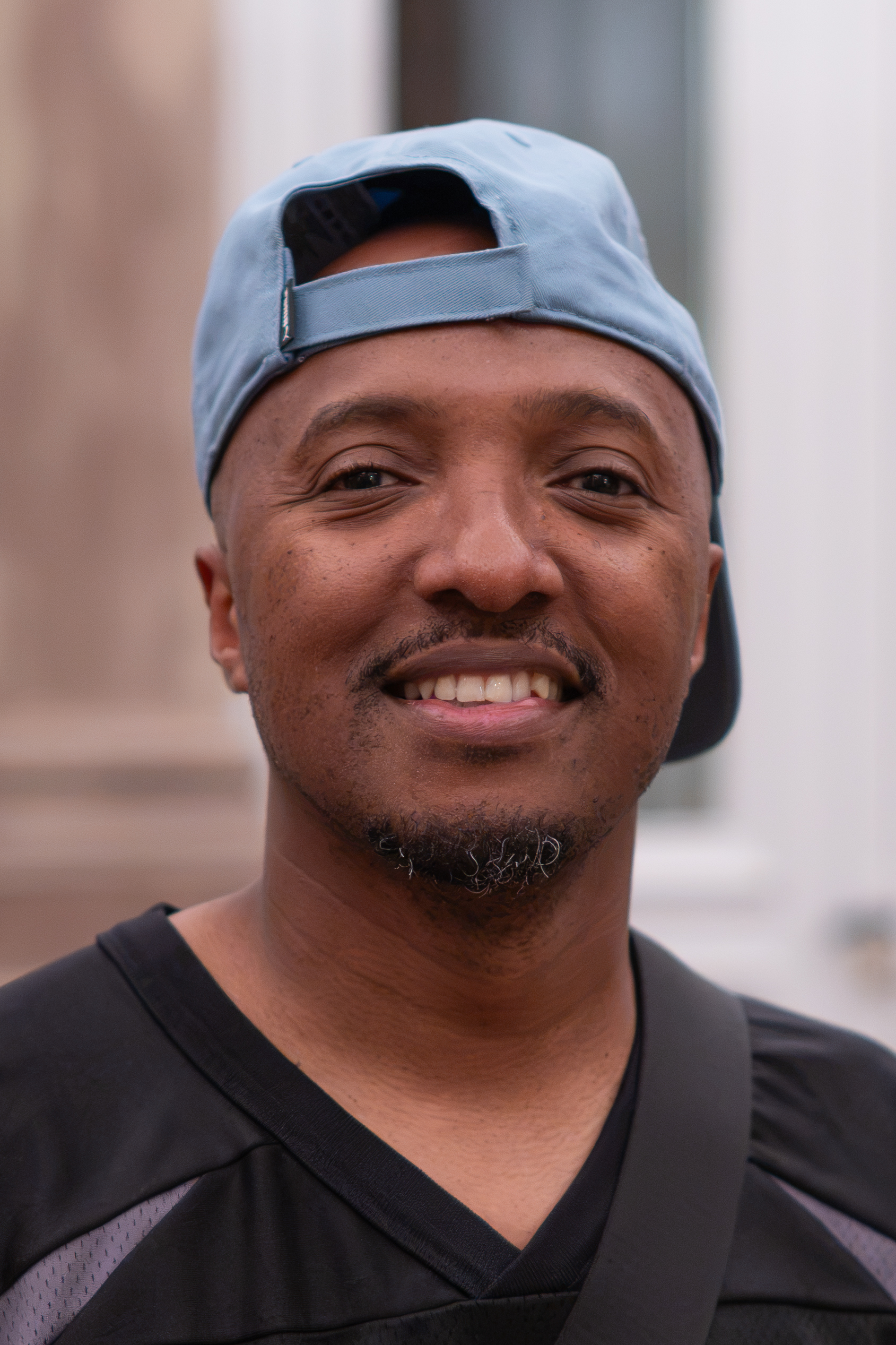
- Soprano in 2026

Background information
- Born: 14 January 1979 (age 47); Marseille, Provence-Alpes-Côte d'Azur, France
- Genres: Hip-hop, pop, chanson R&B, pop rap
- Occupations: Rapper, singer, songwriter, actor
- Years active: 1995–present
- Spouse: Alexia M'Roumbaba (m. 2006)
- Website: www.soprano-lesite.fr

Saïd M'Roumbaba (French pronunciation: [sa.id ɛmʁumbaba]; born 14 January 1979), better known by his stage name Soprano, is a French rapper, singer-songwriter, and television personality. Influential in the French hip hop scene, Soprano rose to notoriety in the late 1990s as a member of the rap band Psy 4 de la Rime. While in the group, Soprano recorded his solo debut album Puisqu'il Faut Vivre which made the Billboard European Top 100. Two years later, his second album, La Colombe, which included collaborations with numerous artists, was released. In addition to his music career, Soprano has served as a coach on The Voice – La plus belle voix (2019) and The Voice Kids (2018–2020, 2025–present).

== Early life ==
Soprano was born Saïd M'Roumbaba on 14 January 1979 in Marseille. His family was Comorian and practised Muslim faith. His father, Omar, was a handyman on oil tankers and his mother, Zahara, was a housekeeper. He made his debut in French rap in Psy 4 de la Rime, composed of Alonzo and Vincenzo (his cousins) and DJ Sya Styles (his childhood friend).

== Career ==
=== 2002–2009: De Street Skillz and Puisqu'il faut vivre ===
In 2003, while the Psy 4 de la Rime album, Block Party, was successful, Soprano opened Street Skillz Records with his DJ Mej, Matheo, and Cesare, a rapper and composer also from Marseille. Then, they release the compilations Block Life 1, 2, 3 and 4, on which many new rappers participated. The fourth volume of this compilation included the single "Dernière Chance" by Soprano and Léa Castel, which only achieved success in 2008 when Castel's album was released. The mixtape Psychanalyse avant l'albu was released in 2006, preceding the release of Puisqu'il faut vivre, his first solo album released in 2007. After its release, more than 200,000 copies were sold. The singles "Halla Halla", "À la bien" and "Ferme les yeux et imagine-toi" in duet with Blacko come from the album.

In 2008, Live au Dôme de Marseille was released. It was recorded during the tour following the release of his first album. At the "Year of Classical Music in 2008" ceremony, which rewards French hip-hop artists, Soprano was named "best artist of the year". Puisqu'il faut vivre wins the best album award, and "À la bien" won in the best song category.

=== 2010–2013: Further releases ===
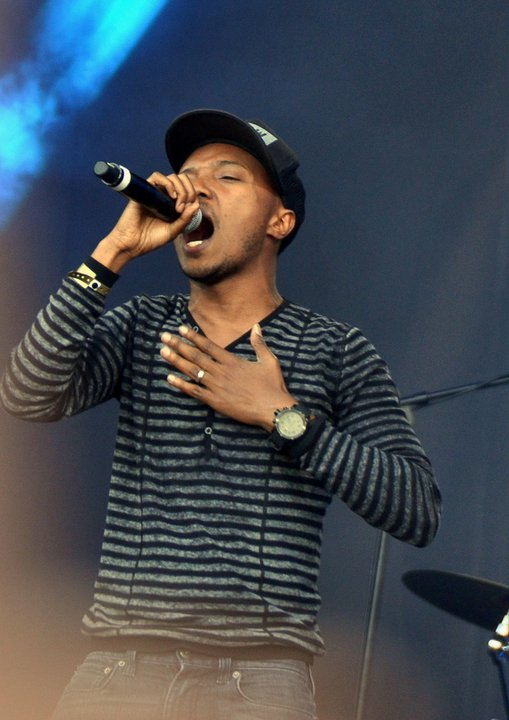
Soprano performing in July 2011

On 4 October 2010, Soprano released the album La Colombe through Hostile Records, which ranked first in album sales in France and became a gold record. Three notable singles were featured on the album: "Crazy", "Hiro", and Châteaux de sable.

In 2011, he released the album Le Corbeau, as well as the double album La Colombe et le corbeau which combines his last two albums. C'est ma life, Dopé, Regarde-moi, and Sale Sud Anthem are the singles from the album. Following this, Soprano achieved success with the single "Cherie Coco" with Magic System. He also sings in the song Tranne Te Megamix" with rappers Fabri Fibra, Redman, Marracash, Dargen D'Amico and Entics. He was nominated for the 2012 NRJ Music Awards in the French-speaking group/duo category with the single "C'est ma life" featuring DJ Abdel as well as in 2013 in the same category for the singer "Coup de coeur" featuring Kenza Farah.

=== 2014–2016: Cosmopolitanie ===
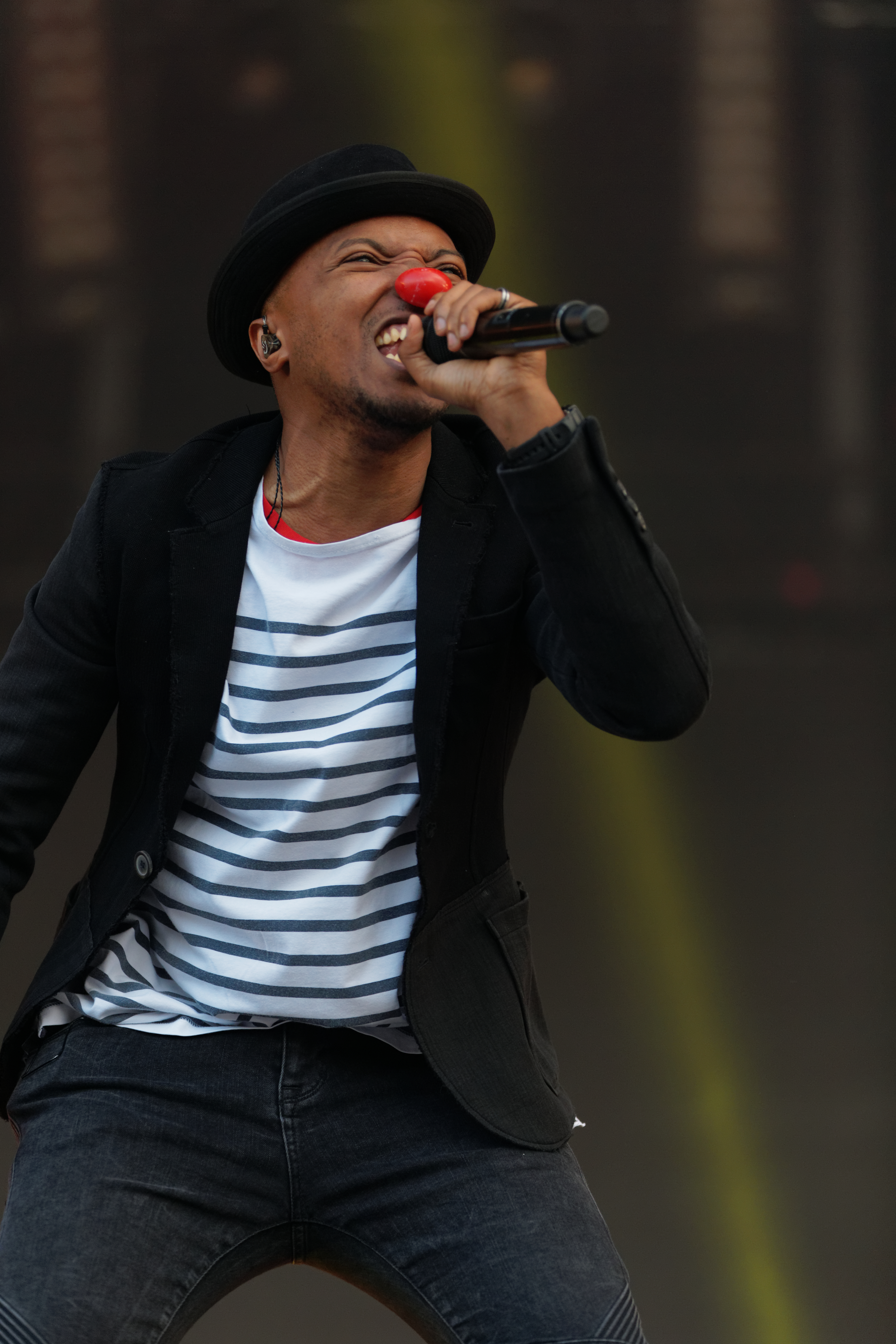
Soprano performing in 2015, wearing a red nose representing his single "Clown"

Soprano's fourth album, Cosmopolitanie, was released on 13 October 2014. Six singles are featured on the album: "Ils Nous Connaissent Pas", "Cosmo", "Fresh Prince", "Clown", "Millionaire", and "Barman". "Millionaire" and "Barman" are present on the reissue En route vers l'Everest. The album became a gold record one month after its release, then a platinum record a month later, two months after its release. The album is certified diamond record with more than 500,000 sales in December 2016.

=== 2016–2018: L'Everest ===
Soprano releases his fifth solo album, L'Everest, on 14 October 2016. The album became a gold record in just under a month. It became a platinum record in early December 2016, under two months after its release. In January 2017, the album was double platinum, then triple platinum in April 2017. The album became a diamond record in October 2017, a year after its release. In June 2018, the album had 800,000 copies sold.

=== 2018–2020: Phœnix, The Voice and The Voice Kids ===
On December 13, 2017, Soprano announced his new album, Phœnix, which was released on 9 November 2018. The first single from the album was released on 6 September 2018 and is entitled À la vie à l'amour. On October 26, 2018, he released the second single from his album entitled Zoum in duet with Niska. By December 2019, the album reached 500,000 sales.

From 2018 to 2020, Soprano served as a coach on the children's competition show, The Voice Kids. During his tenure he coached his two finalists, Lili Laville and Philippe Lebouthillier to third and fourth place, respectively. In 2019, he was a coach on The Voice – La plus belle voix where he coached his final artist, Clément Albertini, to second place.

=== 2020–present: Chasseur d'étoiles and Freedom ===
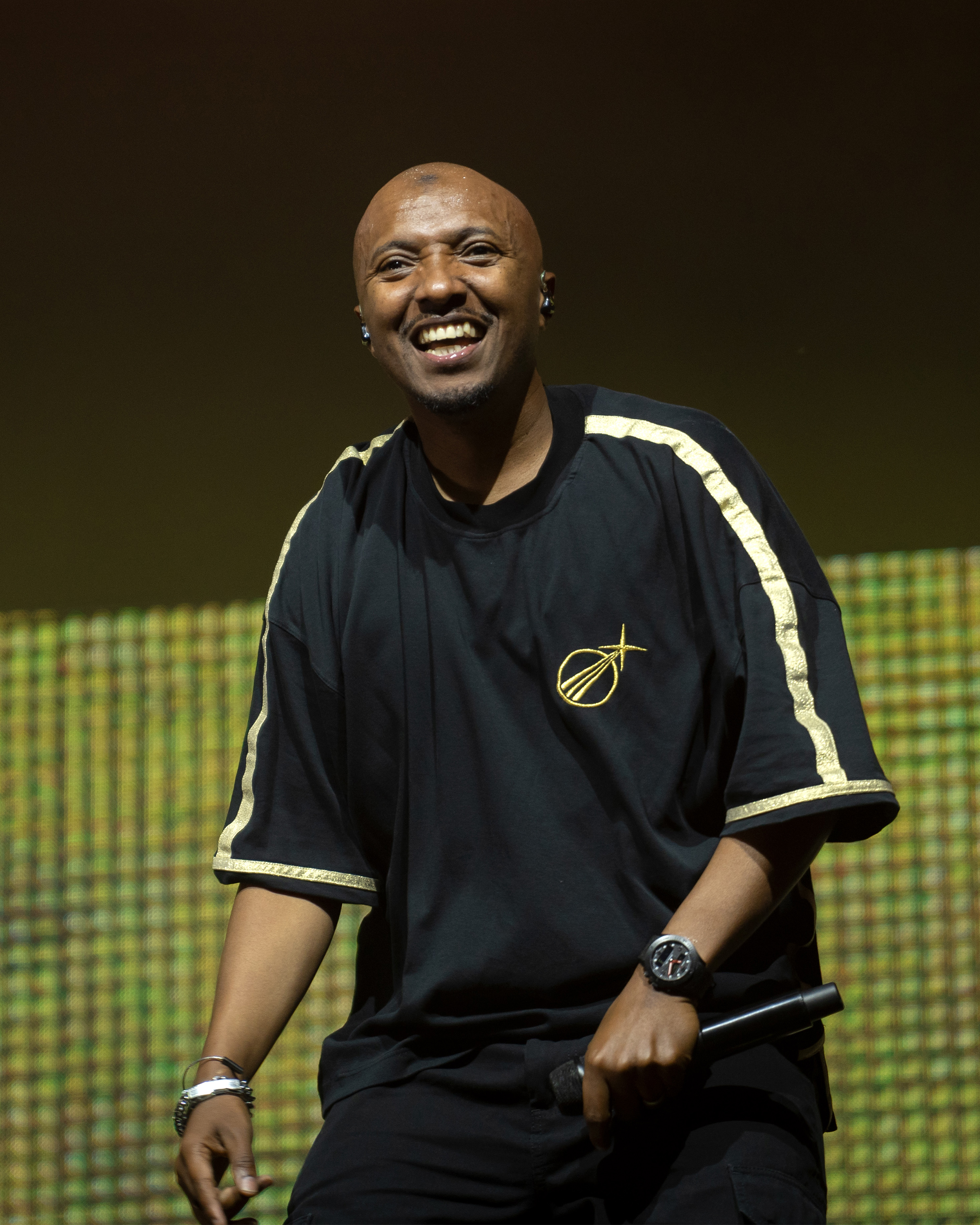
Soprano in May 2023

city, orchestrated by Jul. The album was certified platinum. In November 2020, he announced his next album, Chasseur d'étoiles as well as a tour of stadiums in France in a YouTube video. On 3 September 2021, the album was released.

On 4 June 2022, he began his tour at the Pontaise Stadium in Lausanne, with the tour ending on 6 May 2023. The latest title extracted from the Stadium Edition is called "Soldat de paix" (Peace Soldier) and discusses the COVID-19 pandemic and the war between Ukraine and Russia.

On 3 May 2024, he released the single "Facile à danser". On 23 May 2024, he announced his new album called Freedom.

On 31 March 2025, Soprano was announced to be returning to The Voice Kids as a coach for the eleventh season. The season premiered in August 2025.

== Artistry ==
Among his influences, Soprano mentions Michael Jackson, Daniel Balavoine, Kanye West, Jay-Z, Lil Wayne, Eminem and Mobb Deep. In a song, he quotes "the white MC of Detroit, Eminem, the MC of New York, Nas and that of LA, Dr. Dre" as influences. Soprano states that he aims to "break the clichés that people have of rap in general: vulgarity, negativity, violence, and ghettoization".

== Personal life ==
Soprano has been married to his wife, Alexia, since June 2006. Together, the couple has three children: Inaya, Lenny, and Luna. Soprano has another son, Kamil, that was born when he was only sixteen. In 2007, Soprano revealed that Kamil's mother, had "placed [him in welfare care] and warned [him] afterwards". Under French law, this prohibited Soprano from being recognised as Kamil's father.

== Discography ==
=== Studio albums ===
Title	Details	Peak chart positions			Units	Certifications
Title	Details	FRA	BEL (Wa)	SWI	Units	Certifications
Puisqu'il faut vivre	Released: 17 February 2007; Label: EMI, Hostile Records, Street Skillz; Format: Digital download, CD	2	14	26		SNEP: Gold
La Colombe	Released: 4 October 2010; Label: EMI, Hostile Records, Street Skillz; Format: Digital download, CD	1	5	18	FRA: 265,000+	
Le Corbeau	Released: 21 March 2011; Label: Hostile Records, Street Skillz; Format: Digital download, CD	3	10	44	FRA: 265,000+	
E=2MC's (with R.E.D.K.)	Released: 30 April 2012; Label: Parlophone; Format: Digital download, CD	6	5	27	FRA: ~29,000	
Cosmopolitanie	Released: 13 October 2014; Label: Parlophone, Warner Music, Street Skillz; Format: Digital download, CD	2	3	24	FRA: 500,000	SNEP: Diamond
L'Everest	Released: 14 October 2016; Label: Rec. 118, Warner Music; Format: Digital download, CD	2	2	14	FRA: 800,000+	SNEP: 2× Diamond
Phoenix	Released: 9 November 2018; Label: Rec. 118, Warner Music; Format: Digital download, CD, streaming	2	4	10	FRA: 585,191	FRA: Diamond
Phoenix	Re-released (Du Phoenix aux étoiles...): 8 November 2019; Label: Rec. 118, Warner Music; Format: Digital download, CD, streaming	—	—	61	FRA: 585,191	FRA: Diamond
Chasseur d'étoiles	Released: 3 September 2021; Label: Rec. 118, Warner Music; Format: Digital download, CD, streaming	1	2	11		SNEP: 3× Platinum
Freedom	Released: 21 June 2024; Label: Rec. 118, Warner Music; Format: Digital download, CD, streaming	—	4	74		
"—" denotes an album that did not chart or was not released.

=== Live albums ===
Title	Details	Peak chart positions	
Title	Details	FRA	BEL (Wa)
Live au Dôme de Marseille	Released: 20 March 2008; Label: Hostile Records, Parlophone; Format: Digital download, CD	39	42
Live 2012	Released: 17 February 2012; Label: Parlophone; Format: Digital download, CD	—	—
Un peu plus près du Stade de France	Released: 3 November 2023; Label: Rec. 118, Warner; Format: Digital download, CD	25	82
"—" denotes an album that did not chart or was not released.

=== Mixtapes ===
Title	Details	Peak chart positions	
Title	Details	FRA	BEL (Wa)
Psychanalyse avant l'album	Released: 3 October 2006; Label: Street Skillz; Format: Digital download	63	—
De Puisqu'il faut vivre à La Colombe	Released: 5 July 2010; Format: Digital download	14	18
"—" denotes an album that did not chart or was not released.

=== Other albums ===
Title	Details
La Colombe et Le Corbeau	Released: 16 March 2011; Label: Parlophone, Warner Music; Format: Digital download, CD

=== Singles ===
==== As lead artist ====
Year	Title	Peak chart positions				Album
Year	Title	FRA	BEL (Wa)	BEL (Fl)	SWI	Album
2006	"Moi j'ai pas"	28	—	—	—	Puisqu'il faut vivre
2007	"À la bien!"	24	17*	—	—	Puisqu'il faut vivre
2007	"Ferme les yeux et imagine toi" (featuring Blacko)	16	19*	—	—	Puisqu'il faut vivre
2007	"Halla Halla"	—	—	—	—	Puisqu'il faut vivre
2008	"Victory"	14	24*	—	—	Non-album single
2010	"Crazy"	—	11*	—	—	La Colombe
2011	"Hiro"	26	27	—	—	La Colombe
2011	"Regarde-moi"	16	4*	—	—	Le Corbeau
2012	"Accroche-toi à mes ailes"	—	39*	—	—	La Colombe
2012	"Avant de s'en aller" (with R.E.D.K.)	111	24*	—	—	E=2MC's
2013	"Quand la musique est bonne" (with Amel Bent)	40	—	—	—	Non-album singles
2013	"Sans toi"	131	5	—	—	Non-album singles
2014	"Regarde-nous"	118	8*	—	—	Non-album singles
2014	"Ils nous connaissent pas"	36	16*	—	—	Cosmopolitanie
2014	"Cosmo"	5	16	—	—	Cosmopolitanie
2014	"Fresh Prince" (feat. Uncle Phil)	9	7	90*	—	Cosmopolitanie
2014	"Clown"	11	8	—	—	Cosmopolitanie
2015	"Fais le moonwalk" (with DJ Abdel and Jul)	50	40*	—	—	Non-album single
2015	"Millionnaire"	12	16	—	—	Cosmopolitanie
2015	"Barman"	34	6	—	—	Cosmopolitanie
2016	"Le Diable ne s'habille plus en Prada"	10	33	—	—	L'Everest
2016	"En feu"	4	29	—	—	L'Everest
2016	"Mon Everest" (feat. Marina Kaye)	11	32	—	—	L'Everest
2016	"Roule"	23	—	—	99	L'Everest
2018	"Chez nous (Plan d'Aou, Air Bel)" (with Patrick Fiori)	55	—	—	—	
2018	"À la vie à l'amour"	61	12	—	—	Phœnix
2018	"Zoum" (featuring Niska)	42	41	—	—	Phœnix
2020	"Le cœur Holiday" (with Mika)	—	26	—	—	
2021	"Près des étoiles"	88	13	—	—	Chasseur d'étoiles
2021	"Dingue"	81	14	—	—	Chasseur d'étoiles
2021	"Si tu tombes" (with Patrick Fiori)	—	—	—	—	Non-album single
2022	"Forrest"	—	34	—	—	Chasseur d'étoiles
2022	"3615 bonheur"	—	42	—	—	Non-album single
2023	"Je suis fou" (with Vianney and Kendji Girac)	61	42	—	—	À 2 à 3
2026	"DJ"	—	18	—	—	Non-album single
"—" denotes a single that did not chart or was not released.

*Did not appear in the official Belgian Ultratop 50 charts, but rather in the bubbling under Ultratip charts.

==== As featured artist ====
Year	Title	Peak chart positions			Album
Year	Title	FRA	BEL (Wa)	SWI	Album
2008	"Dernière chance" (Léa Castel featuring Soprano)	—	36	66	Non-album singles
2008	"J'étais comme eux" (Demon One featuring Soprano)	16	—	—	Non-album singles
2011	"Chérie Coco" (Magic System featuring Soprano)	2	11	69	Non-album singles
2011	"C'est ma life" (DJ Abdel featuring Soprano)	26	11*	—	Non-album singles
2011	"J'te parle" (Sniper featuring Soprano)	55	—	—	Non-album singles
2012	"Coup de cœur" (Kenza Farah featuring Soprano)	16	21*	—	Non-album singles
2013	"Quand la musique est bonne" (Amel Bent and Soprano)	40	5*	—	Génération Goldman Vol. 2
2013	"De Marseille à Paris" (Maître Gims featuring Bedjik, Dr. Beriz, H Magnum & Soprano)	58	—	—	Subliminal La face cachée
2015	"Mama" (Zak & Diego featuring Soprano)	41	—	—	Non-album single
2015	"Mieux que nous" (M. Pokora featuring Soprano)	47	7*	—	R.E.D.
2015	"Pas de souci" (Zak & Diego featuring Soprano)	44	—	—	Non-album singles
2016	"No Me Mires Más" (Kendji Girac featuring Soprano)	7	24	71	Non-album singles
2016	"Frérot" (Black M featuring Soprano)	110	—	—	Éternel insatisfait
2017	"Ma famille" (Alonzo featuring Soprano)	92	—	—	100%
2018	"Les 4 fantastiques" (L'Algérino feat. Soprano, Naps & Alonzo)	101	—	—	International
2018	"TKT" (Jul feat. Soprano)	55	—	—	Inspi d'ailleurs
2018	"C'est que du rap" (Bigflo & Oli feat. Black M & Soprano)	66	—	—	La vie de rêve
2019	"Millions de mélos " (Bramsito feat. Soprano)	131	37*	—	Prémices_
2020	"La vida" (L'Algérino feat. Soprano)	110	—	—	
2020	"Bangobang" (Medi Meyz & Lartiste feat. Soprano & Ritchy Boy)	—	32*	—	
2021	"La vida" (L'Algérino feat. Soprano)	110	—	—	Moonlight
2021	"Combien" (Many, Jul, Solda, Moubarak, Soprano, Elams, Soso Maness, Veazy, Jhonson)	6	—	—	13 Organisé
2021	"Tout à changé" (Le Rat Luciano, Jul, L'Algérino, Sysa, Solda, Menzo, Stone Black, Fahar)	18	—	—	13 Organisé
2021	"La vie du binks" (Da Uzi, Ninho & SCH feat. Hornet La Frappe, Leto, Sadek & Soprano)	5	6*	—	Non-album single
"—" denotes a single that did not chart or was not released.

*Did not appear in the official Belgian Ultratop 50 charts, but rather in the bubbling under Ultratip charts.

=== Other charted songs ===
Year	Title	Peak chart positions		Album
Year	Title	FRA	BEL (Wa)	Album
2014	"Préface"	27		Cosmopolitanie
2014	"Mélancolie"	15		Cosmopolitanie
2014	"Ti amo"	18		Cosmopolitanie
2014	"Luna"	119		Cosmopolitanie
2014	"Le pain"	118	35*	Cosmopolitanie
2015	"Le pain"	133		Cosmopolitanie
2015	"J'ai encore rêvé de toi"	192		Cosmopolitanie
2016	"Marseille c'est..." (featuring Jul)	40		L'Everest
2016	"Rihanna" (featuring Alonzo)	86		L'Everest
2016	"Attitude" (featuring Black M)	169		L'Everest
2016	"Parle-moi"	193		L'Everest
2016	"Cœurdonnier"	90		L'Everest
2017	"Mon précieux"	109		L'Everest
2017	"Prélude du Phoenix"	73		L'Everest
2017	"Amour siamois"	75		L'Everest
2017	"Demain c'est maintenant"	76		L'Everest
2017	"Marc Landers"	85		L'Everest
2018	"La voisine"	167		Phoenix
2019	"Le coach" (featuring Vincenzo)	33	20	Phoenix
2019	"À nos héros du quotidien"	65	17	Phoenix
2019	"Fragile"	150	40	Phoenix
2019	"Musica" (feat. Ninho)	39		Du Phoenix aux étoiles...
2020	"Ninja"	37	32	TBA
