= List of number-one hits of 2014 (France) =

This is a list of the French SNEP Top 100 Singles and Top 200 Albums number-ones of 2014.

== Number ones by week ==
=== Singles chart ===
Week	Issue date	Artist(s)	Song	Ref.
1	5 January	Pharrell Williams	"Happy"	
2	12 January	Pharrell Williams	"Happy"	
3	19 January	Pharrell Williams	"Happy"	
4	26 January	Pharrell Williams	"Happy"	
5	2 February	Pharrell Williams	"Happy"	
6	9 February	Pharrell Williams	"Happy"	
7	16 February	Pharrell Williams	"Happy"	
8	23 February	Pharrell Williams	"Happy"	
9	2 March	Pharrell Williams	"Happy"	
10	9 March	Pharrell Williams	"Happy"	
11	16 March	Pharrell Williams	"Happy"	
12	23 March	Pharrell Williams	"Happy"	
13	30 March	Pharrell Williams	"Happy"	
14	6 April	Pharrell Williams	"Happy"	
15	13 April	Pharrell Williams	"Happy"	
16	20 April	Pharrell Williams	"Happy"	
17	27 April	Pharrell Williams	"Happy"	
18	4 May	Pharrell Williams	"Happy"	
19	11 May	Milky Chance	"Stolen Dance"	
20	18 May	Milky Chance	"Stolen Dance"	
21	25 May	Milky Chance	"Stolen Dance"	
22	1 June	Booba	"OKLM"	
23	8 June	Black M	"Sur Ma Route"	
24	15 June	Black M	"Sur Ma Route"	
25	22 June	Black M	"Sur Ma Route"	
26	29 June	Black M	"Sur Ma Route"	
27	6 July	Sia	"Chandelier"	
28	13 July	Lilly Wood and the Prick	"Prayer in C (Robin Schulz remix)"	
29	20 July	Lilly Wood and the Prick	"Prayer in C (Robin Schulz remix)"	
30	27 July	Lilly Wood and the Prick	"Prayer in C (Robin Schulz remix)"	
31	3 August	Lilly Wood and the Prick	"Prayer in C (Robin Schulz remix)"	
32	10 August	Lilly Wood and the Prick	"Prayer in C (Robin Schulz remix)"	
33	17 August	Lilly Wood and the Prick	"Prayer in C (Robin Schulz remix)"	
34	24 August	Lilly Wood and the Prick	"Prayer in C (Robin Schulz remix)"	
35	31 August	Lilly Wood and the Prick	"Prayer in C (Robin Schulz remix)"	
36	7 September	Lilly Wood and the Prick	"Prayer in C (Robin Schulz remix)"	
37	14 September	Lilly Wood and the Prick	"Prayer in C (Robin Schulz remix)"	
38	21 September	Lilly Wood and the Prick	"Prayer in C (Robin Schulz remix)"	
39	28 September	Lilly Wood and the Prick	"Prayer in C (Robin Schulz remix)"	
40	5 October	Lilly Wood and the Prick	"Prayer in C (Robin Schulz remix)"	
41	12 October	David Guetta featuring Sam Martin	"Dangerous"	
42	19 October	Lilly Wood and the Prick	"Prayer in C (Robin Schulz remix)"	
43	26 October	Lilly Wood and the Prick	"Prayer in C (Robin Schulz remix)"	
44	2 November	Sia	"Chandelier"	
45	9 November	Sia	"Chandelier"	
46	16 November	David Guetta featuring Sam Martin	"Dangerous"	
47	23 November	David Guetta featuring Sam Martin	"Dangerous"	
48	30 November	David Guetta featuring Sam Martin	"Dangerous"	
49	7 December	David Guetta featuring Sam Martin	"Dangerous"	
50	14 December	David Guetta featuring Sam Martin	"Dangerous"	
51	21 December	Mark Ronson featuring Bruno Mars	"Uptown Funk"	
52	28 December	Mark Ronson featuring Bruno Mars	"Uptown Funk"	

=== Albums chart ===
Week	Issue date	Artist(s)	Album	Ref.
1	5 January	Stromae	Racine carrée	
2	12 January	Stromae	Racine carrée	
3	19 January	Stromae	Racine carrée	
4	26 January	Stromae	Racine carrée	
5	2 February	Stromae	Racine carrée	
6	9 February	Stromae	Racine carrée	
7	16 February	Stromae	Racine carrée	
8	23 February	Stromae	Racine carrée	
9	2 March	Indila	Mini World	
10	9 March	Pharrell Williams	Girl	
11	16 March	Les Enfoirés	Bon anniversaire Les Enfoirés	
12	23 March	Les Enfoirés	Bon anniversaire Les Enfoirés	
13	30 March	Les Enfoirés	Bon anniversaire Les Enfoirés	
14	6 April	Les Enfoirés	Bon anniversaire Les Enfoirés	
15	13 April	Les Prêtres	Amen	
16	20 April	Les Prêtres	Amen	
17	27 April	Les Prêtres	Amen	
18	4 May	Indila	Mini World	
19	11 May	Indila	Mini World	
20	18 May	Michael Jackson	Xscape	
21	25 May	Coldplay	Ghost Stories	
22	1 June	Coldplay	Ghost Stories	
23	8 June	Yannick Noah	Combats ordinaires	
24	15 June	Various artists	La Bande à Renaud	
25	22 June	Various artists	La Bande à Renaud	
26	29 June	Various artists	La Bande à Renaud	
27	6 July	Various artists	La Bande à Renaud	
28	13 July	Stromae	Racine carrée	
29	20 July	Compilation album	NRJ Party Hits 2014	
30	27 July	Fréro Delavega	Fréro Delavega	
31	3 August	Keen'V	Saltimbanque	
32	10 August	Keen'V	Saltimbanque	
33	17 August	Various artists	NRJ Extravadance Summer 2014	
34	24 August	Calogero	Les Feux d'artifices	
35	31 August	Calogero	Les Feux d'artifices	
36	7 September	Lacrim	Corleone	
37	14 September	Kendji Girac	Kendji	
38	21 September	Kendji Girac	Kendji	
39	28 September	Kendji Girac	Kendji	
40	5 October	Kendji Girac	Kendji	
41	12 October	U2	Songs of Innocence	
42	19 October	U2	Songs of Innocence	
43	26 October	Kendji Girac	Kendji	
44	2 November	Various artists	Top 50 - 30 ans	
45	9 November	Julien Clerc	Partout la musique vient	
46	16 November	Pink Floyd	The Endless River	
47	23 November	Johnny Hallyday	Rester vivant	
48	30 November	Alain Souchon and Laurent Voulzy	Alain Souchon & Laurent Voulzy	
49	7 December	AC/DC	Rock or Bust	
50	14 December	AC/DC	Rock or Bust	
51	21 December	Kendji Girac	Kendji	
52	28 December	Kendji Girac	Kendji	

== See also ==
- 2014 in music
- List of number-one hits (France)
- List of top 10 singles in 2014 (France)
