= List of countries in the Eurovision Song Contest =

Participation since 1956 until 2027: Entered at least once Never entered, although eligible to do so Entry intended, but later withdrew Competed as a part of another country, but never as a sovereign country

Map of countries with EBU member broadcasters (as of June 2026)

Broadcasters from fifty-two countries have participated in the Eurovision Song Contest since its inaugural edition in 1956, with winning songs coming from twenty-eight of those countries. The contest, organised by the European Broadcasting Union (EBU), is held annually between members of the union who participate representing their countries. Broadcasters submit songs to the event where they are performed live by the performer(s) they had selected and cast votes to determine the winning song of the competition.

Participation in the contest is primarily open to all broadcasters with full EBU membership, with only one entrant per country allowed in any given year. To become a full member of the EBU, a broadcaster has to be from a country which is covered by the European Broadcasting Area—which is not limited only to the continent of Europe—or is a member state of the Council of Europe; a statutory revision in 2026 allows for broadcasters from observer states of the Council of Europe to also apply for full membership. Thus, eligibility is not determined by geographic inclusion within Europe, despite the "Euro" in "Eurovision", nor does it have a direct connection with the European Union. Several countries geographically outside the boundaries of Europe have been represented in the contest: Israel, Cyprus, and Armenia, in Western Asia, since 1973, 1981, and 2006 respectively; Morocco, in North Africa, only in 1980; and Australia since 2015; Canada, in North America, is set to make its debut in 2027. In addition, several transcontinental countries with only part of their territory in Europe have been represented: Turkey, from 1975 to 2012; Russia, from 1994 to 2021; Georgia, since 2007; and Azerbaijan, since 2008. Two countries that have previously sought to enter the competition, Lebanon and Tunisia, in Western Asia and North Africa respectively, are also outside of Europe. Australia, where the contest has been broadcast since 1983, has been represented every year since its debut in 2015, as its broadcaster is an EBU associate member and had received special approval from the contest's reference group.

The number of countries represented each year has grown steadily, from seven in 1956 to over twenty in the late 1980s. A record forty-three countries participated in 2008, 2011, and 2018. As the number of contestants has risen, preliminary competitions and relegation have been introduced, to ensure that as many countries as possible get the chance to compete. In 1993, a preliminary show, Kvalifikacija za Millstreet ("Qualification for Millstreet"), was held to select three Eastern European countries to compete for the first time in the main contest. After the 1993 contest, a relegation rule was introduced: the six lowest-placed countries in the contest would not compete in the following year. In 1996, a new system was introduced. Audiotapes of all twenty-nine entrants were submitted to national juries. The twenty-two highest-placed songs after the juries voted reached the contest. Norway, as the host country, directly qualified for the final. From 1997 to 2001, a system was used whereby the countries with the lowest average scores over the previous five years were relegated.

The relegation system used in 1994 and 1995 was used again between 1997 and 2003. Since 1999, the winning country in the previous year's contest automatically qualifies for the following year's final, along with the "Big" countries whose broadcasters are the largest financial contributors to the EBU. (Note: Namely France, Germany, Spain, and the United Kingdom (the initial "Big Four"); with Italy joining them when it returned to the contest in 2011.) In 2004, a semi-final was introduced. In addition to the "Big" countries, the countries that were in the top 10 the previous year received a bye and qualified directly for the final. A further ten countries qualified from the semi-final, making a total of 24 in the final. Since 2008, two semi-finals are held with all countries, except the previous year's winner and the "Big" countries, participating in one of the semi-finals.

Some countries, such as Germany, France, the United Kingdom, Belgium, and Switzerland, have entered most years, while Morocco has only entered once. Two countries, Tunisia and Lebanon, have attempted to enter the contest but withdrew before making a debut.

== Participants ==
=== Statistics by country ===
Each country's number of Eurovision wins as of 2026

The following table lists the countries with a broadcaster that have participated in the contest at least once, up to 2026. Planned entries for the cancelled 2020 contest and entries that failed to qualify in the qualification rounds in 1993 or 1996 are not counted.

Shading indicates countries whose broadcaster have withdrawn from the contest or former participants that are unable to compete in future contests. Yugoslavia and Serbia and Montenegro were both dissolved, in 1991 and 2006 respectively. Serbia and Montenegro was represented in the 1992 contest as the Federal Republic of Yugoslavia, which consisted of only those two republics. Montenegro and Serbia have each competed as separate countries since 2007. The Belarusian broadcaster BTRC was expelled from the EBU in July 2021, preventing them from competing in future editions of the contest, or any EBU event indefinitely. Following the Russian invasion of Ukraine and subsequent exclusion of Russia from the 2022 contest, the Russian broadcasters VGTRK and Channel One announced their intention to withdraw their EBU membership in February 2022 and were suspended from the union in May, preventing them from competing in future editions of the contest, or any EBU event for an indefinite period of time. The EBU member broadcasters from two additional countries have made failed attempts to participate in the contest, but in both cases withdrew their planned appearances at a late stage: Tunisia in 1977; and Lebanon in 2005. Liechtenstein attempted to join in 1976, but was ineligible due to the lack of an EBU member broadcaster.

Table key
†	Inactive – countries which participated in the past but did not appear in the most recent contest, or will not appear in the upcoming contest
◇	Ineligible – countries whose broadcasters are no longer part of the EBU and are therefore ineligible to participate
‡	Former – countries which previously participated but no longer exist

Statistics (As of 2026)
Country	Broadcaster(s)	Debut year	Latest entry	Entries	Finals	Qualifying (Note: Since 2004; not counting the pre-qualifiation rounds of 1993 and 1996. Only counting qualifications from semi-finals, not automatic qualifications.)		Latest final	Best placement		Wins
Country	Broadcaster(s)	Debut year	Latest entry	Entries	Finals	Amount	Rate	Latest final	Pos.	Latest (Note: Most recent year in which the country obtained this position.)	Wins
Albania	RTSH	2004	2027	22	13	12/21	57%	2026	5th	2012	0
Andorra †	RTVA	2004	2009	6	0	0/6	0%	N/A	12th (SF)	2007	0
Armenia	AMPTV	2006	2027	18	14	13/17	76%	2025	4th	2014	0
Australia	SBS	2015	2027	11	8	7/10	70%	2026	2nd	2016	0
Austria	ORF	1957	2027	58	51	8/15	53%	2026	1st	2025	3
Azerbaijan	İTV	2008	2027	18	13	12/17	71%	2022	1st	2011	1
Belarus ◇	BTRC	2004	2019 (Note: Not counting the cancelled 2020 edition in which Belarus was planned to participate and even sent an entry.)	16	6	6/16	38%	2019	6th	2007	0
Belgium (Note: Flemish broadcaster and Walloon broadcaster alternate participation in the contest representing Belgium, with both broadcasters sharing the broadcasting rights.)	RTBF (Note: Since 1978; previously represented by Institut national de radiodiffusion (INR; 1956–1960), (Note: Nationaal Instituut voor de Radio-omroep (NIR) and Institut national de radiodiffusion (INR) were the two official names of the single National Broadcasting Institute (NIR/INR).) and Radiodiffusion-télévision belge (RTB; 1961–1977).) / VRT (Note: Since 1998; previously represented by Nationaal Instituut voor de Radio-omroep (NIR; 1956–1960), Belgische Radio- en Televisieomroep (BRT; 1961–1990), and Belgische Radio- en Televisieomroep Nederlandstalige Uitzendingen (BRTN; 1991–1997).)	1956	2027	67	55	9/21	43%	2026	1st	1986	1
Bosnia and Herzegovina †	BHRT (Note: Between 2005 and 2016; previously represented by Radio Television of Bosnia and Herzegovina (RTVBiH; 1993–2000) and the Public Broadcasting Service of Bosnia and Herzegovina (PBSBiH; 2001–2004).)	1993	2016	19	18	7/8	88%	2012	3rd	2006	0
Bulgaria	BNT	2005	2027	15	6	6/15	40%	2026	1st	2026	1
Canada	CBC/Radio-Canada	2027	2027	To be determined							
Croatia	HRT	1993	2027	31	21	9/19	47%	2026	2nd	2024	0
Cyprus	CyBC	1981	2027	42	34	12/20	60%	2026	2nd	2018	0
Czechia (Note: Participated as Czech Republic until 2022.) †	ČT	2007	2026	14	6	6/14	43%	2026	6th	2018	0
Denmark	DR	1957	2027	54	46	12/20	60%	2026	1st	2013	3
Estonia	ERR (Note: Since 2008; previously represented by Eesti Televisioon (ETV) between 1993 and 2007.)	1994	2027	31	20	11/22	50%	2025	1st	2001	1
Finland	Yle	1961	2027	59	51	13/21	62%	2026	1st	2006	1
France	France Télévisions (Note: Since 2001; previously represented by Radiodiffusion-Télévision Française (RTF; 1956–1964), Office de Radiodiffusion Télévision Française (ORTF; 1965–1974), Télévision Française 1 (TF1; 1975–1981), Antenne 2 (1983–1992), and France Télévision (1993–2000).)	1956	2027	68	68	Permanent finalist (Note: Member of the "Big Five".)		2026	1st	1977	5
Georgia	GPB	2007	2027	18	8	8/18	44%	2024	9th	2011	0
Germany	ARD (SWR) (Note: Responsibility for organising ARD's entry rests with one of its member broadcasters, and has changed hands over the years. Südwestrundfunk (SWR) is currently representing Germany since 2026. See Germany in the Eurovision Song Contest § Organisation for full history of German participating broadcasters.)	1956	2027	69	69	Permanent finalist		2026	1st	2010	2
Greece	ERT (Note: Represented by the National Radio Television Foundation (EIRT) in 1974 and the New Hellenic Radio, Internet and Television (NERIT) in 2014 and 2015.)	1974	2027	46	43	16/19	84%	2026	1st	2005	1
Hungary †	MTVA (Note: Between 2011 and 2019; previous represented by Magyar Televízió between 1993 and 2010)	1994	2019	17	14	10/13	77%	2018	4th	1994	0
Iceland † (Note: Participating in a boycott.)	RÚV	1986	2025	37	28	11/20	55%	2025	2nd	2009	0
Ireland †	RTÉ (Note: Since 2010; previously represented by Radio Éireann (RÉ) in 1965 and 1966, and Radio Telefís Éireann (RTÉ) between 1967 and 2009.)	1965	2025	58	46	7/19	37%	2024	1st	1996	7
Israel	IPBC (Note: Since 2018; previously represented by the Israel Broadcasting Authority (IBA) between 1973 and 2017.)	1973	2027	48	41	13/20	65%	2026	1st	2018	4
Italy	RAI	1956	2027	51	51	Permanent finalist		2026	1st	2021	3
Latvia	LSM (Note: Since 2025; previously represented by Latvijas Televīzija (LTV) between 2000 and 2024.)	2000	2027	26	12	7/21	33%	2025	1st	2002	1
Lithuania	LRT	1994	2027	26	19	14/21	67%	2026	6th	2006	0
Luxembourg	RTL (Note: Since 2024; previously represented by the Compagnie Luxembourgeoise de Télédiffusion (CLT) between 1956 and 1993.)	1956	2027	40	39	2/3	67%	2025	1st	1983	5
Malta	PBS (Note: Since 1991; previously represented by the Maltese Broadcasting Authority (MBA) between 1971 and 1975.)	1971	2027	38	28	10/20	50%	2026	2nd	2005	0
Moldova	TRM	2005	2027	20	14	13/19	68%	2026	3rd	2017	0
Monaco †	TMC (Note: Between 1959 and 2006. TVMonaco (TVM) is the current EBU member in the country since 2024, thus eligible to participate in the contest.)	1959	2006	24	21	0/3	0%	1979	1st	1971	1
Montenegro	RTCG	2007	2027	14	2	2/14	14%	2015	13th	2015	0
Morocco †	RTM (Note: Represented by Radiodiffusion-Télévision Marocaine (RTM) in 1980. Société Nationale de Radiodiffusion et de Télévision (SNRT) is the current EBU member in the country, thus eligible to participate in the contest.)	1980		1	1	N/A		1980	18th	1980	0
Netherlands †	AVROTROS (Note: Since 2014; previously represented by Nederlandse Televisie Stichting (NTS; 1956–1969), Nederlandse Omroep Stichting (NOS; 1970–2009), and Televisie Radio Omroep Stichting (TROS; 2010–2013).)	1956	2025	65	54 (Note: The 2024 entry qualified for the final, but was removed from the competition following a backstage incident during the semi-final. The Netherlands retained the right to vote in the final.)	10/20	50%	2025	1st	2019	5
North Macedonia (Note: Participated as F.Y.R. Macedonia until 2019.)	MRT	1998	2027	21	9	6/18	33%	2019	7th	2019	0
Norway	NRK	1960	2027	64	61	16/19	84%	2026	1st	2009	3
Poland	TVP	1994	2027	28	18	9/19	47%	2026	2nd	1994	0
Portugal	RTP (Note: Since 2004; previously represented by Radiotelevisão Portuguesa (RTP; 1964–2003).)	1964	2027	57	47	9/19	47%	2025	1st	2017	1
Romania	TVR	1994	2027	24	20	12/16	75%	2026	3rd	2026	0
Russia ◇	RTR / C1R (Note: RTR and C1R alternated responsibilities for the contest.)	1994	2021	23	22	11/12	92%	2021	1st	2008	1
San Marino	SMRTV	2008	2027	16	4	4/16	25%	2025	19th	2019	0
Serbia	RTS	2007	2027	18	14	13/17	76%	2026	1st	2007	1
Serbia and Montenegro ‡	UJRT	2004	2005	2	2	1/1	100%	2005	2nd	2004	0
Slovakia †	RTVS (Note: In 2011 and 2012; previously represented by Slovenská televízia (STV) between 1994 and 2010. Slovenská televízia a rozhlas (STVR) is the current EBU member in the country since 2024, thus eligible to participate in the contest.)	1994	2012	7	3	0/4	0%	1998	18th	1996	0
Slovenia †	RTVSLO	1993	2025	30	17	8/21	38%	2024	7th	2001	0
Spain †	RTVE (Note: Since 2007; previously represented by Televisión Española (TVE) between 1961 and 2006.)	1961	2025	64	64	Permanent finalist		2025	1st	1969	2
Sweden	SVT (Note: Since 1980; previously represented by Sveriges Radio (SR) between 1958 and 1979.)	1958	2027	65	64	15/16	94%	2026	1st	2023	7
Switzerland	SRG SSR	1956	2027	66	54	9/21	43%	2025	1st	2024	3
Turkey †	TRT	1975	2012	34	33	6/7	86%	2012	1st	2003	1
Ukraine	Suspilne (Note: Since 2017; previously represented by the National Television Company of Ukraine (NTU) between 2003 and 2016.)	2003	2027	21	21	16/16	100%	2026	1st	2022	3
United Kingdom	BBC	1957	2027	68	68	Permanent finalist		2026	1st	1997	5
Yugoslavia (Note: The Federal Republic of Yugoslavia (Serbia and Montenegro) competed as "Yugoslavia" in 1992.) ‡	JRT	1961	1992	27	27	N/A		1992	1st	1989	1

=== Participating countries by year ===
Participants in the Eurovision Song Contest, coloured by decade of debut

Seven countries participated in the first contest. Since then, the number of entries has increased steadily. In 1961, three countries debuted, Finland, Spain, and Yugoslavia, joining the thirteen already included. Yugoslavia would become the only socialist country to participate in the following three decades. In 1970, a Nordic-led boycott of the contest reduced the number of countries entering to twelve. By the late 1980s, over twenty countries had become standard.

In 1993, the collapse of the USSR in Eastern Europe and the subsequent merger of EBU and the International Radio and Television Organisation (OIRT) gave numerous broadcasters from new countries the opportunity to compete. Three countries—Croatia, Slovenia, and Bosnia and Herzegovina, all of them former Yugoslav republics—went through a pre-qualifier round to compete. After the 1993 event, a relegation system was introduced, allowing more Eastern European countries to compete, with seven more making their debut in 1994.

In 2003, broadcasters from four countries applied to make their debut: Albania, Belarus, Bulgaria, and Ukraine. In addition, Serbia and Montenegro, who had not competed since 1992 when they competed as Yugoslavia, applied to debut. The EBU, having originally accepted the five countries' applications, later rejected all but Ukraine; allowing five further countries to compete would have meant relegating too many countries. The semi-final was introduced in 2004 in an attempt to prevent situations like this. The EBU set a limit of forty countries, but by 2005, thirty-nine were competing. In 2007, the EBU lifted the limit, allowing forty-two countries to compete. Two semi-finals were held for the first time in 2008. Only two countries have debuted from the 2009 contest onwards - Australia became the 52nd country to participate, debuting in 2015, and Canada the 53rd in 2027.

Line graph showing the number of countries participating in each Eurovision Song Contest. View source data.

==== Participating countries by decade ====
The following table lists the participating countries in each year since the first Eurovision Song Contest was held in 1956, sorted by each decade:

Table key
#	Debutant	The country made its debut during the decade.
1	Winner	The country won the contest.
2	Second place	The country was ranked second.
3	Third place	The country was ranked third.
X	Remaining places	The country placed from fourth to second last in the final.
◁	Last place	The country was ranked last in the final.
W/D	Withdrawn/disqualified before the contest	The country was to participate in the contest but either withdrew or got disqualified before the contest took place.
Ӿ	Disqualified during the contest	The country had already participated in at least one show but was disqualified before the completion of the contest (2024).
†	Non-qualified for the final	The country did not qualify for the final (2004–present).
‡	Non-qualified for the contest	The country did not qualify from the pre-qualifying round (1993, 1996).
?	Unknown	The country's placing in the contest is unknown (1956).
R	Relegated	The country was relegated from the contest due to poor results in the previous years (1994–1995; 1997–2003).
C	Cancelled	The contest was cancelled after the deadline for submitting songs had passed (2020).
U	Upcoming	The country is listed as a participant at the next contest, however, the contest has yet to take place.
	No entry	The country did not enter the contest.

===== 1956–1959 =====
Country	1956 (Note: Each country was represented by two songs in the 1956 contest; Switzerland's win in this contest was with one of their two songs.)	1957	1958	1959
Austria #		◁	X	X
Belgium #	?	X	X	X
Denmark #		3	X	X
France #	?	2	1	3
Germany #	?	X	X	X
Italy #	?	X	3	X
Luxembourg #	?	X	◁	
Monaco #				◁
Netherlands #	?	1	◁	1
Sweden #			X	X
Switzerland #	1	X	2	X
United Kingdom #		X		2

===== 1960–1969 =====
Country	1960	1961	1962	1963	1964	1965	1966	1967	1968	1969
Austria	X	◁	◁	X	X	X	1	X	X	
Belgium	X	◁	◁	X	X	◁	X	X	X	X
Denmark	X	X	X	1	X	X	X			
Finland #		X	X	◁	X	◁	X	X	◁	X
France	1	X	1	X	X	3	X	3	3	1
Germany	X	X	X	X	◁	◁	X	X	X	X
Ireland #						X	X	2	X	X
Italy	X	X	X	3	1	X	◁	X	X	X
Luxembourg	◁	1	3	X	X	1	X	X	X	X
Monaco	3	X	2	X	3	X	◁	X	X	X
Netherlands	X	X	◁	◁	X	X	X	X	◁	1
Norway #	X	X	X	◁	X	X	3	X	X	◁
Portugal #					◁	X	X	X	X	X
Spain #		X	◁	X	X	◁	X	X	1	1
Sweden	X	X	X	◁		X	2	X	X	X
Switzerland	X	3	X	2	◁	X	X	◁	X	X
United Kingdom	2	2	X	X	2	2	X	1	2	1
Yugoslavia #		X	X	X	◁	X	X	X	X	X

===== 1970–1979 =====
Country	1970	1971	1972	1973	1974	1975	1976	1977	1978	1979
Austria		X	X				X	X	X	◁
Belgium	X	X	X	◁	X	X	X	X	2	◁
Denmark									X	X
Finland		X	X	X	X	X	X	X	X	X
France	X	X	X	X	W	X	2	1	3	3
Germany	3	3	3	X	◁	X	X	X	X	X
Greece #					X		X	X	X	X
Ireland	1	X	X	X	X	X	X	3	X	X
Israel #				X	X	X	X	X	1	1
Italy	X	X	X	X	2	3	X	X	X	X
Luxembourg	◁	X	1	1	X	X	X	X	X	X
Malta #		◁	◁	W		X				
Monaco	X	1	X	X	X	X	3	X	X	X
Netherlands	X	X	X	X	3	1	X	X	X	X
Norway		X	X	X	◁	X	◁	X	◁	X
Portugal		X	X	X	◁	X	X	X	X	X
Spain	X	2	X	2	X	X	X	X	X	2
Sweden		X	X	X	1	X		◁	X	X
Switzerland	X	X	X	X	◁	X	X	X	X	X
Tunisia								W		
Turkey #						◁			X	W
United Kingdom	2	X	2	3	X	2	1	2	X	X
Yugoslavia	X	X	X	X	X	X	X			

===== 1980–1989 =====
Country	1980	1981	1982	1983	1984	1985	1986	1987	1988	1989
Austria	X	X	X	X	◁	X	X	X	◁	X
Belgium	X	X	X	X	X	◁	1	X	X	X
Cyprus #		X	X	X	X	X	◁	X	W	X
Denmark	X	X	X	X	X	X	X	X	3	3
Finland	◁	X	◁	X	X	X	X	X	X	X
France	X	3		X	X	X	X	X	X	X
Germany	2	2	1	X	X	2	X	2	X	X
Greece	X	X	W	X		X	W	X	X	X
Iceland #							X	X	X	◁
Ireland	1	X	X		2	X	X	1	X	X
Israel		X	2	2		X	X	X	X	X
Italy	X			X	X	X		3	X	X
Luxembourg	X	X	X	1	X	X	3	X	X	X
Morocco #	X									
Netherlands	X	X	X	X	X		X	X	X	X
Norway	X	◁	X	X	X	1	X	X	X	X
Portugal	X	X	X	X	X	X	X	X	X	X
Spain	X	X	X	◁	3	X	X	X	X	X
Sweden	X	X	X	3	1	3	X	X	X	X
Switzerland	X	X	3	X	X	X	2	X	1	X
Turkey	X	X	X	◁	X	X	X	◁	X	X
United Kingdom	3	1	X	X	X	X	X	X	2	2
Yugoslavia		X	X	X	X		X	X	X	1

===== 1990–1999 =====
Country	1990	1991	1992	1993	1994	1995	1996	1997	1998	1999
Austria	X	◁	X	X	X	X	X	X	R	X
Belgium	X	X	X	◁	R	X	X	R	X	X
Bosnia and Herzegovina #				X	X	X	X	X	R	X
Croatia #				X	X	X	X	X	X	X
Cyprus	X	X	X	X	X	X	X	X	X	X
Denmark	X	X	X	X	R	X	‡	X	R	X
Estonia #				‡	X	R	X	X	X	X
Finland	◁	X	◁	X	X	R	◁	R	X	R
France	2	2	X	X	X	X	X	X	X	X
Germany	X	X	X	X	3	◁	‡	X	X	3
Greece	X	X	X	X	X	X	X	X	X	R
Hungary #				‡	X	X	‡	X	X	
Iceland	X	X	X	X	X	X	X	X	R	2
Ireland	2	X	1	1	1	X	1	2	X	X
Israel	X	3	X	X	R	X	‡		1	X
Italy	1	X	X	X				X		
Latvia										W
Lithuania #					◁	R		R		X
Luxembourg	X	X	X	X	R			R		
Macedonia #							‡	R	X	R
Malta		X	3	X	X	X	X	X	3	X
Netherlands	X		X	X	X	R	X	X	X	X
Norway	◁	X	X	X	X	1	2	◁	X	X
Poland #					2	X	X	X	X	X
Portugal	X	X	X	X	X	X	X	◁	X	X
Romania #				‡	X	R	‡	R	X	R
Russia #					X	X	‡	X	R	
Slovakia #				‡	X	R	X	R	X	R
Slovenia #				X	R	X	X	X	X	X
Spain	X	X	X	X	X	2	X	X	X	◁
Sweden	X	1	X	X	X	3	3	X	X	1
Switzerland	X	X	X	3	X	R	X	X	◁	R
Turkey	X	X	X	X	R	X	X	3	X	X
United Kingdom	X	X	2	2	X	X	X	1	2	X
Yugoslavia	X	X	X							

===== 2000–2009 =====
Country	2000	2001	2002	2003	2004	2005	2006	2007	2008	2009
Albania #					X	X	†	†	X	X
Andorra #					†	†	†	†	†	†
Armenia #							X	X	X	X
Austria	X	R	X	X	X	†		†		
Azerbaijan #									X	3
Belarus #					†	†	†	X	†	†
Belgium	◁	R	X	2	X	†	†	†	†	†
Bosnia and Herzegovina	R	X	X	X	X	X	3	X	X	X
Bulgaria #						†	†	X	†	†
Croatia	X	X	X	X	X	X	X	†	X	X
Cyprus	X	R	X	X	X	X	†	†	†	†
Czech Republic #								†	†	†
Denmark	1	2	◁	R	†	X	X	†	X	X
Estonia	X	1	3	X	†	†	†	†	†	X
Finland	X	R	X	R	†	†	1	X	X	◁
France	X	X	X	X	X	X	X	X	X	X
Georgia #								X	X	W
Germany	X	X	X	X	X	◁	X	X	X	X
Greece		3	X	X	3	1	X	X	3	X
Hungary						X		X	†	†
Iceland	X	◁	R	X	X	†	†	†	X	2
Ireland	X	X	R	X	X	†	X	◁	†	†
Israel	X	X	X	X	†	X	X	†	X	X
Latvia #	3	X	1	X	†	X	X	X	X	†
Lebanon						W				
Lithuania	R	X	X	R	†	†	X	X	†	X
Macedonia	X	R	X	R	X	X	X	X	†	†
Malta	X	X	2	X	X	2	◁	†	†	X
Moldova #						X	X	X	†	X
Monaco					†	†	†			
Montenegro #								†	†	†
Netherlands	X	X	R	X	X	†	†	†	†	†
Norway	X	◁	R	X	◁	X	X	†	X	1
Poland	R	X	R	X	X	†	†	†	X	†
Portugal	R	X		X	†	†	†	†	X	X
Romania	X	R	X	X	X	3	X	X	X	X
Russia	2	X	X	3	X	X	2	3	1	X
San Marino #									†	
Serbia #								1	X	†
Serbia and Montenegro #					2	X	W (Note: Serbia and Montenegro kept their voting rights after they withdrew.)			
Slovakia										†
Slovenia	R	X	X	X	†	†	†	X	†	†
Spain	X	X	X	X	X	X	X	X	X	X
Sweden	X	X	X	X	X	X	X	X	X	X
Switzerland	X	R	X	R	†	X	X	†	†	†
Turkey	X	X	X	1	X	X	X	X	X	X
Ukraine #				X	1	X	X	2	2	X
United Kingdom	X	X	3	◁	X	X	X	X	◁	X

===== 2010–2019 =====
Country	2010	2011	2012	2013	2014	2015	2016	2017	2018	2019
Albania	X	†	X	†	†	X	†	†	X	X
Armenia	X	†	W	X	X	X	X	X	†	†
Australia #						X	2	X	X	X
Austria		X	†	†	1	X	X	X	3	†
Azerbaijan	X	1	X	2	X	X	X	X	†	X
Belarus	X	†	†	X	X	†	†	X	†	X
Belgium	X	†	†	X	†	X	X	X	†	†
Bosnia and Herzegovina	X	X	X				†			
Bulgaria	†	†	†	†			X	2	X	
Croatia	†	†	†	†			X	X	†	†
Cyprus	X	†	X	†		X	X	X	2	X
Czech Republic						†	X	†	X	X
Denmark	X	X	X	1	X	†	†	X	X	X
Estonia	†	X	X	X	†	X	†	†	X	X
Finland	†	X	†	X	X	†	†	†	X	†
France	X	X	X	X	◁	X	X	X	X	X
Georgia	X	X	†	X	†	X	X	†	†	†
Germany	1	X	X	X	X	◁	◁	X	X	X
Greece	X	X	X	X	X	X	†	X	†	X
Hungary		X	X	X	X	X	X	X	X	†
Iceland	X	X	X	X	X	†	†	†	†	X
Ireland	X	X	X	◁	†	†	†	†	X	†
Israel	X	†	†	†	†	X	X	X	1	X
Italy		2	X	X	X	3	X	X	X	2
Latvia	†	†	†	†	†	X	X	†	†	†
Lithuania	†	X	X	X	†	X	X	†	X	†
Malta	†	†	X	X	X	†	X	†	†	X
Moldova	X	X	X	X	†	†	†	3	X	†
Montenegro			†	†	X	X	†	†	†	†
Netherlands	†	†	†	X	2	†	X	X	X	1
North Macedonia	†	†	X	†	†	†	†	†	†	X
Norway	X	†	◁	X	X	X	†	X	X	X
Poland	†	†			X	X	X	X	†	†
Portugal	X	†	†		†	†		1	◁	†
Romania	3	X	X	X	X	X	D	X	†	†
Russia	X	X	2	X	X	2	3	W	†	3
San Marino		†	†	†	X	†	†	†	†	X
Serbia	X	X	3	†		X	X	†	X	X
Slovakia	†	†	†							
Slovenia	†	X	†	†	X	X	†	†	X	X
Spain	X	X	X	X	X	X	X	◁	X	X
Sweden	†	3	1	X	3	1	X	X	X	X
Switzerland	†	◁	†	†	X	†	†	†	†	X
Turkey	2	†	X							
Ukraine	X	X	X	3	X		1	X	X	W
United Kingdom	◁	X	X	X	X	X	X	X	X	◁

===== 2020–2027 =====
Country	~~2020~~ (Note: The 2020 contest was cancelled due to the COVID-19 pandemic.)	2021	2022	2023	2024	2025	2026	2027
Albania	C	X	†	X	†	X	X	U
Armenia	C	W	X	X	X	X	†	U
Australia	C	†	X	X	†	†	X	U
Austria	C	†	†	X	X	1	X	U
Azerbaijan	C	X	X	†	†	†	†	U
Belarus	C	D						
Belgium	C	X	X	X	†	†	X	U
Bulgaria	C	X	†				1	U
Canada #								U
Croatia	C	†	†	X	2	†	X	U
Cyprus	C	X	†	X	X	†	X	U
Czechia	C	†	X	X	†	†	X	
Denmark	C	†	†	†	†	X	X	U
Estonia	C	†	X	X	X	3	†	U
Finland	C	X	X	2	X	X	X	U
France	C	2	X	X	X	X	X	U
Georgia	C	†	†	†	X	†	†	U
Germany	C	X	◁	◁	X	X	X	U
Greece	C	X	X	†	X	X	X	U
Iceland	C	X	X	†	†	X		
Ireland	C	†	†	†	X	†		
Israel	C	X	†	3	X	2	2	U
Italy	C	1	X	X	X	X	X	U
Latvia	C	†	†	†	X	X	†	U
Lithuania	C	X	X	X	X	X	X	U
Luxembourg					X	X	†	U
Malta	C	X	†	†	†	X	X	U
Moldova	C	X	X	X	†	W	X	U
Montenegro			†			†	†	U
Netherlands	C	X	X	†	Ӿ (Note: The Netherlands kept their voting rights in the final after they were disqualified.)	X		W
North Macedonia	C	†	†					U
Norway	C	X	X	X	◁	X	X	U
Poland	C	†	X	X	†	X	X	U
Portugal	C	X	X	X	X	X	†	U
Romania	C	†	X	†			3	U
Russia	C	X	D					
San Marino	C	X	†	†	†	◁	†	U
Serbia	C	X	X	X	X	†	X	U
Slovenia	C	†	†	X	X	†		
Spain	C	X	3	X	X	X		
Sweden	C	X	X	1	X	X	X	U
Switzerland	C	3	X	X	1	X	†	U
Ukraine	C	X	1	X	3	X	X	U
United Kingdom	C	◁	2	X	X	X	◁	U

== Other potential participants ==
For any broadcaster wishing to take part in the Eurovision Song Contest, it must be an active member of the EBU. Associate members can be invited by the EBU in order to take part since 2015, with only one associate broadcaster, Australia's SBS, being invited into the competition to date.

Among the countries which have been discussed as potential new entrants are China, the Faroe Islands, Kazakhstan, Kosovo, New Zealand, and Qatar, some of which are ineligible to participate due to a lack of an active or associate member broadcaster of the EBU.

=== EBU members ===
As of the 2026 contest, the following countries have never taken part in the contest, despite having broadcasters eligible to compete due to being current members of the EBU:

- Algeria – ENRS, EPTV, TDA
- Egypt – NTU
- Jordan – JRTV
- Lebanon – TL
- Tunisia – RT, TT (RTT)
- Vatican City – VR

Libyan broadcaster LNC, is currently ineligible to take part as its membership is currently suspended by the EBU.

The following country has never taken part in the contest, despite having a broadcaster which was a member of the EBU:

- Czechoslovakia – ČST (EBU member 1991–1992) (Note: Succeeded by Česká televize (ČT) of Czechia and Slovenská televízia (STV) of Slovakia, both of which entered the contest.)

==== Past attempts ====
In 1977, Tunisia's broadcaster ERTT was set to take part and perform in position 4 in the final, but later withdrew with no reason given. In 2005, Lebanese broadcaster TL was set to take part in the semi-final with the song "Quand tout s'enfuit" by Aline Lahoud. The broadcaster withdrew in March 2005 due to Lebanese law restricting Israeli content being aired on television, with Israel also set to take part in the semi-final. Following a three-year ban from the contest incurred by the late withdrawal, TL has not made another attempt since.

== See also ==
- List of countries in the Eurovision Young Dancers
- List of countries in the Eurovision Young Musicians
- List of countries in the Junior Eurovision Song Contest

== Works cited ==
- O'Connor, John Kennedy (2005). The Eurovision Song Contest: 50 Years – The Official History. London, United Kingdom: Carlton Books. ISBN 9781844425860.
- O'Connor, John Kennedy (2007). The Eurovision Song Contest: The Official History. London, United Kingdom: Carlton Books. ISBN 9781844429943.
