= Marimoutou =

Marimoutou is a surname. Notable people with the surname include:

- Gwendal Marimoutou (born 1995), French actor
- Vêlayoudom Marimoutou (born 1957), French economist

== See also ==
- Marimo
