= The Voice: la plus belle voix season 3 =

The Voice: la plus belle voix
- Season 3
- Hosted by: Nikos Aliagas; Karine Ferri
- Judges: Florent Pagny, Jenifer, Mika, Garou
- Winner: Kendji Girac

Release
- Original network: TF1
- Original release: January 11 – May 10, 2014

Season chronology
- ← Previous; Season 2 Next → Season 4

The Voice: la plus belle voix (season 3) is the third season of the French reality singing competition, created by media tycoon John de Mol. It was aired from 11 January 2014 to 10 May 2014 on TF1.

A key aspect of the show is the high-quality singing talent. Four renowned coaches, who are also popular artists, mentor contestants and sometimes perform with them. Contestants are chosen through blind auditions, where coaches hear but not see the auditioners.

Three of the coaches continued from season 2, namely were Florent Pagny, Jenifer and Garou. But the fourth coach Louis Bertignac from seasons 1 and 2 was replaced by British singer Mika. Kendji Girac of Team Mika was the third season winner with finale held on May 10, 2014.

== Overview ==
– Winning Coach/Contestant. Winner and finalists are in bold, eliminated contestants in small font.
– Runner-Up Coach/Contestant. Final contestant first listed.
– 2nd Runner-Up Coach/Contestant. Final contestant first listed.

List of contestants by coach
Garou	Mika	Jenifer	Florent Pagny
Maximilien Philippe; Igit; Alex; Gwendal Marimoutou; Charlie; Mélissa Maugran; Flo; Natacha Andreani; Tifayne; Noémie Garcia; Cloé; Roman; Mamido; Kissamilé	**Kendji Girac**; Pierre Edel; Marina D'Amico; Spleen; Caroline Savoie; Élodie Martelet; Quentin; Fabienne Della-Moniqua; Fréro Delavega; Akram Sedkaoui; Mélissa Bon; Najwa; Youness; Claudia Costa	Amir Haddad; Leïla Huissoud; Manon Trinquier; Emma Shaka; Sarah Jad; Elliott; Florence Coste; Rich Ly; La Petite Shade; Lioan; Margie; Ginie Line; François Lachance; Jacynthe Véronneau; Ayelya	Wesley; Julie Erikssen; Santo Barracato; Juliette Moraine; Jérémy Bertini; Stacey King; Aline Lahoud; Bruno Moreno; Alexia Rabé; Adrien Abelli; Carine Robert; Jérémy Ichou; Edu del Prado; Teiva; Sophie Delmas

== Results ==
=== Stage 1 : « Auditions à l'aveugle » (Blind Auditions) ===
The Blind Auditions were broadcast on 11, 18, 25 January and 1, 8 and 15 February 2014.

Key	Coach hit his or her "JE VOUS VEUX" button	Contestant eliminated with no coach pressing his or her "JE VOUS VEUX" button	Contestant defaulted to this coach's team	Contestant elected to join this coach's team

==== Episode 1: January 11, 2014 ====
Order	Contestant	Song	Coaches' and Contestants' Choices			
Order	Contestant	Song	Florent Pagny	Jenifer	Mika	Garou
1	Pierre Edel	House of the rising sun – The Animals		—		
2	Leïla Huissoud	Caravane – Raphael				
3	Linda Lee Hopkins	Can't Take My Eyes Off You – Frankie Valli	—	—	—	—
4	Igit	Fever – Peggy Lee				
5	Manon	Formidable – Stromae			—	
6	Emma Shaka	Purple Rain – Prince			—	—
7	Marina D'Amico	Papaoutai – Stromae				
8	Alex	You Make Me Feel (Mighty Real) – Sylvester	—			
9	Alejandro Reyes	Wake Me Up! – Avicii	—	—	—	—
10	Spleen	Toxic – Britney Spears				—
11	Julie Erikssen	Underwater – Mika			—	—

==== Episode 2: January 18, 2014 ====
Order	Contestant	Song	Coaches' and Contestants' Choices			
Order	Contestant	Song	Florent Pagny	Jenifer	Mika	Garou
1	Sarah Jad	Étienne - Guesch Patti			—	
2	Maximilien Philippe	When I Was Your Man – Bruno Mars			—	
3	Antho	Love Me Again – John Newman	—	—	—	—
4	Kendji Girac	Bella – Maître Gims	—	—		—
5	Caroline Savoie	Ain't No Sunshine – Bill Withers				
6	Santo Barracato	'O sole mio – Giovanni Capurro & Eduardo di Capua		—	—	—
7	Amir Haddad	Candle in the Wind – Elton John				
8	Elliott	Nightcall – Kavinsky	—		—	—
9	Juliette Moraine	Jalouse – Mademoiselle K		—	—	—
10	Gwendal Marimoutou	I Am What I Am – Gloria Gaynor	—			
11	Ayrton Paris	Les Lacs du Connemara – Michel Sardou	—	—	—	—
12	Jérémy Bertini	Ave Maria – Charles Gounod			—	

==== Episode 3: January 25, 2014 ====
Order	Contestant	Song	Coaches' and Contestants' Choices			
Order	Contestant	Song	Florent Pagny	Jenifer	Mika	Garou
1	Élodie Martelet	Still Loving You – Scorpions				
2	Fabien Incardona	Wuthering Heights – Kate Bush	—	—	—	—
3	Stacey King	Skyfall – Adele		—		
4	Florence Coste	Hymne à l'amour – Édith Piaf	—		—	—
5	Quentin	Wonderful Life – Black	—			
6	Doushka Esposito	Ave Maria de Caccini – Vladimir Vavilov	—	—	—	—
7	Fabienne Della-Moniqua	The Great Gig in the Sky – Pink Floyd				—
8	Charlie	Que je t'aime – Johnny Hallyday	—	—	—	
9	Mélissa Maugran	Love on Top – Beyoncé		—	—	
10	Rich Ly	Ne me quitte pas – Jacques Brel	—		—	—
11	Aline Lahoud	Khedni Maak – Salwa Al Katrib				
12	La Petite Shade	Royals – Lorde	—		—	—

==== Episode 4: February 1, 2014 ====
Order	Contestant	Song	Coaches' and Contestants' Choices			
Order	Contestant	Song	Florent Pagny	Jenifer	Mika	Garou
1	Flo	Angie – Rolling Stones			—	
2	Bruno Moreno	Sur ma peau – Louis Delort		—	—	—
3	Natacha Andreani	One Day / Reckoning Song – Asaf Avidan				
4	Théo	Caravane – Raphael	—	—	—	—
5	Wesley	You Raise Me Up – Josh Groban			—	—
6	Tifayne	Teardrops – Womack & Womack			—	
7	Marie Payet	This Love – Maroon 5	—	—	—	—
8	Fréro Delavega (Jérémy Frérot & Flo Delavega)	Caroline – MC Solaar	—	—		—
9	Lioan	Back to Black – Amy Winehouse				
10	Margie	L-O-V-E – Nat King Cole	—		—	—
11	Akram Sedkaoui	Still Loving You – Scorpions	—	—		
12	Alexia Rabé	Sorry Seems to Be the Hardest Word – Elton John		—	—	

==== Episode 5: February 8, 2014 ====
Order	Contestant	Song	Coaches' and Contestants' Choices			
Order	Contestant	Song	Florent Pagny	Jenifer	Mika	Garou
1	Noémie Garcia	Roar – Katy Perry			—	
2	Ginie Line	(Where Do I Begin?) Love Story – Shirley Bassey	—		—	—
3	Virgil	Les murs porteurs – Florent Pagny	—	—	—	—
4	Cloé	Toxic – Britney Spears			—	
5	Adrien Abelli	Nessun dorma – Giacomo Puccini		—	—	—
6	Mélissa Bon	Unfaithful – Rihanna	—	—		—
7	Roman	I Want You Back – The Jackson Five				
8	Carine Robert	Woman in Love – Barbra Streisand		—	—	—
9	Chloé	Dis-lui toi que je t'aime – Vanessa Paradis	—	—	—	—
10	Jérémy Ichou	The Man Who Can't Be Moved – The Script			—	
11	Liv	Let It Be – The Beatles	—	—	—	—
12	Najwa	Mercy – Duffy	—	—		—
13	Edu del Prado	Listen – Beyoncé		—	—	—

==== Episode 6: February 15, 2014 ====
Order	Contestant	Song	Coaches' and Contestants' Choices			
Order	Contestant	Song	Florent Pagny	Jenifer	Mika	Garou
1	Mamido	Halo – Beyoncé	—		—	
2	François Lachance	Impossible – James Arthur	—		—	—
3	Kenzy	La Mer – Charles Trenet	—	—	—	—
4	Youness	Abdel Kader – Rachid Taha, Khaled, Faudel	—	—		
5	Jacynthe Véronneau	The House of the Rising Sun – The Animals	—		—	
6	Laetitia Sole	Summertime Sadness – Lana Del Rey	—	—	—	—
7	Kissamilé	Hometown Glory – Adele		—		
8	Claudia Costa	Canção do Mar – Dulce Pontes	—	—		—N/a
9	Ayelya	Next to Me – Emeli Sandé	—		—N/a	—N/a
10	Teiva	Hymne à l'amour – Édith Piaf		—N/a	—N/a	—N/a
11	Sophie Delmas	Applause – Lady Gaga		—N/a	—N/a	—N/a

=== Stage 2 : « Battles Musicales » (Musical Battles) ===
During the battles, each coach was assisted by another singer as assistant coach, during the preparations to the show:

- Florent Pagny was assisted by Hélène Ségara and Pascal Obispo;
- Jenifer was assisted by Stanislas and Élodie Frégé;
- Mika was assisted by Kylie Minogue;
- Garou was assisted by Corneille and Gérald de Palmas.

==== Episode 7: February 22, 2014 ====
Order	Coach	Winner	Loser(s) or stolen	Coach(es) buzzing for loser (Winning coach in bold)	Song
1	Jenifer	Manon Trinquier	Ayelya	—	Wrecking Ball – Miley Cyrus
2	Mika	Marina D'Amico	Claudia Costa	**Florent Pagny**	La Mamma – Charles Aznavour
3	Florent Pagny	Wesley	Edu del Prado	—	Soulman – Ben l'Oncle Soul
4	Garou	Maximilien Philippe	Noémie Garcia	—	Sorry Seems to Be the Hardest Word – Elton John
5	Jenifer	Ginie Line	Sarah Jad	—	Come Back to Me – HollySiz
6	Mika	Caroline Savoie	Mélissa Bon	**Garou**, Jenifer, Florent Pagny	Wasting My Young Years – London Grammar
7	Florent Pagny	Alexia Rabé	Julie Erikssen	**Jenifer**	Tout – Lara Fabian

==== Episode 8: March 1, 2014 ====
Order	Coach	Winner	Loser(s) or stolen	Coach(es) buzzing for loser (Winning coach in bold)	Song
1	Florent Pagny	Stacey King	Aline Lahoud	—	Sober – Pink
2	Mika	Spleen	Pierre Edel	**Garou**, Jenifer, Florent Pagny	Bennie and the Jets – Elton John
3	Jenifer	Elliott	Leïla Huissoud; Florence Coste	—	C'est dit – Calogero
4	Garou	Flo	Roman	**Jenifer**	You Really Got Me – The Kinks
5	Mika	Élodie Martelet	Najwa	—	No Surprises – Radiohead
6	Garou	Mélissa Maugran	Alex	—	Eye of the Tiger – Survivor
7	Florent Pagny	Teiva	Jérémy Bertini	—	Vivo per lei – Andrea Bocelli

==== Episode 9: March 8, 2014 ====
Order	Coach	Winner	Loser(s) or stolen	Coach(es) buzzing for loser (Winning coach in bold)	Song
1	Jenifer	Emma Shaka	Jacynthe Véronneau	**Mika**, Florent Pagny	Les Amants d'un jour – Édith Piaf
2	Florent Pagny	Juliette Moraine	Carine Robert; Sophie Delmas	—	It's Raining Men – The Weather Girls
3	Garou	Igit	Charlie	**Florent Pagny**	Like a Hobo – Charlie Winston
4	Mika	Fabienne Della-Moniqua	Akram Sedkaoui	—	Life on Mars? – David Bowie
5	Jenifer	Amir Haddad	François Lachance	—	Radioactive – Imagine Dragons
6	Mika	Kendji Girac	Youness	—	Tous les mêmes – Stromae
7	Garou	Gwendal Marimoutou	Kissamilé	—	Fan – Pascal Obispo

==== Episode 10: March 15, 2014 ====
Order	Coach	Winner	Loser(s) or stolen	Coach(es) buzzing for loser (Winning coach in bold)	Song
1	Garou	Tifayne	Mamido	—	I'm Every Woman – Chaka Khan
2	Mika	Fréro Delavega	Quentin	—	Il y a – Vanessa Paradis
3	Jenifer	Lioan	Margie	—	Summertime – George Gershwin
4	Florent Pagny	Bruno Moreno	Jérémy Ichou	—	Pinball Wizard – The Who
5	Garou	Natacha Andreani	Cloé	**Mika**	Le chemin – Kyo
6	Jenifer	La Petite Shade	Rich Ly	—	Burn – Ellie Goulding
7	Florent Pagny	Adrien Abelli	Santo Barracato	—	Derrière l'amour – Johnny Hallyday

Teams after the battle rounds

Contestants retained after battle rounds, who will go to the live rounds (in blue, the contestants stolen by other teams):

Teams during the battles
Garou	Jenifer	Florent Pagny	Mika
Maximilien Philippe; Flo; Mélissa Maugran; Igit; Gwendal Marimoutou; Tifayne; Natacha Andreani	Manon Trinquier; Ginie Line; Elliott; Emma Shaka; Amir Haddad; Lioan; La Petite Shade	Wesley; Alexia Rabé; Stacey King; Teiva; Juliette Moraine; Bruno Moreno; Adrien Abelli	Marina D'Amico; Caroline Savoie; Spleen; Élodie Martelet; Fabienne Della-Moniqua; Kendji Girac; Fréro Delavega
Mélissa Bon (Mika); Pierre Edel (Mika)	Julie Erikssen (Florent Pagny); Roman (Garou)	Claudia Costa (Mika); Charlie (Garou)	Jacynthe Véronneau (Jenifer); Cloé (Garou)

=== Stage 3 : « épreuve ultime » ===
"L'épreuve ultime" was a new step introduced for the first time in the French show lasting two episodes. The process was designed to reduce contestants to six by team.

Within their respective teams, each coach would select three contestants each to sing a song of their choice. With each coach, two of his three contestants would forward to the live shows and the third would be eliminated.

Garou and Jenifer presented their "trios" on 22 March 2014, with Mika and Florent Pagny following suit on 29 March 2014. Later on, contestants Louane and Atef were invited in the first on 22 March, the second on 29 March.

==== Episode 11 - L'épreuve ultime 1: 22 March 2014 ====
At the beginning of the episode, the four coaches sang together "Vieille canaille" from Serge Gainsbourg and Eddy Mitchell, au début de l'émission.

Order	Coach	Contestant	Song	Result
1	Garou	Maximilien Philippe	Je t'aime – Lara Fabian	Saved
2	Garou	Mélissa Maugran	L'Air du vent – Native	Eliminated
3	Garou	Flo	Ces idées-là – Louis Bertignac	Saved
4	Garou	Gwendal Marimoutou	River Deep, Mountain High – Céline Dion	Eliminated
5	Garou	Pierre Edel	Amsterdam – Jacques Brel	Save
6	Garou	Natacha Andreani	Don't You Remember – Adele	Saved
7	Garou	Igit	Les Bonbons – Jacques Brel	Saved
8	Garou	Mélissa Bon	Paris-Seychelles – Julien Doré	Eliminated
9	Garou	Tifayne	L'Anamour – Serge Gainsbourg	Saved
10	Jenifer	Julie Erikssen	Stop! – Sam Brown	Eliminated
11	Jenifer	Ginie Line	Rue de la Paix – Zazie	Saved
12	Jenifer	Emma Shaka	Domino – Jessie J	Saved
13	Jenifer	Manon Trinquier	Sois heureux – Charles-Baptiste	Saved
14	Jenifer	Elliott	Summertime Sadness – Lana Del Rey	Eliminated
15	Jenifer	La Petite Shade	Battez-vous – Brigitte	Saved
16	Jenifer	Amir Haddad	Né en 17 à Leidenstadt – Fredericks Goldman Jones	Saved
17	Jenifer	Roman	Le vent nous portera – Noir Désir	Eliminated
18	Jenifer	Lioan	Amoureuse – Véronique Sanson	Saved

==== Episode 12 - L'épreuve ultime 2: 29 March 2014 ====
Order	Coach	Contestant	Song	Result
1	Mika	Élodie Martelet	Tandem – Vanessa Paradis	Saved
2	Mika	Spleen	Un garçon pas comme les autres (Ziggy) – Céline Dion	Saved
3	Mika	Fabienne Della-Moniqua	Marcia Baila – Rita Mitsouko	Eliminated
4	Mika	Marina D'Amico	Something's Got a Hold On Me – Etta James	Saved
5	Mika	Caroline Savoie	Vancouver – Véronique Sanson	Saved
6	Mika	Jacynthe Véronneau	Let It Be – The Beatles	Eliminated
7	Mika	Cloé	Hung Up – Madonna	Eliminated
8	Mika	Kendji Girac	Hotel California – The Eagles	Saved
9	Mika	Fréro Delavega	P.I.M.P. – 50 Cent	Saved
10	Florent Pagny	Stacey King	Sa raison d'être – Pascal Obispo	Saved
11	Florent Pagny	Adrien Abelli	My Heart Will Go On – Céline Dion	Eliminated
12	Florent Pagny	Bruno Moreno	L'Assasymphonie – Florent Mothe	Saved
13	Florent Pagny	Teiva	All Night Long (All Night) – Lionel Richie	Eliminated
14	Florent Pagny	Juliette Moraine	Bang-Bang – Sheila	Saved
15	Florent Pagny	Wesley	Believe – Cher	Saved
16	Florent Pagny	Claudia Costa	Under – Alex Hepburn	Saved
17	Florent Pagny	Charlie	Tous les cris les S.O.S. – Daniel Balavoine	Saved
18	Florent Pagny	Alexia Rabé	Queen of the Night – Whitney Houston	Eliminated

Contestants after "l'épreuve ultime"

Candidats retenus après l'épreuve ultime, et qui vont participer aux primes en direct :

Équipes à l'issue de l'épreuve ultime
Garou	Jenifer	Florent Pagny	Mika
Maximilien Philippe; Flo; Pierre Edel; Natacha Andreani; Igit; Tifayne	Ginie Line; Emma Shaka; Manon Trinquier; La Petite Shade; Amir Haddad; Lioan	Bruno Moreno; Stacey King; Juliette Moraine; Wesley; Charlie; Claudia Costa	Spleen; Élodie Martelet; Caroline Savoie; Marina D'Amico; Fréro Delavega; Kendji Girac

=== Stage 4 : « Primes » (Live Shows) ===
With 24 contestants remaining, six per team 6, in each live episode called "Primes", one or more contestants would be eliminated from the team. During the first two episodes, the contestants were divided into trios (2 per team). One contestant would be saved by public vote, one by coach of each respective team and one eliminated.

Légende	Contestant saved by public vote	Contestant saved by coach	Contestant eliminated

==== Episode 13 - prime 1: 5 April 2014 ====
At the beginning of the episode, the four coaches sang "Relax, Take It Easy" from Mika, "Tourner ma page" from Jenifer, "Et un jour une femme" from Florent Pagny, and "Seul" from Garou.

Order	Coach	Contestant	Song	Result
1	Garou	Natacha Andreani	Dernière danse – Indila	Saved by the coach
2	Garou	Pierre Edel	I Don't Want to Miss a Thing – Aerosmith	Eliminated
3	Garou	Igit	New York, New York – Frank Sinatra	Saved by the public
4	Jenifer	Amir Haddad	Counting Stars – OneRepublic	Saved by the public
5	Jenifer	Ginie Line	I Love Rock 'n' Roll – Joan Jett & the Blackhearts	Eliminated
6	Jenifer	Manon Trinquier	Ne me quitte pas – Jacques Brel	Saved by the coach
7	Florent Pagny	Juliette Moraine	Comme un boomerang – Serge Gainsbourg	Saved by the coach
8	Florent Pagny	Bruno Moreno	Alors on danse – Stromae	Eliminated
9	Florent Pagny	Stacey King	Si je m'en sors – Julie Zenatti	Saved by the public
10	Mika	Caroline Savoie	Somewhere Only We Know – Keane	Saved by the coach
11	Mika	Kendji Girac	Ma philosophie – Amel Bent	Saved by the public
12	Mika	Spleen	It's Oh So Quiet – Björk	Eliminated

Songs outside competition

Order	Singers	Song
1	Garou and his Team (Natacha Andreani, Pierre Edel, Igit)	Suspicious Minds – Elvis Presley
2	Jenifer and her Team (Amir Haddad, Ginie Line, Manon Trinquier)	Louxor j'adore – Philippe Katerine
3	Florent Pagny and his Team (Juliette Moraine, Bruno Moreno, Stacey King)	Face à la mer – Calogero & Passi
4	Mika and his Team (Caroline Savoie, Kendji Girac, Spleen)	Just Can't Get Enough – Depeche Mode

==== Episode 14 - prime 2: 12 April 2014 ====
Order	Coach	Contestant	Song	Result
1	Jenifer	La Petite Shade	Happy – Pharrell Williams	Saved by the public
2	Jenifer	Lioan	The Power of Love – Frankie Goes to Hollywood	Saved by the coach
3	Jenifer	Emma Shaka	Pour ne pas vivre seul – Dalida	Eliminated
4	Florent Pagny	Wesley	Laisse-moi t'aimer – Mike Brant	Saved by the coach
5	Florent Pagny	Charlie	Le coup d'soleil – Richard Cocciante	Saved by the public
6	Florent Pagny	Claudia Costa	Je l'aime à mourir – Francis Cabrel	Eliminated
7	Mika	Marina D'Amico	La complainte de la butte – Cora Vaucaire	Eliminated
8	Mika	Fréro Delavega	Sympathique (je ne veux pas travailler) – Pink Martini	Saved by the coach
9	Mika	Élodie Martelet	Wicked Game – Chris Isaak	Saved by the public
10	Garou	Maximilien Philippe	Hurt – Christina Aguilera	Saved by the public
11	Garou	Tifayne	Addicted To You – Avicii	Eliminated
12	Garou	Flo	Knockin' on Heaven's Door – Bob Dylan	Saved by the coach

Song outside competition

Order	Singers	Song
1	Jenifer and her Team (La Petite Shade, Lioan, Emma Shaka)	"Uptight (Everything's Alright)" – Stevie Wonder
2	Florent Pagny and his Team (Wesley, Charlie, Claudia Costa)	L'air du temps – Florent Pagny & Cécilia Cara
3	Mika and his Team (Marina D'Amico, Fréro Delavega, Élodie Martelet)	Elle me dit – Mika
4	Garou and his Team (Maximilien Philipe, Tifayne, Flo)	Sur la route – Gérald de Palmas

Contestants after first two episodes in prime stage

Teams after first stage of prime
Garou	Jenifer	Florent Pagny	Mika
Igit; Natacha Andreani; Maximilien Philippe; Flo	Amir Haddad; Manon Trinquier; La Petite Shade; Lioan	Stacey King; Juliette Moraine; Charlie; Wesley	Kendji Girac; Caroline Savoie; Élodie Martelet; Fréro Delavega

==== Episode 15 - prime 3: 19 April 2014 ====
At the beginning of the episode, the four coaches sang "Quand on arrive en ville" from Luc Plamondon and Michel Berger.

With 16 contestants remaining, 4 per team, the public vote saves one contestant, and the coach of each respective team another contestant with the third contestant from each team eliminated.

Order	Coach	Contestant	Song	Result
1	Jenifer	Manon Trinquier	Don't Stop the Music – Rihanna	Saved by the coach
2	Jenifer	Amir Haddad	Lucie – Pascal Obispo	Saved by the public
3	Jenifer	La Petite Shade	L'Eau à la bouche – Serge Gainsbourg	Saved by the public
4	Jenifer	Lioan	Toulouse – Claude Nougaro	Eliminated
5	Florent Pagny	Wesley	Get Lucky – Daft Punk	Saved by the coach
6	Florent Pagny	Juliette Moraine	Without You – Harry Nilsson	Eliminated
7	Florent Pagny	Stacey King	Rolling in the Deep – Adele	Saved by the public
8	Florent Pagny	Charlie	Somebody That I Used to Know – Gotye	Saved by the public
9	Garou	Flo	Ça (c'est vraiment toi) – Téléphone	Saved by the coach
10	Garou	Igit	Hit the Road Jack – Ray Charles	Saved by the public
11	Garou	Natacha Andreani	Wings – Birdy	Eliminated
12	Garou	Maximilien Philippe	Le Graal – Kyo	Saved by the public
13	Mika	Caroline Savoie	Pour que tu m'aimes encore – Céline Dion	Eliminated
14	Mika	Kendji Girac	Mad World – Tears for Fears	Saved by the public
15	Mika	Élodie Martelet	Osez Joséphine – Alain Bashung	Saved by the coach
16	Mika	Fréro Delavega	Let Her Go – Passenger	Saved by the public

==== Episode 16 - prime 4 - Quarter-finals: 26 April 2014 ====
With Final 12 remaining, three per team, the public vote saves one contestant each, coach of each respective team would save another contestant and one would be eliminated.

At the beginning of the 16th episode, the four coaches sang "Kiss" from Prince.

Order	Coach	Contestant	Song	Result
1	Mika	Kendji Girac	Allumer le feu – Johnny Hallyday	Saved by the public
2	Mika	Élodie Martelet	Stay – Rihanna & Mikky Ekko	Saved by the coach
3	Mika	Fréro Delavega	Je m'voyais déjà – Charles Aznavour	Eliminated
4	Garou	Maximilien Philippe	The Show Must Go On – Queen	Sauvé par le public
5	Garou	Flo	Ghost – Skip the Use	Eliminated
6	Garou	Igit	Vous les femmes – Julio Iglesias	Saved by the coach
7	Jenifer	Amir Haddad	Just the Way You Are – Bruno Mars	Saved by the public
8	Jenifer	Manon Trinquier	Je me suis fait tout petit – Georges Brassens	Saved by the coach
9	Jenifer	La Petite Shade	7 Seconds – Youssou N'Dour & Neneh Cherry	Eliminated
10	Florent Pagny	Charlie	Foule sentimentale – Alain Souchon	Eliminated
11	Florent Pagny	Stacey King	Je suis malade – Serge Lama	Saved by the coach
12	Florent Pagny	Wesley	Puisque tu pars – Jean-Jacques Goldman	Saved by the public

==== Episode 17 : prime 5 - Semi-finals: 3 May 2014 ====
In the semi-finals and the finals, the two best candidates per team qualify in each team.

Votes are based on 150 points in total: Each coach would place his 50 points between his final 2 contestants. He should not distribute them equally but should give advantage to one of his /her two finalists. The votes of the public will be allocated based on votes for a total of 100 points. One contestant per team reaches the final.

Order	Coach	Contestant	Song	Public vote result /100	Coach vote result /50	Total points /150	Result
1	Garou	Maximilien Philippe	Le blues du businessman – Claude Dubois	**56.0**	22	**78.0**	Qualified for the final
2	Garou	Igit	I Put a Spell on You – Screamin' Jay Hawkins	44.0	**28**	72.0	Eliminated
3	Mika	Élodie Martelet	Another Love – Tom Odell	27.3	**27**	54.3	Eliminated
4	Mika	Kendji Girac	Belle – Garou, Daniel Lavoie and Patrick Fiori	**72.7**	23	**95.7**	Qualified for the final
5	Florent Pagny	Stacey King	We Don't Need Another Hero – Tina Turner	31.0	**26**	57.0	Eliminated
6	Florent Pagny	Wesley	We Are the Champions – Queen	**69.0**	24	**93.0**	Qualified for the final
7	Jenifer	Manon Trinquier	Que je t'aime – Johnny Hallyday	42.1	**28**	70.1	Eliminated
8	Jenifer	Amir Haddad	Comme un fils – Corneille	**57.9**	22	**79.9**	Qualified for the final

Performances outside competition

Order	Singers	Song
1	The Final 8 (Maximilien Philippe, Igit, Élodie Martelet, Kendji Girac, Stacey King, Wesley, Manon Trinquier, Amir Haddad)	À nos actes manqués – Fredericks Goldman Jones
2	Team Garou (Maximilien Philippe and Igit)	It's Not Unusual – Tom Jones
3	Team Mika (Élodie Martelet and Kendji Girac)	Papaoutai – Stromae
4	Team Florent Pagny (Stacey King and Wesley)	Locked Out of Heaven – Bruno Mars
5	Team Jenifer (Manon Trinquier and Amir Haddad)	(I've Had) The Time of My Life – Bill Medley & Jennifer Warnes

==== Episode 18 - prime 6 - Final: 10 May 2014 ====
The final of season 3 is scheduled for 10 May 2014 on TF1.

The four finalists are:

Finalists
Garou	Jenifer	Florent Pagny	Mika
Maximilien Philippe	Amir Haddad	Wesley	Kendji Girac

Order	Coach	Contestant	Song	Duo with	Public vote result	Status
1	Florent Pagny	Wesley	Superstition – Stevie Wonder	/	10%	Fourth
8	Florent Pagny	Wesley	L'Envie d'aimer – Daniel Lévi	Pascal Obispo	10%	Fourth
11	Florent Pagny	Wesley	Et maintenant – Gilbert Bécaud	Florent Pagny	10%	Fourth
2	Garou	Maximilien Philippe	Comme d'habitude – Claude François	/	21%	Second
5	Garou	Maximilien Philippe	I'm Outta Love – Anastacia	Anastacia	21%	Second
10	Garou	Maximilien Philippe	With a Little Help from My Friends – Joe Cocker	Garou	21%	Second
3	Mika	Kendji Girac	Amor de mis amores & Volare – Gipsy Kings	/	**51%**	**Winner**
7	Mika	Kendji Girac	Temps à nouveau – Jean-Louis Aubert	Jean-Louis Aubert	**51%**	**Winner**
12	Mika	Kendji Girac	L'Aigle noir – Barbara	Mika	**51%**	**Winner**
4	Jenifer	Amir Haddad	All of Me – John Legend	/	18%	Third
6	Jenifer	Amir Haddad	La Voix des sages – Yannick Noah	Yannick Noah	18%	Third
9	Jenifer	Amir Haddad	Si seulement je pouvais lui manquer – Calogero	Jenifer	18%	Third
