= Jody (singer) =

Julie Erikssen (Jody)
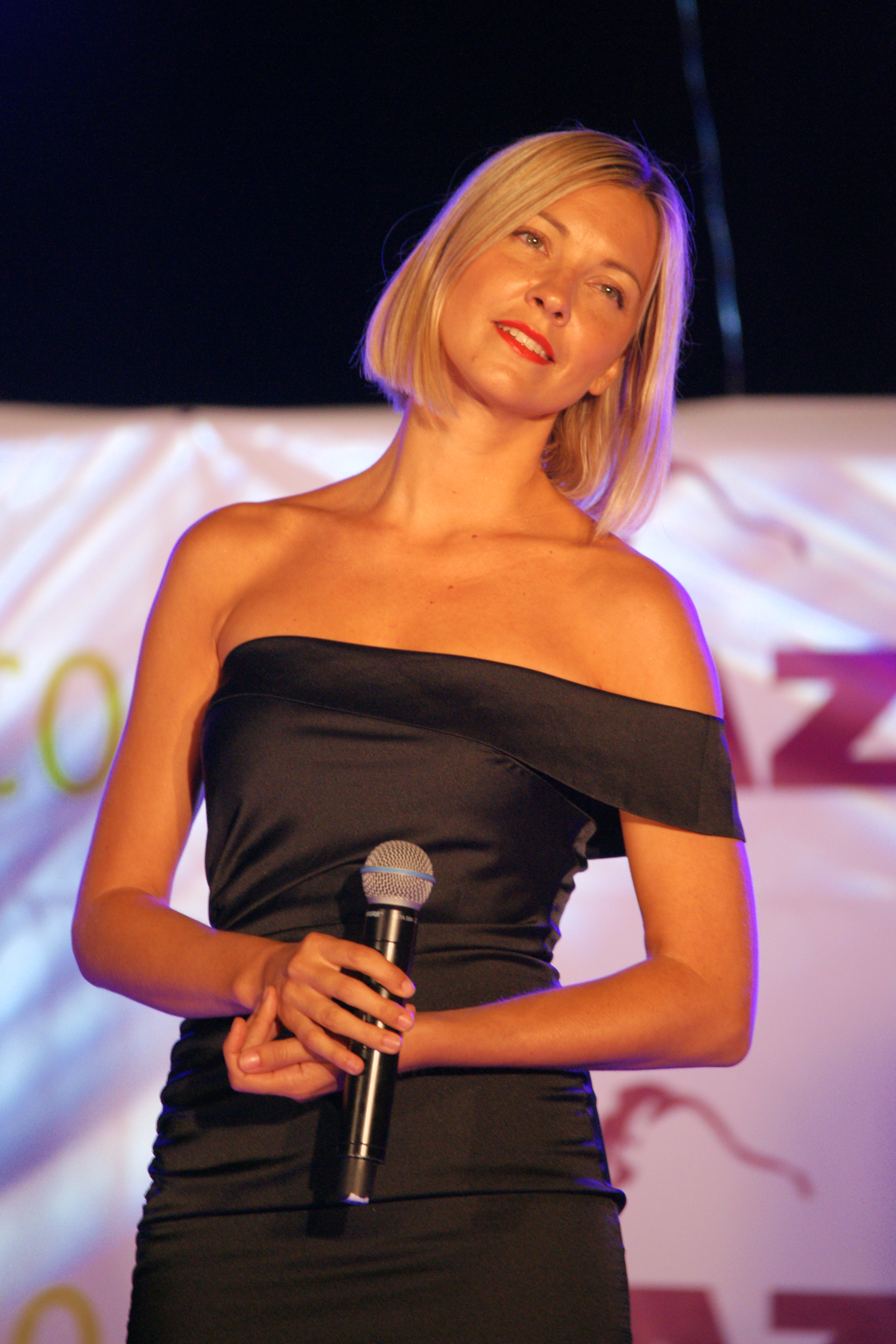
- Julie Erikssen, Coartjazz 2018, Coaraze

Background information
- Birth name: Julie Erikssen
- Born: France
- Genres: Folk / Jazz
- Occupation: Singer
- Instrument: Vocals
- Years active: 2002–2004 (Jody); 2014–present (Julie Erikssen)

Julie Erikssen, is a French jazz singer and songwriter who gained fame in 2002 with the song "Dans ce monde" which she followed by another hit in 2004 titled "Entre l'ombre et la lumière" by the name of "Jody", before she started jazz.

== In The voice, la plus belle voix ==
In 2014, she resurfaced as a contestant on the third season of the French music contest The Voice: la plus belle voix on TF1, in which she auditioned with the Mika song "Underwater" with two of the four judges, Florent Pagny and Jenifer turned their chairs, although Mika, who was also a judge did not turn his chair. She opted to be on Team Florent. In the battle round, she was ousted in competition with Alexia Rabé after both sang "Tout" from Lara Fabian. Although Jenifer stole her for a second round, but she failed to proceed further than round 2 of the live shows.

Performances during the show

- Blind Audition – "Underwater" from Mika (in Team Florent Pagny)
- Battle round – "Tout" from Lara Fabian (lost battle against Alexia Rabé. Stolen by Jenifer to be in her team)
- L'épreuve ultime round – "Stop!" from Sam Brown (against Team Jenifer members Ginie Line, Emma Shaka – Eliminated)

After the contest, she announced she was releasing her EP Breathe online.

== Discography ==
=== Albums ===
- Julie Erikssen – "Out Of Chaos"

Format : CD / Date de sortie : 2 février 2018 / Label: Soundsurveyor / ASIN : B078HXJJTB.

=== EPs ===
as Julie Erikssen

- 2014: Breathe EP

=== Singles ===
As Jody

Year	Album	Peak positions		
Year	Album	FR	BEL (Wa)	SWI
2002	"Dans ce monde"	81	23	95
2004	"Entre l'ombre et la lumière"	64	–	–
