= Dear Paris =

2024 black comedy film by Marjane Satrapi

- Film poster
- Directed by: Marjane Satrapi
- Written by: Marjane Satrapi; Marie Madinier
- Produced by: François-Xavier Decraene; Mattias Ripa
- Starring: Monica Bellucci; Eduardo Noriega; Gwendal Marimoutou; Ben Aldridge; Martina García; Rossy de Palma; André Dussollier; Alex Lutz; Roschdy Zem
- Edited by: Stéphane Roche
- Music by: Pascal Lengagne
- Distributed by: StudioCanal
- Release dates: 12 June 2024 (France); 24 November 2024 (Torino Film Festival)
- Running time: 99 minutes
- Country: France
- Language: French

Dear Paris (In French: Paradis Paris) is a 2024 French black comedy film directed by Marjane Satrapi. It was the final film that Satrapi directed prior to her death in June 2026.

== Plot ==
In Paris, several people connected in one way or another to death cross paths. Giovanna Bianchi (Monica Bellucci), a narcissistic and successful Italian opera singer, wakes up at a morgue to realise that only few people have paid respects for her death. Meanwhile, Mike (Ben Aldridge), a British stuntman, questions his job following an accident with his son. An eccentric elderly Colombian lady named Dolores (Rossy de Palma), the grandmother of a teenage girl, makes a pact with Death to stay alive longer, while a suicidal teenager named Marie-Cerise (Charline Balu-Emane) is kidnapped, forcing her to talk with her captor in a way she could not do with her therapist. Another character, Édouard Emmard (André Dussollier), the presenter of a famous true-crime television program, is considering his own death.

== Cast ==
- Monica Bellucci as Giovanna Bianchi
- Eduardo Noriega as Rafael Turina
- Gwendal Marimoutou as Badou
- Ben Aldridge as Mike Webster
- Roméo Grialou as Aidan Webster, Mike's son
- Martina García as Gloria
- Rossy de Palma as Dolores, mother of Gloria
- Inès Gaudin Prat as Mathilda, daughter of Gloria
- André Dussollier as Édouard Emmard
- Alex Lutz as Xavier
- Roschdy Zem as Jean-Paul
- Charline Balu-Emane as Marie-Cerise
- Charlotte Dauphin as Christine, mother of Marie-Cerise
- Énora Malagré as Mylène
- Marjane Satrapi as a filmmaker

== Release and production ==
Dear Paris was released in France on 12 June 2024. The film, whose filming was entirely set and produced in Paris, began in October 2023.
