= Gwendal Marimoutou =

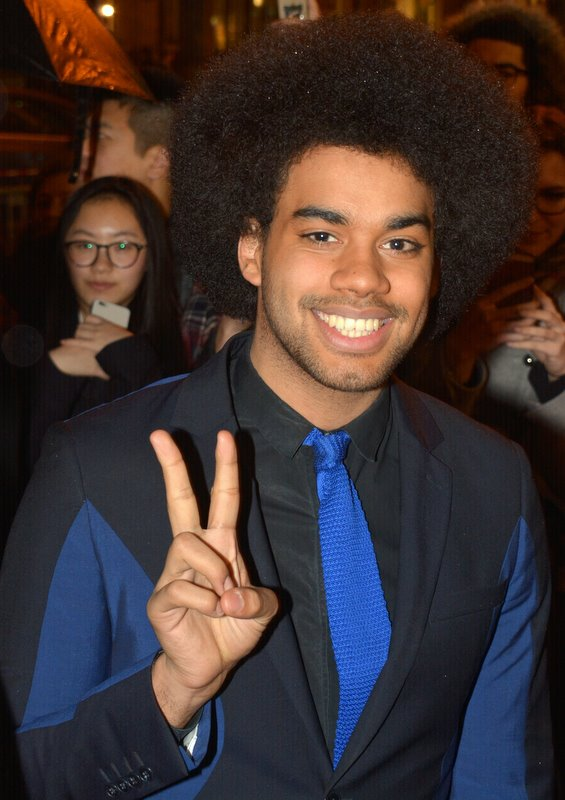
- Gwendal Marimoutou in 2017

Background information
- Born: 15 June 1995 (age 31); Paris, France
- Occupations: Actor; Singer; Television presenter
- Years active: 2009–present

Gwendal Marimoutou (born 15 June 1995) is a French actor, singer and television presenter of Martinican origin.

== Early life and education ==
Gwendal Marimoutou was born in 1995. From a very young age, he was passionate about singing and performing. He began his career at age 11 in the musical The Lion King, where he learned singing, dancing, and acting at the "Lion King's School." He simultaneously pursued artistic training at the Académie internationale de comédie musicale. His mother, Gwénola Thépault, originally from Carhaix in Brittany, managed a rock band in the 1980s. His father was a musician of Martinique origin.

=== La France a un incroyable talent (2009) ===
In 2009, when turned 14 years old, he participated in the fourth season of France's Got Talent on M6, and was eliminated from the show during the semi-final.

=== The Voice (2014) ===
In 2014, he participated in the third season of The Voice – La plus belle voix on TF1. He was coached by Garou, but he was eliminated during the Final Test, this participation allowed him to be nominated for the Lauriers TV Awards in the category of Best artist from a musical talent show.

== Career ==
=== Theatre acting and Pop's Cool ===
After his participation in The Voice, he was spotted by France Gall, and he joined the cast of the show Résiste on the stage of the Palais des Sports in Paris starting from November 2015, and touring throughout France in 2016.

Subsequently, he went on numerous auditions and joined the cast of the musical comedy Ados by Olivier Solivérès in 2012. The show was quite successful and ran for several seasons in several Parisian theatres.

Between 2012 and 2013, he was part of the group Pop's Cool produced by the Canal J channel, as part of a series of twelve episodes which follows a group of teenagers during the preparation of an album and the recording of a music video.

=== Presenter on Gulli ===
Gwendal Marimoutou hosted programmes on the children's channel Gulli, notably in Gu'live. He hosted the programme from July 2016 to July 2022 on Gulli and on YouTube since September 2025 alongside Joan Faggianelli, Anaïs Delva, Gaëlle Marie and Moussier Tombola.

In 2020, during the Covid-19 lockdown, he hosted the show Trop bien chez toi , with Joan Faggianelli.

He returned to the channel in 2025 by hosting the show La grande Gulli party! with Joan Faggianelli.

=== Film and television actor ===
In 2013, he got his first film role in the movie Les Profs by Pierre-François Martin-Laval.

He acted in television series on TF1 such as Sam, where he played Sasha in 2020 and 2021. He also played the role of Randal Mortimer in Léo Matteï, Brigade des mineurs with Jean-Luc Reichmann, as a guest in 2025 and as a main character since 2026. He also appeared in the daily series Tout pour la lumière alongside Vike, Marco Bouttin, Clément Massy, Loris Triolo and Alex Doux, who were also participants in The Voice.

In 2027, he will return to the stage playing one of the main roles in the musical Kinky Boots at the Folies Bergère as Simon aka Lola, a drag queen.

== Personal life ==
In 2024, he announced that he had been the victim of sexual assault by the singer Stéphane Métro.

== Television ==
=== Presenter ===
- 2016 – 2022: Gu'live on Gulli, co-hosted with Joan Faggianelli, Anaïs Delva, Gaëlle Marie and Moussier Tombola
- 2020: Too Good at Home! on Gulli, co-hosted with Joan Faggianelli, Mac Lesggy, Gaëlle Marie and Moussier Tombola
- 2025: The big Gulli party! on Gulli, co-hosted with Joan Faggianelli

=== Participation ===
- 2009: La France a un incroyable talent (season 4) on M6: contestant
- 2013: Pop's cool – Captation du concert à La Cigale on Gulli and Canal J
- 2014: The Voice: La Plus Belle Voix (saison 3) on TF1: contestant
- since 2016: Vendredi tout est permis on TF1: participant
- 2018 – 2019: Drôlement Bêtes: les Animaux en Questions on France 4: participant
- 2020 – 2021 and since 2025: Mot de passe: participant
- 2019: Together, tous avec moi on M6: participant
- 2021: Le Grand Quiz: Spéciale permis de conduire, en duo avec Amandine Petit on TF: participant
- 2023: Le Meilleur Pâtissier Celebrity season 5 on Gulli: contestant
- 2024: Les Traîtres Season 3 on M6: contestant
- 2024: Le Meilleur Pâtissier, spécial célébrités – saison 7 on Gulli: contestant
- 2025: 100% logique on France 2: contestant
- 2026: La Roue de la fortune on M6

== Filmography ==
=== Films ===
- 2013: Les Profs by Pierre-François Martin-Laval: Adrien "Jackson Five"
- 2024: Paradis Paris by Marjane Satrapi: Badou, dit Fred

=== Television ===
- 2013: La smala s'en mêle by Didier Grousset
- 2016: Les Témoins by Hervé Hadmar: Denis / Fabien (season 2, 3 episodes)
- 2020 – 2021: Sam by Claire Maréchale: Sasha (seasons 4 and 5, 4 episodes)
- Since 2025: Léo Mattéï, Brigade des mineurs by Nathalie Lecoutre: Randal Mortimer (guest season 12, main season 13)
- 2025: Tout pour la lumière by Nicolas Herdt: Jacob (season 1)

=== Music video ===
- 2026: Dansons, music video for the Céline Dion song celebrating Paris and love, dance couple with Lola Dubini

== Musicals ==
- 2010: The Lion King: Simba
- 2012: Ados by Olivier Solivérès
- 2015–2016: Résiste by France Gall, show at the palais des sports de Paris, tours and album: Tennessee
- 2027: Kinky Boots: Simon / Lola

== Discography ==
=== Singles ===
- 2004: Bouge de là (Pop's Cool)
- 2015: La Groupie du pianiste (reprise)
- 2020: Un SOS pour Noel, feat. Aurélie Konaté
- 2024: Ça va aller
- 2024: Moi qui rêvais d'avoir un frère, feat. Sacha Tomassian et Tahar Rahim
- 2024: Il faut des copains, feat. Tahar Rahim, Aurélie Konaté, Jean-Michel Vaubien, Alexis Tomassian
- 2025: Tout pour la lumière (opening credits)
- 2025: Dans ma tête (single from Tout pour la lumière)

== Bibliography ==
- Mazoyer, Émilie (24 October 2022). "Gwendal Marimoutou est Simba dans la comédie musicale Le Roi Lion" (audio). Radio France..
- Chazot, Sylvain; Piquemal, Marie (12 December 2022). "Gwendal Marimoutou : « Je veux dire aux enfants qu'il ne faut pas avoir peur de parler » des violences sexuelles dont ils sont victimes". Libération..
