= Romeo Lahoud =

Lebanese theatre director and composer (1931–2022)

- Born: Romeo Raphael Lahoud; 22 January 1931; Amsheet, Greater Lebanon
- Died: 22 November 2022 (aged 91)
- Education: Saint Joseph School; La Scala
- Occupations: Theatre director Composer

Romeo Raphael Lahoud (Arabic: روميو روفايل لحود; 22 January 1931 – 22 November 2022) was a Lebanese theatre director, composer, and author.

== Biography ==
After studying at the Saint Joseph School, Lahoud began his career in 1955 as an impresario, in which he brought stars such as Louis Armstrong, Sacha Distel, and the Grand Ballet de Monte Carlo to Lebanon. As a writer, set designer, producer, and director, he played a part in over 30 musicals which featured prominent figures in Lebanese theatre, such as Sabah and Salwa Al Katrib.

Lahoud studied theatrical directing in Las Vegas and scenography at La Scala in Milan under professor Carlo Montecamozzo. He founded five theatres: Le Phoenicia, Le Martinez, L’Élysée, Le Romeo Lahoud, and L'Athénée. He also founded a folkloric troupe in Libya in 1967. He was the first Arab and Lebanese artist to perform at the Olympia in Paris and the Palais Royal des Beaux Arts in Brussels.

Romeo Lahoud died on 22 November 2022, at the age of 91.

== Works ==
- Al Shallal (1963)
- Mawal (1965)
- Mijana (1966)
- Ataba (1967)
- Les nuits libanaises (1967)
- La Citadelle (1968)
- Faramane (1970)
- Mahrajane (1971)
- Phenicie 80 (1971)
- Awassef (1971)
- Mine jaouz mine (1972)
- Singof Singof (1974)
- W Harab Chahine (1975)
- Bint el Jabal (1977)
- Amira Zmorrod (1978)
- Ismak bi Albi (1978)
- Oxygene (1979)
- Yasmine (1980)
- Namroud (1981)
- Superstar (1981)
- Hikayat Amal (1983)
- Al Helm el Telett (1985)
- Layali Zamane (1995)
- Tariq El chams (2014)
- Caricature (2016)
