= Le chant des sirènes (song) =

Single by Fréro Delavega

from the album Fréro Delavega
- Released: 2015
- Genre: Pop
- Length: 2:58
- Songwriters: Flo Delavega, Jérémy Frérot

"Le chant des sirènes" is a song by Fréro Delavega from the album Fréro Delavega.

== Charts ==
=== Weekly charts ===
Chart (2015)	Peak position
Belgium (Ultratop 50 Wallonia)	14
France (SNEP)	9

=== Year-end charts ===
Chart (2015)	Position
Belgium (Ultratop Wallonia)	43
France (SNEP)	22

Chart (2016)	Position
France (SNEP)	158
