= Lebanon in the Eurovision Song Contest =

Lebanon
- Participating broadcaster: Télé Liban (TL)

Participation summary
- Appearances: 0 (1 withdrawn entry)

External links
- teleliban.com.lb

Lebanon has never been represented at the Eurovision Song Contest. The Lebanese participating broadcaster, Télé Liban, was set to make its debut at the Eurovision Song Contest 2005 with the song "Quand tout s'enfuit" performed by Aline Lahoud, but withdrew due to Lebanese laws barring the broadcast of Israeli content.

== 2005 contest ==
On 21 October 2004, Ibrahim El Khoury, President Director General of Télé Liban, stated that the broadcaster intended to make its debut at the Eurovision Song Contest 2005. On 3 November 2004, Télé Liban announced that it had internally selected Aline Lahoud to represent Lebanon. Her orient-occident song "Quand tout s'enfuit", sung in French and written by Jad Rahbani and Romeo Lahoud, was chosen in mid-February. Lahoud was scheduled to present her song in the semi-final held on 19 May 2005.

The original album cover of the Eurovision Song Contest 2005, showing the participation of Lebanon. (bottom row, third from right)

On 15 December 2004, Télé Liban announced that financial constraints forced them to withdraw from the contest, and denied reports that it was due to political conflicts with Israel. However, five days later, the European Broadcasting Union (EBU) reached an agreement with Télé Liban and they were put on the official list of participants.

In early March 2005, the official Télé Liban website for the contest did not list Israel as a participant. After the EBU asked the broadcaster to resolve the issue within 24 hours or face disqualification, the site removed the complete list of participants and replaced the page with a link to Eurovision.tv, the EBU official website for the contest.

Later that month, the EBU asked Télé Liban to assure that they would broadcast the entire contest, including the Israeli entry, without interruption. Télé Liban could not guarantee that request, so on 18 March 2005, it once again announced its withdrawal from the contest. Lebanese legislation prohibited the broadcast of Israeli content on Lebanese television networks. Télé Liban wrote on its website that it "is not permitted to broadcast the performance of the Israeli participant, thereby breaching the rules of the Eurovision Song Contest 2005" and forcing its withdrawal. Since Télé Liban withdrew almost three months after the 15 December "no consequence" withdrawal deadline, the broadcaster was penalised, losing its participation fee and was served with a three-year ban.

== Subsequent events ==
With the three-year ban, Télé Liban was not eligible to re-enter the Eurovision Song Contest until 2009.

In 2007, Lebanon-born singer Mika stated that he was interested in entering the contest for Lebanon in 2008, but for one of the other Lebanese television stations that would not be impacted by the ban, such as the Lebanese Broadcasting Corporation International or Future Television. Neither broadcaster was a member of the EBU, but was eligible to join the organisation. His plans never came to fruition, and there were no further attempts to join the contest following the expiration of the ban imposed on Télé Liban. Mika himself, however, eventually became involved in Eurovision, as he was one of the presenters of the 2022 contest.

== Participation overview ==
Table key
◇	Entry selected but did not compete

Year	Artist	Song	Language	Final	Points	Semi	Points
2005	Aline Lahoud ◇	"Quand tout s'enfuit" ◇	French ◇	Withdrawn			
