= Jean-Michel Vaubien =

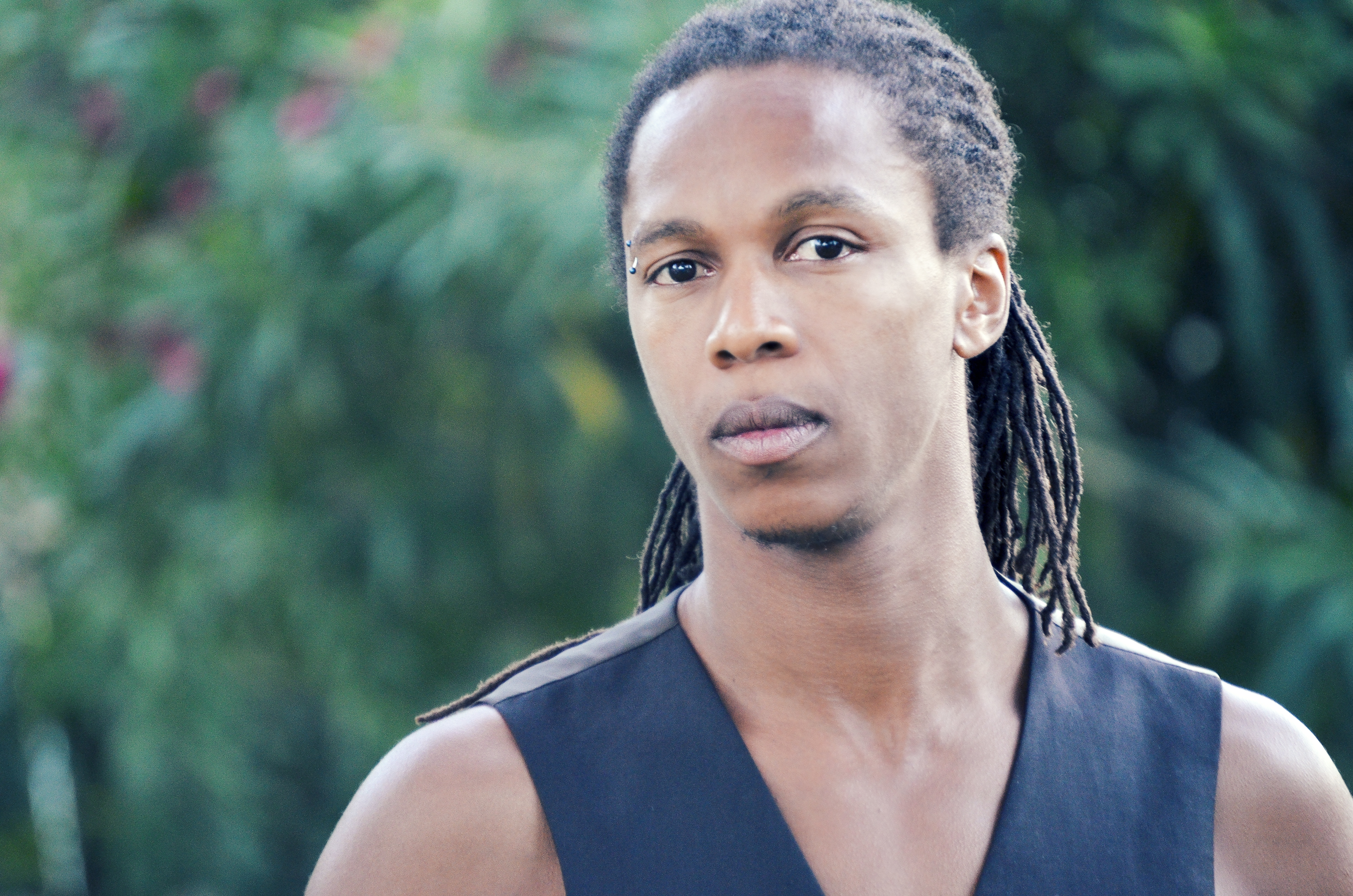
- Occupations: Singer, actor, dancer
- Years active: 2000–present

Jean-Michel Vaubien, is a French singer and actor.

== Biography ==
Jean-Michel studies dancing and acting at the International Academy of Dance in Paris. He plays in several musicals : Fame, Avenue Q, D.I.S.C.O., le spectacle musical...

He's the French voice of several actors on movies and television.

== Musicals ==
- 2013–2014 : D.I.S.CO., le spectacle musical by Agnès Boury and Stéphane Laporte, dir Stéphane Jarny - Folies Bergère, tour
- 2012–2013 : Swinging life by and dir Valéry Rodriguez - Bobino, tour
- 2011–2012 : Avenue Q by Robert Lopez, Jeff Marx and Jeff Whitty, adaptation Bruno Gaccio, dir Dominique Guillo - Bobino
- 2012 : Gospel sur la Colline by Benjamin Faleyras - Casino de Paris
- 2010–2011 : Scooby-doo contre les pirates fantômes by Jim Millan, adaptation Grégoire Dey, dir Rémy Caccia - Tour
- 2010–2011 : Fame by José Fernandez, Jacques Levy, Steve Margoshes, dir Ned Grujic - Trianon, tour
- 2009–2010 : Kirikou et Karaba by Michel Ocelot, dir Wayne McGregor - Tour
- 2008–2009 : Fame by José Fernandez, Jacques Levy, Steve Margoshes, dir Ned Grujic - Théâtre Comedia
- 2006–2007 : Dora et les pirates, Louvin Production - Zénith de Paris, tour
- 2005–2008 : Swinging fantasy, dir Jim Light - Enghien-les-Bains, Deauville
- 2005 : Roméo et Juliette, dir Yohann Azran
- 2004 : Les 7 pêchés capitaux, dir Frédéric Strouck - Théâtre du Gymnase
- 2000–2001 : Mots d’arts, dir Myriam Delourme - Théâtre Déjazet

== Filmography ==
- 2007 : Soaperette, TV

== French dubbing ==
=== Cinema ===
- 2008 : The Lazarus Project : Robbie (Malcolm Goodwin)
- 2009 : The Proposal : Jordan (Jerrell Lee)
- 2010 : The Search for Santa Paws : Rasta (Christopher Massey)
- 2012 : Jeff, Who Lives at Home : Kevin (Evan Ross)
- 2013 : Dallas Buyers Club : Sunflower (Bradford Cox)
- 2014 : Get on Up : Baby Roy (Keith Robinson)
- 2014 : The Maze Runner : Jeff (Jacob Latimore)

=== Television ===
- 2008 : Murdoch Mysteries : Driscoll (Robbie Amell)
- 2008 : Primeval : Lucien (Jacob Anderson)
- 2010 : Hannah Montana : Iyaz
- 2010 : Cougar Town : Kevin (LaMarcus Tinker)
- 2010 : The Big C : The minister (Teagle F. Bougere)
- 2010 : Treme : Dr. Jason Frasor (Marcus Lyle Brown)
- 2011 : 12 Dates of Christmas : Michael (Stephan James)
- 2011 : Switched at Birth : Carter (John Keston)
- 2012 : Body of Proof : Marley (Sean Kingston)
- 2013–2014 : Almost Human : Luca (Alex Barima)
- 2013 : Boardwalk Empire : De-Ernie Coates (Surya Botofasina)
- 2013 : Castle (TV series) : Kyle (David Blue)
- 2013 : The Newsroom : Zach (Shaun Brown)
- 2013 : The Cheating Pact : Detective Joyce (Pancho Demmings)
- 2013 : Fir Crazy : Isaac (Arnold Pinnock)
- 2014 : Looking : Frank (O. T. Fagbenle)

=== Animation ===
- 2014 : Blaze and the Monster Machines : Crusher (Kevin Michael Richardson)
- 2015 : Fresh Beat Band of Spies : voix chantée de Scott (Thomas Hobson)
- 2023 : La voix de Sébastien dans la petite sirène.
- 2024 : Hazbin Hotel : Husk (Keith David)

== Discography ==
=== Albums ===
- 2008 : Fame
- 2014 : DISCO, le spectacle musical
- 2014 : Hansel et Gretel, la comédie musicale
- 2015 : Gospel sur la Colline, la comédie musicale
- 2015 : "Les Funambules", Double-Album au profit de l'association "Le Refuge"

=== Single ===
- 2013 : Un faux départ, single with the collectif Les grandes voix des comédies musicales.
