= Aline Lahoud =

Lebanese singer

Aline Lahoud ألين لحود
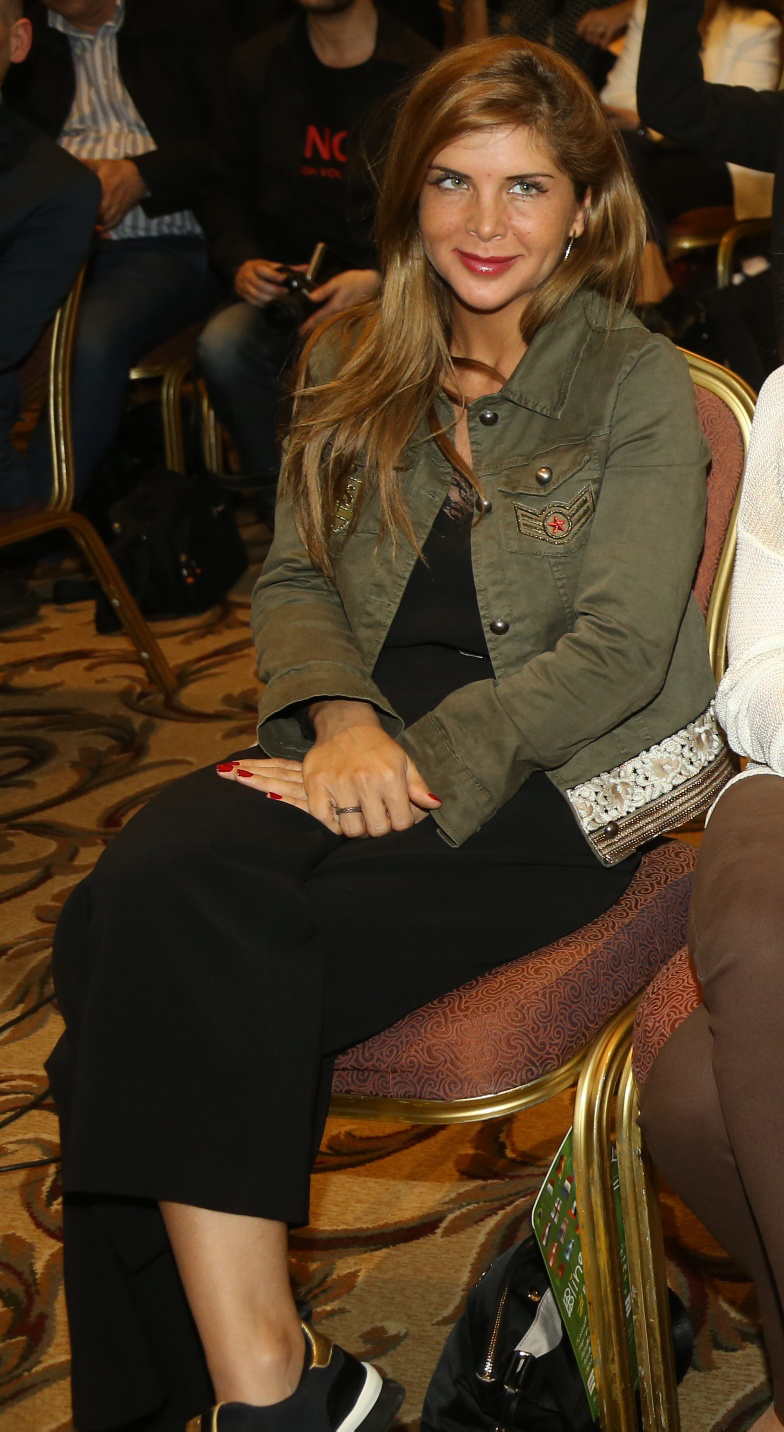
- Lahoud in April 2017

Background information
- Born: 2 March 1981 (age 45); Beirut, Lebanon
- Origin: Lebanon
- Genres: Pop, soul
- Occupation: Singer
- Website: www.alinelahoud.com

Aline Lahoud (Arabic: ألين لحود, romanized: Alīn Laḥūd; born 2 March 1981) is a Lebanese singer.

== Life ==
Lahoud's parents are singer and stage actress Salwa Al Katrib and producer Nahi Lahoud. She studied singing and dramatic art from 2002 until 2006. In 2006, she received a BA degree in Communication Arts, majoring in Screenplay and Directing Studies.

== Career ==
After winning the international prize at the Megahit-International Mediterranean Song Contest in Turkey, Lahoud was selected by Télé Liban to represent Lebanon in the Eurovision Song Contest 2005, with the song "Quand tout s'enfuit". However, Lebanon withdrew from the contest.

In 2014, Lahoud participated in the third season of The Voice: la plus belle voix broadcast on French TV channel TF1. However, after the initial battle round, Lahoud was eliminated from the show.
