= Fréro Delavega (album) =

Studio album by Fréro Delavega
- Released: 18 July 2014
- Recorded: 2014
- Label: Capitol Music

Singles from Fréro Delavega
- 1. "Sweet Darling" Released: 2014

Fréro Delavega is the 2014 self-titled album of the French musical duo Fréro Delavega and their official debut studio album. The 18-track album released on 18 July 2014 on Capitol Music France appeared at number one of SNEP, the official French Albums Chart, also becoming a hit in Belgium.

== Track list ==
CD1

1. "Il y a" (3:03)
2. "Sweet Darling" (2:42)
3. "Le Chant des sirènes" (2:58)
4. "Même si c'est très loin" (2:41)
5. "Mon héroïne" (2:37)
6. "Mon petit pays" (3:13)
7. "Que toi" (2:38)
8. "Reviens" (3:13)
9. "Tour de chance" (2:59)
10. "Sur la route" (2:45)
11. "Queenstone" (3:02)
12. "De l'autre côté" (3:40)

CD2

1. "Onde sensuelle" (3:10)
2. "Price Tag" (2:54)
3. "Save Tonight" (3:02)
4. "Soulstorm" (3:48)
5. "Sexy Bitch" (3:21)
6. "Caroline" (3:12)

== Charts ==
=== Weekly charts ===
Chart (2014)	Peak position
Belgian Albums (Ultratop Flanders)	198
Belgian Albums (Ultratop Wallonia)	3
French Albums (SNEP)	1
Swiss Albums (Schweizer Hitparade)	50

=== Year-end charts ===
Chart (2014)	Position
Belgian Albums (Ultratop Wallonia)	32
French Albums (SNEP)	25
Chart (2015)	Position
Belgian Albums (Ultratop Wallonia)	13
French Albums (SNEP)	15
Chart (2016)	Position
Belgian Albums (Ultratop Wallonia)	65
