= Salwa Al Katrib =

Lebanese singer and stage actress (1953–2009)

- سلوى صليبا القطريب
- Born: Salwa Al Katrib; 17 September 1953; Tripoli, Lebanon
- Died: 4 March 2009 (aged 55); Lebanon
- Resting place: Amsheet
- Education: Arabic French baccalaureat
- Occupation: Singer
- Years active: 1975–1990s
- Known for: Bent Al Jabal (Mountain Girl)
- Spouse: Nahi Lahoud
- Children: Aline Lahoud

Salwa Al Katrib (also spelled Salwa Al Qatrib, Arabic: سلوى القطريب; 17 September 1953 – 4 March 2009) was a Lebanese singer and stage actress best known for her roles in Emerald Princess (Al Amira Zmurrod) and Mountain Girl (Bent Al Jabal). She was the wife of Nahi Lahoud and the mother of aspiring Lebanese actress and singer Aline Lahoud. She enjoyed most of her fame in the theatrical circle in Lebanon and the Arab world between 1974 and 2005. She died of cerebral hemorrhage in 2009.

== Biography ==
Salwa Al Katrib was born on 17 September 1953 in Tripoli, Lebanon, to a family of musicians, her father being the musician Saliba Al Katrib. Her talent was discovered by Lebanese playwright and theater director Romeo Lahoud.

Salwa's was first cast by Lahoud in a play called "Singof Singof" with former Miss Universe Georgina Rizk and singer Tony Hanna in 1975. She won many awards during her career. Subsequently, in 1975 Said Akl awarded Katrib for her acting and singing abilities. She played in 12 musicals under the direction of Romeo Lahoud: "Bint el Jabal" with Antoine Kerbage in 1977, then with Melhem Barakat in "Amira Zmorrod". In 1979, she sang with Elie Choueri in "Oxygene". In 1980, she played "Yasmine" with Abdo Yaghi. In 1982, she was "Superstar" with Alec Khalaf. In 1983, she played in "Hikayat Amal" with Ghassan Saliba and Elias Elias.

Simone Marouani, the artistic director of the French singer Serge Lama proposed to Salwa to become an international star in France and the US. Salwa came to the attention of Simone through a TV show aired on the French national television channel TF1. Simone proposed to meet in Casino du Liban in September 1984 after Lama's concert there. Salwa was represented by her husband Nahi and Romeo her brother-in-law. The two men were enthusiastic about the deal but they were met with Salwa's refusal because she didn't want to leave her young daughter Aline. In 1985, she was the star on "Al Hilm el Talett", and she performed at the festival of Bosra in Syria, and at the festival of Timgad in Algeria. She sang more than 150 songs composed by Romeo Lahoud, Zaki Nassif, Toufic Bacha, Elie Choueri, Elias Rahbani and Melhem Barakat. In 1986 Romeo traveled to Paris, met with the Marouanis and returned with five-year contract which Salwa also refused.

== Awards ==
She won many awards, including, a "Special Award of Appreciation" from the mayor of Los Angeles in 1989; the "Jarash Event First Prize" and the Jordanian government's promotion and prestige in 1987%, the first prize of the Gold Eagle in Abu Dhabi for her song "Zikrayate" in 1986. She also won the Murex d'Or in 2005 and in 2009.

King Hussein of Jordan, presidents Camille Chamoun, Amine Gemayel, Michel Aoun and Elias Hrawi were her most famous supporters. Mohammed Abdel Wahab, the great Egyptian composer, asked her to sing his famous "Anta Omri". Her last appearance on TV was with Neshan Der Haroutounian in "Maestro" (2005). In 2006, she decided to stop singing because she was astonished by the degradation of the artistic situation in Lebanon.

== Death and legacy ==
She died on 4 March 2009, aged 55. She was widely famous and respected in the Arab world. President Michel Suleiman honored her by giving her the golden medal of the Lebanese republic. She was married to Nahi Lahoud her producer and artistic director. Shortly after her death, her husband announced that he is in the process of working on a tribute film honoring her artistic life.

== Work ==
=== Theatre ===
- Singof Singof : 1974
- Bint El Jabal : 1977
- Amira Zomrod : 1978
- Ismal bi Albi : 1978
- Oxygene : 1979
- Yasmine : 1980
- Superstar : 1982
- Hikayat Amal : 1983
- Helm Thalett : 1985
- Bint El Jabal : 1988 (remake)
- Yasmine : 1998 (remake)

=== Television ===
- Alwane 1975 (Tele Liban with Riad Charara)
- Layali Sheherazade 1980 (Tele Liban with Georges Chalhoub)
- Salwa Show 1 1984 (Tele Liban with Ghassan Saliba)
- Independence Day 1984 (Tele Liban with Raymonde Anghelopoulo)
- Salwa show 2 1985 (Tele Liban with Ferial Karim)
- Studio 86 1986 (Jordan TV)
- Women in the Independence 1994 (LBC)
- The Eyes of Christmas 1996 (Tele Liban)
- Jerash Festival 1987 (Jordanian Television with Abdo Yaghi & Alain Merheb )
- Byblos Festival 1987 1992–1998 (LBC)
- Sahrate Charqiah 1988 (LBC)
- Tyr Festival 1991 (Mashrek TV with Nadim Berberi)
- Special Evening 1993 (Tele Liban with Romeo Lahoud)
- Sahra Gheir Chikil 1993 (Tle Liban)
- Doyouf El Sabett 1985 (LBC with Simon Asmar)
- Al Leyl il maftouhh 1997 (Futur TV)
- Maestro 2005 (NTV with Aline Lahoud & Nichan)
- Sini aan sini 1997 (MTV with Hyam Abouchedid)
- Army Day 2001 (LBC with Maggy Aoun)

== Awards and distinctions ==
- Prix Said Akl (1976)
- Key of Alger (1984)
- Jerash Art Appreciation (1987)
- Award of Appreciation LA (1989)
- Scoop d'Or (1987)
- Gold Medal Independence (1991)
- Gold Eagle of Arab Song (1996)
- Gold Medal of the Army (2001)
- Murex d'Or (2005)
- Medaille d'or du merite libanais (2009)
- Murex d'or (2009)
- Award of Appreciation from Amsheet Municipality (2009)
- Award of Appreciation from Balamand University (2010)
- Award of Appreciation from Arts & Music Institute (2011)
- Award of Appreciation from Saint-Coeurs College (2011)
