= Fréro Delavega =

French musical duo

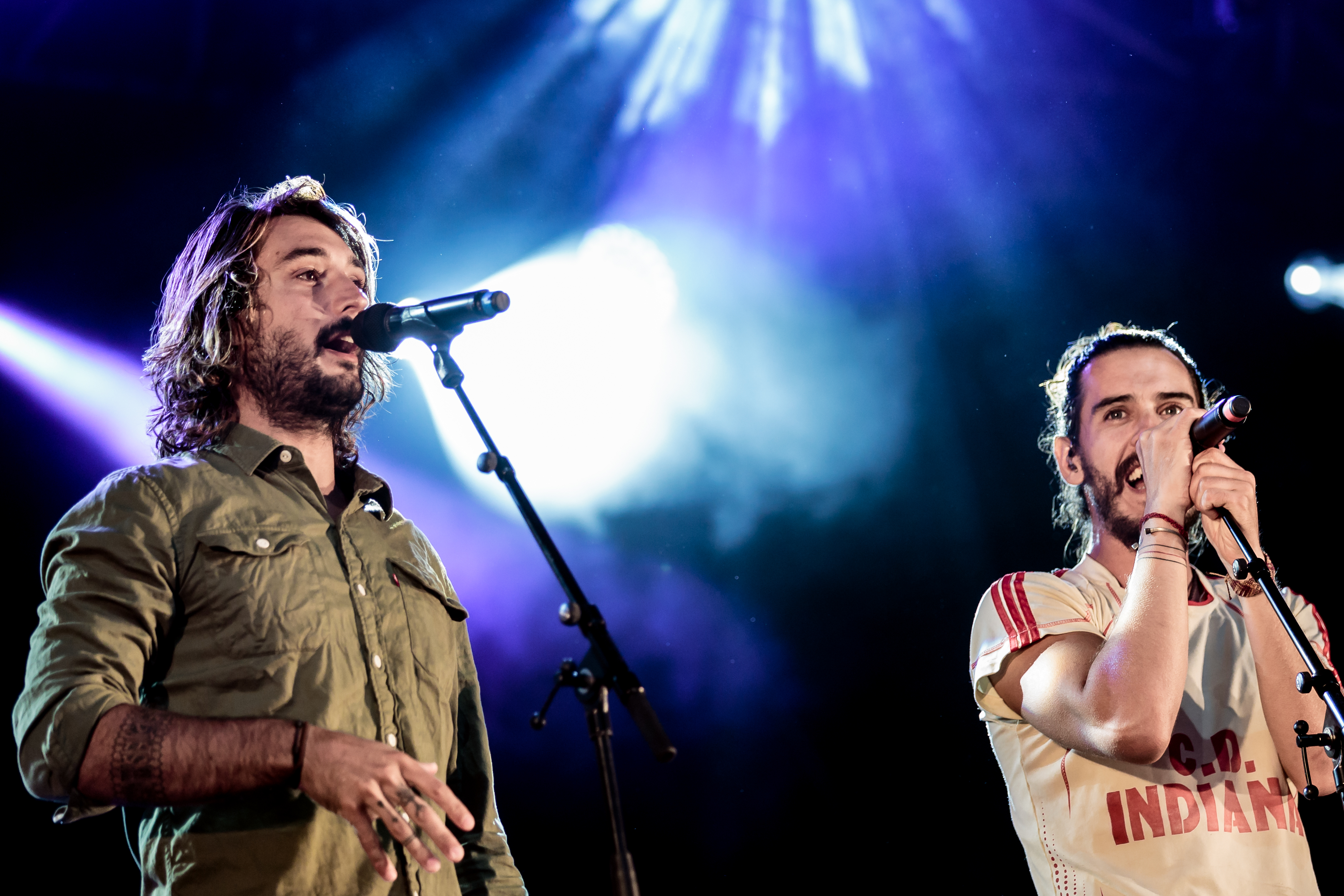
- Fréro Delavega in Brittany in 2016.

Background information
- Origin: France
- Genres: Pop-folk, Chanson
- Years active: 2011–2017
- Label: Capitol
- Members: Jérémy Frérot; Florian Delavega
- Website: frerodelavega.com

Fréro Delavega was a French musical duo made up of Jérémy Frérot and Florian "Flo" Delavega.

Frérot and Delavega took part in season 3 of the French musical competition series The Voice: la plus belle voix. After the competition, they formed a duo releasing a self-titled debut album Fréro Delavega premiering at number 1 in 2014. After break-up in 2017, both continue musical careers as solo artists.

== The Voice: la plus belle voix ==
Fréro Delavega participated in the blind auditions with a rendition of "Caroline" from MC Solaar broadcast on 1 February 2014 on TF1 with only judge Mika turning his chair. The remaining judges Florent Pagny, Jenifer and Garou refrained.

By default, Fréro Delavega were chosen to be part of Team Mika, progressing reaching the quarter-finals on 26 April 2014, before being eliminated.

Performances

- Audition (1 February 2014): "Caroline" by MC Solaar (only one judge Mika turned chair, in Team Mika by default)
- Musical Battle Round (15 March 2014): "Il y a" by Vanessa Paradis (Kept by coach, Quentin eliminated)
- L'épreuve ultime Round (29 March 2014): "P.I.M.P." by 50 Cent (Saved by coach alongside Kendji Girac. Cloé eliminated)
- Prime 2 Live (12 April 2014): "Sympathique (je ne veux pas travailler)" by Pink Martini (Élodie Martelet saved by public vote, with Fréro Delavega saved by coach and Marina D'Amico eliminated)
- Prime 3 Live (19 April 2013): "Let Her Go" by Passenger (Saved by public vote alongside Kendji Girac, Élodie Martelet saved by coach, Caroline Savoie eliminated)
- Prime 4 – Quarter-finals (26 April 2014): "Je m'voyais déjà" by Charles Aznavour (Eliminated)

== After The Voice ==
Fréro Delavega enjoyed popularity after participating in The Voice, with their official debut single "Sweet Darling" becoming a Top 20 hit in France. Their self-titled debut album Fréro Delavega premiered at number one on SNEP, the official French Albums Chart.

== Members ==
=== Florian Delavega ===
Florian Delavega
- Born: Florian Garcia; 12 June 1987 (age 39); Bordeaux, Gironde, Aquitaine, France
- Occupations: Singer; songwriter
- Years active: 2011–present

Florian Garcia, known as Florian "Flo" Delavega, was born 12 June 1987, in Bordeaux, Gironde.

He graduated with a Science and Techniques of Physical and Sporting Activities (in French Sciences et techniques des activités physiques et sportives (STAPS)) and after obtaining the degree became a physical education teacher at Collège Toulouse-Lautrec in Langon and also at Collège Jean-Zay in Bondy. He quit his positions to concentrate on a musical career.

Since 2011, he has partnered with the Argentine musician and singer Natalia Doco. In January 2018, the couple had their first child, a boy.

=== Jérémy Frérot ===
Jérémy Frérot
- Born: Jérémy Frérot; 17 March 1990 (age 36); Bruges, Gironde, Aquitaine, France
- Occupations: Singer; songwriter; guitarist
- Years active: 2011–present
- Website: www.jeremyfrerot.com

Jérémy Frérot (French pronunciation: [ʒeʁemi fʁeʁo]) was born in Bruges, Gironde, southwestern France on 17 March 1990. He started playing guitar at age of 17. He studied for a degree in Science and Techniques of Physical and Sporting Activities (in French Sciences et techniques des activités physiques et sportives (STAPS)). He was an avid sportsman practicing surfing, rugby and judo and studied to become a teacher in physical education. But he didn't complete his studies, preferring to concentrate his effort into music.

He was working as an education assistant at Collège la Grange aux Belles in Paris when he auditioned to The Voice: la plus belle voix, French version of The Voice.

In 2018, Frérot released his solo album Matriochka. Two singles were released from the album, "Revoir" and "Tu donnes". The album and both singles charted in France and Belgium. The album further reached number 12 in SNEP French Albums Chart and #29 in Belgium's francophone charts.

In 2020, Jérémy Frérot collaborated with the duo Madame Monsieur who featured him in their song "Comme un voleur".

In February 2021, he released his second album Meilleure vie.

He partnered with swimming athlete Laure Manaudou since 2015. The couple had a child in July 2017. Frérot had a boy, Lou, from a previous relation. Jérémy and Laure officially married on 12 May 2018.

== Discography ==
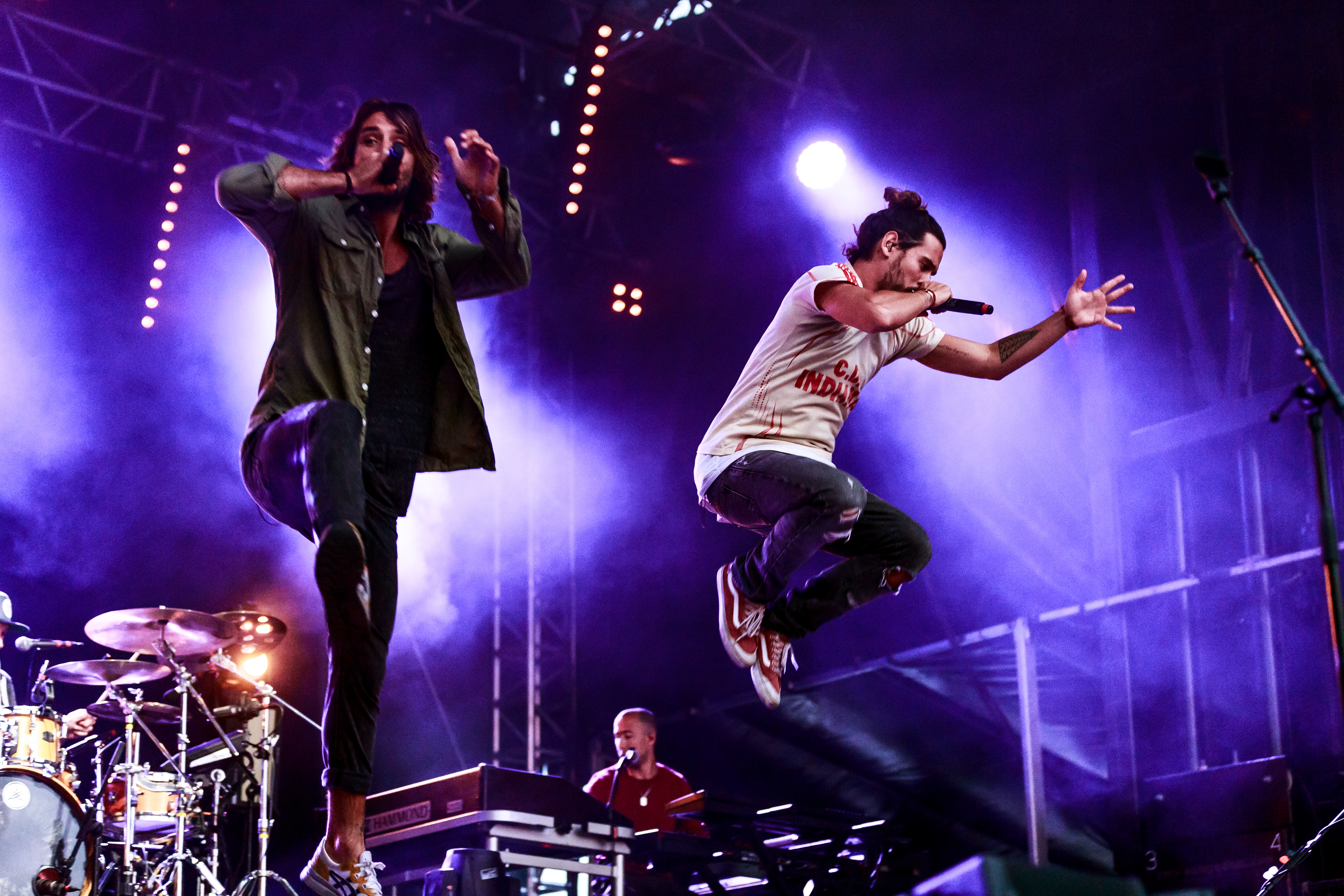
Fréro Delavega performing during Festival de Buguélès 2016.

=== Albums ===
Year	Album	Peak positions				Certification
Year	Album	FR	BEL (Fl)	BEL (Wa)	SWI	Certification
2014	Fréro Delavega	1	198	3	50	FR: Diamond
2015	Des ombres et des lumières	4	—	8	17	FR: 3× Platinum

Other releases

- 2014: Fréro Delavega (Deluxe Limited Edition)

=== EPs ===
- 2013: Onde sensuelle

=== Singles ===
Year	Single	Peak positions		Certification	Album
Year	Single	FR	BEL (Wa)	Certification	Album
2014	"Sweet Darling"	18	24		Fréro Delavega
2014	"Il y a"	30	–		Fréro Delavega
2014	"Le chant des sirènes"	9	14	FR: gold	Fréro Delavega
2014	"Caroline"	107	–		Fréro Delavega
2014	"Mon petit pays"	44	35		Fréro Delavega
2015	"Ton visage"	12	21		Des ombres et des lumières
2016	"Autour de moi"	61	13		Des ombres et des lumières
2016	"Le cœur éléphant"	42	10		Des ombres et des lumières
2016	"À l'équilibre"	–	40		Des ombres et des lumières

== Discography: Flo Delavega ==
=== Albums ===
Year	Title	Peak positions		
Year	Title	FR	BEL (Wa)	SWI
2020	Rêveur forêveur	35	43	75

=== Singles ===
Year	Title	Peak positions		Album
Year	Title	FR	BEL (Wa)	Album
2020	"Printemps éternel"	–	4* (Ultratip)	Rêveur forêveur

*Did not appear in the official Belgian Ultratop 50 charts, but rather in the bubbling under Ultratip charts.

== Discography: Jérémy Frérot ==
=== Albums ===
Year	Title	Peak positions		
Year	Title	FR	BEL (Wa)	SWI
2018	Matriochka	12	29	55
2021	Meilleure vie	29	—	—

=== Singles ===
Year	Title	Peak positions		Album
Year	Title	FR	BEL (Wa)	Album
2018	"Revoir"	89	11* (Ultratip)	Matriochka
2019	"Tu donnes"	139	3* (Ultratip)	Matriochka
2020	"Un homme"	86	–	Meilleur vie
2020	"Fais-le"	–	–	

*Did not appear in the official Belgian Ultratop 50 charts, but rather in the bubbling under Ultratip charts.

=== Featured in ===
Year	Title	Peak positions		Album
Year	Title	FR	BEL (Wa)	Album
2020	"Comme un voleur" (Madame Monsieur feat. Jérémy Frerot)	–	–	

=== Other songs ===
Year	Title	Peak positions		Album
Year	Title	FR	BEL (Wa)	Album
2019	"Avant le jour"	–	–	Matriochka
2019	"L'Homme nouveau"	–	–	Matriochka
