= Pascal Obispo discography =

This is the discography for French singer Pascal Obispo.

== Albums ==
=== Studio albums ===
Year	Album	Chart positions				Certification	Sales
Year	Album	FRA	BEL (Fl)	BEL (Wa)	SWI	Certification	Sales
1990	Le long du fleuve						
1992	Plus que tout au monde					FRA: 2× Gold	WW: 300,000
1994	Un jour comme aujourd'hui	17	—	27	—	FRA: Platinum	
1996	Superflu	2	—	2	47	FRA: Diamond; SWI: Gold	
1999	Soledad	2	—	4	38	FRA: 2× Platinum	WW: 700,000
2004	Studio Fan – Live Fan (2-CD set, one a studio album, the other live album)	1	—	1	9	FRA: Platinum	FRA: 400,000
2006	Les fleurs du bien	1	—	1	8		WW: 300,000
2009	Welcome to the Magic World of Captain Samourai Flower	2	—	1	52	FRA: Gold	
2011	Adam & Eve – La seconde chance (musical)	18	—	54	—		
2013	Millésimes	1	82	1	18	FRA: 2× Platinum	
2013	Le grand amour	3	130	2	25	FRA: 2× Platinum	
2016	Billet de femme	1	65	1	11	FRA: Gold	
2018	Obispo	3	87	2	10	FRA: Gold	
2021	France	2	—	2	—		
2023	Le beau qui pleut	4	—	4	16		
2024	L'archipel des séquelles	16	—	9	—		
2026	Héritage Vol. 2	19	—	5	—		

=== Live albums ===
Year	Album	Chart positions			Certification	Sales
Year	Album	FRA	BEL (Wa)	SWI	Certification	Sales
1998	Live 98	1	2	—	FRA: Platinum	
2001	Millésime / Live 00/01	2	1	28		WW: 500,000
2004	Live Fan (NB: Refer to studio albums section)	N/A	N/A	N/A	FRA: Platinum	
2007	Les Fleurs de forest	10	2	76		
2007	Millésimes – Live 2013–14	6	4	–		
2016	Billet de femme – Le concert symphonique	50	30	–	FRA: Gold	

== Singles ==
Year	Title	Chart positions			Album	Certifications	Sales
Year	Title	FRA	BEL (Wa)	SWI	Album	Certifications	Sales
1992	"Plus que tout au monde"	33	—	—	Plus que tout au monde		
1993	"Tu vas me manquer (les mains qui se cherchent)"	16	—	—	Plus que tout au monde		
1995	"Tombé pour elle"	12	37	—	Un jour comme aujourd'hui		
1996	"Tu compliques tout"	21	—	—	Un jour comme aujourd'hui		
1996	"Personne"	9	26	—	Superflu	FRA: Gold	
1997	"Il faut du temps"	40	—	—	Superflu		
1997	"Lucie"	6	14	—	Superflu	FRA: Gold	
1997	"Les meilleurs ennemis" (with Zazie)	39	20	—	Superflu		
1998	"Assassine"	18	14	—	Live 98		
1998	"Tombé pour elle (Live)"	80	40	—	Live 98		
2000	"L'important c'est d'aimer"	32	12	—	Soledad		
2001	"Pas besoin de regrets"	43	—	—	Soledad		
2001	"Ce qu'on voit, allée Rimbaud"	29	26	—	Soledad		
2002	"Millésime"	3	2	—	Millésime Live 00/01	FRA: Gold	
2002	"So Many Men" (with Youssou N'Dour)	35	27	85	Nothing's in Vain (Coono Du Réér)		
2003	"Fan"	1	1	15	Studio Fan – Live Fan	BEL: Gold; FRA: Gold	FRA: 300,000
2003	"Zinedine"	8	4	53	Studio Fan – Live Fan	FRA: Gold	
2004	"Mourir demain" (with Natasha St-Pier)	7	4	18	L'Instant d'après		
2004	"Y'a pas un homme qui soit né pour ça" (with Florent Pagny & Calogero)	20	—	45			
2006	"1980" (with Melissa Mars)	5	3	43	Les Fleurs du bien		
2007	"Les fleurs du bien"	18	32	—	Les Fleurs du bien		
2007	"Nouveau voyage (C'est la vie)" (feat. Baby Bash)	—	10	—	Les Fleurs de Forest		
2009	"Le drapeau"	6	7	—	Welcome to the Magic World of Captain Samouraï Flower		
2009	"Idéaliste"	—	18	—	Welcome to the Magic World of Captain Samouraï Flower		
2010	La valse des regrets"	—	—	—	Welcome to the Magic World of Captain Samouraï Flower		
2012	"Tu m'avais dit"	62	30	—	MillésimeS		
2013	"Millésime" (rerelease)	79	—	—	MillésimeS		
2013	"D'un Avé Maria"	33	28	—	Le Grand Amour		
2013	"Le Grand Amour"	175	—	—	Le Grand Amour		
2014	"Arigatô"	134	—	—	Le Grand Amour		
2014	"Où et avec qui tu m'aimes"	78	—	—	Le Grand Amour		
2015	"Le secret perdu"	93	—	—	Billet de femme		
2016	"Je ne sais plus, je ne veux plus"	198	—	—	Billet de femme		
2016	"Je laisse le temps faire"	198	—	—	Billet de femme – Le concert symphonique		
2018	"Chante la rue chante"	—	24	—	TBA		
2019	"Rien ne dure"	—	32	—	TBA		
"—" denotes releases that did not chart or were not released in that country.
