= Zest Of =

Greatest hits album by Zazie
- Released: 17 November 2008
- Recorded: 1992–2008
- Genre: Pop
- Length: 150:43
- Label: Mercury, Universal Music

Zazie chronology
| Totem (2007) | Zest Of (2008) | Za7ie (2010) |

Singles from Zest Of
- 1. "FM Air" Released: 2008

Zest Of is a 2008 album recorded by French pop singer Zazie. It was her first best of and her tenth album overall. It was released on 17 November 2008 digitally and under physical formats and achieved success in francophone countries. It provided a sole single, "FM Air" (a pun in French-language with "éphémère"), which was #8 in France and #19 in Belgium (Wallonia).

== Description and chart performance ==
It contains 36 songs from Zazie's six studio albums, Je, tu, ils, Zen, Made in Love, La Zizanie, Rodéo and Totem. It includes in live a song from Made in Live and four others from the singer's later tour, Totem Tour, plus the duets with Axel Bauer and Pascal Obispo which didn't appear on Zazie's studio albums.

It also contains two new songs, "FM Air", available in six versions released on collector-edition vinyl (limited edition) and the song "Un peu beaucoup".

The best-of was available in two versions : standard editions (two CD), and the collector edition (2 CD + DVD, in a set box).

The album went straight to number-one in France (compilations chart) and remained at this position for seven weeks. It also debuted atop in Belgium and remained for 14 weeks in the top ten. It was much less successful in Switzerland, staying for only nine weeks on the chart.

== Track listings ==
=== CD 1 ===
| Title | Length | From album |
|---|---|---|
| "FM Air" | 3:27 | Zest Of |
| "Je suis un homme" | 4:08 | Totem |
| "Des rails" | 3:04 | Totem |
| "Duo" (duet with Paolo Nutini) | 3:10 | Totem |
| "Flower Power" | 2:51 | Totem |
| "Ça" | 3:16 | Totem |
| "J'étais là" (2007 live, duet with Diam's) | 3:36 | Totem |
| "Rodéo" | 3:31 | Rodéo |
| "Toc toc toc" | 3:28 | Rodéo |
| "La dolce vita" | 4:32 | Rodéo |
| "Un peu beaucoup" | 2:55 | Zest Of |
| "J'arrive" | 4:32 | Rodéo |
| "Oui" (2007 live) | 5:05 | Rodéo |
| "On éteint" (2007 live) | 4:43 | La Zizanie |
| "Aux armes citoyennes" | 4:41 | La Zizanie |
| "Adam & Yves" | 4:38 | La Zizanie |
| "Si j'étais moi" (2007 live) | 5:55 | La Zizanie |
| "Rue de la paix" | 4:16 | La Zizanie |
| "Sur toi" | 4:06 | La Zizanie |

=== CD 2 ===
| Title | Length | From album |
|---|---|---|
| "À ma place" (with Axel Bauer) | 5:49 | Personne n'est parfait |
| "Chanson d'ami" | 4:33 | Made in Love |
| "Tout le monde" (replicant remix) | 4:46 | Made in Love |
| "La preuve par trois" | 5:29 | Made in Love |
| "Cyber" (live Tour des Anges) | 4:24 | "Made in Live" |
| "Tous des anges" | 5:17 | Made in Love |
| "Ça fait mal et ça fait rien" | 4:27 | Made in Love |
| "Les meilleurs ennemis" (duet with Pascal Obispo) | 3:31 | Superflu |
| "J'envoie valser" | 3:28 | Zen |
| "Au diable nos adieux" | 4:38 | Zen |
| "Zen" | 3:53 | Zen |
| "Un point c'est toi" (new version) | 4:31 | Zen |
| "Larsen" | 4:36 | Zen |
| "Homme sweet homme" remix | 3:54 | Zen |
| "Je tue ils" | 3:48 | Je, tu, ils |
| "Sucré salé" | 3:32 | Je, tu, ils |
| "Snowball" | 4:10 | Je, tu, ils |

=== DVD (collector edition) ===
| Title | From album | Producer |
|---|---|---|
| "FM Air" | Zest Of | Julien Reymond |
| "J'étais là" | Totem | Denis Thybaud |
| "Je suis un homme" | Totem | Yvan Attal |
| "Des rails" | Totem | Gilles Porte |
| "La pluie et le beau temps" | Rodéo | Didier Le Pêcheur |
| "Doolididom" | Rodéo | Didier Le Pêcheur |
| "Excuse-moi" | Rodéo | Didier Le Pêcheur |
| "La dolce vita" | Rodéo | Didier Le Pêcheur |
| "Toc toc toc" | Rodéo | Didier Le Pêcheur |
| "Lola majeure" | Rodéo | Didier Le Pêcheur |
| "Slow" | Rodéo | Didier Le Pêcheur |
| "Rodéo" | Rodéo | Didier Le Pêcheur |
| "J'arrive" | Rodéo | Didier Le Pêcheur |
| "Oui" | Rodéo | Didier Le Pêcheur |
| "Danse avec les loops" | La Zizanie | Julien Trousselier |
| "Sur toi" | La Zizanie | Spe6men |
| "Adam & Yves" | La Zizanie | Mathieu Salliva |
| "Rue de la paix" | La Zizanie | Spe6men |
| "À ma place" | Personne n'est parfait | Didier Le Pêcheur |
| "Cyber" | Made in Love | Gilbert Namiand |
| "Chanson d'ami" | Made in Love | Didier Le Pêcheur |
| "Tout le monde" | Made in Love | Jean-Baptiste Mondino |
| "Ça fait mal et ça fait rien" | Made in Love | Didier Le Pêcheur |
| "Tous des anges" | Made in Love | Philippe André |
| "Les meilleurs ennemis" | Superflu | Didier Le Pêcheur |
| "Homme sweet homme" | Zen | Didier Le Pêcheur |
| "Un point c'est toi" | Zen | Didier Le Pêcheur |
| "Zen" | Zen | Philippe André |
| "Larsen" | Zen | Philippe André |
| "Un petit peu amoureux" | Je, tu, ils | Philippe Gautier |
| "Je tue ils" | Je, tu, ils | Philippe Gautier |
| "Sucré salé" | Je, tu, ils | Pascal d'Hoeraene |

== Charts and sales ==
=== Weekly charts ===
| Chart (2008) | Peak position |
|---|---|
| Belgian (Wallonia) Albums Chart | 1 |
| French SNEP Digital Chart | 9 |
| French SNEP Compilations Chart | 1 |
| Swiss Albums Chart | 39 |

=== Year-end charts ===
| Chart (2008) | Position |
|---|---|
| Belgian (Wallonia) Albums Chart | 52 |
| French Compilations Chart | 1 |
| Chart (2009) | Position |
| Belgian (Wallonia) Albums Chart | 6 |

== Certifications and sales ==
| Region | Certification | Certified units/sales |
|---|---|---|
| Belgium (BRMA) | Gold | 15,000^{*} |
^{*} Sales figures based on certification alone.
