= Millésimes =

Compilation album by Pascal Obispo
- Released: 7 January 2013
- Label: Jive Records (Sony)

Millésimes (stylized as MillésimeS) is a compilation album by Pascal Obispo, released on 7 January 2013. It contains 35 tracks and 5 live tracks. The album also includes a large number of collaborations with other artists including Luz Casal, Natasha St-Pier, Youssou N'Dour, Melissa Mars, Florent Pagny, Calogero and Johnny Hallyday.

== Track listing ==
=== 2-CD standard edition ===
Disc one

1. "Plus que tout au monde" (4:14)
2. "Tu vas me manquer" (3:47)
3. "Où est l'élue" (4:55)
4. "Tombé pour elle" (4:07)
5. "Tu compliques tout" (4:18)
6. "Personne" (4:20)
7. "Il faut du temps" (4:25)
8. "Lucie" (4:15)
9. "Où et avec qui tu m'aimes" (3:41)
10. "L'important c'est d'aimer" (4:26)
11. "Pas besoin de regrets" (4:31)
12. "Ce qu'on voit... Allée Rimbaud" (3:50)
13. "Millésime" (3:49)
14. "Fan" (4:26)
15. "La prétention de rien" (3:56)
16. "Rosa" (4:18)
17. "Les fleurs du bien" (4:20)
18. "Le chanteur idéal" (3:23)

Disc two

1. "Tu m'avais dit" (3:09)
2. "Comment veux tu que je t'aime?" (4:08)
3. "Le Drapeau" (3:56)
4. "Idéaliste" (Captain Samouraï Flower) (3:20)
5. "Si je manquais de ta peau" (4:40)
6. "Les Meilleurs Ennemis" (with participation of Zazie) (4:21)
7. "Soledad" (feat. Luz Casal) (4:25)
8. "Mourir demain" (feat. Natasha St-Pier) (4:08)
9. "So Many Men" (with Youssou N'Dour) (3:57)
10. "1980" (feat Melissa Mars) (4:02)
11. "Y'a pas un homme qui soit né pour ça" (feat. Florent Pagny & Calogero) (4:16)
12. "Nouveau voyage" (feat. Baby Bash) (3:41)
13. "Assassine" (live) (6:32)
14. "Sa raison d'être" (live) (4:34)
15. "Et un jour, une femme" (live) (feat. Florent Pagny) (5:05)
16. "Allumer le feu" (live) (feat. Johnny Hallyday) (6:13)
17. "L'Envie d'aimer" (live) (6:31)

=== 3-CD deluxe edition ===
Disc one

1. "Plus que tout au monde" (4:14)
2. "Tu vas me manquer" (3:47)
3. "Où est l'élue" (4:55)
4. "Tombé pour elle" (4:07)
5. "Tu compliques tout" (4:18)
6. "Personne" (4:20)
7. "Il faut du temps" (4:25)
8. "Lucie" (4:15)
9. "Où et avec qui tu m'aimes" (3:41)
10. "L'important c'est d'aimer" (4:26)
11. "Pas besoin de regrets" (4:31)
12. "Ce qu'on voit... Allée Rimbaud" (3:50)
13. "Millésime" (3:49)
14. "Fan" (4:26)
15. "La prétention de rien" (3:56)
16. "Rosa" (4:18)
17. "Les fleurs du bien" (4:20)
18. "Le chanteur idéal" (3:23)

Disc two

1. "Le Drapeau" (3:56)
2. "Idéaliste" (Captain Samouraï Flower) (3:20)
3. "Si je manquais de ta peau" (4:40)
4. "Les Meilleurs Ennemis" (with participation of Zazie) (4:21)
5. "Soledad" (feat. Luz Casal) (4:25)
6. "Mourir demain" (feat. Natasha St-Pier) (4:08)
7. "So Many Men" (with Youssou N'Dour) (3:57)
8. "1980" (feat Melissa Mars) (4:02)
9. "Y'a pas un homme qui soit né pour ça" (feat. Florent Pagny & Calogero) (4:16)
10. "Nouveau voyage" (feat. Baby Bash) (3:41)
11. "Je laisse le temps faire" (3:29)
12. "Assassine" (live) (6:32)
13. "Sa raison d'être" (live) (4:34)
14. "Et un jour, une femme" (live) (feat. Florent Pagny) (5:05)
15. "Allumer le feu" (live) (feat. Johnny Hallyday) (6:13)
16. "L'Envie d'aimer" (live) (6:31)

Disc three

1. "Tu m'avais dit" (3:09)
2. "Comment veux tu que je t'aime?" (4:08)
3. "Savoir aimer [piano cordes]" (4:29)
4. "Y'a un ange" (5:59)
5. "Des p'tits trucs cons" (3:25)
6. "Qu'on ne me parle plus de toi duo Virginie Ledoyen [ECS]" (4:56)
7. "Si maman si" (3:51)
8. "Palais Royal" (3:33)
9. "Faut pas rêver" (4:01)
10. "Les mots bleus [duet with Christophe]" (5:57)
11. "Ailleurs land [demo]" (5:01)
12. "Où est l'élue [duet with Zazie] [demo]" (4:55)
13. "Tu trouveras [demo]" (4:22)
14. "Ma liberté de penser [demo]" (3:28)
15. "Rien ne se finit [demo]" (3:59)
16. "Ma bataille [demo]" (4:02)

== Charts ==
It debuted at No. 2 on the French Albums Chart and reached No. 1 in its second week. It also reached number 1 in Ultratop 50, the French Belgian Wallonia Albums Chart.

=== Weekly charts ===
Chart (2013)	Peak position
Belgian Albums (Ultratop Flanders)	82
Belgian Albums (Ultratop Wallonia)	1
French Albums (SNEP)	1
Swiss Albums (Schweizer Hitparade)	18

=== Year-end charts ===
Chart (2013)	Position
Belgian Albums (Ultratop Wallonia)	6
French Albums (SNEP)	19
Chart (2014)	Position
Belgian Albums (Ultratop Wallonia)	138
