= Je suis un homme =

Single by Zazie

from the album Totem
- B-side: "Music video"
- Released: October 2007
- Recorded: 2006
- Genre: Pop; rock
- Length: 3:48 (radio edit); 4:11 (album version)
- Label: Mercury; Universal Music
- Songwriters: Zazie; Jean-Pierre Pilot; Philippe Paradis
- Producers: Zazie; Jean-Pierre Pilot; Philippe Paradis

Zazie singles chronology
"Des rails" (2006)	"Je suis un homme" (2007)	"J'étais là" (2007)

"Je suis un homme" is a 2007 pop song recorded by French singer Zazie. It was the second single from her sixth studio album Totem and was released in early October 2007. It was the singer's most successful solo single, being a top-ten hit in France and Belgium (Wallonia).

== Lyrics and music video ==
Written and composed by Zazie, alongside Philippe Paradis and Jean-Pierre Pilot, the song deals in a critical and pessimistic way with human behavior towards environmental issues and consumer society. On 17 April 2007, Zazie herself announced in the media that "Je suis un homme would be the second single off the Totem album. The music video was directed by Yvan Attal and the shooting was made at the Mac / Val, the Musée d'art contemporain of Vitry-sur-Seine. It shows the singer as a naked pregnant woman at an exhibition about the humanity. The woman is worried about various problems presented, including population explosion, forest devastated, deaths by malnutrition, CO_{2} emissions... The song, as well as the music video, are available on Zazie's greatest hits compilation Zest of.

== Chart performances and awards ==
In France, the single entered the SNEP chart on 6 October 2007 at a peak of seven, becoming Zazie's second top ten hit, after her duet with Axel Bauer, "À ma place". It then dropped slowly and remained for a total 22 weeks in the top 50 and 29 weeks in the top 100. In Belgium (Wallonia), it debuted at the bottom of the chart, and reached a peak of number seven, 16 weeks later. It remained in the top 40 for 28 weeks.

The song was nominated at the 2008 Victoires de la Musique in the category 'Original song of the year', but did not win.

== Cover versions ==
The song was included in a medley named "medley double" and recorded by Gérard Darmon and Lorie for the 2007 album La Caravane des Enfoirés. "Je suis un homme" was performed live by Amandine Bourgeois and Ycare on 28 May 2008, in French television show Nouvelle Star. In 2010, Les Enfoirés recorded a cover of the song for their album La Crise de nerfs!; the singers on this version are Pascal Obispo, Jean-Jacques Goldman, Claire Keim and Bénabar.

== Track listings ==
- CD single

No.	Title	Length
1.	"Je suis un homme"	4:11
2.	"Je suis un homme" (music video)	3:46

- CD single – Promo

No.	Title	Length
1.	"Je suis un homme" (radio edit)	3:48

- Digital download

No.	Title	Length
1.	"Je suis un homme" (album version)	4:09

== Charts ==
=== Weekly charts ===
Chart (2007–08)	Peak position
Belgian (Wallonia) Singles Chart	7
Eurochart Hot 100	25
French SNEP Singles Chart	7
French SNEP Digital Chart	5

=== Year-end charts ===
Chart (2007)	Position
Belgian (Wallonia) Singles Chart	27
French Airplay Chart	72
French Singles Chart	74
French Digital Chart	17
