= Rodéo =

Rodéo may refer to:

- Rodéo (riot), rioting-related body of strategy and tactics
- Titled works:
  - Rodéo (Lucky Luke), 1949 in the Lucky Luke series
  - Rodéo (Zazie album), 2004 music album by singer-songwriter Zazie

== See also ==
- Rodeo, primarily North-American and Australian sport
- Rodeo (disambiguation)
