= Rodeo (disambiguation) =

Rodeo is a traditional North American sport.

Rodeo may also refer to:

== Competitions ==
- Air Mobility Rodeo, an international airlift competition
- Charreada, Mexican rodeo, the national sport of Mexico
- Chilean rodeo, the national sport of Chile
- Playboating or Freestyle Kayaking (formerly "Rodeo"), a form of whitewater paddling

== Places ==
- Argentina:
  - Rodeo, San Juan
- Mexico:
  - Rodeo, Durango
  - Rodeo Municipality
- Los Rodeos, airport in Tenerife, Spain; now called Tenerife North Airport
- United States:
  - Rodeo Drive, Beverly Hills, California, United States
  - Communities:
    - Rodeo, California
    - Rodeo, New Mexico

== Arts, entertainment, and media ==
=== Music ===
- Rodeo (Travis Scott album), a 2015 album by Travis Scott
- Rodéo (Zazie album), a 2004 album by Zazie
- "Rodeo" (Garth Brooks song), 1991
- "Rodeo" (Juvenile song), 2006
- "Rodeo" (Lil Nas X and Cardi B song), 2019
- "Rodeo" (Blanka song), 2023
- "Rodeo", a 2016 single by Chancellor

=== Other uses in arts, entertainment, and media ===
- Rodeo (ballet), a ballet choreographed by Agnes de Mille and scored by Aaron Copland
- Rodeo: Four Dance Episodes, a ballet choreographed by Justin Peck to music by Aaron Copland
- Rodeo, a bull villager from the video game series Animal Crossing
- Rodeo (1952 film), a 1952 film directed by William Beaudine
- Rodeo (2022 Canadian film), a film directed by Joëlle Desjardins Paquette
- Rodeo (2022 French film), a film directed by Lola Quivoron
- Rodéo (Lucky Luke), a Lucky Luke book
- "Rodeo", a 1977 episode of The Bionic Woman
- A Rodeo Film, 2019 film directed by Darius Dawson

== Vehicles ==
- Holden Rodeo, a pick-up truck
- Isuzu Rodeo, a midsize sport utility vehicle
- Renault Rodeo, a series of open cars produced by ACL

== Other uses ==
- Rodéo (riot), a technique of rioting
- Rodeo, a RAF World War II code name for fighter sweeps over enemy territory
- Rodeo, a Dow Chemical Company herbicide containing glyphosate

== See also ==
- El Rodeo (disambiguation)
- Rodeio
