= Daniel Lévi =

French singer-songwriter (1961–2022)

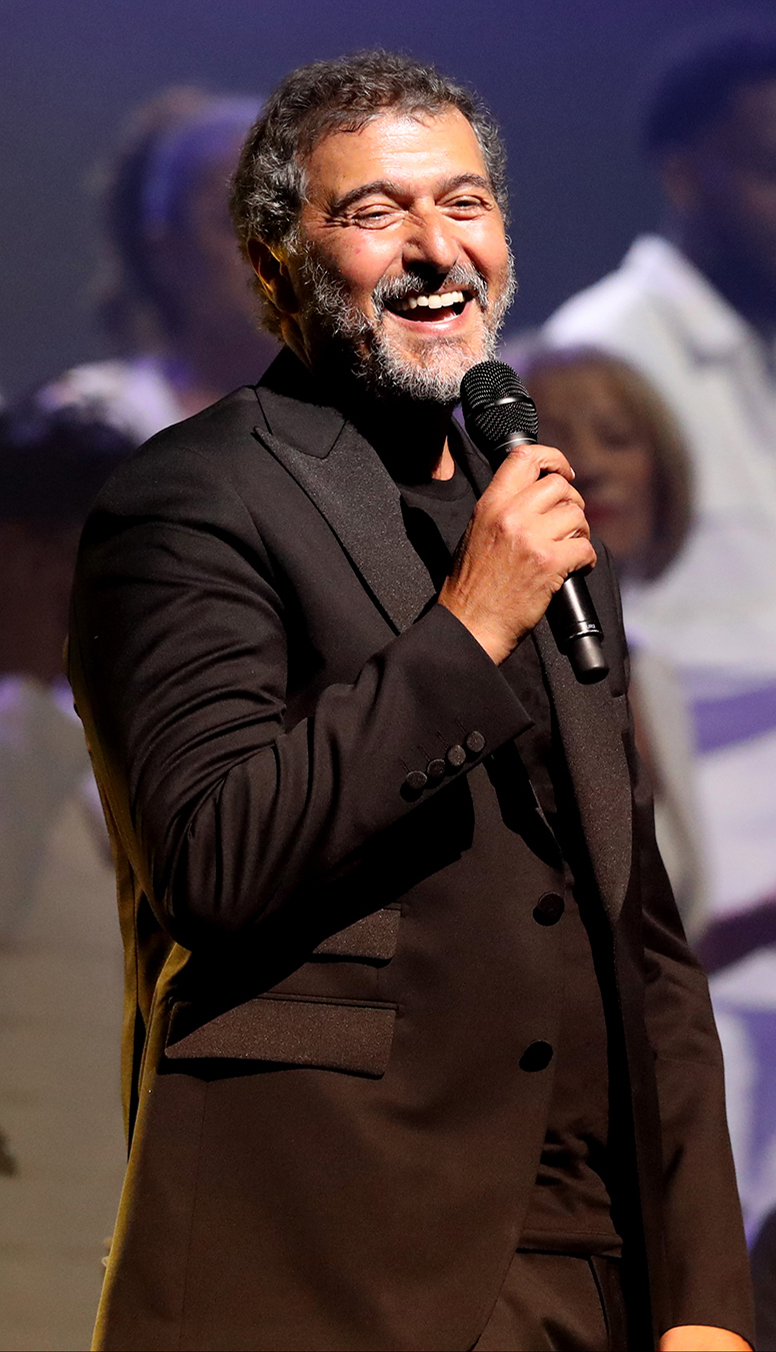
- Lévi in 2019

Background information
- Born: 26 August 1961; Constantine, French Algeria
- Died: 6 August 2022 (aged 60) Marseille, Bouches-du-Rhône, France
- Genres: Pop
- Occupations: Singer, songwriter, composer
- Years active: 1983–2022
- Website: daniellevi.artistes.universalmusic.fr

Daniel Lévi (26 August 1961 – 6 August 2022) was a French singer-songwriter, composer, and pianist.

== Biography ==
He spent his childhood in Lyon, where he was preparing for his job as a musician studying piano for a decade at the conservatory in the city. In 1983, he composed and recorded his first album entitled Cocktail. In 1991, he took part in the musical produced by Catherine Lara Sand et les Romantiques, on the stage of the Chatelet in which he portrayed Alfred de Musset and Frédéric Chopin. In 1993, he was hired by Disney Studios to record a duet with Karine Costa, the song of the animated feature Aladdin : "Ce Rêve bleu". In 1996, AB studios opened their doors to record his second album Entre parenthèses which was entirely composed by him. Then in 2000, he played the role of Moses in Élie Chouraqui and Pascal Obispo's musical Les Dix Commandements. He had huge success with the hit single "L'Envie d'aimer". After the triumph of the musical, Lévi decided to begin again to compose. In October 2002, he released his third album entitled Ici et Maintenant. In January 2005, his fourth album Le Cœur ouvert was produced in collaboration with Pascal Obispo.

== Discography ==
=== Albums ===
Year	Title	Chart		Certification (FR)
Year	Title	FR	BEL (WA)	Certification (FR)
1983	Cocktail	—	—	—
1996	Entre parenthèses	—	—	—
2002	Ici et Maintenant	34	47	—
2005	Le cœur ouvert	51	71	—

=== Compilation albums ===
- 2017: Daniel Lévi
- 2019: 50 et quelques (Best of)
- 2021: Grâce à toi

=== Singles ===
Year	Title	Chart			Certification (FR)
Year	Title	FR	BEL (WA)	SWI	Certification (FR)
1993	"Ce rêve bleu" (with Karine Costa)	3	—	—	Silver
2000	"L'envie d'aimer"	2	2	20	Diamond
2001	"Mon frère" (with Ahmed Mouici)	41	8 (Ultratip)	—	—
2002	"Ici et maintenant"	41	38	—	—

Songs

- 1984: "Fou de toi"
- 1985: "Belle africaine"
- 1985: 'Falaise bleue"
- 1986: "L'amour au cœur"
- 1992: "Aime moi comme ton enfant" (with Catherine Lara)
- 1992: "Ce reve bleu" (with Karine Costa)
- 1996: "Change rien"
- 1997: "Elle est soleil"
- 2000: "L'envie d'aimer"
- 2001: "Mon frère" (with Ahmed Mouici)
- 2002: "Ici et maintenant"
- 2003: "L'enfant"
- 2004: "L'amour qu'il faut"
- 2005: "La peine de vivre"
- 2005: "Je meurs d'envie de Vous"
- 2017: "Un jour se lève"
- 2018: "Les Yeux De Mon Enfance" (en duo avec Nicolas Reyes)
- 2018: "Ce Soir"
- 2019: "Libre Sur Sa Terre"
- 2019: "Comme Un Homme"
- 2020: "Si On Peut"
- 2020: "Toi, Moi, Nous, Eux, Lui, Vous"
- 2020: "Les Gens Bien"

== Appearances ==
- 1991: Sand et les Romantiques – in role of Chopin and Musset
- 1993: Aladdin of Disney – "Ce rêve bleu" (with Karine Costa) rom soundtrack of film
- 2000: Les Dix Commandements – in role of Moses
- 2001: L'Odyssée des Enfoirés
- 2001: Feelings : Hommage à Loulou Gasté

== DVDs ==
- 2001: Les Dix Commandements
- 2001: L'Odyssée des Enfoirés
- 2013: Daniel Lévi, Live in Neguev
- 2013: Daniel Lévi, Live Casino de Paris
