= L'envie d'aimer =

2000 single by Daniel Lévi

Single by Daniel Lévi

from the album Les Dix Commandements
- B-side: "Mais tu t'en vas"
- Released: 7 June 2000
- Recorded: 2000
- Genre: Pop
- Length: 5:10 (single version); 6:28 (album version)
- Label: Mercury, Universal Music
- Songwriters: Lionel Florence; Patrice Guirao; Pascal Obispo
- Producers: Pascal Obispo; Pierre Jaconelli

Daniel Lévi singles chronology
| "Ce rêve bleu" (1993) | "L'envie d'aimer" (2000) | "Mon frère" (2003) |

"L'envie d'aimer" is a 2000 song recorded by French-born singer Daniel Lévi and the troupe of The Ten Commandments. Released as first single from the album Les Dix Commandements in June 2000, the song was a smash hit and the most successful single from the musical. The song is currently among the biggest selling singles of all time in France.

== Background and structure ==
The album version of the song is extended (6:28) and contains many choirs from the troupe. Written and composed by Pascal Obispo, Lionel Florence, who had already several number-one hits in France such as "Savoir aimer" and "Tu ne m'as pas laissé le temps", Patrice Guirao, who had written for Art Mengo, the song was very moving. An expert of French charts made this analysis of the song : "With the text of the verses, spaced out and almost minimal, [Lévi] murmurs, he speaks in a low voice, he sings hardly, a moderation which the sweetness of wind instruments blows him. And it is not due to a lack of voice : this one, disturbing of power and color, asks only to spread and the vowels of the tune are there for this."

== Chart performances and awards ==
In France, the single failed to reach #1, but went straight to #2 on 10 June 2002 and stayed there for six weeks, being unable to dislodge Yannick's hit "Ces Soirées-là". The song remained for 30 weeks in the top ten and 51 weeks on the chart (top 100), which is to date one of the records in terms of chart trajectory. In Belgium (Wallonia), the song peaked at #2 for six weeks and fell off the chart (top 40) after 36 weeks, 25 of them in the top ten.

In 2001, the song was awarded 'Original song of the year' at the Victoires de la Musique.

== Cover versions ==
The song was covered by Éric Morena in 2003 on the album Retour gagnant which was composed of cover versions by famous 1980s artists. The same year, the song was covered by Julien Clerc, Patrick Fiori, Catherine Lara and Liane Foly on Les Enfoirés' album La Foire des Enfoirés. In 2002, Céline Dion released a version in English under the title "The Greatest Reward" on her album A New Day Has Come. In 2006, the song was used as soundtrack of the 2006 film Comme t'y es belle !. In 2007, Greek French television presenter Nikos Aliagas recorded a Greek version of the song with Elena Paparizou, for his Greek duet album titled Rendez-Vous. The track was released as a single, accompanied by a music video. In 2013, Pascal Obispo covered the song on his best of Millésimes.

== Track listings ==
CD single

1. "L'envie d'aimer" — 5:10
2. "Mais tu t'en vas" by Nourith, Lisbet Guldbaek, Ginie Line, Yaël — 5:34

== Charts and sales ==
=== Peak positions ===
| Chart (2000) | Peak position |
|---|---|
| Belgian (Wallonia) Singles Chart | 2 |
| French SNEP Singles Chart | 2 |
| Swiss Singles Chart | 20 |

=== Year-end charts ===
| Chart (2000) | Position |
|---|---|
| Belgian (Wallonia) Singles Chart | 3 |
| French Singles Chart | 4 |
| Chart (2001) | Position |
| French Singles Chart | 77 |

=== Certifications and sales ===
Certifications for "L'envie d'aimer"
| Region | Certification | Certified units/sales |
|---|---|---|
| France (SNEP) | Diamond | 750,000^{*} |
^{*} Sales figures based on certification alone.
