= El Rodeo =

El Rodeo may refer to:

- El Rodeo, Escuintla, Guatemala
- El Rodeo, San Marcos, Guatemala
- El Rodeo de San Antonio, Michoácan, Mexico
- El Rodeo (Mexico City Metrobús), a BRT station in Mexico City

== See also ==
- Rodeo (disambiguation)
