= Zen (Zazie album) =

Studio album by Zazie
- Released: 7 January 1995
- Recorded: 1994
- Genre: Pop
- Length: 45:42
- Label: Polygram; Universal Music
- Producer: Vincent-Marie Bouvot

Zazie chronology
Je, Tu, Ils (1993)	Zen (1995)	Made in Love (1998)

Singles from Zen
- 1. "Larsen" Released: 1994; 2. "Zen" Released: 1995; 3. "Un point c'est toi" Released: 1995; 4. "Homme sweet homme" Released: 1997

Professional ratings
Review scores
Source	Rating
AllMusic	3/5 stars

Zen is a 1995 album recorded by French pop singer Zazie. It was her second studio album and was released on 7 January 1995. The album achieved success in francophone countries and provided five singles (two of them were only released as promotional singles): "Larsen" (#38 in France), "Zen" (#23 in France) and "Un point c'est toi" (#24 in France).

== Recording ==
The vast majority of the lyrics and the music of the album were written and composed by Zazie. However, Pascal Obispo, Phil Baron and Vincent-Marie Bouvot also participated in this album.

"Zen" was recorded in a cellar named Unrealworld Studios, as reference to Realworld Studios of Peter Gabriel where he had recorded his first album. This album was supported by a 42-concert tours throughout France, including three shows at La Cigale in Paris.

The music video for "Larsen" was produced by Phillippe André and won the prize of 'best music video' at the 1996 Victoires de la Musique. And for the song "Je t'aime mais", it was a tribute to Serge Gainsbourg.

== Track listings ==
All lyrics are written by Zazie, except "Homme sweet homme (Remix)" by Vincent-Marie Bouvot & Zazie.

Zen – Standard edition
No.	Title	Music	Length
1.	"Fou de toi"	Vincent-Marie Bouvot; Zazie	3:19
2.	"Homme sweet homme"	Zazie	3:36
3.	"Larsen"	Bouvot; Zazie	4:21
4.	"Un point c'est toi"	Bouvot; Zazie	3:32
5.	"Je t'aime mais"	Zazie	4:18
6.	"Zen"	Pascal Obispo	3:53
7.	"Craque monsieur"	Bouvot	3:45
8.	"Au diable nos adieux"	Bouvot; Zazie	4:37
9.	"Hissée haut"	Zazie	3:50
10.	"Une souris verte"	Zazie	3:40
11.	"J'envoie valser"	Phil Baron	2:51
12.	"La la la"	Zazie	4:00
Total length:			45:42

Zen – 1996 reedition
No.	Title	Music	Length
13.	"Homme sweet homme" (Remix) (Includes "Les moutons...", hidden track starts at 4:12)	Bouvot; Zazie	13:41
Total length:			59:23

== Credits and personnel ==
Musician

- Accordion : Phil Baron
- Acoustic guitar, background vocals : Pascal Obispo
- Bass : Nicolas Fiszman, Laurent Gueneau and Pierre Jaconelli
- Clavichord : Vic Emerson, Vincent-Marie Bouvot and Zazie
- Cristal bachet : Thomas Bloch
- Djembe, flûte de pong : Nicolas Fiszman
- Drums : Nicolas Ackermann and Yvan Ackermann
- Electric guitar : Laurent Gueneau and Pierre Jaconelli
- Guitar : Michael Ohayon, Nicolas Fiszman, Stéphane Reichart, Kamil Rustam, Laurent Gueneau, Pierre Jaconelli and Vincent-Marie Bouvot
- Multi instruments : Steve Shehan
- Organ (hammond) : Jean Mora
- Organ, piano : Zazie
- Percussion, scratching : Dee Nasty
- Udu [shakoeuf] Yvan Ackermann
- Uilleann pipes : Marc Pollier
- Strings : Vincent-Marie Bouvot

Recording and photo

- Mixing : Nick Davis, Zazie, Phil Delire and Vincent-Marie Bouvot
- Mixing assistant : Shaun DeFeo
- Executive producer Caroline Molko
- Programming : Zazie, Vincent-Marie Bouvot and Pascal Obispo
- Photo : Youri Lenquette and Jean-Christophe Polien

== Charts ==
Chart (1996)	Peak position
Belgian (Wallonia) Albums Chart	15
French SNEP Albums Chart	8

Year-end chart (1996)	Position
French Albums Chart	33
Year-end chart (1997)	Position
Belgian (Wallonia) Albums Chart	77

== Certifications and sales ==
Region	Certification	Certified units/sales
France (SNEP)	Gold	100,000^{*}
^{*} Sales figures based on certification alone.
