= The Cabining =

- Directed by: Steve Kopera
- Written by: Steve Kopera
- Produced by: Mike Kopera, Steve Kopera, Ian Michaels
- Starring: Mike Kopera, Bo Keister, Angela Relucio, Melissa Mars, Luce Rains, Richard Riehle, Mark Rademacher
- Cinematography: Jeffery T. Schultz
- Edited by: Steve Kopera
- Music by: Steve Sholtes
- Release date: May 3, 2014 (Cape Fear International Film Festival)
- Country: United States
- Language: English

The Cabining is a 2014 horror comedy directed by Steve Kopera. The story centers on two failing screenwriters who travel to a remote artists’ retreat, seeking inspiration. The retreat proves anything but serene, as the artists die off one-by-one.

== Description ==
Matt Molgaard of AddictedToHorrorMovies.com describes The Cabining as “more buddy comedy than anything else, but the tone, and the aesthetics of the film sweep viewers away in time, depositing them right back in the 1980s, when slashers were still a lot of fun, and a good kill or character could steal the heart.”

The Cabining focuses on Todd, the brains behind the screenwriting team. Todd struggles with creating a unique premise in the cliche-ridden horror genre. Ambush Bug at Ain’t It Cool News writes, “THE CABINING is a peek behind the camera at the hardships writers go through to write a script and grasp that elusive good idea.”

Todd discovers inspiration while at the artists’ retreat, as the body count increases. Mike Haberfelner at SearchMyTrash.com adds that Todd’s “creativity soars during these violent days, and he has long abandoned his silly old slasher for a brandnew whodunnit based on current events.”

The Cabining is specifically known and recognized for accentuating and playing with traditional horror tropes as, “cliches are called out and worked upon in the film.” HorrorFreakNews.com adds “The mountain of clichés that the Kopera Brothers build throughout the film could easily work as a major detriment to the final product, but that’s not the case. As the Kopera’s lay out the familiar they make sure to stand, point and laugh from a distance.”

The original title for the movie was Screamwriters.

== Synopsis ==
Todd and his feckless friend want nothing more than to write a hit horror screenplay. Todd’s wealthy uncle offers to fund the feature, but he provides one condition - they must complete it in two weeks.

With the accelerated deadline, Todd and Bruce venture to a remote artists’ retreat, hoping for inspiration. When guests start dying in mysterious, gruesome ways, Todd can’t help but be equally revolted and inspired.

With his imagination piqued, Todd must write quickly before he becomes the next victim.

== Cast ==
- Mike Kopera as Todd
- Bo Keister as Bruce
- Angela Relucio as Mindy
- Melissa Mars as Celeste
- Luce Rains as Jasper
- Richard Riehle as "Sarge"
- Mark Radermacher as Monroe
- Peter M. Howard as Lacey's Boyfriend
- Tyrone Evenson as Studio Engineer
- Ally Evenson as T's Girlfriend On Tuesday and Friday
- Pauly Zimmer as "T"

== Production ==
Principal photography took place primarily in Boyne City, Michigan and Los Angeles. The interiors scenes were shot primarily at a large house in Horton Bay, Michigan.

== Release ==
The film aired on Starz Encore throughout 2014-2015 and the Starz App in 2016-2017. Indican Pictures owns North American distribution rights, and the movie is represented by Leomark Studios.

== Critical response ==
Dread Central listed The Cabining as one of the "10 Horror Comedies a True Fan MUST See" and one of the “10 Amazing Indie Horror Films You May Have Missed.”, saying, "it’s an awesome movie that blends slasher elements with satirical elements, and it comes together beautifully."

== Select Festivals and Awards ==
Bare Bones International Film Festival 2014 - World Premiere - Winner Best Horror Feature Cape Fear Independent Film Festival 2014 - Winner Best Horror

FANtastic Horror Film Festival 2014 - Winner Best Cinematography, Best Supporting Actress (Melissa Mars), Nominated for Best Director, Best Comedy, Best Actor (Mike Kopera), Best Supporting Actor (Bo Keister)

Indie Gathering International Film Festival 2014 - Winner Best Horror Comedy

Dances with Films 2014

Kansas International Film Festival 2014

United Film Festival 2014

Brainwash Movie Festival 2014
