= Speed (Zazie song) =

Single by Zazie

from the album Essenciel
- Released: 25 May 2018
- Length: 3:49
- Songwriters: Zazie; Edith Fambuena
- Producer: Edith Fambuena

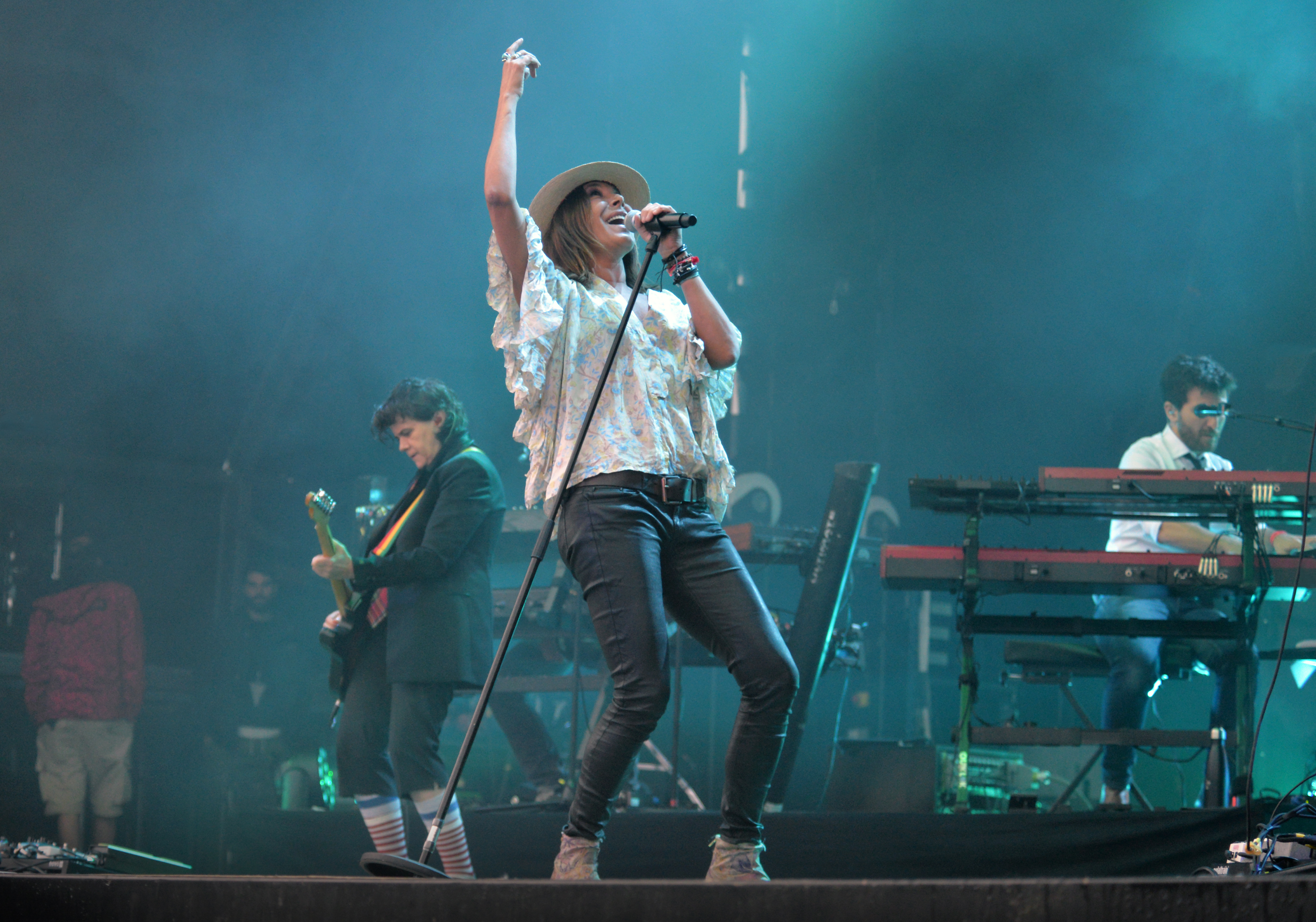
French singer Zazie in 2019

"Speed" is a song by French artist Zazie released in 2018. The song has peaked at number two on the French Singles Charts.

== Charts ==
Chart (2018)	Peak position
France (SNEP)	2
