= Za7ie =

2010 studio album by Zazie

Studio album by Zazie
- Released: 13 September 2010 (digital); 20 September 2010 (physical)
- Genre: Pop
- Label: Mercury; Universal Music

Zazie chronology
Zest of (2008)	Za7ie (2010)	Ma quête (2010)

Za7ie is a multi-release musical project by French singer-songwriter Zazie. The project, themed by days of the week consists of seven titles per day of the week for a total of 42 new recordings.

Fifteen of the titles were released in an album, Za7ie on 20 September 2010. The remainder of the titles are to be released digitally in 7 EPs, every 8 days beginning 27 September 2010 until 22 November 2010, followed finally by a physical release of all 7 EPs as part of Za7ie: l'Intégrale on 29 November 2010.

The first release of the project was the fifteen-track album, Za7ie. It features a selection of songs from the 7 EPs, with the exception of En images.

== Track listing ==
No.	Title	from EP	Length
1.	"Les Pieds nus"	Ma quête	3:13
2.	"Avant l'amour"	Ma quête	3:40
3.	"Polygame"	Ma quête	4:29
4.	"Tout va bien"	Les enfants	3:55
5.	"Je te tiens (feat. Papillon Paravel)"	Collectif	4:44
6.	"Être et avoir"	On sort	3:12
7.	"L'Amour Dollar"	Recyclage	4:12
8.	"Le Jour J (feat. Phillipe Paradis)"	Collectif	4:13
9.	"Pas que beau"	On sort	4:04
10.	"Amazone"	Recyclage	3:08
11.	"Chanson d'amour"	On sort	2:56
12.	"Je vous aime"	Collectif	3:14
13.	"La Place du vide (feat. AaRON)"	Collectif	3:03
14.	"Tindfjöll"	Relaxation	3:47

== Charts ==
=== Weekly charts ===
Chart (2010)	Peak position
Belgian Albums (Ultratop Wallonia)	1
French Albums (SNEP)	1
Swiss Albums (Schweizer Hitparade)	28

=== Year-end charts ===
Chart (2010)	Position
Belgian Albums (Ultratop Wallonia)	22
French Albums (SNEP)	36

Chart (2011)	Position
Belgian Albums (Ultratop Wallonia)	41
French Albums (SNEP)	186

== Ma quête ==
Ma quête

EP by Zazie
- Released: 27 September 2010
- Genre: Pop
- Length: 25:44
- Label: Mercury; Universal Music

Monday's EP, Ma quête (French: My quest) was released digitally on 27 September 2010.

No.	Title	Length
1.	"Les pieds nus"	3:13
2.	"Avant l'amour"	3:40
3.	"Les lendemains qui déchantent"	3:02
4.	"Lune et l'autre"	4:10
5.	"Gomme"	3:27
6.	"À copier 100 fois"	3:43
7.	"Polygame"	4:29

== En images ==
En images

EP by Zazie
- Released: 5 October 2010
- Genre: Pop
- Length: 29:24
- Label: Mercury; Universal Music

Tuesday's EP, En images (French: In images) was released digitally on 5 October 2010. This EP consists of tracks from the other six days, with accompanying videos. Consequently, this EP will be released in l'Intégrale, not as a CD but instead on DVD.

No.	Title	Length
1.	"L'une et l'autre"	4:08
2.	"Plus fort"	6:25
3.	"Aïe Love You"	4:04
4.	"Les gens passent"	3:41
5.	"Je vous aime"	3:17
6.	"Pas que beau"	4:05
7.	"Tindfjöll"	3:44

== Les enfants ==
Les enfants

EP by Zazie
- Released: 13 October 2010
- Genre: Pop
- Length: 23:53
- Label: Mercury; Universal Music

Wednesday's EP, Les enfants (French: The children) was released digitally on 13 October 2010.

No.	Title	Length
1.	"Bien au chaud"	2:43
2.	"À la terre"	3:11
3.	"Trodeshoz"	3:09
4.	"Les mots de Faon"	3:07
5.	"Tout va bien"	3:55
6.	"Ma tribu"	3:45
7.	"Aïe Love You"	4:03

== Recyclage ==
Recyclage

EP by Zazie
- Released: 21 October 2010
- Genre: Pop
- Length: 27:37
- Label: Mercury; Universal Music

Thursday's EP, Recyclage (French: Recycling) was released digitally on 21 October 2010.

No.	Title	Length
1.	"L'amour dollar"	4:12
2.	"L'œil du cyclone"	3:42
3.	"Les poupées Zarbie"	3:44
4.	"L'heure H"	4:12
5.	"Amazone"	3:07
6.	"Les gens passent"	3:39
7.	"L'addition"	5:01

== Collectif ==
Collectif

EP by Zazie
- Released: 29 October 2010
- Genre: Pop
- Length: 27:42
- Label: Mercury; Universal Music

Friday's EP, Collectif (French: Collective) was released digitally on 29 October 2010.

No.	Title	Length
1.	"Le jour J (avec Philippe Paradis)"	4:14
2.	"Des astres (avec -M-)"	4:44
3.	"Je vous aime"	3:13
4.	"Je te tiens (avec Papillon Paravel)"	4:47
5.	"Double Axel (avec Axel Bauer)"	4:30
6.	"Valse à 7 temps"	3:10
7.	"La place du vide (avec AaRON)"	3:04

== On Sort ==
On Sort

EP by Zazie
- Released: 6 November 2010
- Genre: Pop
- Length: 28:06
- Label: Mercury; Universal Music

Saturday's EP, On Sort (French: Stepping out) was released digitally on 6 November 2010.

No.	Title	Length
1.	"Electro libre"	3:00
2.	"Chanson d'amour"	2:56
3.	"Être et avoir"	3:12
4.	"Pas que beau"	4:04
5.	"Transe siberian"	3:15
6.	"Plus fort"	6:20
7.	"Le dimanche"	5:19

== Relaxation ==
Relaxation

EP by Zazie
- Released: 14 November 2010
- Genre: Pop
- Length: 33:46
- Label: Mercury; Universal Music

Zazie chronology
On Sort (2010)	Relaxation (2010)	Cyclo (2013)

Sunday's EP, Relaxation was released digitally on 14 November 2010.

No.	Title	Length
1.	"SPA"	6:25
2.	"Vibra Massage"	5:06
3.	"Tindfjöll"	3:41
4.	"Nymphi"	5:45
5.	"Belleville Plage"	5:08
6.	"Vladivostok"	3:49
7.	"Prague 77"	3:52
