= Totem (Zazie album) =

Studio album by Zazie
- Released: 5 February 2007
- Genre: Pop
- Label: Mercury; Universal Music

Zazie chronology
Rodéo Tour (2006)	Totem (2007)	Zest of (2008)

Singles from Totem
- 1. "Des rails" Released: 2007; 2. "Je suis un homme" Released: 2007; 3. "J'étais là" Released: April 2008; 4. "Flower power" Released: 2008

Totem is a 2007 album recorded by French pop singer Zazie. It was her sixth studio album, and her ninth album overall. It was released first digitally on 5 February 2007, then as a CD one week later. The album achieved success in francophone countries.

== Background and release ==
As for her previous album Rodéo, Zazie participated in the writing and the composing, alongside her friends Jean-Pierre Pilot and Philippe Paradis. A duet with Scottish singer-songwriter Paolo Nutini appears in the track listing.

Unlike for her previous album, Zazie released "Totem" under various formats, including a collector edition composed of a set box and a 68-page booklet (illustrating the lyrics with photos of the singer in Iceland produced by Laurent Seroussi), a mini-CD with the demos of the songs "Je suis un homme" and "Jet lag" and a new song in English, "I Fall". The 2007 Christmas edition contains two other unpublished songs, including "Haut les mains", a song performed for the first time on stage at the Zénith in Nantes on 1 June 2007. This Christmas edition is also composed of a DVD with the music videos of "Des rails" and "Je suis un homme" as well as of their making-of, the making-of the album and the videos of preview for the Internet.

The album provided five singles, but four of them were only released under promotional formats; "Je suis un homme" was a hit in France and Belgium where it peaked at number seven.

== Chart performance and accolades ==
The album went straight to number-one in France and stayed for 101 weeks in the top 200. It also reached number-one, the second week of its release, in Belgium (Wallonia) and totalled 84 weeks in the top 100. It was ranked for 18 weeks in Switzerland but reached number ten.

The album was also nominated in the category 'Album of varieties' at the 2008 Victoires de la Musique, but didn't win.

== Track listings ==
All lyrics are written by Zazie; all music is composed by Zazie, Jean-Pierre Pilot, and Philippe Paradis.

Totem – Standard edition
No.	Title	Length
1.	"Des rails"	3:32
2.	"Je suis un homme"	4:11
3.	"L'Ange blessé"	4:15
4.	"Jet Lag"	3:48
5.	"Duo" (featuring Paolo Nutini)	3:06
6.	"Ça"	3:19
7.	"Flower Power"	2:54
8.	"Totem"	3:47
9.	"07 Déc."	4:43
10.	"J'étais là"	3:10
11.	"Yin Yang"	3:12
12.	"Vue du ciel"	3:49
Total length:		23:29

Totem – 2007 Christmas edition
No.	Title	Length
13.	"Frère Jacques" (Digital version only)	3:40
14.	"Haut les mains"	3:23

== Credits and personnel ==
- Acoustic guitar and bass : Nicolas Fiszma
- Percussion and drums : David Salkin
- Piano, programming and keyboards : Jean-Pierre Pilot
- Sound assistant : Marc Guéroult
- Mixing : Yves Jaget and Jean-Pierre Pilot
- Executive producer : Sandrine Le Bars
- Mastering : Mike Marsh
- Photo and design : Laurent Seroussi

== Charts ==
Chart (2007–08)	Peak position
Belgian (Wallonia) Albums Chart	1
French SNEP Albums Chart	1
French SNEP Digital Chart	1
Swiss Albums Chart	10

Year-end chart (2007)	Position
Belgian (Wallonia) Albums Chart	4
French Albums Chart	11
French Digital Chart	6

== Certifications and sales ==
Region	Certification	Certified units/sales
Belgium (BRMA)	Gold	25,000^{*}
^{*} Sales figures based on certification alone.
