= Made in Love =

Studio album by Zazie
- Released: 11 May 1998
- Genre: Pop; pop rock
- Length: 53:55
- Label: Mercury; Universal Music; Polygram

Zazie chronology
Zen (1995)	Made in Love (1998)	Ze Live (1999)

Singles from Made in Love
- 1. "Tous des anges" Released: 1998; 2. "Ça fait mal et ça fait rien" Released: 1998; 3. "Tout le monde" Released: 1998; 4. "Chanson d'ami" Released: 1999; 5. "Made in love" Released: 1999

Made in Love is a 1998 album recorded by French pop singer Zazie. It was her third studio album and was released on 11 May 1998. It achieved success in francophone countries, although it was not as successful as Zazie's next albums. It provided five singles, two of which were only released as promotional singles. Except for "Tout le monde" (#23 in France), they did not make it to the Top 40: "Tous des anges" (#87 in France), "Ça fait mal et ça fait rien" (#75 in France).

== Background, singles, and chart performance ==
The album was produced by Ali Staton, Pierre Jaconelli and Zazie. It was scheduled to be published on 5 May 1998, but was delayed to avoid a release at the same moment as Pascal Obispo's live album. Obispo did not compose any tunes for Made in Love. However, he had worked on a song entitled "Amazone", which was eventually not included in the track listing.

The music video for "Ça fait mal et ça fait rien", the second single, was censored on television because of its violent content. It presented several couples in which the husband was unfaithful and the wife have different reactions that lead in some instances lead to murder. Part of the music video was subtitled in English. "Femmes téfales" deals with liars and conniving women.

In France, the album debuted at a peak of number three on 16 May 1998. It dropped rather quickly, but remained in the top 50 for 29 weeks. In Belgium (Wallonia), the album was stayed 39 weeks in the Ultratop 50, peaking at 17 during its third week, on 13 June 1998.

== Track listing ==
All songs written and composed by Zazie except where noted.

Made in Love – Standard edition
No.	Title	Length
1.	"Tous des anges"	5:28
2.	"Ça fait mal et ça fait rien"	4:30
3.	"Femmes tefales"	4:03
4.	"Made in Love"	3:49
5.	"Cyber"	4:19
6.	"La Preuve par trois"	5:26
7.	"Tout le monde"	4:06
8.	"Autant de peine que de toi"	4:41
9.	"La Vie devant moi"	4:14
10.	"Sous le voile"	4:30
11.	"Stop"	4:09
12.	"Chanson d’ami" (Music by Phil Baron, music by Zazie)	4:40
Total length:		53:55

Made in Love – French 2nd edition
No.	Title	Length
13.	"Tout le monde" (Replicant Mix)	4:45
Total length:		58:40

Made in Love – Japanese edition
No.	Title	Length
13.	"Rose"	3:39
Total length:		57:44

== Credits and personnel ==
- Guitar : Pierre Jaconelli
- Orchestra : Marc Desmons, Mishko M'Ba, Yves Melon, Patrice Mondon, Philippe Nadal and Cyrille Lacrouts
- Percussion, cymbals, caxixi, djembe, talking drum, udu : Steve Shehan
- Piano : Christophe Voisin
- Violone : Maxine Garoute and Christophe Guiot
- Mastering : Ian Cooper
- Assistant engineer : Manu Pothier
- Arranger : Olivier Schulteis
- Engineer : Ali Staton
- Liner notes : Zazie
- Producer : Ali Staton, Pierre Jaconelli and Zazie
- Artwork, graphic Design : Michel Mallard
- Photo : Jean Baptiste Mondino

== Release history ==
Date	Label	Region	Format	Catalog
11 May 1998	Mercury	Belgium, France, Switzerland	CD	272338
1 November 1998	Mercury	Japan	CD	PHCR-1673
30 November 1998	Mercury	Belgium, France, Switzerland	CD	550080
2001	Polygram International	Belgium, France, Switzerland	CD	538722

== Charts ==
Chart (1998)	Peak position
Belgian (Wallonia) Albums Chart	17
French SNEP Albums Chart	3

Year-end chart (1998)	Position
Belgian (Wallonia) Albums Chart	72
French Albums Chart	54

== Certifications and sales ==
Region	Certification	Certified units/sales
France (SNEP)	Gold	100,000^{*}
^{*} Sales figures based on certification alone.
