= À ma place =

Single by Zazie and Axel Bauer

from the album Personne n'est parfait
- B-side: "Tu seras bien"
- Released: 7 May 2001
- Genre: Pop; rock
- Length: 4:30 (single version); 5:28 (album version)
- Label: Mercury; Universal Music
- Songwriters: Zazie; Axel Bauer
- Producers: Pierre Jaconelli; Axel Bauer

Zazie singles chronology
"Cyber" (1999)	"À ma place" (2001)	"Rue de la Paix" (2001)

"À ma place" is a 2001 pop song recorded as a duet by French singers Zazie and Axel Bauer. It was the second single off Bauer's album Personne n'est parfait and was released on 7 May 2001. It became a smash hit in France and Belgium (Wallonia) where it reached the top five.

== Song information ==
The song was written and composed by both singers. It deals with the difficulties that can be met by a couple to understand each other. According to Elia Habib, the story of the song "[oscillates] between passion and insanity". The music video and the cover single are very refined and the song looks like a "dramatic script meticulously directed".

The music video was directed by Didier Le Pêcheur who had previously directed five music videos for Zazie at the time.

"À ma place" was not included on Zazie's studio album, but only on Bauer's Personne n'est parfait on which it appears in an extended version, then on Bauer's best of La Désintégrale. In 2003, the live version performed during Zazie's tour was added on her live album Ze live!! and in the collector edition of La Désintégrale. The song, as well as the music video (on the DVD), were also available on Zazie's 2008 greatest hits Zest of.

== Chart performance and awards ==
In France, the single debuted at No. 33 on 12 May 2001, then climbed directly to the top ten and remained in it for 17 weeks, including a peak at number four for two consecutive weeks. It totalled 30 weeks in the top 50 and 32 weeks in the top 100 and earned a Gold disc. In Belgium (Wallonia), it debuted at No. 32 on 4 August 2001 and reached number one four weeks later. It remained for 12 weeks in the top ten and 25 weeks in the Ultratop 50. To date, "À ma place" is the most successful single of both singers in terms of chart positions.

The song was awarded 'Francophone song of the year' at the 2002 NRJ Music Awards and was thus included on the compilation NRJ Music Awards 2002.

== Track listings ==
CD single

No.	Title	Length
1.	"À ma place"	4:30
2.	"Tu seras bien" (by Axel Bauer)	3:55

Digital download (since 2005)

No.	Title	Length
1.	"À ma place" (album version)	5:28
2.	"À ma place" (2003 live)	4:48
3.	"À ma place" (Zest of version)	5:49

== Charts ==
=== Weekly charts ===
Weekly chart performance for "À ma place"
Chart (2001)	Peak position
Belgium (Wallonia Ultratop 40)	1
France (SNEP)	4

=== Year-end charts ===
Year-end chart performance for "À ma place"
Chart (2001)	Position
Belgium (Wallonia Ultratop 40)	12
Europe (Eurochart Hot 100)	68
France (SNEP)	13

== Certifications and sales ==
Region	Certification	Certified units/sales
France (SNEP)	Gold	250,000^{*}
^{*} Sales figures based on certification alone.
