= Karine Costa =

French singer

- Born: Karine Costa; Paris
- Origin: France
- Genres: Pop
- Occupation: Singer
- Years active: 1992–2003

Karine Costa (born 1977) is a French singer, particularly known for her songs from Disney films.

== Musical career ==
She is the singing voice of Jasmine in the animated film Aladdin, produced by Disney studios and released in 1992. She has recorded "Ce Rêve bleu" (the French adaptation of "A Whole New World") in duet first with Paolo Domingo, then with Daniel Lévi (#3 in France), and "Tombé du ciel" with Emmanuel Dahl. She has also recorded the song "C'est la vie" for the film Bambi 2. She had a hit with her own version of Burt Bacharach's song, "I Say a Little Prayer" (made famous by Dionne Warwick) that is currently used in France in the TV advert for the Crédit mutuel.

== Discography ==
=== Albums ===
- 1995 : Seventeen
- 1998 : Disney Party Album (10 Tubes Endiablés Pour Faire La Fête)

=== Singles ===
Year	Title	Chart		Certification (FR)
Year	Title	FR	SWI	Certification (FR)
1993	"Ce Rêve bleu"	3	—	Silver
1996	"You"	20	—	—
2002	"I Say a Little Prayer"	16	82	Silver
2003	"Plus Que Des Mots"	-	-	-
2003	"Hold On"	-	-	-
