= Zazie =

French singer (born 1964)

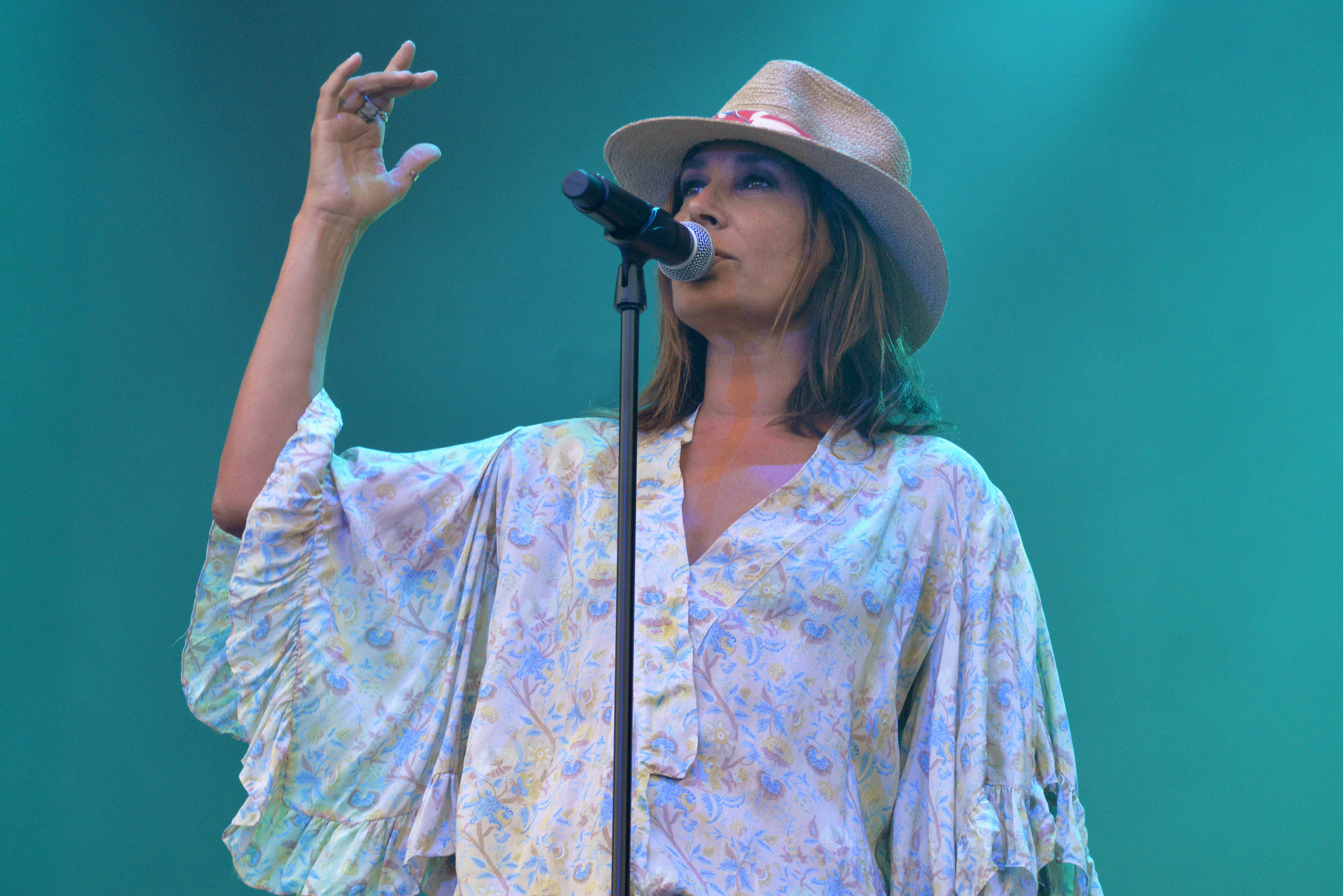
- Zazie in 2019

Background information
- Born: Isabelle de Truchis de Varennes; 18 April 1964 (age 62); Boulogne-Billancourt, France
- Genres: Pop; pop rock
- Occupations: Singer; songwriter; record producer
- Instrument: Vocals • piano • guitar
- Years active: 1992–present
- Labels: Universal Music; Wrasse (UK)
- Website: zazieonline.com

Isabelle Marie Anne de Truchis de Varennes (born 18 April 1964), better known by her stage name Zazie, is a French pop singer and songwriter. Her greatest hits include "Je suis un homme", "À ma place" and "Speed". She co-produces all her albums and is noted for her playful use of language.

== Biography ==
=== Early life ===
Isabelle de Truchis de Varennes was born on 18 April 1964 in Boulogne-Billancourt, France. She was nicknamed "Zazie" in reference to the title character of the Raymond Queneau novel Zazie dans le métro. Her mother was a music teacher and her father, Hervé de Truchis de Varennes, was an architect. At home, they listened to Georges Brassens, Jacques Brel and Barbara, as well as classical music. Inspired, Zazie began learning to play the violin at the age of ten, later teaching herself to play the piano and guitar. After high school, Zazie began studying to become a psychotherapist; however, her classic beauty and nearly six-foot stature caught the attention of modelling agents, and she abandoned her schooling to become a fashion model.

=== 1992: Initial forays into music and Je, Tu, Ils ===
In 1990, Zazie began her musical career. She signed a contract with Phonogram in 1991. In 1992, she released Je, tu, ils, her first album recorded in the studios of Peter Gabriel. She collaborated for the first time with Pascal Obispo on the song "Un, deux, trois, soleil". She wrote almost all the tracks of the album and participated in the composition. The album had minor success, and the single "Sucré salé" was ranked No. 46 on the Top 50 (French SNEP Singles Chart). The following year, Zazie was awarded 'Best New Female Pop Artist of the Year' (révélation variétés féminine de l'année) at the Victoires de la musique. The other two singles from the albums were much less successful, but the singer's career was launched. Her record label agreed to sign for a second album.

From Je, tu, ils Zazie distinguished herself as a songwriter by crafting songs notable for their wit, alliteration, homophonies and double entendres.

=== From 1995: Success ===
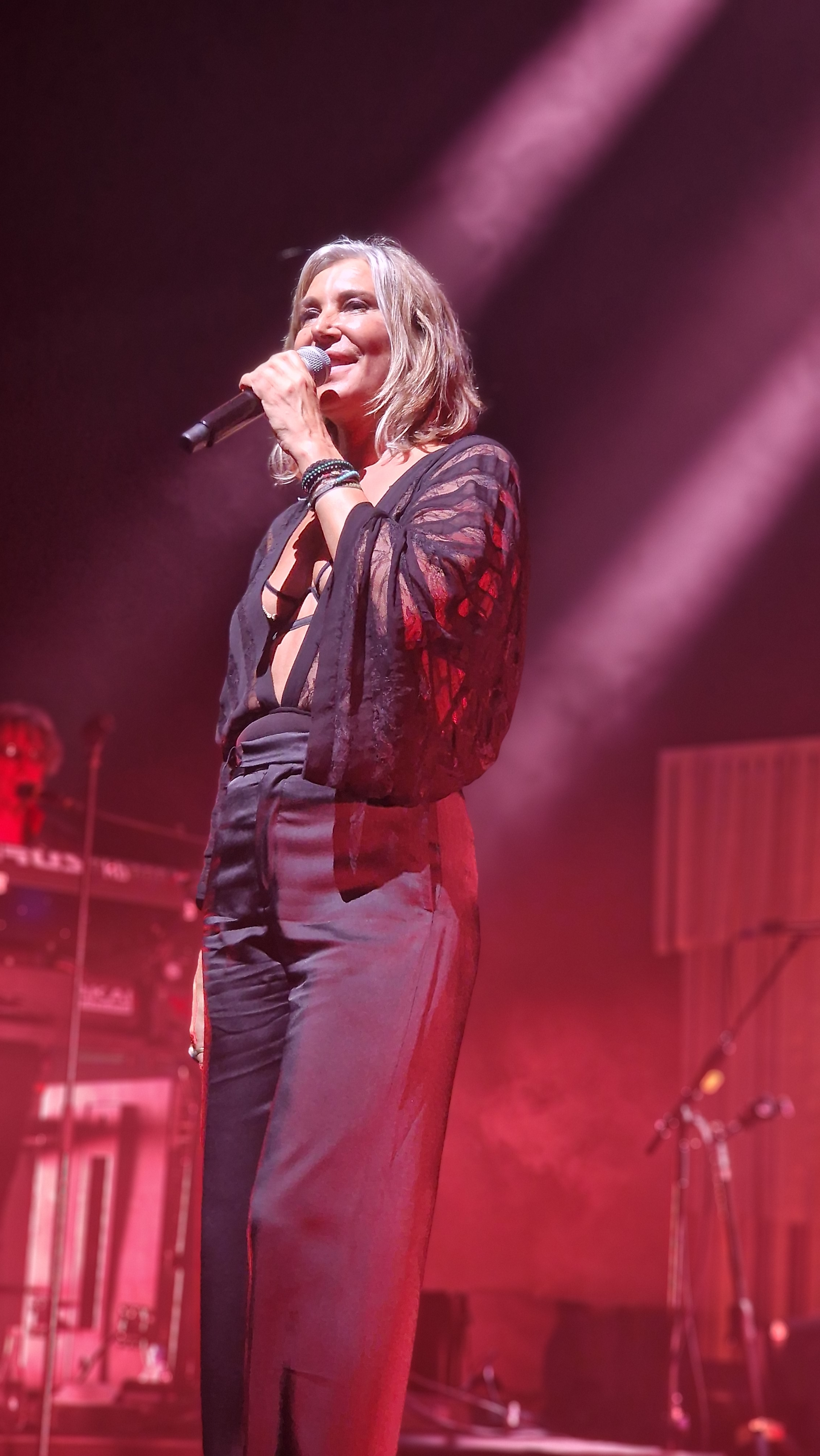
Zazie performing in 2023

In 1995, she released her second album Zen, which was co-written by and co-produced with Vincent-Marie Bouvot. The album produced the singles "Zen" and "Homme sweet homme". Her 1996 single "Un point c'est toi" from the same album was discussed on Canada's MuchMusic TV program Too Much 4 Much because of its controversial content. Ultimately, the discussion panel deemed the video okay for audiences. In the video, a group of four smitten women, including Zazie, follow a pair of men down to a lake. There, the two men strip off their clothes and swim in the water. Zazie fantasizes about undressing one of the men and kissing him. However, her fantasies are spoiled as the two men kiss each other.

In 1997, Pascal Obispo and Zazie released the single "Les meilleurs ennemis".

Her 1998 album Made in Love was co-produced by Ali Staton, Pierre Jaconelli, and herself. The album photos were taken by fashion designer Jean-Baptiste Mondino. The songs "Ça fait mal et ça fait rien", "Tous des anges", and "Tout le monde" were released as singles. This album was followed by a live album, Made in Live, the next year. In 1999 she also wrote a song for Jane Birkin.

In 2001, Zazie teamed up with Axel Bauer on the single "À ma place". It was her most successful single in France, reaching number four on the French charts.

Zazie once again addressed homosexuality on her 2002 single "Adam et Yves" from her 2001 album La Zizanie. This album was produced solely by Pierre Jaconelli. Other singles included "Rue de la paix" and "Danse avec les loops". In 2003, she released another live album, Ze Live.

Her 2004 album Rodéo was co-produced with Jean-Pierre Pilot and Philippe Paradis. The video for the single "Excuse-moi" features Zazie playing the role of an Indian woman who leaves her cheating husband. She followed this album up with a live album, Rodéo Tour in 2006.

Her sixth album, Totem, was released in February 2007. Like her previous album, it was co-produced with Jean-Pierre Pilot and Philippe Paradis. The "Totem Tour" began on 1 July.

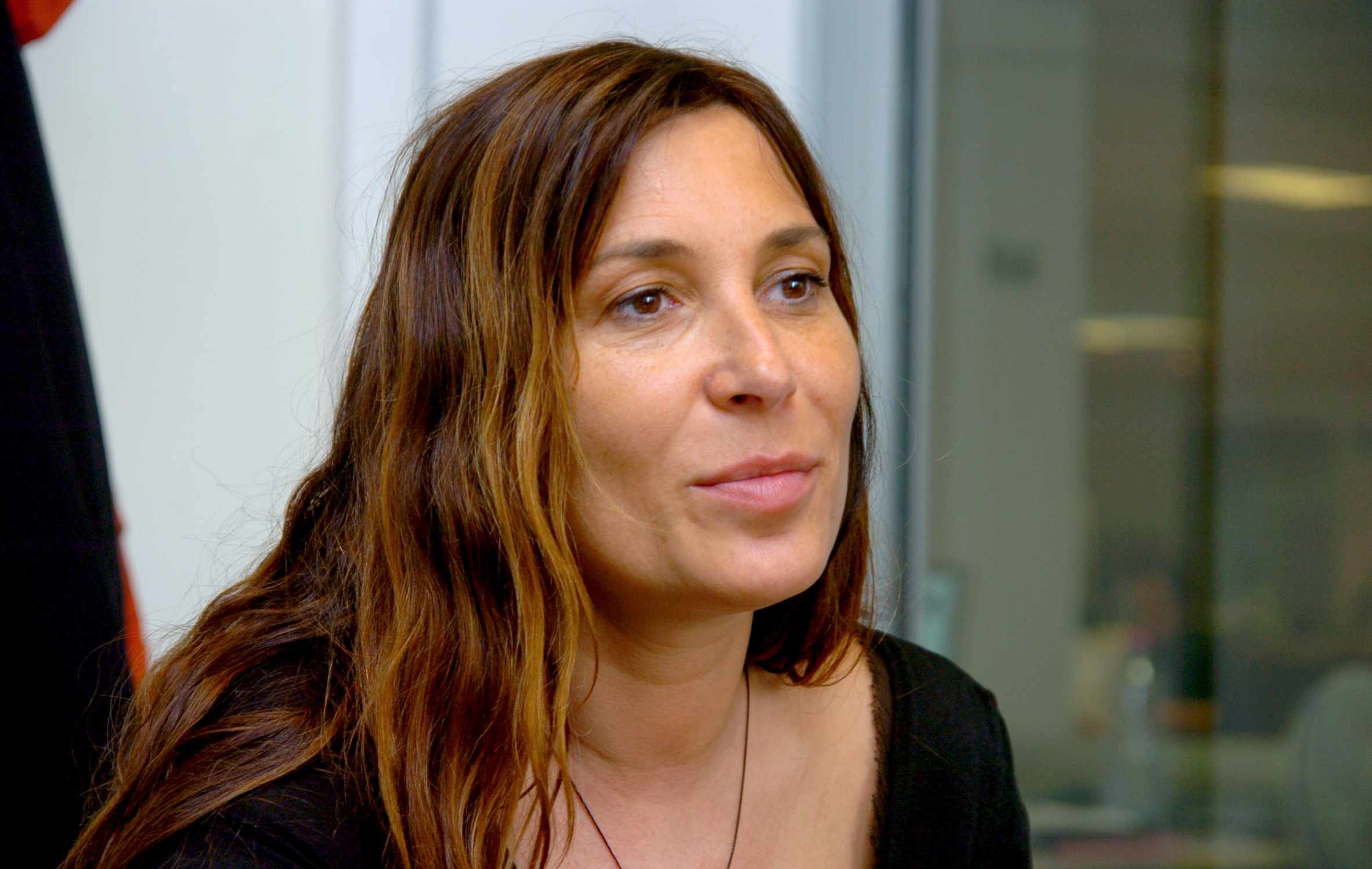
Zazie in Paris in 2007.

Also in 2007, she wrote several songs for Christophe Willem's album, Inventaire.

In June 2010, Zazie released a new single "Avant l'amour" (Before Love). Avant l'amour was the first single from the album "Za7ie"; it reached No. 54 on the French SNEP radio airplay chart.

"Za7ie" was constructed as a concept project of 49 songs, split into seven theme albums of seven songs each. A shorter version with 14 songs was released in September 2010, with the 49 song project released as a box set in November of the same year.

Zazie announced eighth album, "Cyclo", which is scheduled for release in spring 2013. The album was produced by Olivier Coursier of AaRON and mixed by Tony Hoffer.

In 2015, she released her ninth album "Encore heureux".

On 24 May 2018, Zazie released a single "Speed". Her tenth studio album, "Essenciel" was released on 7 September 2018. On 5 October, the SNEP announces that the disc is certified gold. On 15 February 2019 "Essenciel" was certified platinum for more than 100,000 copies sold. on 15 February 2019.

Her new tour "Essenciel Tour" began in March 2019.

=== Other activities ===
Zazie co-composed the music of the 1997 film Ma vie en rose.

Zazie made her acting debut in the 1998 film by Didier Le Pêcheur "J'aimerais pas crever un dimanche" (Don't Let Me Die on a Sunday).,

In 2007, Zazie wrote and co-composed seven of the fifteen tracks of Christophe Willem's first album, Inventaire, while also providing backing vocals in the tracks she wrote.

In 2009, she participated in Rendez-vous en terre inconnue.

Zazie started coaching on the French version of The Voice in 2015 and one of her team, Lilian Renaud, won that 4th season. She again coached in 2016, 2017, 2018, 2023 and 2024. She also participated in 2021 for All Stars format.

Zazie has been a member of the Les Enfoirés charity ensemble since 1997.

== Personal life ==
Zazie's father came from a family of aristocratic background.

Zazie and her former partner, Fabien Cahen, have a daughter, Lola, who was born on 16 August 2002.

== Awards and nominations ==
Award	Year	Nominee(s)	Category	Result	Ref.
NRJ Music Awards	2000	Made in Live	Concert of the Year	Nominated	
NRJ Music Awards	2000	Herself	Music Website of the Year	Nominated	
NRJ Music Awards	2002	"À ma place" (with Axel Bauer)	Francophone Song of the Year	Won	
NRJ Music Awards	2002	Zazie and Axel Bauer	Francophone Duo/Group of the Year	Nominated	
NRJ Music Awards	2002	La Zizanie	Francophone Album of the Year	Nominated	
NRJ Music Awards	2002	Herself	Francophone Female Artist of the Year	Nominated	
NRJ Music Awards	2003	Herself	Francophone Female Artist of the Year	Nominated	
Victoires de la Musique	1993	Herself	Female Revelation of the Year	Won	
Victoires de la Musique	1996	Herself	Female Artist of the Year	Nominated	
Victoires de la Musique	1996	"Larsen"	Music Video of the Year	Won	
Victoires de la Musique	1997	"Un point c'est toi"	Music Video of the Year	Nominated	
Victoires de la Musique	1997	Herself	Female Artist of the Year	Nominated	
Victoires de la Musique	1998	Herself	Female Artist of the Year	Won	
Victoires de la Musique	1998	"Les meilleurs ennemis"	Music Video of the Year	Nominated	
Victoires de la Musique	1999	"Ça fait mal et ça fait rien"	Music Video of the Year	Nominated	
Victoires de la Musique	1999	Made in Love	Pop/Rock Album of the Year	Nominated	
Victoires de la Musique	2002	Herself	Female Group or Artist of the Year	Won	
Victoires de la Musique	2002	La Zizanie	Song/Variety Album of the Year	Nominated	
Victoires de la Musique	2002	"À ma place" (with Axel Bauer)	Original Song of the Year	Nominated	
Victoires de la Musique	2006	Herself	Female Group or Artist of the Year	Nominated	
Victoires de la Musique	2006	Rodeo Tour	Musical Show, Tour or Concert of the Year	Won	
Victoires de la Musique	2007	Rodéo Tour	Music DVD of the Year	Nominated	
Victoires de la Musique	2008	Herself	Female Group or Artist of the Year	Nominated	
Victoires de la Musique	2008	Totem	Song/Variety Album of the Year	Nominated	
Victoires de la Musique	2008	"Je suis un homme"	Original Song of the Year	Nominated	
Victoires de la Musique	2008	"Je suis un homme"	Music Video of the Year	Nominated	
Victoires de la Musique	2008	Totem Tour	Musical Show, Tour or Concert of the Year	Nominated	
Victoires de la Musique	2009	"J'étais là"	Music Video of the Year	Nominated	

== Discography ==
=== Studio albums ===
Year	Album	FR	BE (Fl)	BE (Wa)	SWI	Sales
1992	Je, Tu, Ils	173	–	–	–	
1995	Zen	8	–	15	–	France: Gold (300,000+)
1998	Made in Love	3	–	17	–	France: Gold (345,000)
2001	La Zizanie	1	–	1	28	France: Platinum (447,600)
2004	Rodéo	2	–	2	45	France: Platinum (315,600)
2007	Totem	1	–	1	10	France: Platinum (400,000)
2010	Za7ie	1	–	1	28	France: Platinum (120,000)
2013	Cyclo	3	70	3	22	France: Gold (60,000)
2015	Encore Heureux	4	196	2	12	France: Gold (55,000)
2018	Essenciel	2	176	2	8	France: Platinum (100,000)
2022	Aile-P	15	—	12	45	
2023	Air	20	—	19	—	
2026	Volatil	—	—	1	12	

=== Live albums ===
Year	Album	FR	BE	SWI	Sales
1999	Made in Live	30	39	–	France: Silver (75,000)
2003	Ze Live!!	3	6	47	France: Gold (120,000)
2006	Rodéo Tour	12	7	79	France: 26,000

=== Compilation albums ===
Year	Album	FR	BE	SWI	Sales
2008	Zest of	1^{1}	1	39	France: 152,650+
2015	Les 50 plus belles chansons	18	–	–	
2016	L'intégraRe	139	–	–	

^{1} Reached No. 1 on the French compilations chart.

=== Extended plays ===
Year	Album	BE (Wa)
2022	L'EP	107

=== Singles ===
Year	Single	FR	BE Top	BE Tip	Album
1992	"Sucré, salé"	46	-	-	Je, Tu, Ils
1992	"Je, tu, ils"^{A}	-	-	-	Je, Tu, Ils
1992	"Un petit peu amoureux"^{A}	-	-	-	Je, Tu, Ils
1995	"Larsen"	38	-	-	Zen
1995	"Zen"	23	-	-	Zen
1996	"Un point c'est toi"	24	-	-	Zen
1996	"Homme sweet homme"	-	-	-	Zen
1997	"Les meilleurs ennemis" (with Pascal Obispo)	39	20	-	Superflu (Obispo album)
1998	"Tous des anges"	87	-	-	Made in Love
1998	"Ça fait mal et ca fait rien"	75	-	-	Made in Love
1998	"Tout le monde"	23	34	-	Made in Love
1998	"Made in Love"^{A}	-	-	-	Made in Love
1998	"Chanson d'ami"^{A}	-	-	-	Made in Love
1999	"Cyber"^{A}	-	-	-	Made in Live
2001	"À ma place" (with Axel Bauer)	4	1	-	Personne n'est parfait (Bauer album)
2001	"Rue de la paix"	11	11	-	La Zizanie
2002	"Adam et Yves"	22	-	2	La Zizanie
2002	"Sur toi"^{A}	-	-	-	La Zizanie
2003	"Danse avec les loops"	53	-	7	La Zizanie
2004	"Rodéo"^{A}	-	-	-	Rodéo
2004	"Toc, Toc, Toc"^{A}	-	-	-	Rodéo
2004	"Excuse-moi"^{A}	-	-	-	Rodéo
2004	"Oui"^{A}	-	-	-	Rodéo
2007	"Des rails"	-	25	-	Totem
2007	"Je suis un homme"	7	7	-	Totem
2007	"J'étais là"^{A}	-	-	23	Totem
2008	"Flower power"	-	-	-	Totem
2008	"FM Air"	8	19	-	Zest of Zazie
2010	"Avant l'amour"	-	8	-	Za7ie
2010	"Etre et avoir"	-	-	-	Za7ie
2011	"Chanson d'amour"	-	-	-	Za7ie
2011	"Me taire te plaire" (with Mademoiselle K)	-	-	-	Jouer dehors
2013	"Les contraires"	34	-	-	Cyclo
2013	"20 ans"	-	-	48	Cyclo
2013	"Temps plus vieux"	-	-	-	Cyclo
2015	"Discold"	42	30	-	Encore Heureux
2015	"Pise"	87	-	-	Encore Heureux
2016	"Faut pas s'y fier"	-	-	-	Encore Heureux
2018	"Speed"	2	-	-	Essenciel
2018	"L'Essenciel"	-	-	-	Essenciel
2019	"Nos âmes sont"	-	-	-	Essenciel
2022	"Let it shine"	-	-	-	TBA
2023	"Comment on fait" (with Vianney)	37	-	-	TBA

^{A} Promotional release only.

=== Other charted songs ===
Year	Song	FR	Album
2015	"Adieu tristesse"	102	Encore Heureux
2015	"Encore heureux"	122	Encore Heureux

== Awards ==
- Victoires de la musique :
  - Musical show, tour or concert of the year (2006)
  - Female group or artist of the year (2002)
  - Female artist of the year (1998)
  - Music video of the year: Larsen, directed by Philippe Andre; (1996)
  - Popular music Female révélation of the year (1993)
- NRJ Music Awards :
  - Best French language song (2002) with Axel Bauer for À ma place

Altogether she has six awards.
