= La Zizanie =

Studio album by Zazie
- Released: 16 October 2001
- Recorded: 2001
- Studio: Studio Méga (Suresnes)
- Genre: Pop
- Length: 56:26
- Label: Mercury; Universal Music
- Producer: Pierre Jaconelli; Zazie

Zazie chronology
Made in Live (1999)	La Zizanie (2001)	Ze Live (2003)

Singles from La Zizanie
- 1. "Rue de la paix" Released: 2001; 2. "Adam & Yves" Released: 2002; 3. "Sur toi" Released: 2002; 4. "Danse avec les loops" Released: 2003

La Zizanie is a 2001 album recorded by French pop singer Zazie. It was her fourth studio album and her fifth album overall. It was released on 16 October 2001 and achieved success in francophone countries. It provided five singles (two of them were only released as promotional singles) including two hits: "Rue de la paix" (#11 in France and Belgium) and "Adam & Yves" (#22 in France), and the minor hit "Danse avec les loops" (#53 in France).

Zazie wanted first to entitle the album "La Zazizanie" without mentioning her name on the cover but this idea was finally cancelled because it was not a concept album. The limited edition was presented in an octagonal set box.

== Chart performance and accolades ==
The album went straight to number-one in France on 20 October 2001 and totaled ten weeks in the top ten and 55 weeks on the chart (top 200). In Belgium (Wallonia), the album debuted at #4 on 27 October 2001, then climbed to number-one. It remained for 14 weeks in the top ten and 34 weeks in the top 50. In Switzerland, the album was ranked for 15 weeks, including a peak at #28 in its first week of release, on 28 October 2001.

The album was nominated in the category 'Pop album of the year' at the 2002 Victoires de la Musique.

== Track listing ==
All songs written and composed by Zazie except where noted.

La Zizanie – Standard edition
No.	Title	Length
1.	"Rue de la paix"	4:16
2.	"On éteint"	4:22
3.	"Danse avec les loops"	4:35
4.	"Adam et Yves" (Lyrics by Joëlle Kopf)	4:41
5.	"Aux armes citoyennes"	4:44
6.	"Sur toi"	4:07
7.	"La Zizanie"	4:50
8.	"Cheese"	4:36
9.	"Tais-toi et rap"	3:42
10.	"Dans la lune" (Music by Fabien Cahen)	3:15
11.	"Qui m'aime me fuit" (Music by Phil Baron)	4:23
12.	"La Fan de sa vie"	3:37
13.	"Si j'étais moi"	5:18
Total length:		56:26

== Credits and personnel ==
- Acoustic and electric guitar : Pierre Jaconelli
- Bass : Nicolas Fiszman
- Drums : David Salkin
- Digital editing : Manu Goulet
- Mixing assistant : Sylvain Carpentier
- Engineer : Pete Schwier
- Mastering : Tim Young
- Pre-production : Jean-Pierre Pilot and Pierre Jaconelli

== Charts ==
Chart (2001–03)	Peak position
Belgian (Wallonia) Albums Chart	1
French SNEP Albums Chart	1
Swiss Albums Chart	28

Year-end chart (2004)	Position
Belgian (Wallonia) Albums Chart	32
French Albums Chart	18
Year-end chart (2002)	Position
Belgian (Wallonia) Albums Chart	50
French Albums Chart	70

== Certifications and sales ==
Region	Certification	Certified units/sales
Belgium (BRMA)	Gold	25,000^{*}
France (SNEP)	Platinum	300,000^{*}
^{*} Sales figures based on certification alone.
