= Melissa Mars =

French actress and singer

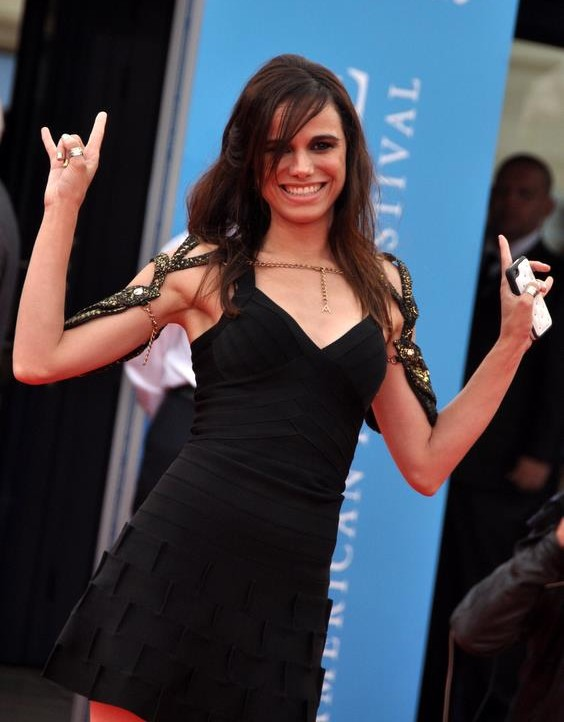
- Mars at the 2012 Deauville American Film Festival
- Born: 3 September 1979 (age 46); Marseille, France
- Occupations: Actress; singer-songwriter; director; photographer
- Website: melissamars.com

Melissa Mars (born 3 September 1979) is a French singer, songwriter and actress. She rose to prominence in the early 2000s for her performances on stage.

Hailing from Marseille, France, Melissa Mars displayed an early interest in the performing arts. She embarked on her career as a singer, debuting with her single "Elle" in 2003. Over the years, she released three solo albums under Universal Music and collaborated on duets, notably "1980," which achieved No. 5 on the charts. Mars also appeared in the production of Mozart, l'opéra rock.

== Biography ==
Mars started acting at the age of 13 in her hometown of Marseille, France. At 16, she moved to Paris with her single mother and continued acting while pursuing a curriculum of math and science at Lycée Louis-le-Grand.

She made her film debut in the Laurent Heynemann feature, One Way Ticket. She became a singer-songwriter, partnering with Lilas Klif, her mother, to co-author lyrics. She released three solo albums with Polydor and Universal Music, and several duets. Her single from 1980 reached No. 5 in the charts.

In 2009, she played a leading role in the rock musical Mozart, l'opéra rock, directed by Dove Attia and Albert Cohen. Melissa Mars played the role of Aloysia for 346 shows for around 1.5 million spectators, resulting in three NRJ Music Awards, a diamond record (over 700,000 sales), and a 3D movie filmed by FX guru Mark Weingartner (The Matrix, Inception).

She appeared in the Super Bowl spot for From Paris with Love alongside John Travolta. Five more American feature films followed in less than a year, in which she starred alongside the likes of Vivica A. Fox (Kill Bill), Tom Sizemore (Saving Private Ryan), David Proval (Mean Streets, The Sopranos), and Vinnie Jones (Snatch, X-Men).

In November 2014, Mars role in The Cabining garnered a Best Supporting Actress Award at the FANtastic Horror Film Festival in San Diego, California.

She made her American TV debut on Lifetime in Deadly Delusions, a thriller alongside Haylie Duff (Napoleon Dynamite) and Teri Polo (Meet the Parents, The Fosters).

Her series of Children of China portraits was exhibited in Paris for a month during Children's Day, printed on canvas, and measuring nearly six feet long.

== Discography ==
=== Studio albums ===
- 2003: Et alors! (Polydor, #104 France)
- 2005: La Reine des abeilles (Polydor, two versions)
- 2007: À la recherche de l'amour perdu (Polydor, #93 France)
- 2009–2010: Mozart, l'opéra rock, cast musical studio album (Warner, #2 in France)

=== EPs ===
- 2006: Remixes (including Apocalips)
- 2011: Et je veux danser (single and remixes)
- 2011: Just Only Wanna Dance (single and remixes)
- 2014: Tweet N' Roll (single and remixes)
- 2016: I Will Rise (single and remix)

=== Singles ===
Year	Title	Album
2000	"T'am – Tam"	(single)
2000	"Qu'Elles Aillent Se Faire Voir"	(single)
2003	"Papa M'Aime Pas" (#70 France)	Et alors!
2003	"Et Alors!"	Et alors!
2003	"Quelqu'un"	Et alors!
2005	"And ... I Hate You"	La Reine des abeilles
2005	"Dans Ma Bulle Antisismique"	La Reine des abeilles
2006	"Apocalips"	La Reine des abeilles
2006	"1980" (duet with Pascal Obispo) (#3 Belgique, #5 France, #43 Suisse)	Les Fleurs du bien
2007	"Love Machine" (#93 France)	À la recherche de l'amour perdu
2007	"Horror Movies"	À la recherche de l'amour perdu
2008	"Et Si Nous 2" ((feat. Pascal Obispo)	À la recherche de l'amour perdu
2009	"Army of Love"	À la recherche de l'amour perdu
2010	"Digital" feat Riot in Paris	(single)
2011	"Et Je Veux Danser"	
2011	"Just Only Wanna Dance"	Just Only Wanna Dance E.P
2012	"Week-End Love", duet with Dogwalker	(single)
2014	"Beautiful" (Coca-Cola Music)	52 Songs of Happiness Vol. 1
2014	"Tweet n' Roll"	
2016	"I Will Rise"	Curse of Mesopotamia soundtrack

=== Collaborations ===
- 2002: Garonne, she performs 4 songs in Garonne TV miniseries soundtrack
- 2005: Les Homéricains, duet with Lara Fabian, released on Lara Fabian 9
- 2006: La Machine, duet with Pascal Obispo, released on Les Fleurs du Bien (#5 in France)
- 2006: 1980, duet with Pascal Obispo, released on Les Fleurs du Bien (#5 in France)
- 2006: Les Frôleuses, duet with Louis Bertignac
- 2007: Eden Log, she performs on 2 tracks of the movie Eden Log's soundtrack
- 2009: Mozart, l'opéra rock, musical studio album (#2 in France)
- 2010: Digital, Duet with Riot in Paris
- 2012: Week-end Love, duet with Dogwalker
- 2012: Je reprends ma route, with 40 other French artists, they record the single for the children's organisation Les voix de l'enfant
- 2012: Dead Flower, she composes the score for the short movie Glimpse, and performs the closing credits song.
- 2014: Staying Alive, she records the closing credits song for the movie The Cabining
- 2016: I Will Rise, she records the closing credits song for the movie Curse of Mesopotamia

== Filmography ==
- 1996: Titane, by Daniel Moosmann
- 1998: Locked-in Syndrome, by Isabelle Ponnet (short subject)
- 1998: Le Rire du bourreau, by Elsa Chabrol (short subject)
- 1999: Virilité et autres sentiments modernes, by Ronan Girre
- 2000: P.J. on France 2, by Gérard Vergez (TV series)
- 2001: Un aller simple, by Laurent Heynemann
- 2002: Garonne (TV series directed by Claude d'Anna, in which she also sings the title song)
- 2010: From Paris with Love, by Pierre Morel
- 2010: Mozart, l'opéra rock, filmed-in-3D version of the musical
- 2013: Glimpse, by Daryl Ferrara (short movie)
- 2013: My Cage, de Guillaume Campanacci (short movie)
- 2014: The Cabining, by Steve Kopera (multi-awarded horror comedy)
- 2015: Sorrow, by Millie Loredo, starring Vannessa Vasquez
- 2015: Assassin's Game, by Anoop Rangi, Lionsgate Digital, starring Tom Sizemore, Vivica A. Fox
- 2015: Lost Angelas, by Ana Maria Manso & William Wayne - in post-production
- 2016: Six Ways To Die, by Nadeem Soumah, eOne, starring Vinnie Jones, Dominique Swain
- 2016: Curse of Mesopotamia, by Lauand Omar (first international movie shot in Iraq)
- 2016: Virtual Revolution, by Guy-Roger Duvert (multi-awarded science fiction movie)
- 2018: Puzzled, by Michael Bergmann, original comedy series pilot
- 2018: Deadly Delusions, by Nadeem Soumah, movie for Lifetime, starring Haylie Duff, Teri Polo...
- 2018: The Letter Red, by Joston Theney, modern adaptation of Macbeth

== Awards ==
- Nomination: Best ensemble cast in « Virtual Revolution » @ First Glance Film Festival
- Best supporting actress in « The Cabining » @ the Fantastic Horror Film Festival 2014, San Diego, CA
- Best Ensemble Cast in « Mozart The Rock Opera » @ NMA 2010, FR
