= El Rodeo de San Antonio =

- City
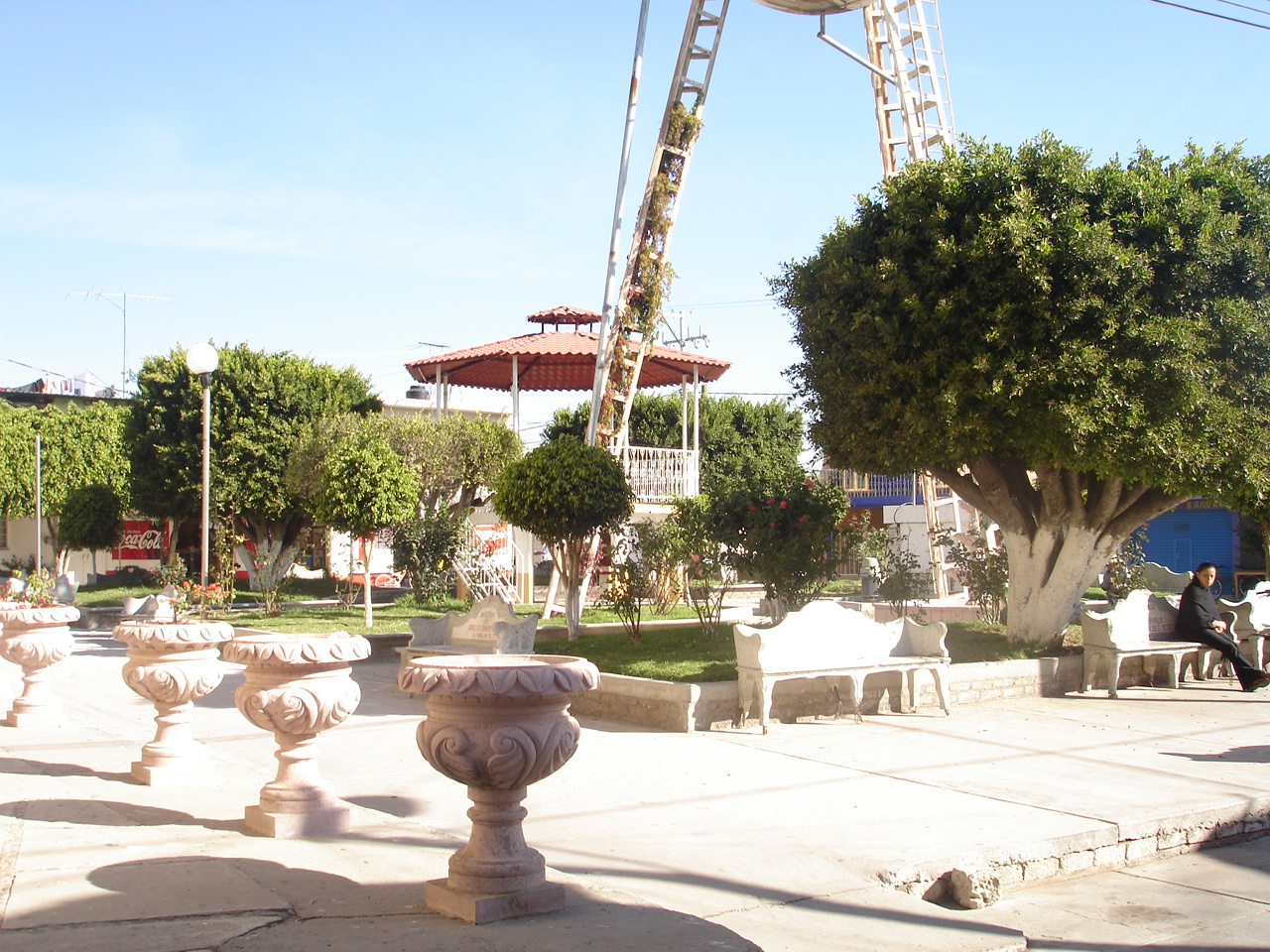
- Photo of the Main Plaza in El Rodeo

- Flag Seal
- Nicknames: El Rodeo, Heroes de Chapultepec
- Interactive map of El Rodeo de San Antonio
- Coordinates: 20.312218°N 101.505029°W
- Country: Mexico
- State: Michoacán
- [County]: Jose Sixto Verduzco
- Incorporated: November 1920

Government
  - Mayor: Bulmaro Calderon Chavez
  - Sheriff: Manuel Lopez Alonzo
  - Secretary: Jose Gutierrez Gonzalez
  - Treasurer: Jose Adalberto Gutierrez Avila

Area
  - Total: 10.5 km^{2} (4.1 sq mi)
  - Land: 10.5 km^{2} (4.1 sq mi)
- Elevation: 1,690 m (5,540 ft)

Population (2010)
  - Total: 1,596
  - Density: 152/km^{2} (390/sq mi)
- Time zone: UTC-6 (CST)
- ZIP Code(s): 58541
- Area code: [438]
- FIPS code: MX16
- GMI Code: MEX-MDO
- Website: http://www.michoacan.gob.mx/

El Rodeo de San Antonio is a city located in the state of Michoacán, Mexico. This community belongs to the municipality of José Sixto Verduzco and is located between the borders of the state of Michoacán and Guanajuato. El Rodeo is formally known as Heroes de Chapultepec but it is popularly known as El Rodeo de San Antonio. The town is home to more than 2000 residents. However, another 4500 people currently have immigrated to the United States.

== Population ==
This town has more than 1500 permanent residents and 3000 temporary residents. The inflow and outflow of people stays around 1000 per year to and from the United States.

== Immigration ==
About 50% of all the population has immigrated to the United States. From the percentages that immigrates, 20% currently reside in California and the other 80% resides in other parts of the United States. The percentage always varies but the mean always stays within the same range.

== Notable businesses ==
- Paleterias "Michoacana"("Michoacana" Popsicles) - The paleteria business is perhaps the most recognized and profitable business in this town. The town is one of the original places where the "Michoacanas" Paleterias' roots first started. Combined, all paleterias business' owners in this town make more than $10 million in profits per year in profit. This business has also grown internationally specially in the western, eastern, and a few mid-west United States cities.
