= Tombé pour elle =

Single by Pascal Obispo

from the album Un jour comme aujourd'hui
- B-side: "Ma consolation"
- Released: 1995
- Recorded: 1994
- Genre: Pop
- Length: 4:06
- Label: Epic, Sony Music
- Songwriter(s): Pascal Obispo
- Producer(s): Pascal Obispo, François Delabrière

Pascal Obispo singles chronology
"69%" (1994)	"Tombé pour elle" (1995)	"Tu compliques tout" (1996)

"Tombé pour elle" is a 1994 song recorded by French singer and composer Pascal Obispo. Written by Obispo who also composed the music, it was produced by Obispo and François Delabrière. Released in September 1995 as the lead single of the album Un jour comme aujourd'hui, the song achieved success in France where it peaked at number 12 for four weeks and remained on the top 50 for 22 weeks. In 1998, the song was performed during the singer's first tour and included in the album Live 98. In addition, it was released as a live single, but poorly charted. The song was included in the singer's 2013 best of album Millésimes.

"Tombé pour elle" is a tribute to the region in which Obispo spent his holidays in his childhood. In the lyrics he mentions two cities and an island of the Gironde department (Arcachon, Cap-Ferret, the Île aux Oiseaux), which he calls "my house, my Eiffel Tower [...] my Tower of Babel, my light, my stronghold".

== Track listings ==
- CD single
1. "Tombé pour elle (L'ile aux oiseaux)"
2. "Ma consolation"
- CD single
1. "Tombé pour elle" (live version)
2. "Mon avion t'attend"

== Charts and sales ==
=== Peak positions ===
Chart (1995)	Peak position
France (SNEP)	12
Chart (1996)	Peak position
Belgium (Ultratop 50 Wallonia)	37
Chart (1998)	Peak position
Belgium (Ultratop 50 Wallonia)	40
France (SNEP)	80

=== Year-end charts ===
Chart (1995)	Position
French Singles Chart	43
