= Rodéo (riot) =

Type of riot in France

The rodéo was a technique of rioting that became popular in France beginning in 1981 that was often associated with youth of North African descent and the Les Minguettes area of Vénissieux, a Lyon suburb.

Over the summer of 1981, 250 cars were stolen and burned in government housing projects of Marseille, Lyon, Roubaix, Nancy and Paris. The riots consisted of stealing cars, driving them in tight circles and ultimately burning them. Some reports indicate the cars were stolen from more prosperous areas and taken to depressed neighborhoods to be burned to lure police to those areas for street battles.
