= Axel Bauer =

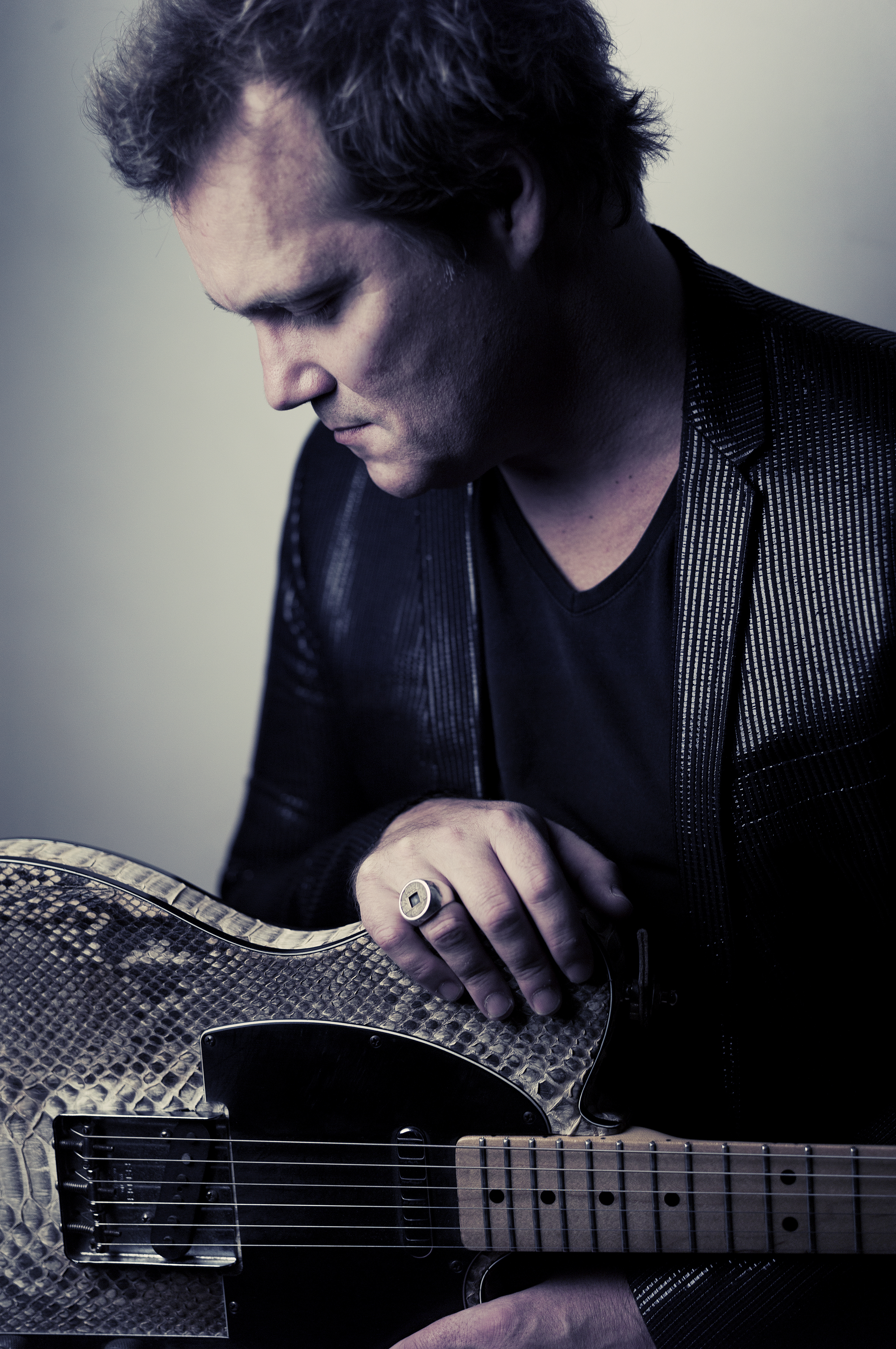

Background information
- Born: 7 April 1961 (age 65); Paris, France
- Genres: Rock; pop
- Occupations: Singer; guitarist; songwriter; actor
- Instruments: Vocals; guitar
- Years active: 1980–present
- Labels: Mondio Music; EMI; Mercury; Universal; Polydor; Acceleration
- Website: axelbauer.com

Axel Bauer (born 7 April 1961) is a French singer, composer, guitarist, and actor, born in Paris. A figure of the French rock scene, he was discovered in 1983 with the song "Cargo". Several times awarded a gold record, he has sold three million records and performed nearly 700 concerts in France and Europe.

== Music career ==
=== "Cargo" ===
He submitted his demos to Philippe Missir, artistic director of Mondio Music, who accompanied him in the elaboration of the "Cargo" demo on which Michel Eli, the director of the label immediately signed Bauer. The song came out at the end of 1983 with Manu Katché on drums and Bauer on guitar. Michel Eli, who wrote the lyrics, was inspired by film Pépé le Moko (1937) with Jean Gabin. The cover of the single refers to the poster of the film Querelle (1982) by Rainer Werner Fassbinder. "Cargo" sold more than a million copies, earning a Gold record for Bauer. The song was covered by Roger Daltrey in 1987 under the title « take me home ».

Bauer chose to work with the director Jean Baptiste Mondino on a video for the song. The video was shot in black and white, populated by muscular sailors in engine rooms and a nude girl dancing, inspired by Francis Ford Coppola's film Rumble Fish (1983) and Fritz Lang's film Metropolis (1927). "Cargo" was the first French video to be broadcast on MTV.

=== "Éteins la lumière" ===
The following year, he became the first French artist to sign at EMI international. He settled in London and began recording his debut album with director Dave Bascomb, producer of Tears for Fears. The album Les nouveaux Seigneurs was released in 1987.

After a few years spent in the UK, Axel left EMI, returned to Paris and signed with Mercury (Universal). In 1990, Sentinelles was released, produced by Ben Rogan (Polnareff, Daho, Sade). It was considered an unpolished blending of disparate genres such as rock and electro with multiple collaborations, with the song "Éteins la lumière" becoming a success and being certified gold record. The song remains notable for its guitar riff. Axel then left for a long tour with musicians such as bassist Phil Spalding, on guitar Pierre Jaconelli or drummer Mathieu Rabaté.

=== Simple mortel ===
Simple mortel, his third album, was released in 1998. However, Bauer's record company found the album to be out of format, with the songs too long for the radio and although having received a good reception in the press, they did not promote it.

=== "À ma place" ===
Axel worked with his guitarist Juan Tamayo on "Mens moi" and the bassist Arnaud Giroud of Emigrates for his next album.

After listening to some demos with French artist Zazie, they got really deep by writing a song called "À ma place". Zazie wrote the lyrics, Axel composed the music and both sung. A song with compelling energy and emotion that won an enormous success, selling nearly 600,000 copies, was nominated for the Victoires de la musique and won an NRJ music Award. The album became a golden record with 170,000 copies sold.

À ma place" was not included on Zazie's studio album, but only on Bauer's Personne n'est parfait on which it appears in an extended version, then on Bauer's best of La Désintégrale (2003).

In 2003, the live version performed during Zazie's tour was added on her live album Ze live!! and in the collector edition of La Désintégrale. The song, as well as the music video (on the DVD), were also available on Zazie's 2008 greatest hits Zest Of.

Invited by Zazie, he joined the troupe of the "Restos du cœur". Triumphing at the Olympia in 2002, he created the surprise entering the stage with a string orchestra and electro-rock musicians.

=== Bad Cowboy ===
In 2003 released his first best of, La désintégrale.

In 2006 he signed with Polydor, worked on Bad Cowboy produced by Dan Presley (The Breeders). With Franck Pilant on guitar with whom he started the album's composition and pre-production, Drummer Geoff Dugmore (Killing Joke, Johnny Hallyday), bassist and former boxer Gabriel Barry. The album was recorded live in Ireland at Grouse Lodge Studios. For the video of "Tu me Tues" Axel, Gabriel and Franck incarnated a band of urban cowboys penetrating the city on horseback in search of their alter egos.

At the same time, he left Universal and became producer. In 2010, he participated in the opera rock Dracula composing the single "in trance ... ylvanie" with singer of BB Brunes, Adrien Gallo. End of 2010, again with Zazie, they perform a new duet: Double Axel.

=== Peaux de serpent ===
In 2013, Axel Bauer launched Peaux de serpent.

=== Live à Ferber ===
Live à Ferber is a live album released in June 2017 recorded live at the Ferber Studio in Paris. The album includes some of his greatest hits started in 2013. The videos of the recordings were released on Bauer's YouTube channel.

== On the side ==
=== Sahara desert ===
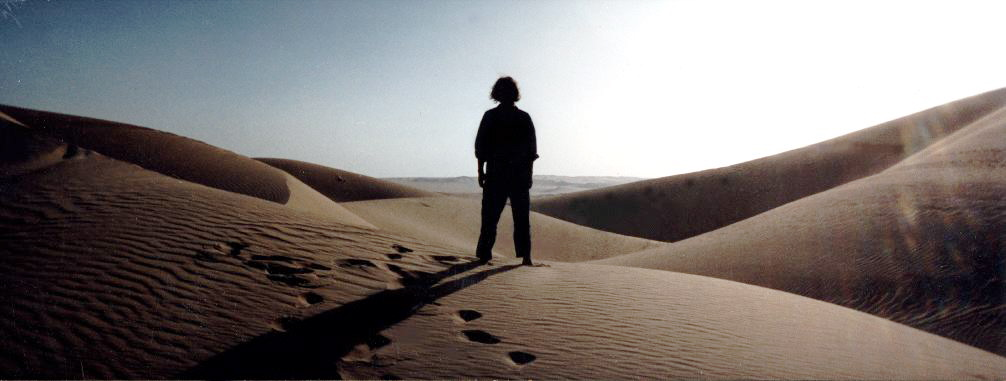

Having become a star at a young age, Axel feels the need to refocus and find himself. In the early 1990s, with his friend and bassist Laurent Griffon, they went to the Sahara desert to experience an ascetic life. an immersion in the Tuaregs of the Ténéré world. In the school of life, lost in the immensity of the desert, he realizes that there is nothing in this world where one is very small.

Upon his return, he composed "Nomade" and "00 Zen", and works with director Steve Forward.

=== GAM - IAO ===
Mid 2000s he identified a real need to put artists at the center of negotiations with producers. Together with Kent, Issam Krimi and Suzanne Combeaud they set up the GAM (the guild of the artists of the music) of which he is made president. Many artists respond to the call. He then participate actively in the Lescure and Pheline missions and the GAM will be a signatory of the Schwartz agreements. In 2015, the GAM is at the initiative of a worldwide organisation called IAO (International artist organisation)

=== Knighted ===
For his career and his commitment, the Minister of Culture Aurélie Filipetti made him Knight of the Order of arts and Letters.

=== Collaborations ===
- Cover of I'm so alone for the album tribute to Johnny Thunder
- Duo with Florent Pagny for the song "Terre" (Album "2")
- Dutronc's cover "Fais pas ci fais pas ça" for "Ma chanson d’enfance".
- Restos du cœur from 2002 to 2006
- Sol en Si albums and concerts.
- Album "Autour du blues 2" cover of "Red house" by Jimi Hendrix.
- Composed and directed for Johnny Hallyday, on the album "À la vie à la mort", the title "J'ai rêvé de vous"
- Composed and made tracks for Dick Rivers
- Composed and produced the title "Pense à nous" for the singer Julie Zenatti
- Composed the music of the first single of the musical Dracula "In transe-ylvannie"
- Participates and sings in duet with Gérard Manset on the album "un oiseau s'est posé".
- Composed with Alex Frican the music of the emission In the secrets with Cécile de Ménibus.
- Sing for the children's book The school of fables where he plays the song of the little monkey.
- In 2015 he was invited to "Autour de La guitare" where world greatest guitarists played his songs.

== Music style and equipment ==
Axel Bauer plays mainly on Fender Stratocaster and Telecaster. It is his L series that is heard on the solo of "Cargo" and on the riff of éteins la Lumière.

== Personal life ==
In 1991, Bauer had a son, Jim, with singer and actress Nathalie Cardone.

Bauer wrote a biography titled "Maintenant tu es seul".

== Discography ==
=== Studio albums ===
- Les nouveaux seigneurs (1987, EMI)
- Sentinelles (1990, Mercury)
- Simple mortel (1998, Mercury)
- Personne n'est parfait (2000, Mercury)
- Bad Cowboy (2006, Polydor)
- Peaux de serpent (2013)
- Live à Ferber (2017)
- Radio Londres (2022)

=== Compilation albums ===
- La désintégrale (2003, Mercury)

=== Singles ===
- "Cargo" (1983)
- "Phantasmes" (1984)
- "Jessy" (1987)
- "Le jardin sauvage" (1988)
- "Laura" (1988)
- "L'arc-en-ciel" (1989)
- "Métamorphosis" (1990)
- "Maria" (1990)
- "Éteins la lumière" (1991)
- "Laisse venir" (1998)
- "Personne n'est parfait" (2001)
- "À ma place" (2001)
- "Mens-moi" (2001)
- "Réveille-toi" (2003)
- "Tu me tues" (2006)
- "Souviens-toi" (2013)
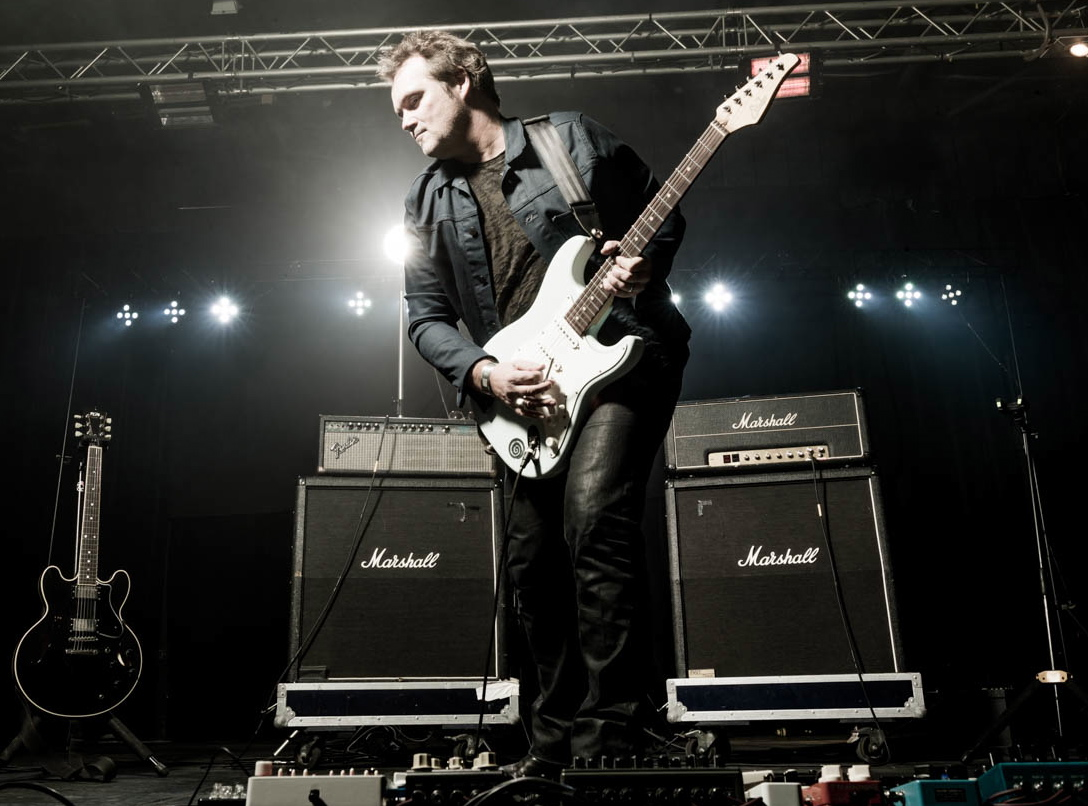

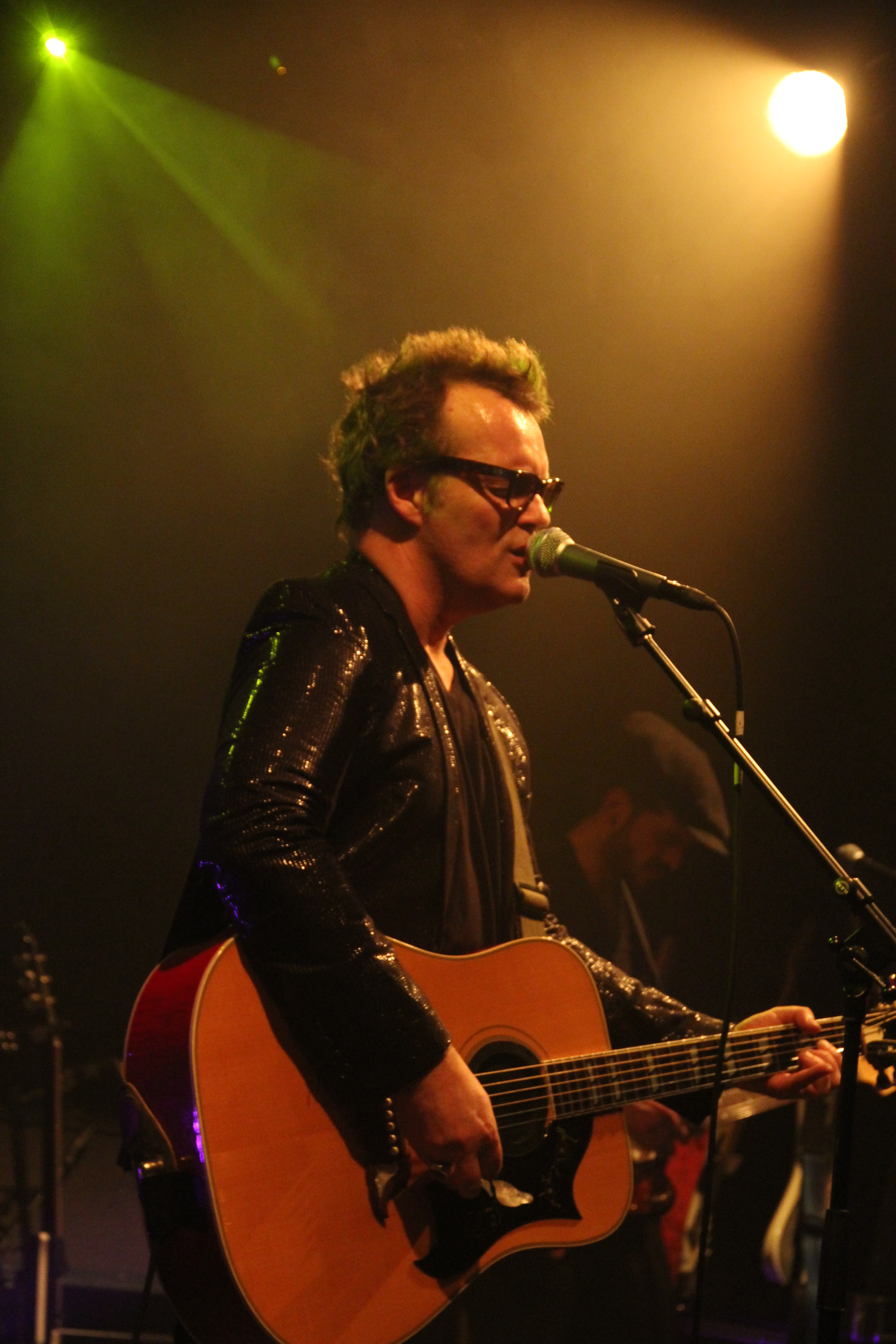

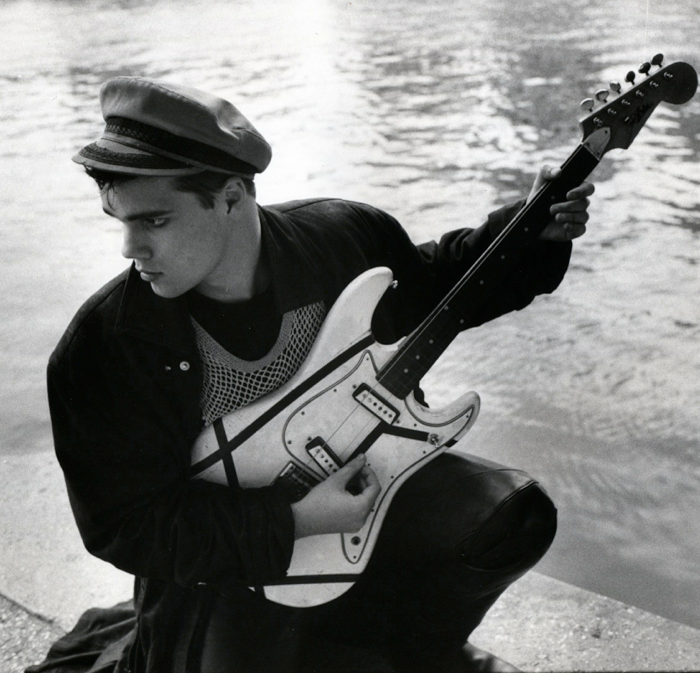
