= Fan (Pascal Obispo song) =

Single by Pascal Obispo

from the album Fan
- B-side: "L'Amour avec toi"
- Released: 14 March 2003
- Genre: Pop
- Length: 4:30
- Label: Epic, Sony Music
- Songwriter(s): Lionel Florence, Pascal Obispo
- Producer(s): Pascal Obispo, Pierre Jaconelli, Volodia

Pascal Obispo singles chronology
"So Many Men" (2002)	"Fan" (2003)	"Zinedine" (2003)

"Fan" is a 2003 song recorded by French singer and composer Pascal Obispo. Written by Lionel Florence who had previously worked for many notable artists, the song is a tribute to great artists, particularly Michel Polnareff. Released on March 14, 2003, as the lead single of the album of the same name, "Fan" achieved great success in France and Belgium (Wallonia), becoming to date Obispo's first number-one hit and his most successful single in terms of chart peak positions. The song was also performed during the singer's next tours and was thus included on the albums Studio Fan / Live Fan (2004) and Les Fleurs de Forest (2007).

The CD single was released in many editions with various art cover showing Obispo portraying many artists such as Robert De Niro, Freddie Mercury and Marilyn Monroe. In France, the single went straight to number-one on 1 June 2003, and almost didn't stop to drop the weeks after, totalling eight weeks in the top ten, 18 weeks in the top 50 and 27 weeks in the top 100.

== Track listings ==
- CD single
1. "Fan" — 4:30
2. "L'Amour avec toi" — 2:32
3. "Fan" (video) — 4:30
- CD maxi - Format 25 x 25
1. "Fan" — 4:30
2. "L'Amour avec toi" — 2:32
3. "Fan" (video) — 4:30

+ a poster - collector

- Digital download
1. "Fan" — 4:30
2. "Fan" (2004 live) — 4:26
3. "Fan" (2007 live) — 5:01
- CD single - Promo - Format 12"
1. "Fan" — 4:30

== Charts and sales ==
=== Peak positions ===
Chart (2003)	Peak position
Belgian (Wallonia) Singles Chart	1
French SNEP Singles Chart	1
Swiss Singles Chart	15

=== Year-end charts ===
Chart (2003)	Position
Belgian (Wallonia) Singles Chart	25
French Singles Chart	20
Swiss Singles Chart	69

=== Certifications ===
Region	Certification	Certified units/sales
Belgium (BRMA)	Gold	25,000^{*}
France (SNEP)	Gold	250,000^{*}
^{*} Sales figures based on certification alone.
