= Rodéo (Zazie album) =

Studio album by Zazie
- Released: 22 November 2004
- Recorded: November 2003
- Genre: Pop
- Length: 48:57
- Label: Mercury; Universal Music

Zazie chronology
| Ze Live (2003) | Rodéo (2004) | Rodéo Tour (2006) |

Singles from Zen
- 1. "Rodéo" Released: 2004; 2. "Toc, Toc, Toc" Released: 2004; 3. "Excuse-moi" Released: 2004; 4. "Oui" Released: 2004

Rodéo is a 2004 album recorded by French pop singer Zazie. It was her fifth studio album and her seventh album overall. It was released on 22 November 2004 and achieved success in francophone countries. It provided four singles, but all of them were only released as promotional singles and therefore did not chart.

== Background and release ==
For the first time, Zazie co-wrote all the songs on the album with the composers Jean-Pierre Pilot and Philippe Paradis.

The album was recorded at a house in the Luberon in November 2003. It was released in two editions : a standard edition and an edition including a bonus track, "Mon coeur à la science", and a DVD. This DVD contains the music videos for ten songs of the album presented under a 40-minute film entitled "Rodéo indien". As the title indicates it, this film was shot in India, by Didier Le Pêcheur, who had already produced other music videos for Zazie. This DVD is also composed of a making-of and an Indian remixed version of the songs "Tous des anges", "Un point c'est toi" and "Zen".

== Chart performance ==
In France, the album went straight to number two, its peak position, on 21 November 2004. It dropped on the chart and totaled nine weeks, 21 weeks in the top 50 and 70 weeks in the top 200. In Belgium (Wallonia), it debuted at No. 7 on 4 December 2004 and reached a peak of number two for four consecutive weeks. It remained in the top 100 for 45 weeks. In Switzerland, the album was charted for nine weeks and achieved No. 45 in its four weeks, on 26 December 2004.

== Track listings ==
All lyrics are written by Zazie; all music is composed by Zazie, Jean-Pierre Pilot, and Philippe Paradis^{1}.

Rodéo – Standard edition
| No. | Title | Length |
|---|---|---|
| 1. | "La dolce vita" | 4:49 |
| 2. | "J'aime, j'aime pas" | 3:50 |
| 3. | "Excuse-moi" | 3:26 |
| 4. | "Toc toc toc" | 3:26 |
| 5. | "La Pluie et le Beau Temps" | 3:46 |
| 6. | "Lola majeure" | 3:09 |
| 7. | "Rodéo" | 3:58 |
| 8. | "Slow" | 4:08 |
| 9. | "Doolididom" | 4:52 |
| 10. | "Sauver le monde" | 4:12 |
| 11. | "Oui" | 4:25 |
| 12. | "J'arrive/Ghost" | 8:24 |
| Total length: | | 52:25 |

^{1}Tracks 3, 7, 8, 10, and 12 are credited in the order: Zazie, Philippe Paradis, Jean-Pierre Pilot.

Rodéo – Collector Edition (CD+DVD)
| No. | Title | Length |
|---|---|---|
| 6. | "Mon cœur à la science" (Bonus track) | 3:27 |
| 7. | "Lola majeure" | 3:09 |
| 8. | "Rodéo" | 3:58 |
| 9. | "Slow" | 4:08 |
| 10. | "Doolididom" | 4:52 |
| 11. | "Sauver le monde" | 4:12 |
| 12. | "Oui" | 4:25 |
| 13. | "J'arrive/Ghost" | 8:24 |
| Total length: | | 56:02 |

DVD – From Collector Edition (CD+DVD)
| No. | Title | Length |
|---|---|---|
| 1. | "Le film" |
| 2. | "Making of" |
| 3. | "Mumbai remix" (music video) |
| 4. | "La Dolce Vita" (music video) |
| 5. | "Doolididom" (music video) |
| 6. | "Excuse-moi" (music video) |
| 7. | "J'arrive" (music video) |
| 8. | "Lola majeure" (music video) |
| 9. | "Oui" (music video) |
| 10. | "La pluie et le beau temps" (music video) |
| 11. | "Rodéo" (music video) |
| 12. | "Slow" (music video) |
| 13. | "Toc Toc Toc" (music video) |

== Credits and personnel ==
- Musicians : Angel Luis Cabrera, Philippe Desbois and Bruno Le Roux
- Acoustic guitar and bass : Nicolas Fiszman
- Kalimba : Jean-Pierre Pilot
- Keyboards : Philippe Paradis and Jean-Pierre Pilot
- Guitar : Philippe Paradis
- Assistant : Ted Hall
- Mixing : Yves Jaget
- Programming : Jean-Pierre Pilot and Philippe Paradis
- Backline technician : Éric Salmon
- Photo and design : Laurent Seroussi

== Release history ==
| Date | Label | Region | Format |
|---|---|---|---|
| 22 November 2004 | Mercury | Belgium, France, Switzerland | CD |
| 6 December 2004 | Mercury | Belgium, France, Switzerland | CD + DVD |
| 2006 | Mercury | Belgium, France, Switzerland | CD |

== Charts ==
| Chart (2004–05) | Peak position |
|---|---|
| Belgian (Wallonia) Albums Chart | 2 |
| French SNEP Albums Chart | 2 |
| Swiss Albums Chart | 45 |

| Year-end chart (2004) | Position |
|---|---|
| Belgian (Wallonia) Albums Chart | 23 |
| French Albums Chart | 33 |
| Year-end chart (2005) | Position |
| Belgian (Wallonia) Albums Chart | 30 |
| French Albums Chart | 60 |

== Certifications and sales ==
| Region | Certification | Certified units/sales |
|---|---|---|
| France (SNEP) | Platinum | 300,000^{*} |
^{*} Sales figures based on certification alone.
