= Pascal Obispo =

French singer, producer and songwriter (born 1965)

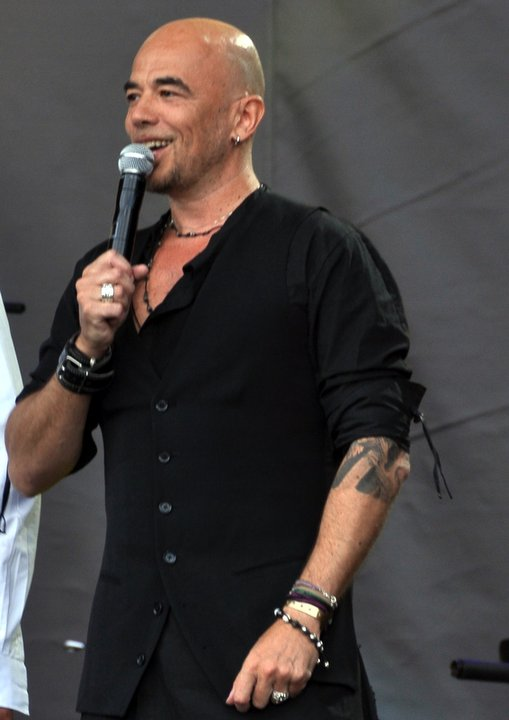
- Obispo performing on stage in Paris on Bastille Day 2011

Background information
- Born: Pascal Michel Obispo; 8 January 1965 (age 61); Bergerac, Aquitaine, France
- Genres: Pop, rock, progressive rock
- Occupations: Singer, songwriter, producer
- Years active: 1990–present
- Label: Epic Records
- Website: pascalobispo.com

Pascal Michel Obispo (French pronunciation: [paskal miʃɛl ɔbispo]; born 8 January 1965) is a French pop and rock singer, music producer and songwriter.

== Early life ==
Pascal Obispo, son of Max Obispo (a former Bordeaux Girondins football player of Basque origin) and Nicole Guérin (originally from Angers), was born on 8 January 1965 in Bergerac. After the divorce of his parents in 1978, he was raised by his mother, who decided to settle in Rennes. His father Max gained some notoriety by publishing two books, one on football, and Le Sable d'Ararat in 2010, a novel born from a meeting with the Armenian Minister of Culture Hasmik Boghossian when he discovers the similarities between the Armenian and Basque languages.

== Career ==
Pascal Obispo started singing in 1980. He got his first record deal in 1990. The record deal was Le long du fleuve. Some of his most famous songs are "Plus que tout au monde", "Laurelenn", "Tombé pour elle", "L'important c'est d'aimer", "Personne" and "Fan".

With his 2007 release of Les Fleurs du Bien (a play on Baudelaire's Les Fleurs du mal) he makes allusions to Rosa Parks, Pablo Picasso and others. He is also well known for his various escapades, his unconservative behavior, his haircut, etc. His name is an anagram of painter Pablo Picasso's name.

Obispo used his popularity to help with charity work and particularly for fighting the spread of HIV/AIDS. He has worked with many other well-known artists such as Jean-Jacques Goldman, Florent Pagny, Johnny Hallyday, Patricia Kaas, Amel Bent, and Natasha St-Pier.

=== 1980s ===
In the beginning of the 1980s Rennes was one of the cities of rock in France. While studying at the Lycée Émile-Zola, Pascal found his passion for music, after discovering the group The Cure in rehearsal next to the basketball court where he was playing. He also fell in love with the Rennes rock group Marquis de Sade.

In 1983, while he was in Terminale interne at the free institution of Combrée, he created the group Words Of Goethe with friends from his former high school in Rennes (notably the lyricist Alain Gaudiche). After his military service, between January and August 1986, he was the bassist of the new wave group Evening Legions.

In 1988, he joined the new wave group Senso, which consisted of the members Frank Darcel (a former member of the Marquis de Sade group) and Frédéric Renaud. Originally a bass player, Pascal later became the singer of the project.

=== 1990s ===
At the turn of the 1990s, the Senso group prepared a first album but, after discussion, decided to make it Pascal Obispo's first solo album. The disc, entitled Le Long du Fleuve, was released in 1990 by EMI with songs written by Franck Darcel, and supported by the single Les avions se souvenir. The album went unnoticed.

In 1991, Pascal Obispo signed his first artist contract with Epic and published his second album (Plus que tout au monde) in 1992, which met with real success thanks to the single of the same name and the title Tu vas me manquer, which placed 16th in the Top 50.

At the end of 1994, he released the album Un jour comme today, confirming his success with titles like Tombé pour elle and Tu compliques tout, and revealing the influence of Michel Polnareff (from whom he took over Holidays) and the Beatles. The album sold over 500,000 copies.

In 1995, he met Lionel Florence, with whom he wrote the credits for the TF1 series Sous le soleil. The same year, he took advantage of his growing fame to get involved in the fight against AIDS, around the album Entre sourires et larmes, with six titles signed by Lionel Florence.

In early 1996, he opened for Celine Dion for 13 dates, including four at Bercy. He then released his 4th album, Superflu. Thanks to the titles Il faut du temps, Lucie, Où et avec qui tu m'aimes? and the duo Les Meilleurs Enemies with Zazie, he reached a very large audience, allowing the album to exceed one million sales.

In 1997 he began collaborating with other artists. In November, he worked with Florent Pagny on his album Savoir aimer, which reached 2 million sales. The following year, he produced Johnny Hallyday's album, Ce que je sais (including the song Allumer le feu). Then, with Lionel Florence, he wrote Sa raison d'être, a song bringing together 42 artists on the same song for the benefit of the fight against AIDS. This compilation reaches 700,000 sales and brings in more than 45 million francs to ECS, of which he is an honorary member of the board of directors.

On July 28, 1997, during an outdoor concert in Ajaccio, a 19-year-old man shot him with a pellet gun and injured him in the face (he left a scar on his left eyebrow).

After publishing the album Live 98, from his Superflu tour, he produced the album Le mot de passe by Patricia Kaas in 1999, and participated in the production of several titles for Florent Pagny's new album, RéCréation. In December, he released his 5th studio album, Soledad, which totaled 700,000 sales, carried by the titles Soledad, L'important c'est d'aimer, Tue par amour, Pas besoin de regrets and Ce qu'on voit Allée Rimbaud.

=== 2000s ===
Pascal Obispo worked for almost a year on the release of the album of the musical Les Dix Commandements, which premiered in October at the Palais des sports in Paris. In December, he composed Noël Ensemble, bringing together 112 artists for the benefit of the fight against AIDS (600,000 copies sold). That same year on April 4, he married Isabelle Funaro in Paris. His son Sean was born a few months later, on October 11, inspiring the title Millésime. In 2001, he was voted "male artist of the year" at the NRJ Music Awards.

In 2002, he produced the album De l'amour le mieux by Natasha St-Pier (including the duo Tu definables) which reached more than 750,000 sales and was certified Platinum in France. He then went on to collaborate on several of the singer's following albums, performing with her another duet, Mourir demain, which became a great success.

In 2004, his 6th album, Studio Fan - Live Fan, was released, a double album which pays tribute in particular to Michel Polnareff. The Fan Tour, which brought together more than 500,000 spectators, allowed him to receive his first Victoire de la Musique in a personal capacity, that of "Musical show, tour or concert of the year" (in 2001, the title L'Envy to love that he composed for The Ten Commandments won the "Victory for Original Song of the Year").

On May 15, 2006, he released his 7th album, Les Fleurs du bien, which included the songs Rosa and 1980 (with Melissa Mars), among others. In January 2007, he took the pseudonym of Vitoo for a song with Fatal Bazooka, Mauvaise foi nocturne (No. 1 in the Top 50), a parody of the duo Confessions nocturnes by Diam's and Vitaa. In June, he resumed the role of Vitoo for his song Le Chanteur ideal.

In 2007, he released the single Nouveau voyage (C'est la vie), featuring American rapper Baby Bash, which ranked 10th best selling singles.

In February 2009, the singer offered two concerts, at the Olympia theater in Arcachon, all of the proceeds from which went to benefit oyster farmers in the Arcachon basin and to the reconstruction of the forest massif (following the storm in January 2009). On April 16, 2009, he launched his web radio on the digital radio station GOOM, where he broadcasts his titles freely.

In April 2009, he took the pseudonym "Captain Samouraï Flower" and published the album Welcome to the Magic World of Captain Samouraï Flower, which met with mixed success.

=== 2010s ===
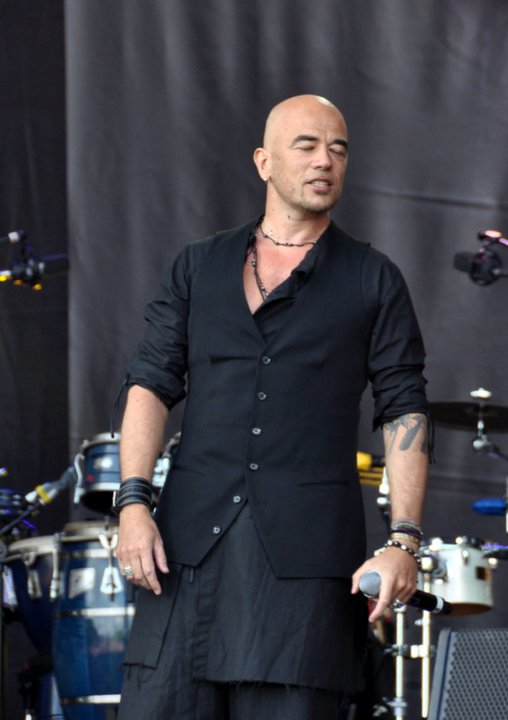
Obispo onstage in 2011

In June 2010, Pascal Obispo embarked on the production of the musical Adam and Eve: La Seconde Chance. Its objective is to create a modern and poetic musical show, which speaks of love and music to generations born with the web. Performances of the show took place from January 31, 2012, to March 25, 2012, at the Palais des Sports in Paris, but the tour scheduled for September was cancelled.

In January 2013, the best of Millésimes was released, celebrating and retracing its twenty years of success, supported by two unreleased titles, Tu m'had dit and Comment-vous que je t'aime, and a new tour, the Millésimes Tour.

In September 2013, the single D'un Ave Maria was released, taken from the album Le Grand Amour, which was released on December 224 and was certified double platinum.

In February 2016, the album Billet de femme was published, the texts of which are taken from the collections Romance and Pauvres fleurs by the poet Marceline Desbordes-Valmore.

In December 2016, Pascal Obispo unveiled the single La bonne nouvelle, taken from his musical show Jesus, from Nazareth to Jerusalem, which evokes the last three years of Jesus' life. Performances begin on October 17, 2017, at the Palais des Sports in Paris. A tour throughout France then takes place from February to April 2018.

In 2018, he was a coach in the 7th season of The Voice: La Plus Belle Voix. The same year, he played himself in the film La Ch'tite Famille by Dany Boon.

=== 2020s ===
Pascal becomes a coach during the ninth season of The Voice, he goes on to win the edition in 2020 with Abi Bernadoth.

During the COVID-19 Pandemic in France in 2020, he composed the music for the title Pour les gens du rescue on a text by Marc Lavoine. Florent Pagny accompanies them on vocals. All royalties are paid to the Fédération hospitalière de France and the Fondation des Hôpitaux de France28.

In June 2020, his new single I counted sort.

In January 2021, he launched his own Obispo All Access music app, available on the App Store and Google Play, giving access to his entire catalog, unreleased tracks and interviews.

== Personal life ==
Pascal Obispo has a child named Sean, whom he had in 2000 with Isabelle Funaro and for whom he wrote his song Millésime.

In February 2008, he began a relationship with the singer Jenifer. After a somewhat chaotic romance, the two artists separated in February 2009.

On 26 February 2008, he saved the life of Nicolas Lacambre, a young motorcyclist who had just been hit by a hit-and-run driver. Pascal Obispo saw the accident happen in the distance. When he arrived at the scene, he called emergency services and carried the victim and his severed arm to the side of the road to avoid any further accidents. He drove off as soon as emergency services arrived, to avoid making the front page of the magazines. It was the gendarmes who informed Nicolas Lacambre of the identity of his saviour. They finally met a year and a half after the events, at the end of a Girondins de Bordeaux match, and became friends. This episode remained secret for 11 years, until the publication of Nicolas Lacambre's book "On n'est pas seul sur Terre" and Pascal Obispo's single of the same name.

He got married on 19 September 2015 to model Julie Hantson at the Notre-Dame-des-Flots church in Cap Ferret. The couple divorced in 2022.

=== Charity work ===
Obispo has been a member of the Les Enfoirés charity ensemble since 1997.

== Discography ==
- Millésimes (2013)

== Musicals ==
- 2000: Les Dix Commandements – Music: Pascal Obispo, Book and Lyrics: Lionel Florence and Patrice Guirao
- 2012: Adam et Ève : La Seconde Chance – musical at the Palais des Sports in Paris, France.
