= The Voice: la plus belle voix season 4 =

The Voice: la plus belle voix
- Season 4
- Hosted by: Nikos Aliagas; Karine Ferri
- Judges: Florent Pagny, Jenifer, Mika, Zazie
- Winner: Lilian Renaud

Release
- Original network: TF1
- Original release: January 10 – April 25, 2015

Season chronology
- ← Previous; Season 3 Next → Season 5

The Voice: la plus belle voix (season 4) is the fourth season of the French reality singing competition, created by media tycoon John de Mol. It was aired from 10 January 2015 to 24 April 2015 on TF1.

One of the important premises of the show is the quality of the singing talent. Four coaches, themselves popular performing artists, train the talents in their group and occasionally perform with them. Talents are selected in blind auditions, where the coaches cannot see, but only hear the auditioner.

Three of the coaches continued from season 3, namely were Florent Pagny, Jenifer and Mika. But the fourth coach Garou from seasons 1, 2 and 3 was replaced by singer Zazie being the first season for judging in the show. Lilian Renaud was the fourth season winner with finale held on April 24, 2015, marking Zazie's first win as a coach and the first female coach to win a season. Anne Sila from Team Florent Pagny was the runner-up.

== Overview ==
List of contestants by coach
Zazie	Mika	Jenifer	Florent Pagny
Lilian Renaud; Suny; Yoann Launay; Julien; Léa Tchéna; Aubin Talbi; Nehuda; Neeskens; Fergessen; Mathilde; Estelle Mazzillo; Alvy Zamé; Guilhem Valayé; Samira Brahmia; Tom; Nina; M'aile	Law'; Jacques Rivet; Yassine Jebli; Thomas Kahn; Hiba Tawaji; Andrew; Madeleine Leaper; Sharon Laloum; Quentin Bruno; Jeremy Charvet; Dalia Chih; Nög; Indigo; Lorenza; Greg Harrison; Camille Lellouche	Battista Acquaviva; Côme; Manon Palmer; Sweet Jane; Diêm; Johanna Serrano; Rany Boechat; Eugénie O'Mey; Max Blues Bird; Julie Gonzalez; Victoria Adamo; Théo Road; Robinne Berry; Amélie Piovoso; Fabien Cornelius; Devi	Carole-Anne Gagnon-Lafond; Awa Sy; Gaëlle Birgin; Maliya Jackson; Olympe Assohoto; Guillaume Etheve; David Thibault; Trudy Simoneau; Elvya Gary; Léah Bicep; Ketlyn; Pompom Pidou; Mariana Tootsie; Azania Noah; Giuliana Danzè; Anne Sila; Fanny Mendès

== Results ==
The fourth season is won by Lilian Renaud, finalist of the team Zazie. Zazie become the first female coach to win The Voice. The runner-up, Anne Sila from team Florent Pagny, is the only one female who ranked in second place since the beginning of the show.
