= The Voice: la plus belle voix season 8 =

The Voice: la plus belle voix
- Season 8
- Hosted by: Nikos Aliagas; Karine Ferri
- Judges: Julien Clerc, Jenifer, Mika, Soprano
- Winner: Whitney Marin
- Runner-up: Clément Albertini

Release
- Original network: TF1
- Original release: 9 February – 9 June 2019

The eighth season of The Voice: la plus belle voix was broadcast on 9 February 2019 on TF1. It was also rebroadcast the next day on TFX. It was presented by Nikos Aliagas.

Season 8 began later in the year than the previous seasons of The Voice as Soprano and Jenifer were on tour until May, and were unavailable for filming the live shows. The live segments instead took place between the end of May and the beginning of June.

== Coaches and hosts ==
Out of all coaches from the previous season, only Mika returned. Julien Clerc, Jenifer, and Soprano have been announced as new coaches for Season 8. This is a different line-up of coaches than in its previous seasons. Coaches Pascal Obispo and Zazie from Season 7 were on tour and thus unable to participate in Season 8 as coaches. Coach Florent Pagny had announced at the end of Season 5 that his contract would end in 2018. Jenifer, a Season 8 coach who had served previously, made her comeback after three seasons off. Soprano, who has also worked as a coach in the Kids version, joined the Season 8 group. Julien Clerc replaced Florent Pagny.

== Blind Auditions ==
The final eighteen contestants for the show are chosen through a blind audition process.

This is how it works: As each candidate performs, each coach is seated in a chair facing away from the candidate and toward the audience. The coaches listen to the candidates without being able to see them. If a coach likes what they hear, they press the buzzer in front of them, and their chair turns around to face the stage. This means that the coach wants to support the performer and wants them on their team. If only one coach has turned around by the end of the performance, then the singer joins that coach's team by default. However, if several of the coaches turn around, the performer can choose which team they want to join. For Season 8, a new feature was added whereby a coach was allowed to block another coach of their choice from being able to have a contestant on their team by pressing a different button before the other coach had pressed their buzzer. This feature could only be used once by each coach during the entirety of the blind audition process. By the end of the blind auditions, the coaches had narrowed the number of candidates down to eighteen final contestants.

✔️	Coach hit his/her "I WANT YOU" button
	The artist joins the coach's team (if he/she is the only one to have buzzed)
	The artist joins the coach's team (if they are several to have buzzed)
	The artist is Eliminated
✘	The coach buzzed "I WANT YOU", but was blocked by Julien
✘	The coach buzzed "I WANT YOU", but was blocked by Jenifer
✘	The coach buzzed "I WANT YOU", but was blocked by Mika
✘	The coach buzzed "I WANT YOU", but was blocked by Soprano

=== Episode 1 (February 9) ===
The first episode aired February 1, 2019 on television at 9:00pm. The coaches performed "Laissons entrer le soleli" by Julien Clerc for the opening of the blind auditions, as a nod to the new coach.

Order	Artist	Age	Hometown	Song	Coaches and artists choices			
Order	Artist	Age	Hometown	Song	Julien	Jenifer	Mika	Soprano
1	Gage	42	Montréal, (Québec), Canada	Lionel Richie - All Night Long (All Night)	✔️	✔️	✔️	✔️
2	Alexia	21	Rennes (35)	Alain Souchon - La Ballade de Jim	—	—	—	—
3	Gjon's Tears	20	Gruyère District, Switzerland	Christine and the Queens - Christine	✔️	✔️	✔️	✔️
4	Laureen	18	Vidauban (83)	Serge Gainsbourg - Je suis venu te dire que je m'en vais	✔️	✔️	✔️	✔️
5	Kiara Jones	26	Toulouse(31)	James Brown - I Feel Good	—	—	—	—
6	Clément	24	Bastia (20)	Vianney - Fils à papa	✔️	✔️	✔️	✔️
7	Mayeul	26	Brittany	composition originale du candidat + Imagine Dragons - Believer	—	✔️	—	✔️
8	Agnès	??	Péret (34)	Wolfgang Amadeus Mozart - Air de la Reine de la nuit	—	—	—	—
9	Agathe	26	Toulouse (31)	Etta James - I'd Rather Go Blind	✔️	✘	✔️	✔️
10	Poupie	20	Lyon (69)	G-Eazy x Bebe Rexha - Me, Myself & I	✔️	✔️	✔️	✔️
11	Shaun	24	Gonesse (95)	Céline Dion - Ziggy	✔️	—	✔️	—

=== Episode 2 (February 16) ===
Order	Artist	Age	Hometown	Song	Coaches and artists choices			
Order	Artist	Age	Hometown	Song	Julien	Jenifer	Mika	Soprano
1	Ismail	25	Paris (75)	Muse - Unintended	✔️	✔️	✔️	✔️
2	Virginie	50	Saint-Raphaël (83)	The Greatest Showman - This Is Me	✔️	—	—	✔️
3	Louna	22	Ajaccio (20)	Eminem - Lose Yourself	—	—	✔️	✔️
4	Vay	20	Quarante (34)	Rihanna x Mikky Ekko - Stay	✔️	✔️	✔️	✔️
5	Po & Marina	31-27	Montréal, (Québec), Canada	Lady Gaga - Million Reasons	—	—	—	—
6	Ava Baya	21	Charenton-le-Pont (94)	Édith Piaf - La Foule	✔️	✔️	—	—
7	Sidoine	31	Brussels, Belgium	Niska - Réseaux	—	✔️	✔️	✔️
8	Lisa	20	Nice (06)	Pierre Bachelet - Elle est d'ailleurs	—	—	—	—
9	Arezki	21	Amiens (80)	Nassi – La vie est belle	✔️	✔️	✔️	✔️
10	Mano	42	Tahiti (French Polynesia)	Metallica – Enter Sandman	✔️	—	✔️	—
11	Antso	26	Paris (75)	Tracy Chapman - Talking About Revolution	✔️	—	✘	—
12	Ana Carla	23	Paris (75)	Rihanna - Diamonds	—	✔️	—	✔️

=== Episode 3 (February 23) ===
Order	Artist	Age	Hometown	Song	Coaches and artists choices			
Order	Artist	Age	Hometown	Song	Julien	Jenifer	Mika	Soprano
1	Chérine	23	Antwerp, Belgium	Zazie - Speed	—	—	—	—
2	Maxime Cassady	28	Hyères (83)	Antoine - Les Élucubrations d'Antoine	✔️	✔️	✔️	✔️
3	Ilycia	20	Paris (75)	PNL - À l'ammoniaque	✔️	✔️	✔️	✔️
4	Gilles San Juan	51	Paris (75)	Astor Piazzolla version Grace Jones - I've Seen That Face Before (Libertango)	✔️	—	—	—
5	Clem Chouteau	21	Tours (37)	RY X - Berlin	✔️	✔️	✔️	✔️
6	Albi	18	Lyon (69)	Bigflo et Oli - Dommage	✔️	✔️	✔️	✔️
7	Camille Hardouin	32	Paris (75)	Jacques Brel - Ne me quitte pas	✔️	✔️	—	—
8	Axelle	31	Béziers (34)	Brandi Carlile - The Story	—	—	—	—
9	Hi Levelz	27	Paris (75)	Macklemore x Ryan Lewis - Can't Hold Us	—	✔️	✔️	✔️
10	Léonard	21	Fribourg, Suisse	Toto - Georgy Porgy	✔️	—	✔️	—
11	Coline	17	Doué-la-Fontaine(49)	Sam Smith - Lay Me Down	—	—	—	—
12	Pearl	22	Bordeaux (33)	Coolio - Gangsta's Paradise	—	✔️	—	✔️

=== Episode 4 (March 2) ===
Order	Artist	Age	Hometown	Song	Coaches and artists choices			
Order	Artist	Age	Hometown	Song	Julien	Jenifer	Mika	Soprano
1	Haze	41	Mérignac (33)	Tina Turner - The Best	—	✔️	—	—
2	Clémentine	16	Petersbach (67)	Julien Clerc - Fais-moi une place	✔️	—	✔️	—
3	Yasmine	17	Boé (47)	Camila Cabello x Young Thug - Havana	—	—	—	—
4	Geoffrey	19	Saint-Ouen-l'Aumône (95)	Tom Walker - Leave a Light On	✔️	✔️	✔️	✔️
5	Leona Winter	23	Paris (75)	Malena Ernman - La Voix	✔️	✔️	—	—
6	Mylène	17	-	Calum Scott - Dancing On My Own	—	—	—	—
7	Adrian Byron	67	Caromb (67)	Cat Stevens - Father & Son	—	—	✔️	✔️
8	Sherley	23	Bidos (52)	Lana Del Rey - Blue Jeans (reprise Clara Luciani)	—	✔️	—	—
9	Godi	22	Callian (83)	Orelsan x Stromae - La Pluie	—	✔️	—	✔️
10	Simon	30	Neuville-Saint-Vaast (62)	Renaud - Manu	—	—	—	—
11	Hannah Featherstone	32	Paris (75)	Nina Simone - Feeling Good	—	✔️	✔️	✔️
12	Makja	38	Mérignac (33)	Orelsan - Tout va bien	—	✔️	✔️	—

=== Episode 5 (March 9) ===
Order	Artist	Age	Hometown	Song	Coaches and artists choices			
Order	Artist	Age	Hometown	Song	Julien	Jenifer	Mika	Soprano
1	Valentin	21	Strasbourg (67)	Amy Winehouse - Back to Black	—	✔️	✔️	✔️
2	Whitney	19	Le Vigan (30)	Marshmello x Anne-Marie - Friends	—	—	✔️	✔️
3	Jordan	21	Cannes (06)	Eddy de Pretto - Fête de trop	—	—	—	—
4	Marouen	24	Tunis, Tunisie	Alicia Keys - If I Ain't Got You	—	✔️	—	—
5	Lily Jung	41	Lubine (88)	Chant traditionnel mongol - Jaran Tsagaan Aduu	✔️	✔️	✔️	✔️
6	Claire	28	Saint-Louis (68)	Jane Birkin - Quoi	✔️	✔️	—	—
7	Virginie	29	Bel Air, Mauritius	Pink - Family Portrait	✔️	✔️	✘	✔️
8	Anton	22	Saint-Germain-sur-Meuse (55)	Sinéad O'Connor - Nothing Compares 2 U	✔️	✔️	✔️	—
9	Paul-Alexis	19	Bastia, 2B	Céline Dion - Je sais pas	—	—	—	—
10	Coco	26	Chișinău, Moldova	Eric Carmen - All by Myself, version Céline Dion	✔️	✔️	✔️	✔️
11	Prisca	24	Dreux (28)	The Jackson Five - Blame It on the Boogie	—	—	—	—
12	Alex Adam	29	Guéret (23)	William Sheller - Un homme heureux	✔️	—	—	—

=== Episode 6 (March 16) ===
Order	Artist	Age	Hometown	Song	Coaches and artists choices			
Order	Artist	Age	Hometown	Song	Julien	Jenifer	Mika	Soprano
1	Camille	16	Rueil-Malmaison (Hauts-de-Seine)	Tom Walker - Leave a Light on	—	—	✔️	—
2	Valérie Daure	34	Montréal (Québec) (Canada)	Gloria Gaynor - I Will Survive	✔️	✔️	✔️	✔️
3	Margaux	16	Romorantin (Loir-et-Cher)	Bigflo & Oli - Papa	—	—	—	—
4	David Té	21	Paris	Stromae - Formidable	—	✔️	—	✔️
5	Scam Talk	28	Bordeaux (Gironde)	Childish Gambino - This Is America	✔️	✔️	✔️	✔️
6	Laura Parrado	17	Antibes (Alpes-Maritimes)	Damien Saez - Les enfants paradis	✔️	✔️	—	—
7	Tania	31	Mulhouse (Haut-Rhin)	Consuelo Velázquez - Bésame Mucho	—	✔️	✔️	✔️
8	Anne-Sophie	22	Strépy-Bracquegnies (Belgium)	Minnie Riperton - Loving you	—	✔️	✔️	✔️
9	Tommy	21	Mantes-la-Jolie (Yvelines)	Édith Piaf - Hymne à l'amour	—	—	—	—
10	Estelle	19	Vénissieux (Rhône)	Twenty One Pilots - Heathens	—	✔️	✔️	✔️
11	Théophile Renier	24	Chastre (Belgium)	Maitre Gims - Malheur, malheur	✔️	—	—	—
12	Adrien	27	Paris (75)	Hugh Jackman - The Greatest Show (B.O. de The Greatest showman)	—	—	—	✔️

=== Episode 7 (March 23) ===
Order	Artist	Age	Hometown	Song	Coaches and artists choices			
Order	Artist	Age	Hometown	Song	Julien	Jenifer	Mika	Soprano
1	Petru	24	Bastia, Haute-Corse	Petru Guelfucci - Corsica	✔️	✔️	—	—
2	London Loko	26	Levallois-Perret (Hauts-de-Seine)	Lily Allen - Smile	✔️	—	✔️	—
3	Charlotte	22	Haguenau (Bas-Rhin)	Johnny Hallyday - Les portes de Pénitencier	—	—	—	—
4	Lomany Mauligalo	23	Nouvelle-Calédonie	Seal - Love's Divine	—	—	—	—
5	Loris	18	Rozelieures (Meurthe-et-Moselle)	Julien Clerc - Souffrir par toi n'est pas souffrir	✔️	—	—	—
6	Laure	17	Nice (Alpes-Maritimes)	Whitney Houston - Run to You	✔️	—	✔️	✔️
7	Monstre	21	Paris (75)	Asaf Avidan - One Day (Reckoning Song)	✔️	✔️	✔️	✔️
8	Clacky	24	Avignon (Vaucluse)	Orelsan - Basique	—	✔️	✔️	✔️
9	Max Livio	35	Saint-Jean-de-la-Ruelle (Loiret)	Jacques Brel - Ne me quitte pas	—	—	✔️	✔️
10	Angie Robba	18	Lyon (Rhône)	Images - Les démons de minuit	✔️	✔️	—	—
11	Fanswa	49	Guadeloupe	Chant traditionnel créole guadeloupéen - An Pa Kay	✔️	✔️	✔️	✔️
12	David James Murphy	25	Careil (Guérande) (Loire-Atlantique)	The Beatles - Come Together	—	—	—	—

=== Episode 8 (March 30) ===
Order	Artist	Age	Hometown	Song	Coaches and artists choices			
Order	Artist	Age	Hometown	Song	Julien	Jenifer	Mika	Soprano
1	Pierre Danaë	23	Paris (75)	Chris Isaak - Wicked Game	✔️	✔️	✔️	✔️
2	Léonie	25	Braine-l'Alleud (Belgium)	Stromae - Alors on danse	—	—	—	—
3	Kiumars	29	Luxembourg City (Luxembourg)	Aloe Blacc - I Need a Dollar	—	—	—	—
4	Chloé	20	Saint-Bauzille-de-Putois (Hérault)	Dulce Pontes - Lágrimas	—	—	✔️	✔️
5	Thomas	21	Ferrara (Italy)	Paolo Nutini - Iron Sky	—	✔️	✔️	—
6	Romy	23	La Ciotat (Bouches-du-Rhône)	Jessie J - Do It Like a Dude	—	—	—	—
7	Tiphaine	17	Escautpont (Nord)	Adele - Hometown Glory	✔️	✘	✔️	✔️
8	Ina Ich	44	Dammartin-sur-Tigeaux (Seine-et-Marne)	Rufus & Chaka Khan - Ain't Nobody	—	✔️	—	—
9	Ursula	21	Paris (75)	Sara Bareilles - Gravity	—	Team full	✔️	—
10	Ziia	40	Saint-Pierre (La Réunion)	Sade - Smooth Operator	—	Team full	Team full	—
11	Anto	28	Paris (75)	Europe - The Final Countdown	✔️	Team full	Team full	—
12	Alex	18	Vidauban (Var)	Lomepal - Yeux disent	Team full	Team full	Team full	✔️

== Knockouts (K.O.) ==
The Season 8 rules for knockouts had changed from the rules in previous seasons. Each contestant sang a song of their choice. At the end of the performance, their coach had three options:
a) Send contestant directly to "The Battles" by pressing their button
b) Send contestant to the Danger Zone (Zone Rouge)
c) Eliminate the contestant

Each coach had six spots in Battles. At the end of Knockouts, a coach with remaining spots was allowed to give away the rest of his or her spots to those waiting in Danger Zone. Each coach had two steals which he or she could use on contestants in Danger Zone or on those who had been eliminated.

Color Key

✔️	Contestant has been saved by their coach
✔️	Contestant has been stolen by another coach
	Contestant has been sent to the Danger zone
	Contestant has been eliminated

=== Episode 9 (April 6) ===
Coach	Order	Contetstant	Song	Result	Coaches			
Coach	Order	Contetstant	Song	Result	Julien	Jenifer	Mika	Soprano
Jenifer	1	Ana Carla	"Havana"	Danger Zone	—	—	—	—
Jenifer	2	Poupie	"Always Remember Us This Way"	Advanced	—	✔️	—	—
Jenifer	3	Petru	"Si t'étais la"	Danger zone	—	—	—	—
Jenifer	4	Ilycia	"Price Tag"	Eliminated	—	—	—	—
Jenifer	5	Sidoine	"Samedi soir sur la Terre"	Advanced	—	✔️	—	—
Jenifer	6	Léona Winter	"Louxor j’adore"	Advanced	—	✔️	—	—
Jenifer	7	Ina Ich	"Human"	Eliminated	—	—	—	—
Jenifer	8	Anton	"Salut les amoureux"	Stolen	✔️	—	—	—
Jenifer	9	Tania	"Luchar Por Su Dinero"	Eliminated	—	—	—	—
Jenifer	10	Sherley	"Set Fire to the Rain"	Advanced	—	✔️	—	—
Jenifer	11	David Té	"Russian Roulette"	Eliminated	—	—	—	—
Jenifer	12	Marouen	"Chandelier"	Danger zone	—	—	—	—
Jenifer	13	Anne-Sophie	"Ring My Bell"	Eliminated	—	—	—	—
Jenifer	14	Arezki	"La Valse à mille temps"	Advanced	—	✔️	—	—
Jenifer	15	Angie Robba	"Forever Young"	Eliminated	—	—	—	—
Jenifer	16	Ismail	"Les Moulins de mon cœur"	Danger Zone	—	—	—	—
Jenifer	17	Haze	"Born to be Wild"	Eliminated	—	—	—	—
Jenifer	18	Makja	"Dimanche soir"	Eliminated	—	—	—	—
Danger Zone
Jennifer
Jennifer	1	Ana Carla		Eliminated	—	—	—	—
Jennifer	2	Petru		Saved	—	✔️	—	—
Jennifer	3	Marouen		Stolen	✔️	—	—	—
Jennifer	4	Ismail		Eliminated	—	—	—	—

=== Episode 10 (April 13) ===
Coach	Order	Contetstant	Song	Result	Coaches			
Coach	Order	Contetstant	Song	Result	Julien	Jenifer	Mika	Soprano
Mika	1	Whitney	Whitney Houston - I Will Always Love You	Qualified	—	—	✔️	—
Mika	2	Camille	Slimane - Viens on s'aime	Eliminated	—	—	—	—
Mika	3	Hi Levelz	Cardi B ft. Bad Bunny & J Balvin - I Like It	Danger zone	—	—	—	—
Mika	4	Laure	Jean-Jacques Goldman - Comme toi	Eliminated	—	—	—	—
Mika	5	Gage	Prince - Purple Rain	Eliminated	—	—	—	✔️
Mika	6	Gjon's Tears	Queen ft. David Bowie - Under Pressure	Qualified	—	—	✔️	—
Mika	7	Ursula	Charles Aznavour - Hier encore	Eliminated	—	—	—	—
Mika	8	Agathe	Janis Joplin - Move Over	Danger zone	—	—	—	—
Mika	9	Albi	Michael Jackson - She's Out of My Life	Qualified	—	—	✔️	—
Mika	10	Estelle	Imagine Dragons - Whatever It Takes	Eliminated	—	—	—	—
Mika	11	Hannah Featherstone	Procol Harum - A Whiter Shade of Pale	Danger zone	—	—	—	—
Mika	12	Coco	Ariana Grande - Dangerous Woman	Eliminated	—	—	—	—
Mika	13	London Loko	Julien Doré - Coco Câline	Qualified	—	—	✔️	—
Mika	14	Louna	Diam's - La boulette	Danger zone	—	—	—	—
Mika	15	Mano	Midnight Oil - Beds Are Burning	Eliminated	—	—	—	—
Mika	16	Max Livio	Alain Bashung - La nuit je mens	Eliminated	—	—	—	—
Mika	17	Thomas	LP - Lost on You	Eliminated	—	—	—	—
Mika	18	Clem Chouteau	David Bowie - Heroes	Qualified	—	—	✔️	—
Danger Zone
Mika	1	Gage		Stolen	—	—	—	✔️
Mika	2	Agathe		Eliminated	—	—	—	—
Mika	3	Hannah Featherstone		Eliminated	—	—	—	—
Mika	4	Louna		Saved	—	—	✔️	—

== The Live Shows ==
=== The Voice ===
Type	Day and broadcast time	Average audience		Ranking	References
Type	Day and broadcast time	Number of viewers	PDM	Ranking	References
Blind auditions	Saturday, 9 February 2019 (21h10–23h25)	5,598,000	28.5%	1st	
Blind auditions	Saturday, 16 February 2019 (21h10–23h25)	5,284,000	27.1%	1st	
Blind auditions	Saturday, 23 February 2019 (21h10–23h25)	4,970,000	25.3%	1st	
Blind auditions	Saturday, 2 March 2019 (21h10–23h25)	5 049 000	26%	1st	
Blind auditions	Saturday, 9 March 2019 (21h10–23h25)	5 185 000	27,5%	1st	
Blind auditions	Saturday, 16 March 2019 (21h10-23h35)	5 094 000	26,9%	1st	
Blind auditions	Saturday, 23 March 2019 (21h10–23h25)	4 947 000	27,1%	1st	
Blind auditions	Saturday, 30 March 2019 (21h10–23h25)	4 160 000	23%	2nd	
K.O.	Saturday, 6 April 2019 (21h10–23h25)	4 651 000	24,9%	1st	
K.O.	Saturday, 13 April 2019 (21h10–23h25)	4 202 000	22,2%	1st	
K.O.	Saturday, 20 April 2019 (21h10–23h25)	3 672 000	20,9%	1st	
K.O.	Saturday, 27 April 2019 (21h10–23h25)	3 322 000	16,3%	3rd	
Battles	Saturday 4 May 2019 (21h10–23h25)	3 831 000	20,2%	1st	
Battles	Saturday, 11 May 2019 (21h00–23h35)	3 878 000	20,4%	1st	
Live Shows	Saturday, 18 May 2019 (21h00–23h35)	3 159 000	15,7%	3rd	
Live Shows	Saturday 25 May 2019 (21h00–23h35)	3 313 000	17,4%	2nd	
Live Shows	Saturday, 1 June 2019 (21h100–23h35)	2 577 000	14,5%	2nd	
Live Shows	Saturday, 6 June 2019 (21h100-23h35)		%		

Legend :

Highest audience figures
Lowest audience figures
