= The Voice – La plus belle voix =

Reality singing competition on French television channel TF1

- Created by: John de Mol Jr.; Roel van Velzen
- Directed by: Tristan Carné
- Presented by: Nikos Aliagas (1–); Virginie de Clausade (1); Karine Ferri (2–10); Alessandra Sublet (11); Anaïs Grangerac (14)
- Judges: Coaches: Florent Pagny (1–7, 10–11, All-Stars, 14–15); Jenifer (1–4, 8, All-Stars); Louis Bertignac (1–2); Garou (1–3, 5); Mika (3–8, All-Stars, 13, 16–); Zazie (4–7, All-Stars, 12–13); Matt Pokora (6); Pascal Obispo (7, 9); Julien Clerc (8); Soprano (8); Amel Bent (9–12, 15); Marc Lavoine (9–11); Lara Fabian (9, 15); Vianney (10–14); Nolwenn Leroy (Comeback; 11); Patrick Fiori (All-Stars); Bigflo & Oli (12–13); Camille Lellouche (Comeback; 13); Zaz (14); Patricia Kaas (14); Tayc (15–); Marine (16–); Suzane (16–); Supercoaches: Mika (12); Jenifer (13); Jean-Louis Aubert (14); Co-coaches: Matt Pokora (15); Kendji Girac (15); Louis Bertignac (15); Zazie (15)
- Country of origin: France
- Original language: French
- No. of seasons: 15
- No. of episodes: 225

Production
- Executive producers: Thierry Lachkar; John de Mol
- Production locations: Studio Lendit 3 & 4
- Running time: ca. 2 hours
- Production companies: Endemol Shine France (seasons 1–6); ITV Studios France (season 7–present)

Original release
- Network: TF1
- Release: 25 February 2012 – present

Related
- The Voice Kids France; The Voice (franchise)

The Voice: La plus belle voix (lit. 'The most beautiful voice') is a reality singing competition on TF1. It is France's version of The Voice format created by John de Mol Jr.. The first episode aired on 25 February 2012. It is the second time that the format has been produced in French after the Belgian version The Voice Belgique.

One of the important premises of the show is the quality of the singing talent. Four coaches, themselves popular performing artists, train the talents on their team and occasionally perform with them. Talents are selected in blind auditions, where the coaches cannot see, but only hear the auditioning contestant.

The original panel featured Florent Pagny, Jenifer, Louis Bertignac and Garou; the panel for the upcoming sixteenth season will feature Mika, Marine, Suzane, and Tayc. Other coaches that have appeared in previous seasons include Zazie, Matt Pokora, Pascal Obispo, Soprano, Julien Clerc, Amel Bent, Lara Fabian, Marc Lavoine, Vianney, Bigflo & Oli, Zaz, and Patricia Kaas. Nolwenn Leroy served as a coach for Comeback Stage contestants in the eleventh season. Camille Lellouche was the comeback stage coach for the thirteenth season. The Voice Kids coach Patrick Fiori participated as a coach in the All Stars format of the show.

== Format ==
The series consists of three phases: a blind audition, a battle phase, and live performance shows. Four judges/coaches, all noteworthy recording artists, choose teams of contestants through a blind audition process. Each judge has the length of the auditioner's performance (about one minute) to decide if he or she wants that singer on his or her team; if two or more judges want the same singer (as happens frequently), the singer has the final choice of coach. Another twist is brought to the show, the block. Beside the big red button, each coaches have 3 other buttons which have the name of other coach. If the coach want an artist but doesn't want a rival coaches to get that artist, they can hit the button with the name of the coach that they want to block, it will automatically blocks that other coaches and spin the chair. If the blocked coach choose to turn around, their entire chair lighting will stay red, the "JE VOUS VEUX" text below the chair will not appear and the LED screen toward them will say "BLOQUE" instead, not the coaches name. In season 12, can block another coach at any time, even during their pitch. When a coach is blocked, his/her chair turns back.

Each team of singers is mentored and developed by its respective coach. In the second stage, called the battle phase, coaches have two of their team members battle against each other directly by singing the same song together, with the coach choosing which team member to advance from each of four individual "battles" into the first live round. Within that first live round, the surviving acts from each team again compete head-to-head, with a combination of public and jury vote deciding who advances onto the next round. In the final phase, the remaining contestants (top 8) compete against each other in live broadcasts. The television audience and the coaches have equal say 50/50 in deciding who moves on to the final 4 phase. With one team member remaining for each coach, the final 4 contestants compete against each other in the finale with the outcome decided solely by public vote.

== Development, production and marketing ==
In late 2011 French production company Shine France bought the format and the large national television chains, including TF1 and M6, expressed interest. TF1 eventually won the contract and the format was aired in 2012 as a replacement to the long running Star Academy series.

== Coaches and hosts ==
=== Coaches ===
Seasons
Coach
Coach	1	2	3	4	5	6	7	8	9	10	11	12	13	14	15	16
Florent Pagny																
Jenifer													(Note: Jenifer participated as the "Supercoach" in season 13.)			
Louis Bertignac																
Garou																
Mika												(Note: Mika participated as the "Supercoach" in season 12.)				
Zazie																
Matt Pokora																
Pascal Obispo																
Julien Clerc																
Soprano																
Lara Fabian																
Amel Bent																
Marc Lavoine																
Vianney																
Nolwenn Leroy											C.S.					
Bigflo & Oli																
Camille Lellouche													C.S.			
Zaz																
Patricia Kaas																
Tayc																
Marine																
Suzane																

Notes

Coaches gallery

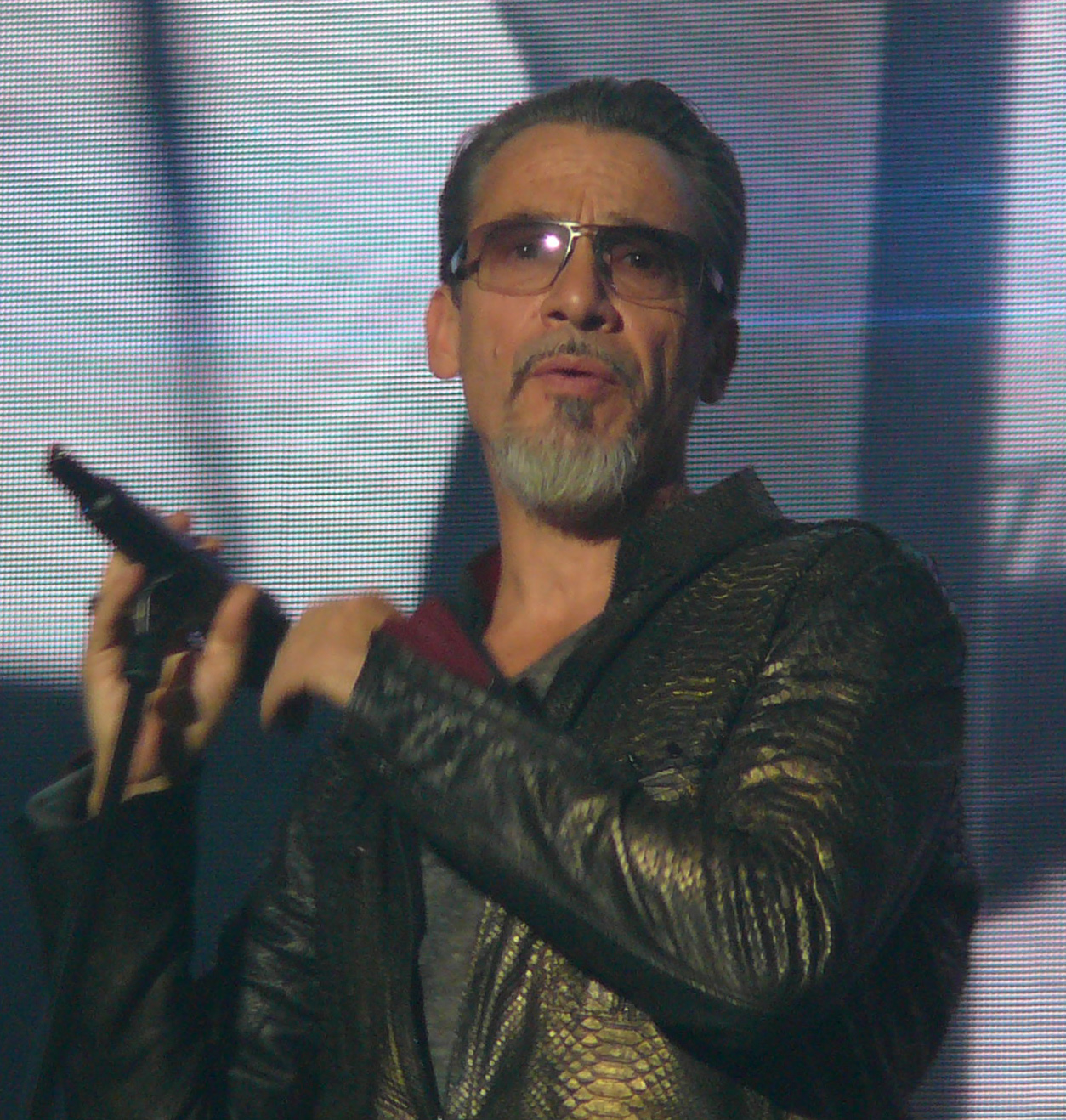
Florent Pagny (1–7, 10–11, 14–15)

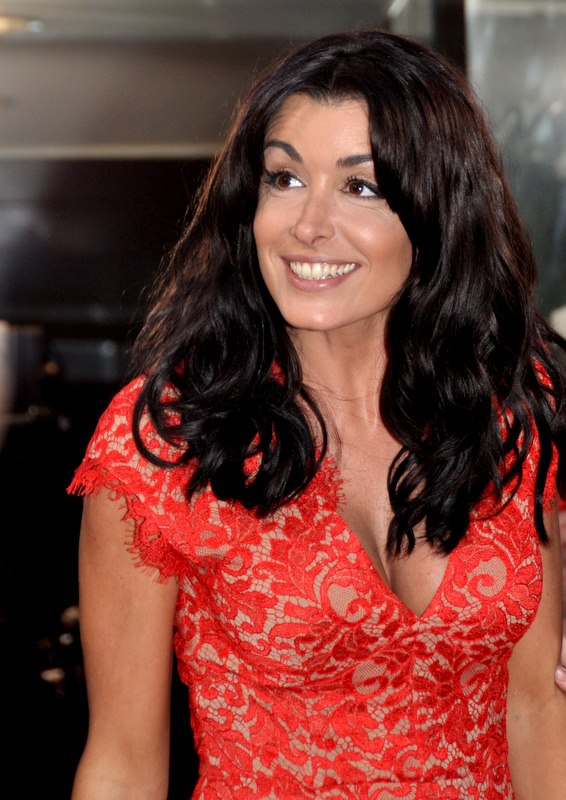
Jenifer (1–4, 8)

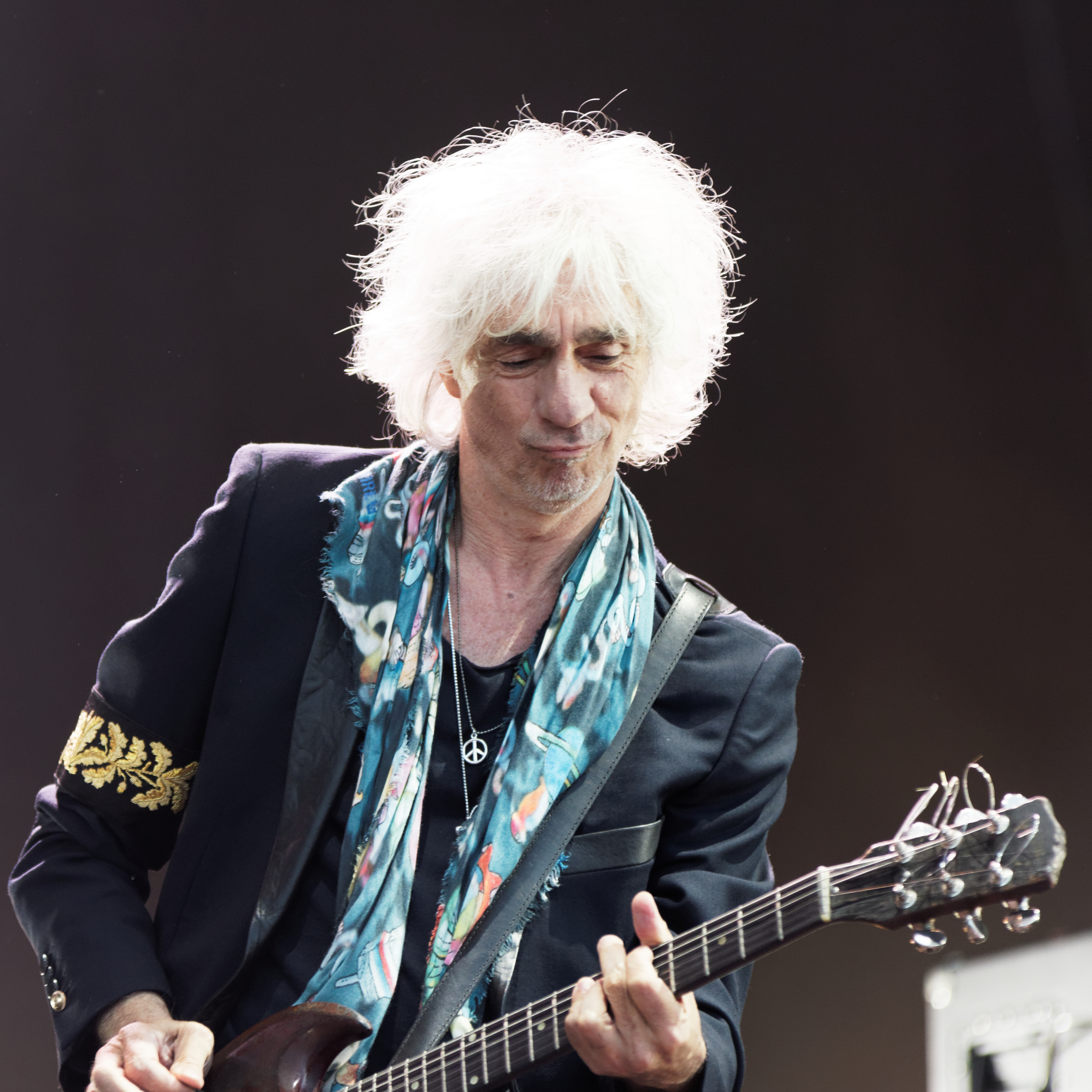
Louis Bertignac (1–2)

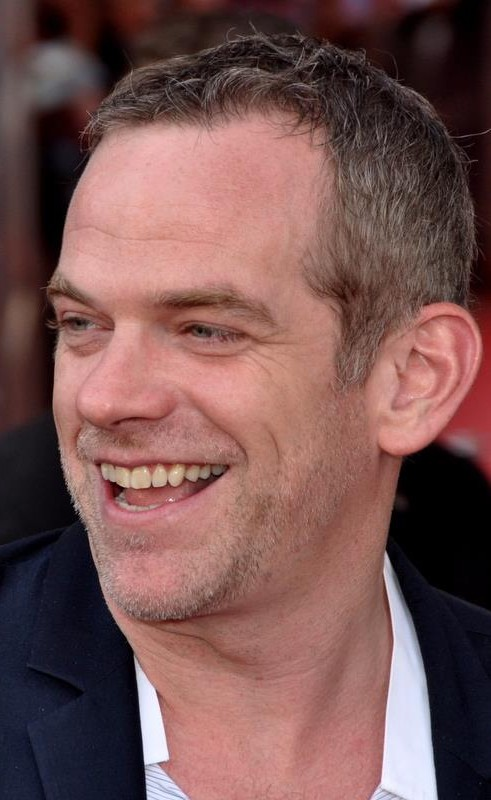
Garou (1–3, 5)

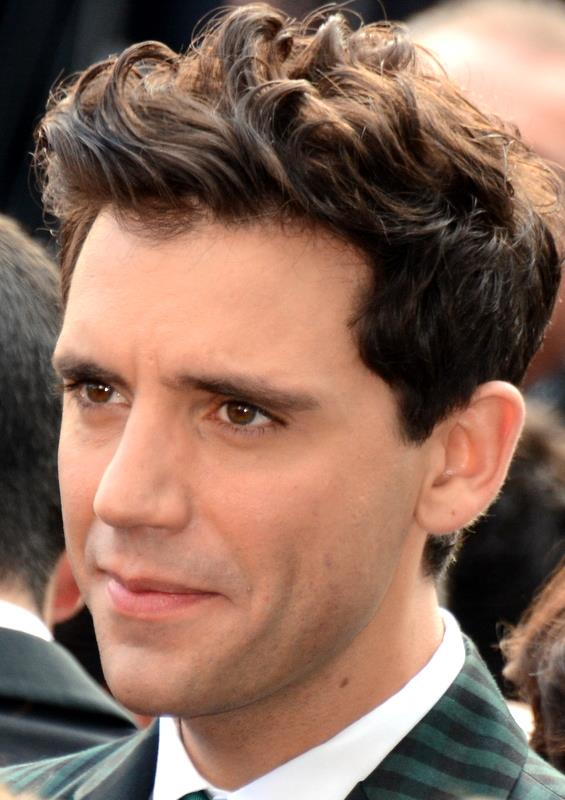
Mika (3–8, 13, upcoming in 16)

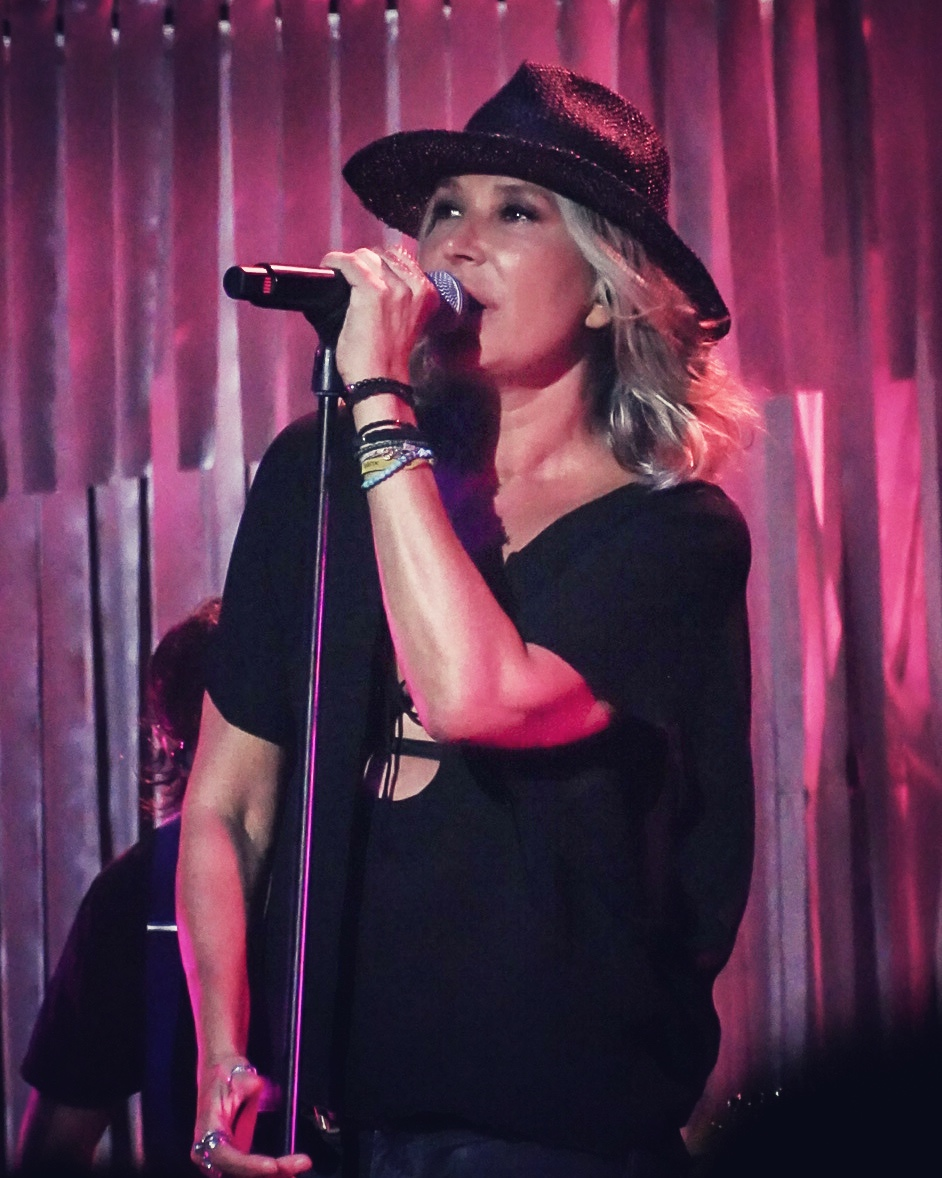
Zazie (4–7, 12–13)

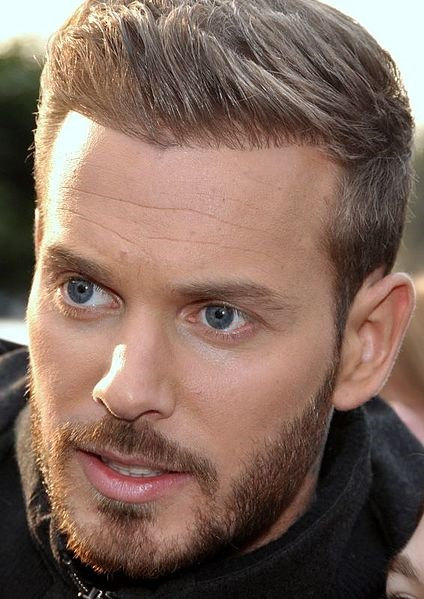
Matt Pokora (6)

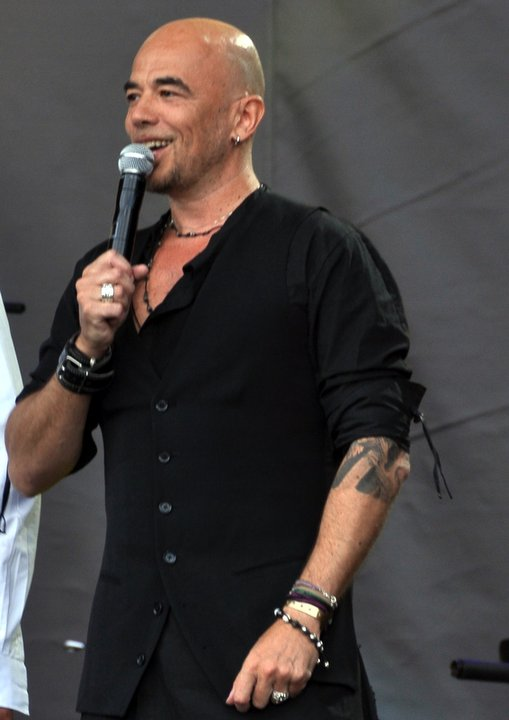
Pascal Obispo (7, 9)

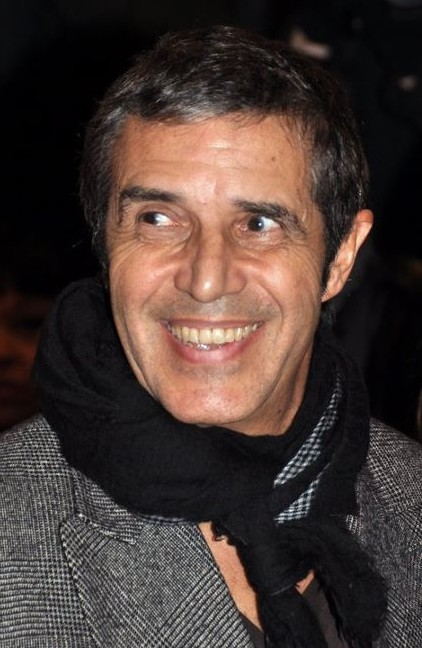
Julien Clerc (8)

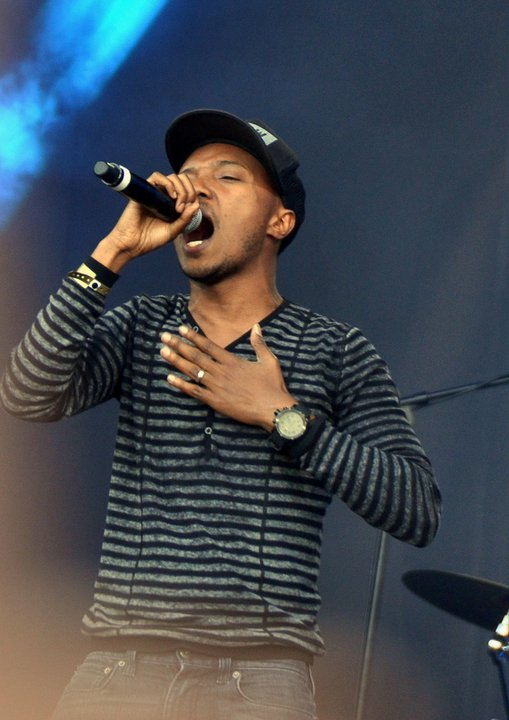
Soprano (8)

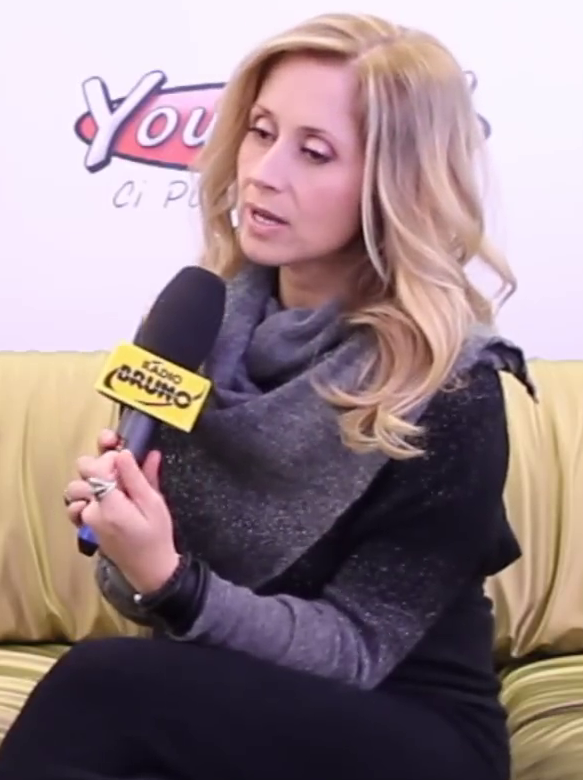
Lara Fabian (9, 15)

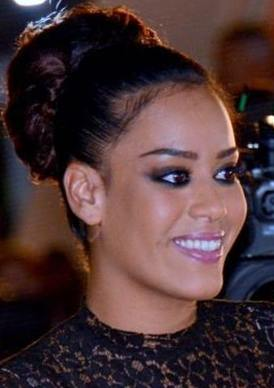
Amel Bent (9–12, 15)

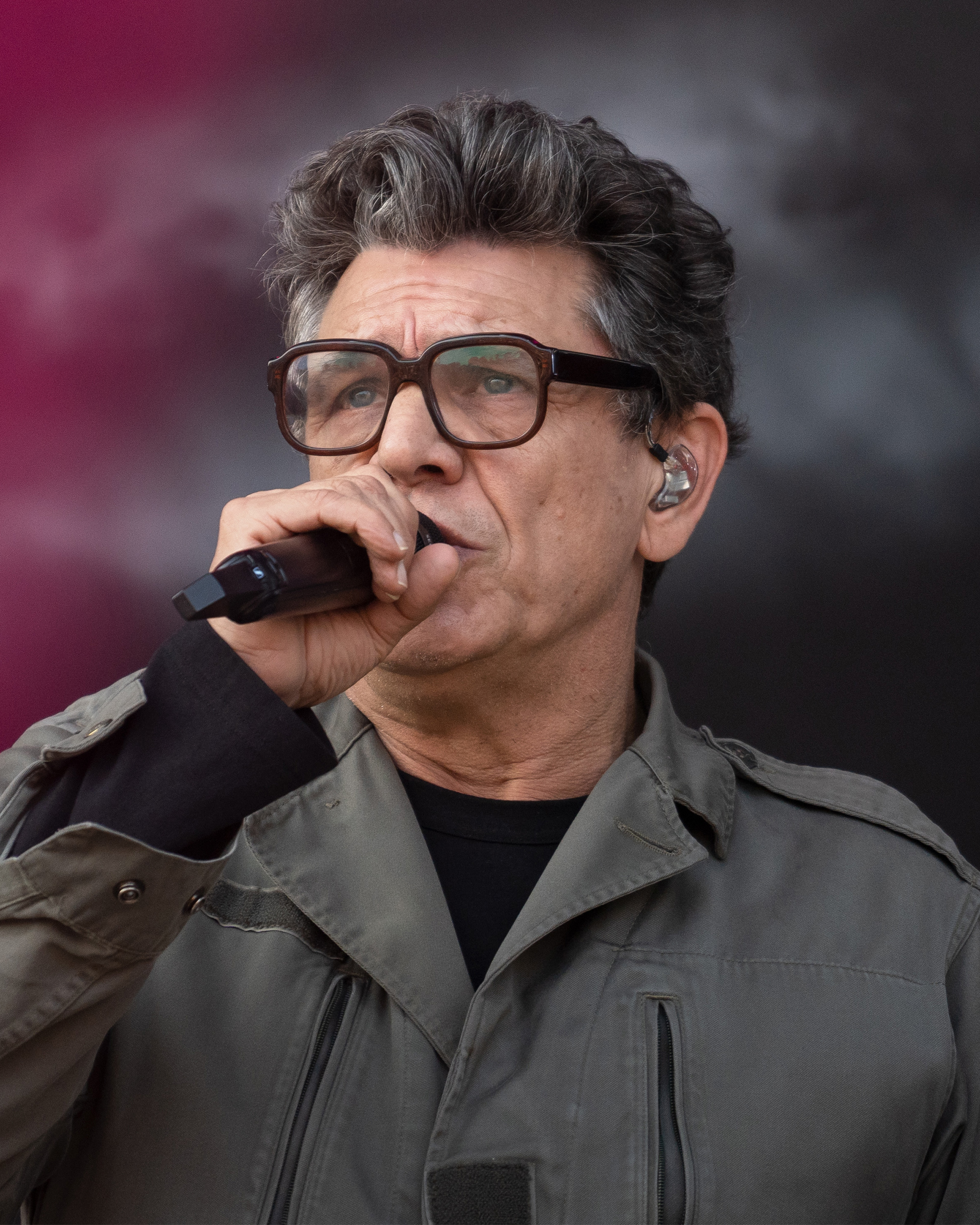
Marc Lavoine (9–11)

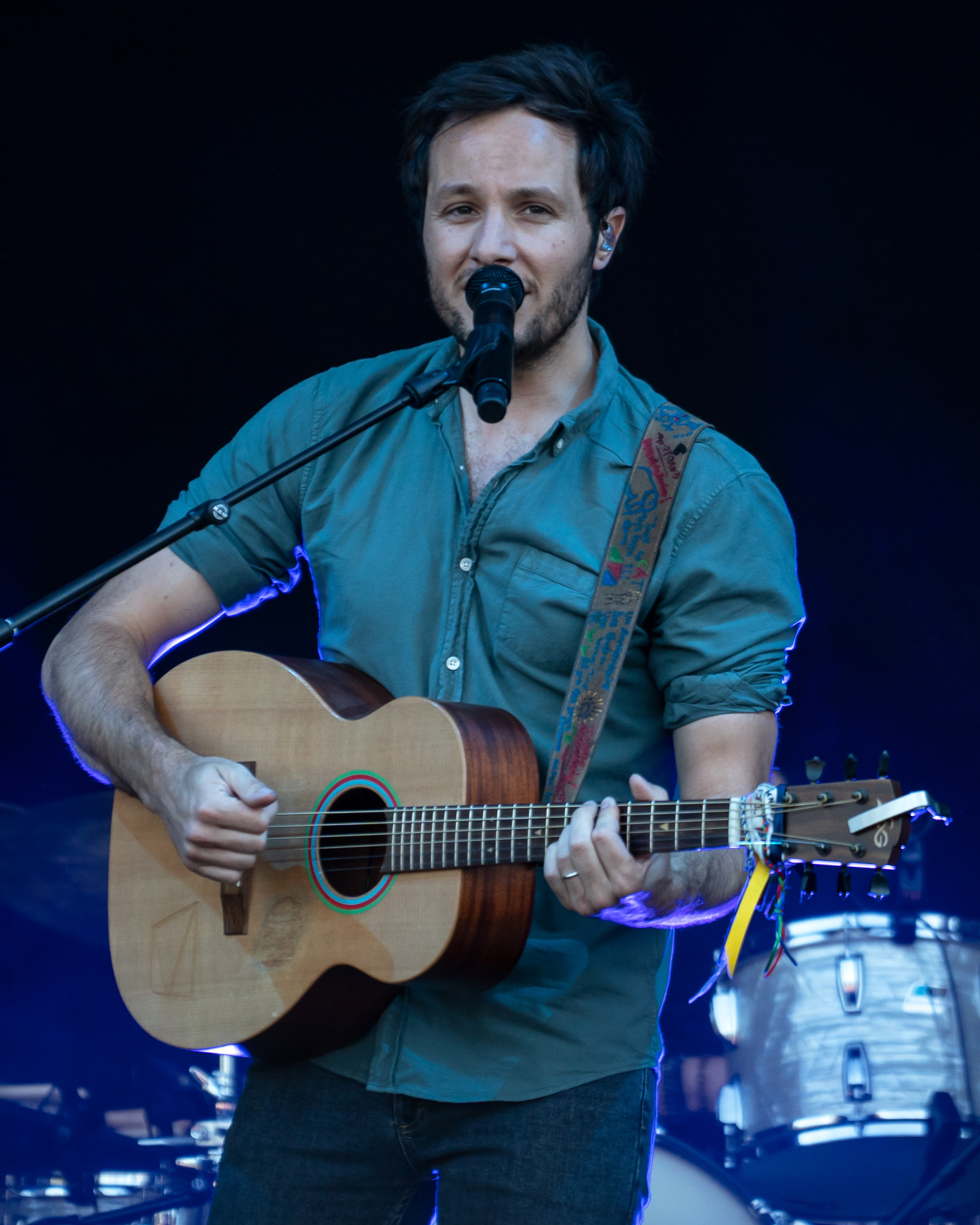
Vianney (10–14)

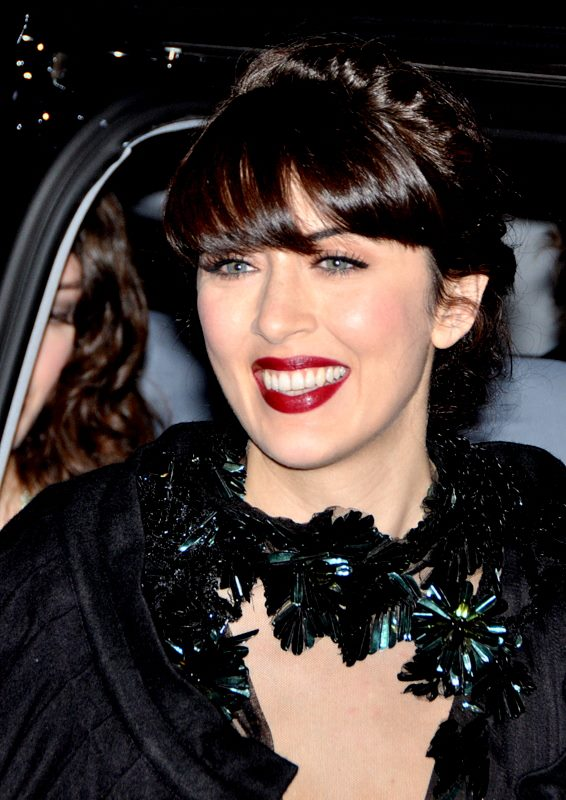
Nolwenn Leroy (Comeback Stage, 11)

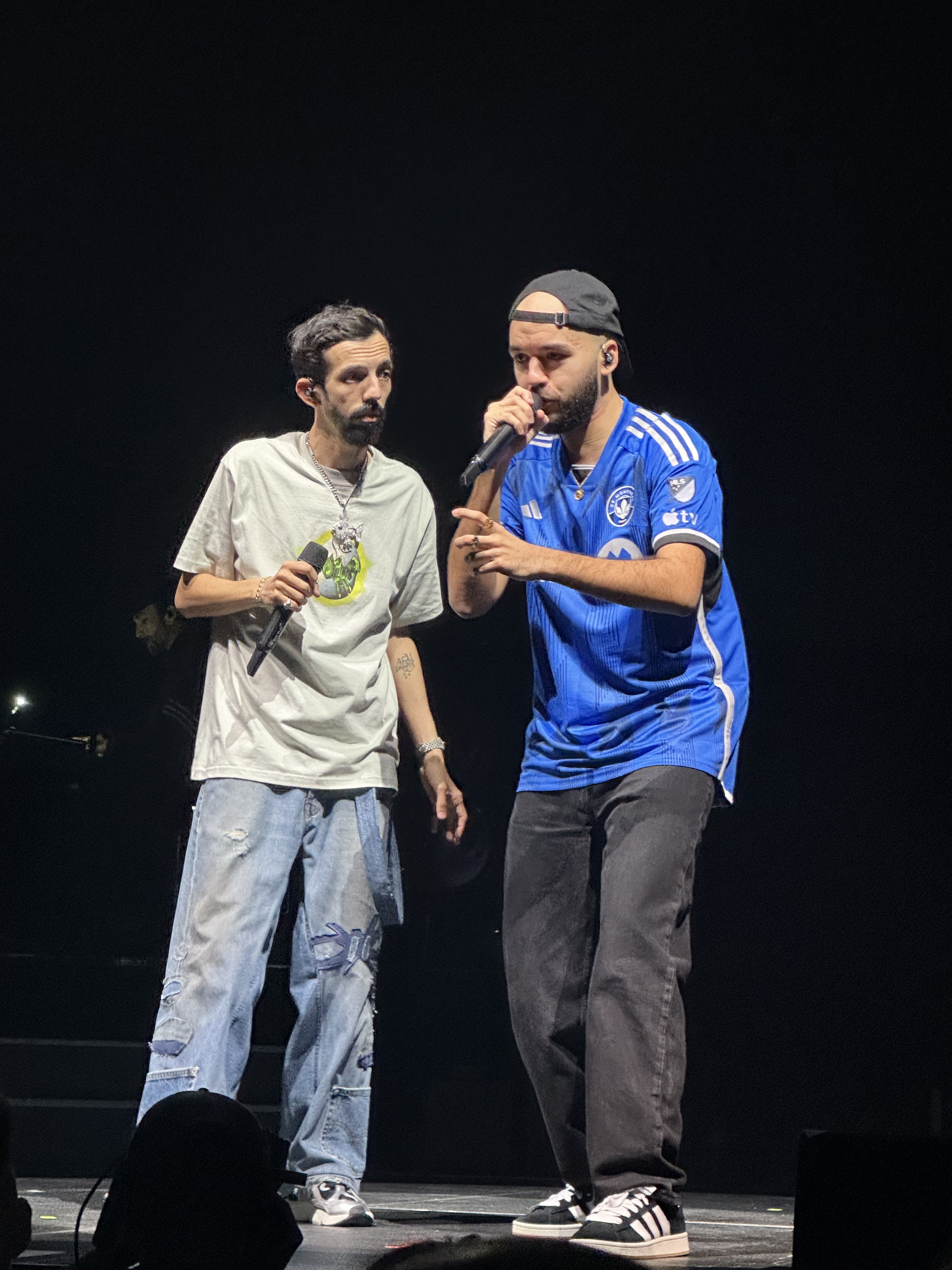
Bigflo & Oli (duo, 12–13)

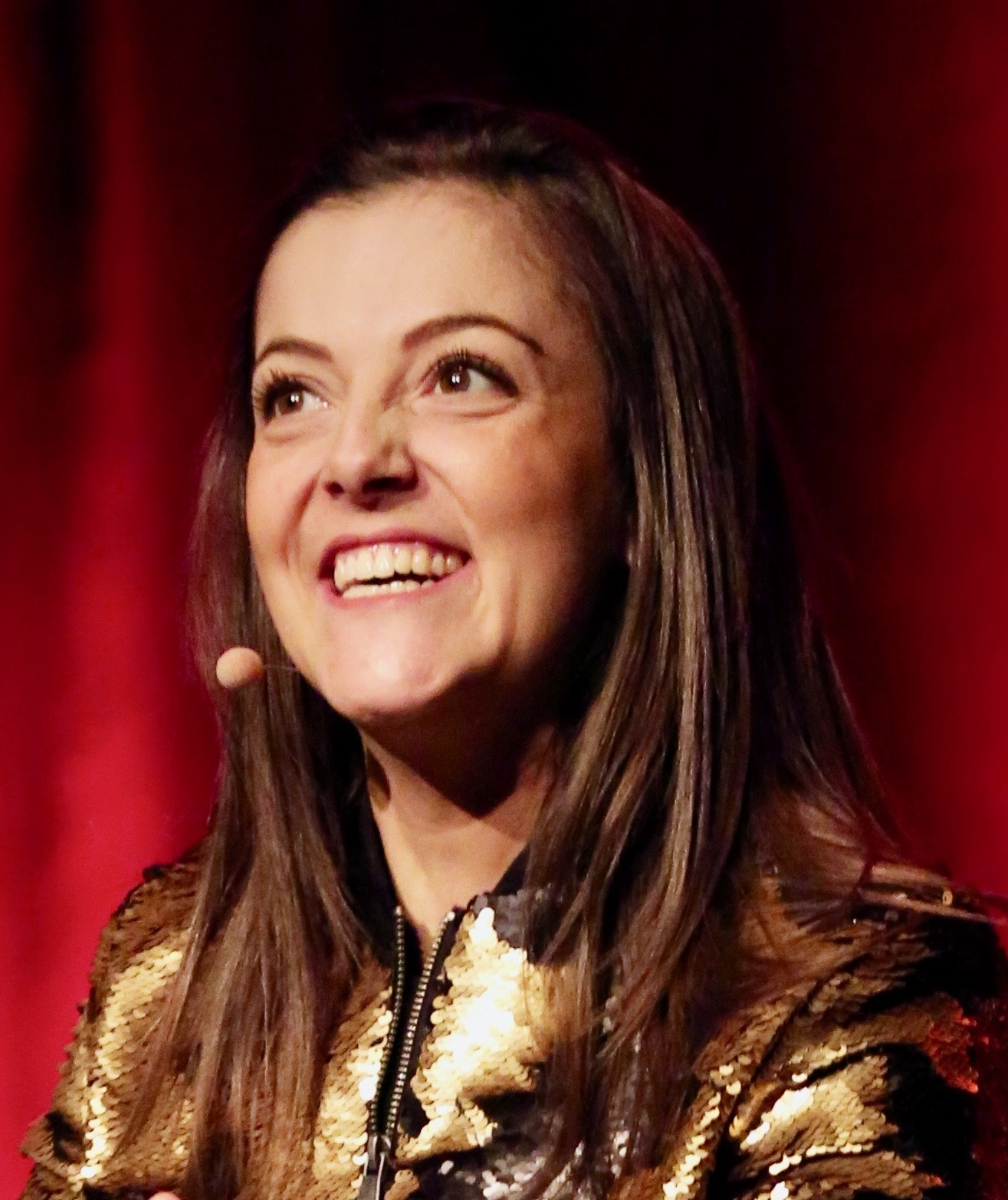
Camille Lellouche (Comeback Stage, 13)

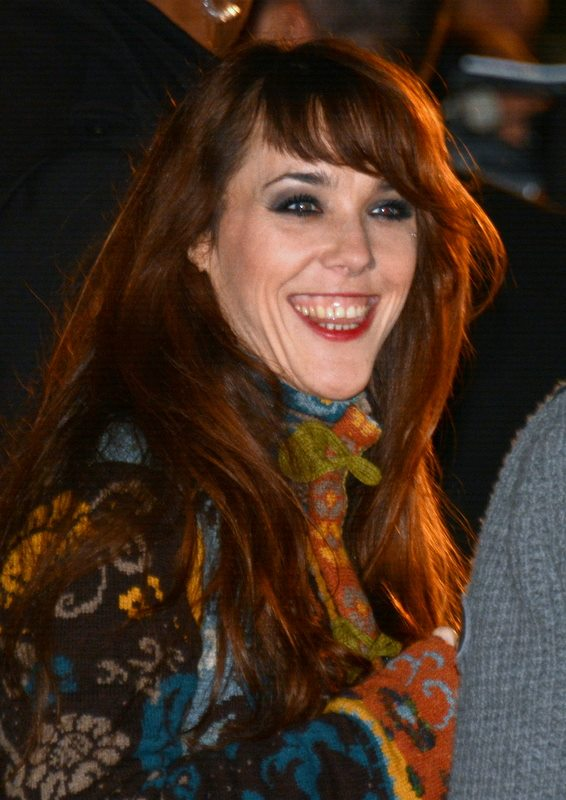
Zaz (14)

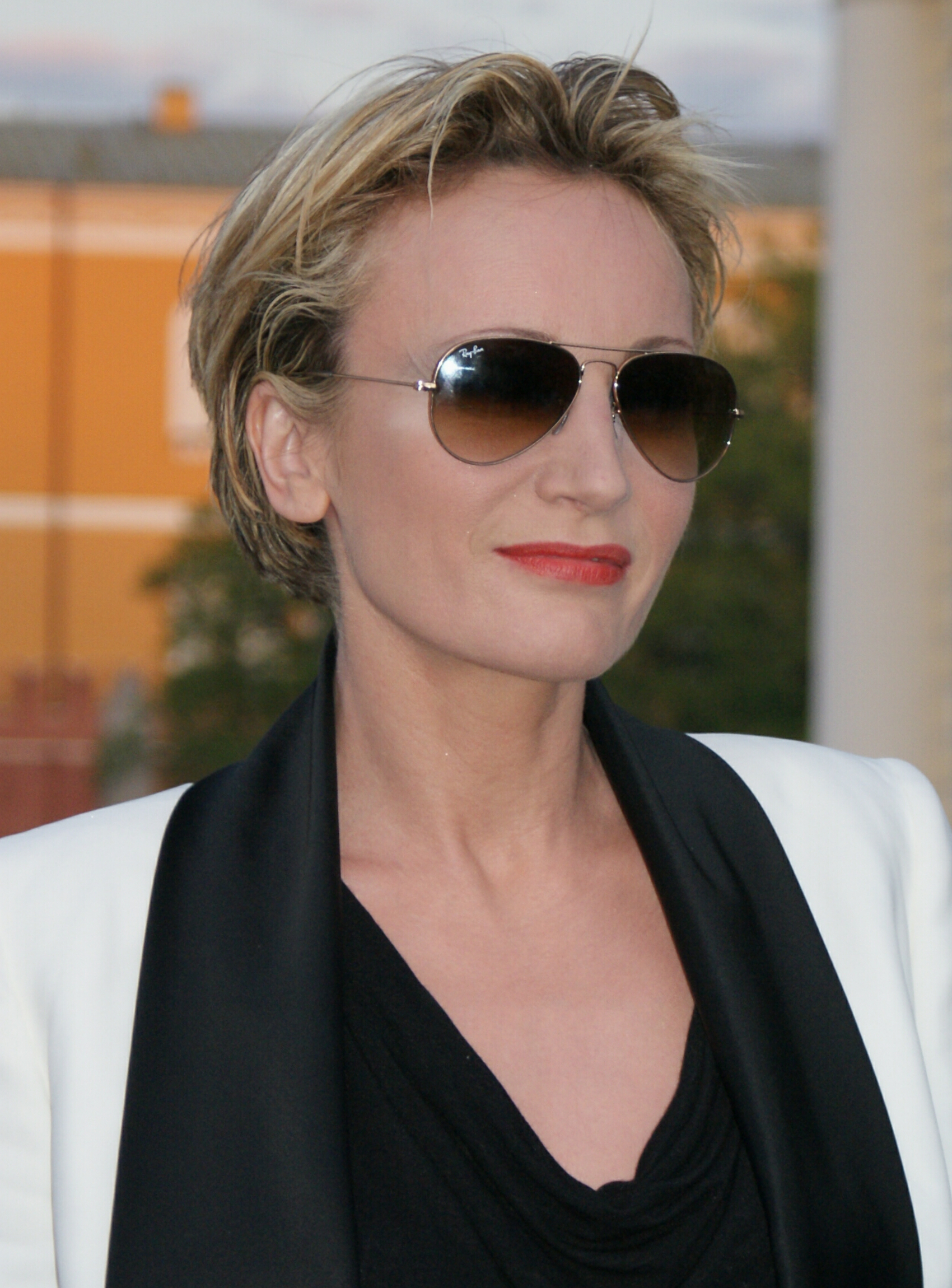
Patricia Kaas (14)

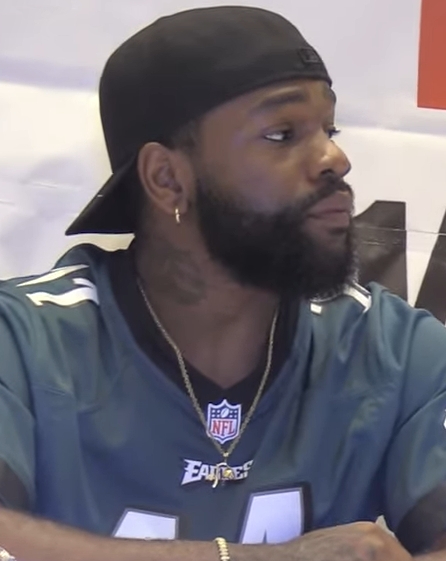
Tayc (15–)

Marine (upcoming in 16)

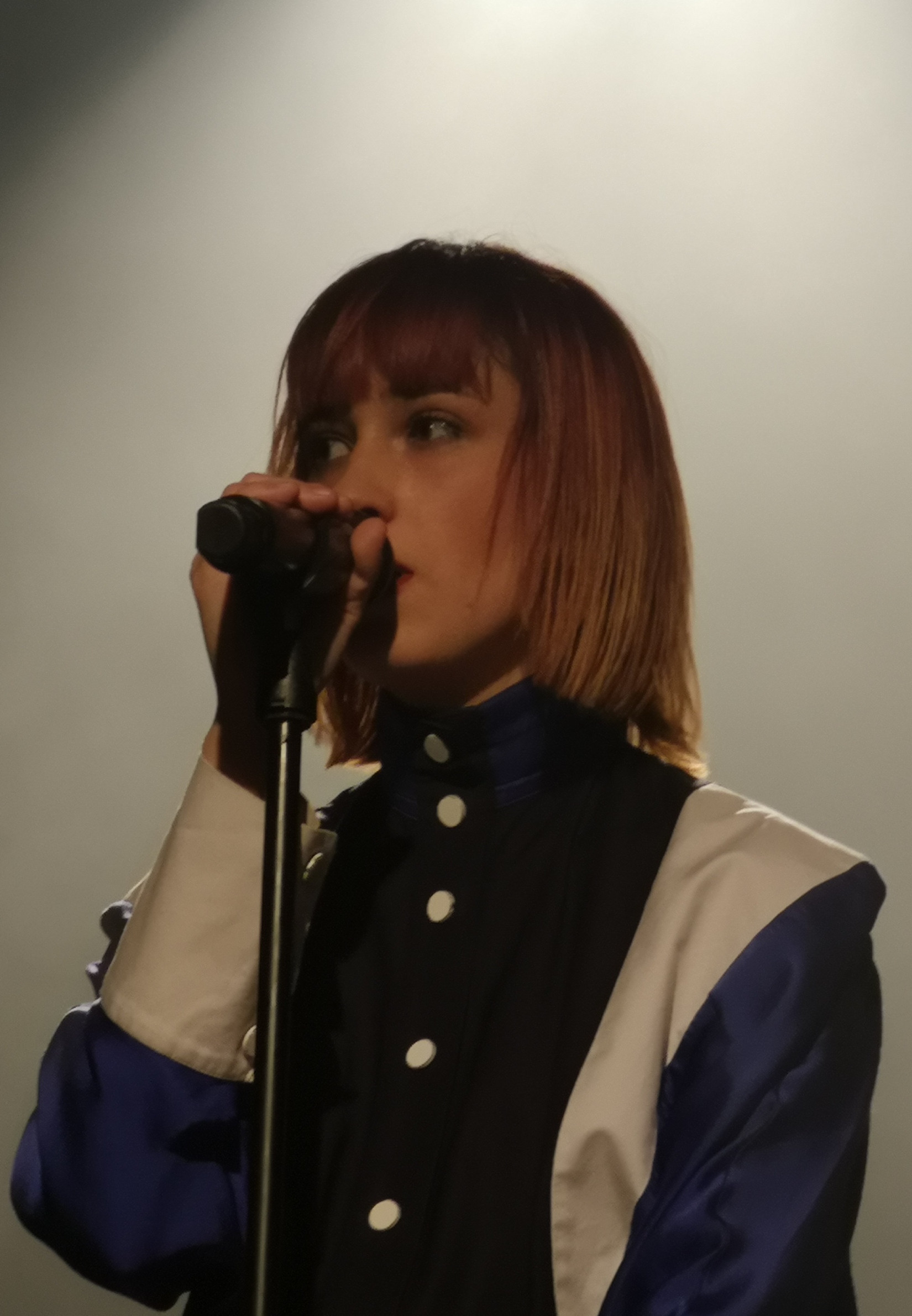
Suzane (upcoming in 16)

=== Line-up of Coaches ===
Coaches' line-up by chairs order
Season	Year	Coaches			
Season	Year	1	2	3	4
1	2012	Florent	Jenifer	Louis	Garou
2	2013	Florent	Jenifer	Louis	Garou
3	2014	Florent	Jenifer	Mika	Garou
4	2015	Florent	Jenifer	Mika	Zazie
5	2016	Florent	Mika	Zazie	Garou
6	2017	Florent	Mika	Zazie	Matt
7	2018	Florent	Zazie	Mika	Pascal
8	2019	Julien	Jenifer	Mika	Soprano
9	2020	Lara	Amel	Marc	Pascal
10	2021	Florent	Amel	Vianney	Marc
11	2022	Florent	Amel	Vianney	Marc
12	2023	Zazie	Amel	Vianney	Bigflo & Oli
13	2024	Vianney	Zazie	Mika	Bigflo & Oli
14	2025	Florent	Zaz	Vianney	Patricia
15	2026	Florent	Amel	Lara	Tayc
16	2027	Mika	Marine	Suzane	Tayc

=== Hosts ===
Seasons
Presenters	1	2	3	4	5	6	7	8	9	10	11	12	13	14	15
Nikos Aliagas															
Virginie de Clausade															
Karine Ferri															
Anaïs Grangerac															

Presenters gallery

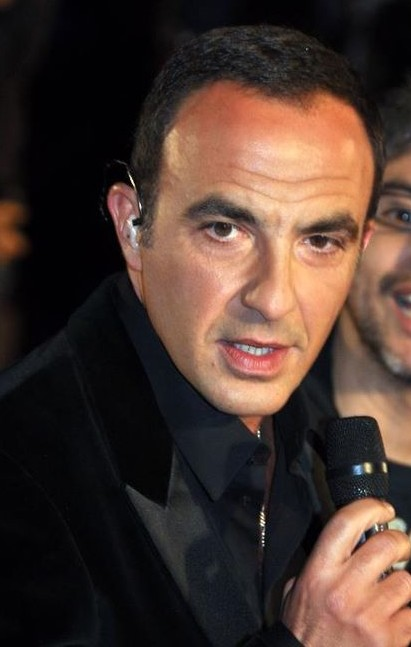
Nikos Aliagas (2012–)

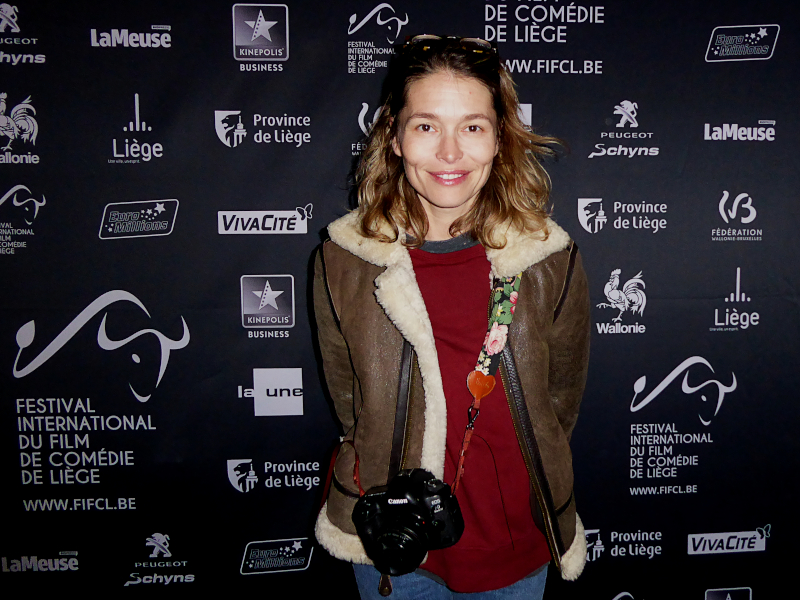
Virginie de Clausade (2012)

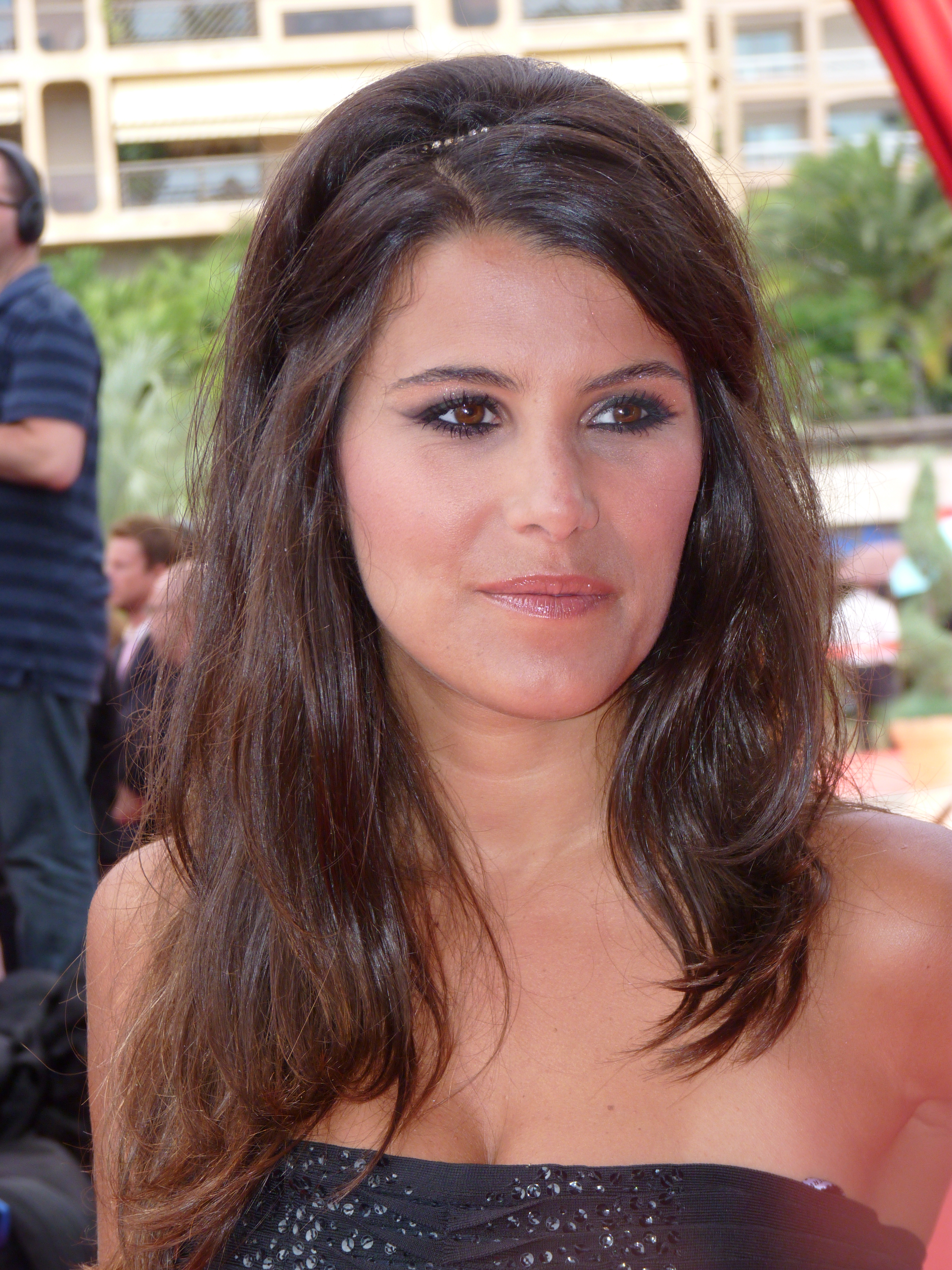
Karine Ferri (2013–2021)

== Series overview ==
Warning: the following table presents a significant amount of different colors.

Teams color key
Artist from Team Florent	Artist from Team Pascal	Artist from Team Nolwenn
Artist from Team Garou	Artist from Team Soprano	Artist from Team Bigflo & Oli
Artist from Team Jenifer	Artist from Team Julien	Artist from Team Camille
Artist from Team Louis	Artist from Team Lara	Artist from Team Zaz
Artist from Team Mika	Artist from Team Amel	Artist from Team Patricia
Artist from Team Zazie	Artist from Team Marc	Artist from Team Tayc
Artist from Team Matt	Artist from Team Vianney

The Voice: la plus belle voix series overview
Season	Aired	Winner	Runner-up	Third place	Fourth place	Fifth place	Winning coach	Presenters
1	2012	Stéphan Rizon	Louis Delort	Al.Hy	Aude Henneville	—N/a	Florent Pagny	Nikos Aliagas
2	2013	Yoann Fréget	Olympe	Nuno Resende	Loïs Silvin	—N/a	Garou	Nikos Aliagas
3	2014	Kendji Girac	Maximilien Philippe	Amir Haddad	Wesley Semé	—N/a	Mika	Nikos Aliagas
4	2015	Lilian Renaud	Anne Sila	David Thibault	Côme	—N/a	Zazie	Nikos Aliagas
5	2016	Slimane Nebchi	MB14	Antoine Galey	Clément Verzi	—N/a	Florent Pagny	Nikos Aliagas
6	2017	Lisandro Cuxi	Lucie Vagenheim	Vincent Vinel	Nicola Cavallaro	—N/a	Matt Pokora	Nikos Aliagas
7	2018	Maëlle Pistoia	Raffi Arto	Yoann Casanova	Xam Hurricane	—N/a	Zazie	Nikos Aliagas
8	2019	Whitney Marin	Clément Albertini	Sidoine Rémy	Pierre Danaé	—N/a	Mika	Nikos Aliagas
9	2020	Abi Bernadoth	Gustine	Tom Rochet	Antoine Delie	—N/a	Pascal Obispo	Nikos Aliagas
10	2021	Marghe Davico	Jim Bauer	Mentissa Aziza	Cyprien Zéni	—N/a	Florent Pagny	Nikos Aliagas
11	2022	Nour Brousse	Mister Mat	Vike	Caroline Costa	Loris Triolo	Florent Pagny	Nikos Aliagas
12	2023	Aurélien Vivos	Micha	Jérémy Levif	Arslane	—N/a	Zazie	Nikos Aliagas
13	2024	Alphonse	Baptiste Sartoria	Gabriel Lobao	Iris Fournier	Shanys	Zazie	Nikos Aliagas
14	2025	II Cello	Gianni Carello	Méga	Mickaël Gallo	—N/a	Florent Pagny	Nikos Aliagas
15	2026	Lady O	CJM's	Tessa B.	Hugo Derose	—N/a	Florent Pagny	Nikos Aliagas

== Coaches' results ==
Considering the final placement of the contestants who are members of their team (not the final placement of the coaches):

Coaches' results
Coach	Winner	Runner-up	Third place	Fourth place	Fifth place	Sixth place
Florent Pagny	7 times (1, 5, 10-11, all-stars, 14-15)	Thrice (4, 6-7)	Twice (2, all-stars)	Once (3)	—	Once (all-stars)
Zazie	4 times (4, 7, 12-13)	—	—	Twice (5-6)	—	—
Mika	Twice (3, 8)	Once (5)	4 times (4, 6-7, 13)	Once (all-stars)	—	—
Garou	Once (2)	Twice (1, 3)	Once (5)	—	—	—
Matt Pokora	Once (6)	—	—	—	—	—
Pascal Obispo	Once (9)	—	—	Once (7)	—	—
Vianney	—	Twice (11, 13)	Thrice (10, 12, 14)	—	—	—
Amel Bent	—	Twice (12, 15)	Twice (9, 11)	Twice (10, 12)	—	—
Jenifer	—	Once (2)	Thrice (1, 3, 8)	Once (4)	Once (all-stars)	—
Marc Lavoine	—	Once (10)	—	Twice (9, 11)	—	—
Lara Fabian	—	Once (9)	—	Once (15)	—	—
Soprano	—	Once (8)	—	—	—	—
Zaz	—	Once (14)	—	—	—	—
Patrick Fiori	—	Once (all-stars)	—	—	—	—
Tayc	—	—	Once (15)	—	—	—
Louis Bertignac	—	—	—	Twice (1-2)	—	—
Julien Clerc	—	—	—	Once (8)	—	—
Bigflo & Oli	—	—	—	Once (13)	—	—
Patricia Kaas	—	—	—	Once (14)	—	—
Nolwenn Leroy	—	—	—	—	Once (11)	—
Camille Lellouche	—	—	—	—	Once (13)	—
Marine	TBA					
Suzane	TBA					

== The Voice All-Stars ==
For the first-decade anniversary special of The Voice France, and for the first time in the history of The Voice, there would be 5 coaches for 5 individual seats under the first All-Stars version, where contestants from previous seasons would participate. Coaches for this special spinoff are Florent Pagny, Jenifer, Mika, Zazie, all of whom has served as coaches on the main show; and The Voice Kids coach Patrick Fiori.

The Voice All-Stars series overview
Season	Aired	Winner	Runner-up	Third place	Fourth place	Fifth place	Sixth place	Winning coach	Presenters	Coaches (chairs' order)				
Season	Aired	Winner	Runner-up	Third place	Fourth place	Fifth place	Sixth place	Winning coach	Presenters	1	2	3	4	5
1	2021	Anne Sila	Louis Delort	MB14	Terrence James	Amalya Delepierre	Manon Maley	Florent Pagny	Nikos Aliagas, Karine Ferri	Florent	Jenifer	Mika	Zazie	Patrick

== Coaches' teams and finalists ==
- Winner
- Runner-up
- Third place
- Fourth place/Eliminated
- Fifth place/Eliminated

Winners are in bold, finalists in the finale are listed first, stolen artists are in italicized font, and eliminated artists are in small font.

Season	Florent Pagny	Jenifer	Louis Bertignac	Garou	No fifth coach
1	**Stéphan Rizon**; Dominique Magloire; Stéphanie Lamia; Lise Darly	Al.Hy; Amalya; Thomas Mignot; Sonia Lacen	Aude Henneville; Rubby; Louise; Vigon	Louis Delort; Atef; Jhony Maalouf; Blandine Aggery	No fifth coach
2	Nuno Resende; Dièse; Benjamin Bocconi; Pierre G.	Olympe; Anthony Touma; Laura Chab; Sarah Bismuth	Loïs Silvin; Louane Emera; Cécilia Pascal; Shadoh	**Yoann Fréget**; Emmanuel Djob; Baptiste Defromont; Manurey	No fifth coach
3	Florent Pagny	Jenifer	Mika	Garou	No fifth coach
3	Wesley Semé; Stacey King; Charlie; Juliette Moraine	Amir Haddad; Manon Trinquier; La Petite Shade; Lioan	**Kendji Girac**; Élodie Martelet; Fréro Delavega; Caroline Savoie	Maximilien Philippe; Igit; Flo; Natacha Andreani	No fifth coach
4	Florent Pagny	Jenifer	Mika	Zazie	No fifth coach
4	Anne Sila; Camille Lellouche; Awa Sy; Elvya Gary	Côme; Battista Acquaviva; Alvy Zamé; Manon Palmer	David Thibault; Hiba Tawaji; Yassine Jebli; Sharon Laloum	**Lilian Renaud**; Guilhem Valayé; Yoann Launey; Mathilde Bonneterre	No fifth coach
5	Florent Pagny	Mika	Zazie	Garou	No fifth coach
5	**Slimane Nebchi**; Amandine Rapin; Lucyl Cruz; Ana Ka	MB14; Arcadian; Gabriella Laberge; Tamara Weber-Fillon	Clément Verzi; Sol; Léna Woods; Philippine	Antoine Galey; Anahy; Alexandre Carcelen; Mood	No fifth coach
6	Florent Pagny	Mika	Zazie	Matt Pokora	No fifth coach
6	Lucie Vagenheim; Shaby; Hélène Siau; Julia Paul	Vincent Vinel; Audrey Joumas; Imane Mchangama; The SugaZz	Nicola Cavallaro; Matthieu Baronne; Marvin Dupré; Emmy Liana	**Lisandro Cuxi**; Ann-Shirley Ngoussa; Marius; Dilomé	No fifth coach
7	Florent Pagny	Zazie	Mika	Pascal Obispo	No fifth coach
7	Raffi Arto; Yasmine Ammari; Hobbs; Gabriel	**Maëlle Pistoia**; B. Demi-Mondaine; Edouard Edouard; Liv Del Estal	Yoann Casanova; Frédéric Longbois; Guillaume; Sherley Parédès	Xam Hurricane; Ecco; Betty Patural; Kriill	No fifth coach
8	Julien Clerc	Jenifer	Mika	Soprano	No fifth coach
8	Pierre Danaé; Léonard; Laureen; Théophile Renier	Sidoine Rémy; Léona Winter; Poupie; Arezki & Geoffrey	**Whitney Marin**; Gjon's Tears; London Loko; Albi	Clément Albertini; Vay; Gage; Scam Talk & Mayeul	No fifth coach
9	Lara Fabian	Amel Bent	Marc Lavoine	Pascal Obispo	No fifth coach
9	Gustine; Cheyenne Janas; Maria Cuche	Tom Rochet; Térence James; Toni	Antoine Delie; Antony Trice; Ifè	**Abi Bernadoth**; Vérushka; Baby J	No fifth coach
10	Florent Pagny	Amel Bent	Vianney	Marc Lavoine	No fifth coach
10	**Marghe Davico**; Giada Capraro	Cyprien Zeni; Niki Black	Mentissa Aziza	Jim Bauer; Arthur Chaminade; Tarik	No fifth coach
All-Stars 1	Florent Pagny	Jenifer	Mika	Zazie	Patrick Fiori
All-Stars 1	**Anne Sila**; MB14; Manon Maley; Dominique Magloire	Amalya Delepierre	Terrence James; Anthony Touma; Victoria Adamo; Paul Ventimila	Will Barber; Demi Mondaine; Gjon's Tears	Louis Delort; Flo Malley; Antoine Galey
11	Nolwenn Leroy (Comeback stage)	Florent Pagny	Amel Bent	Vianney	Marc Lavoine
11	Loris Triolo	**Nour Brousse**; Lou Dassi	Vike; Mary Milton; Doryan Ben	Mister Mat; Pauline Nagy; Louise Charbonnel	Caroline Costa; ~~Loris Triolo~~
12	Zazie	Amel Bent	Vianney	Bigflo & Oli	No fifth coach
12	**Aurélien Vivos**	Micha; Arslane	Jérémy Levif; Kiona	Fanchon; Dame; Hanna	No fifth coach
13	Camille Lellouche (Comeback stage)	Vianney	Zazie	Mika	Bigflo & Oli
13	Shanys; Mewhy	Baptiste Sartoria; Odem	**Alphonse**; Lize	Gabriel Lobao; Clément Massy	Iris Fournier; Adnaé
14	Florent Pagny	Zaz	Vianney	Patricia Kaas	No fifth coach
14	**II Cello**; César Varadero; Emilio Amico	Gianni Carello; Maag; Neven Carron	Méga; Iman; Kilonga	Mickaël Gallo; Aidan Rohr; Laëlia Francius	No fifth coach
15	Florent Pagny	Amel Bent	Lara Fabian	Tayc	No fifth coach
15	**Lady O** Sam	CJM's; Gros Monsieur	Hugo Derose; Lohi	Tessa B. Mickaelle Leslie	No fifth coach
16	Mika	Marine	Suzane	Tayc	No fifth coach
16	Upcoming season				No fifth coach
