= Virginie de Clausade =

French-Belgian actress, radio and TV presenter

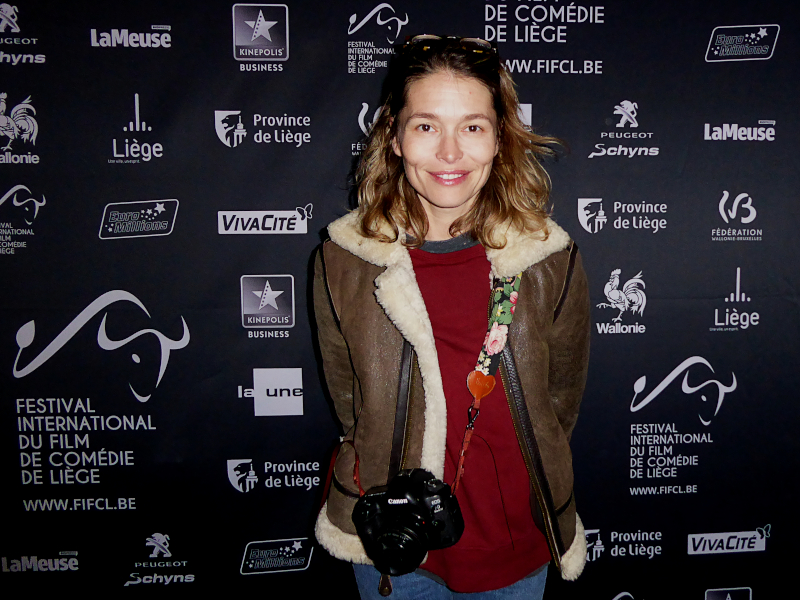
- Virginie de Clausade - FIFCL 2019.jpg
- Born: 22 April 1981 (age 44); Paris, France
- Occupation(s): Actress, radio presenter, television presenter
- Years active: 2000–present
- Television: Les Enfants de la télé (TF1); Tout pour plaire (TFX); Paris tout compris (France 3); The Voice (TF1)
- Height: 5 ft 4 in (1.63 m)

Virginie de Clausade (French pronunciation: [viʁʒini də klozad]; born 22 April 1981) is a French-Belgian actress, radio and television presenter.

== Television career ==
Virginie de Clausade began her career on television presenting with Laurent Nicourt and Hervé Nicourt the short program Que dire ? on channel Paris Première during a few months. From 2004 to 2006, she was a columnist in the program Ça balance à Paris hosted by Michel Field on the same channel, and then hosted by Laurent Ruquier and Pierre Lescure.

In September 2006 she became a columnist on France 2 in the program On a tout essayé hosted by Laurent Ruquier, and still on Ça balance à Paris hosted by Pierre Lescure since the same date.

Since May 2007 she co-hosts on TF1 the program Les Enfants de la télé with Arthur. She also presents Le club TF1 : voyage and Le club TF1 : j'invite on the same channel, short programs about practical information. She presents on NT1 the game show Tout pour plaire about dating.

From October 2010 to February 2011 she presented Paris tout compris on France 3 and again for a second season.

From February to May 2012 she co-hosted The Voice: la plus belle voix with Nikos Aliagas on TF1.

== Radio career ==
She is also present every Monday on Europe 1 with Laurent Ruquier in the radio program On va s'gêner. She co-hosts since 24 August 2009 the morning program Menu à la radio ! on Fun Radio from Monday to Friday.

== Personal life ==
Virginie de Clausade is the granddaughter of the director of the Palais des congrès de Paris. She is the daughter of Belgian comedians and her uncle is the producer of the French game show host Vincent Lagaf'.

She gave birth to a son named Mercuito in 2008 from her first relationship with Luc Charles. She had another son named Vadim (born on 13 March 2011) with French actor Dimitri Storoge. She also had a relationship with American actor Michael Pitt.
