= Pistoia (surname) =

Pistoia is an Italian surname. Notable people with the surname include:

- Cino da Pistoia (1270-1336), Italian poet
- Maëlle Pistoia (born 2001), French singer
- Nicola Pistoia (born 1954), Italian actor, director, and playwright

== See also ==
- Pistoia (disambiguation)
