= David Thibault =

French Canadian singer (born 1997)

David Thibault (born May 21, 1997) is a French Canadian singer. In 2015, Thibault competed in season 4 of the French talent show The Voice: la plus belle voix finishing third.

== Personal life ==
Thibault completed his last year of Quebec secondary school in 2013. A native French speaker, he is also fluent in English.

== Career ==
Thibault became interested in Elvis due to his grandfather. He attracted media attention as a 16-year-old in December 2013 when he performed a cover of Elvis Presley's "Blue Christmas". After the radio station CKOI-FM uploaded it onto YouTube on December 9, 2013, the cover went viral with almost five million video views within a week.

On December 23, 2013, Thibault appeared on The Ellen Degeneres Show.

=== The Voice: la plus belle voix ===
Thibault competed in season 4 of the talent show The Voice: la plus belle voix on French TV and reached the finals. 16 episodes were recorded in France from November 2014 to January 2015 and were aired each Saturday evening from January 10, 2015 to April 25, 2015. Thibault's blind audition, during which he sang Elvis Presley's "Blue Suede Shoes", was broadcast on January 24, 2015 and Florent Pagny was the only coach who turned around. Under Pagny's coaching, Thibualt won the battle against Olympe Assohoto and Ketlyn, with whom he sang Johnny Hallyday's "La Musique que j'aime", in the episode broadcast on March 7, 2015.

During the 11th episode, broadcast on March 21, 2015, and still under Pagny's coaching, he sang The Temptations' 1964 hit song "My Girl". He lost to Anne Sila, but coach Mika was allowed to add Thibault to his own team. Mika is the 2015 coach who has sold the largest number of records worldwide. During the 13th episode, broadcast on April 4, 2015, and under Mika's coaching, Thibault sang Avicii's 2013 hit song "Wake Me Up!". He was chosen by a majority of the viewing audience to stay in the competition, along with teammate Hiba Tawaji. Coach Mika saved a 3rd contestant, but the team's 4th contestant was eliminated from the competition.

During the 14th episode, i.e. the quarter-finals broadcast on April 11, 2015, all 12 contestants sang a song selected by the viewing audience. Thibault performed The Cure's 1985 song "Close to Me". Tawaji is saved by the viewing audience and he is saved by Mika. During the 15th episode, i.e. the semi-finals broadcast on April 18, 2015, Thibault sang Beyoncé's 2003 song "Crazy in Love". With Tawaji, he sang Carson Parks's song "Somethin' Stupid". and was chosen by both the viewing audience and coach Mika, while Tawaji was eliminated.

During the 16th and last episode, i.e. the finals broadcast on April 25, 2015, Thibault sang Michael Jackson's song "Black or White", imitating the latter's famous moonwalk, before performing a duet with French pop singer Véronique Sanson, interpreting her song "On m'attend là-bas". He concluded with a duet with his coach Mika, interpreting "Your Song", Elton John's first hit single in 1970. Only the (French) viewing audience voted this time. French competitor Lilian Renaud won the competition with 52% of the votes, female French singer Anne Sila finished second with 34% of the votes, Thibault finished third with 9% of the votes, and French singer Côme received 5% of the votes. According to a press release, around the day of the broadcast of the finals negotiations occurred with record companies to record Thibault's first album.

Thibault participated in the French tour with the other 3 finalists and the 4 semi-finalists of The Voice: la plus belle voix. The tour took place in 18 French towns from May 29 to July 4, 2015. He sang at the Zénith de Paris on June 27. Thibault was also scheduled to tour Quebec in May and July 2015 and appear at the salle Albert-Rousseau in Quebec on November 29, 2015.

== Awards ==
Year	Nominee / work	Award	Result
2013	Himself	People's Choice Award: "In the Shoes of Elvis".	Won
