= Pistoia (disambiguation) =

Pistoia may refer to:

- Pistoia, city and comune in the Italian region of Tuscany
- 16 Motorised Division Pistoia, an infantry division of the Royal Italian Army during World War II
- Pistoia (surname), an Italian surname
- Synod of Pistoia, 18th century church council
