= Toutes les machines ont un cœur =

Single by Maëlle

from the album Maëlle
- Released: April 5, 2019
- Genre: Pop, chanson
- Length: 4:19
- Label: Mercury Music Group
- Composer: Calogero
- Lyricist: Zazie
- Producer: Calogero

Music video
- "Toutes les machines ont un cœur" on YouTube

"Toutes les machines ont un cœur" (English translation: "All machines have a heart") is a song by French singer Maëlle. She released it as her debut single on 5 April 2019. The song was included on her debut album, Maëlle.

== Composition ==
The song was written by Zazie and composed and produced by Calogero.

== Music video ==
The music video, directed by Nur Casadevall., premiered on YouTube on 29 July 2019. It was shot in Barcelona in June. Maëlle was shooting it three days before her BAC in Social & Economics Sciences (SES).

== Track listing ==
- Digital download
1. "Toutes les machines ont un cœur" – 4:19

== Charts ==
| Chart (2019) | Peak position |
|---|---|
| Belgium (Ultratip Bubbling Under Wallonia) | 17 |
| France (SNEP) | 148 |
| France (SNEP) Download Chart | 20 |
| Switzerland (Media Control Romandy) | 12 |

== Certifications and sales ==
| Region | Certification | Certified units/sales |
|---|---|---|
| France (SNEP) | Platinum | 200,000^{‡} |
^{‡} Sales+streaming figures based on certification alone.
