= The Voice: la plus belle voix season 5 =

The Voice: la plus belle voix
- Season 5
- Hosted by: Nikos Aliagas; Karine Ferri
- Judges: Florent Pagny, Mika, Zazie, Garou
- Winner: Slimane Nebchi

Release
- Original network: TF1
- Original release: January 30 – May 14, 2016

Season chronology
- ← Previous; Season 4 Next → Season 6

The Voice: la plus belle voix (season 5) is the fifth season of the French reality singing competition, created by media tycoon John de Mol. It was aired from 30 January 2016 to 14 May 2016 on TF1.

One of the important premises of the show is the quality of the singing talent. Four coaches, themselves popular performing artists, train the talents in their group and occasionally perform with them. Talents are selected in blind auditions, where the coaches cannot see, but only hear the auditioner.

Three of the coaches continued from season 4, namely were Florent Pagny, Zazie and Mika. But Garou from seasons 1, 2 and 3 and in hiatus for season 4 returned to replace Jenifer. Slimane Nebchi of Team Florent Pagny was the fifth season winner with finale held on May 14, 2016. MB14 from Team Mika was the runner-up.

== Overview ==
Color key

Winner
Second place
Third place
Fourth place
Eliminated in Semi-finals
Eliminated in Quarter finals
Eliminated in Live Show 1
Stolen in Épreuves Ultimes (Knockout rounds)
Eliminated in Épreuves Ultimes (Knockout rounds)
Stolen in the Battle rounds
Eliminated in the Battle rounds

Coaches	Artists				
Florent Pagny					
Florent Pagny	Slimane Nebchi	Amandine Rapin	Lucyl Cruz	Ana Ka	~~Philippine~~
Florent Pagny	Isa Koper	Lica de Guzman	Laurent-Pierre	Angy	Haylen
Florent Pagny	~~Mirella Toussaint~~	Lyn	Francesca Rodriguez	Mary Ann	Claudio Capéo
Florent Pagny	François Micheletto	Alcidia Accao Farias	Khady Ba		
Mika					
Mika	MB14	Arcadian	Gabriella Laberge	Tamara Weber-Fillon	Sweem
Mika	Louis Jelmini	Mélodie Pastor	Louisa Rose	Grannhild	Mirella Toussaint
Mika	Thibaud Maillefer	Virginie Schaeffer	Kora Jamson	Émilie Burget	Nick Mallen
Mika	Dana	Sacha Perez	Mauranne	Ilowna Basselier	
Zazie					
Zazie	Clément Verzi	Sol	Léna Woods	Philippine	~~MB14~~
Zazie	~~Mood~~	Antoine Conde	Lukas K. Abdul	Julie Moralles	Jessanna Nemitz
Zazie	~~Derya Yildrim~~	~~Haylen~~	Sofiane	Jérémie Clamme	Araz Taman
Zazie	Axel Adou	Sam	Twins Phoenix		
Garou					
Garou	Antoine Galey	Anahy	Alexandre Carcelen	Mood	~~Ana Ka~~
Garou	Marc Hatem	Lola Baï	Luna Ginestet	Jessie-Lee Houiller	Derya Yildrim
Garou	~~Jessanna Nemitz~~	Clyde Rabatel-Zapatta	Akasha	Oma Jali	Beehann
Garou	Louyena	Raphaël Logan	Hadrien Collin		

== Results ==
=== « Auditions à l'aveugle » (Blind Auditions) ===
Blind auditions color key
✔	Coach pressed "JE VOUS VEUX" button
	Artist elected a coach's team
	Artist defaulted to a coach's team
	Artist was eliminated with no coach pressing their button

=== Episode 1 (January 30, 2016) ===
Order	Artist	Age	Hometown	Song	Coach's and artist's choices			
Order	Artist	Age	Hometown	Song	Florent	Mika	Zazie	Garou
1	Lucyl Cruz	24	Argenteuil	"Hello" (Adele)	✔	✔	✔	✔
2	Ilona	18	Saintes	"Comme toi" (Jean-Jacques Goldman)	–	–	–	–
3	Antoine	16	Châteauneuf-Grasse	"Boys Don't Cry" (The Cure)	✔	✔	✔	✔
4	Luna	17	Agen	"Battez-vous" (Bridgette)	✔	–	–	✔
5	Gabriella Laberge	22	Montréal, Canada	"The Scientist" (Coldplay)	✔	✔	✔	✔
6	Mickaëlle	22	Paris	"Uptown Funk" (Bruno Mars)	–	–	–	–
7	Réphaël Logan	24	Nancy	"Ain't No Sunshine" (Bill Withers)	✔	✔	✔	✔
8	Mood	30	Nantes	"Je suis un homme" (Zazie)	✔	–	✔	✔
9	Angy	26	Toulon	"At Last" (Etta James)	✔	–	–	–
10	Sol	29	Dijon	"Crazy" (Gnarls Barkley)	✔	✔	✔	✔
11	Rhéa	18	Lebanon	"Caravane" (Raphaël)	–	–	–	–
12	Lyn	29	Rouen	"FourFiveSeconds" (Rihanna)	✔	–	–	✔
13	Arcadian (Flo, Yoann, Jérôme)	21-22	Rouennes & Tavannes	"Carmen" (Stromae)	✔	✔	–	–

=== Episode 2 (February 6, 2016) ===
Order	Artist	Age	Hometown	Song	Coach's and artist's choices			
Order	Artist	Age	Hometown	Song	Florent	Mika	Zazie	Garou
1	Ilowna Basselier	18	Fontenay-sous-Bois	"Lay Me Down" (Sam Smith)	✔	✔	–	✔
2	Beehann	31	Noisy-le-Grand	"Think" (Aretha Franklin)	✔	✔	–	✔
3	Slimane Nebchi	26	Les Lilas	"A fleur de toi" (Vitaa)	✔	✔	✔	✔
4	Laureen	25	Les Milles	"All About That Bass" (Meghan Trainor)	–	–	–	–
5	Léna Woods	27	Bois-Guillaume	"Halo" (Beyonce)	✔	✔	✔	✔
6	Louis Jelmini	19	Cernay-la-Ville	"Avant toi" (Calogero)	✔	✔	–	–
7	Adelice Bijotat	18	Alata	"Hold Back The River" (James Bay)	–	–	–	–
8	Ana Ka	27	Pontault Combault	"Heavy Cross" (Gossip)	✔	✔	✔	✔
9	Yoann Casanova	22	Biguglia	"Amsterdam" (Jacques Brel)	–	–	–	–
10	Araz Taman	25	Toulouse	"Wicked Game" (Chris Isaac)	✔	✔	✔	✔
11	Alcidia Accao Farias	33	Reims	"Prière païennes" (Céline Dion)	✔	–	–	–
12	Sweem	29	Paris	"Big Jet Plane" (Angus et Julia Stone)	–	✔	✔	–

=== Episode 3 (February 13, 2016) ===
Order	Artist	Age	Hometown	Song	Coach's and artist's choices			
Order	Artist	Age	Hometown	Song	Florent	Mika	Zazie	Garou
1	Isa Koper	31	Vincennes	"Georgia On My Mind" (Ray Charles)	✔	✔	–	✔
2	Mel Sugar	21	Gonesse	"No One" (Alicia Keys)	–	–	–	–
3	Clément Verzi	35	Paris	"Je to promets" (Johnny Hallyday)	✔	✔	✔	✔
4	Louyena (Roxanne Le Texier, Sébastien Agius)	24-32	Paris	"Waiting For Love" (Avicii)	–	✔	–	✔
5	Kora Jamson	23	Bezons	"Roxanne" (The Police)	✔	✔	✔	✔
6	Ben	26	Tunis, Tunisia	"Thinking Out Loud" (Ed Sheeran)	–	–	–	–
7	Sam	37	Périgueux	"Utile" (Julien Clerc)	✔	–	✔	–
8	Amandine Rapin	24	Chavornay, Switzerland	"Habits (Stay High)" (Tove Lo)	✔	✔	✔	✔
9	Claudio Capéo	39	Steinbach	"Chez Laurette" (Michel Delpech)	✔	–	–	–
10	Agathe	19	Paris	"Je vais t’aimer" (Michel Sardou)	–	–	–	–
11	Corentin Callonec	29	Toulouse	"Creep" (Radiohead)	–	–	–	–
12	Anahy	25	Geneva, Switzerland	"Parle-moi" (Isabelle Boulay)	✔	✔	–	✔
13	Émilie Burget	24	Leytron, Switzerland	"Chandelier" (Sia)	✔	✔	–	✔

=== Episode 4 (February 20, 2016) ===
Order	Artist	Age	Hometown	Song	Coach's and artist's choices			
Order	Artist	Age	Hometown	Song	Florent	Mika	Zazie	Garou
1	Akasha	22	Calenzana	"Bang Bang" (Cher)	✔	–	–	✔
2	Alexandre Carcelen	20	Paris	"Hallelujah" (Leonard Cohen)	✔	✔	✔	✔
3	François Micheletto	36	Cyprus	"With or Without You" (U2)	✔	–	–	–
4	Lisa Mary	16	Calvisson	"Paris-Seychelles" (Julien Doré)	–	–	–	–
5	Mauranne	25	Nîmes	"Lean On" (Major Lazer & DJ Snake (feat. MØ))	✔	✔	✔	✔
6	Naomie	28	Saint Ouen	"Hava Nagila"	–	–	–	–
7	Antoine Conde	18	Champcueil	"Another Love" (Tom Odell)	✔	✔	✔	–
8	Khady Ba	21	Mantes-la-Jolie	"It's a Man's Man's Man's World" (James Brown)	✔	–	–	✔
9	MB14	21	Amiens	"Gangsta's Paradise" (Coolio)	–	✔	✔	✔
10	Delphine Mailland	57	Allauch	"Nantes" (Barbara)	–	–	–	–
11	Tamara-Lyne Weber-Fillion	24	Montréal, Canada	"Knockin' on Heaven's Door" (Bob Dylan)	✔	✔	✔	✔
12	Clyde Rabatel Zapata	24	Wissous	"Let's Get It On" (Marvin Gaye)	–	–	–	✔

=== Episode 5 (February 27, 2016) ===
Order	Artist	Age	Hometown	Song	Coach's and artist's choices			
Order	Artist	Age	Hometown	Song	Florent	Mika	Zazie	Garou
1	Maag	30	Paris	"Stop!" (Sam Brown)	–	–	–	–
2	Hadrien Collin	21	Flémalle, Belgium	"Pas là" (Vianney)	–	✔	✔	✔
3	Mélodie Pastor	27	Montpellier	"Piece of My Heart" (Janis Joplin)	✔	✔	–	✔
4	Philippine	20	Le Havre	"The Sound of Silence" (Simon and Garfunkel)	✔	✔	✔	✔
5	Lukas Abdul	22	Sannois	"Les Mots Bleus" (Christophe)	✔	–	✔	–
6	Romain Mackenzie	27	Toulouse	"Stole the Show" (Kygo)	–	–	–	–
7	Julie Moralles	27	Tours	"Enjoy the Silence" (Depeche Mode)	✔	✔	✔	✔
8	Lola Baï	34	Sillé-le-Philippe	"To France" (Mike Oldfield)	✔	–	✔	✔
9	Aurel	23		"Je m'apelle Bagdad" (Tina Arena)	–	–	–	–
10	Mirella Toussaint	28	Paris	"Homeless" (Marina Kaye)	✔	–	–	–
11	Louisa Rose	16	Opio	"Wicked Game" (Chris Issak)	✔	✔	✔	✔
12	Nicolay Sanson	18	Montainville	"La Bombe Humaine" (Téléphone)	–	–	–	–
13	Dana	31	Peillac	"Divent au Dour"	–	✔	–	–

=== Episode 6 (March 5, 2016) ===
Order	Artist	Age	Hometown	Song	Coach's and artist's choices			
Order	Artist	Age	Hometown	Song	Florent	Mika	Zazie	Garou
1	Twins Phoenix (Hilal & Ismaël)	27	Saint Ouen	"Hey Mama" (David Guetta and Nicki Minaj)	✔	–	✔	–
2	Derya Yildirim	19	Strasbourg	"Les Paradis Perdus" (Christine and the Queens)	✔	✔	✔	✔
3	Stella	31	Paris	"California Dreamin’" (The Mamas and the Papas)	–	–	–	–
4	Laurent Pierre Lecordier	20	Villepinte	"Toi et moi" (Guillame Grand)	✔	–	–	–
5	Haylen Namvarazad	27	Montreuil	"Something's Got a Hold on Me" (Etta James)	✔	✔	✔	✔
6	Fabien	30	Aix-en-Provence	"Colder Weather" (Zac Brown Band)	–	–	–	–
7	Virginie Schaeffer	41	Strasbourg	"Black Horse and the Cherry Tree" (KT Tunstall)	✔	✔	–	✔
8	Sofiane	26	Émerainville	"Comme un fils" (Corneille)	–	–	✔	–
9	Marc Hatem	25	Beirut, Lebanon	"Take Me to Church" (Hozier)	✔	✔	✔	✔
10	Jessanna Nemitz	25	Évilard	"Je ne sais pas" (Zazie)	✔	✔	–	✔
11	Kevin Davy White	20	London, United Kingdom	"Use Somebody" (Kings of Leon)	–	–	–	–
12	Mary Ann	24	Paris	"Every Breath You Take" (The Police)	✔	✔	–	–
13	Nick Mallen	21	Paris	"Hello" (Adele)	–	✔	–	–

=== Episode 7 (March 12, 2016) ===
Order	Artist	Age	Hometown	Song	Coach's and artist's choices			
Order	Artist	Age	Hometown	Song	Florent	Mika	Zazie	Garou
1	Lica De Guzman	18	Geneva, Switzerland	"My All" (Mariah Carey)	✔	✔	✔	✔
2	Weelye	34	Clichy	"La Femme Chocolat" (Olivia Ruiz)	–	–	–	–
3	Grannhild	30	Marseille	"No Surprises" (Radiohead)	✔	✔	✔	✔
4	Sacha Perez	20	Charenton-le-Pont	"Little Things" (One Direction)	–	✔	–	–
5	Raphaël Perez	20	Montreuil	"This Love" (Maroon 5)	–	–	–	–
6	Francesca Rodriguez	21	Marseille	"Si tu m'aimes" (Lara Fabian)	✔	–	–	–
7	Oma Jali	28	Franconville	"Money for Nothing" (Dire Straits)	–	✔	✔	✔
8	Maëva Di Marino	16	Pers-Jussy	"Adieu" (Coeur de pirate)	–	–	–	–
9	Jessie Lee Houllier	22	Massy-Palaisseau	"Move Over" (Janis Joplin)	✔	✔	✔	✔
10	Emilie Duval	30	Oberkorn, Luxembourg	"L'amour existe encore" (Céline Dion)	–	–	–	–
11	Jérémie Clamme Jonaldes	31	Urschenheim	"Say You'll Be There" (Spice Girls)	–	✔	✔	✔
12	Mary Ann	24	Paris	"Every Breath You Take" (The Police)	–	–	✔	–
13	Thibaud Maillefer	20	Epautheyres, Switzerland	"All I Want" (Kodaline)	–	✔	–	✔

== Battles ==
Battles color key
Artist won the battle and advanced to the knockouts
Artist lost the battle, but was stolen by another coach, and, advanced to the knockouts
Artist lost the battle and was eliminated

Battles results
Episode	Coach	Order	Winner	Song	Loser	'Steal' result			
Episode	Coach	Order	Winner	Song	Loser	Florent	Mika	Zazie	Garou
Episode 8 (March 19, 2016)	Florent	1	Amandine Rapin	"Only Girl (in the World)" (Rihanna)	Khady Ba	–	–	–	–
Episode 8 (March 19, 2016)	Garou	2	Antoine	"Éteins la lumière" (Axel Bauer)	Hadrien Collin	–	–	–	–
Episode 8 (March 19, 2016)	Mika	3	Gabriella Laberge	"Castle in the Snow" (The Avener & Kadebostany)	Ilowna Basselier	–	–	–	–
Episode 8 (March 19, 2016)	Florent	4	Isa Koper	"L'Envie" (Johnny Hallyday)	Alcidia Accao Farias	–	–	–	–
Episode 8 (March 19, 2016)	Zazie	5	Sol	"Purple Rain" (Prince and The Revolution)	Haylen	✔	–	–	–
Episode 8 (March 19, 2016)	Mika	6	Arcadian	"Open Season" (Josef Salvat)	Mauranne	Team full	–	–	–
Episode 8 (March 19, 2016)	Garou	7	Luna Ginestet	"Le Paradis blanc" (Michel Berger)	Jessanna Nemitz	Team full	–	✔	–
Episode 8 (March 19, 2016)	Zazie	8	Mood	"Saint Claude" (Christine and the Queens)	Twins Phoenix	Team full	–	Team full	–
Episode 8 (March 19, 2016)	Garou	9	Marc Hatem	"Sex on Fire" (Kings of Leon)	Réphael Logan	Team full	–	Team full	–
Episode 8 (March 19, 2016)	Mika	10	Louis Jelmini	"Je te donne" (Jean-Jacques Goldman and Michael Jones)	Sacha Perez	Team full	–	Team full	–
Episode 9 (March 26, 2016)	Florent	1	Slimane Nebchi	"The Show Must Go On" (Queen)	François Micheletto	Team full	–	Team full	–
Episode 9 (March 26, 2016)	Garou	2	Lola Baï	Encore et encore (Francis Cabrel)	Louyena	Team full	–	Team full	–
Episode 9 (March 26, 2016)	Mika	3	Grannhild	Wonderful Life (Black)	Dana	Team full	–	Team full	–
Episode 9 (March 26, 2016)	Garou	4	Ana Ka	"Set Fire to the Rain" (Adele)	Beehann	Team full	–	Team full	–
Episode 9 (March 26, 2016)	Zazie	5	MB14	"Cry Me A River" (Justin Timberlake)	Derya Yildirim	Team full	–	Team full	✔
Episode 9 (March 26, 2016)	Florent	6	Laurent-Pierre Lecordier	Mathilde (Jacques Brel)	Claudio Capéo	Team full	—	Team full	Team full
Episode 9 (March 26, 2016)	Mika	7	Tamara Weber-Fillion	"Thinking Out Loud" (Ed Sheeran)	Nick Mallen	Team full	—	Team full	Team full
Episode 9 (March 26, 2016)	Zazie	8	Lukas K. Abdul	"Dernière Danse" (Indila)	Sam	Team full	—	Team full	Team full
Episode 9 (March 26, 2016)	Garou	9	Jessie-Lee Houiller	"Walk This Way" (Aerosmith and Run–DMC)	Oma Jali	Team full	—	Team full	Team full
Episode 9 (March 26, 2016)	Florent	10	Philippine	"Les Paradis perdus" (Christine and the Queens)	Mary Ann	Team full	—	Team full	Team full
Episode 9 (March 26, 2016)	Zazie	11	Antoine Conde	"Jeune et con" (Damien Saez)	Axel Adou	Team full	—	Team full	Team full
Episode 10 (April 2, 2016)
