= Suzane =

French singer

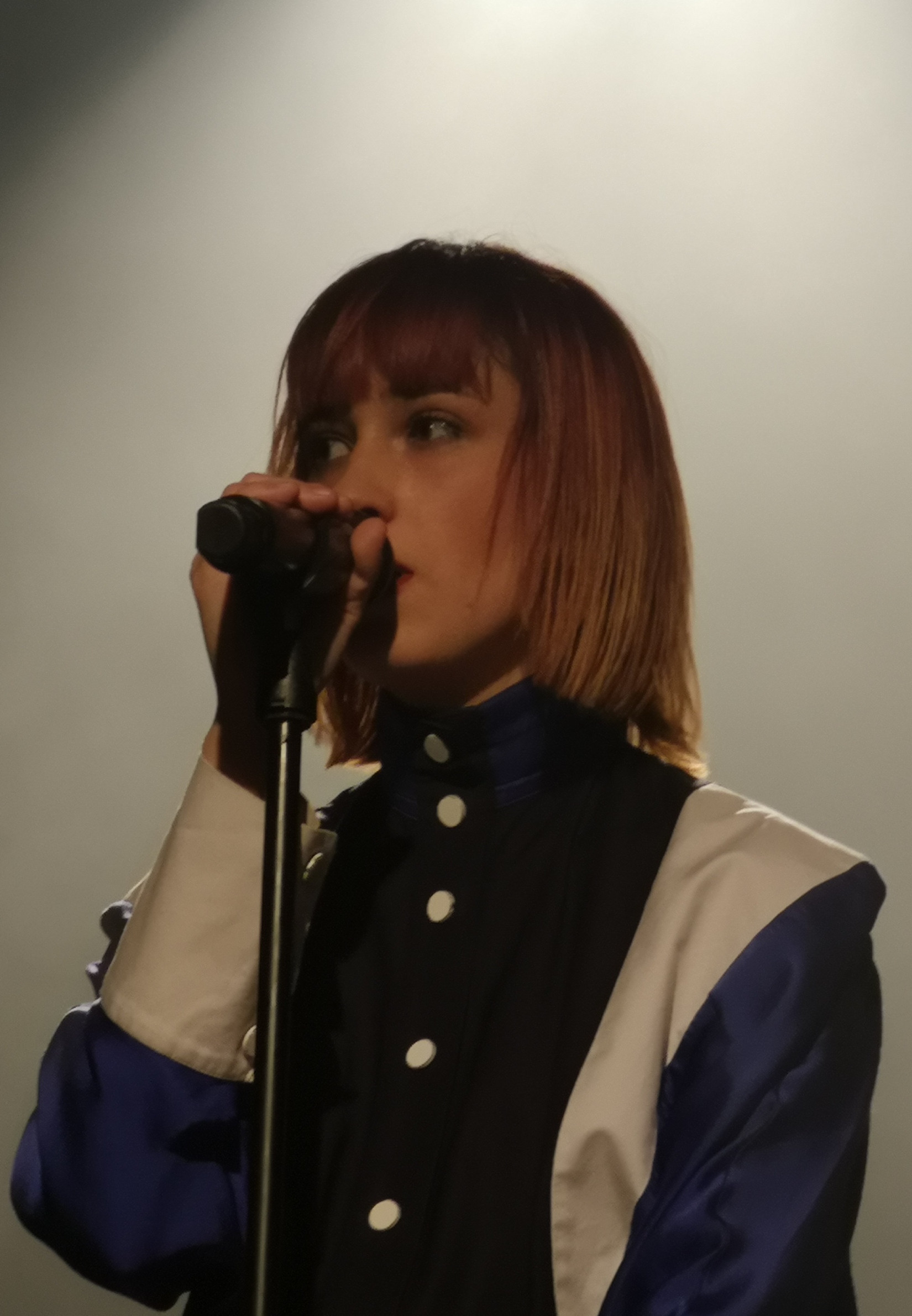
- Suzane in 2019

Background information
- Born: Océane Colom; 29 December 1990 (age 35); Avignon, France
- Genres: Pop; chanson; electropop; dance
- Occupations: Singer; Songwriter
- Years active: 2017–present
- Label: 3ème Bureau

Océane Colom (born 29 December 1990), better known by her stage name Suzane, is a French singer.

In the 35th edition of the Victoires de la Musique in 2020, she was awarded "Best new artist".

== Early years ==
Born in 1990 in Avignon, Suzane grew up in Les Angles in a marriage made up of a nurse and a civil servant. Both instilled in her from an early age her interest in music, with the help of artists such as Fréhel, Édith Piaf, Barbara, and Jacques Brel. When she was five years old, she started classical dance and from the age of eight she studied singing and music theory. During her adolescence, she combined her arts course at the institute with the Grand Avignon Conservatory of Music. After the death of a friend of hers during class, she fell into depression and abandoned her studies.

During the following years she worked different jobs, such as a supermarket cashier or waitress in a diner in Montpellier. In 2014 she decided to move to Paris, to the 20th arrondissement, where she spent four years working in restaurants and bars. At the same time, she resumed her artistic career, took singing lessons and began writing her first songs.

== Musical career ==
In 2017, while she was still working at the bar, she met producer Chad Boccara, who gave her a chance after reading her lyrics. Colom decides to adopt Suzane as her stage name in honor of her grandmother and in 2018 she publishes her first two singles under her new pseudonym, "L'Insatisfait" and "La Flemme". That year she performed for the first time in public. Throughout 2019, she toured throughout the country, participating in 32 festivals (including the Festival des Vieilles Charrues) and performing more than 200 concerts, including some dates in China and Japan with the French Alliance. She became the French artist with the most performances in 2019, without having released an album until then.

In mid-2019 she signed with the 3e bureau record label, a subsidiary of Wagram Music, with which she released her first EP, Suzane. Two of the album's songs, "Suzane" and "Il est où le SAV?", had some success on the Internet. Her first studio album, titled Toï Toï, went on sale in early 2020. The title of the album refers to a German expression that brings good luck and contains fifteen tracks with texts on feminist and environmentalist themes. Suzane received great media enthusiasm, becoming the "sensation artist" of 2020. She performed as a headliner at the Olympia in Paris and at Le Trianon, in addition to being awarded "Best New Artist" at the 35th Victoires de la Musique ceremony.

In 2021, Suzane published a reissue of Toï Toï, which features new singles, including "Pendant 24 h" with Grand Corps Malade and "La Vie dolce" with DJ Feder. During the next few months, she continued with the tour while composing new songs for her second album, Caméo, released on November 4, 2022. Her three promotional singles were "Clit Is Good", " Belladona" and "A ticket pour la Lune".

== Personal life ==
Suzane came out of the closet during her adolescence, being openly lesbian since high school. She is an environmentalist and feminist activist, committed to the #NousToutes collective. In the 2017 presidential election, she voted blank and explained that she had not found a candidate "who really listened to the people."

== Discography ==
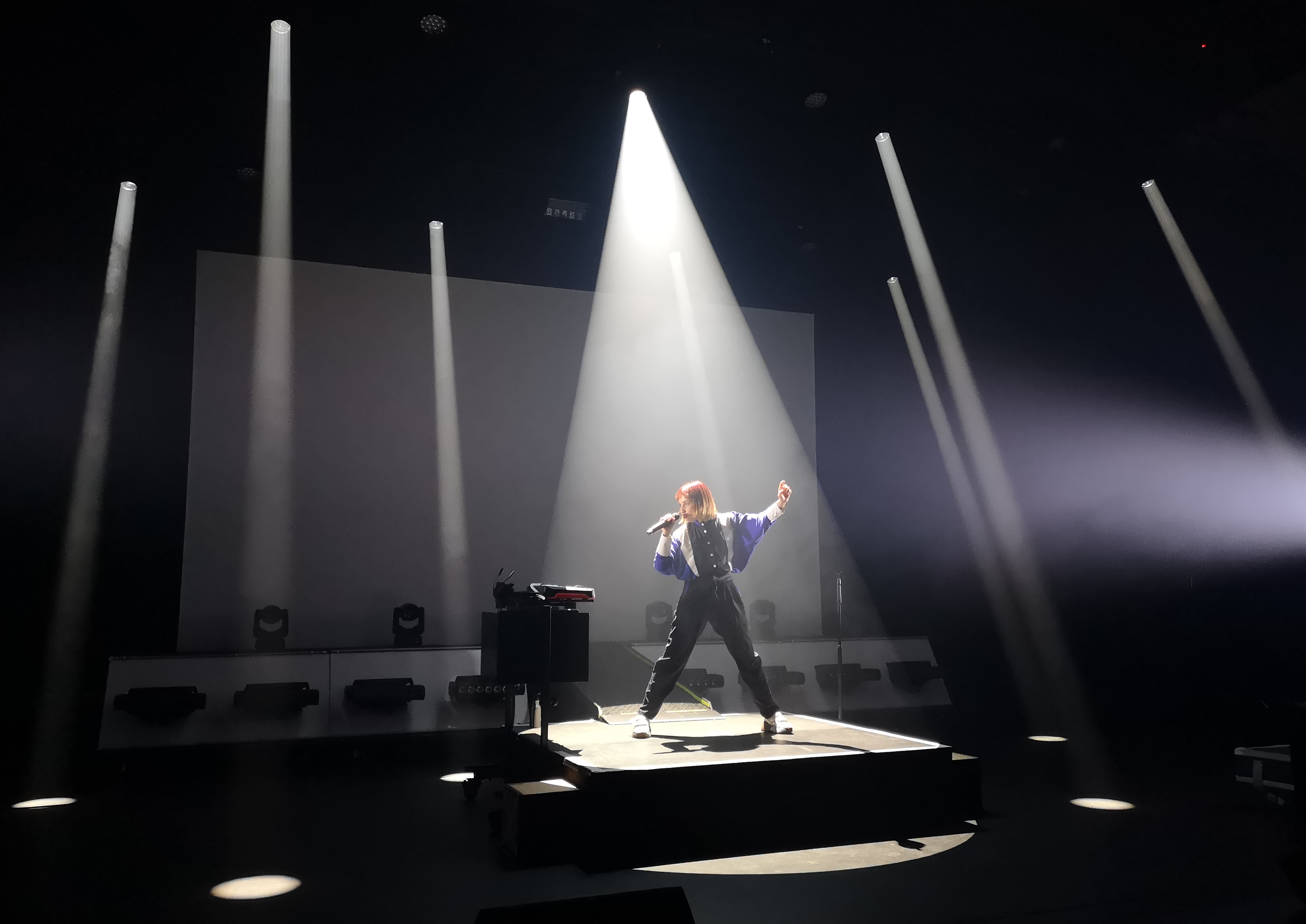
Suzane à l'Espace 93 de Clichy-sous-Bois, en 2020.

=== Studio albums ===
- Toï Toï (Faubourg26 / 3^{e} Bureau, 2020)
- Toï Toï II (Nouvelle édition) Faubourg26 / 3^{e} Bureau, 2021

=== EP ===
Suzane 3^{e} Bureau / Faubourg26, 2019)

=== Singles ===
- 2018 : "L'Insatisfait"
- 2018 : "La flemme"
- 2019 : "Suzane"
- 2019 : "SLT"
- 2019 : "Laisse tomber les filles – Souvenirs d'été" (reprise de France Gall)
- 2019 : "Il est où le SAV ?" (feat. Témé Tan)
- 2020 : "L'Appart vide"
- 2021 : "La Vie dolce" (feat. Feder)

=== Participation ===
- 2020 : "Pendant 24h ", duet with Grand Corps Malade, on the album Mesdames, later featured on Toï Toï II

== Awards and nominations ==
Award Ceremony	Year	Work	Category	Result
Berlin Music Video Awards	2020	SLT	Best Art Director	Nominated
Berlin Music Video Awards	2023	CLIT IS GOOD	Best Director	Nominated
