= Maëlle =

French singer (born 2001)

Maëlle Maëlle Pistoia
- Born: 4 January 2001 (age 25); Tournus, France
- Occupation: Singer
- Label: Mercury Music Group (Universal Music France)

Maëlle Pistoia (born 4 January 2001), better known as simply Maëlle, is a French singer. She is the winner of the seventh season of the French version of the talent show The Voice. In April 2019, she released her debut single, titled "Toutes les machines ont un cœur" (lit. "All machines have a heart").

== Biography ==
Born in January 2001, Maëlle Pistoia is from Tournus in the department of Saône-et-Loire, Burgundy. She has two older sisters. In her childhood she studied piano.

=== 2018: The Voice ===
Maëlle's musical career started in 2017, when she submitted a video audition for the seventh edition of the French version of The Voice and became a contestant.

At her blind audition, she performed Guillaume Grand's "Toi et moi", accompanying herself on piano. Three of the four judges, Florent Pagny, Zazie, and Mika turned their chairs. Maëlle chose Zazie as her coach.

For the final audition, she sang Chris Isaak's "Wicked Game".

During the duels, Maëlle battled Gulaan singing Sting's "Fragile", and it was she who Zazie chose to advance to the live rounds.

During the first live round, she sang Korgis' "Everybody's Got to Learn Sometime" and was "saved" by the public. In the quarterfinals, she sang London Grammar's "Wasting My Young Years" and was "saved" by the public.

In the semifinal, she sang France Gall's "Diego libre dans sa tête" and was chosen by the public for the final over B. Demi Mondaine.

In the final held on 12 May 2018, Maëlle performed first Harry Styles' "Sign of the Times", then Vianney's "Je m'en vais" in duo with him, and finally Michel Berger's "Seras-tu là" in duo with Zazie. She won the final with 55,3 % of the public vote, becoming the first female and, at 17 years of age, the youngest candidate to ever win the French talent show.

On 14 July 2018, in Louhans, Maëlle gave her first public concert.

=== 2019: First single and first album ===
On 5 April 2019, Maëlle released her debut single. Titled "Toutes les machines ont un cœur", it was composed by Calogero (who also produced the recording), with lyrics by Zazie. Three days before her BAC (in Social & Economics Sciences, or SES), she was in Barcelona shooting the music video for this song. Directed by Nur Casadevall, it premiered on YouTube on 29 July 2019.

On 6 September 2019, Maëlle released (on YouTube) a music video for a live version of another track from her forthcoming album, a song titled "L'Effet de masse". The song entered the French download chart at number 68 (during the week of 13 September).

On 23 September 2019, she released (on YouTube) a music video for yet another new song from her upcoming album, "Le Pianiste des gares".

At the end of September, Maëlle was nominated for the 2019 NRJ Music Award in the category "French Revelation of the Year".

On 4 October 2019, she released (on YouTube) a music video for the song "Sur un coup de tête". The song entered the French download chart at number 75 (during the week of 11 October).

Her debut album, titled simply Maëlle, was released on 22 November 2019. The entire album was composed and produced by Calogero.

== Discography ==
=== Albums ===
Title	Details	Charts				Certification
Title	Details	FRA	BEL (Wa)	SWI	SWI (Rom)	Certification
Maëlle	Released: 22 November 2019; Label: Mercury Music Group	19	20	25	10	SNEP: Gold
Fil rouge	Released: 29 September 2023; Label: Polydor	—	105	—	—	

=== Singles ===
Title	Year	Charts			Album	Certification
Title	Year	FRA	BEL (Wa)	SWI (Rom)	Album	Certification
"Toutes les machines ont un cœur"	2019	148	Tip: 17	12	Maëlle	SNEP: Platinum

=== Other charted songs ===
Title	Year	Charts	Certification	Album
Title	Year	FRA DL	Certification	Album
"Le Mot d'absence"	2019	90		Maëlle
"L'Effet de masse"	2019	68	SNEP: Gold	Maëlle
"Sur un coup de tête"	2019	75		Maëlle

== Awards and nominations ==
=== NRJ Music Awards ===
Year	Nominee / work	Award	Result
2019	Maëlle	French Revelation of the Year	Nominated

Awards and achievements
Preceded by Lisandro Cuxi	The Voice: la plus belle voix Winner; 2018	Succeeded by Whitney Marin
