= Lilian Renaud =

French singer (born 1991)

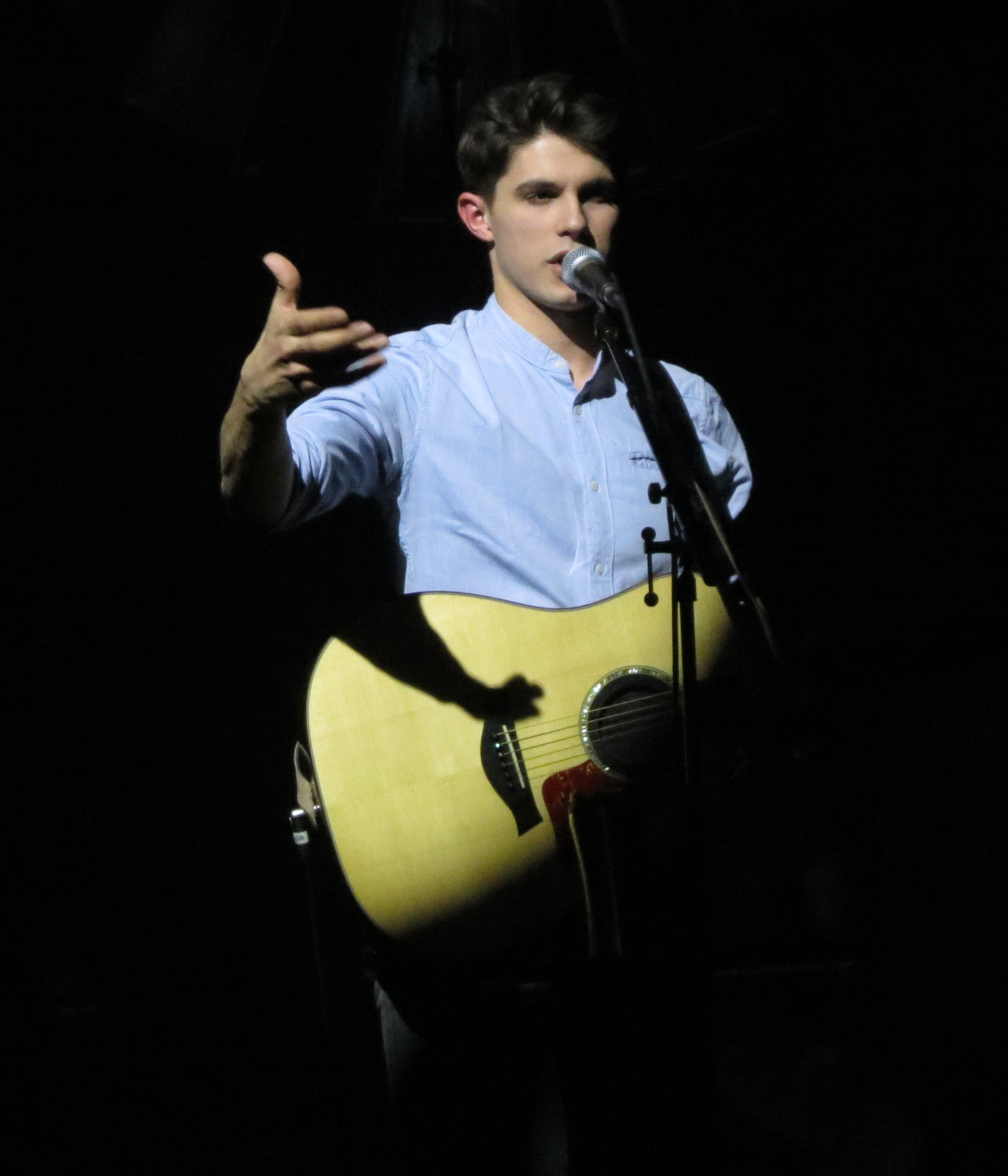

Background information
- Born: October 11, 1991 (age 35); Mamirolle, France
- Occupation: Singer
- Instrument: Vocals
- Years active: 2015–present

Lilian Renaud (born 11 October 1991 in Mamirolle, département du Doubs, France) is a French singer who won the title in Season 4 of the French music competition The Voice: la plus belle voix broadcast on TF1 from 10 January 2015 to 25 April 2015.

== Discography ==
=== Albums ===
- 2015: Le bruit de l'aube
- 2016: Le cœur qui cogne
- 2019: Lilian Renaud
- 2021: Dans un moment de bonheur

=== Singles ===
- 2015: Promis juré
- 2015: Il faudra vivre
- 2015: Pour ne plus avoir peur
- 2015: Si tu cherches de l'or
- 2016: Savoir dire merci
- 2016: Imagine
- 2018: Les rêves (on repousse le vent)
- 2019: On en verra encore
- 2019: Quoi de plus beau
- 2021: Who do you love
- 2021: Combien d'airs
- 2023: C'est ta chance

Preceded by Kendji Girac	The Voice: la plus belle voix Winner; 2015	Succeeded by Slimane Nebchi
