= Nikos Aliagas =

Greek-French journalist, philosopher and entertainer (Born 1969)

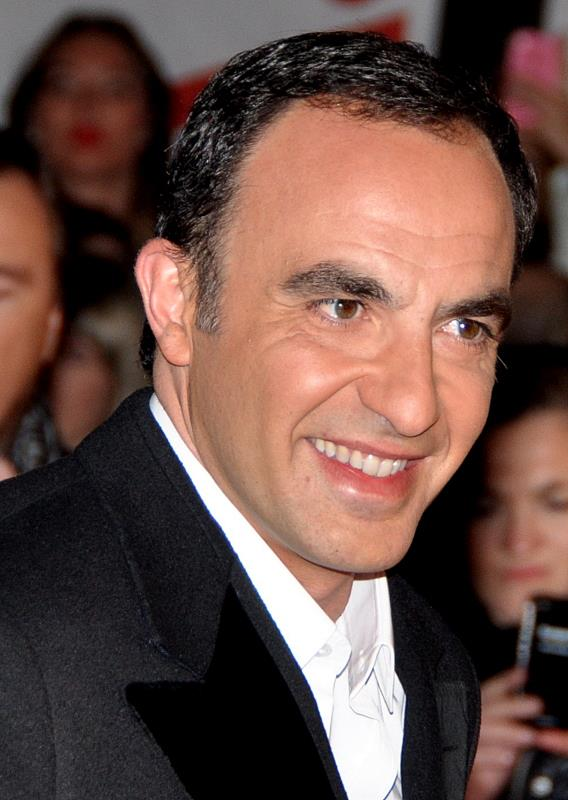
- Nikos Aliagas in 2013
- Born: Nikólaos Aliágas; 13 May 1969 (age 56); Paris, France
- Occupation: TV host of The Voice
- Employer: TF1

Nikos Aliagas (Greek: Νικόλαος "Νίκος" Αλιάγας, Nikólaos "Níkos" Aliágas; born 13 May 1969) is a Greek-French journalist and entertainer, known for being the host of the French reality program Star Academy and The Voice – La plus belle voix.

== Biography ==
Both of his parents, Andreas and Harula Aliagas are Greek. His father comes from the area of Stamna in Aetolia-Acarnania while his mother comes from Messolonghi, located in the same regional unit in Greece. He lived between France and Greece during his childhood.

He was a guest star on a Greek program Koita ti Ekanes in late-2003 and featured clips from Star Academy. He has published a book called I was born Greek: The mythology or The school of life (Greek: Γεννήθηκα Έλληνας: Η Μυθολογία Ή Το Σχολείο Της Ζωής). He was the presenter of a show on Alpha TV called Gros Plan where he met international stars like Celine Dion, Jean Paul Gaultier, Sylvester Stallone and Helena Paparizou. He is the French presenter of The Voice: la plus belle voix.

He is multilingual, being able to speak French, Greek, English, Spanish and Italian.
