= Moldova in the Eurovision Song Contest 2016 =

- Eurovision Song Contest 2016
- Participating broadcaster: TeleRadio-Moldova (TRM)
- Country: Moldova
- Selection process: O melodie pentru Europa 2016
- Selection date: 27 February 2016

Competing entry
- Song: "Falling Stars"
- Artist: Lidia Isac
- Songwriters: Gabriel Alares; Sebastian Lestapier; Ellen Berg; Leonid Gutkin

Placement
- Semi-final result: Failed to qualify (17th)

Participation chronology

Moldova was represented at the Eurovision Song Contest 2016 with the song "Falling Stars" written by Gabriel Alares, Sebastian Lestapier, Ellen Berg and Leonid Gutkin. The song was performed by Lidia Isac. The Moldovan broadcaster TeleRadio-Moldova (TRM) organised the national final O melodie pentru Europa 2016 in order to select the Moldovan entry for the 2016 contest in Stockholm, Sweden. 47 entries competed to represent Moldova in Stockholm, with 24 being shortlisted to participate in the televised national final after auditioning in front of a jury panel. After two semi-finals and a final which took place in February 2016, "Falling Stars" performed by Lidia Isac emerged as the winner after gaining the most points following the combination of votes from a jury panel and a public televote.

Moldova was drawn to compete in the first semi-final of the Eurovision Song Contest which took place on 10 May 2016. Performing during the show in position 3, "Falling Stars" was not announced among the top 10 entries of the first semi-final and therefore did not qualify to compete in the final. It was later revealed that Moldova placed seventeenth out of the 18 participating countries in the semi-final with 33 points.

== Background ==
Prior to the 2016 Contest, Moldova had participated in the Eurovision Song Contest eleven times since its first entry in 2005. The nation's best placing in the contest was sixth, which it achieved in 2005 with the song "Boonika bate doba" performed by Zdob și Zdub. Other than their debut entry, to this point, Moldova's only other top ten placing at the contest was achieved in 2007 where "Fight" performed by Natalia Barbu placed tenth. In the 2015 contest, "I Want Your Love" performed by Eduard Romanyuta failed to qualify Moldova to compete in the final.

The Moldovan national broadcaster, TeleRadio-Moldova (TRM), broadcast the event within Moldova and organised the selection process for the nation's entry. TRM confirmed their intentions to participate at the 2016 Eurovision Song Contest on 13 October 2015. Moldova has selected their entry via a national selection show since 2008, a procedure that was continued for their 2016 participation.

== Before Eurovision ==
=== O melodie pentru Europa 2016 ===
O melodie pentru Europa 2016 was the national final format developed by TRM in order to select Moldova's entry for the Eurovision Song Contest 2016. The event included two semi-finals and a final to be held on 23, 25 and 27 February 2016, respectively. All shows in the competition were broadcast on Moldova 1, Radio Moldova Actualități, Radio Moldova Tineret and Radio Moldova Muzical as well as online via the broadcaster's official website trm.md. The final was broadcast online at the official Eurovision Song Contest website eurovision.tv.

==== Format ====
The selection of the competing entries for the national final and ultimately the Moldovan Eurovision entry was initially planned to take place over three rounds. The first round was scheduled to occur on 10 December 2015 where a jury panel was supposed to shortlist fifty entries from the received submissions. Since only 47 valid entries were received at the submission deadline, this round of the selection was cancelled. The second round was a live audition of the 47 entries in front of a jury panel that took place on 19 December 2015. Entries were assessed on criteria such as voice quality, stage presence and strength of the composition. The panel selected 24 semi-finalists to proceed to the third round, the televised national final. 12 semi-finalists competed in each semi-final on 23 and 25 February 2016. Eight songs qualified to the final from each semi-final; seven of the qualifiers qualified based on the combined votes from an expert jury and public televoting results, while the eighth qualifier in each semi-final was the entry that achieved the highest televote score from the remaining entries after a second round of public televoting took place during an after-show. The sixteen qualifying entries competed in the final on 27 February 2016 where the winner was selected by the 50/50 combination of an expert jury vote and a public televote. In the event of a tie, the entry that receives the highest score from the expert jury vote was declared the winner.

==== Competing entries ====
Artists and composers had the opportunity to submit their entries between 13 October 2015 and 7 December 2015. Rules from the 2015 edition that allowed for international artists to apply were modified, allowing an international act to compete only if they were part of a duo or group where 50% of the lead vocalists were of Moldovan nationality. Songwriters could hold any nationality. Artists could submit more than one song, however, if they were chosen as a semi-finalist with more than one song, the artist would have to choose one entry to continue with in the competition. At the conclusion of the submission deadline, 47 valid entries were received by the broadcaster.

The live audition round took place on 19 December 2015 at TRM Studio 2 in Chișinău where 24 semi-finalists were selected to advance. The jury panel that evaluated the songs during the live auditions and selected the 24 semi-finalists consisted of Petre Toma (musician), Valeria Barbas (singer and composer), Andriano Marian (conductor of the Youth Orchestra), Ruslan Țăranu (singer and composer) and Luminița Dumbrăveanu (lyricist). During the auditions, the group Elle was allowed by the jury to sing a second song "Extaz", which had not been sent to the broadcaster during the submission period, due to one of their original group members having withdrawn from participation. Alexandru Ceapă did not attend the auditions and therefore his song "Viorele" was disqualified. The 24 semi-finalists were allocated to one of the two semi-finals, each containing 12 entries, in a draw that was held on 11 February 2016 at TRM Headquarters in Chișinău.

On 1 February 2016, "Imagine" performed by Katherine and the 2012 Belarusian Eurovision entrants Litesound was withdrawn from the competition and replaced with the song "Va fi târziu" performed by Valentina Nejel. On 15 February, "Tare" by Elle was withdrawn and replaced by Vitalie Todirașcu and his song "Belladonna"; 2007 Moldovan Eurovision entrant Natalia Barbu was part of the group Elle.

Artist	Song	Songwriter(s)
Andrei Ioniță and Onoffrei	"Lie"	Andrei Ioniță, Ion Onofrei
Anna Gulko	"Never Let Go"	Will Taylor, Georgios Kalpakidis, Nikos Sofis
Beatrice	"Saved My Heart for You"	Nicklas Säwström, Christian Löwenborg Wahlström
Big Flash Sound	"Când vrei"	Big Flash Sound, Virgil Carianopol
Che-MD	"Vodă e cu noi"	Mihail Smolenco
Chris Maroo	"Tonight"	Smally, Gloria Gorceag
Chriss Jeff	"Good Life"	Andrei Mihai, Elena Moroșanu, Dorian Micu
Cristina Pintilie	"Picture of Love"	Alex Calancea, Ana Colesnicov
Diana Brescan	"Till the End"	Niklas Pettersson, André Zuniga
Doinița Gherman	"Irresistible"	Ylva Persson, Linda Persson
DoReDoS	"FunnyFolk"	Ion Moraru, Lidia Scarlat
Elle	"Tare"	Youbesc Sound, Tania Cerga, Alla Donțu
Emilia Russu	"I Am Not the Same"	Smally, Gloria Gorceag
Felicia Dunaf	"You and Me"	Smally, Gloria Gorceag
Katherine and Litesound	"Imagine"	Dmitry Karyakin, Vladimir Karyakin
Lidia Isac	"Falling Stars"	Gabriel Alares, Sebastian Lestapier, Ellen Berg, Leonid Gutkin
Max Fall feat. Dan Vozniuc and Malloy	"Game Lover"	Dan Vozniuc, Maxim Bodiu
Maxim Zavidia	"La La Love"	Serghei Ialovițki, Daniel Murzac
Nadia Moșneagu	"Memories"	Valeriu Pașa, Elena Negruța
Priza	"Rewind"	Georgios Kalpakidis, Mickey Huskic
Rodica and Ivan Aculov	"Stop Lying"	Ivan Aculov, Lidia Scarlat
Valentin Uzun	"Mine"	Veaceslav Daniliuc, Daniela Mirzac
Valentina Nejel	"Va fi târziu"	Marian Stîrcea, Radmila Popovici-Paraschiv
Valeria Pașa	"Save Love"	Valeriu Pașa
Viola	"In the Name of Love"	Violeta Julea, Victoria Demici
Vitalie Todirașcu	"Belladonna"	Vitalie Todirașcu

==== Semi-finals ====
The two semi-finals took place on 23 and 25 February 2016 at TRM Studio 2 in Chișinău, hosted by Sergiu Beznițchi who was joined by Gloria Gorceag in the first semi-final and Mihaela Cârnov in the second semi-final. In each semi-final twelve acts competed and seven songs qualified to the final based on the combination of votes from a public televote and the votes of an expert jury, while an eighth qualifier was selected by an additional televote between the remaining non-qualifiers and was revealed during a post semi-final discussion show. The jury that voted in the semi-finals included Iurie Mahovici (composer), Valeria Barbas (composer, musicologist), Andriano Marian (conductor of the Youth Orchestra), Boris Cremene (actor), Geta Voinovan (singer-songwriter), Vladimir Beleaev (composer), Svetlana Gozun (dancer), Ruslan Țăranu (singer/composer), Angela Ciobanu (actress; first semi-final) and Ion Razza (singer; second semi-final).

In addition to the performances of the competing entries, 2013 Moldovan Eurovision entrant Aliona Moon and the ballet company Just Friends performed as guests in the first semi-final, while alternative rock band Gândul Mâței performed as a guest in the second semi-final.

First round (jury and televote) qualifier
Second round (televote-only) qualifier

Semi-final 1 – 23 February 2016
R/O	Artist	Song	Jury		Televote		Total	Place
R/O	Artist	Song	Votes	Points	Votes	Points	Total	Place
1	Doinița Gherman	"Irresistible"	73	10	442	7	17	3
2	Valentina Nejel	"Va fi târziu"	32	3	142	2	5	9
3	Valeria Pașa	"Save Love"	104	12	188	5	17	2
4	Emilia Russu	"I Am Not the Same"	37	5	151	3	8	8
5	Che-MD	"Vodă e cu noi"	23	1	505	8	9	7
6	Chris Maroo	"Tonight"	0	0	99	1	1	12
7	Valentin Uzun	"Mine"	21	0	508	10	10	6
8	Chriss Jeff	"Good Life"	36	4	30	0	4	10
9	DoReDoS	"FunnyFolk"	60	8	331	6	14	4
10	Viola	"In the Name of Love"	48	6	178	4	10	5
11	Maxim Zavidia	"La La Love"	59	7	689	12	19	1
12	Priza	"Rewind"	29	2	13	0	2	11

Detailed Jury Votes
R/O	Song	I. Mahovici	V. Barbas	A. Marian	B. Cremene	G. Voinovan	V. Beleaev	S. Gozun	R. Țăranu	A. Ciobanu	Total
1	"Irresistible"	4	7	5	10	10	10	7	10	10	73
2	"Va fi târziu"	3	4	1	3	2	5		8	6	32
3	"Save Love"	10	12	12	12	12	12	10	12	12	104
4	"I Am Not the Same"	1	6	6	5	1	3	1	7	7	37
5	"Vodă e cu noi"		3	2	2		2	6	5	3	23
6	"Tonight"										0
7	"Mine"	6	1	4		4	1	2	1	2	21
8	"Good Life"	5	2	3	1	5	7	4	4	5	36
9	"FunnyFolk"	12	8	8	4	8	8	12			60
10	"In the Name of Love"	7	10	7	6	6	4	5	2	1	48
11	"La La Love"	8	5	10	8	7	6	8	3	4	59
12	"Rewind"	2			7	3		3	6	8	29

Semi-final 2 – 25 February 2016
R/O	Artist	Song	Jury		Televote		Total	Place
R/O	Artist	Song	Votes	Points	Votes	Points	Total	Place
1	Rodica and Ivan Aculov	"Stop Lying"	42	4	1,041	10	14	5
2	Lidia Isac	"Falling Stars"	51	5	1,425	12	17	1
3	Cristina Pintilie	"Picture of Love"	62	7	402	7	14	4
4	Diana Brescan	"Till the End"	20	1	263	4	5	9
5	Max Fall feat. Dan Vozniuc and Malloy	"Game Lover"	71	8	579	8	16	3
6	Andrei Ioniță and Onoffrei	"Lie"	55	6	160	2	8	7
7	Felicia Dunaf	"You and Me"	24	2	302	5	7	8
8	Nadia Moșneagu	"Memories"	75	10	322	6	16	2
9	Big Flash Sound	"Când vrei"	75	12	74	0	12	6
10	Anna Gulko	"Never Let Go"	18	0	94	1	1	12
11	Beatrice	"Saved My Heart for You"	1	0	227	3	3	11
12	Vitalie Todirașcu	"Belladonna"	28	3	29	0	3	10

Detailed Jury Votes
R/O	Song	I. Mahovici	V. Barbas	A. Marian	B. Cremene	G. Voinovan	V. Beleaev	S. Gozun	R. Țăranu	I. Razza	Total
1	"Stop Lying"	5	4	5	2	4	8	7	2	5	42
2	"Falling Stars"	6	6	2	5	6	6	8	5	7	51
3	"Picture of Love"	8	8	7	7	8	7	5		12	62
4	"Till the End"	4					3	4	3	6	20
5	"Game Lover"	10	10	8	6	12	10	10	1	4	71
6	"Lie"	3	5	12	12	7	4	3	7	2	55
7	"You and Me"	1	3	4	3	2	2	2	4	3	24
8	"Memories"	7	12	10	8	5	5	6	12	10	75
9	"Când vrei"	12	7	6	10	10	12	12	6		75
10	"Never Let Go"		2	3	1			1	10	1	18
11	"Saved My Heart for You"					1					1
12	"Belladonna"	2	1	1	4	3	1		8	8	28

==== Final ====
The final took place on 27 February 2016 at TRM Studio 2 in Chișinău, hosted by Sergiu Beznițchi and Olivia Furtună. The sixteen songs that qualified from the preceding two semi-finals competed and the winner was selected based on the combination of a public televote and the votes of an expert jury. The jury that voted in the final included Iurie Mahovici (musician), Valeria Barbas (composer, musicologist), Andriano Marian (conductor of the Youth Orchestra), Boris Cremene (actor), Geta Voinovan (singer-songwriter), Ion Brătescu (leader of the National Opera and Ballet Theater), Svetlana Gozun (dancer), Paul Gămurari (lecturer and member of the Union of Composers and Musicologists in Moldova), Ion Razza (singer), Liviu Știrbu (composer) and Aliona Moon (singer, 2013 Moldovan Eurovision entrant). In addition to the performances of the competing entries, 2012 Moldovan Eurovision entrant Pasha Parfeny and the dance troupe Space performed as guests. "Falling Stars" performed by Lidia Isac was selected as the winner.

Final – 27 February 2016
R/O	Artist	Song	Jury		Televote		Total	Place
R/O	Artist	Song	Votes	Points	Votes	Points	Total	Place
1	Valentin Uzun	"Mine"	17	0	2,481	6	6	8
2	Maxim Zavidia	"La La Love"	66	7	2,573	7	14	5
3	Doinița Gherman	"Irresistible"	43	3	2,004	3	6	7
4	Lidia Isac	"Falling Stars"	67	8	8,362	12	20	1
5	Big Flash Sound	"Când vrei"	57	5	328	0	5	9
6	Che-MD	"Vodă e cu noi"	0	0	609	0	0	16
7	Andrei Ioniță and Onoffrei	"Lie"	28	1	290	0	1	12
8	Cristina Pintilie	"Picture of Love"	74	10	2,631	8	18	2
9	Nadia Moșneagu	"Memories"	26	0	673	1	1	13
10	Rodica and Ivan Aculov	"Stop Lying"	20	0	2,021	4	4	10
11	Emilia Russu	"I Am Not the Same"	5	0	142	0	0	15
12	Viola	"In the Name of Love"	35	2	440	0	2	11
13	DoReDoS	"FunnyFolk"	59	6	8,287	10	16	4
14	Max Fall feat. Dan Vozniuc and Malloy	"Game Lover"	46	4	1,972	2	6	6
15	Valeria Pașa	"Save Love"	86	12	2,185	5	17	3
16	Felicia Dunaf	"You and Me"	9	0	386	0	0	14

Detailed Jury Votes
R/O	Song	I. Mahovici	V. Barbas	A. Marian	B. Cremene	G. Voinovan	I. Brătescu	S. Gozun	P. Gamurari	I. Razza	L. Știrbu	A. Moon	Total
1	"Mine"						1	7	8	1			17
2	"La La Love"	8		8	6	4	3	4	5	10	10	8	66
3	"Irresistible"		1		4	10	5	5	4	4	7	3	43
4	"Falling Stars"	7	5	1	1	7	8	10		6	12	10	67
5	"Când vrei"	2	3	10	12	12	2	6	3	2		5	57
6	"Vodă e cu noi"												0
7	"Lie"			12	8	2						6	28
8	"Picture of Love"	12	12	3	2	1	7	3	10	12	8	4	74
9	"Memories"	5	8	5	3					5			26
10	"Stop Lying"		4				4	2	1	3	6		20
11	"I Am Not the Same"										5		5
12	"In the Name of Love"	6	6			3	6		2	8	4		35
13	"FunnyFolk"	4	2	2	10	5	12	8	6		3	7	59
14	"Game Lover"	3	7	4	5	6	10		7		2	2	46
15	"Save Love"	10	10	7	7	8		12	12	7	1	12	86
16	"You and Me"	1		6				1				1	9

=== Preparation ===
Following Romania's disqualification from the contest on 22 April, TRM and Lidia Isac's team extended an invitation for the Romanian entrant, Ovidiu Anton, to join her on stage during her performance. Anton responded to the invitation in gratitude but declined the offer.

On 29 April, Lidia Isac was a guest during the Moldova 1 programme Bună dimineaţa where she premiered the official music video for "Falling Stars".

=== Promotion ===
Lidia Isac made several appearances across Europe to specifically promote "Falling Stars" as the Moldovan Eurovision entry. On 6 March, Lidia Isac performed the Moldovan entry as a guest during the final of the Romanian Eurovision national final. On 3 April, Isac performed during the Eurovision Pre-Party, which was held at the Izvestia Hall in Moscow, Russia and hosted by Dmitry Guberniev. On 9 April, Isac performed during the Eurovision in Concert event which was held at the Melkweg venue in Amsterdam, Netherlands and hosted by Cornald Maas and Hera Björk. Between 11 and 13 April, Lidia Isac took part in promotional activities in Tel Aviv, Israel and performed during the Israel Calling event held at the Ha'teatron venue.

== At Eurovision ==
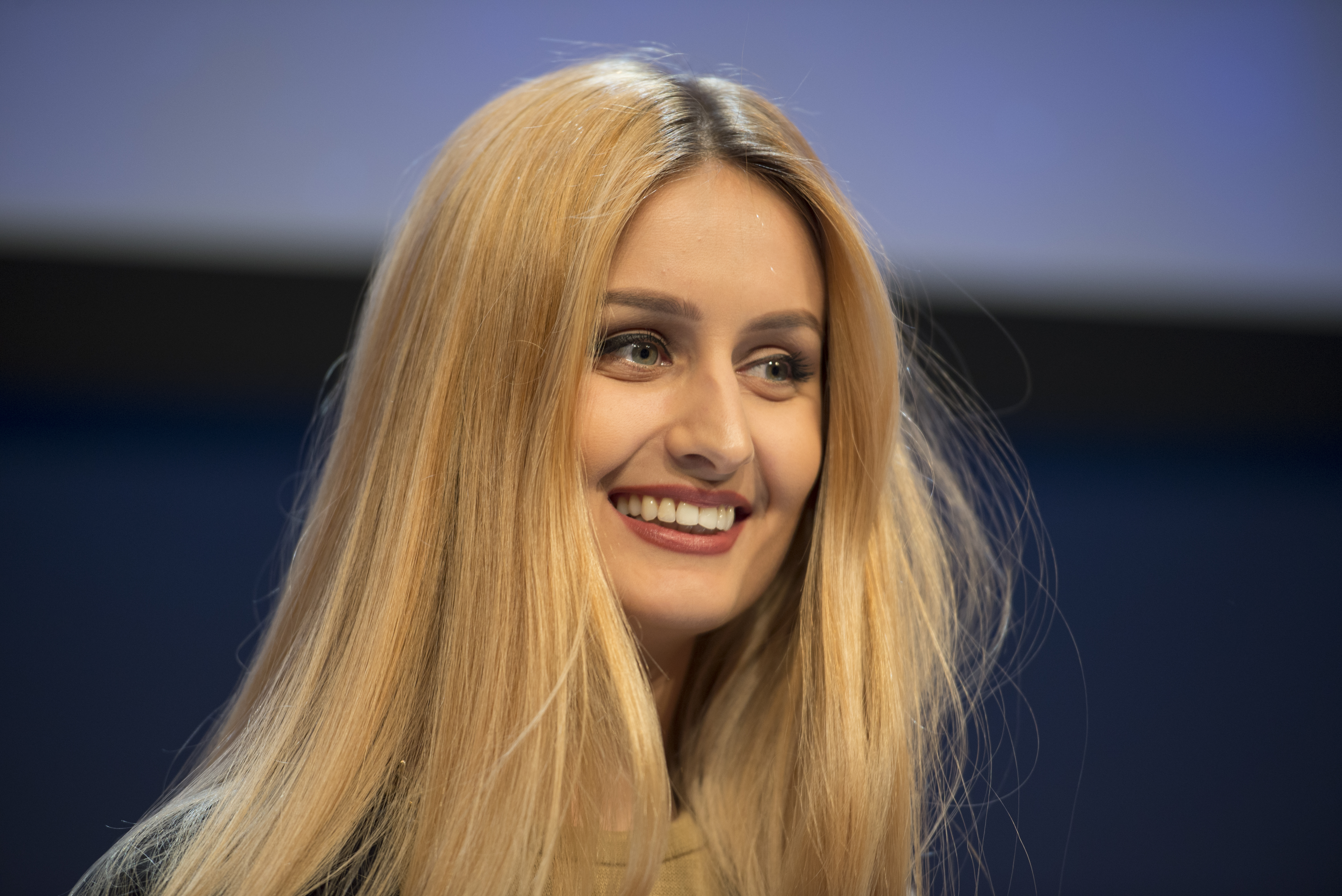
Lidia Isac during a press meet and greet

According to Eurovision rules, all nations with the exceptions of the host country and the "Big Five" (France, Germany, Italy, Spain and the United Kingdom) are required to qualify from one of two semi-finals in order to compete for the final; the top ten countries from each semi-final progress to the final. The European Broadcasting Union (EBU) split up the competing countries into six different pots based on voting patterns from previous contests, with countries with favourable voting histories put into the same pot. On 25 January 2016, a special allocation draw was held which placed each country into one of the two semi-finals, as well as which half of the show they would perform in. Moldova was placed into the first semi-final, to be held on 10 May 2016, and was scheduled to perform in the first half of the show.

Once all the competing songs for the 2016 contest had been released, the running order for the semi-finals was decided by the shows' producers rather than through another draw, so that similar songs were not placed next to each other. Moldova was set to perform in position 3, following the entry from Greece and before the entry from Hungary.

The two semi-finals and the final were televised in Moldova on Moldova 1 as well as broadcast via radio on Radio Moldova, Radio Moldova Muzical and Radio Moldova Tineret. All broadcasts featured commentary by Gloria Gorceag. The Moldovan spokesperson, who announced the top 12-point score awarded by the Moldovan jury during the final, was Olivia Furtună.

=== Semi-final ===
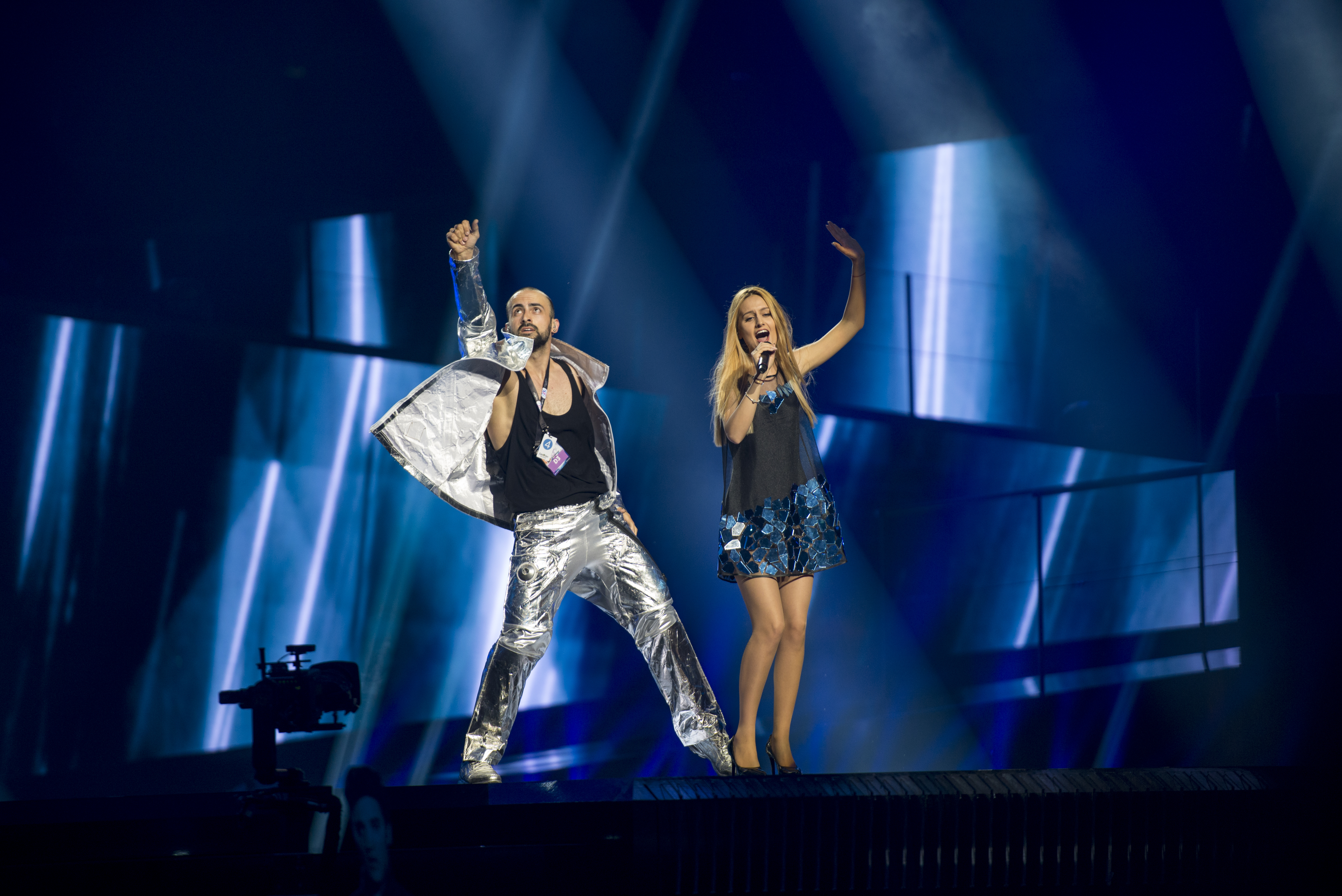
Lidia Isac during a rehearsal before the first semi-final

Lidia Isac took part in technical rehearsals on 2 and 6 May, followed by dress rehearsals on 9 and 10 May. This included the jury show on 9 May where the professional juries of each country watched and voted on the competing entries.

The Moldovan performance featured Lidia Isac dressed in a short black dress with small metallic blue mirror pieces and performing a choreographed routine on stage with one dancer, who was dressed like a cosmonaut. The stage featured light and dark blue lighting and LED screen projections of blue effects and falling stars. The dancer that joined Isac on stage is Iuri Rîbac. Lidia Isac was also joined by two off-stage backing vocalists: Ellen Berg and Gabriel Alares. During the rehearsals, Lidia Isac and the Moldovan delegation considered performing a portion of the song in French, however, the song was ultimately performed entirely in English.

At the end of the show, Moldova was not announced among the top 10 entries in the first semi-final and therefore failed to qualify to compete in the final. It was later revealed that Moldova placed seventeenth in the semi-final, receiving a total of 33 points: 9 points from the televoting and 24 points from the juries.

=== Voting ===
Voting during the three shows was conducted under a new system that involved each country now awarding two sets of points from 1-8, 10 and 12: one from their professional jury and the other from televoting. Each nation's jury consisted of five music industry professionals who are citizens of the country they represent, with their names published before the contest to ensure transparency. This jury judged each entry based on: vocal capacity; the stage performance; the song's composition and originality; and the overall impression by the act. In addition, no member of a national jury was permitted to be related in any way to any of the competing acts in such a way that they cannot vote impartially and independently. The individual rankings of each jury member as well as the nation's televoting results were released shortly after the grand final.

Below is a breakdown of points awarded to Moldova and awarded by Moldova in the first semi-final and grand final of the contest, and the breakdown of the jury voting and televoting conducted during the two shows:

==== Points awarded to Moldova ====
Points awarded to Moldova (Semi-final 1)
Score	Televote	Jury
12 points		
10 points		
8 points		
7 points		
6 points		Armenia; Russia
5 points	Russia	Azerbaijan
4 points		Malta
3 points		Greece
2 points	Cyprus; France	
1 point		

==== Points awarded by Moldova ====
Points awarded by Moldova (Semi-final 1)
Score	Televote	Jury
12 points	Azerbaijan	Russia
10 points	Russia	Armenia
8 points	Armenia	Czech Republic
7 points	Austria	Cyprus
6 points	Hungary	Malta
5 points	Malta	Croatia
4 points	San Marino	Netherlands
3 points	Czech Republic	Hungary
2 points	Croatia	Estonia
1 point	Estonia	Bosnia and Herzegovina

Points awarded by Moldova (Final)
Score	Televote	Jury
12 points	Russia	Ukraine
10 points	Ukraine	Australia
8 points	Azerbaijan	Spain
7 points	Armenia	Russia
6 points	France	Sweden
5 points	Australia	Armenia
4 points	Austria	Lithuania
3 points	Lithuania	Malta
2 points	Bulgaria	Cyprus
1 point	Latvia	Croatia

==== Detailed voting results ====
The following members comprised the Moldovan jury:

- Iurie Mahovici (jury chairperson) – composer, professor
- Ion Brătescu – director
- Adriano Marian – director
- Lidia Scarlat – artist
- Georgeta Voinovan – composer

Detailed voting results from Moldova (Semi-final 1)
R/O	Country	Jury							Televote	
R/O	Country	I. Mahovici	I. Brătescu	A. Marian	L. Scarlat	G. Voinovan	Rank	Points	Rank	Points
01	Finland	11	15	12	10	13	14		13	
02	Greece	15	14	14	11	16	15		14	
03	Moldova									
04	Hungary	5	6	13	5	4	8	3	5	6
05	Croatia	9	8	8	1	6	6	5	9	2
06	Netherlands	10	2	2	7	12	7	4	11	
07	Armenia	2	3	9	4	1	2	10	3	8
08	San Marino	12	16	15	17	15	16		7	4
09	Russia	1	1	5	2	2	1	12	2	10
10	Czech Republic	8	7	1	3	5	3	8	8	3
11	Cyprus	4	4	10	6	3	4	7	15	
12	Austria	7	12	11	15	14	13		4	7
13	Estonia	13	5	3	8	8	9	2	10	1
14	Azerbaijan	6	13	16	12	11	12		1	12
15	Montenegro	17	17	17	16	17	17		16	
16	Iceland	16	11	6	14	9	11		17	
17	Bosnia and Herzegovina	14	10	7	13	10	10	1	12	
18	Malta	3	9	4	9	7	5	6	6	5

Detailed voting results from Moldova (Final)
R/O	Country	Jury							Televote	
R/O	Country	I. Mahovici	I. Brătescu	A. Marian	L. Scarlat	G. Voinovan	Rank	Points	Rank	Points
01	Belgium	22	8	16	16	19	16		15	
02	Czech Republic	13	26	6	6	12	12		26	
03	Netherlands	18	11	19	22	20	19		25	
04	Azerbaijan	19	25	26	25	24	26		3	8
05	Hungary	14	17	24	21	16	21		11	
06	Italy	8	22	20	20	21	20		13	
07	Israel	9	18	18	19	15	15		21	
08	Bulgaria	24	21	23	14	22	23		9	2
09	Sweden	4	9	5	5	7	5	6	12	
10	Germany	20	24	13	23	23	22		18	
11	France	23	7	14	24	17	17		5	6
12	Poland	21	20	22	26	18	24		14	
13	Australia	1	2	1	3	3	2	10	6	5
14	Cyprus	16	12	11	7	5	9	2	16	
15	Serbia	25	13	4	15	10	13		22	
16	Lithuania	6	6	12	8	11	7	4	8	3
17	Croatia	15	15	15	2	8	10	1	24	
18	Russia	3	3	10	9	4	4	7	1	12
19	Spain	12	4	3	4	6	3	8	17	
20	Latvia	17	16	21	10	14	14		10	1
21	Ukraine	2	1	2	1	1	1	12	2	10
22	Malta	7	10	9	13	9	8	3	19	
23	Georgia	26	23	25	12	26	25		23	
24	Austria	11	19	17	17	25	18		7	4
25	United Kingdom	10	14	7	18	13	11		20	
26	Armenia	5	5	8	11	2	6	5	4	7
