= Romania in the Eurovision Song Contest 2016 =

- Eurovision Song Contest 2016
- Participating broadcaster: Televiziunea Română (TVR)
- Country: Romania
- Selection process: Selecția Națională 2016
- Selection date: 6 March 2016

Competing entry
- Song: "Moment of Silence"
- Artist: Ovidiu Anton
- Songwriters: Ovidiu Anton

Placement
- Semi-final result: Disqualified

Participation chronology

Romania was set to be represented at the Eurovision Song Contest 2016 with the song "Moment of Silence" written and performed by Ovidiu Anton. The Romanian participating broadcaster, Televiziunea Română (TVR), organised the national final Selecția Națională 2016 in order to select its entry for the contest. However, the European Broadcasting Union (EBU) removed TVR from all EBU member services, including the contest, following repeated non-payment of debts on 22 April 2016. With TVR's inability to participate or broadcast the contest, the Romanian entry became ineligible to compete and was removed from the contest.

The national final consisted of two shows: a semi-final and a final. Twelve entries were selected to compete in the semi-final on 4 March 2016 where a five-member jury panel selected four entries to advance to the final, while a public vote selected an additional two entries to enter the final. The six qualifiers competed in the final on 6 March 2016 where "Moment of Silence" performed by Ovidiu Anton was selected as the winner entirely by a public vote.

== Background ==
Prior to the 2016 contest, Televiziunea Română (TVR) had participated in the Eurovision Song Contest representing Romania 17 times since its first entry in 1994. To this point, its highest placing in the contest has been third place, achieved on two occasions: in 2005 with the song "Let Me Try" performed by Luminița Anghel and Sistem, and in 2010 with the song "Playing with Fire" performed by Paula Seling and Ovi. To this point, Romania has qualified to the final on every occasion since the introduction of semi-finals to the format of the contest in 2004. In 2015, "De la capăt" by band Voltaj placed 15th in the final.

As part of its duties as participating broadcaster, TVR organises the selection of its entry in the Eurovision Song Contest and broadcasts the event in the country. The broadcaster has consistently selected the entry through national finals that feature a competition among several artists and songs. TVR confirmed its intentions to participate at the 2016 contest on 7 September 2015. TVR opted again to select its 2016 entry through a national final.

== Before Eurovision ==
=== Selecția Națională 2016 ===
Selecția Națională 2016 was the national final organised by TVR in order to select its entry for the Eurovision Song Contest 2016. The competition consisted of two shows: a semi-final featuring twelve songs and a final featuring six songs to be held on 4 and 6 March 2016, respectively. Both shows took place at the Sala Sporturilor in Baia Mare and were hosted by Cornel Ilie and Ioana Voicu with Ioana Anuța–Jo hosting segments from the green room. The producer of the competition was Iuliana Marciuc, who was also appointed as the head of the Romanian delegation at the Eurovision Song Contest, while the director of the shows was Dan Manoliu. The two shows were televised on TVR1, TVR HD, TVRi as well as online via the broadcaster's streaming service TVR+ and YouTube. The two shows were also broadcast in Moldova via the channel TVR Moldova. The official Eurovision Song Contest website eurovision.tv provided an online stream for the final of the competition.

==== Competing entries ====
TVR opened a submission period for artists and composers to submit their entries between 18 January 2016 and 7 February 2016. An expert committee reviewed the received submissions between 8 and 10 February 2016. The broadcaster received 94 submissions after the submission deadline passed. Each juror on the committee rated each song between 1 (lowest) and 10 (highest) based on criteria such as the melodic harmony and structure of the song, the orchestral arrangement, originality and stylistic diversity of the composition and sound and voice quality. After the combination of the jury votes, the top twelve entries that scored the highest were selected for the national final. The competing entries were announced during a press conference on 11 February 2016 held in the Media Room at the National Theatre in Bucharest and hosted by Iuliana Marciuc with the mayor of Baia Mare, Cătălin Cherecheș, in attendance. The press conference was televised on TVR2. Among the competing artists was Mihai Trăistariu, who represented Romania in 2006. TVR hosted a presentation evening at the Berăria H venue in Bucharest on 19 February where the running order for the semi-final was determined and the competing artists performed their songs live for the public.

On 17 February 2016, "Brand New Day", written by Martyn Baylay and Phil Bates and to have been performed by Hayley Evetts, was withdrawn from the competition and replaced with the song "Tu ești povestea" performed by Gașca de acasă. An additional back-up entry was selected in the event that another participant withdrew; the entry was "The Reason", written by Nora Deneș and performed by Nora Deneș and The Fridays.

Artist	Song	Songwriter(s)
Andra Olteanu	"Nai nai"	Andra Olteanu, Sever Selim
Doru Todoruț feat. Irina Baianț	"The Voice"	Doru Todoruț, Irina Baianț
Dream Walkers	"Let It Shine"	Cristian Faur
Florena	"Behind the Shadows"	Gabriel Huiban, Laurențiu Duță
Gașca de acasă	"Tu ești povestea"	Călin Ionce, Florin Pop, Glad Berindei
Irina Popa	"Letting Go"	Irina Popa, George Lazăr, Alexandru Tudor, Eduard Taraș
Jukebox	"Come On Everybody"	Jukebox
Mihai	"Paradisio"	Mihai Trăistariu, Robby G., Dumi Pădure
Mihai Băjinaru	"Never Too Late"	Andrei Tudor, Cristian Faur
Ovidiu Anton	"Moment of Silence"	Ovidiu Anton
Vanotek feat. The Code and Georgian	"I'm Coming Home"	Vanotek, Ionuț Catană, Alex Cotoi, Sorin Seniuc, Adriana Rusu, Anastasia Sandu
Xandra	"Superhuman"	Will Taylor, Jonas Gladnikoff

==== Semi-final ====
The semi-final took place on 4 March 2016. Twelve songs competed and six qualified to the final. A jury panel first selected four songs to advance. The remaining eight entries then faced a public televote which determined an additional two qualifiers. The members of the jury panel that voted during the semi-final were: Alexandra Cepraga (music director), Horia Moculescu (composer, producer), Randi (singer, producer), Zoli Toth (musician, represented Romania in 2005 as part of Sistem) and Cezar Ouatu (countertenor, represented Romania in 2013). In addition to the performances of the competing entries, the interval acts featured performances from the show hosts Cornel Ilie with his band Vunk, Ioana Voicu and Ioana Anuța–Jo.

Jury qualifier Public vote qualifier

Semi-final (First round) – 4 March 2016
R/O	Artist	Song	Jury Votes					Total	Place
R/O	Artist	Song	Randi	C. Ouatu	A. Cepraga	Z. Toth	H. Moculescu	Total	Place
1	Doru Todoruț feat. Irina Baianț	"The Voice"	4	5	7	8	8	32	5
2	Andra Olteanu	"Nai nai"	1	1		2	1	5	11
3	Dream Walkers	"Let It Shine"	10	10	10	5	12	47	2
4	Irina Popa	"Letting Go"	5	4	2	1		12	8
5	Jukebox	"Come On Everybody"	6	6	3	7	5	27	6
6	Mihai Băjinaru	"Never Too Late"						0	12
7	Vanotek feat. The Code and Georgian	"I'm Coming Home"	3	3	4	4	4	18	7
8	Mihai	"Paradisio"	7	7	6	6	7	33	4
9	Florena	"Behind the Shadows"	12	8	8	10	6	44	3
10	Gașca de acasă	"Tu ești povestea"			5	3	2	10	9
11	Ovidiu Anton	"Moment of Silence"	8	12	12	12	10	54	1
12	Xandra	"Superhuman"	2	2	1		3	8	10

Semi-final (Second round) – 4 March 2016
Artist	Song	Televote	Place
Andra Olteanu	"Nai nai"	111	8
Doru Todoruț feat. Irina Baianț	"The Voice"	852	2
Gașca de acasă	"Tu ești povestea"	237	6
Irina Popa	"Letting Go"	196	7
Jukebox	"Come On Everybody"	333	5
Mihai Băjinaru	"Never Too Late"	337	4
Vanotek feat. The Code and Georgian	"I'm Coming Home"	984	1
Xandra	"Superhuman"	563	3

==== Final ====
The final took place on 6 March 2016. Six songs competed and the winner, "Moment of Silence" performed by Ovidiu Anton, was selected exclusively by public televoting. In addition to the performances of the competing entries, the interval acts featured performances by Paula Seling (who represented Romania in 2010 and in 2014), Lidia Isac (who represented Moldova in 2016) performing her Eurovision entry "Falling Stars", as well as performances by the members of the jury panel from the semi-final; among their performances, Zoli TOTH Project presented a performance titled "Cocoon", Horia Moculescu, Randi and Uddi performed the song "Vagabondul vieții mele" and Cezar Ouatu performed "Rise Like a Phoenix", the song which won Eurovision for Austria in 2014.

Final – 6 March 2016
R/O	Artist	Song	Televote	Place
1	Florena	"Behind the Shadows"	3,491	3
2	Doru Todoruț feat. Irina Baianț	"The Voice"	1,235	6
3	Dream Walkers	"Let It Shine"	2,332	4
4	Vanotek feat. The Code and Georgian	"I'm Coming Home"	4,702	2
5	Ovidiu Anton	"Moment of Silence"	6,585	1
6	Mihai	"Paradisio"	2,142	5

=== Promotion ===
Ovidiu Anton made several appearances across Europe to specifically promote "Moment of Silence" as the Romanian Eurovision entry. On 9 April, Ovidiu Anton performed during the Eurovision in Concert event which was held at the Melkweg venue in Amsterdam, Netherlands and hosted by Cornald Maas and Hera Björk. Between 11 and 13 April, Ovidiu Anton took part in promotional activities in Tel Aviv, Israel and performed during the Israel Calling event held at the Ha'teatron venue. On 17 April, Ovidiu Anton performed during the London Eurovision Party, which was held at the Café de Paris venue in London, United Kingdom and hosted by Nicki French and Paddy O'Connell.

== TVR withdrawal from EBU services ==
On 22 April 2016, the EBU announced that TVR was withdrawn from all EBU member services following the repeated non-payment of debts. The withdrawal disqualified TVR from participating and broadcasting the Eurovision Song Contest 2016 and therefore made the selected Romanian entry ineligible to compete. TVR had a deadline until 20 April to pay their debts totaling CHF 16 million to the EBU to avoid disqualification. EBU General Director Ingrid Deltenre stated: "It is regrettable that we are forced to take this action. We are disappointed that all our attempts to resolve this matter have received no response from the Romanian government. In recent weeks the EBU has taken note of the Ministry of Finance’s suggestion that TVR may be placed into insolvency proceedings which may in turn lead to a profound restructuring of the broadcaster. The EBU is a not-for-profit association which represents 73 Public Service Broadcasters in 56 countries. The continued indebtedness of TVR jeopardizes the financial stability of the EBU itself."

Romania, originally set to perform in position 12 in the second semi-final of the contest on 12 May 2016, was removed from the running order for the competition. The EBU confirmed that the Romanian entry, already released on the official compilation album for the contest, would continue to be made available for digital download and streaming as a courtesy to the artist and that all accredited press from Romania would retain their accreditation under the International Delegation of press and fans from non-participating countries. The Executive Supervisor for the Eurovision Song Contest, Jon Ola Sand, commented: "This is of course disappointing for the artist chosen to represent Romania, for our colleagues at TVR who have prepared their participation so well this year and, not least, for Romanian viewers and the many Eurovision fans in the country. As with all participants, SVT has been preparing for Romania's act thoroughly over the past weeks. To take an act out at such late stage is of course a little disruptive, but it will not negatively affect the 2016 Eurovision Song Contest in any other way."
