= Moment of Silence (song) =

2016 song by Ovidiu Anton

Song by Ovidiu Anton
- Released: 2016
- Genre: Gothic rock
- Length: 2:59
- Songwriter(s): Ovidiu Anton
- Producer(s): Liviu Sorescu

Eurovision Song Contest 2016 entry
- Country: Romania
- Artist(s): Ovidiu Anton
- Languages: English
- Composer(s): Ovidiu Anton
- Lyricist(s): Ovidiu Anton

Finals performance
- Final result: Disqualified

Entry chronology
- ◄ "De la capăt" (2015)
- "Yodel It!" (2017) ►

"Moment of Silence" is a song recorded by Romanian singer Ovidiu Anton. It was written and composed by himself, while production was handled by Liviu Sorescu. A gothic-inspired pop rock track featuring an electric guitar solo throughout, "Moment of Silence" acts as a homage to the victims of the 2015 Colectiv nightclub fire. It received mixed reviews from music critics, with one likening it to the works of Swedish band Europe. At the 2017 Radio România Actualități Awards, the track won in the Best Pop Rock Song category.

Winning the Romanian pre-selection show Selecția Națională, "Moment of Silence" was selected to represent the country at the Eurovision Song Contest 2016 in Stockholm, Sweden. However, Romania was forced to withdraw from the contest due to defaulted payments by the nation's broadcaster, TVR. Anton had promoted his intended Eurovision participation with live performances in Amsterdam and London, as well as on native Românii au talent. On 14 July 2016, "Moment of Silence" was digitally released as a single through Roton. It also received a music video, which was uploaded onto the label's YouTube channel the day prior.

== Background and reception ==
Premiered on his YouTube channel on 8 February 2016, "Moment of Silence" was written and composed by Ovidiu Anton, while production was handled by Liviu Sorescu. Although withdrawn from the Eurovision Song Contest 2016, it was featured on the contest's official compilation, Eurovision Song Contest: Stockholm 2016, released on 15 April 2016. "Moment of Silence" is a "song of the soul, for the souls", acting as a homage to the victims of the 2015 Colectiv nightclub fire. A gothic-inspired pop rock track, it contains an electric guitar solo throughout.

"Moment of Silence" received mixed reviews from music critics. In a Wiwibloggs review containing several reviews from individual critics, the song received praise for its cohesivity and anthemic nature, as well as for Anton's emotional vocal delivery, but was criticized for the lack of connection it creates with the listener. Overall, the reviewers on the website gave the song 5.55 out of 10 points. A Eurovision.de writer likened "Moment of Silence" to the works of Swedish band Europe. At the 2017 Radio România Actualități Awards, the track won Best Pop Rock Song, while receiving a nomination for Song of the Year.

== Eurovision attempt and promotion ==
The Romanian Television (TVR) opened a submission period for artists and composers to submit their entries between 8 and 10 February 2016 to the Selecția Națională, in order to select their entry for the Eurovision Song Contest 2016. A jury panel made up of music professionals rated all songs, revealing their 12 finalists on 11 February. During the contest's semi-final held on 4 March, Anton qualified for the final in first place, gaining 54 points from the jury. On the latter occasion two days later, he was chosen to represent Romania at Eurovision, with 6,585 televotes. During Anton's performance, he was accompanied by a sword dancer and several backing vocalists—including singer Teodora Dinu. Irving Wolther of Eurovision.de applauded the singer's vocals, but deemed his show as "lifeless".

Romania was originally planned to perform in the contest's second semi-final, but was eventually forced to withdraw. The European Broadcasting Union (EBU) announced on 22 April 2016 that TVR had repeatedly failed to pay debts totalling CHF 16 million (€14.56 million) by 20 April, the deadline set by the EBU. TVR's failure to repay their debts resulted in their withdrawal from the EBU, and consequently Romania's withdrawal from the contest. This led to strong reactions against the decision, including from Anton. He was eventually invited by Moldova's TeleRadio-Moldova (TRM) to accompany their entrant Lidia Isac on the Eurovision stage, with the intent of singing "Falling Stars" as a duet, but he declined the offer.

In order to promote Anton's intended Eurovision participation, he had performed "Moment of Silence" at Eurovision In Concert in Amsterdam, as well as at the London Eurovision event in London in April 2016. He also appeared on the third semi-final of the sixth season of Românii au talent in May. Other performances of "Moment of Silence" include at the Selecția Națională 2017, and at the 2018 Golden Stag Festival, during which he acted as the representative for Romania.

== Anton version ==
"Moment of Silence"

Single by Anton
- Released: 14 July 2016
- Genre: Pop rock
- Length: 3:02
- Label: Roton
- Songwriter(s): Ovidiu Anton
- Producer(s): Liviu Sorescu

Anton singles chronology
"Suntem brazi" (2017)	"Moment of Silence" (2016)	"Amintirea ta" (2018)

"Moment of Silence" was eventually released as a single by Ovidiu Anton as part of his band Anton, consisting of him on vocals, alongside Cristi Gram, Fernando Drăgănici, Dani Vlad and Liviu Sorescu on instruments. It was made available for digital download on 14 July 2016 by Roton. In comparison to the original recording, the single version was remastered, opting for a more rock sound, and has the guitar played by Gram in the foreground. An accompanying music video was uploaded onto Roton's YouTube channel on 13 July 2016, featuring Anton performing the track in a "deserted attic".

=== Track listing ===
- Digital download
1. "Moment of Silence" – 3:02

=== Release history ===
Territory	Date	Format(s)	Label
Romania	14 July 2016	Digital download	Roton
