= Romanyuta =

Romanyuta (Russian or Ukrainian: Романюта) is a gender-neutral Slavic surname. Notable people with the surname include:

- Eduard Romanyuta (born 1992), Ukrainian dance-pop vocalist, songwriter, and actor
- Evgenia Romanyuta (born 1988), Russian racing cyclist
