= Moldova in the Eurovision Song Contest 2015 =

- Eurovision Song Contest 2015
- Participating broadcaster: TeleRadio-Moldova (TRM)
- Country: Moldova
- Selection process: O melodie pentru Europa 2015
- Selection date: 28 February 2015

Competing entry
- Song: "I Want Your Love"
- Artist: Eduard Romanyuta
- Songwriters: Erik Lewander; Hayley Aitken; Tom Andrews

Placement
- Semi-final result: Failed to qualify (11th)

Participation chronology

Moldova was represented at the Eurovision Song Contest 2015 with the song "I Want Your Love" written by Erik Lewander, Hayley Aitken and Tom Andrews. The song was performed by Eduard Romanyuta. The Moldovan broadcaster TeleRadio-Moldova (TRM) organised the national final O melodie pentru Europa 2015 in order to select the Moldovan entry for the 2015 contest in Vienna, Austria. 68 entries competed to represent Moldova in Vienna, with 24 being shortlisted to participate in the televised national final after auditioning in front of a jury panel. After two semi-finals and a final which took place in February 2015, "I Want Your Love" performed by Eduard Romanyuta emerged as the winner after gaining the most points following the combination of votes from a jury panel and a public televote.

Moldova was drawn to compete in the first semi-final of the Eurovision Song Contest which took place on 19 May 2015. Performing as the opening entry for the show in position 1, "I Want Your Love" was not announced among the top 10 entries of the first semi-final and therefore did not qualify to compete in the final. It was later revealed that Moldova placed eleventh out of the 16 participating countries in the semi-final with 41 points.

== Background ==
Prior to the 2015 contest, Moldova had participated in the Eurovision Song Contest ten times since its first entry in 2005. The nation's best placing in the contest was sixth, which it achieved in 2005 with the song "Boonika bate doba" performed by Zdob și Zdub. Other than their debut entry, to this point, Moldova's only other top ten placing at the contest was achieved in 2007 where "Fight" performed by Natalia Barbu placed tenth. In the 2014 contest, "Wild Soul" performed by Cristina Scarlat failed to qualify Moldova to compete in the final.

The Moldovan national broadcaster, TeleRadio-Moldova (TRM), broadcast the event within Moldova and organised the selection process for the nation's entry. TRM confirmed their intentions to participate at the 2015 Eurovision Song Contest on 18 September 2014. Moldova has selected their entry via a national selection show since 2008, a procedure that was continued for their 2015 participation.

== Before Eurovision ==
=== O melodie pentru Europa 2015 ===
O melodie pentru Europa 2015 was the national final format developed by TRM in order to select Moldova's entry for the Eurovision Song Contest 2015. The event included two semi-finals and a final to be held on 24, 26 and 28 February 2015, respectively. All shows in the competition were broadcast on Moldova 1, Radio Moldova Actualități, Radio Moldova Tineret and Radio Moldova Muzical as well as online via the broadcaster's official website trm.md. The final was broadcast online at the official Eurovision Song Contest website eurovision.tv.

==== Format ====
The selection of the competing entries for the national final and ultimately the Moldovan Eurovision entry took place over three rounds. The first round occurred on 17 December 2014 where a jury panel shortlisted fifty entries from the received submissions based on criteria such as the quality of the melody and composition, vocals and manner of the performance and the originality of the song. The second round was a live audition of the 50 entries in front of a jury panel that took place on 17 January 2015. Entries were assessed on criteria such as voice quality, stage presence and strength of the composition. The panel selected 24 semi-finalists to proceed to the third round, the televised national final. 12 semi-finalists competed in each semi-final on 24 and 26 February 2015. Eight songs qualified to the final from each semi-final; seven of the qualifiers qualified based on the combined votes from an expert jury and public televoting results, while the eighth qualifier in each semi-final was the entry that achieved the highest televote score from the remaining entries after a second round of public televoting took place during an after-show. The sixteen qualifying entries competed in the final on 28 February 2015 where the winner was selected by the 50/50 combination of an expert jury vote and a public televote. In the event of a tie, the entry that receives the highest score from the expert jury vote was declared the winner.

==== Competing entries ====
Artists and composers had the opportunity to submit their entries between 15 October 2014 and 15 December 2014. Both artists and songwriters could hold any nationality. Artists could submit more than one song, however, if they were chosen as a semi-finalist with more than one song, the artist would have to choose one entry to continue with in the competition. At the conclusion of the submission deadline, 68 valid entries were received by the broadcaster, 19 of them which came from foreign artists from ten countries: seven from the United Kingdom, two each from Russia and Spain, one each from Belarus, Canada, Cyprus, Ireland, Norway, Romania and Ukraine. A jury consisting of Zinaida Brînzilă-Coșleț (lecturer at the Academy of Music, Theatre and Fine Arts), Adrian Beldiman (composer, Radio Moldova chief music editor), Iurie Badicu (producer), Aurel Chirtoacă (singer) and Vlad Costandoi (producer) selected 50 out of the 68 received entries to proceed to the audition round.

The live audition round took place on 19 December 2014 at TRM Studio 2 in Chișinău where 24 semi-finalists were selected to advance. The auditions were broadcast via radio on Radio Moldova Muzical as well as online via trm.md. The jury panel that evaluated the songs during the live auditions and selected the 24 semi-finalists consisted of Adrian Beldiman (composer, Radio Moldova chief producer), Iurie Badicu (producer), Aurel Chirtoacă (singer), Aliona Triboi (singer), Andrei Sava (composer), Victor Buruiană (songwriter) and Vlad Costandoi (producer). The 24 semi-finalists were allocated to one of the two semi-finals, each containing 12 entries, in a draw that was held on 29 January 2015 at TRM Headquarters in Chișinău. On 7 February 2015, "Our Star" performed by Edict was withdrawn from the competition and replaced with the song "Vocea inimii" performed by Anișoara Volînschi.

Artist	Song	Songwriter(s)
Anișoara Volînschi	"Vocea inimii"	Marcel Roșca
Carolina Gorun	"Sublime"	Ylva Persson, Linda Persson, Natasha Turner, Mats Tärnfors
Cezara	"Am devenit străini"	Andrei Iorga, Ene Gelu Sergiu, Sandel Balan, Alin Radu
Dana Markitan	"Love Me"	Patrik Öhlund, Madelene Hamberg
Diana Brescan	"Up and Down"	Eugen Doibani
Doinița Gherman	"Inimă fierbinte"	Doinița Gherman, Ricu Vodă, Cătălin Gondiu
Domenico Protino	"Let Me Fly"	Domenico Protino, Nardi Sandro
DoReDoS	"Maricica"	Pasha Parfeny, Mihai Teodor
Edict	"Our Star"	Valeriu Catarga, Anatol Neagu
Eduard Romanyuta	"I Want Your Love"	Erik Lewander, Hayley Aitken, Tom Andrews
Glam Girls	"Magia"	Alexandru Gorgos, Alina Dabija
Irina Kitoroagă	"I'm Gonna Get You"	Gicu Cimbir, Keith Almgren, Madelene Hamberg, Patrik Öhlund, Erik Anjou
Julia Sandu	"Fire"	Calle Kindbom, David Wilhelmson, Philip E. Morris Åkerblad
Kitty Brucknell	"Remix"	Charlie Mason, Kitty Brucknell, The Elements
Lidia Isac	"I Can't Breathe"	Anton Ragoza, Serghei Stepanov, Mihai Teodor
Marcel Roșca	"Feelings Will Never Leave"	Marcel Roșca
Mihaela Andrei	"About Love"	Vitalie Catană, Gloria Gorceag
Miss M	"Lonely Stranger"	Anastasia Ursu
Raby	"Hero"	Ilie Gorincioi, Elena Buga
Serj Kuzenkoff	"Danu năzdrăvanu"	Veaceslav Daniliuc, Sergiu Cuzencov, Diana Enachii
Stela Boțan	"Save Me"	Stela Boțan, Constantin Dușcu
SunStroke Project and Michael Ra	"Day After Day"	Elena Buga, Michael Ra
Valeria Pașa	"I Can Change All My Life"	Valeriu Pașa
Vera and Diana Popa	"Faith"	Vera Țurcanu
Vitalie Todirașcu	"Tu singura"	Valy Boghean, Anton Bacalbașa

==== Semi-finals ====
The two semi-finals took place on 24 and 25 February 2015 at TRM Studio 2 in Chișinău, hosted by Sergiu Beznițchi who was joined by Evelina Vîrlan in the first semi-final and Gloria Gorceag in the second semi-final. Daniela Babici and Sandu Scobioală reported from the green room during both shows. In each semi-final twelve acts competed and seven songs qualified to the final based on the combination of votes from a public televote and the votes of an expert jury, while an eighth qualifier was selected by an additional televote between the remaining non-qualifiers and was revealed during a post semi-final discussion show. The jury that voted in the semi-finals included Vlad Costandoi (producer), Andrei Sava (composer), Serge Kino (DJ and promoter), Zinuţa Julea (lecturer at the Academy of Music, Theatre and Fine Arts), Dumitru Miller (conductor of State Philharmonic Orchestra from Ashdod, Israel), Iurie Badicu (producer and lyricist), Victoria Tcacenco (Associate Professor, Academy of Music, Theatre and Fine Arts. Doctor in arts), Adrian Beldiman (composer, Radio Moldova chief music editor) and Victor Buruiană (songwriter).

In addition to the performances of the competing entries, 2006 Moldovan Eurovision entrant Natalia Gordienko, 2008 Moldovan Eurovision entrant Geta Burlacu, 2010 Moldovan Eurovision entrant Olia Tira, 2012 Moldovan Eurovision entrant Pasha Parfeny, 2013 Moldovan Eurovision entrant Aliona Moon, 2014 Moldovan Eurovision entrant Cristina Scarlat, and singers Boris Covali, Cristina Croitoru, Aurel Chirtoacă, Natan performed as guests in the first semi-final, while Aliona Moon and the Tharmis Orchestra performed as guests in the second semi-final.

First round (jury and televote) qualifier
Second round (televote-only) qualifier

Semi-final 1 – 24 February 2015
R/O	Artist	Song	Jury		Televote		Total	Place
R/O	Artist	Song	Votes	Points	Votes	Points	Total	Place
1	Eduard Romanyuta	"I Want Your Love"	63	7	2,955	12	19	1
2	Marcel Roșca	"Feelings Will Never Leave"	55	5	172	3	8	7
3	Kitty Brucknell	"Remix"	17	1	88	0	1	11
4	Mihaela Andrei	"About Love"	22	2	183	4	6	8
5	Raby	"Hero"	13	0	306	6	6	9
6	Glam Girls	"Magia"	35	3	400	10	13	5
7	Diana Brescan	"Up and Down"	74	12	200	5	17	2
8	Serj Kuzenkoff	"Danu năzdrăvanu"	63	6	371	8	14	4
9	Domenico Protino	"Let Me Fly"	36	4	66	0	4	10
10	SunStroke Project and Michael Ra	"Day After Day"	71	10	369	7	17	3
11	Irina Kitoroagă	"I'm Gonna Get You"	63	8	155	2	10	6
12	Anișoara Volînschi	"Vocea inimii"	10	0	146	1	1	12

Detailed Jury Votes
R/O	Song	D. Miller	S. Kino	V. Costandoi	Z. Julea	A. Sava	I. Badicu	V. Tcacenco	A. Beldiman	V. Buruiană	Total
1	"I Want Your Love"	4		8	12	7	10	5	10	7	63
2	"Feelings Will Never Leave"	8	5	10	7	8	3	3	3	8	55
3	"Remix"	3	3	1	1	4		2	1	2	17
4	"About Love"	1	2	6	2	5	1		5		22
5	"Hero"	5	7							1	13
6	"Magia"	2		3	3	2	8	7	6	4	35
7	"Up and Down"	7	10	12	5	10	5	6	7	12	74
8	"Danu năzdrăvanu"	10	8	4	6	3	7	8	12	5	63
9	"Let Me Fly"		6	5	4	6	4	4	4	3	36
10	"Day After Day"		12	7	10	12	6	12	2	10	71
11	"I'm Gonna Get You"	12	4	2	8	1	12	10	8	6	63
12	"Vocea inimii"	6	1				2	1			10

Semi-final 2 – 26 February 2015
R/O	Artist	Song	Jury		Televote		Total	Place
R/O	Artist	Song	Votes	Points	Votes	Points	Total	Place
1	Vera and Diana Popa	"Faith"	40	3	228	1	4	11
2	Valeria Pașa	"I Can Change All My Life"	72	10	274	2	12	5
3	Carolina Gorun	"Sublime"	21	2	318	3	5	9
4	Stela Boțan	"Save Me"	50	5	1,135	12	17	2
5	Cezara	"Am devenit străini"	43	4	188	0	4	10
6	Doinița Gherman	"Inimă fierbinte"	65	8	759	7	15	4
7	Dana Markitan	"Love Me"	61	6	533	5	11	6
8	DoReDoS	"Maricica"	64	7	807	10	17	1
9	Vitalie Todirașcu	"Tu singura"	10	0	189	0	0	12
10	Julia Sandu	"Fire"	5	0	594	6	6	8
11	Lidia Isac	"I Can't Breathe"	18	1	803	8	9	7
12	Miss M	"Lonely Stranger"	73	12	402	4	16	3

Detailed Jury Votes
R/O	Song	D. Miller	S. Kino	V. Costandoi	Z. Julea	A. Sava	I. Badicu	V. Tcacenco	A. Beldiman	V. Buruiană	Total
1	"Faith"		5	2	6	7	2	7	8	3	40
2	"I Can Change All My Life"	3	6	7	7	12	7	8	12	10	72
3	"Sublime"	4		3	2	1	1	4		6	21
4	"Save Me"	7	8	12	4	5	6	1	6	1	50
5	"Am devenit străini"	5	3	6	10	2	5		10	2	43
6	"Inimă fierbinte"	12	1	8	8	8	10	6	4	8	65
7	"Love Me"	6	7	10	5	4	8	2	7	12	61
8	"Maricica"	10	12	5	3	6	4	12	5	7	64
9	"Tu singura"		4		1			5			10
10	"Fire"	2							3		5
11	"I Can't Breathe"	1	2	1		3	3	3	1	4	18
12	"Lonely Stranger"	8	10	4	12	10	12	10	2	5	73

==== Final ====
The final took place on 28 February 2015 at TRM Studio 2 in Chișinău, hosted by Sergiu Beznițchi and Olivia Furtună with Daniela Babici and Sandu Scobioală reporting from the green room. The sixteen songs that qualified from the preceding two semi-finals competed and the winner was selected based on the combination of a public televote and the votes of an expert jury. The jury that voted in the final included Vlad Costandoi (producer), Andrei Sava (composer), Serge Kino (DJ and promoter), Zinuţa Julea (lecturer at the Academy of Music, Theatre and Fine Arts), Dumitru Miller (conductor of State Philharmonic Orchestra from Ashdod, Israel), Iurie Badicu (producer and lyricist), Victoria Tcacenco (Associate Professor, Academy of Music, Theatre and Fine Arts. Doctor in arts), Adrian Beldiman (composer, Radio Moldova chief music editor), Victor Buruiană (songwriter), Ștefan Petrache (singer) and Ghenadie Ciobanu (composer). In addition to the performances of the competing entries, 2007 Moldovan Eurovision entrant Natalia Barbu, 2014 Moldovan Eurovision entrant Cristina Scarlat, singers Igor Stribiţchi, Igor Sîrbu, Akord, Tania Cergă, DARA, and the dance troupe Black and White performed as guests. "I Want Your Love" performed by Eduard Romanyuta was selected as the winner.

Final – 28 February 2015
R/O	Artist	Song	Jury		Televote		Total	Place
R/O	Artist	Song	Votes	Points	Votes	Points	Total	Place
1	Miss M	"Lonely Stranger"	67	8	561	3	11	5
2	Irina Kitoroagă	"I'm Gonna Get You"	38	2	169	0	2	13
3	Eduard Romanyuta	"I Want Your Love"	84	10	13,500	12	22	1
4	Dana Markitan	"Love Me"	44	4	473	2	6	10
5	Diana Brescan	"Up and Down"	61	7	394	0	7	9
6	Doinița Gherman	"Inimă fierbinte"	26	0	1,198	5	5	11
7	DoReDoS	"Maricica"	27	0	9,808	10	10	6
8	Stela Boțan	"Save Me"	31	1	1,999	7	8	8
9	Mihaela Andrei	"About Love"	0	0	209	0	0	14
10	Lidia Isac	"I Can't Breathe"	4	0	242	0	0	14
11	Glam Girls	"Magia"	9	0	72	0	0	14
12	SunStroke Project and Michael Ra	"Day After Day"	61	6	4,875	8	14	3
13	Julia Sandu	"Fire"	7	0	273	0	0	14
14	Serj Kuzenkoff	"Danu năzdrăvanu"	46	5	1,406	6	11	4
15	Marcel Roșca	"Feelings Will Never Leave"	43	3	470	1	4	12
16	Valeria Pașa	"I Can Change All My Life"	90	12	1,085	4	16	2

Detailed Jury Votes
R/O	Song	D. Miller	S. Kino	V. Costandoi	Z. Julea	A. Sava	I. Badicu	V. Tcacenco	A. Beldiman	V. Buruiană	S. Petrache	G. Ciobanu	Total
1	"Lonely Stranger"	5	12	6	10	6	7	10	6	2		3	67
2	"I'm Gonna Get You"	7			4	3	6	5		5	6	2	38
3	"I Want Your Love"	10	2	8	12	12	12	8	12	3		5	84
4	"Love Me"	2	10	3	1	5	4		2	8	1	8	44
5	"Up and Down"		7	12	2	10	2	4	4	10		10	61
6	"Inimă fierbinte"	8			6	4		2	1		5		26
7	"Maricica"	4	6	5			1	7			3	1	27
8	"Save Me"		5	7		2	10		7				31
9	"About Love"												0
10	"I Can't Breathe"										4		4
11	"Magia"	1						1	5		2		9
12	"Day After Day"	3	8	4	8	8	3	12	1	7		7	61
13	"Fire"										7		7
14	"Danu năzdrăvanu"		3	1	7	1	5	3	10	4	8	4	46
15	"Feelings Will Never Leave"	12	1	2	3				3	6	10	6	43
16	"I Can Change All My Life"	6	4	10	5	7	8	6	8	12	12	12	90

==== Controversy ====
Following the conclusion of the national final, several of the national final participants expressed their discontent with the results and questioned the fairness of the competition. Doiniţa Gherman, Serj Kuzenkoff and Valeria Paşa spoke to Moldovan media after the competition claiming that the number of televotes Eduard Romanyuta gained in the final was suspicious, while also expressing their disappointment that Romanyuta, an artist from Ukraine, would be representing Moldova on an international stage. Diana Brescan and Miss M commented through social media about the discrepancy between the jury voting in the semi-finals, where Romanyuta placed fourth, and the final. 2010 Moldovan Eurovision entrants SunStroke Project and 2012 Moldovan Eurovision entrant Pasha Parfeny accused Romanyuta of being corrupt.

=== Promotion ===
Eduard Romanyuta made several appearances across Europe to specifically promote "I Want Your Love" as the Moldovan Eurovision entry. On 7 April, Eduard Romanyuta took part in promotional activities in Georgia which included television and radio appearances. On 17 April, Romanyuta performed during the Eurovision PreParty Riga, which was organised by OGAE Latvia and held at the Palladium Concert Hall in Riga. On 15 April, Romanyuta performed during a preview event which was organised by OGAE Serbia and held at the UŠĆE Shopping Centre in Belgrade, Serbia. On 18 April, Romanyuta performed during the Eurovision in Concert event which was held at the Melkweg venue in Amsterdam, Netherlands and hosted by Cornald Maas and Edsilia Rombley. On 26 April, Eduard Romanyuta performed during the London Eurovision Party, which was held at the Café de Paris venue in London, United Kingdom and hosted by Nicki French and Paddy O'Connell.

== At Eurovision ==
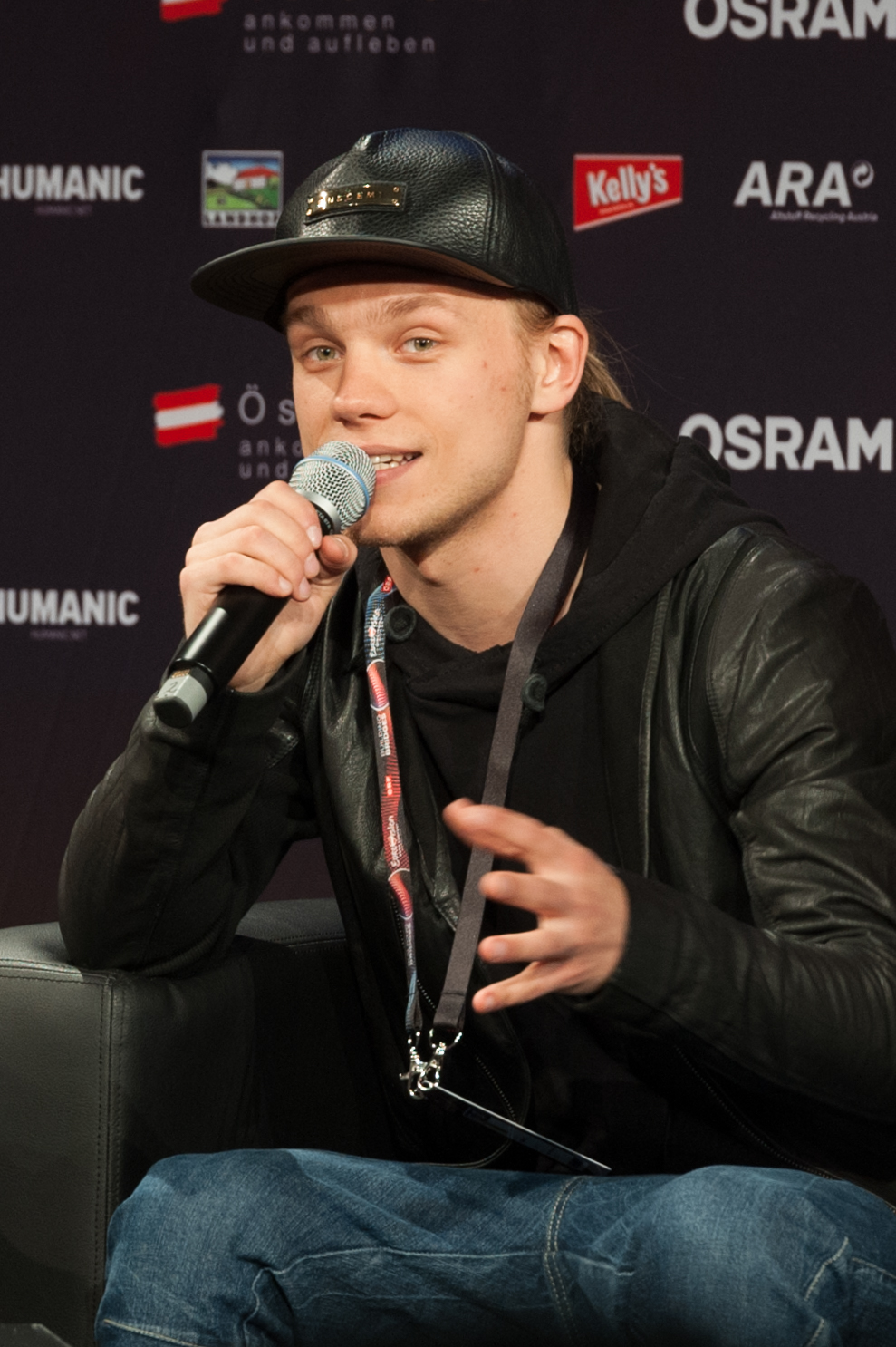
Eduard Romanyuta during a press meet and greet

According to Eurovision rules, all nations with the exceptions of the host country and the "Big Five" (France, Germany, Italy, Spain and the United Kingdom) are required to qualify from one of two semi-finals in order to compete for the final; the top ten countries from each semi-final progress to the final. In the 2015 contest, Australia also competed directly in the final as an invited guest nation. The European Broadcasting Union (EBU) split up the competing countries into five different pots based on voting patterns from previous contests, with countries with favourable voting histories put into the same pot. On 26 January 2015, a special allocation draw was held which placed each country into one of the two semi-finals, as well as which half of the show they would perform in. Moldova was placed into the first semi-final, to be held on 19 May 2015, and was scheduled to perform in the first half of the show.

Once all the competing songs for the 2015 contest had been released, the running order for the semi-finals was decided by the shows' producers rather than through another draw, so that similar songs were not placed next to each other. Moldova was set to open the show and perform in position 1, before the entry from Armenia.

The two semi-finals and the final were televised in Moldova on Moldova 1 as well as broadcast via radio on Radio Moldova, Radio Moldova Muzical and Radio Moldova Tineret. All broadcasts featured commentary by Daniela Babici. The Moldovan spokesperson, who announced the Moldovan votes during the final, was Olivia Furtună.

=== Semi-final ===
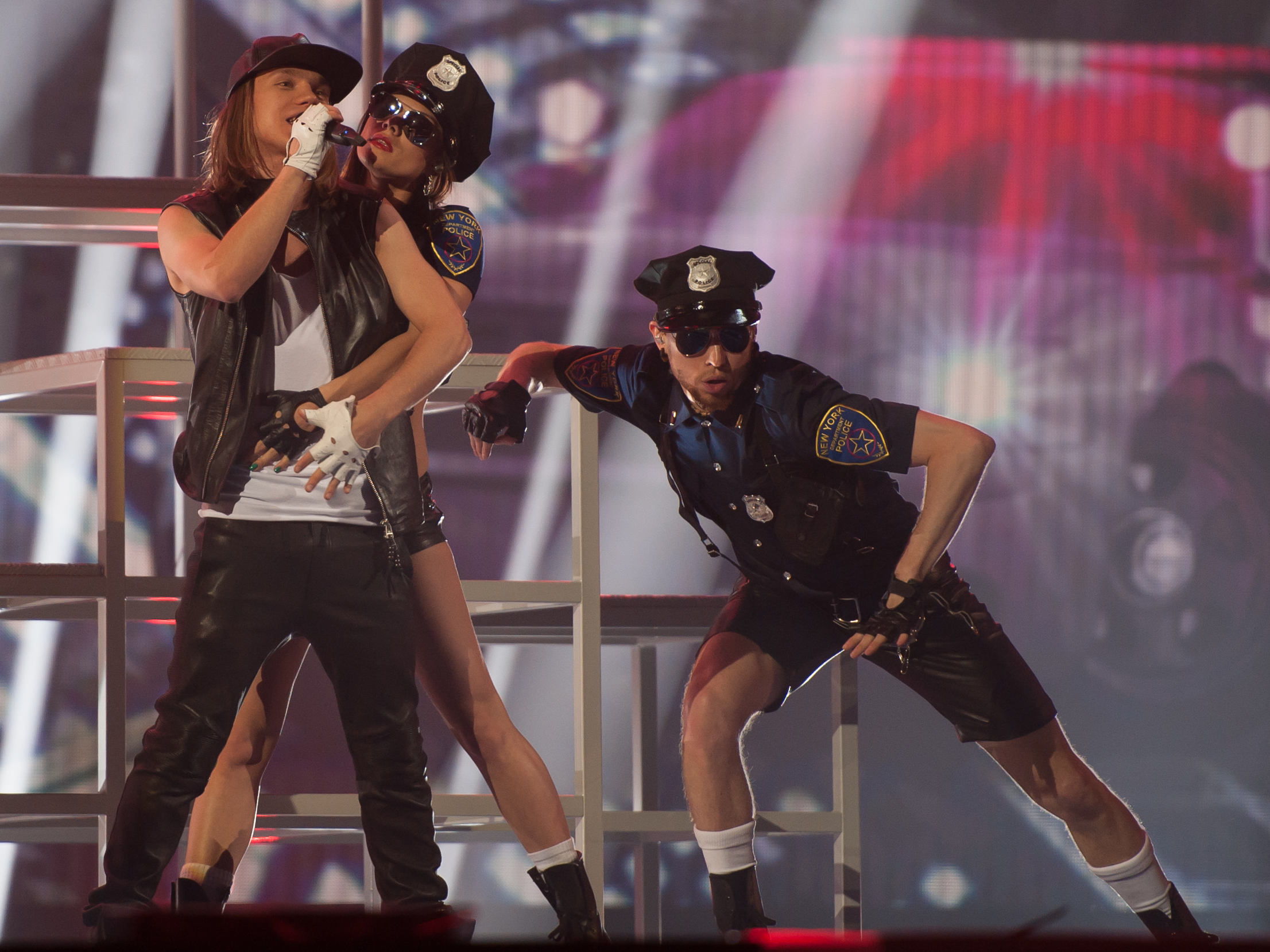
Eduard Romanyuta during a rehearsal before the first semi-final

Eduard Romanyuta took part in technical rehearsals on 11 and 15 May, followed by dress rehearsals on 18 and 19 May. This included the jury show on 18 May where the professional juries of each country watched and voted on the competing entries.

The Moldovan performance featured Eduard Romanyuta performing with three dancers and two backing vocalists dressed as police crew. A metallic scaffold stage prop was the main feature of the performance with Romanyuta and the dancers performing a choreographed routine atop the different platforms. The stage featured predominantly red lighting and LED screen projections of white-grey skyscrapers, policemen and police cars. The three dancers that joined Romanyuta on stage are Aleksandr Ushakov, Evgeni Kot and Nataliya Slisarenko, while the two backing vocalists are Maryana Nestayko and Natalia Redchuk.

At the end of the show, Moldova was not announced among the top 10 entries in the first semi-final and therefore failed to qualify to compete in the final. It was later revealed that Moldova had placed eleventh in the semi-final, receiving a total of 41 points.

=== Voting ===
Voting during the three shows consisted of 50 percent public televoting and 50 percent from a jury deliberation. The jury consisted of five music industry professionals who were citizens of the country they represent, with their names published before the contest to ensure transparency. This jury was asked to judge each contestant based on: vocal capacity; the stage performance; the song's composition and originality; and the overall impression by the act. In addition, no member of a national jury could be related in any way to any of the competing acts in such a way that they cannot vote impartially and independently. The individual rankings of each jury member were released shortly after the grand final.

Following the release of the full split voting by the EBU after the conclusion of the competition, it was revealed that Moldova had placed eleventh with the public televote and thirteenth with the jury vote in the first semi-final. In the public vote, Moldova scored 48 points, while with the jury vote, Moldova scored 46 points.

Below is a breakdown of points awarded to Moldova and awarded by Moldova in the first semi-final and grand final of the contest, and the breakdown of the jury voting and televoting conducted during the two shows:

==== Points awarded to Moldova ====
Points awarded to Moldova (Semi-final 1)
Score	Country
12 points	
10 points	Georgia
8 points	Romania
7 points	
6 points	Armenia
5 points	Belarus; Macedonia; Serbia
4 points	
3 points	
2 points	Albania
1 point	

==== Points awarded by Moldova ====
Points awarded by Moldova (Semi-final 1)
Score	Country
12 points	Romania
10 points	Georgia
8 points	Belarus
7 points	Russia
6 points	Albania
5 points	Belgium
4 points	Armenia
3 points	Greece
2 points	Estonia
1 point	Macedonia

Points awarded by Moldova (Final)
Score	Country
12 points	Romania
10 points	Russia
8 points	Sweden
7 points	Italy
6 points	Belgium
5 points	Georgia
4 points	Australia
3 points	Azerbaijan
2 points	Latvia
1 point	Spain

==== Detailed voting results ====
The following members comprised the Moldovan jury:

- Sergiu Scarlat (jury chairperson) – producer
- Vlad Mircos – composer
- Geta Burlacu – singer, represented Moldova in the 2008 contest (jury member in semi-final 1)
- Vitalie Catana – composer, music producer (jury member in the final)
- Alina Dabija – lyrics writer
- Margarita Ciorici – singer

Detailed voting results from Moldova (Semi-final 1)
R/O	Country	S. Scarlat	V. Mircos	G. Burlacu	A. Dabija	M. Ciorici	Jury Rank	Televote Rank	Combined Rank	Points
01	Moldova									
02	Armenia	7	4	7	12	4	6	10	7	4
03	Belgium	8	14	2	6	10	8	4	6	5
04	Netherlands	12	11	8	15	12	12	11	13	
05	Finland	13	15	15	9	15	15	13	15	
06	Greece	10	9	12	10	8	11	7	8	3
07	Estonia	9	13	13	13	14	14	5	9	2
08	Macedonia	3	7	6	11	7	5	15	10	1
09	Serbia	6	3	11	14	9	9	12	11	
10	Hungary	14	10	9	4	11	10	14	14	
11	Belarus	2	2	4	7	3	2	6	3	8
12	Russia	11	8	10	8	2	7	2	4	7
13	Denmark	15	12	14	5	13	13	9	12	
14	Albania	4	6	3	3	5	3	8	5	6
15	Romania	1	1	1	1	1	1	1	1	12
16	Georgia	5	5	5	2	6	4	3	2	10

Detailed voting results from Moldova (Final)
R/O	Country	S. Scarlat	V. Mircos	V. Catana	A. Dabija	M. Ciorici	Jury Rank	Televote Rank	Combined Rank	Points
01	Slovenia	20	19	16	13	20	19	14	18	
02	France	21	11	24	12	11	15	19	19	
03	Israel	10	15	25	17	12	16	12	13	
04	Estonia	19	25	27	23	24	26	7	17	
05	United Kingdom	27	24	22	20	27	27	26	27	
06	Armenia	18	16	26	16	16	21	9	15	
07	Lithuania	7	20	7	26	25	18	23	22	
08	Serbia	8	3	10	21	9	8	24	16	
09	Norway	14	21	8	9	7	11	16	12	
10	Sweden	4	2	4	3	2	2	5	3	8
11	Cyprus	22	22	18	14	17	22	21	23	
12	Australia	11	9	2	2	5	3	13	7	4
13	Belgium	3	18	5	4	6	5	6	5	6
14	Austria	26	26	23	24	19	25	27	26	
15	Greece	17	8	21	6	10	12	17	14	
16	Montenegro	5	10	14	7	22	10	15	11	
17	Germany	25	13	12	11	21	17	18	20	
18	Poland	23	17	19	25	23	23	25	25	
19	Latvia	2	7	9	19	18	9	8	9	2
20	Romania	1	1	1	1	1	1	1	1	12
21	Spain	9	12	13	22	13	14	11	10	1
22	Hungary	24	23	17	27	26	24	22	24	
23	Georgia	6	6	6	15	8	6	10	6	5
24	Azerbaijan	13	14	15	10	15	13	4	8	3
25	Russia	15	4	3	5	4	4	2	2	10
26	Albania	12	27	20	18	14	20	20	21	
27	Italy	16	5	11	8	3	7	3	4	7
