= Lisandro Cuxi =

Portuguese-French singer (born 1999)

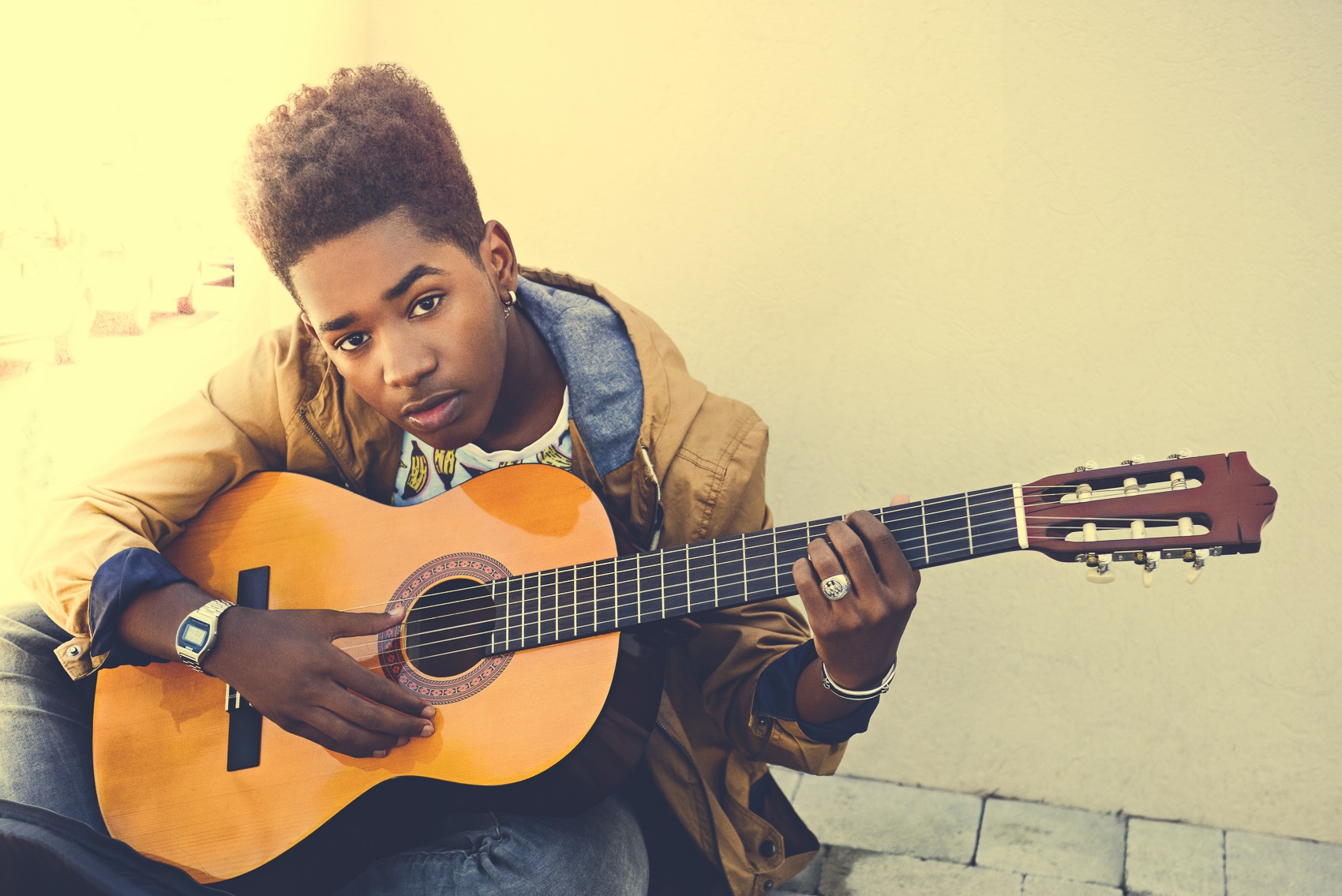
- Cuxi in 2015

Background information
- Born: Lisandro Monteiro Furtado; 17 July 1999 (age 27); Torres Vedras, Lisbon Region, Portugal
- Origin: Cannes, France
- Genres: Pop; soul; R&B; funk; dancehall; world
- Occupations: Singer-songwriter; dancer
- Years active: 2017–present
- Label: Mercury

Lisandro Monteiro Furtado (born 17 July 1999), better known by his stage name Lisandro Cuxi, is a Cape Verdean singer-songwriter and dancer. In 2017, Cuxi won the sixth season of The Voice: la plus belle voix as part of Team M. Pokora. He released his debut album named Ma bonne étoile in September 2017.

== Early life ==
His family was originally from Cape Verde. Cuxi was born on 17 July 1999 in Lisbon, Portugal, and is the youngest brother of singer Soraia Ramos. At aged nine he moved to Cannes despite not being able to speak French. He then learned both French and English especially with songs.

== Career ==
=== 2015: The Voice Kids ===
In 2015, he took part in season 2 of the French television series The Voice Kids, broadcast from 25 September to 23 October 2015. In the blind auditions, Cuxi sang "Run to You" by Whitney Houston, all three coaches turning their chairs. Cuxi chose to be part of Team Jenifer. He went on to reach Final and finished in second.

=== 2017: The Voice: la plus belle voix & Ma bonne étoile ===
In 2017, he took part in season 6 of the French television series The Voice: la plus belle voix, broadcast on TF1 from 18 February to 10 June 2017. In the blind auditions, Cuxi sang "Can't Stop the Feeling" by Justin Timberlake with all four coaches, Florent Pagny, Mika, Zazie and M. Pokora turning their chairs. Cuxi chose to be part of Team Matt. Cuxi went on to win the show.

==== Performances ====
Performed	Song	Original artist	Result
Blind audition	"Can't Stop the Feeling"	Justin Timberlake	Joined Team Matt
Battles	"Runnin'"	Naughty Boy feat. Beyoncé & Arrow Benjamin	Won Battle
Épreuves Ultimes 2	"Elle m'a aimé"	Kendji Girac	Winner
Lives 1	"24K Magic"	Bruno Mars	Saved by public
Lives 2	"Love on the Brain"	Rihanna	Saved by public
Semi-finals	"Si seulement je pouvais lui manquer"	Calogero	Advanced
Final	"L'envie d'aimer"	Daniel Lévi	Winner

After winning The Voice: la plus belle voix on 10 June 2017, he released his debut single "Danser" on 17 June. The song peaked at number 18 on the French Singles Chart. His debut studio album, Ma bonne étoile was released on 15 September 2017 by Mercury Records and includes the single "Danser", co-written by Dany Synthé and Émilie Satt. The album peaked at number 16 on the French Albums Chart.

=== 2018–present: Eurovision Song Contest ===
On 7 January 2018, he was confirmed as one artists competing in Destination Eurovision the national final organised by France 2 to select France's entry for Eurovision Song Contest 2018. He performed during the first semi-final which was filmed on 8 January 2018 and aired on 13 January 2018. He performed a cover of "Billie Jean" by Michael Jackson and his Eurovision song "Eva". He progressed to the Final by winning the semi-final. Results in the semi-final were determined by a Francophone jury panel and an international jury panel. The final aired live on 27 January 2018. Despite winning the international jury vote, he placed third in the public vote and finished in second place behind winners Madame Monsieur.

== Discography ==
=== Albums ===
Title	Details	Peak chart positions
Title	Details	FRA
Ma bonne étoile	Released: 15 September 2017; Label: Mercury Records; Format: Digital download, CD	16

=== Singles ===
Title	Year	Peak chart positions	Album
Title	Year	FRA	Album
"Danser"	2017	18	Ma bonne étoile
"Eva"	2018	17	Non-album single
"—" denotes a single that did not chart or was not released.

== Awards and nominations ==
Year	Award	Category	Result
2017	NRJ Music Awards	Francophone Breakthrough of the Year	Won

Awards and achievements
Preceded by Slimane Nebchi	The Voice: la plus belle voix Winner; 2017	Succeeded by Maëlle Pistoia
