= The Voice: la plus belle voix season 6 =

The Voice: la plus belle voix
- Season 6
- Hosted by: Nikos Aliagas; Karine Ferri
- Judges: Florent Pagny, Mika, Zazie, Matt Pokora
- Winner: Lisandro Cuxi
- Runner-up: Lucie Vagenheim

Release
- Original network: TF1
- Original release: 18 February – 10 June 2017

Season chronology
- ← Previous; Season 5

The Voice: la plus belle voix (season 6) is the sixth season of the French reality singing competition, created by media tycoon John de Mol. It was aired from 18 February to 10 June 2017 on TF1.

One of the important premises of the show is the quality of the singing talent. Four coaches, themselves popular performing artists, train the talents in their group and occasionally perform with them. Talents are selected in blind auditions, where the coaches cannot see, but only hear the auditioner.

Three of the coaches continued from season five, namely Florent Pagny, Zazie and Mika. But Matt Pokora replaced Garou. With Garou's departure, Pagny serves as the last remaining coach from the show's inaugural season.

Lisandro Cuxi was announced as the winner of the season on 10 June 2017, marking Matt Pokora's first and only win as a coach. In addition, Cuxi became the first winning artist born outside of France.

== Overview ==
Color key

First place
Second place
Third place
Fourth place
Eliminated in Semi-finals
Eliminated in Quarter finals
Eliminated in Live Show 1
Stolen in Épreuves Ultimes (Knockout rounds)
Eliminated in Épreuves Ultimes (Knockout rounds)
Stolen in the Battle rounds
Eliminated in the Battle rounds

Coaches	Artists			
Florent Pagny				
Florent Pagny	Lucie Vagenheim	Shaby	Hélène Siau	Julia Paul
Florent Pagny	Nathalia	Marianne Aya Omac	Kap's	Gianni Bee
Florent Pagny	R'nold	Chloé	~~Valentin Stuff~~	~~Camille Esteban~~
Florent Pagny	Romain Regnier	Syrine	Lidia Isac	Bulle
Florent Pagny	Candice Parise	Damien Trautmann		
Mika				
Mika	Vincent Vinel	Audrey Joumas	Imane Mchangama	The SugaZz
Mika	~~Marvin Dupré~~	Juliette	Agathe Denoirjean	Lou Mai
Mika	Incantèsimu	Manoah	~~Claire Gautier~~	Sofia Landgren
Mika	Élise Mélinand	Samuel M.	Léman	Valentin F
Mika	JJ	Guylaine	Morgan Auger	
Zazie				
Zazie	Nicola Cavallaro	Matthieu Baronne	Marvin Dupré	Emmy Liana
Zazie	~~Marius~~	~~Audrey Joumas~~	~~Hélène Siau~~	Will Barber
Zazie	Alexandre Sookia	Valentin Stuff	~~Julia Paul~~	~~Manoah~~
Zazie	~~Dilomé~~	~~Léman~~	Fabian	Colour of Rice
Zazie	Elsa Roses	Claire Gautier	DeLaurentis	Jules Couturier
Matt Pokora				
Matt Pokora	Lisandro Cuxi	Ann-Shirley Ngoussa	Marius	Dilomé
Matt Pokora	Andréa Durand	Vincent Vella	Karla	Sacha Puzos
Matt Pokora	Nyco Lilliu	Ry'm	Kuku	Fonetyk et Dama
Matt Pokora	Aurelle	Vincent Richardson	Lisa Mistretta	Lily Berry
Matt Pokora	Camille Esteban	Ophée	Enzo	Angelo Powers

== Blind auditions ==
Color key

	Artist elected to join this coach's team
	Artist defaulted to join this coach's team
✔	Coach press "JE VOUS VEUX" button
	Artist got a "All turn"

=== Blind auditions 1 ===
Order	Contestant	Song	Coaches' and contestants' choices			
Order	Contestant	Song	Florent	Mika	Zazie	Matt
1	Marius	All I Want – Kodaline	✔	✔	✔	✔
2	Loup	Uptown Funk – Bruno Mars	—	—	—	—
3	Hélène Siau	La nuit je mens – Alain Bashung	✔	—	✔	—
4	Lisandro Cuxi	Can't stop the feeling – Justin Timberlake	✔	✔	✔	✔
5	Fanny Beaumont	Dernière danse – Indila	—	—	—	—
6	Vincent Vinel	Lose Yourself – Eminem	✔	✔	—	✔
7	Agathe Denoirjean	Je dis M – M	✔	✔	✔	✔
8	Marcos Adam	I Can't Stand the Rain – Tina Turner	—	—	—	—
9	Will Barber	Another Brick in the Wall – Pink Floyd	✔	✔	✔	✔
10	Syrine	Comme toi – Jean-Jacques Goldman	✔	—	—	—
11	Patrizia Grillo	Qui me dira – Nicole Croisille	—	—	—	—
12	Fonetyk et Dama	Cosmo – Soprano	—	—	—	✔
13	Candice Parise	Take Me to Church – Hozier	✔	✔	—	✔

=== Blind Auditions 2 ===
Order	Contestant	Song	Coaches' and contestants' choices			
Order	Contestant	Song	Florent	Mika	Zazie	Matt
1	Kap's (Capucine)	It's only mystery – Arthur Simms	✔	✔	—	✔
2	Liana	Catch & release – Matt Simons	—	—	—	—
3	Julia Paul	Jacques a dit – Christophe Willem	—	—	✔	✔
4	Samuel M	Clown – Soprano	✔	✔	—	✔
5	Karla	Without You – Mariah Carey	✔	✔	✔	✔
6	Camille Esteban	Dans le noir – Diam's	✔	—	—	—
7	Natan	What'd I Say – Ray Charles	—	—	—	—
8	Emmy Liyana	The Power of Love – Frankie Goes to Hollywood	✔	✔	✔	✔
9	Jay Spring	Parce que c'est toi – Axelle Red	—	—	—	—
10	Alexandre Balland	7 Years – Lukas Graham	—	—	—	—
11	Ry'm (Ludovic Schmitt)	Hit the Road Jack – Ray Charles	✔	✔	✔	✔
12	Elise Mélinand	You're the One That I Want – Olivia Newton-John & John Travolta	—	✔	—	—
13	Yoann Guay	J'entends siffler le train – Richard Anthony	—	—	—	—
14	Lily Berry (Lesly Grava)	Hymn for the Weekend – Coldplay	—	—	✔	✔

=== Blind auditions 3 ===
Order	Contestant	Song	Coaches' and contestants' choices			
Order	Contestant	Song	Florent	Mika	Zazie	Matt
1	Nathalia	Y.M.C.A. – Village People	✔	✔	✔	✔
2	Alexandre Sookia	One – U2	✔	—	✔	—
3	Enrico Marcorina	Prendre racine – Calogero	—	—	—	—
4	Incantèsimu	Zombie – The Cranberries	✔	✔	—	✔
5	Alex Ohen	Happy – Pharrell Williams	—	—	—	—
6	Sacha Puzos	Crazy in Love – Beyoncé	—	—	—	✔
7	Imane Mchangama	Christine – Christine and the Queens	✔	✔	✔	✔
8	Angelo Powers	Let Me Love You – DJ Snake	—	—	—	✔
9	Audrey Joumas	Just Can't Get Enough – Depeche Mode	✔	✔	✔	✔
10	Leticia Carvalho	All of Me – John Legend	—	—	—	—
11	Matthieu Baronne	Dès que le vent soufflera – Renaud	✔	✔	✔	✔
12	Bulle	Quand j'étais chanteur – Michel Delpech	✔	—	—	—
13	Ophée	One Night Only – Jennifer Hudson	—	—	—	✔

=== Blind auditions 4 ===
Order	Contestant	Song	Coaches' and contestants' choices			
Order	Contestant	Song	Florent	Mika	Zazie	Matt
1	Vincent Vella	Virtual Insanity – Jamiroquai	✔	✔	✔	✔
2	Tectum (Johanna & Dylan)	Over My Shoulder – Mika	—	—	—	—
3	Léman	Vivre ou survivre – Daniel Balavoine	—	—	✔	—
4	Manoah	Man Down – Rihanna	—	—	✔	✔
5	Romain Regnier	Il est où le bonheur – Christophe Maé	✔	—	—	✔
6	Aurelle	Dis-moi – BB Brunes	✔	—	—	✔
7	Marvin Dupré	Let Me Love You – DJ Snake	✔	✔	✔	✔
8	Laurie	Andalouse – Kendji Girac	—	—	—	—
9	Morgan Auger	Natural Blues – Moby	—	✔	—	✔
10	Alexandra de Blasi	Je te pardonne – Maître Gims	—	—	—	—
11	Damien Trautmann	Many Rivers to Cross – Jimmy Cliff	✔	✔	✔	✔
12	Quentin Nicodémi	Ne me quitte pas – Jacques Brel	—	—	—	—
13	Colour of Rice	Fast Car – Tracy Chapman	✔	—	✔	✔

=== Blind auditions 5 ===
Order	Contestant	Song	Coaches' and contestants' choices			
Order	Contestant	Song	Florent	Mika	Zazie	Matt
1	JJ (Jérémy Desforges)	Baby I'm Yours – Breakbot	✔	✔	✔	✔
2	Marie Goudier	La vie par procuration – Jean-Jacques Goldman	—	—	—	—
3	Ann-Shirley Ngoussa	Hometown Glory – Adele	✔	✔	✔	✔
4	Guylaine	Vissi d'Arte – Giacomo Puccini	✔	✔	—	—
5	DeLaurentis (Cécile Léogé)	Ring My Bell – Anita Ward	✔	—	✔	✔
6	Jérome	Don't Be So Shy – Imany	—	—	—	—
7	Claire Gautier	Nightcall – Kavinsky	—	✔	✔	—
8	Julie Menet	Who's Lovin' You - Jackson 5	—	—	—	—
9	Clément Albertini	Ça fait mal – Christophe Maé	—	—	—	—
10	Lucie Vagenheim	It's a Man's Man's Man's World – James Brown	✔	✔	✔	✔
11	Vincent Richardson	All I Ask – Adele	—	—	—	✔
12	Juliette	Ces idées-là – Louis Bertignac	✔	✔	—	✔
13	Adee Pi	Summertime – Ella Fitzgerald	—	—	—	—
14	Lidia Isac	Ordinaire – Robert Charlebois	✔	—	—	—

=== Blind auditions 6 ===
Order	Contestant	Song	Coaches' and contestants' choices			
Order	Contestant	Song	Florent	Mika	Zazie	Matt
1	Elsa Roses	Somewhere Only We Know – Keane	✔	✔	✔	—
2	R'nold (Arnold Aglaé)	Writing's on the Wall – Sam Smith	✔	✔	✔	✔
3	Andréa Durand	Désenchantée – Mylène Farmer	✔	—	—	✔
4	Nicola Cavallaro	Fallin' – Alicia Keys	✔	✔	✔	✔
5	Kelly	Paname – Slimane	—	—	—	—
6	Marianne Aya Omac	La Llorona – Chant traditionnel mexicain	✔	✔	✔	—
7	The SugaZz	American Boy – Estelle	—	✔	✔	—
8	Gianni Bee (Gianni Berardi)	Wicked Game – Chris Isaak	✔	—	—	—
9	Lou Mai	Bohemian Rhapsody – Queen	✔	✔	✔	✔
10	Nyco Lilliu (Nicolas Lilliu)	What Goes Around...Comes Around – Justin Timberlake	—	—	—	✔
11	Kuku	Redemption Song – Bob Marley	✔	—	—	✔
12	Clarisse Mây	Summertime Sadness – Lana Del Rey	—	—	—	—
13	Dilomé (Alex Blanchet)	Madame rêve – Alain Bashung	—	✔	✔	✔

=== Blind auditions 7 ===
Order	Contestant	Song	Coaches' and contestants' choices			
Order	Contestant	Song	Florent	Mika	Zazie	Matt
1	Estelle	The House of the Rising Sun – The Animals	—	—	—	—
2	Shaby	Natural Woman – Aretha Franklin	✔	✔	✔	✔
3	Chloé	Skinny Love – Birdy	✔	✔	—	—
4	Enzo	One Day / Reckoning Song – Asaf Avidan	—	—	—	✔
5	Kelly	Raggamuffin – Selah Sue	—	—	—	—
6	Valentin F	Your Song – Elton John	—	✔	✔	—
7	Juliette Moisan	Marcia Baila – Rita Mitsouko	—	—	—	—
8	Sofia Landgren	Forever Young – Alphaville	✔	✔	—	✔
9	Jules Couturier	Digital Love – Daft Punk	—	—	✔	—
10	Valentin Stuff	Pull marine – Isabelle Adjani	✔	—	—	—
11	Adrien Fruit	Châtelet Les Halles – Florent Pagny	—	—	—	—
12	Fabian	Quand c'est ? – Stromae	—	—	✔	—
13	Lisa Mistretta	Mamma Knows Best – Jessie J	✔	—	—	✔

== Battles ==
Color key

Artist wins the battle
Artist loses the battle
Artist is stolen by another coach and goes to Épreuves Ultimes (Knockout Round)
Artist was stolen but is switched later with another artist and is eliminated

=== Battles 1 ===
Order	Coach	Artists		Song	Coaches' and artists choices			
Order	Coach	Winner	Loser	Song	Florent	Mika	Zazie	Matt
1	Matt	Lisandro Cuxi	Angelo Powers	Runnin' – Naughty Boy feat. Beyoncé & Arrow Benjamin	—	—	—	—N/a
2	Zazie	Nicola Cavallaro	Jules Couturier	Too Close – Alex Clare	—	—	—N/a	—
3	Florent	Shaby	Camille Esteban	Cheap Thrills – Sia	—N/a	—	—	✔
4	Mika	Incantèsimu	Morgan Auger	Streets of Philadelphia – Bruce Springsteen	—	—N/a	—	—
5	Matt	Sacha	Enzo	Alter ego – Jean-Louis Aubert	—	—	—	—N/a
6	Zazie	Marius	Léman	Sunday Bloody Sunday – U2	—	✔	—N/a	—
7	Mika	Vincent Vinel	Guylaine	Love Me, Please Love Me – Michel Polnareff	—	—N/a	—	—
8	Matt	Ann-Shirley Ngoussa	Ophée	Juste après – Fredericks Goldman Jones	—	—	—	—N/a
9	Mika	Lou Mai	Claire Gautier	Lost on You – LP	—	—N/a	✔	—
10	Florent	Chloé	Damien Trautmann	Déjeuner en paix – Stephan Eicher	—N/a	—	—	—

=== Battles 2 ===
Order	Coach	Artists		Song	Coaches' and artists choices			
Order	Coach	Winner	Loser(s)	Song	Florent	Mika	Zazie	Matt
1	Mika	The SugaZz	JJ	Fiche le camp, Jack – Richard Anthony	—	—N/a	—	—
2	Zazie	Emmy Liana	Dilomé	L'Aigle noir – Barbara	—	✔	—N/a	✔
3	Matt	Karla	Lisa Mistretta	Bang Bang – Jessie J, Ariana Grande & Nicki Minaj	—	—	—	—N/a
3	Matt	Karla	Lily Berry	Bang Bang – Jessie J, Ariana Grande & Nicki Minaj	—	—	—	—N/a
4	Florent	R'nold	Candice Parise	This One's for You – David Guetta feat. Zara Larsson	—N/a	—	—	—
5	Mika	Imane Mchangama	Valentin F	Come – Jain	—	—N/a	—	—
6	Zazie	Hélène Siau	Manoah	Les filles d'aujourd'hui – Vianney & Joyce Jonathan	—	✔	—N/a	—
7	Florent	Gianni Bee	Bulle	Goodbye My Lover – James Blunt	—N/a	—	—	—
8	Matt	Andréa Durand	Vincent Richardson	N'importe quoi – Florent Pagny	—	—	—	—N/a
9	Florent	Kap's	Lidia Isac	When a man loves a woman – Percy Sledge	—N/a	—	—	—
10	Mika	Juliette	Samuel M	La Groupie du pianiste – France Gall	—	—N/a	—	—
11	Zazie	Audrey Joumas	Julia Paul	Rolling in the Deep – Adele	✔	—	—N/a	—

=== Battles 3 ===
Order	Coach	Artists		Song	Coaches' and artists choices			
Order	Coach	Winner	Loser	Song	Florent	Mika	Zazie	Matt
1	Florent	Lucie Vagenheim	Syrine	Can't Feel My Face – The Weeknd	—N/a	—	—	—
2	Mika	Marvin Dupré	Élise Mélinand	Fast Car – Jonas Blue feat. Dakota	—	—N/a	—	—
3	Zazie	Will Barber	DeLaurentis	Thank U – Alanis Morissette	—	—	—N/a	—
4	Matt	Ry'm	Aurelle	For Me Formidable – Charles Aznavour	—	—	—	—N/a
5	Florent	Nathalia	Valentin Stuff	Je te pardonne – Maître Gims feat. Sia	—N/a	—	✔	—
6	Zazie	Alexandre Sookia	Colour of Rice	Je t'aimais, je t'aime et je t'aimerai – Francis Cabrel	—	—	—N/a	—
6	Zazie	Alexandre Sookia	Elsa Roses	Je t'aimais, je t'aime et je t'aimerai – Francis Cabrel	—	—	—N/a	—
7	Mika	Agathe Denoirjean	Sofia Landgren	We Don't Talk Anymore – Charlie Puth feat. Selena Gomez	—	—N/a	—	—
8	Matt	Vincent Vella	Fonetyk et Dama	Hall of Fame – The Script feat. will.i.am	—	—	—	—N/a
9	Zazie	Matthieu Baronne	Fabian	Aussi libre que moi – Calogero	—	—	—N/a	—
10	Florent	Marianne Aya Omac	Romain Regnier	Un homme debout – Claudio Capéo	—N/a	—	—	—
11	Matt	Nyco Liliu	Kuku	Hey Ya! – Outkast	—	—	—	—N/a

== Épreuves Ultimes (Knockout round) ==
Color key

Artist wins the knockout and goes through the Live Shows
Artist loses the knockout
Artist is stolen by another coach and goes to the Live Shows

=== Épreuves Ultimes 1 ===
Order	Coach	Winner	Song	Losers	Songs	Steals			
Order	Coach	Winner	Song	Losers	Songs	Florent	Mika	Zazie	Matt
1	Mika	Vincent Vinel	Don't Stop Believin' – Journey	Marvin Dupré	La Ballade de Jim – Alain Souchon	—	—N/a	✔	—
1	Mika	Vincent Vinel	Don't Stop Believin' – Journey	Manoah	Down on My Knees – Ayọ	—	—N/a	—N/a	—
2	Mika	Imane Mchangama	"Open Season (Une autre saison)"	Juliette	Fallin' – Alicia Keys	—	—N/a	—N/a	—
2	Mika	Imane Mchangama	"Open Season (Une autre saison)"	Lou Mai	Le Coup de Soleil – Richard Cocciante	—	—N/a	—N/a	—
3	Mika	The SugaZz	Smells Like Teen Spirit – Nirvana	Agathe	Fais moi mal Johnny – Boris Vian	—	—N/a	—N/a	—
3	Mika	The SugaZz	Smells Like Teen Spirit – Nirvana	Incantèsimu	Diego – Michel Berger	—	—N/a	—N/a	—
4	Florent Pagny	Shaby	Mourir dans tes yeux – Jenifer	R'nold	SOS d'un terrien en détresse – Daniel Balavoine	—N/a	—	—N/a	—
4	Florent Pagny	Shaby	Mourir dans tes yeux – Jenifer	Kap's	Paradis perdus – Christine and the Queens	—N/a	—	—N/a	—
5	Florent Pagny	Lucie Vagenheim	Je l'aime à mourir – Francis Cabrel	Chloé	Losing My Religion – R.E.M	—N/a	—	—N/a	—
5	Florent Pagny	Lucie Vagenheim	Je l'aime à mourir – Francis Cabrel	Gianni Bee	Creep – Radiohead	—N/a	—	—N/a	—
6	Florent Pagny	Julia Paul	Je m'en vais – Vianney	Marianne Aya Omac	Nothing Compares 2 U – Sinéad O'Connor	—N/a	—	—N/a	—
6	Florent Pagny	Julia Paul	Je m'en vais – Vianney	Nathalia	Travesti – Nanette Workman	—N/a	—	—N/a	—

=== Épreuves Ultimes 2 ===
Order	Coach	Winner	Song	Losers	Songs	Steals			
Order	Coach	Winner	Song	Losers	Songs	Florent	Mika	Zazie	Matt
1	Zazie	Emmy Liana	Feeling Good – Nina Simone	Alexandre Sookia	Lean On – Major Lazer feat. MØ	—	—	—N/a	—
1	Zazie	Emmy Liana	Feeling Good – Nina Simone	Marius	Être un homme comme vous – Richard Anthony	—	—	—N/a	✔
2	Zazie	Matthieu Baronne	Fresh – Kool & The Gang	Hélène Siau	Roxanne – Police	✔	—	—N/a	—N/a
2	Zazie	Matthieu Baronne	Fresh – Kool & The Gang	Valentin Stuff	Life on Mars? – David Bowie	—N/a	—	—N/a	—N/a
3	Zazie	Nicola Cavallaro	Quelqu'un m'a dit – Carla Bruni	Audrey Joumas	J'ai la mémoire qui flanche – Jeanne Moreau	—N/a	✔	—N/a	—N/a
3	Zazie	Nicola Cavallaro	Quelqu'un m'a dit – Carla Bruni	Will Barber	J'aime regarder les filles – Patrick Coutin	—N/a	—N/a	—N/a	—N/a
4	Matt Pokora	Ann-Shirley Ngoussa	Kiss from a rose – Seal	Andréa Durand	All That She Wants – Ace of Base	—N/a	—N/a	—N/a	—N/a
4	Matt Pokora	Ann-Shirley Ngoussa	Kiss from a rose – Seal	Ry'm	Stressed Out – Twenty One Pilots	—N/a	—N/a	—N/a	—N/a
5	Matt Pokora	Lisandro Cuxi	Elle m'a aimé – Kendji Girac	Karla	J'y crois encore – Lara Fabian	—N/a	—N/a	—N/a	—N/a
5	Matt Pokora	Lisandro Cuxi	Elle m'a aimé – Kendji Girac	Vincent Vella	Le ballet – Céline Dion	—N/a	—N/a	—N/a	—N/a
6	Matt Pokora	Dilomé	Human – Rag'n'Bone Man	Sacha Puzos	The Sound of Silence – Simon & Garfunkel	—N/a	—N/a	—N/a	—N/a
6	Matt Pokora	Dilomé	Human – Rag'n'Bone Man	Nyco Liliu	Pas toi – Jean-Jacques Goldman	—N/a	—N/a	—N/a	—N/a

== Lives ==
=== Lives 1: 20 May 2017 ===
Order	Coach	Contestant	Song	Result
1	Mika	The SugaZz	Papaoutai – Stromae	Eliminated
2	Mika	Imane Mchangama	Quelque chose de Tennessee – Johnny Hallyday	Saved by Mika
3	Mika	Vincent Vinel	Somebody To Love – Queen	Saved by public
4	Mika	Audrey Joumas	The Shoop Shoop Song – Betty Everett	Saved by public
5	Florent Pagny	Hélène Siau	La Ceinture – Élodie Frégé	Saved by public
6	Florent Pagny	Shaby	This Girl – Kungs	Saved by Florent
7	Florent Pagny	Julia Paul	L'Encre de tes yeux – Francis Cabrel	Eliminated
8	Florent Pagny	Lucie Vagenheim	Billie Jean – Michael Jackson	Saved by public
9	Zazie	Emmy Liana	California Dreamin' – The Mamas and the Papas / Sia	Eliminated
10	Zazie	Nicola Cavallaro	Caruso – Lucio Dalla	Saved by public
11	Zazie	Marvin Dupré	Starboy – The Weeknd feat. Daft Punk	Saved by public
12	Zazie	Matthieu Baronne	Requiem pour un con – Serge Gainsbourg	Saved by Zazie
13	Matt Pokora	Ann-Shirley Ngoussa	A Sky Full of Stars – Coldplay	Saved by Matt
14	Matt Pokora	Dilomé	Savoir aimer – Florent Pagny	Eliminated
15	Matt Pokora	Lisandro Cuxi	24k Magic – Bruno Mars	Saved by public
16	Matt Pokora	Marius	Quand on a que l'amour – Jacques Brel	Saved by public

=== Lives 2: 27 May 2017 ===
Order	Coach	Contestant	Song	Result
1	Matt Pokora	Marius	Wake Me Up Before You Go-Go – Wham!	Eliminated
2	Matt Pokora	Lisandro Cuxi	Love on the Brain – Rihanna	Saved by public
3	Matt Pokora	Ann-Shirley Ngoussa	Marcel – Christophe Maé	Saved by Matt
4	Zazie	Matthieu Baronne	With or Without You – U2	Saved by Zazie
5	Zazie	Marvin Dupré	Le Paradis blanc – Michel Berger	Eliminated
6	Zazie	Nicola Cavallaro	Castle on the hill – Ed Sheeran	Saved by public
7	Florent Pagny	Hélène Siau	Castle in the Snow – The Avener feat. Kadebostany	Eliminated
8	Florent Pagny	Shaby	I Will Always Love You – Whitney Houston	Saved by public
9	Florent Pagny	Lucie Vagenheim	Saint Claude – Christine and the Queens	Saved by Florent
10	Mika	Audrey Joumas	La plus belle pour aller danser – Sylvie Vartan	Saved by public
11	Mika	Imane Mchangama	Get Lucky – Daft Punk feat. Pharrell Williams	Eliminated
12	Mika	Vincent Vinel	Feel – Robbie Williams	Saved by Mika

=== Semi-finals: 3 June 2017 ===
In the semi-finals and the finals, the two best candidates per team qualify in each team.

Votes are based on 150 points in total: Each coach would place his 50 points between his final 2 contestants. He should not distribute them equally but should give advantage to one of his /her two finalists. The votes of the public will be allocated based on votes for a total of 100 points. One contestant per team reaches the final.

Order	Coach	Contestant	Song	Coach vote result /50	Public vote result /100	Total Points /150	Result
1	Florent Pagny	Lucie Vagenheim	Halo – Beyoncé	26	60.8	86.8	Go through the Live Final
2	Florent Pagny	Shaby	Entrer dans la lumière – Patricia Kaas	24	39.2	63.2	Eliminated in Semi-finals
	Florent Pagny	Duet (Lucie & Shaby)	Stayin' Alive - The Bee Gees				
3	Zazie	Matthieu Baronne	Don't Stop Me Now – Queen	24	23.3	47.3	Eliminated in Semi-finals
4	Zazie	Nicola Cavallaro	Margeurite – Richard Cocciante	26	76.7	102.7	Go through the Live Final
	Zazie	Duet (Nicola & Matthieu)	Way Down We Go - Kaleo				
5	Matt Pokora	Ann-Shirley Ngoussa	True Colors – Cyndi Lauper	24	23.3	47.3	Eliminated in Semi-finals
6	Matt Pokora	Lisandro Cuxi	Si seulement je pouvais lui manquer – Calogero	26	79.7	105.7	Go through the Live Final
	Matt Pokora	Duet (Lisandro & Ann-Shirley)	Without You - David Guetta feat. Usher				
7	Mika	Audrey Joumas	Grace Kelly – Mika	27	45.8	72.8	Eliminated in Semi-finals
8	Mika	Vincent Vinel	Earth Song – Michael Jackson	23	54.2	77.2	Go through the Live Final
	Mika	Duet (Audrey & Vincent)	Comic Strip - Serge Gainsbourg				

=== Finals: 10 June 2017 ===
All performances of the evening
Order	Coach	Contestant	Song	Duet with
1		The 4 Finalists	I Feel It Coming - The Weeknd feat. Daft Punk	
2	Mika	Vincent Vinel	Take On Me - a-ha	
3	Zazie	Nicola Cavallaro	Your Song - Elton John	
4	Florent Pagny	Lucie Vagenheim	New York, New York - Frank Sinatra	
5	Matt Pokora	Lisandro Cuxi	L'envie d'aimer - Daniel Lévi	
6	Zazie	Nicola Cavallaro	As - George Michael & Mary J. Blige	Nolwenn Leroy
7	Matt Pokora	Lisandro Cuxi	Mon Everest - Soprano & Marina Kaye	Soprano
8	Florent Pagny	Lucie Vagenheim	Comme Moi - Black M feat. Shakira	Shakira & Black M
9	Mika	Vincent Vinel	La Musique - Calogero	Calogero
10	Florent Pagny	Lucie Vagenheim	J'oublierai ton nom - Johnny Hallyday	Florent Pagny
11	Matt Pokora	Lisandro Cuxi	Cry Me a River - Justin Timberlake	Matt Pokora
12	Mika	Vincent Vinel	Yesterday - John Lennon	Mika
13	Zazie	Nicola Cavallaro	Time After Time - Cyndi Lauper	Zazie
14		Slimane Nebchi	J'en suis là - Slimane Nebchi	

Final rating
Coach	Contestant	Results of the public vote	Status
Mika	Vincent Vinel	23.7	3rd Place
Zazie	Nicola Cavallaro	17.8	4th Place
Florent Pagny	Lucie Vagenheim	26.0	Runner-up
Matt Pokora	Lisandro Cuxi	32.4	Winner
