= Ovidiu Anton =

Romanian singer-songwriter

- Born: 24 February 1983 (age 43); Bucharest, Socialist Republic of Romania
- Genres: Rock, hard rock, heavy metal, pop rock
- Occupation: Singer-songwriter
- Instruments: Guitar, piano

Ovidiu Anton (Romanian pronunciation: [oˈvidju anˈton]; born 24 February 1983 in Bucharest) is a Romanian singer-songwriter. He was to represent Romania in the Eurovision Song Contest 2016 with the song "Moment of Silence", but Romania was forced to withdraw from the contest on 22 April 2016. His song got the most points from the jury, in the semifinal on March 4, but also the most votes from viewers, in the final on March 6. He participated in Selecția Națională five times so far: 2010, with Pasager band – "Running Out Of Time", 2012 – "I Walk Alone", 2013 – "Run Away With Me", 2015 – "Still Alive".

== Early life ==
Anton went on stage for the first time at age six. He studied modern canto, classic guitar and piano at the Music School.

== Career ==
Wanting to compose and perform rock music, in 1998, he formed the band Carpe Diem; he toured with the band until 2002.

He won the second place at Interpretation section of the Mamaia National Festival 2003 with his own song, Vreau ("I Want"), and between 2004 and 2006 was named valedictorian of Star School (Romanian: Școala Vedetelor), second edition, production organized by the Romanian Television. Ovidiu represented Romania at the Golden Stag International Festival in 2005, and from 2008 until May 2012 he was the soloist of Pasager band with whom he performed hundreds of concerts and participated in Eurovision 2010 national selection. Along the same band, he won the second place at Rock section of the Mamaia National Festival 2011.

Anton won the Romanian national selection for the Eurovision Song Contest 2016, but on 22 April 2016, it was announced that TVR were suspended from the European Broadcasting Union, as TVR repeatedly failed to pay their debt of CHF 16 million (€14.56 million, US$16.4 million) to the EBU. As a result, Anton and his song were both forced to withdraw from the contest. Despite the withdrawal, the song was included on the contest's album, as it was produced before Romania was suspended.

== Personal life ==
Ovidiu Anton is married to Diana, with whom he has a 12-year-old daughter, Adela.

Ovidiu is a dog breeder in Romania, as owner of Praetorian Staff kennel. He participates in many competitions dedicated to quadrupeds.
