= Eduard Romanyuta =

Ukrainian singer (born 1992)

Eduard Romanyuta Едуард Романюта
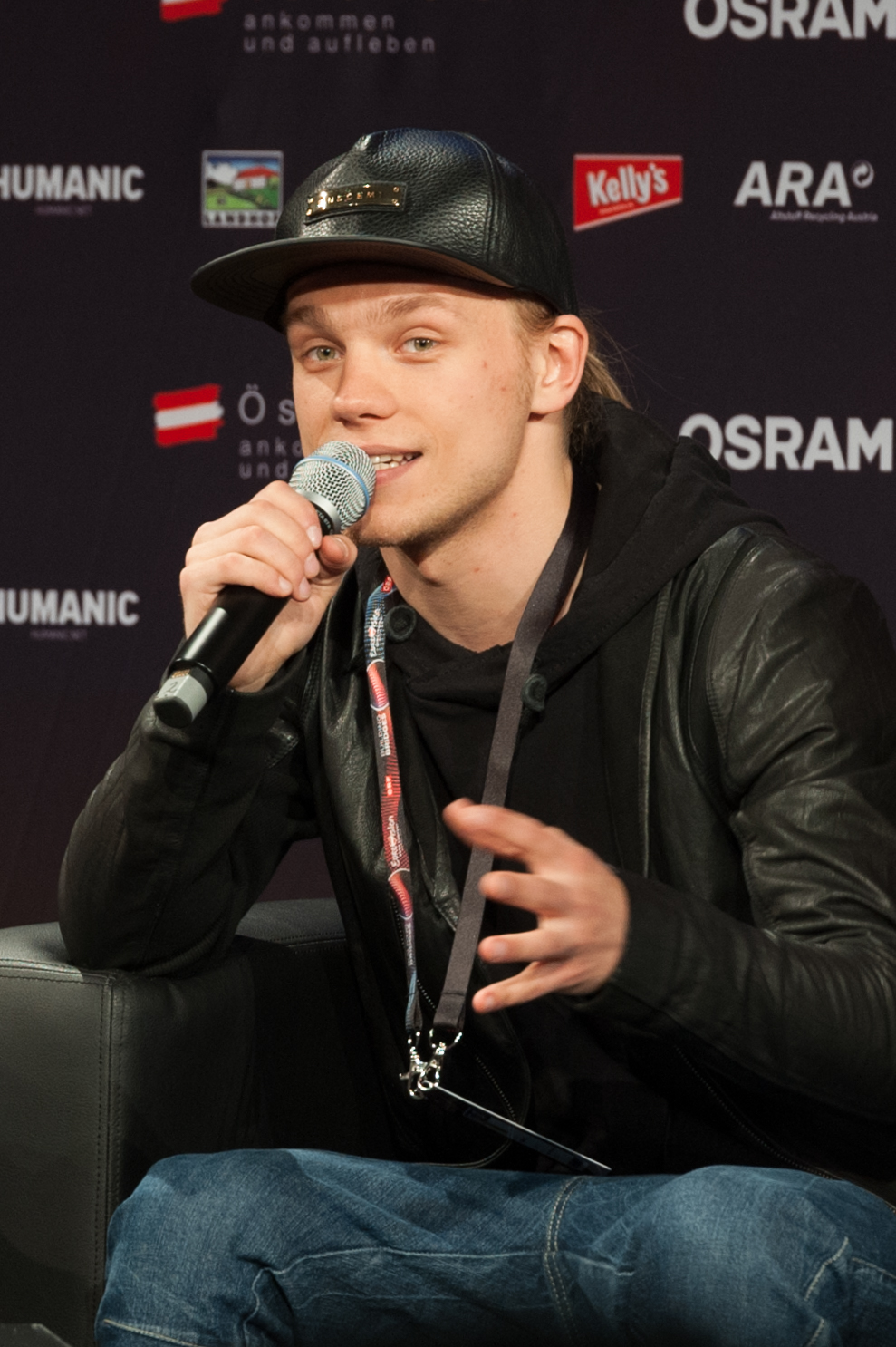
- Romanyuta at the Eurovision Song Contest 2015

Background information
- Also known as: Eduard Romanyuta
- Born: Eduard Eduardovych Romanyuta; 23 October 1992 (age 33); Ternopil, Ukraine
- Genres: Pop; dance-pop; soul
- Occupation: Singer
- Instrument: Vocals
- Years active: 1996–present
- Website: eduardromanyuta.com romanyuta.com.ua

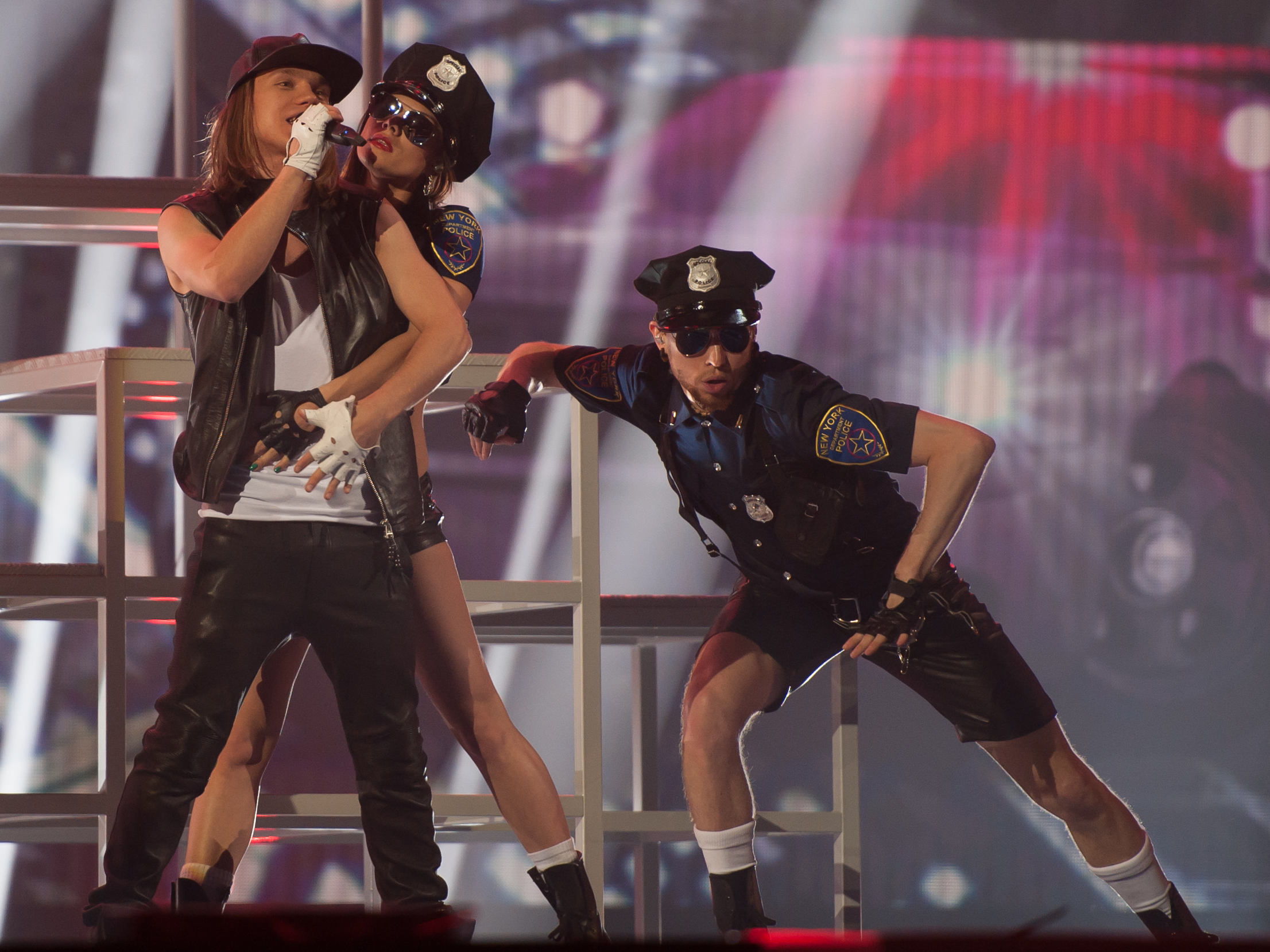
Eduard Romanyuta 2015

Eduard Eduardovych Romanyuta (Ukrainian: Едуард Едуардович Романюта; born 23 October 1992) is a Ukrainian singer. He represented Moldova in the Eurovision Song Contest 2015 with his song "I Want Your Love", which failed to qualify for the Contest's grand final.

== Early life and early career ==
Romanyuta was born in the city of Ternopil, located in the west of Ukraine. He started his creative activities at the age of four. Already at the age of five, Eduard performed in the Palace Ukraine in Kyiv, where personally president of Ukraine L. Kuchma praised him for the excellence of his talent. Between 1999 and 2002, he participated in the event “President’s Christmas Trees", held also in Kyiv, giving more than 170 performances. In his childhood, Romanyuta received more awards at different events, including "The Pearl of the South" (Ukraine), "Italian magic" (Italy), "Song magic" (Bulgaria), "Slavic Bazaar" (Ukraine), "Stars on stage" (Ukraine), "Song Vernissage" (Ukraine) and "Sunny Skiff" (Ukraine). In 2003, Romanyuta released his first full-length record entitled "Colors of the native land".

=== Musical career ===
In 2004, Eduard Romanyuta was awarded by the prime minister of Ukraine with a diploma and a medal for his talent. Among his awards there were the national titles "Child of the Year", "Young talent" and others.

In 2012, together with the Swedish publishers “Cosmos Music Group", "Famous music" and "19 songs" Eduard released the single "I'll never let go". With this track, the singer became a finalist of the Ukrainian national selection for Eurovision 2012. With the same song Eduard Romanyuta became the winner in the categories "Best song in a foreign language" and "Video of the year” at the awards ceremony "OE Music Awards".

In the result of the fruitful cooperation with the Swedish publishers he released 3 other tracks in 2012: "Betray" together with "Starlab Publishing", "Conspiracy" with "Snowflake Music Publishing, also, in collaboration with “Cosmos Music Publishing", he released the single "Get real with my heart”, which took part in the Ukrainian national selection of "Eurovision 2013", and came third. Video for the song "Get real with my heart" was shot by "Hollywood World Studious" in Los Angeles, California, USA and successfully scored numerous hits on YouTube channels and Vevo. In 2012, Eduard took part in the show of the First National Ukrainian channel "10+10", where he performed duets with Sofo Gelovani, subsequently, the representative of Georgia at Eurovision 2013.

In 2013, he shared performances with groups t.A.T.u, Stereo Plaza, Kyiv and Gorky Park on Automotofest, at Kyiv Ice Stadium.

In 2013, together with the Swedish publishers "Universal Music Publisher”, he released the track "Nightmare". In the same year, in cooperation with the "Roasting House Music", "Jazzell Music" and "Wicked Night Music" released the track "Reckless". Also in 2013 he released the song "No regrets", words and music by British authors. Recently, Eduard Romanyuta has released an audio-visual album "Conspiracy", which includes 13 tracks and 7 videos. In 2014 the Swedish publishing "The Kennel" and especially for the Ukrainian selection of "Eurovision 2015" the song "I want your love" was created. However, since Ukraine refused to participate in the contest, the song participated and won the national selection of the Moldovan national selection and thus represented Moldova in the Eurovision Song Contest 2015 in Vienna, Austria.

In his 22 years, the singer is an independent artist with his own label. In parallel with the creative work he completed higher education and won two master's degrees with honors. Currently he is studying at the post-graduate school of TNEU and working on his PhD thesis in international competition of tax systems and tax policy of Ukraine in the context of Euro integration.

==== Eurovision Song Contest 2011 ====
On 26 February 2011, Eduard attempted to represent his home country, Ukraine at the Eurovision Song Contest 2011 with his song Berega and finished seventh place in a field of nineteen.

==== Eurovision Song Contest 2012 ====
On 18 February 2012, Eduard made his second attempt to represent Ukraine at the Eurovision Song Contest 2012 with his song "I'll never let go". He placed fifth in the field of twenty-one entries.

==== Eurovision Song Contest 2013 ====
On 23 December 2012, Eduard made his third attempt to represent Ukraine at the Eurovision Song Contest 2013 with "Get Real With My Heart" where he placed third in the field of twenty entries.

==== Eurovision Song Contest 2015 ====
On 17 January 2015, Eduard participated in the live auditions for O Melodie Pentru Europa 2015 (the Moldovan national finals) and qualified into the first semi-finals that took place on 24 February 2015. He then qualified for the finals of the contest that took place on 28 February 2015 where he landed first place with 84 points from the juries and 13,500 votes from the televoting public. He represented Moldova in the Eurovision Song Contest 2015 but failed to qualify.

== See also ==
- Moldova in the Eurovision Song Contest 2015

Awards and achievements
Preceded by Cristina Scarlat with "Wild Soul"	Moldova in the Eurovision Song Contest; 2015	Succeeded by Lidia Isac with "Falling Stars"
