= Radio Moldova Tineret =

Youth-oriented radio station in Moldova

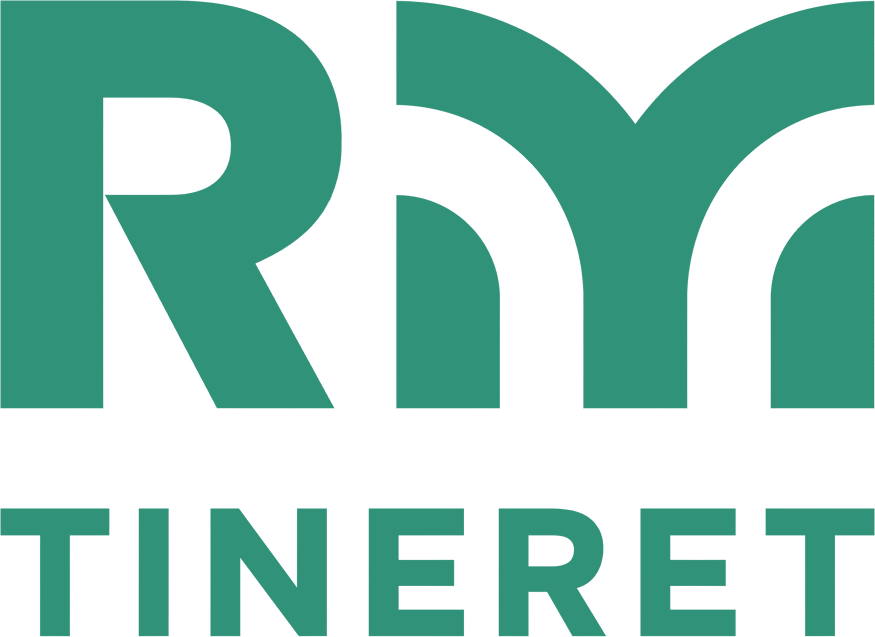
- Type: Radio network
- Country: Moldova

Programming
- Language(s): Romanian

Ownership
- Owner: Teleradio-Moldova

History
- Launch date: October 30, 2012; 12 years ago

Coverage
- Availability: International

Links
- Website: Radio Moldova Tineret

Radio Moldova Tineret is a youth-oriented radio station, owned by the public broadcaster TRM. It's the first niche-oriented station from the public broadcaster, and its target audience is Moldovan youth. It was launched on 30 October 2012, at 6 o'clock in Bălți, transmitting live on 99.4 FM and on its website.

Radio Moldova Tineret will broadcast soon on these frequencies:

- Varniţa, Anenii Noi, pe frecvența 104.0 FM
- Nisporeni – 103.8 FM
- Copanca – 103.6 FM
- Sărata-Galbenă – 107.1 FM

== See also ==
- TeleRadio-Moldova
- Radio Moldova
- TV Moldova 1
- TV Moldova Internaţional
