= Lidia Isac =

Moldovan singer

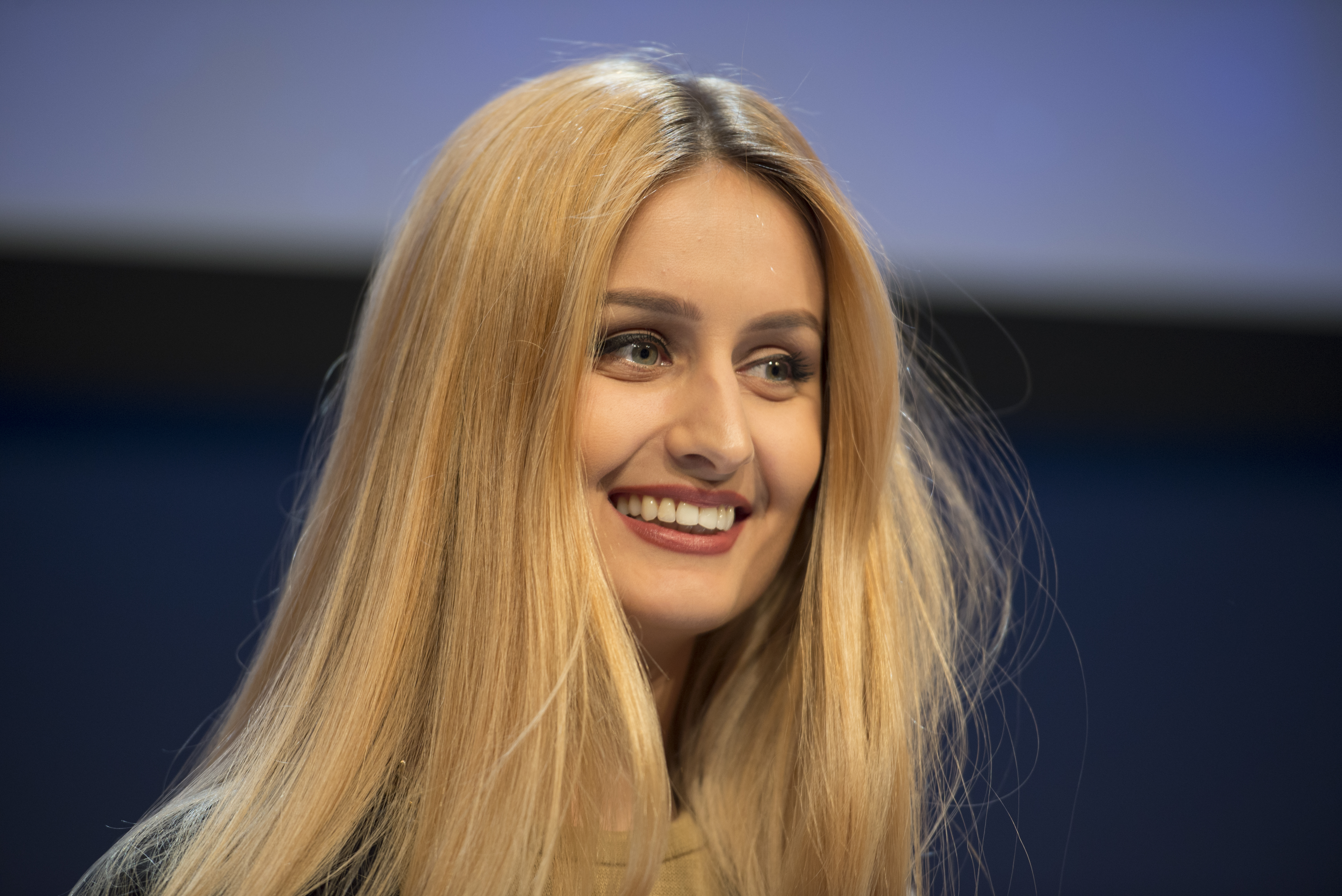
- Isac in 2016

Background information
- Born: 27 March 1993 (age 33); Saint Petersburg, Russia
- Origin: Chișinău, Moldova
- Genre: Pop
- Occupations: Singer; journalist
- Instruments: Vocals; piano
- Years active: 2013–present

Lidia Isac (Romanian pronunciation: [ˈlidia iˈsak]; born 27 March 1993) is a Russian-born Moldovan singer. She represented Moldova in the Eurovision Song Contest 2016 with the song "Falling Stars". She is also known for her participation in the sixth season of The Voice: la plus belle voix, and the seventh season of Vocea României.

== Early life and education ==
Isac was born on 27 March 1993 in Saint Petersburg, Russia, where her Moldovan parents met during their studies. When she was a few months old, they moved back to Moldova.

Isac graduated from the Faculty of Journalism and Communication Sciences at the Moldova State University in 2015.

== Career ==
=== 2013–2015: Glam Girls and solo career ===
Isac began her musical career as part of the duo Glam Girls, which she formed with Sasha Druc. In 2013, they participated in O melodie pentru Europa 2013, the Moldovan national selection for the Eurovision Song Contest, alongside Cristina V with the song "Celebrate". They finished twelfth in the final.

One year later, the duo entered O melodie pentru Europa 2014 with the song "You Believed in Me", but did not advance to the final. In the same year, Isac was a finalist in the annual music competition New Wave, held in Jūrmala, Latvia. In 2015, Isac entered O melodie pentru Europa 2015 twice: as part of Glam Girls with the song "Magia", and as a solo act with the song "I Can't Breathe". Both entries advanced to the final, where they tied for the fourteenth and last place.

=== 2016: Eurovision Song Contest ===
In 2016, Isac participated in O melodie pentru Europa once again, this time with the song "Falling Stars". She went on to win the competition, thereby winning the right to represent Moldova in the Eurovision Song Contest 2016 in Stockholm, Sweden. To promote her entry, an acoustic French version of the song, entitled "Pluie d'étoiles", was recorded. She ultimately finished in seventeenth place in the first semi-final on 10 May 2016.

=== 2017: The Voice ===
In 2017, Isac was a contestant in the sixth season of The Voice: la plus belle voix, the French version of The Voice. She advanced from the Blind Auditions, joining the team of Florent Pagny, and was eliminated in the Battle rounds. Later that year, she also featured in the seventh season of the Romanian version Vocea României. She joined the team of Tudor Chirilă after her Blind Audition, and was eliminated in the Live Shows.

The Voice performances and results
Country	Round	Song	Original artist	Result
France	Blind Auditions	"Ordinaire"	Robert Charlebois	Joined team Florent Pagny
France	The Battles	"When a Man Loves a Woman"	Percy Sledge	Eliminated
Romania	Blind Auditions	"When We Were Young"	Adele	Joined team Tudor Chirilă
Romania	The Battles	"The Story"	Brandi Carlile	Advanced
Romania	Live Shows	"There Must Be an Angel (Playing with My Heart)"	Eurythmics	Eliminated

== Discography ==
=== As lead artist ===
Title	Year	Album
"I Can't Breathe"	2015	Non-album single
"Falling Stars"	2016	Non-album single
"Aproape"	2018	Non-album single
"Nomada"	2019	Non-album single
"Забудем до завтра" (with OZ Drive)	2020	Non-album single
"Mâinile sus"	2020	Non-album single

=== As part of Glam Girls ===
Title	Year	Album
"Celebrate" (with Cristina V)	2013	Non-album single
"You Believed in Me"	2014	Non-album single
"Magia"	2015	Non-album single

Awards and achievements
Preceded by Eduard Romanyuta with "I Want Your Love"	Moldova in the Eurovision Song Contest; 2016	Succeeded by SunStroke Project with "Hey, Mamma!"
