= The Voice: la plus belle voix season 1 =

The Voice: la plus belle voix
- Season 1
- Hosted by: Nikos Aliagas; Virginie de Clausade
- Judges: Florent Pagny, Jenifer, Louis Bertignac, Garou
- Winner: Stephan Rizon

Release
- Original network: TF1
- Original release: February 25 – May 12, 2012

Season chronology
- Next → Season 2

The Voice: la plus belle voix (season 1) was the first season of the French reality singing competition, created by media tycoon John de Mol. It was aired from February 2012 to May 2012 on TF1.

One of the important premises of the show is the quality of the singing talent. Four coaches, themselves popular performing artists, train the talents in their group and occasionally perform with them. Talents are selected in blind auditions, where the coaches cannot see, but only hear the auditioner.

The coaches were Florent Pagny, Jenifer, Louis Bertignac and Garou. The First Season ended on May 12, 2012, Stephan Rizon was declared the winner.

== Overview ==
– Winning Coach/Contestant. Winner and finalists are in bold, eliminated contestants in small font.
– Runner-Up Coach/Contestant. Final contestant first listed.
– 2nd Runner-Up Coach/Contestant. Final contestant first listed.

Liste des candidats par coach
Garou	Jenifer	Florent Pagny	Louis Bertignac
Louis Delort; Atef Sedkaoui; Bruce Johnson; Damien Schmitt; Emma Durand; Flo Malley; Jessica Plesel; Jhony Maalouf; Kristel Adams; Blandine Aggery; Ludivine Aubourg; Sofia Mountassir; Stéphanie Bédard	Al.Hy; Amalya Delepierre; Ange Fandoh; Florian Veneziano; Hailé; Julia Cinna; K. Lina Lamara; Maureen Angot; Sacha Tran; Sonia Lacen; Thomas Mignot	**Stéphan Rizon**; Dalila; Dominique Magloire; Elodie Balestra; Estelle Micheau; Greg Ingrao; Jua Amir; Linda; Lise Darly; Alban Bartoli; Stéphanie Lamia; Valérie Delgado; Véronick Sévère	Aude Henneville; Brenda Cardullo; Cécile Citadelle; Christophe Berthier; Louise; Mister John Lewis; Patrice Carmona; Pauline & Julien Thisse; Philippe Tailleferd; Pia Salvia; Rubby; Vigon

== Results ==
=== Step 1 : « Auditions à l'aveugle » (Blind Auditions) ===
The Blind Auditions were taped on 10, 11, 16, 17 and 18 January 2012.

Key	Coach hit his or her "JE VOUS VEUX" button	Contestant eliminated with no coach pressing his or her "JE VOUS VEUX" button	Contestant defaulted to this coach's team	Contestant elected to join this coach's team

==== Episode 1: February 25, 2012 ====
Order	Contestant	Song	Coaches' and Contestants' Choices			
Order	Contestant	Song	Florent	Jenifer	Louis	Garou
1	Flo Malley	Casser la voix - Patrick Bruel	—			
2	Blandine Aggery	Sober - Pink		—		
3	Julie Rosburger	Je suis malade - Serge Lama	—	—	—	—
4	Al.Hy	What's Up - 4 Non Blondes				
5	Greg Ingrao	C'est si bon comme ça - Sinclair		—	—	—
6	Dominique Magloire	Ma gueule - Johnny Hallyday				
7	Philippe Tailleferd	Don't Know Why - Norah Jones		—		—
8	Aurore Crevelier	Pleurer des rivières - Viktor Lazlo	—	—	—	—
9	Lina Lamara	It's a Man's World - James Brown			—	
10	Patrice Carmona	You Raise Me Up - Josh Groban	—			—
11	Louis Delort	Video Games - Lana Del Rey				
12	Miranda Eilo	Someone Like You - Adele	—	—	—	—
13	Thomas Mignot	Grenade - Bruno Mars	—		—	—
14	Damien Schmitt	Ça (c'est vraiment toi) - Téléphone		—		
15	Julien & Pauline Thisse	Il nous faut - Elisa Tovati & Tom Dice	—	—		—
16	Ludivine Aubourg	Stop - Sam Brown				

==== Episode 2: March 3, 2012 ====
Order	Contestant	Song	Coaches' and Contestants' Choices			
Order	Contestant	Song	Florent	Jenifer	Louis	Garou
1	Veronick Sevère	Allumer le feu - Johnny Hallyday		—		
2	Vigon	I Got You (I Feel Good) - James Brown	—	—		—
3	Ophélie Tosoni	Homme sweet homme - Zazie	—	—	—	—
4	Stéphanie Bédard	Heavy Cross - Gossip			—	
5	Jua Amir	Someone Like You - Adele		—	—	—
6	Karima Diamane	Pour que tu m'aimes encore - Céline Dion	—	—	—	—
7	Sonia Lacen	Total Eclipse of the Heart - Bonnie Tyler				
8	Florian Veneziano	Wonderwall - Oasis	—		—	—
9	Laura Llorens	Ça (c'est vraiment toi) - Téléphone	—	—	—	—
10	Cécile Citadelle	Rehab - Amy Winehouse	—			
11	Emma Durand	Dis, quand reviendras-tu ? - Barbara	—	—	—	
12	Stéphan Rizon	Rolling in the Deep - Adele		—	—	—
13	Atef	Ben - Michael Jackson				
14	Arnaud Delsaux	L'Assasymphonie - Mozart, l'opéra rock	—	—	—	—
15	Dalila	Amoureuse - Véronique Sanson		—		—
16	Pia Salvia	Toxic - Britney Spears	—			—

==== Episode 3: March 10, 2012 ====
Order	Contestant	Song	Coaches' and Contestants' Choices			
Order	Contestant	Song	Florent	Jenifer	Louis	Garou
1	Lise Darly	The Edge of Glory - Lady Gaga		—		—
2	Valérie Delgado	Calling You - Jevetta Steele (Bagdad Café)				—
3	Sacha Tran	Dis-moi - BB Brunes	—		—	—
4	Maureen Doucet	Mon Dieu - Édith Piaf	—	—	—	—
5	Amalya Delepierre	Set Fire to the Rain - Adele				
6	Arthur Bing	Toi et moi - Guillaume Grand	—	—	—	—
7	Estelle Micheau	Caruso - Lucio Dalla		—	—	
8	Stéphanie	Donne-moi le temps - Jenifer		—	—	—
9	Carine Robert	Call Me - Blondie	—	—	—	—
10	Jhony Maalhouf	You Raise Me Up - Josh Groban		—		
11	Jessica Plesel	L'envie - Johnny Hallyday	—	—	—	
12	Rubby	Empire State of Mind - Jay-Z feat. Alicia Keys	—	—		—
13	Akim Ghardane	La Bohème - Charles Aznavour	—	—	—	—
14	Christophe Berthier	Crazy - Gnarls Barkley	—	—		—
15	Sofia Mountassir	Hurt - Christina Aguilera		—	—	
16	Maureen Angot	Maniac - Michael Sembello	—			—

==== Episode 4: March 17, 2012 ====
Order	Contestant	Song	Coaches' and Contestants' Choices			
Order	Contestant	Song	Florent	Jenifer	Louis	Garou
1	Élodie Balestra	All by Myself - Eric Carmen, as performed by Céline Dion				
2	Mister John Lewis	Man In The Mirror - Michael Jackson	—	—		
3	Audrey	Emmenez-Moi - Charles Aznavour	—	—	—	—
4	Bruce Johnson	You're the First, the Last, My Everything - Barry White		—	—	
5	Aude Henneville	I'll Stand By You - The Pretenders	—	—		—
6	Yohann	L'envie d'aimer - Daniel Lévi	—	—	—	—
7	Julia Cinna	Tainted Love - Soft Cell	—			
8	Hailé	Jealous Guy - John Lennon	—		—	—
9	Laetitia	L'Aigle Noir - Barbara	—	—	—	—
10	Kristel Adams	Forget You - Cee-Lo Green				
11	Alban Bartoli	La quête - Jacques Brel		—	—	—N/a
12	Ange Fandoh	When Love Takes Over - David Guetta feat. Kelly Rowland	—N/a		—	—N/a
13	Brenda Cardullo	Je l'aime à mourir (Lo Quiero A Morir) - Francis Cabrel, as performed by Shakira	—N/a	—		—N/a
14	Damien Pisano	Footloose - Kenny Loggins	—N/a	—	--	—N/a
15	K.	I Have Nothing - Whitney Houston	—N/a		—	—N/a
16	Louise	New Soul - Yaël Naïm	—N/a	—N/a		—N/a
17	Linda	You Know I'm No Good - Amy Winehouse				—N/a

=== Step 2 : « Battles Musicales » (Musical Battles) ===
The Blind Auditions were taped on 14 and 16 February 2012 at the studio Lendit, in La Plaine Saint-Denis, near Paris. Coaches begin narrowing down the playing field by training the contestants with the help of "trusted advisors". Each episode featured four battles consisting of pairings from within each team, and each battle concluding with the respective coach eliminating one of the two contestants; the four winners for each coach advanced to the live shows.

The trusted advisors for these episodes are: Jacques Veneruso working with Garou, Sandra Derlon working with Jenifer, John Mamann working with Florent Pagny and Maurice Suissa working with Louis Bertignac.

==== Episode 5: March 24, 2012 ====
Order	Coach	Winner	Loser(s)	Song
1	Florent Pagny	Dominique Magloire	Véronick Sévère	The Best - Bonnie Tyler, as performed by Tina Turner
2	Garou	Atef	Sofia Mountassir	Lettre à France - Michel Polnareff
3	Jenifer	Al. Hy	Julia Cinna	J'ai vu - Niagara
4	Louis Bertignac	Aude Henneville	Mister John Lewis	Purple Rain - Prince
5	Garou	Blandine Aggery	Ludivine Aubourg	Firework - Katy Perry
6	Louis Bertignac	Philippe Tailleferd	Brenda Cardullo	Hymne à l'amour - Edith Piaf
7	Jenifer	Amalya Delepierre	Ange Fandoh	Survivor - Destiny's Child
8	Florent Pagny	Lise Darly	Dalila	Total Eclipse of the Heart - Bonnie Tyler
9	Garou	Stéphanie Bédard	Bruce Johnson; Jessica Plesel	Crazy - Gnarls Barkley
10	Florent Pagny	Alban Bartoli	Greg Ingrao	L'envie d'aimer - Daniel Lévi
11	Louis Bertignac	Vigon	Christophe Berthier	Respect - Aretha Franklin
12	Jenifer	Sacha Tran	Florian Veneziano	Machistador - M

==== Episode 6: March 31, 2012 ====
Order	Coach	Winner	Loser(s)	Song
1	Florent Pagny	Valérie Delgado	Estelle Micheau	I Will Always Love You - Whitney Houston
2	Garou	Flo Malley	Kristel Adams	Éteins la lumière - Axel Bauer
3	Jenifer	Sonia Lacen	Lina Lamara	I'll be there - Jackson Five
4	Louis Bertignac	Louise	Cécile Citadelle	Tandem - Vanessa Paradis
5	Florent Pagny	Stéphan Rizon	Jua Amir	Kiss - Prince
6	Garou	Jhony Maalhouf	Emma Durand	Monopolis - Starmania
7	Jenifer	Thomas Mignot	K.	Superstition - Stevie Wonder
8	Louis Bertignac	Pia Salvia	Patrice Carmona	Angie - Rolling Stones
9	Florent Pagny	Stéphanie Lamia	Élodie Balestra; Linda	Pour que tu m'aimes encore - Céline Dion
10	Louis Bertignac	Rubby	Julien & Pauline Thisse	Pas besoin de toi - Joyce Jonathan
11	Garou	Louis Delort	Damien Schmitt	One - U2
12	Jenifer	Maureen Angot	Hailé	Si la vie demande ça - Native

=== Step 3 : « Primes » (Live Shows) ===
Public voting across phone commenced at this point, with one candidate eliminated from each team in the first two live shows. Voting lines were opened during the broadcast of each live show on Saturday.

The first half of each team performed in the first Live Show, the second half in the second Live Show.

==== Episode 7: April 7, 2012 ====
Competition Performances

Order	Coach	Contestant	Song	Result
1	Garou	Louis Delort	Trouble - Coldplay	Saved by his coach
2	Garou	Stéphanie Bédard	C'est comme ça - Les Rita Mitsouko	Eliminated
3	Garou	Jhony Maalouf	Memory - Barbra Streisand	Saved by the public
4	Florent Pagny	Lise Darly	No Stress - Laurent Wolf	Saved by her coach
5	Florent Pagny	Dominique Magloire	Immortelle - Lara Fabian	Saved by the public
6	Florent Pagny	Alban Bartoli	Supreme - Robbie Williams	Eliminated
7	Louis Bertignac	Philippe Tailleferd	Stayin' Alive - Bee Gees	Eliminated
8	Louis Bertignac	Rubby	Soul Man - Ben l'Oncle Soul	Saved by the public
9	Louis Bertignac	Louise	La Vie En Rose - Edith Piaf	Saved by her coach
10	Jenifer	Sonia Lacen	Beautiful - Christina Aguilera	Saved by her coach
11	Jenifer	Sacha Tran	Divinidylle - Vanessa Paradis	Eliminated
12	Jenifer	Amalya Delepierre	I Just Can't Stop Loving You - Michael Jackson	Saved by the public

Non-competition performances

Order	Performers	Song
1	The Voice Coaches; Garou, Louis Bertignac, Florent Pagny, Jenifer	Le Blues du businessman - Starmania
2	Garou and his team (Stéphanie Bédard, Jhony Maalouf, Louis Delort)	Si l'on s'aimait, si - Les Enfoirés (I Was Made For Lovin' You - Kiss)
3	Florent and his team (Lise Darly, Alban Bartoli, Dominique Magloire)	Medley of La Javanaise, Jolie Môme, Le Jazz et la Java and Vesoul
4	Louis and his team (Philippe Tailleferd, Rubby, Louise)	I Love Rock 'n' Roll - Joan Jett
5	Jenifer and her team (Sonia Lacen, Amalya Delepierre, Sacha Tran)	Are You Gonna Go My Way - Lenny Kravitz

==== Episode 8: April 14, 2012 ====
Competition Performances

Order	Coach	Contestant	Song	Result
1	Garou	Blandine Aggery	The Winner Takes It All - ABBA	Saved by her coach
2	Garou	Flo Malley	Price Tag - Jessie J	Eliminated
3	Garou	Atef	Comme toi - Jean-Jacques Goldman	Saved by the public
4	Florent Pagny	Stéphanie	I'm So Excited - The Pointer Sisters	Saved by her coach
5	Florent Pagny	Stéphan Rizon	Over The Rainbow - Judy Garland	Saved by the public
6	Florent Pagny	Valérie Delgado	We Found Love / Only Girl (In the World) - Rihanna	Eliminated
7	Louis Bertignac	Aude Henneville	Toi Et Moi - Guillaume Grand	Saved by her coach
8	Louis Bertignac	Vigon	Unchain My Heart - Joe Cocker / Ray Charles	Saved by the public
9	Louis Bertignac	Pia Salvia	I Don't Know - Noa	Eliminated
10	Jenifer	Thomas Mignot	Without You - David Guetta feat. Usher	Saved by his coach
11	Jenifer	Maureen Angot	Né quelque part - Maxime Le Forestier	Eliminated
12	Jenifer	Al.Hy	Feeling Good - Nina Simone as performed by Muse	Saved by the public

Non-competition performances

Order	Performers	Song
1	The Voice Contestants; All the 12 contestants of the Live Show	Ma révolution - Jenifer, Un autre monde - Téléphone; Si tu veux m'essayer - Florent Pagny, Je n'attendais que vous - Garou
2	Garou and his team (Stéphanie Bédard, Jhony Maalouf, Louis Delort)	With Or Without You - U2
3	Florent and his team (Lise Darly, Alban Bartoli, Dominique Magloire)	Je veux - Zaz
4	Louis and his team (Philippe Tailleferd, Rubby, Louise)	Cendrillon - Téléphone
5	Jenifer and her team (Sonia Lacen, Amalya Delepierre, Sacha Tran)	Rue De La Paix - Zazie

==== Episode 9: April 21, 2012 ====
Competition Performances

Order	Coach	Contestant	Song	Result
1	Florent Pagny	Lise Darly	Someone Like You - Adele	Eliminated
2	Florent Pagny	Stéphan Rizon	Le Pénitencier - Johnny Hallyday	Saved by the public
3	Florent Pagny	Dominique Magloire	Last Dance - Donna Summer	Saved by her coach
4	Florent Pagny	Stéphanie	Comme d'habitude - Claude François	Saved by her coach
5	Jenifer	Sonia Lacen	Russian Roulette - Rihanna	Eliminated
6	Jenifer	Amalya	Le monde est stone - France Gall	Saved by her coach
7	Jenifer	Thomas Mignot	Comme un boomerang - Serge Gainsbourg	Saved by his coach
8	Jenifer	Al.Hy	La Foule - Edith Piaf	Saved by the public
9	Louis Bertignac	Rubby	If I Were A Boy - Beyoncé Knowles	Saved by the public
10	Louis Bertignac	Vigon	Soul Man - The Blues Brothers	Eliminated
11	Louis Bertignac	Louise	Call Me - Blondie	Saved by her coach
12	Louis Bertignac	Aude Henneville	Roxanne - The Police	Saved by her coach
13	Garou	Louis Delort	Amsterdam - Jacques Brel	Saved by the public
14	Garou	Atef	Hallelujah - Jeff Buckley	Saved by his coach
15	Garou	Blandine Aggery	Si seulement je pouvais lui manquer - Calogero	Eliminated
16	Garou	Jhony Maalouf	Bohemian Rhapsody - Queen	Saved by his coach

Non-competition performances

Order	Performers	Song
1	The Voice Coaches (Jenifer, Louis Bertignac, Florent Pagny, Garou)	Beatles' Medley: All You Need Is Love, A Hard Day's Night, Help! & Twist And Shout

==== Episode 10: April 28, 2012 ====
Competition Performances

Order	Coach	Contestant	Song	Result
1	Florent Pagny	Stéphan Rizon	New York, New York - Frank Sinatra	Saved by his coach
2	Florent Pagny	Dominique Magloire	GoldenEye - Tina Turner	Saved by the public
3	Florent Pagny	Stéphanie	Si j'étais un homme - Diane Tell	Eliminated
4	Jenifer	Amalya	I Say A Little Prayer - Aretha Franklin	Saved by her coach
5	Jenifer	Thomas Mignot	Ne me quitte pas - Jacques Brel	Eliminated
6	Jenifer	Al.Hy	Wuthering Heights - Kate Bush	Saved by the public
7	Louis Bertignac	Louise	Alter Ego - Jean-Louis Aubert	Eliminated
8	Louis Bertignac	Rubby	Telephone - Lady Gaga & Beyoncé	Saved by the public
9	Louis Bertignac	Aude Henneville	L'homme heureux - William Sheller	Saved by her coach
10	Garou	Atef	Highway To Hell - AC/DC	Saved by his coach
11	Garou	Jhony Maalouf	Diego - Michel Berger	Eliminated
12	Garou	Louis Delort	Creep - Radiohead	Saved by the public

Non-competition performances

Order	Performers	Song
1	The Voice Contestants; All the 12 contestants of the Live Show	Des Ricochets - Collectif Paris Africa
3	Florent's team (Stephan Rizon, Dominique Magloire, Stéphanie)	Laissons entrer le Soleil (Let The Sunshine In) - Hair
5	Jenifer's team (Amalya, Thomas Mignot, Al.Hy)	Proud Mary - Tina Turner
4	Louis' team (Aude Henneville, Rubby, Louise)	Video Games - Lana Del Rey
2	Garou's team (Atef, Jhony Maalouf, Louis Delort)	Belle - Notre Dame de Paris

==== Episode 11: May 5, 2012 ====
Competition Performances (Semi-finals)

Order	Coach	Contestant	Song	Public's ratings /100	Coach's rating /50	Total /150	Result
1	Jenifer	Amalya Delepierre	Sweet Dreams (Are Made of This) - Eurythmics	29,8	20	49,8	Eliminated
2	Jenifer	Al.Hy	Göttingen - Barbara	70,2	30	100,2	Saved by the public and her coach
3	Florent Pagny	Dominique Magloire	Et maintenant - Gilbert Bécaud	29,5	24	53,5	Eliminated
4	Florent Pagny	Stéphan Rizon	With a Little Help from My Friends - The Beatles	70,5	26	96,5	Saved by the public and his coach
5	Louis Bertignac	Aude Henneville	Crazy - Seal	49,9	30	79,9	Saved by the public and her coach
6	Louis Bertignac	Rubby	Pas toi - Jean-Jacques Goldman	50,1	20	70,1	Eliminated
7	Garou	Atef	Mon fils ma bataille - Daniel Balavoine	29,5	15	44,5	Eliminated
8	Garou	Louis Delort	Unchained Melody - The Righteous Brothers	70,5	35	105,5	Saved by the public and his coach

Non-competition performances

Order	Performers	Song
1	The Voice coaches (Garou, Louis Bertignac, Florent Pagny, Jenifer)	What'd I Say - Ray Charles
2	Jenifer's team (Amalya Delepierre et Al.Hy)	Heavy Cross - Gossip
3	Jenifer and her team (Jenifer, Amalya Delepierre et Al.Hy)	(I Can't Get No) Satisfaction - The Rolling Stones
4	Florent Pagny's team (Stéphan Rizon, Dominique Magloire)	J'oublierai ton nom - Johnny Hallyday
5	Florent and his team (Florent Pagny, Stéphan Rizon et Dominique Magloire)	Chanter - Florent Pagny
6	Louis' team (Rubby et Aude Hennevile)	I Kissed a Girl - Katy Perry
7	Louis and his team (Louis Bertignac, Rubby et Aude Hennevile)	These Boots Are Made for Walkin' - Nancy Sinatra
8	Garou's team (Louis Delort et Atef)	Say Say Say - Paul McCartney & Michael Jackson
9	Garou and his team (Garou, Louis Delort et Atef)	We Don't Need Another Hero - Tina Turner

==== Episode 12: Towards the final: May 11, 2012 ====
The 12th episode broadcast live at 22h30 on May 11, 2012, included the 4 finalists, namely Louis Delort of Team Garou, Al.Hy of Team Jennifer, Stéphan Rizon of Team Stéphan Rizon and Aude Henneville of Team Louis Bertignac perform their audition songs again in preparation for the final, after the 8 tour finalists performed collectively. Will Smith was the special guest for the episode.

Performances during the special episode

Order	Singers	Song
1	Les 8 Talents of The Voice Tour; Amalya Delepierre and Al.Hy; Stéphan Rizon and Dominique Magloire; Rubby and Aude Henneville; Louis Delort and Atef	"C'est bientôt la fin" - Mozart, l'opéra rock
2	Al.Hy	"What's Up" - 4 Non Blondes
3	Stéphan Rizon	"Rolling in the Deep" - Adele
4	Aude Henneville	"I'll Stand by You" - The Pretenders
5	Louis Delort	"Video Games" - Lana Del Rey

==== Episodes 13 - Final - May 12, 2012 ====
13th episode was the final broadcast on 12 May 2012 live starting 20h50. In addition to the finalist, special guests performed collaborations including Johnny Hallyday, Véronique Sanson, Lenny Kravitz and Yannick Noah.

Team of each coach was represented by the remaining finalist from the team. It was announced that the winner would get a recording contract with Universal Music France as well as a cash prize of €150,000 .

The 4 finalists were:

Coaches
Garou	Jenifer	Florent Pagny	Louis Bertignac
Louis Delort	Al.Hy	Stéphan Rizon	Aude Henneville

Performances by finalists
Stéphan Rizon

Order	Coach	Song title	Performer	Result
1	Florent Pagny	"Think" - Aretha Franklin	Stéphan Rizon (solo)	Winner - (31.5%)
5	Florent Pagny	"Requiem pour un fou" - Johnny Hallyday	Stéphan Rizon duo with Johnny Halliday	Winner - (31.5%)
10	Florent Pagny	"Caruso" - Lucio Dalla	Stéphan Rizon (solo)	Winner - (31.5%)
15	Florent Pagny	"You Raise Me Up" - Josh Groban	Stéphan Rizon duo with Florent Pagny	Winner - (31.5%)

Aude Henneville

Order	Coach	Song title	Performer	Result
2	Louis Bertignac	"Je t'aimais, je t'aime, je t'aimerai" - Francis Cabrel	Aude Henneville (solo)	Fourth - (14.5%)
8	Louis Bertignac	"Amoureuse" - Véronique Sanson	Aude Henneville duo with Véronique Sanson	Fourth - (14.5%)
11	Louis Bertignac	"Somewhere Only We Know" - Keane	Aude Henneville (solo)	Fourth - (14.5%)
14	Louis Bertignac	"Ces idées-là" - Louis Bertignac	Aude Henneville duo with Louis Bertignac	Fourth - (14.5%)

Louis Delort

Order	Coach	Song title	Performer	Result
3	Garou	"Somebody That I Used to Know - Gotye	Louis Delort (solo)	Runner-up - (29.9%)
6	Garou	"Redemption Song - Bob Marley	Louis Delort duo with Yannick Noah	Runner-up - (29.9%)
12	Garou	"Avec le temps" - Léo Ferré	Louis Delort (solo)	Runner-up - (29.9%)
13	Garou	"Lonely Boy" - The Black Keys	Louis Delort duo with Garou	Runner-up - (29.9%)

Al.Hy

Order	Coach	Song title	Performer	Result
4	Jenifer	"Quand j'serai K.O" - Alain Souchon	Al.Hy (solo)	Third - (24.1%)
7	Jenifer	"Are You Gonna Go My Way" - Lenny Kravitz	Al.Hy duo with Lenny Kravitz	Third - (24.1%)
12	Jenifer	"Bitter Sweet Symphony" - The Verve	Al.Hy (solo)	Third - (24.1%)
13	Jenifer	"Under the Bridge" - Red Hot Chili Peppers	Al.Hy duo with Jenifer	Third - (24.1%)

== Ratings ==
Season	Number of episodes	Timeslot	Broadcast period		Viewers		
Season	Number of episodes	Timeslot	First Episode	Last Episode	First Episode	Final	Average
1	12	Saturday, 8h50 PM	February 25, 2012	May 12, 2012	9 124 000 (37,9 %)	7 567 000 (34,4 %)	7 659 500 (33,6 %)

== See also ==
- The Voice: la plus belle voix
- The Voice (TV series)
