= Verlo =

French singer-songwriter

- Born: Pauline Louise Benattar; 14 December 1988 (age 37); Ariège, France
- Occupation: Singer-songwriter
- Years active: 2013–present
- Label: Mercury

Pauline Louise Benattar (French pronunciation: [pɔlin lwiz bɛnataʁ]; born 14 December 1988), known professionally as Verlo (formerly Louise Verneuil), is a French singer-songwriter.

== Biography ==
Benattar was born in the department of Alsace, Haut-Rhin. She has one sister. Her father, a pharmacist, enjoyed English-speaking artists, including Elvis Presley, Johnny Cash, Bob Dylan, The Beatles and David Bowie, and taught Benattar how to play guitar. Her Catalan mother, who died in 2018, listened to Marie Laforêt, Barbara, Jean Ferrat, Serge Reggiani, Serge Gainsbourg, and Véronique Sanson.

Benattar's family moved to La Bastide-sur-l'Hers, Ariège when she was 18 months old, and owned a pharmacy there. They moved to Golfe-Juan when she was ten and she was educated at Lycée du Mont Saint-Jean (1998-2002) in nearby Antibes.

After studying journalism at university, Benattar spent time in Punta Cana, Dominican Republic before working in Paris as a publicist for a contemporary art gallery.

She has been in a relationship with the musician Alex Turner since 2018.

== Music career ==
After moving to Paris at the age of 22, Benattar chose her former stage name by using the name of her mother, grandmother and great-grandmother (Louise) and the street where Gainsbourg and Jane Birkin lived (Rue de Verneuil).

In 2012, when Benattar was 23, she was a contestant on France's The Voice. She had never sung in front of an audience before and described Gainsbourg and Alain Bashung as her main influences. Her Voice mentor was Louis Bertignac, guitarist for the rock band Téléphone. Following her elimination in the quarter-finals, she recorded an album with Bertignac but did not release it.

In 2013, she worked as a backstage reporter for The Voice. Benattar then began performing live and co-wrote a song for Isabelle Boulay. She released a self-titled EP in June 2019 produced by Samy Osta. In April 2020, she released her debut album Lumiere Noire also produced by Samy Osta. It features the songs from her EP and other songs including "Love Corail", "Emerencia", "Fugitif", "Lumiere Noire", "A mort amant" and "L'evadée belle". As of June 2022 she has recorded and mixed a new album and is no longer signed to Mercury Records.

In November 2025, Benattar announced her new stage name Verlo. Her EP Générique was released through State51 on the 28 of November 2025. The EP was recorded at La Frette studios and produced by James Ford, Loren Humphrey and Alex Turner.
