= Public Telephone (film) =

1980 film

- Film poster
- Directed by: Jean-Marie Périer
- Produced by: Maurice Bernart; Claudie Ossard
- Starring: Jean-Louis Aubert; Louis Bertignac; Félix Bussy
- Cinematography: Lionel Legros; Alain Masseron
- Edited by: Thierry Derocles
- Music by: Téléphone
- Distributed by: Gaumont Distribution
- Release date: 11 June 1980
- Running time: 100 minutes
- Country: France
- Language: French

Public Telephone (French: Téléphone public) is a 1980 French documentary film directed by Jean-Marie Périer. It was screened out of competition at the 1980 Cannes Film Festival.

== Cast ==
- Jean-Louis Aubert
- Louis Bertignac
- Félix Bussy
- Dominique Forestier
- Richard Kolinka
- Jean-Yves Lovaille
- Corine Marienneau
- François Ravard
