= Frank Vroegop =

Dutch director (born 1960)

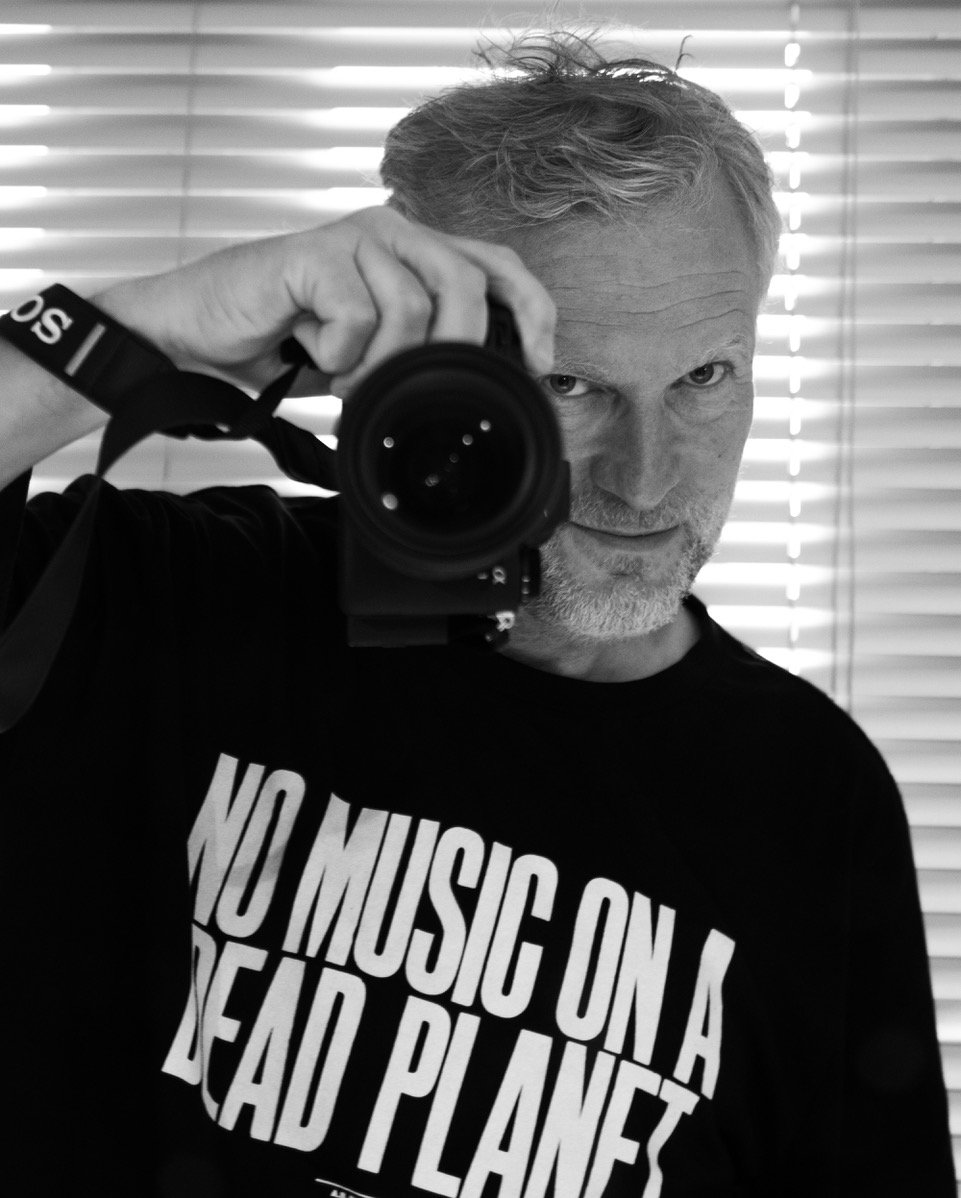
- Vroegop in 2022
- Born: June 19, 1960 (age 66); Terneuzen, Netherlands
- Occupation: Director
- Years active: 1985–present

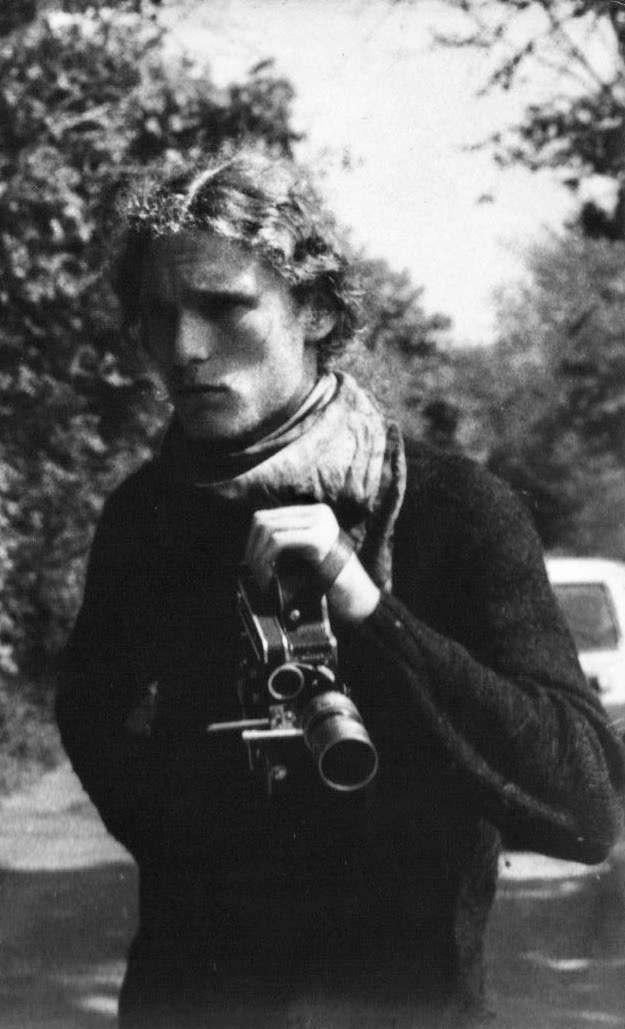
Vroegop in 1981

Frank Vroegop is a Dutch multimedia artist, filmmaker, music composer & producer and contemporary artist born on 19 June 1960 in Terneuzen, Zeeland in the Netherlands. Frank Vroegop is also producing music and video-art under the pseudonyms EUROPIUM and VAVOX and producing paintings under the name VROEGOP/SEQUENCES.

== Early life ==
Vroegop left the Netherlands for France when he was 12. After high-school at the Lyceum International in Paris, he started studying architecture at the Beaux Arts in Paris. During his studies, he worked as an educator with children (recreation centre & handicapped centre). He gave up his studies and began creating videos with home computers (Amiga, Apple), Super 8 cameras, and making animated films and experimental music videos to illustrate his own musical creations. In 1984, Vroegop studied contemporary music at the IRCAM / Paris.

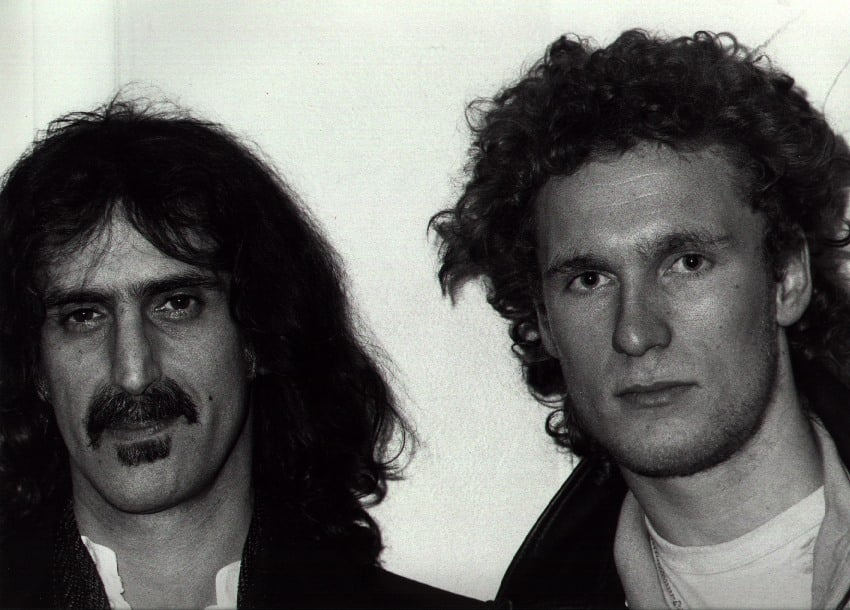
Vroegop & Frank Zappa Ircam -January 9th 1984

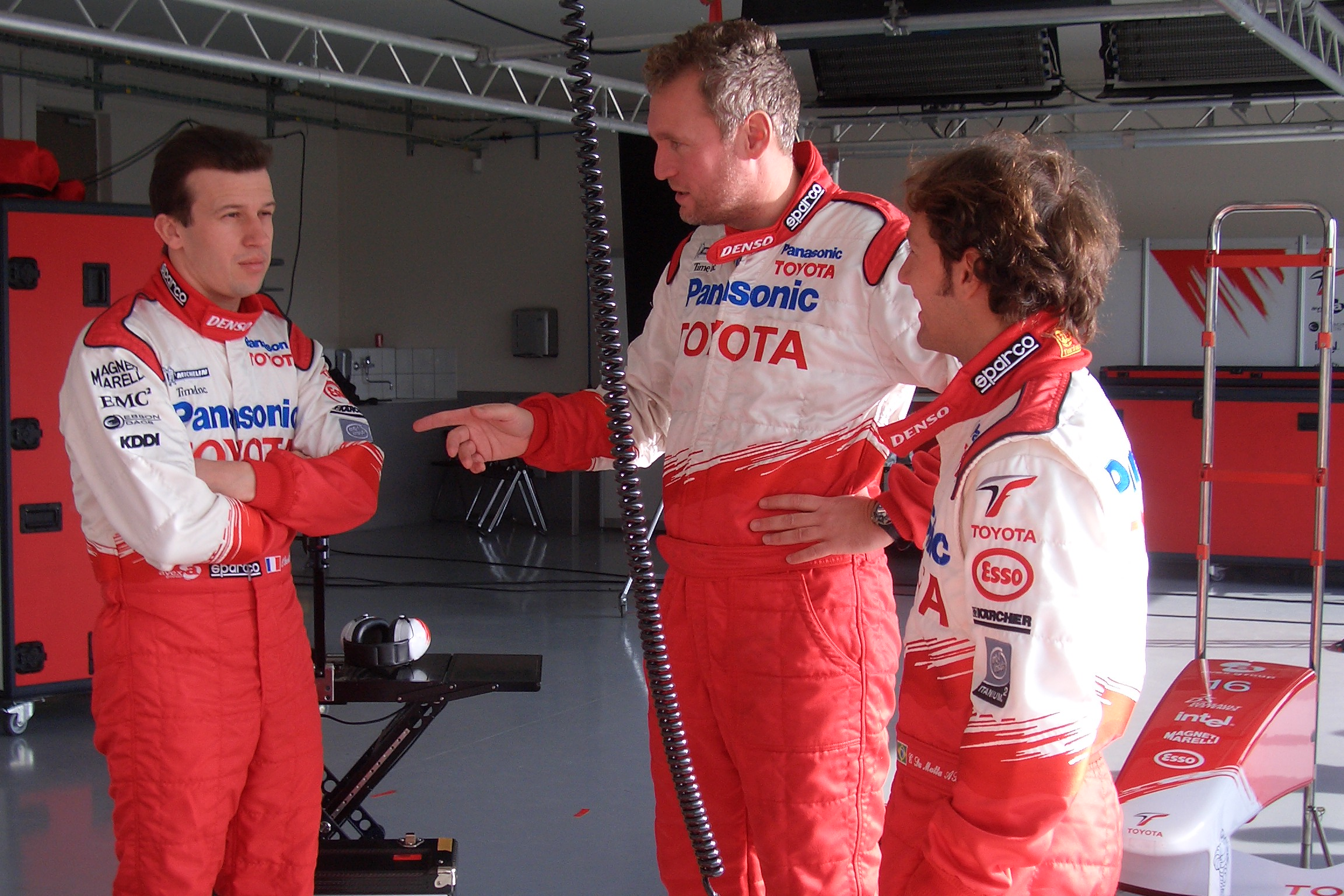
Vroegop, Oliver Panis, & Cristiano da Matte as part of the Toyota Formula 1 Team

== Film director ==
Since 1996, Vroegop has directed over 300 commercials worldwide, mostly with spectacular special effects for brands such as Ford, Volkswagen, Audi, Lexus, Toyota, Toyota F1, Porsche, Nissan, Infiniti, Citroen, Dodge, General Motors, Cadillac, Opel, Mercedes, Peugeot, Tata, Mahindra, Gazprom, Budweiser, Pepsi, Coca-Cola, Mountain Dew, Tropicana, Panasonic, Timex, Danone, several beer brands, etc. He also filmed a large number of celebrities for the L'Oréal brand, including: Beyoncé Knowless, Claudia Schiffer, Milla Jovovich, Natalia Vodianova, Virginie Ledoyen, etc. and also worked with several international stars: Hong Kong actor Daniel Wu, Bollywood star Katrina Kaif, Vietnamese singer Tóc Tiên, etc. He made all the films for the launch of the brand L'Oréal - Men Expert. He has also worked extensively with athletes: international football players for Pepsi and Danone, international rugby players, Formula 1 drivers, paratroopers, etc., Vroegop has won numerous awards at festivals around the world including Lion d'Or, Bronze Lion in Cannes, Epica Awards, Golden Drum Awards Portoros and more. Vroegop also supports several non-governmental organisations. He has directed films for La Maison des Femmes, les Unsdifferents (a musical group made up of people with autism and Down syndrome), Reporters Without Borders, Nicolas Hulot Foundation and Nobody's Children Foundation.

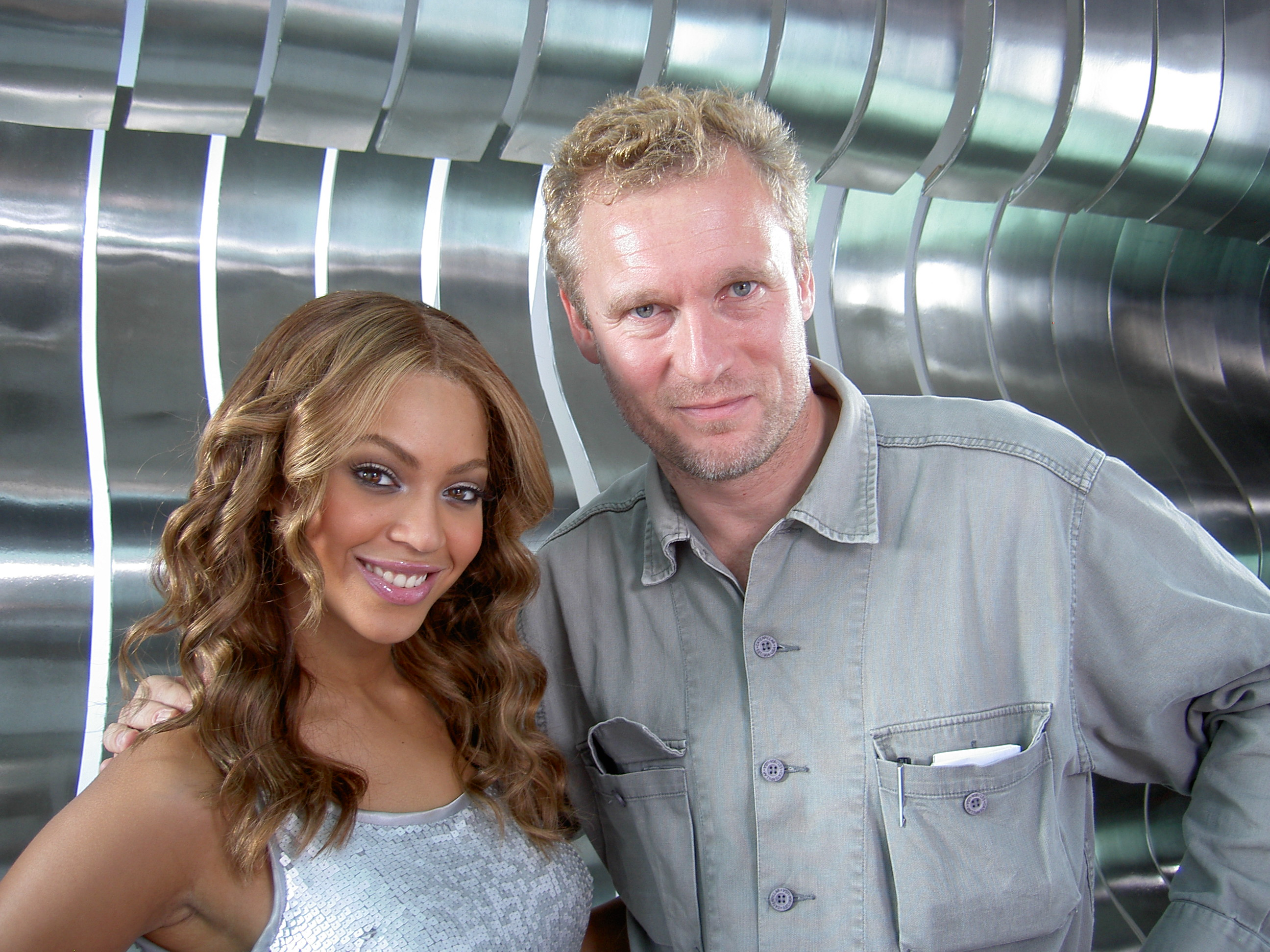
Vroegop & Beyonce

== Music videos ==
From the 1980s, Vroegop directed more than 50 music videos, mainly for French artists: Jean-Louis Aubert, Louis Bertignac, Dani, Gérald de Palmas, Affaire Louis Trio, Patrick Bruel, Zebda, Clarika, Massilia Sound System, Ludwig Von 88, Burma Shave, Elton John, Tarkan, etc. These music videos are often grounds for technical experiments. Vroegop uses all types of cameras, formats and emulsions: from Super 8 to 65mm film cameras, high-speed cameras, endoscopic cameras, digital cameras prototypes, motion controlled cameras, etc. Many creations combine real filming with frame-by-frame animation : traditional animations with paper, clay, paint & volumes and computer animation, computer graphics & digital post-production visual effects.

== Video stage design ==
With Europium Films, Vroegop has directed several music videos for Jean-Louis Aubert. He created the video stage design for Jean-Louis Aubert's 'Roc Éclair Tour 2011- 2012' for Roc éclair album. There were 80 dates/450 000 spectators in total for that tour which was given a Victoire de la Musique award in 2012. A DVD and CD have been released from the recorded concert at the Paris-Bercy Palais Omnisport, for which Vroegop also made the graphic designs and photography works.

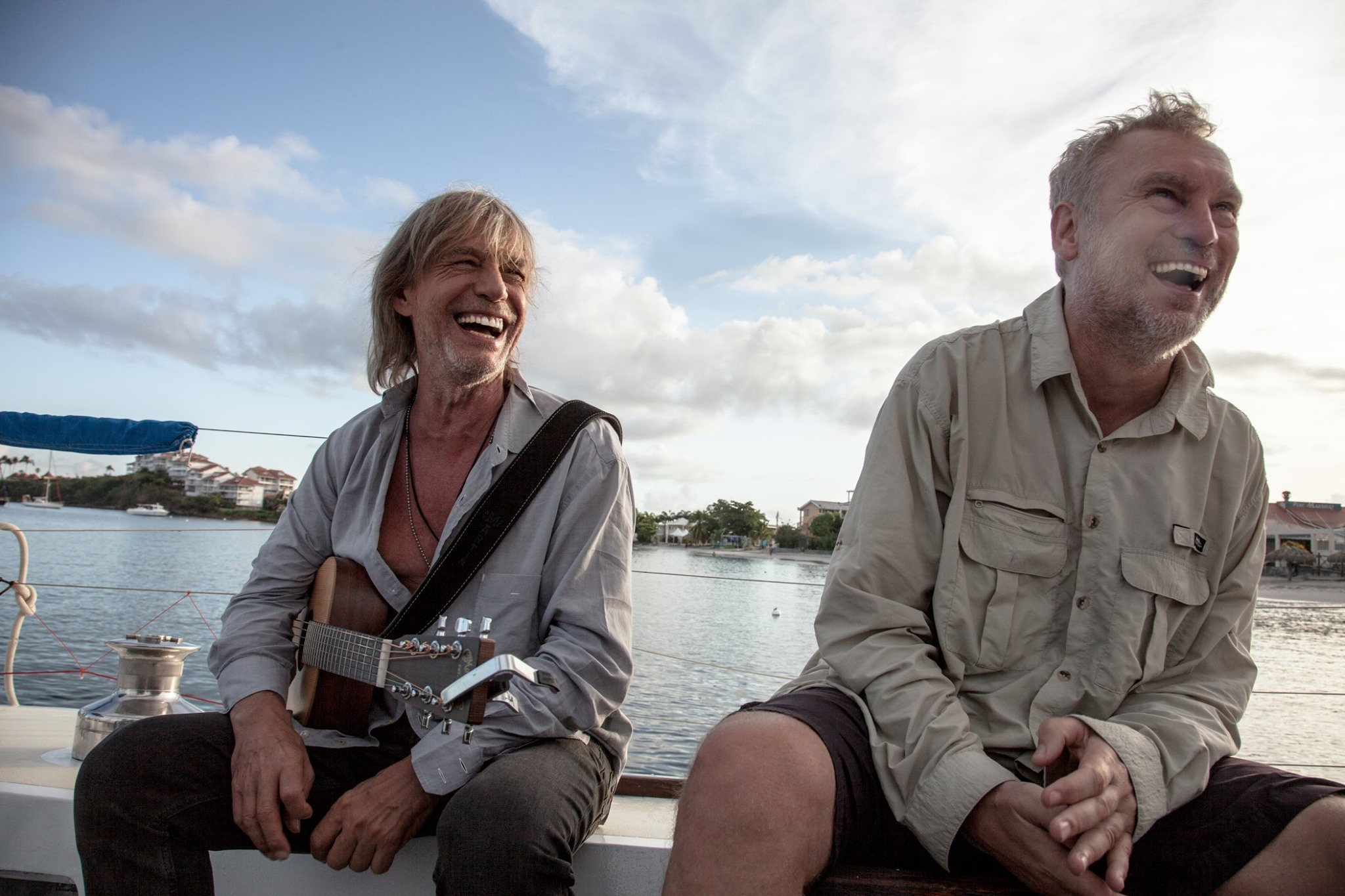
Vroegop & Jean Louis Aunert

== The Vavox Project ==
Vroegop is the founder of the Vavox Project. He has produced all the Vavox artwork : music, videos, photos, paintings & design. Vroegop and Marco Rosano also composed and produced the Vavox Stabat Mater, an original contemporary version of the Stabat Mater with counter-tenor singer Andreas Scholl. The Vavox - Stabat Mater mixes a 13th-century Latin text, a counter-tenor voice, percussion and analogue & modular synthesizers. In October 2015, as part of the Amsterdam Dance Event, the Vavox - Stabat Mater was performed live in the Westerkerk, the largest church in Amsterdam.

Vroegop composed and produced the great majority of the music of his commercials with composer Marco Rosano. He shares with Marco Rosano a vintage analogue recording studio and a large collection of analogue synthesizers and keyboards: Moog, Arp, Oberheim, Roland, Mellotron, Hammond, Rhodes, Chroma, Höhner, Eurorack, etc. Apart from the soundtracks (about 75% of the music of its commercials), the Vintage Studio also produced the compositions of Marco Rosano with the counter-tenor Andreas Scholl as well as the band Pop Machine.

== The EUROPIUM.ART project ==
In 2026, Frank Vroegop launched the EUROPIUM.ART project. EUROPIUM.ART is a musical, video, and visual art project. The first release, published in June 2026, features 12 songs: nine versions of "Au Pays des merveilles de Juliet" (a 1973 song by Yves Simon), "Dear Prudence" (a Beatles cover produced using analog modular synthesizers), and two original songs. The songs are illustrated by experimental music videos. All songs are performed by English singer Katty Heath and mixed by Dominique Blanc-Francard at the LABOMATIC Studio in Paris and Trouville.

== Painting ==
His painting works has been the subject of several exhibitions. His 'Feral Painting' style is freely inspired by the Cobra movement and American action painting. He developed in his paintings the "feral" concept, which represents notion of going back to the wild, to a natural instinct, after being domesticated and then leaving the civilized world.

He collaborated with filmmaker & painter Tony Kaye on several music videos and on the documentary ‘Saigon Compromise’.

In 2022, Vroegop directed a documentary about the French painter Jacques Clauzel. Since 2022, Vroegop is creating art work with Super 8, 16mm, 35mm, 70mm & Imax films.

== VROEGOP/SEQUENCES ==
From 2022, Frank Vroegop’s *Sequences* are collages on canvas or paper made from strips of film—whether photographic or cinematic, positive or negative, and in various formats—that are variously legible, damaged, erased, scratched, and so on. These film strips—ranging from 35mm (still photography) and Super 8 to 9.5mm, 16mm, 35mm, 70mm, and IMAX—may bear signs of erasure, overlay, alteration, wear, chemical dissolution, burning, or partial loss. The arrangement of these film strips on the support often creates a rhythm, a motif, a pattern, a score, a graphic structure, or a semblance of order.

The pictorial work of Frank Vroegop is represented by the GAGG art gallery in [Gallargues-le-Montueux] and Galerie Menouar à Paris.

== EUROPIUM FILMS & Delapost Paris ==
In 1997, Vroegop created his own production house EUROPIUM FILMS and in 2008, he created the production, animation & post-production company Delapost Paris. Since 2020, he is not involved in Delapost Paris anymore.

== Awards ==
Commercials

- Cannes Lion 2000 Golden - "Le plaisir" for Manix
- London International Advertising Awards - "Le plaisir" for Manix
- Cresta Awards - "Le plaisir" for Manix
- Effie France Award - "Le plaisir" for Manix
- Grand Prix Stratégies - "Le plaisir" for Manix
- MENA Crystal award - "Cog City/Clockwork" for Sagia
- Dubai Lynx Bronze award - "Cog City/Clockwork" for Sagia
- Cannes Lion 2008 Bronze -"Execution" for Nobody's Children Foundation
- Golden Drum 2007 -"Execution" for Nobody's Children Foundation
- Actdove 2008 -"Execution" for Nobody's Children Foundation
- EACA Care Awards 2008 The Winners Non-profit Organisations and Non-governmental Bodies Award -"Execution" for Nobody's Children Foundation
- Epica Silver Awards 2007 -"Execution" for Nobody's Children Foundation
- London "Let's All Be Free Film Festival" 2013 – Winner Expressions-Award for "Feral Painter"
- Victiore de la Musique - "Jean-Louis Aubert - Roc’Eclair Tour"
- Festival PROTOCLIP 2011 -PRIX DE LA QUALITE TECHNIQUE 2011 / Jean-Louis Aubert "Puisses-Tu"
- Digigraph Bruxelles - l’INA – Imagina 1990 – K’mel Brother Rap
