= Crache Ton Venin =

Crache ton venin

Studio album by Téléphone
- Released: 2 April 1979
- Studio: Studios Pathé, Paris; Red Bus Studios, London; Advision Studios, London
- Genre: French rock
- Label: Pathé-Marconi
- Producer: Martin Rushent

Téléphone chronology
Téléphone (1977)	Crache ton venin (1979)	Au Cœur De La Nuit (1980)

Crache Ton Venin is the second album by French rock band Téléphone. The title, translating literally as 'Spit Your Venom', is also the name for the album's opening track. Released in 1979, it was the album that cemented Téléphone's position as one of the foremost French rock groups of the era, some reviewers citing the sound as being like a French Rolling Stones. The album was recorded in London and produced by Martin Rushent who had previously worked with the Buzzcocks. Laurence Diana acted as the assistant producer.

The album inner cover, outwardly reminiscent of the era's British punk/new-wave designs, was original for the fact that the band's clothes were in fact printed on tracing paper, beneath which the band photo in fact showed the musicians naked (albeit with their legs tactically crossed). The design was created by fashion photographer/director Jean-Baptiste Mondino, later the artistic force behind the band's striking 1984 video for Un autre monde.

The French edition of Rolling Stone magazine named this album the 17th greatest French rock album (out of 100).

== Track listing ==
1. "Crache ton venin" (Jean-Louis Aubert)
2. "Fait divers" (Aubert)
3. "J'suis parti de chez mes parents" (Aubert)
4. "Facile" (Aubert)
5. "La bombe humaine" (Aubert)
6. "J'sais pas quoi faire" (Aubert)
7. "Ne me regarde pas" (Aubert, Louis Bertignac)
8. "Regarde moi" (Richard Kolinka)
9. "Un peu de ton amour" (Aubert)
10. "Tu vas me manquer" (Aubert, Bertignac)

== Personnel ==
Téléphone

- Corine Marienneau - bass
- Jean-Louis Aubert - vocals, guitar
- Louis Bertignac - guitar
- Richard Kolinka - drums
