= Kolinka =

Kolinka is a surname of French origin. Notable people with the surname include:

- Ginette Kolinka (born 1925), French Holocaust survivor
- Richard Kolinka (born 1953), French musician
- Roman Kolinka (born 1986), French actor and restaurateur

== See also ==
- Kolinka (Ouessa), a village in the department and rural commune of Ouessa, Ioba Province, South West Region, Burkina Faso
