= Dure Limite =

Studio album by Téléphone
- Released: May 1982
- Genre: French rock
- Length: 43:28
- Label: Virgin
- Producer: Bob Ezrin

Téléphone chronology
Au Cœur De La Nuit (1980)	Dure Limite (1982)	Un autre monde (1984)

Professional ratings
Review scores
Source	Rating
AllMusic	4/5 stars

Dure Limite (French pronunciation: [dyʁ limit]) is the fourth studio album by French rock band Téléphone, released in 1982 on Virgin Records. The French edition of Rolling Stone magazine named this album the 3rd greatest French rock album (out of 100). Ivan Kral, of the Patti Smith Group, co-wrote the song "Ce soir est ce soir", though his name is spelt Yvan Kral on some CD booklets.

== Track listing ==
All tracks written by Jean-Louis Aubert, unless otherwise noted.

1. "Dure Limite" – 4:38
2. "Ça (C'est Vraiment Toi)" – 4:28
3. "Jour Contre Jour" – 3:37
4. "Ex-Robin des Bois" – 3:26
5. "Le Chat" (Aubert, Marienneau) – 4:55
6. "Serrez" – 3:58
7. "Le Temps" (Aubert, Bertignac) – 4:18
8. "Cendrillon" (Aubert, Bertignac) – 3:58
9. "Juste un Autre Genre" (Aubert, Bertignac) – 3:43
10. "Ce Soir Est Ce Soir" (Aubert, Ivan Kral) – 6:24

The album was number one on the French charts for 7 weeks.

== Members ==
- Jean-Louis Aubert – rhythm guitar, lead vocals
- Louis Bertignac – lead guitar, backing vocals, lead vocals in "Cendrillon"
- Richard Kolinka – drums
- Corine Marienneau – bass, backing vocals, lead vocals in "Le Chat"
