= Ginette Kolinka =

French Auschwitz-Birkenau concentration camp survivor and witness

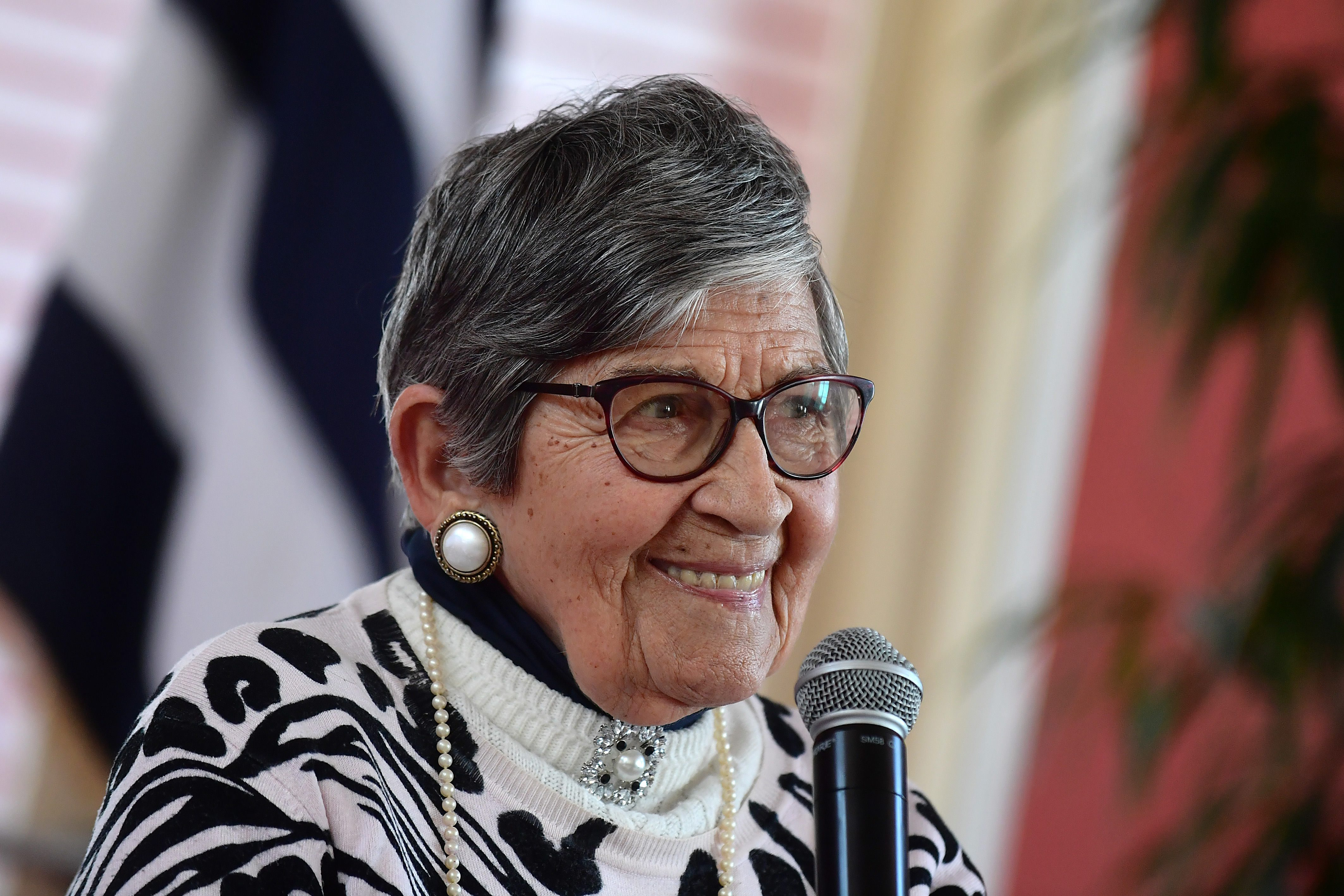
- Ginette Kolinka in 2019
- Born: Ginette Cherkasky; 4 February 1925 (age 101); 4th arrondissement of Paris, France
- Known for: Holocaust survivor
- Spouse: Albert Kolinka (1913-1993)
- Children: Richard Kolinka
- Parents: Léon Cherkasky (1883-1944) (father); Berthe Fairstin (1889-1950) (mother)
- Relatives: Roman Kolinka (grandson)

Ginette Kolinka (born Ginette Cherkasky; 4 February 1925) is a French Holocaust survivor. When her father and brother were taken away to be killed by poison gas, shortly after the train on which they had been transported arrived at Auschwitz, she was selected for factory work and taken to the women's camp. Released in May 1945, she remained silent about her war-time experiences for half a century. Her own explanation for this is that she did not wish to irritate people. Whatever the truth of that, after her husband died, and soon after the dawn of a new century, she became an energetic "ambassador for the memory" of those times, criss-crossing the country to share her holocaust knowledge with school children and students. Thanks to the ensuing media exposure, it is no longer only among children and students that, during the first decades of the twenty-first century, she has heightened awareness of the Shoah and its lessons.

== Biography ==
=== Provenance and early years ===
Ginette Cherkasky was born in the family home at Paris into a non-religious Jewish family, the youngest of her parents' six daughters. After July 1931 there would also be one younger brother. The final decades of the nineteenth century and the first of the twentieth had witnessed massive population shifts from east to west across Europe, drawn by disparities in wage levels and, in the case of Jewish families, driven by pogroms and rumours of them. Her father, Léon, ran a little garments business, manufacturing rain coats. He had been born in Paris. Her paternal grandfather's family, the Cherkaskys, had arrived from Ukraine (at that time, from a mainstream French or English perspective, part of the Russian Empire, even of the local realities were more varied and nuanced). Her mother, born Berthe Fairstin, had been born at Pitești in Romania. Ginette's earliest years were spent in central Paris, after which the family moved to Aubervilliers, just outside the city on its north side. In around 1935 they returned to central Paris, living in a family apartment within the commercial space occupied by her father's manufacturing workshop.

=== War ===
Ginette Cherkasky was 14 when the French government declared war on Germany during the fortnight between the German invasion of Poland from the west and the Russian invasion of Poland from the south and east. She was 15 by the time Germany over-ran France from (primarily) the north during the early summer of 1940. The Paris region was in the northern half of France which, together with the country's Atlantic coast, came under direct German military administration, while the southern half of the country was less directly controlled, through a puppet government. Thousands of Parisians fled south. At this stage Cherkasky's family remained in the Paris region, however. During 1941 her uncle and a brother-in-law were arrested, probably in connection with their Jewish provenance.

=== Escape to the south ===
It was almost certainly during July 1942 that, with her parents and younger brother, Ginette Cherkasky hastily set off towards the southern half of France, which at this stage could still be identified without excessive irony as the "free zone". The previous evening an official from the préfecture had turned up at the door. The official had come across a reference to the family in the préfecture files, and had come to warn them of something contained in them: "You are Jews and communists, you should leave Paris!" Léon Cherkasky simply nodded: it is not clear whether he had even recognised their unexpected visitor. Later that evening he made his way to the café at the nearby "Carreau du Temple" (covered market), a well-known meeting place where it was possible to find people willing and able to help refugees. He procured forged identity papers, and before they left in the morning made sure that the children had all memorised their new names. Cherkasky insisted that the family should split into smaller groups of three or four, each of which travelled separately by different routes. There are hints that initially the children - at least the youngest of them, accompanying their parents - thought they were embarking on some sort of "grand vacation": reality was very much grimmer. Armed with forged identity documents they settled in Avignon.

=== Arrest ===
During the lunch hour on 13 March 1944 Ginette, her father Léon Cherkasky, her twelve-year-old brother Gilbert Cherkasky and her fourteen year old nephew, still in his school uniform, were arrested by a group of Gestapo and collaborationist militia men. Someone had denounced them to the authorities. It seems that the arresting officers had only "come for the men", but Ginette was also arrested because she protested over what was being done. Ginette herself had almost stayed outside and missed lunch entirely, enjoying the marvellous weather, but had been persuaded to join the family meal by her sister, who had pointed out that they were having roast veal for lunch. Her mother missed seeing the arrests, having been upstairs ill in bed at the time.

They were held initially at a detention facility in Avignon, and then, "for between ten and fourteen days", at the recently completed prison at Les Baumettes (Marseille). She noticed that everyone on the transfer bus between the two facilities was apparently Jewish. The boy seated next to her also carried clear scars of recent torture. The palms of his hands had been burned and his finger nails ripped out. It turned out that he was both Jewish and a Résistance activist. The horrors of Auschwitz still lay in the future, and Ginette was silently relieved that her only "crime" was that of being Jewish. At Les Baumettes she was separated from her father, brother and nephew, and placed in a cell with three other girls.

She was then taken to the nearby railway station where she saw with her male family members. Her father was chained to her little brother with handcuffs and her nephew was chained to Szlama Rozenberg, the father of Marceline. (Marceline Rozenberg, better known to posterity by her married name as Marceline Loridan-Ivens was a fellow detainee who later became a life-long friend.) The women were kept separate from the men, both on the platform and on the train, however, and the railway carriage in which they travelled was closely supervised by police and German soldiers. The train journey from Marseille to Lyon felt long, but they were not tied down for it. At Lyon they were transferred to a bus to Drancy, a suburb in the already sprawling conurbation to the north of Paris, felt (and was) longer.

=== Drancy ===
The "Cité de la Muette" was a large modernist residential development on which, following much discussion and planning, work had commenced in 1932. It had been intended to incorporate extensive sports, social and cultural facilities, together with organised nursery provision and schools, a cinema, a library, a grocery store and, at the insistence of the diocese, a church. But during the 1930s the French economy had not bounced back from the Great Depression with the same level of deficit-funded vigour as that experienced in Germany or England. Reality for the "Cité de la Muette" project had involved frequent funding freezes. When war broke out and northern France fell under German control in 1940, only the vast apartment development, consisting of the U-shaped series of linked six-storey "towers", completed back in 1934, and an adjacent school, were more or less ready for use.

Between 1941 and 1944 the site was repurposed as the Drancy internment camp, initially administered by French police and later under the direct control of German Nazi paramilitaries. The bus transporting Ginette Cherkasky arrived at the facility on 31 March 1944, by which time Drancy was long-established as a transit camp for processing Jews from across France for onward transportation to death camps in the east of Germany.

=== Auschwitz ===
Six weeks later, on 13 April 1944, a train carrying 1,499 or 1,500 Jews (sources differ) set off from Bobigny station, near to the Drancy camp. The train was composed of wagons originally intended for transporting livestock. This was the transport identified in records as "Convoi (Transport) n° 71". There were 624 males, 854 females and 22 whose genders went unrecorded. On 16 April 1944 the train reached the former goods station beside the Auschwitz concentration camp. 165 men from it were selected for forced labour and tattooed appropriately with their sequentially allocated numbers. 91 women were also picked out as labourers. Ginette was tattooed with the number "78599". The others were sent to the extermination facility to be killed by gassing. Her father, Léon Cherkasky, aged 61 and her brother Gilbert Cherkasky, aged 12, were among those immediately sent to be murdered. There was a truck waiting on the platform for those considered too weak to walk to the killing chambers. Unaware at this stage of its destination, Ginette urged her father and young brother to grab a place on the truck. They did so, and therefore were among the first to arrive at the killing location. The fate of Ginette's 14 year-old nephew remains unknown.

An early shock at the camp was the total absence of any sort of personal privacy. The nineteen year old had never seen even her sisters without clothes. Now she was forced to stand together with dozens of strange women stark naked. The slaughter of war had left Germany desperately short of working-age population, and much of the administration and upkeep at the concentration camp was carried out by trusted inmates. It was fellow prisoners who tattooed her number on her skin and shaved her head. After that she was given clothes - just an old sweater and a skirt: no underwear. Then they were sent to the shower. A few drops of water trickled out: "We looked at each other, naked, ashamed, skulls shaved, trembling and degraded. Humiliated." (Note: "Wir sehen uns an, nackt, Scham und Schädel rasiert, schlotternd und verstört. Erniedrigt".)

Further tortures awaited the new arrivals when they came to the barrack hut where they were to be accommodated. Discipline was enforced by overseers and "kapos", fellow prisoners who had gained the confidence of the guards and thereby achieved promotion in the camp hierarchy. They beat the "junior" inmates at every opportunity. Violence was part of everyday life. If anyone failed to stand precisely in line for a roll call, if someone fell ill or was too weakened to work, or simply from the sadistic urges of the perpetrators, the outcome was physical assault". Half a century later, after she felt able to write it all down, Kolinka recalled that she had been "beaten the whole time, all through the day, for nothing, nothing, nothing". (Note: "... die ganze Zeit geschlagen, den ganzen Tag, für nichts und wieder nichts ...".) The other searing memory was the constant intense hunger. A piece of bread was precious and, if not eaten at once, must be well hidden. "Everyone stole from everyone".

=== Bergen-Belsen ===
After six months, during October or November 1944 Ginette Cherkasky was transferred to the Bergen-Belsen concentration camp (north of Hannover). At the end of an 800 km two day train journey, they reached the camp where they found some French women behind a large grill at one end of the vast site, accompanied by children. The first reaction of French women arriving from Auschwitz was one of intense jealousy. They called out: "How come you're there with your children. You're so lucky!". The assumption - almost certainly correct - on the part of the women from Auschwitz whose lives had been spared in order that they might work, was that the children removed from them had been promptly killed. It was while imprisoned at Bergen-Belsen that Ginette Cherkasky was employed in a factory producing aircraft components. As the Soviet army advanced, camps in the east of the country were evacuated, and the overcrowding at Bergen-Belsen worsened steadily. In the end she contracted Typhus fever, though she would have left the camp by the time her symptoms peaked.

=== Final transport ===
One morning at the end of April 1945 all the inmates were called together, nightshift and dayshift workers together. Anglo-American and Soviet armies, approaching from west and east, were drawing closer. The camp was to be closed: a roll call was taken. Two people were missing. After a long wait her friend Marceline Rozenberg was found with one other inmate, well hidden but not well enough to remain undetected. The soldiers overseeing the evacuation, already highly nervous, were further enraged by the hiatus. Once they had been loaded into the railway wagons there was more space than might have been expected. The train started to move, but it kept stopping. Evidently their transport to ... wherever, was a low priority. At one of the stops she heard train doors open. The soldiers left the train. The prisoners were on their own, without food and without water. The journey continued, as before, with frequent stops. Munitions trains and trains transporting military personnel were receiving priority at junctions. Without food or drink, prisoners, including Ginette became increasingly ill. There were deaths. At the end of a seven-day journey the train made its final halt. This time there was again noise from outside the wagon of soldiers shouting and wagon doors being opened. She managed to emerge from the wagen and, unable to stand, crawl along beside the track trying to eat grass as a corrective against her hunger and thirst. Then she heard the sound of running water. Prisoners had found a way to drain the water from a locomotive along the track. Survivors gathered round to drink.

=== Theresienstadt, Typhus ===
It turned out that they had been transferred to the concentration camp at Theresienstadt (north of Prague). As the train arrived from Bergen-Belsen, far to the north, the camp was in the process of being liberated by Soviet soldiers from the east. Ginette Cherkasky would remember little of the next few weeks, which she spent in some sort of hospital accommodation with a high fever. After approximately three weeks the Typhus fever was starting to relent, however. She would remember bizarre nightmarish dreams, apparently experienced while in a coma. She would remember being looked after by red-cross staff, possibly of Czechoslovak nationality. Amazingly, there were no soldiers to be seen. On regaining consciousness she was still very weak. Outside the hospital military administration was starting to be implemented and new pre-agreed frontiers were coming into existence. Although there were soldiers from the Soviet Union and from the United States around, the Americans were preparing to withdraw towards the west. Ginette Cherkasky and another sick French girl, identifying herself by the name Victoire, caught a lift towards the west with the last American truck to leave town. Victoire was planning to move to the United States, and left them, after an overnight halt at a requisitioned chateau, by the airfield at Tielsen(?) near Prague from where she planned to find a flight. It may have been from the same airfield that Ginette would be placed on her own repatriation flight. The journey on the army truck was acutely painful due to her famished physique, but there were occasions along the way when it was possible to lie and sleep on a stretcher. On 6 June 1945 she was repatriated on a flight to France and arrived at Lyon in the east of the country.

=== Paris ===
At Lyon she assumed she would be sent to a hospital. Everything changed when a man - she would never find out who he was - recognised her as "one of Cherkasky's daughters". He informed her that her mother and sisters were living in Paris in the same apartment as before. Instead of transferring into a hospital, that evening she found her way to the station and took the train to Paris, with many others making the same journey which, at that time, took all night. At the Gare de Lyon in Paris she was met, and escorted on a bus, to the Hôtel Lutetia, where "le général" had installed a Provisional Government of the French Republic, following the Liberation of Paris in August 1944. Much of the building was now being used as a repatriation centre for prisoners of war, displaced persons, and returnees from the German concentration camps. Ginette Cherkasky was taken to a succession of offices where she answered long lists of questions, and then took a bus to the stop near the family home. There was an awkward meeting at the entrance desk to the apartment block where the concierge assumed she was not a young woman, but her little brother, Gilbert Cherkasky, (who by this time would have been 14 if he had been still been alive). The sight of Ginette alone, barefoot and virtually bald, wearing an old military sweater and weighing 26 kg, must have been a shocking vision. When she went upstairs to the apartment, and after frantic embraces, her mother and four sisters were all eager for news of Gilbert and her father.

=== Albert Kolinka ===
Ginette Cherkasky married Albert Kolinka on 13 April 1951. Kolinka had worked in forestry before 1939, after that, he had spent five years as a prisoner of war. After their marriage, the two embarked on a shared career as market traders. Their son Richard was born in July 1953, and grew up to become a drummer. Between 1976 and its dissolution in 1986 he became famous as the drummer for the rock band Téléphone.

=== Toxic memories ===
In 1947 Ginette Cherkasky went dancing. At one stage the sleeve of her blouse fell away, revealing the number "78599" tattooed on her arm. "Afraid of losing your telephone number?" jested her gallant dancing partner. She did not dance with that him again. For more than forty years she and her husband ran a hosiery, knitwear and haberdashery stall in the market at Aubervilliers. She was not ready to discuss her experiences of the Holocaust, and would firmly dismiss any attempts by others to ask her about them. After her husband died in 1993, and her son became an adult, that started to change. In the early 2000s she joined an association of surviving war-time deportees and began to speak out, sharing her experiences with a new generation, in order to awaken awareness of the murderous consequences of racist ideologies.

== Recognition (selection) ==
- 2 April 2010: Ginette Kolinka was appointed to a knighthood in the Legion of Honour.
- 27 January 2016: Ginette Kolinka was appointed a commander of the education-related Ordre des Palmes académiques by Education Minister Najat Vallaud-Belkacem.
- 31 December 2018: Ginette Kolinka was promoted within the Legion of Honour, becoming an officer of the order.
- 8 May 2020: Ginette Kolinka appeared on the respected and popular - if sometimes sensationalist - daily radio magazine programne "Hondelatte raconte" at the invitation of Christophe Hondelatte.
