= Public telephone =

Public telephone may refer to:

- Call box
- Courtesy telephone
- Emergency telephone
- Payphone
- Police box
- Red telephone box
- Telephone booth
- Public Telephone (film), a 1980 French documentary film
