= Au Cœur de la Nuit =

Au cœur de la nuit

Studio album by Téléphone
- Released: 20 October 1980
- Studio: Studio Pathé, Boulogne-Billancourt; Electric Lady Studios, New York
- Genre: French rock
- Length: 41:42
- Label: Pathé-Marconi
- Producer: Martin Rushent

Téléphone chronology
Crache Ton Venin (1979)	Au cœur de la nuit (1980)	Dure Limite (1982)

Au cœur de la nuit is an album by French rock band Téléphone, released in 1980.

The French edition of Rolling Stone magazine named this album the 13th greatest French rock album (out of 100).

== Track listing ==
All tracks composed by Jean-Louis Aubert; except where indicated

1. "Au Cœur de la Nuit" - 3:28
2. "Ploum ploum" - 1:54
3. "Pourquoi N'essaies-tu Pas?" - 3:23
4. "Seul" - 3:01
5. "Laisse tomber" - 4:23
6. "Un homme + un homme" - 2:00
7. "Les Ils et les Ons" - 2:56
8. "Argent Trop Cher" - 4:08
9. "Ordinaire" - 2:36
10. "2000 Nuits" (Louis Bertignac) - 2:27
11. "Fleur de ma Ville" - 3:13
12. "La Laisse" - 3:24
13. "Le Silence" - 4:36

== Personnel ==
Téléphone

- Jean-Louis Aubert - vocals, guitar
- Louis Bertignac - guitar, lead vocals on "2000 Nuits"
- Corine Marienneau - bass
- Richard Kolinka - drums

with:

- Cowboy - saxophone on "Argent Trop Cher"
- Lynn Goldsmith - photography
