= Sedkaoui =

Sedkaoui is a surname. It may refer to:

- Akram Sedkaoui, French singer, contestant in season 3 of The Voice: la plus belle voix (France)
- Atef Sedkaoui, French singer, contestant in season 1 of The Voice: la plus belle voix (France)
- Kaci Sedkaoui (born 1986), Algerian football player
