= Stockholm (Jean-Louis Aubert album) =

Studio album by Jean-Louis Aubert
- Released: 1997
- Recorded: Paris, Stockholm
- Genre: Rock, Electronic
- Length: 56:24
- Label: Virgin
- Producer: Jean-Louis Aubert

Jean-Louis Aubert chronology
H (1993)	Stockholm (1997)	Comme un accord (2001)

Stockholm a French solo album by Jean-Louis Aubert, released in 1997 by Virgin Records. It includes the singles "Océan" and "Le Jour Se Lève Encore".

== Track listing ==
Side A

1. [Intro] (0:13)
2. "Stockholm" (3:29)
3. "Océan" (4:24)
4. "Le jour se lève encore" (3:38)
5. "La P'tite Semaine" (4:14)
6. "Juste pour aujourd'hui" (5:38)
7. "Vivrant Poème" (3:35)
8. "Abandonne-toi" (3:43)

Side B

9. "Je crois en tout, je n'crois en rien" (4:34)
10. "Le Milieu" (4:39)
11. "La Suite" (4:02)
12. "Tombe de haut" (4:45)
13. "Fais ton voyage" (4:40)
14. "Baltic" (4:54)

== Personnel ==
- Jean-Louis Aubert
- Gordon Cyrus - electronic drums, bass, effects, mixing
- Gunnar Norden - violins
- Doc Matéo - multi-instruments, mix
- Richard Kolinka - drums
- Ski - electronic drums on "Océan"
- Le Baron - guitar on "Le Jour se Lève Encore"
- Olive - guitar on "La P'tite Semaine"
- Tony Allen - drums on "Abandonne-toi"
- Mats Asplen - synthesizer on "Je Crois en tout, Je n'Croix en rien"

Technical

- Raphael - mixing
