= Stéphan Rizon =

French singer (born 1987)

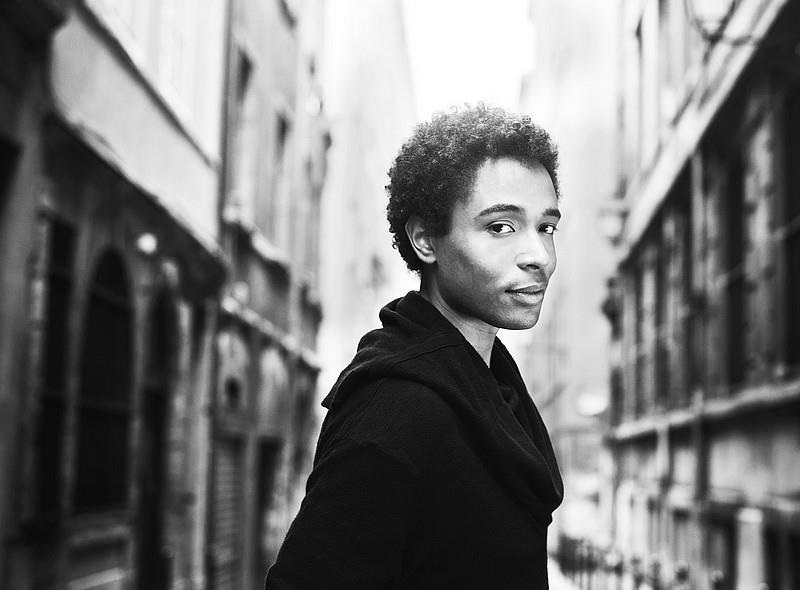

Background information
- Born: February 24, 1987 (age 39); Agen, France
- Occupation: Singer
- Instrument: Vocals

Stéphan Rizon (born February 24, 1987, in Agen, France) is a French singer who in 2012 won the inaugural season of The Voice: la plus belle voix, the French version of the international The Voice reality television series.

== The Voice: la plus belle voix ==
Rizon auditioned to the series singing "Rolling in the Deep from Adele in the blind audition episode broadcast on 3 March 2012 and only one of the four judges, Florent Pagny, turned his chair within the last few seconds of the song, whereas all three other judges Jenifer Bartoli, Louis Bertignac and Garou failed to hit their "Je vous veux" ("I Want You") buttons and he was included in "Team Florent". In the battle stage, Garou put him against a Team Florent contestant Jua Amir with both singing "Kiss" from Prince. Pagny chose Rizon to go the next round.

In the live shows, he sang "Over the Rainbow" and saved by the public by receiving the highest votes from Team Florent contestants, and in the semi-finals sang "With a Little Help from My Friends" from The Beatles and was saved by public vote and the coach with weights 100 for public vote and 50 for coach nomination. In the final he sang "Think" from Aretha Franklin, in addition to Lucio Dalla's "Caruso" as well as teaming up with Johnny Hallyday in a duo rendition of Hallyday's "Requiem pour un fou", and teaming up with his mentor coach Florent Pagny in "You Raise Me Up" to capture the title with 31.5% of the public vote against runner-up Louis Delort mentored by Garou with 29.9% of the vote, Al.Hy coached by Jenifer Bartoli third with 24.1%. Finalist Aude Henneville from Louis Bertignac Team finished fourth with just 14.5% of the public vote.

== After The Voice ==
Rizon went on to sign a record deal with Mercury Music Group / Universal Music and his debut album released in October 2012 is entitled From Mars with Love.

== Discography ==
=== Albums ===
Year	Album	Peak positions	Certification	Notes
Year	Album	FR	Certification	Notes
2012	Stéphan Rizon - The Voice - La plus belle voix: L'album de tous ses titres!	36		Included: 1. "Rolling in the Deep" (3:52); 2. "Over the Rainbow" (3:35); 3. "House of the Rising Sun" / "Le pénitencier" [Medley] (4:26); 4. "New York New York" (3:13); 5. "With a Little Help from My Friends" (3:52); 6. "Think" (3:05); 7. "Caruso" (4:34)
2012	From Mars with Love	27		

=== Singles ===
- 2012: "Rolling in the Deep" - Through downloads of his The Voice: la plus belle voix audition (FR: 2 weeks, reaching #172)
- 2012: "With a Little Help From My Friends" - Through downloads of his The Voice: la plus belle voix audition (FR 2 weeks, reaching #138)

Preceded by N/A	The Voice: la plus belle voix Winner; 2012	Succeeded by Yoann Fréget
