= Richard Kolinka =

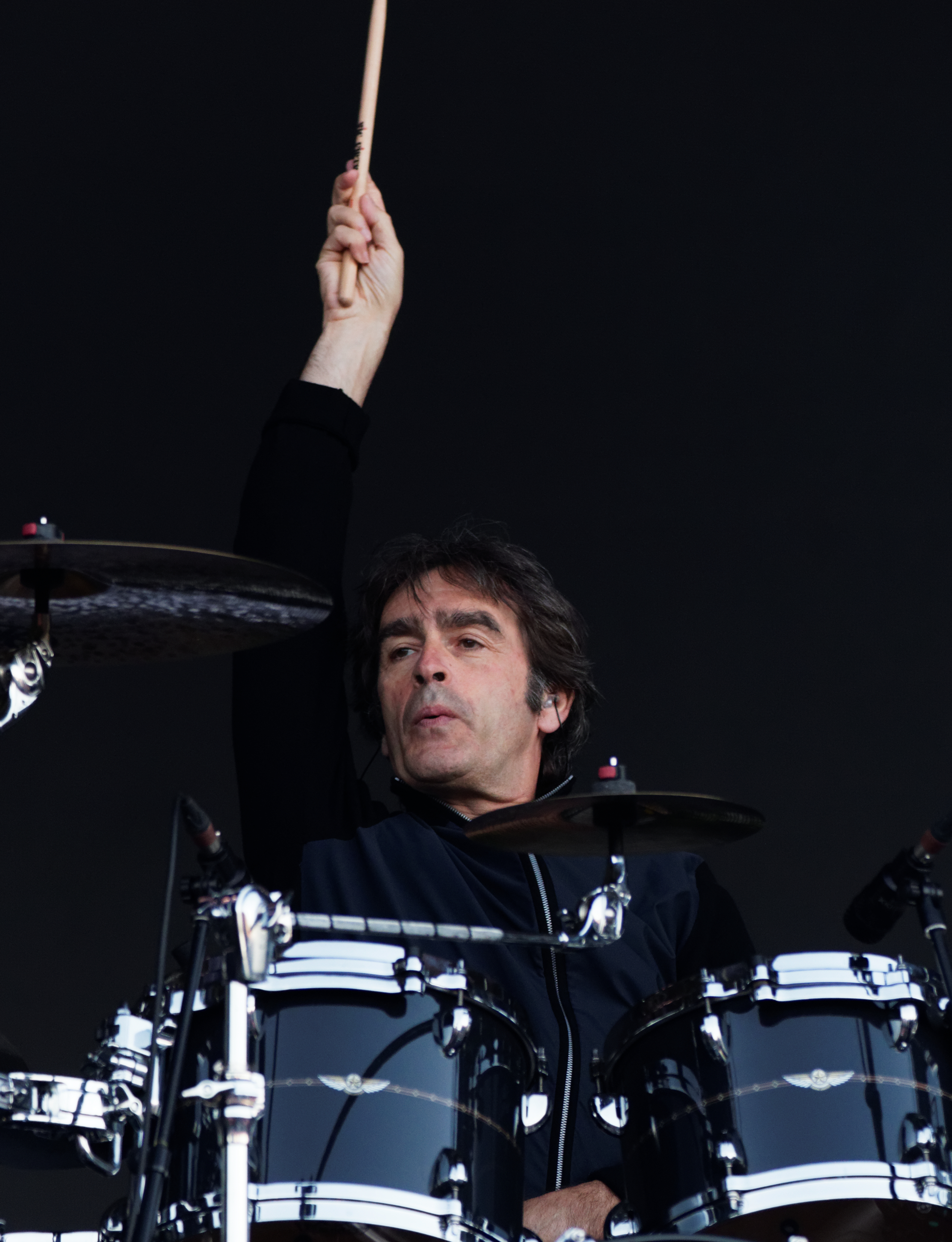
- Kolinka performing with Les Insus at the Vieilles Charrues festival 2016
- Born: Richard Léon Raphaël Kolinka; 7 July 1953 (age 73); Paris, France
- Occupation: Musician
- Children: 2
- Musical career
- Genres: Rock; French rock
- Instrument: Drums
- Years active: 1967–present
- Formerly of: Téléphone

Richard Léon Raphaël Kolinka (born 7 July 1953) is a French musician who was the drummer for the rock band Téléphone. After the breakup of the band, he worked with Jean-Louis Aubert, Louis Bertignac, and Alice Cooper.

== Discography ==
=== With Téléphone ===
- Téléphone (1977)
- Crache Ton Venin (1979)
- Au Cœur de la Nuit (1980)
- Dure Limite (1982)
- Un autre monde (1984)

=== With Jean-Louis Aubert ===
- Plâtre et Ciment (1987)
- Bleu Blanc Vert (1989)
- H (1993)
- Stockholm (1997)
- Idéal standard (2005)

=== With Louis Bertignac ===
- Rocks (1990)
- 96 (1996)
- Longtemps (2005)

=== With Alice Cooper ===
- DaDa (1983)
