= Un autre monde (Téléphone album) =

Studio album by Téléphone
- Released: 7 May 1984
- Recorded: February–March 1984
- Studio: Sussex, England
- Genre: Pop rock; new wave
- Length: 39:31
- Label: EMI France
- Producer: Glyn Johns

Téléphone chronology
| Dure Limite (1982) | Un autre monde (1984) |

Singles from Un autre monde
- 1. "Oublie ça" Released: 1984; 2. "Un autre monde" Released: 1984; 3. "New York avec toi" Released: 1985

Un autre monde (Another World) is the fifth and final album by French rock band Téléphone, released on 7 May 1984 by EMI France. The album features John Entwistle (of English rock band the Who) playing the horn.

== Track listing ==
All tracks are written by Jean-Louis Aubert/Téléphone unless otherwise indicated.

| No. | Title | Writer(s) | Length |
|---|---|---|---|
| 1. | "Les dunes" | | 4:10 |
| 2. | "New York avec toi" | | 2:23 |
| 3. | "Loin de toi (un peu trop loin)" | | 3:02 |
| 4. | "66 heures" | Louis Bertignac/Téléphone | 2:18 |
| 5. | "Ce que je veux" | | 3:05 |
| 6. | "Le garçon d'ascenseur" | | 4:56 |
| 7. | "Oublie ça" | | 4:12 |
| 8. | "T'as qu'ces mots" | | 2:50 |
| 9. | "Le taxi las" | | 3:56 |
| 10. | "Electric cité" | | 4:08 |
| 11. | "Un autre monde" | | 4:30 |

== Personnel ==
=== Téléphone ===
- Jean-Louis Aubert – lead vocals, rhythm guitar, piano
- Louis Bertignac – lead guitar, backing vocals, lead vocals on "66 heures", "Le garçon d'ascenseur", and "Oublie ça"
- Corine Marienneau – bass guitar, backing vocals
- Richard Kolinka – percussion, backing vocals

=== Additional Musicians ===
- John Entwistle – horn on "T'as qu'ces mots"
- Wix Wickens – accordion and synthesizer on "T'as qu'ces mots"

=== Production ===
- Glyn Johns – production
- François Ravard – management

=== Design ===
- François Sévemon – cover art
- Lynn Goldsmith – photography
- Penny Smith – photography
- Jean-Baptiste Mondino – photography
