= Téléphone =

French rock band

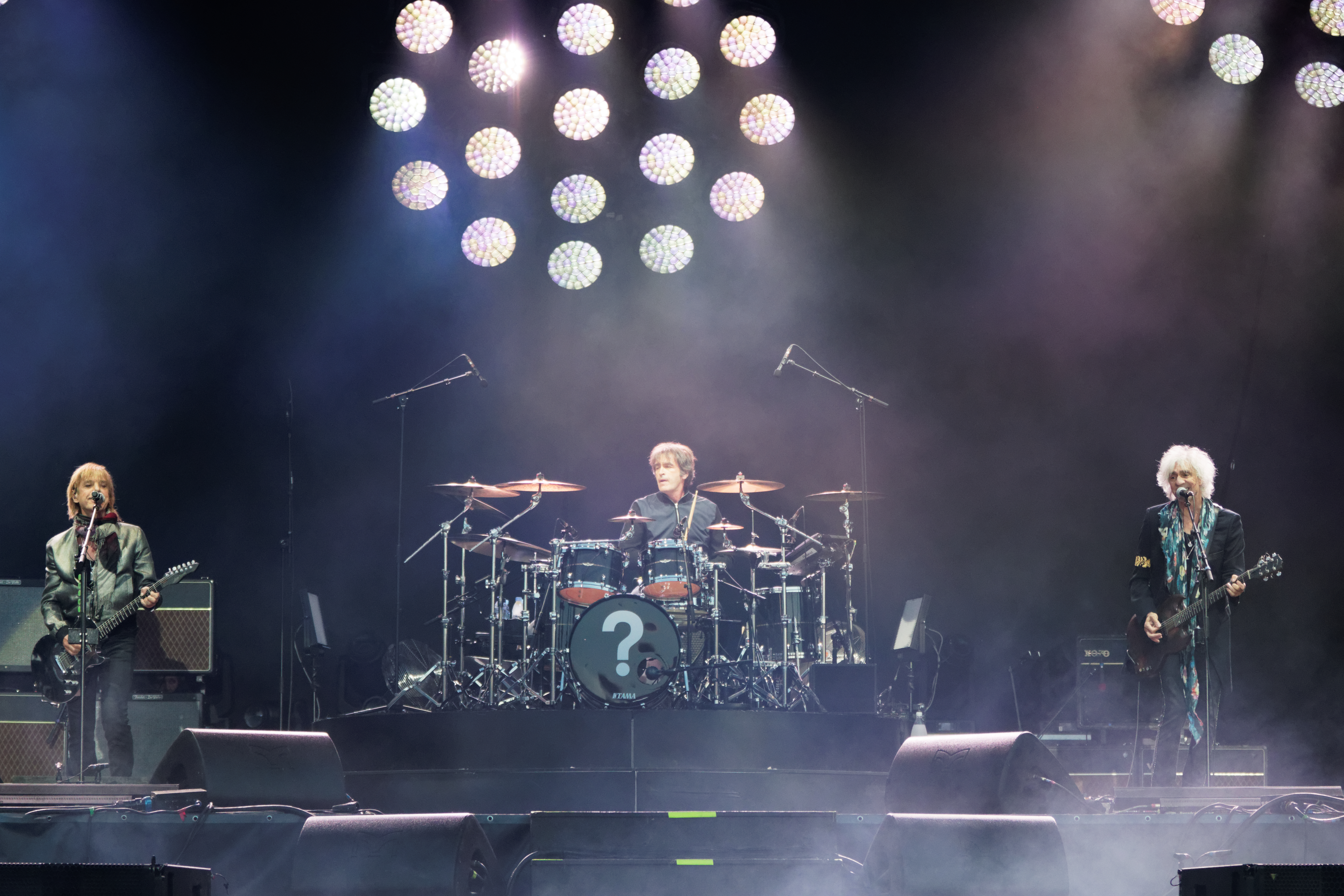
- Téléphone in 2016

Background information
- Origin: Paris, France
- Genres: Rock; pop rock
- Years active: 1976–1986 (Téléphone); 2015–2017 (Les Insus?)
- Labels: EMI; Virgin
- Past members: Jean-Louis Aubert; Louis Bertignac; Corine Marienneau; Richard Kolinka

Téléphone (French pronunciation: [telefɔn]) was a French rock band formed in 1976. Their first, self-titled album was released in 1977; by the end of the decade they were one of the biggest French rock bands in the world, opening shows for The Rolling Stones in Paris, Quebec, the United States and Japan. The band split in 1986 for personal reasons. They have sold around 10 million albums to date, a record still unbeaten for a French rock band.

Among their best-known songs are "Hygiaphone", "Métro c'est trop" ("Metro's Too Much"), "La bombe humaine" ("Human bomb"), "Argent trop cher" ("Money Too Expensive"), "Ça c'est vraiment toi" ("That Is So You"), "Cendrillon" ("Cinderella"), "New York avec toi" ("New York City With You") and "Un autre Monde" ("Another World").

== Members ==
- Jean-Louis Aubert - guitar, piano, vocals
- Louis Bertignac - guitar, vocals
- Richard Kolinka - drums
- Corine Marienneau - bass, piano, vocals

== Reformation as "Les Insus" (2015-2017) ==
The band reunited briefly for a concert at the Point Éphémère on 11 September 2015 under the name "Les Insus" (pronounced [lezɛ̃sy]; insupportables, meaning insufferable. The elided name also suggests the word portable, meaning "cellphone" in French, thus implying an upgrade to modern times). Les Insus was composed of Aubert, Bertignac and Kolinka but with the bassist Corine Marienneau replaced on the bass guitar by Aleksander Angelov (hence the reason they were not able to use the name "Téléphone"). Another concert was held in Lille on 15 September. Les Insus also gave a concert in Lyon, at Le Transbordeur, on 6 October 2015. On 29 November 2015 the new group announced a real tour in France (in which Corine Marienneau would not participate) for 2016. The tour was scheduled from 27 April to 11 November in several major cities and several festivals. On 12 November, they announced a tour of the festivals in summer 2017 and a final gig at the Stade de France on 15 September. The live album Les Insus Live was released on 8 September.

== Discography ==
=== Studio albums ===
- Téléphone (1977) - peaked in FRA at #2
- Crache Ton Venin (1979) - peaked in FRA at #2
- Au Cœur de la Nuit (1980) - peaked in FA at #3
- Dure Limite (1982) - peaked in FRA at #1
- Un autre monde (1984), featuring John Entwistle of The Who - peaked in FRA at #2

=== Live albums ===
Year	Album	Peak positions	Notes
Year	Album	FR	Notes
2000	Enconcert (Paris 81)	52	Tracklist: Tracklist: "Crache ton venin", "Faits divers", "Au cœur de la nuit", "Ploum ploum", "Fleur de ma ville", "Argent trop cher", "Ordinaire", "La bombe humaine", "Laisse Tomber", "Seul", "Téléphomme", "Hygiaphone", "Tu vas me manquer", "Le Silence".
2011	Le Live	133	Tracklist: "Au cœur de la nuit", "Fait divers", "Dure limite", "Un peu de ton amour", "La bombe humaine", "Cendrillon", "New York avec toi", "Electric Cité", "Le Taxi-las", "Juste un autre genre", "Ce que je veux", "Argent trop cher", "Ça (c'est vraiment toi)", "Un autre monde", "Hygiaphone", "Fleur de ma ville".
2012	Illimité	175	CD1: Compilation / CD2: Live

Les Insus

- 2017: Les Insus - Hygiaphone (Live 2017)

=== Compilation albums ===
Year	Album	Peak positions		Notes
Year	Album	FR	BEL (Wa)	Notes
2015	Au cœur de Téléphone	11	31	Best Of 2CDs / Best Of 3CDs

=== DVDs ===
- 1980: Téléphone Public

=== Singles ===
Year	Album	Peak positions	Certification
Year	Album	FR	Certification
1982	"Ça (C'est vraiment toi)"	–	
1984	"Un autre monde"	5	
1984	"Le jour s'est levé"	4	

- 2012: "Ça (C'est vraiment toi)" (re-release) - peaked in FRA at #133

== Awards ==
Album Un autre monde won French awards "Victoire de la musique Album Rock" in 1985.
