= Jean-Louis Aubert =

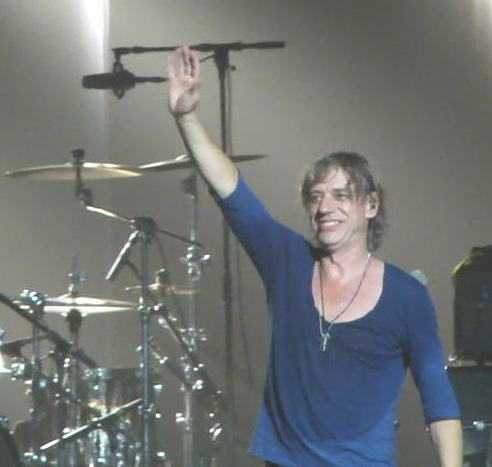
- Jean-Louis Aubert performing in Strasbourg (25 June 2011)

Background information
- Born: 12 April 1955 (age 71); Nantua, Ain, France
- Genres: Rock, pop
- Occupation: Singer
- Instruments: Vocals, guitar, piano, harmonica, drums, lap steel
- Years active: 1976–present
- Label: Virgin EMI
- Formerly of: Téléphone
- Website: www.jeanlouisaubert.com

Jean-Louis Aubert (French pronunciation: [ʒɑ̃lwi obɛːʁ], born 12 April 1955) is a French singer-songwriter, guitarist, composer and producer. He went on a solo career after the split of the rock band Téléphone that he co-founded.

== Early life ==
Born in Nantua, Ain, France in 1955, Aubert and his two sisters moved with his parents to Senlis, Oise, where his father was a sub-prefect. He was raised by their service people. In 1965, his family moved to Paris. Although he was in the scouts and the choir, Aubert was a difficult child.

Later, he went to school at Lycée Pasteur (Neuilly-sur-Seine) with his friends Louis Bertignac and Olivier Caudron. At the age of 15, they founded their first band, Masturbation. He got his high school diploma in 1973. Rarely focused on his studies, he was already dedicating most of his time to music.

French charts with rock band Téléphone:

- Anna: 2
- Crache ton venin: 2
- Au coeur de la nuit:3
- Dure limite: 1
- Un autre monde: 2

French awards:

- "Victoire de la musique" 1985 with rock band Téléphone.
- "Sacem price musique vivante" 1985 with Téléphone.
- "Album RTL" 2011.
- "victoire de la musique" Roc éclair tour 2012.
- "victoire de la musique" 30 ans de rock 2015.

== Solo discography ==
(For discography with French rock band Téléphone, refer to discography section)

=== Studio albums ===
Year	Album	Record label	Peak positions		
Year	Album	Record label	FRA	BEL (Wa)	SWI
1987	Plâtre et ciment!	Virgin	–	–	–
1992	Bleu blanc vert	Virgin	–	–	–
1997	Stockholm	Virgin	2	43	–
2001	Comme un accord	Virgin	9	35	–
2005	Idéal standard	Virgin	3	20	73
2009	Premières prises	Virgin	16	47	–
2012	Roc-éclair	EMI	2	10	53
2014	Aubert chante Houellebecq – Les parages du vide	Parlophone	2	3	41
2016	Morituri	Parlophone	–	–	66
2024	Pafini	Parlophone	–	3	–
2024	Morituri	Parlophone	–	–	66

=== Live albums ===
Year	Album	Record label	Peak positions		
Year	Album	Record label	FR	BEL (Wa)	SWI
1994	Une Page De Tournée / Deux Pages De Tournée	Virgin	–	–	–
1998	Concert Privé M6	Virgin	13	–	–
2006	Idéal Tour	Virgin	–	–	–
2012	Live = vivant	EMI France	8	11	–
2022	Olo Tour	Parlophone	17	43	–

=== Live DVD ===
- Comme on a fait (2003, Virgin)
- Idéal Tour (2006, Virgin)
- Un tour sur moi-même, avec vous (2008, Virgin)

=== Compilation ===
- Comme on a dit (2003, Virgin) 1986–2003

=== Box Set ===
- Long Box (2002, 3 CDs, Virgin) 1986–2001

=== Singles ===
Year	Single	Peak positions	Album
Year	Single	FR	Album
1994	"Temps à nouveau"	34	
2001	"Alter ego"	31	
2002	"Commun accord"	78	
2002	"Milliers, millions, milliards"	88	
2003	"Sur la route" (with Raphaël)	29	
2005	"Parle-moi"	29	
2006	"Ailleurs"	51	
2008	"Il y a longtemps que je t'aime"	35	
2011	"Demain sera parfait"	55	
2011	"Puisses-tu"	100	
2012	"Marcelle"	183	
2012	"Vingt ans"	193	
2012	"A l'eau"	200	
2014	"Noir et blanc [Live]" (Bruel / Maé / Aubert / Maunier / Les Enfoirés)	181	
2014	"Manu"	159	La Bande à Renaud

== Filmography ==
=== As composer ===
- Pour faire un bon voyage, prenons le train (short), 1973
- I've Loved You So Long (Il ya longtemps que je t'aime), 2007
- One for the Road (Le Dernier pour la route), 2009
- Jealousy (La Jalousie), 2013
- In the Shadow of Women (L'Ombre des femmes), 2015
