= Louis Bertignac =

French musician (born 1954)

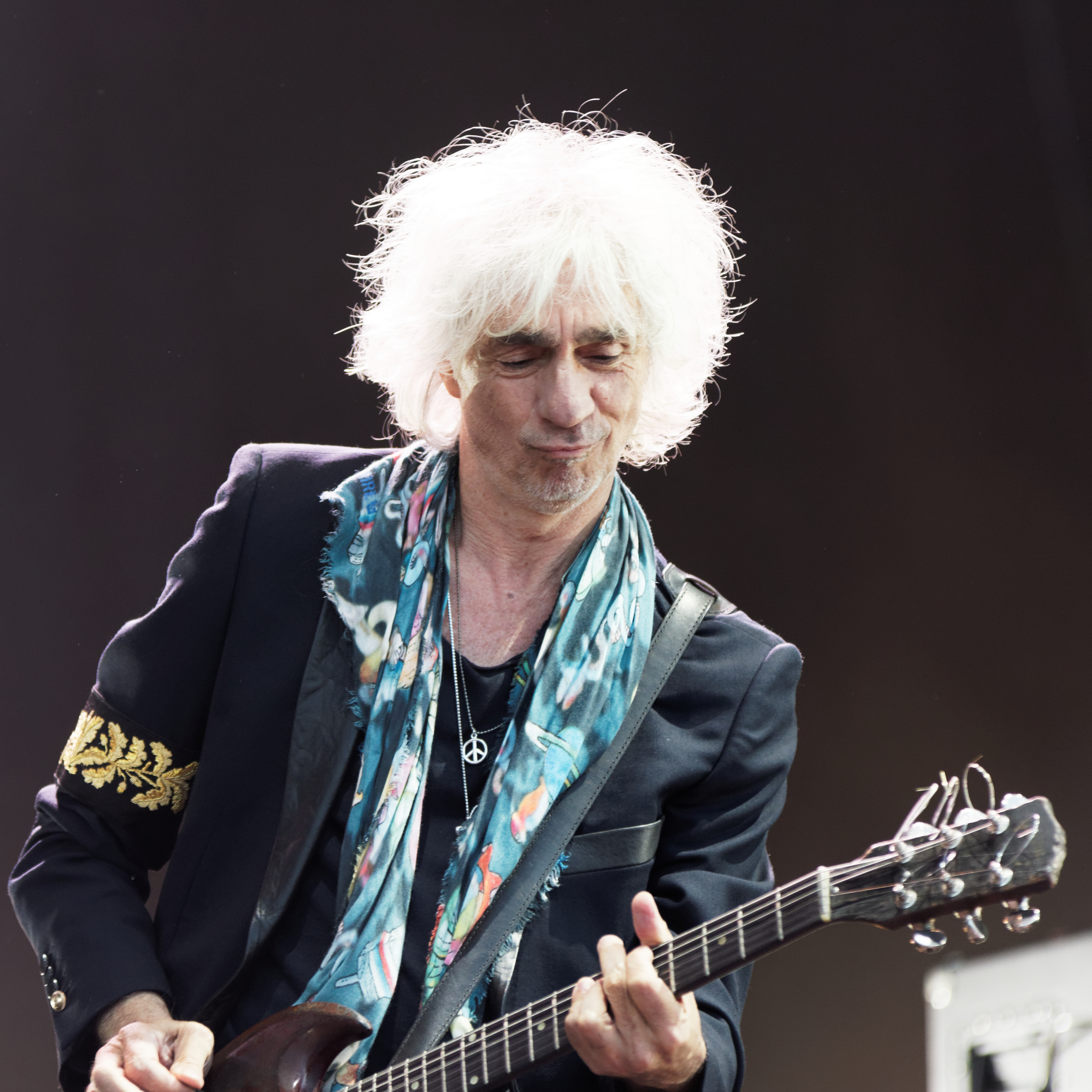
- Bertignac performing in 2016

Background information
- Born: Louis Laurent Bertignac; 23 February 1954 (age 72); Oran, French Algeria
- Genres: Rock
- Occupations: Musician; songwriter
- Instruments: Guitar; vocals
- Years active: 1973–present
- Formerly of: Téléphone; Shakin' Street; Bertignac et les Visiteurs
- Website: bertignac.com

Louis Laurent Bertignac (French pronunciation: [lwi lɔʁɑ̃ bɛʁtiɲak]; born 23 February 1954) is a French guitarist, vocalist and songwriter. An ex Shakin' Street member and a founding member in 1976 of the rock band Téléphone, he formed Bertignac et les Visiteurs after Téléphone split in 1986. Tony Visconti produced his first solo album, Elle et Louis (1993) and Chris Kimsey the second, '96.

In 2004, he produced, arranged and played guitar on the debut album by Carla Bruni, Quelqu'un m'a dit. Bruni in turn contributed lyrics to 10 of the 12 songs on Bertignac's 2005 album Longtemps.

He performed at Live 8 at the Palace of Versailles on 2 July 2005. He appears as an actor in Highlander III: The Sorcerer in 1994.

== Discography ==
=== with Téléphone ===
- Téléphone (1977)
- Crache Ton Venin (1979)
- Téléphone public (1980)
- Au Cœur de la Nuit (1980)
- Dure Limite (1982)
- Un autre monde (1984)
- Téléphone Le Live (1986)
- Paris '81 (2000)

=== with Bertignac et les Visiteurs ===
- Louis Bertignac et les Visiteurs (1987)
- Rocks (1990)

=== Solo ===
- Elle et Louis (1993)
- Le Médiator (live) (1993)
- 96 (1996)
- Bertignac live (live) (1998)
- Longtemps (2005)
- Live Power Trio (2006)
- Suis-moi (2014)
