= 2016 NRJ Music Awards =

- Date: November 12, 2016
- Location: Palais des Festivals; Cannes, France
- Country: France
- Hosted by: Nikos Aliagas
- Most awards: (France) Amir (2) (United Kingdom) Coldplay (2) (Canada) Justin Bieber (2)
- Most nominations: (France) Jain (3)
- Website: http://www.nrj.fr/music-awards

Television/radio coverage
- Network: TF1 / NRJ
- Runtime: 148 minutes

The 2016 NRJ Music Awards was the 18th edition of the NRJ Music Awards, which took place on November 12, 2016, at the Palais des Festivals, in Cannes, France. The ceremony was broadcast live, but with a 5 to 15-minute delay due to terrorist threats, on TF1 and NRJ, and hosted by Nikos Aliagas.

== Performances ==
Artist	Song
Bruno Mars	"24K Magic"
Christophe Maé	"Il est où le Bonheur"
Robbie Williams	"Supreme" "Party Like a Russian"
Kendji Girac	"Les Yeux de la mama" "Andalouse" "Sonrisa"
Coldplay	"Everglow"
Enrique Iglesias feat. Wisin	"Duele el Corazón" "Tired of Being Sorry"
Maître Gims feat. Niska	"Sapés comme jamais"
Louane	"Jour 1" "Nos secrets"
M. Pokora	"Bélinda" "Cette année-là"
Charlie Puth	"See You Again" "Marvin Gaye" "We Don't Talk Anymore"
Kids United	"On écrit sur les murs"
Soprano	"Le diable ne s'habille plus en Prada"
Amir	"J'ai cherché"
Charlie Puth feat. Louane	"Imagine"
Twenty One Pilots	"Ride"
Tal	"Are We Awake"
Jain	"Come"
Jenifer	"Au soleil" "Ma révolution" "Mourir dans tes yeux"

== Winners and nominees ==
The winners were revealed on November 12, 2016.

Francophonic Male Artist (presented by (France) Jenifer and (United Kingdom) Robbie Williams)	Francophonic Female Artist (presented by (France) Jérôme Commandeur and (Germany) Alicia Endemann)
(France) Soprano; (France) Black M; (France) Christophe Maé; (France) Julien Doré; (France) Kendji Girac; (Democratic Republic of the Congo) Maître Gims	(France) / (Israel) Tal; (Canada) Céline Dion; (France) Imany; (France) Jenifer; (France) Louane; (Algeria) Zaho
International Male Artist (presented by (France) Tony Yoka and (France) Estelle Mossely)	International Female Artist (presented by (Argentina) Martina Stoessel)
(Canada) Justin Bieber; (United States) Charlie Puth; (Canada) Drake; (Spain) Enrique Iglesias; (United States) Justin Timberlake; (Canada) The Weeknd	(Australia) Sia; (United Kingdom) Adele; (United States) Beyoncé; (Barbados) Rihanna; (United States) Lady Gaga; (Colombia) Shakira
Francophonic Breakthrough Act (presented by (France) Laetitia Milot and (France) Soprano)	International Breakthrough Act (presented by (France) Hatem Ben Arfa) and (France) Ingrid Chauvin)
(France) Amir; (France) Claudio Capéo; (France) Jain; (France) Jul; (France) Ridsa; (France) Slimane	(United States) Twenty One Pilots; (United States) Fifth Harmony; (Denmark) Lukas Graham; (United States) Mike Posner; (United States) The Chainsmokers; (Sweden) Zara Larsson
Francophonic Group / Duo (presented by (France) Élie Semoun and (France) Laurent Baffie)	International Group / Duo (presented by (France) Ilona Smet and (United Kingdom) Julian Perretta)
(France) Fréro Delavega; (France) Kids United; (France) L.E.J; (France) Les 3 Mousquetaires; (Democratic Republic of the Congo) Maître Gims feat. (France) Jul	(United Kingdom) Coldplay; (United Kingdom) Calvin Harris feat. (Barbados) Rihanna; (Spain) Enrique Iglesias feat. (United States) Pitbull; (United Kingdom) / (United States) Major Lazer; (Australia) Sia feat. (Jamaica) Sean Paul
Video of the Year (presented by (France) Jarry and (France) Imany)	DJ of the Year (presented by (France) Manuela Diaz and (France) M.Pokora)
(France) Christophe Maé - "Il est où le Bonheur"; (United Kingdom) Adele - "Hello"; (United Kingdom) Coldplay - "Up&Up"; (France) Jain - "Come"; (France) Julien Doré - "Le lac"; (Barbados) Rihanna feat. (Canada) Drake - "Work"	(France) David Guetta; (France) DJ Snake; (France) Feder; (France) Kungs; (Norway) / (Singapore) Kygo; (Netherlands) Martin Garrix
French Song of the Year (presented by (France) Sylvie Tellier and (France) Christophe Licata)	International Song of the Year (presented by (France) Florent Peyre and (Algeria) Zaho)
(France) Amir - "J'ai cherché"; (France) Jain - "Come"; (France) Christophe Maé - "Il est où le Bonheur"; (Democratic Republic of the Congo) Maître Gims - "Sapés comme Jamais"; (France) Soprano - "Le Diable ne s'habille plus en Prada"	(Canada) Justin Bieber - "Love Yourself"; (Spain) Enrique Iglesias - "Duele el Corazón"; (France) David Guetta feat. (Sweden) Zara Larsson - "This One's for You"; (United Kingdom) Julian Perretta - "Miracle"; (Australia) Sia feat. (Jamaica) Sean Paul - "Cheap Thrills"; (United States) Justin Timberlake - "Can't Stop the Feeling!"
Award of Merit
(United States) Bruno Mars; (United Kingdom) Coldplay; (Spain) Enrique Iglesias
