= List of awards and nominations received by Jain =

Jain awards and nominations
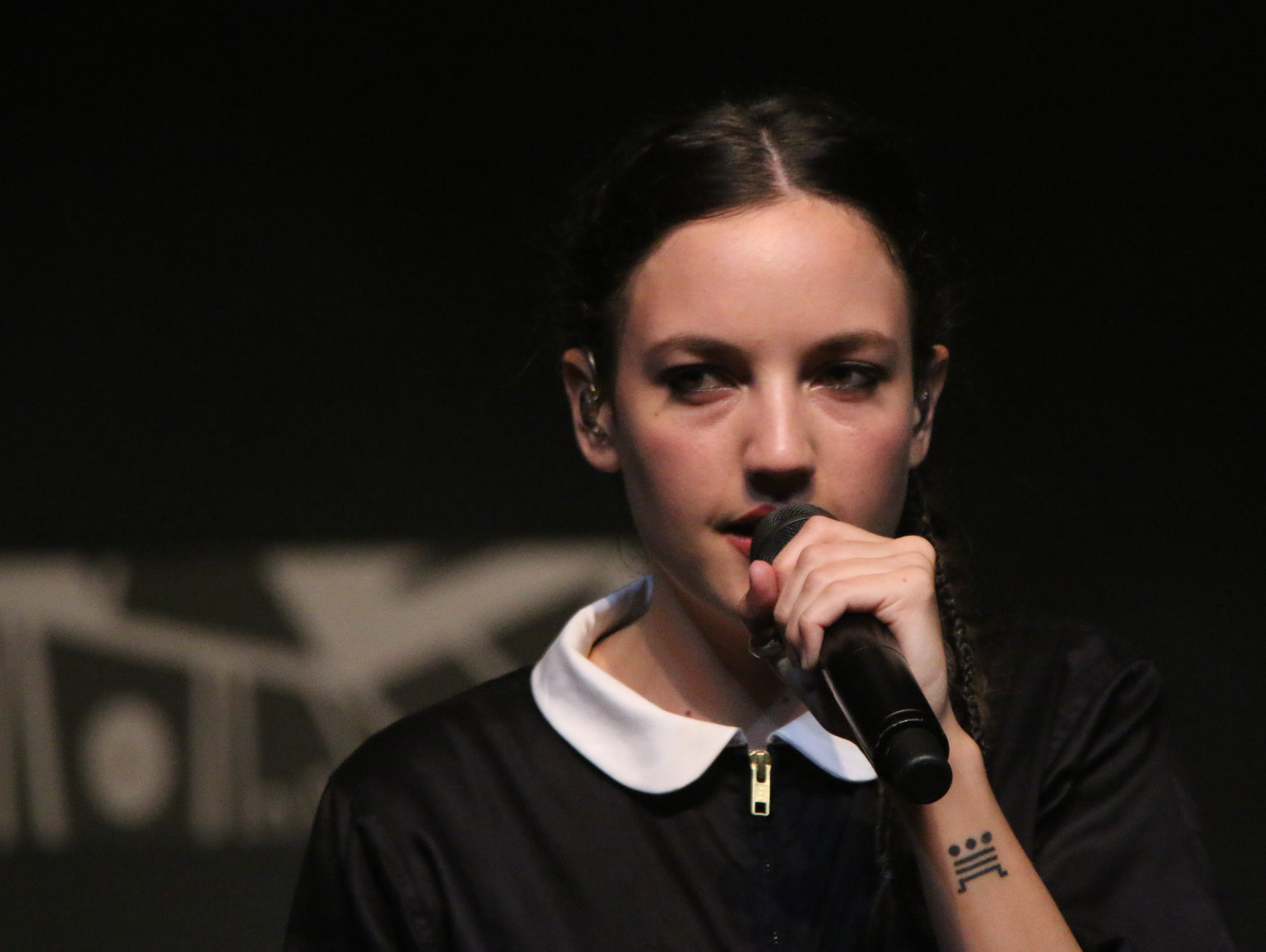
- Jain in 2016
Awards and nominations
Award	Wins	Nominations
European Border Breakers Awards	1	1
Grammy Awards	0	1
MTV Europe Music Awards	0	1
NRJ Music Awards	2	5
Prix Talents W9	1	1
Victoires de la Musique	2	5

Totals (Note: Certain award groups do not simply award one winner. They acknowledge several different recipients, have runners-up, and have third place. Since this is a specific recognition and is different from losing an award, runner-up mentions are considered wins in this award tally. For simplification and to avoid errors, each award in this list has been presumed to have had a prior nomination.)
- Wins: 6
- Nominations: 13

Jeanne Galice, known professionally as Jain, is a French singer-songwriter.

During her career, Jain has won several awards, including two Victoire awards, an Electronic Dance Music Award, a European Border Breakers Award and was nominated for a Grammy.

== Berlin Music Video Awards ==
The Berlin Music Video Awards is a festival that promotes the art of music videos.

Year	Nominated	Award	Result
2023	THE FOOL	Best VFX	Nominated

== Electronic Dance Music Awards ==
The Electronic Dance Music Awards (also known as the EDMAs) is an annual music award show focusing on electronic dance music.

Year	Nominated work	Award	Result	Ref.
2024	Makeba (Ian Asher Remix)	Remix of the Year	Won	

== European Border Breakers Awards ==
The European Border Breakers Award is an annual prize awarded to ten emerging artists or groups who reached audiences outside their own countries with their first internationally released album in the past year.

Year	Nominated	Award	Result	Ref.
2017	Jain	Best French Act	Won	

== Grammy Awards ==
A Grammy Award is an award presented by The Recording Academy to recognize achievement in the music industry.

Year	Nominated	Award	Result	Ref.
2017	Makeba	Best Music Video	Nominated	

== MTV Europe Music Awards ==
An MTV Europe Music Award is an award presented by Viacom International Media Networks to honour artists and music in pop culture.

Year	Nominated	Award	Result	Ref.
2017	Jain	Best French Act	Nominated	

== NRJ Music Awards ==
NRJ Music Awards is an annual French award ceremony presented by the French radio station NRJ to honor the best in the French and worldwide music industry.

Year	Nominated	Award	Result	Ref.
2016	Jain	Francophone Breakthrough of the Year	Nominated	
2016	Come	Francophone Song of the Year	Nominated	
2016	Come	Music Video of the Year	Nominated	
2017	Jain	Francophone Female Artist of the Year	Nominated	
2018	Jain	Francophone Female Artist of the Year	Won	
2018	Alright	Music Video of the Year	Nominated	

== Prix Talents W9 ==
The Prix Talents W9 is annual French music awards, organized by the W9 television channel.

Year	Nominated	Award	Result	Ref.
2016	Jain	Jury Prize	Won	

== Victoires de la Musique ==
Victoires de la Musique is an annual French award ceremony where the Victoire accolade is delivered by the French Ministry of Culture to recognize outstanding achievement in the music industry that recognizes the best musical artists of the year.

Year	Nominated	Award	Result	Ref.
2016	Zanaka	Album Révélation of the Year	Nominated	
2017	Jain	Female Artist of the Year	Won	
2017	Makeba	Music Video of the Year	Won	
2017	Zanaka Tour	Music Show, Tour or Concert of the Year	Nominated	
2019	Alright	Music Video of the Year	Nominated	
