= Jenifer fait son live =

Live album by Jenifer Bartoli
- Released: October 3, 2005
- Recorded: March 12 and 13, 2005
- Venue: Le Zénith, Paris
- Genre: Pop, pop rock, soul
- Length: 1h35
- Label: Universal, Mercury

Jenifer Bartoli chronology
Le Passage (2004)	Jenifer fait son live (2005)	Lunatique (2007)

Jenifer fait son live is the name of the first live album recorded by French singer Jenifer Bartoli. It was recorded during Jenifer's first live tour at Zenith in Paris, on March 12 and 13, 2005. The album contains a new version of "Serre-moi", a song available on Jenifer's previous album Le Passage. It was released on October 3, 2005 and was a success in France and Belgium (Wallonia), where it reached the top ten.

== Formats and track listing ==
CD album

#	Title	Length
1	"Ose"	5:53
2	"Comme un yo-yo"	5:06
3	"Le Passage"	3:34
4	"Le Souvenir de ce jour"	3:36
5	"Celle que tu vois"	4:42
6	"Donne-moi le temps"	4:23
7	"Chou boup"	3:34
8	"Pour toi"	3:57
9	"Au soleil"	4:06
10	"J'en ai assez"	3:04
11	"Des Mots qui résonnent!"	4:08
12	"Mauvais sang"	4:00
13	"De vous à moi"	2:56
14	"Je ne pourrai plus aimer"	4:09
15	"C'est de l'or"	5:12
16	"Dirty Man"	4:08
17	"J'attends l'amour"	4:15
18	"Ma Révolution"	4:54
19	"Serre-moi" (single mix)	3:23

CD 2

1. "Tom's Diner"
2. "Serre-moi"

DVD

The DVD contains the same track listing. It was released on November 9, 2005.

== Charts and sales ==
=== Weekly charts ===
Chart (2005)	Peak position
Belgian (Wallonia) Albums Chart	6
French Digital Chart	10
French Albums Chart	6
Swiss Albums Chart	77

=== Year-end charts ===
Chart (2005)	Position
Belgian (Wallonia) Albums Chart	68
French Albums Chart	114

=== Certifications ===
Region	Certification	Certified units/sales
France (SNEP)	Gold	100,000^{*}
^{*} Sales figures based on certification alone.
