= Marie Portolano =

French sports journalist (born 1985)

- Born: 2 November 1985 (age 40); Paris, France
- Occupations: Sports journalist, television presenter
- Years active: 2008–present
- Known for: TV host Télématin (2023–present)
- Television: Canal+ (2014–2021); M6 (2021–23); France 2
- Spouse: Grégoire Ludig (m. 2019)
- Children: 1

Marie Portolano (born 2 November 1985) is a French sports journalist and television presenter. She participated at the Canal Football Club from 2014 to 2018 and presented the program Canal Sports Club from 25 August 2018 to 6 March 2021.

== Early life and education ==
Marie Portolano was born in Paris. In 1998, her mother was named director of the company Gaz de Strasbourg. The family lived in the region of Alsace for two years. In that occasion, she went regularly at the Stade de la Meinau to support the RC Strasbourg Alsace. At age 19, she went for six months in South Africa at Cape Town. When she came back to France, she decided to pursue a career in journalism.

== Television career ==
Marie Portolano began her career in 2008 at LCI before joining Eurosport in early 2009. The same year, she also made an internship at Les Inrockuptibles. In 2010, she was hired to present the sports news on the channel Orange Sport Info. In July 2011, she presented journals of half an hour during the first and second part of the evening on the channel of the Ligue de Football Professionnel, CFoot.

At the ending of CFoot in May 2012, she was hired by the channel of Al Jazeera Sport France, BeIN Sports, where she co-hosted Lunch Time from Monday to Thursday with Darren Tulett and Le Grand Stade with Mary Patrux. In February 2014, she hosted alone Sports à la Une on Sunday on the same channel, a program about the weekly sports news, but that also proposes the pre-game of the Ligue 1 at the early afternoon.

She then presented from 2015 to 2017 the program Jour de foot, the first woman to present this historical program on Canal+ since Nathalie Iannetta. In addition of her programs about soccer, Canal+ offered her a season debut in 2015 on the presentation of Fight + Le Mag, a weekly program dedicated to fight sports and broadcast every Tuesday on Canal+ Sport. In November 2015, she became a columnist on the program Touche pas à mon sport ! on D8 presented by Estelle Denis.

During the UEFA Euro 2016, she regularly participated at the program 20h Foot broadcast on i-Télé. From September 2016 to June 2017, she presented on Friday the evening program 19h30 Sport broadcast live and in public on Canal+ Sport. On 10 March 2017, the program was renamed 19H30 Sport and ended in June 2017.

In September 2017, she presented with Hervé Mathoux and Benjamin Castaldi, the great concert celebrating the obtention of the 2024 Summer Olympics to Paris. Taking place at the forecourt of the Hôtel de Ville, it was retransmitted live and simultaneously on C8 and RFM.

After four seasons of Canal Football Club on Canal+, Marie Portolano left the program in 2018 to present Canal Sports Club, an all-sports program broadcast on Saturday evening on the same channel. In June and July 2019, she presented with Karim Bennani the program L'Info du sport, broadcast every evening on Canal+, about the 2019 FIFA Women's World Cup for one hour, but also the other sports news.

On 25 November 2020, a "Tribune against violence" imagined by the Ligue de Football Professionnel, in which she participated, is published at the occasion of the International Day for the Elimination of Violence against Women. Marie Portolano made a documentary about sexism in sports journalism entitled Je ne suis pas une salope, je suis une journaliste and broadcast on 21 March 2021 on Canal+. She gives the floor to several of her colleagues, including Clémentine Sarlat, Estelle Denis, Isabelle Ithurburu, Cécile Grès, Nathalie Iannetta, Charlotte Namura and Laurie Delhostal, to evoke the place of women in sports journalism and the presence of sexism in the redactions.

In March 2021, Marie Portolano left Canal+ to join M6. She presented the same year the tenth season of the pastry contest Le Meilleur Pâtissier (French version of The Great British Bake Off).

== Personal life ==
Marie Portolano has a son named James, born on New Year's Eve of 2014. In April 2017, she confirmed her relationship with French actor, comic and producer Grégoire Ludig, on the stage of the program Il en pense quoi Camille ? on C8. Marie Portolano and Grégoire Ludig married in June 2019.
