= Souldier =

Studio album by Jain
- Released: 24 August 2018
- Recorded: Spookland, Paris
- Genres: Pop; dance-pop; worldbeat
- Length: 31:12
- Labels: Spookland, Columbia, Sony Music
- Producers: Jain, Yodelice

Jain chronology
Zanaka (2015)	Souldier (2018)	The Fool (2023)

Singles from Souldier
- 1. "Alright" Released: 25 May 2018; 2. "Oh Man" Released: 8 October 2018

Souldier is the second studio album by French singer-songwriter Jain. It was released on 24 August 2018 through Spookland, Columbia and Sony Music. Its release was preceded by the lead single "Alright". The album's title is a play-on-words between 'soldier' and 'soul'.

The album debuted at number one in France and the French-speaking part of Switzerland (Romandie), number two in Switzerland and at number three in Wallonia. Jain toured North America in support of the album, beginning in October 2018, followed by dates in western Europe in November and December 2018. The tour will continue in France in spring 2019.

== Release and promotion ==
The album's title, cover and track listing were announced on 29 June 2018 and it was made available for pre-order.

On 25 May 2018, "Alright" was released as the album's lead single. A music video for the song was released on 25 June 2018. The song achieved considerable success in France, reaching number one on the downloads chart and number six on the overall singles chart. In December 2018, it was certified platinum in France for sales exceeding 200,000 copies. "Alright" was also highly successful in Walloon, where it peaked at number two on the singles chart.

On 8 October 2018, "Oh Man" was released as the album's second single. A music video for the song was released on 21 December 2018. It was filmed at the Museu Nacional d'Art de Catalunya. The song peaked at number 23 in France and was certified gold for sales exceeding 100,000 copies. In Walloon, it peaked at number 9, becoming Jain's third single to reach the top 10 in the region.

== Themes ==
The title track was inspired by the Orlando nightclub shooting, while the song "Star" is about the position of young women in the music industry.

== Critical reception ==
Professional ratings
Review scores
Source	Rating
NME	4/5 stars

Reviewing the album for NME, Thomas Smith awarded the album four out of five stars and complimented its "diverse palette of influences" and "endearing moments", including "Inspecta", with Smith naming it "one of the most exhilarating songs of 2018" that is "basically just the Inspector Gadget theme tune given a trendy trap makeover". Smith also acclaimed "Alright" for its "drum'n'bass with an Afrobeat flair". He also singled out "Dream", calling it "stripped-back Euro-tinged pop that's hinged on Jain's piercing vocals." In conclusion, he stated "Fortune favours the ones with love in their hearts, and Jain's Souldier shows bagfuls."

Will Hermes, writing for Rolling Stone, noted Jain's "flow jump-cutting between pan-African dancehall chat and Europop chirp with matter-of-fact fluency — think M.I.A. as ingénue". He called the album "another sly charmer, sung in English but stylistically polyglot".

== Track listing ==
All tracks are written by Jain.

No.	Title	Length
1.	"On My Way"	3:23
2.	"Flash (Pointe-Noire)"	2:19
3.	"Alright"	3:42
4.	"Oh Man"	3:22
5.	"Inspecta"	3:05
6.	"Dream"	3:04
7.	"Star"	3:01
8.	"Feel It"	2:39
9.	"Abu Dhabi"	2:51
10.	"Souldier"	3:46
Total length:		31:12

Japan bonus tracks
No.	Title	Length
11.	"Come"	2:44
12.	"Makeba"	4:11
Total length:		38:26

== Charts ==
=== Weekly charts ===
Chart (2018)	Peak position
Belgian Albums (Ultratop Flanders)	152
Belgian Albums (Ultratop Wallonia)	3
French Albums (SNEP)	1
Swiss Albums (Schweizer Hitparade)	2
Swiss Albums (Romandie)	1

=== Year-end charts ===
Chart (2018)	Position
Belgian Albums (Ultratop Wallonia)	83
French Albums (SNEP)	45

Chart (2019)	Position
Belgian Albums (Ultratop Wallonia)	164
French Albums (SNEP)	76

== Certifications ==
Region	Certification	Certified units/sales
France (SNEP)	2× Platinum	200,000^{‡}
^{‡} Sales+streaming figures based on certification alone.
