= Enzo Genton =

French footballer (born 2006)

Personal information
- Date of birth: 31 March 2006 (age 20)
- Place of birth: Ploemeur, France
- Height: 1.88 m (6 ft 2 in)
- Position: Centre-back

Team information
- Current team: Amiens (on loan from Lorient)
- Number: 25

Youth career
- 2011–2014: CS Honfleur
- 2014–2023: Lorient

Senior career*
| Years | Team | Apps | (Gls) |
| 2023– | Lorient B | 31 | (3) |
| 2024– | Lorient | 6 | (1) |
| 2025–2026 | → Rouen (loan) | 26 | (0) |
| 2026– | → Amiens (loan) | 2 | (0) |

International career^{‡}
| 2024 | France U19 | 3 | (0) |
- * Club domestic league appearances and goals as of 5 September 2026 ‡ National team caps and goals as of 08:36, 29 April 2025 (UTC)

Enzo Genton (born 31 March 2006) is a French professional footballer who plays as a centre-back for Ligue 3 club Amiens on loan from Ligue 1 club Lorient.

== Club career ==
Born in Plomeur, Brittany, Genton joined the youth academy of Lorient in the under-9 age group. He made his Ligue 2 debut for the club in the 2024–25 season. On 27 September 2024, he scored his first professional goal for the club, an acrobatic volley from a corner kick that capped off a 3–0 win over Ajaccio. On 5 March 2025, Genton signed his first professional contract with Lorient.

On 21 July 2025, Genton was loaned by Rouen in Championnat National.

== International career ==
Genton is a France youth international, making his debut for the under-19s in September 2024.

== Personal life ==
Enzo's father Benjamin Genton is a former professional footballer, while his uncle Florian Genton is a sports journalist.

== Honours ==
Lorient

- Ligue 2: 2024–25
