= Ma révolution =

Single by Jenifer Bartoli

from the album Le Passage
- B-side: "Qui ment"
- Released: April 2004
- Recorded: The Aerosol Grey Machine, Vollsjö; KBros Studio, Stockholm; Studio Ramsès 2, Paris; Westlake Audio, Los Angeles
- Genre: Pop, rock
- Length: 3:33 (album version); 3:12 (single version)
- Label: Mercury, Universal
- Songwriters: Andreas Karlegård (lyrics); Martin Karlegård (music); Katia Landreas (adaptation)
- Producers: Andreas Karlegård; Martin Karlegård

Jenifer Bartoli singles chronology
| "Donne-moi le temps" (2003) | "Ma révolution" (2004) | "Le Souvenir de ce jour" (2004) |

"Ma révolution" is the name of a 2004 song, the fifth single released by the French singer Jenifer Bartoli, and the first one from her second studio album Le Passage, on which it features as first track. It was the more successful song from it, reaching the top ten in France and Belgium (Wallonia).

== Song information ==
This song is actually a French-language adaptation of I'Dees' song "Black Coffee And A Stranger". It was also performed during Jenifer's first tour, and was thus included on the live album Jenifer fait son live (18th track). The song was dedicated to the singer's son and the music video was shot in Paris in April 2004. The B-side of the CD single, "Qui ment", was an unreleased song that was not available on Jenifer's first album.

In France, the single entered at a peak of number nine on 6 June 2004 and reached this position another time. It dropped slowly on the chart and remained for three weeks in the top ten, 17 weeks in the top 50 and 22 weeks in the top 100. It featured at number 44 on the End of the Year Chart.

In Belgium, the single charted for 13 weeks, from 19 June 2004. It started at number 17 and peaked at number nine, totalling ten weeks in the top 20. It was the 38th best-selling single of 2004.

The song also featured for 13 weeks in the Swiss Singles Chart. After a debut at number 45 on 20 June, it jumped to a peak at number 21, then dropped rather quickly on the chart.

== Track listings ==
- CD single
1. "Ma révolution" (single version) — 3:12
2. "Qui ment" (Tristan Leroy/Maxim Nucci) — 3:21
- CD single - Digipack
1. "Ma révolution" — 3:12
2. "Qui ment" — 3:21
3. "Ma révolution" (video)
- Digital download
1. "Ma révolution" — 3:12
2. "Ma révolution" (2005 live version) — 4:54

== Credits ==
=== Production ===
"Ma révolution"

- Produced by Andreas Karlegård & Martin Karlegård for KBros
- Engineered by KBros at The Aerosol Grey Machine, Vollsjö, KBros Studio, Stockholm, Studio Ramsès 2, Paris & Westlake Audio, Los Angeles

"Qui ment"

- Produced by Maxim Nucci
- Engineered at Studio Méga, Suresnes & Studio Plus XXX, Paris
- Mixed by Bob Clearmountain at Mix This!, Pacific Palisades
- Assistant mixing: Kevin Harp
- Mastered by Miles Showell at Metropolis Mastering, London

=== Design ===
- Azim Haidaryan: photography
- Barilla.design: cover design

== Charts ==
=== Peak positions ===
| Chart (2004) | Peak position |
|---|---|
| Belgian (Wallonia) Singles Chart | 9 |
| French Singles Chart | 9 |
| Swiss Singles Chart | 21 |

=== End of year charts ===
| End of year chart (2004) | Position |
|---|---|
| Belgian (Wallonia) Singles Chart | 38 |
| French Airplay Chart | 119 |
| French TV Music Videos Chart | 49 |
| French Singles Chart | 44 |
