= Karim Bennani (presenter) =

- Born: July 17, 1983 (age 42); Marseille (France)
- Citizenship: France
- Occupations: sports journalism, Television presenter, radio personality
- Years active: Since 2006
- Employer: RMC (France) (2006-2012)

Karim Bennani, born on July 17, 1983, in Marseille, is a French radio host and sports journalist.

== Biography ==
Born in Marseille to Moroccan parents, Karim Bennani attended the Studec radio school in Paris to achieve his dream of working in radio. On October 26, 2006, he began his career as the host of Kop RMC, an online chat show for listeners of After Foot. Through his appearances on the program, he eventually became one of its regular hosts under the pseudonym Karim. At the same time, he collaborated with Eurosport.

On June 2, 2008, Bennani hosted Luis Attaque with Luis Fernandez, from Monday to Thursday between 4 PM and 6 PM. He was a replacement for Florian Genton, who was banned from the air.

During the summer of 2008, he commented on some matches on NT1 with Didier Roustan.

On April 25, 2009, Bennani became the host of Les Paris RMC, every Saturday morning from 10 AM to 12 PM, alongside Vincent Moscato, Rolland Courbis, and Luis Fernandez.

During the 2010 FIFA World Cup in South Africa, Bennani was one of the special correspondents for RMC Sport.

On August 23, 2010, he no longer hosted Luis Attaque. He presented the sports news on BFM TV every evening from Friday to Sunday.

In October 2011, he was appointed deputy head of the TV division at RMC Sport.

In April 2012, after six years with NextRadioTV, Bennani joined beIN Sport.

In July 2013, he left beIN Sport to join Canal+ and host Jour de Foot with Éric Besnard and Reynald Pedros, as well as Formula One, le magazine de la F1. He occasionally replaced Hervé Mathoux on Les Spécialistes. In 2014, he abandoned presenting Formula One to focus on Jour de Foot, and in 2015, he left Jour de Foot to host L'Équipe du dimanche.

In August 2016, he was part of Canal+'s coverage for the Olympic Games in Rio. He handled transitions between Olympic events on Canal+ Sport and Canal+ Décalé, which was renamed Canal+ Rio for the occasion.

In 2016, his show L'Équipe du dimanche was canceled. He then resumed hosting Jour de Foot until the show's end in 2020. During the 2017-2018 season, he also presented 19H30 Sport every Monday at 7:30 PM on Canal+ Sport.

From June 10 to July 5, 2019, he co-hosted L'Info du Sport with Marie Portolano. The show, aired daily at 8 PM on Canal+, and provided an hour of coverage of the 2019 FIFA Women's World Cup football news and other sporting events.

In 2019-2020, he was a substitute for Mouloud Achour presenting the show Clique, broadcast from Monday to Friday between 7:55 PM and 9 PM on Canal+. In May 2020, he presented the overnight edition of CNews following the COVID-19 crisis and the stoppage of football leagues.

In 2020, after Jour de Foot was canceled, he joined the team for Canal Football Club, now broadcast on Saturdays and Sundays. In 2021, Bennani presented the Sunday multiplex at 3 PM with Grégory Sertic on Canal+ Sport.

In July 2021, Bennani was hired by Amazon to present the Sunday Ligue 1 multiplex and provide on-field commentary during matches. Starting in August, he also joined the new show L'Équipe de Greg, aired daily at 5:15 PM on L'Équipe. He appeared in the film Classico (2022), broadcast on Prime Video.

While continuing his activities on other channels, he joined Bonjour ! La Matinale TF1 in April 2024 as a replacement for Christophe Beaugrand's columnist role for a few days. After this experience, he was appointed on August 19, 2024 to the show with a news analysis segment without leaving his role in L'Équipe de Greg. Starting in October 2024, he also became the substitute host for the morning show Le 6/9 on LCI.
