= Alright (Jain song) =

2018 single by Jain

Single by Jain

from the album Souldier
- Released: 25 May 2018
- Genre: Pop
- Length: 3:42
- Label: Spookland; Columbia; Sony Music
- Songwriter: Jeanne Galice
- Producer: Yodelice

Jain singles chronology
"Dynabeat" (2016)	"Alright" (2018)	"Oh Man" (2018)

Music video
- "Alright" on YouTube

"Alright" is a song by French singer-songwriter Jain, released on 25 May 2018 as the lead single from her second studio album Souldier (2018). It was written by Jain and produced by Yodelice.

== Background ==
Jain wrote the song as a "hymn to independence". She has stated, "This song is built in a duality, like love stories... Both gentle and fierce, it highlights determination in the face of desolation. "Alright" speaks of love, in the broad sense, the one that lifts us up and pushes us forward."

== Critical reception ==
Thomas Smith of NME praised the song for its "drum'n'bass with an Afrobeat flair".

== Music video ==
The music video was filmed in Barcelona in May 2018 and released on 25 June 2018. Directed by Greg & Lio, it sees Jain and five other women freeing themselves from literal chains, represented by woollen threads, of their daily routines to do activities they enjoy. Jain wears a blue jumpsuit with red shoulder pads designed by agnès b. She engages in drifting and motorcycle riding, and is carried by doves as if she is growing wings.

== Charts ==
Chart (2018)	Peak position
Belgium (Ultratop 50 Wallonia)	2
France (SNEP)	6
Switzerland (Schweizer Hitparade)	38

== Certifications ==
Region	Certification	Certified units/sales
France (SNEP)	Diamond	333,333^{‡}
^{‡} Sales+streaming figures based on certification alone.
