= Mary Patrux =

French television presenter and sports journalist

- Born: 26 January 1979 (age 47); Lesquin, Nord, France
- Occupations: Sports journalist, television presenter
- Years active: 2004–present
- Known for: NBA Extra
- Television: Eurosport (2004–2009); L'Équipe TV (2009–2012); BeIN Sports (2012–present)

Mary Patrux (born 26 January 1979) is a French television presenter and sports journalist. She presents NBA Extra since 2013 on BeIN Sports, and participates on the events broadcast on the channel.

== Early life and education ==
Mary Patrux was born in Lesquin in the department of Nord to a commercial father and a direction secretary mother. She grew up in the Lille suburb and then moved with her family to Cergy-Pontoise in the Paris region. Her father, her grandfather and her uncle were basketball players, nevertheless she practiced several sports before playing basketball. She obtained her license at the age of eight in Franconville. She evolved during all her childhood as a small forward and participated at detections at the INSEP. She acquired a reputation of a scorer, and conserved a certain admiration for players like Stephen Curry.

After three years at the Notre-Dame de la Compassion high school in Pontoise where she obtained an economic and social baccalauréat, she joined the Institut catholique de Paris from 1997 to 1999, and pursued with a degre in history at the Sorbonne Nouvelle University from 1999 to 2002. Having decided to become a sports journalist when she knew that she will not become a professional basketball player, she multiplied in parallel the internships passing by Ouest-France, BFM Radio, RTL, Infosport+, as well as the Ministry for Europe and Foreign Affairs. Consequently, she joined the Institut Pratique du Journalisme (IPJ) from 2002 to 2004, where she graduated.

== Television career ==
=== 2004–2009 : Beginnings on Eurosport ===
In 2004, while student in second year of journalism, Mary Patrux did an end-of-year internship at Eurosport. She began covering the 2004 Summer Olympics. First presenting the information bulletins live, she then completed with comments and presented reports at the occasion of special events. She stayed at Eurosport the following year. She multiplied the covered sports by notably doing field edge and presenting on stage.

=== 2009–2012 : Presenter on L'Équipe TV ===
After five years at Eurosport, Mary Patrux joined in September 2009 L'Équipe TV to present La matinale week-end. Three months later, she presented Forum l'Équipe, a weekly program where she meets sportsmen such as Nikola Karabatic, Alain Boghossian, Laura Flessel, Tony Parker and even Jean Alesi. She also presented Week-end Live.

=== 2012–present : Presenter on BeIN Sports ===
In early 2012, Charles Biétry proposed her to join BeIN Sports, still on project. Mary Patrux participated at the construction of the channel intervening on the hiring, the program schedule and even the choice of the program names. She appeared the day of the official launch of the channel five months after her arrival. She presented during the year the programs the Euroshow and Le Grand Stade in company of Darren Tulett then of Marie Portolano for the second the year after.

In 2013, Mary Patrux began presenting NBA Extra, a daily program about the news of the NBA. The consultant Jacques Monclar stated that she was a "good compromise between good mood and professionalism". She also treated on the air two other sports than basketball, which include handball with among others the world championships, the Europe championships, the trophies of the Ligue nationale de handball, and swimming. She participated more generally at big events like the Olympic Games and the tennis Grand Slams.

In 2019, Mary Patrux was approached by the sports direction of France Télévisions to replace Flore Maréchal on presenting Tout le sport, co-hosting Stade 2 and intervening at the events, but the transfer did not happen and she finally stayed on BeIN Sports, still presenting NBA Extra and big events.

== Personal life ==
Mary Patrux is married to Olivier Canton, rugby journalist on Eurosport. They have two children, a daughter named Louise and a son named Paul.
