= Le souvenir de ce jour =

"Le Souvenir de ce jour"

Single by Jenifer Bartoli

from the album Le Passage
- B-side: "Un cri d'amour"; "What If"
- Released: September 2004
- Recorded: The Aerosol Grey Machine, Vollsjö; KBros Studio, Stockholm; Studio Ramsès 2, Paris; Westlake Audio, Los Angeles
- Genre: Pop
- Length: 3:17 (album version); 3:25 (single version)
- Label: Mercury, Universal
- Songwriter(s): Benoît Poher (lyrics); Benoît Poher, Nicolas Chassagne, Florian Dubos (music)
- Producer(s): Andreas Karlegård, Martin Karlegård

Jenifer Bartoli singles chronology
"Ma Révolution" (2004)	"Le Souvenir de ce jour" (2004)	"C'est de l'or" (2004)

"Le Souvenir de ce jour" (English: "The Memory of This Day") is a 2004 song recorded by the French artist Jenifer Bartoli. It was released in September 2004 as the second single from her second studio album, Le Passage, on which it features as the second track. It is the second most successful single from this album in France and Belgium (Wallonia), behind the previous single, "Ma Révolution", although it had higher peak positions than this one.

== Song information ==
The two other tracks on the CD single were two new songs at the time. Composed by Benoît Poher, Florian Dubos and Nicolas Chassagne (who are members of the French band Kyo), "Le Souvenir de ce jour" was also performed on Jenifer's first tour and thus is available on the live album Jenifer fait son live, as the fourth track. It was also included on many compilations, such as Les plus belles ballades, NRJ Music Awards 2005, Hits 2004/2, Je t'aime and Hit for Teens.

In France, the single entered the chart on 26 September 2004, reached the top ten two weeks later and eventually peaked at number six in its fifth week. After that, it fell and totaled five weeks in the top ten, 17 weeks in the top 50 and 23 weeks in the top 100. It was ranked number 69 on the End of the Year Chart.

The single hit number seven on the Ultratop 50 (the Belgian chart) on 9 October 2004, after a debut at number 26 three weeks earlier. Then it dropped and fell off the chart after 14 weeks. It was number 86 on the Annual Chart of 2004.

== Track listings ==
- CD single
1. "Le Souvenir de ce jour" (single version) — 3:25
2. "Un Cri d'amour" (Andreas Karlegård/Martin Karlegård/adapt. Chet) — 2:36
3. "What If" (Lisa Miskovsky) — 4:02
- Digital download
1. "Le Souvenir de ce jour" (single version) — 3:25
2. "Le Souvenir de ce jour" (2005 live version) — 3:36

== Credits ==
=== Design ===
- Azim Haidaryan: photography
- Barilla.design: cover design

== Charts ==
=== Peak positions ===
Chart (2004)	Peak position
Belgian (Wallonia) Singles Chart	7
French Singles Chart	6
Swiss Singles Chart	27

=== End of year charts ===
End of year chart (2004)	Position
Belgian (Wallonia) Singles Chart	86
French Singles Chart	69
