= Bureau d'Accueil et d'Accompagnement des Migrants =

French migrant-aid association

The Bureau d'Accueil et d'Accompagnement des Migrants (Migrants welcoming and support office) (BAAM) is a French association created in 2015 in Paris to help migrants, particularly refugees and asylum-seekers. It was created after the expulsion of nearly 900 refugees from the high school building they were occupying, in the 19th arrondissement of Paris. The BAAM provides daily support to refugees, asylum-seekers and migrants (French language courses, support with administrative processes... ) but also cultural activities and alerts public opinion and politics in order to improve migrants welcoming in France.

== Organization ==
The Bureau d'Accueil et d'Accompagnement des Migrants was created in 2015 by collectives of informal support and activists after the expulsion of refugees who were occupying the Lycée Jean Quarré in Paris. The BAAM is a non-profit association under the French law of 1901, with about 500 members. The BAAM considers itself as a collective which does not act on a humanitarian basis but on a political solidarity.

The decision-making is collective and the administrative board is composed of 20 persons: 10 French and 10 migrants (Eritrean, Afghan, Sudanese, Libyan). The association is based in Paris but extensions in other cities are planned

== Support actions ==
The BAAM provides several services to support refugees, asylum-seekers and migrants, among which a legal advice service, social assistance, support in employment search and French language courses. The association also operates and supports refugees, asylum-seekers and migrants in camps and occupied places.

== Advocacy ==
=== The French Asylum and Immigration Law (Loi Asile Immigration) ===
The BAAM was at the origin of an important citizen mobilization against the 'Loi Collomb' (Asylum and Immigration Law). The association sensitizes people in the street by sharing asylum-seekers' experiences and organizes demonstrations to contest the repressive impact of the law.

=== LGBT+ Refugees ===
The BAAM's campaign 'Asile, clichés et LGBT' (Asylum, clichés and LGBT) aims at increasing awareness on the situation of LGBT+ refugees and the prejudices they are suffering from.

== Cultural actions ==
=== Cultural centre ===
In the cultural centre of the BAAM, volunteers organize different workshops (yoga, theatre, music, drawing, etc.) and artistic projects opened to migrants, to create social links and prevent isolation.

=== BAAM Theatre ===
Theatre workshops are regularly organized by the BAAM. They gather refugees, asylum-seekers and migrants who choose subjects (e.g. freedom), write texts and work with professionals to produce and perform the plays. They created and publicly performed a one hour act.

=== BAAM Migrants festival ===
To increase visibility and raise funds for supporting actions, the BAAM organizes a festival, of which, the first edition will take place on September 7, 2019. Celebrities including Nekfeu, sponsor of the association, the rapper Youssoupha and the singer Jain will perform at this occasion.
