= Jenifer (album) =

Studio album by Jenifer Bartoli
- Released: March 2002 (France); November 2002 (reissue); July 2003 (Spain)
- Recorded: December 2001/ January 2002; Studio Plus XXX, Paris; Studio Davout, Paris; Studio Ferber, Paris
- Genre: Pop, pop rock, soul
- Label: Universal, Island, Mercury
- Producer: Jean-François Berger, François Delabrière, Christophe Deschamps, Pierre Jaconelli, Laurent Marimbert, Nicolas Neidhardt, Vincent Perrot, Benjamin Raffaëlli, François Rause, Antoine Verlant

Jenifer Bartoli chronology
Jenifer (2002)	Le Passage (2004)

Singles from Jenifer
- 1. "J'attends l'amour" Released: April, 2002; 2. "Au soleil" Released: July 2002; 3. "Des Mots qui résonnent!" Released: November 12, 2002; 4. "Donne-moi le temps" Released: April 15, 2003

Jenifer is Jenifer Bartoli's début album, released in 2002 in France, and in February 2007 in the U.S. It achieved success on the French and Belgian charts, reaching the top two in both. It spawned four successful singles, all of which were top ten hits in Jenifer's native country. The album was recorded in a mere three weeks.

== Track listing ==
No.	Title	Writer(s)	Length
1.	"J'attends l'amour"	Johanna Demker	3:52
2.	"Au soleil"	Hocine Hallaf	3:39
3.	"Donne-moi le temps"	Pierre Lorain, So	3:38
4.	"Secrets défenses"	Christophe Deschamps, Jeanne Ermilova	3:50
5.	"Nos points communs"	Marc Lavoine, Georges Lunghini	3:56
6.	"Je garde" (with Mario)	Éric Dimicoli	3:03
7.	"Je ne pourrai plus aimer"	Pierre Lorain, François Rause, Antoine Verlant	3:37
8.	"Maintenant"	Frédéric Doll, Nicolas Neidhardt, Benjamin Raffaëlli	3:24
9.	"Là où tu rêves"	Benjamin Raffaëlli, Marie-Jo Zarb	4:03
10.	"Viens me voir"	Yorgos Benardos, Ingrid Roux	3:26
11.	"Que reste-t-il ?"	Essaï Altounian, Daniel Moyn	4:36
Total length:			41:39

Reissue
No.	Title	Writer(s)	Length
1.	"Des Mots qui résonnent!"	Patrick Johansson, Ian-Paolo Lira, Linus Nordén	3:25
2.	"Au soleil"	Hocine Hallaf	3:39
3.	"J'attends l'amour"	Johanna Demker	3:52
4.	"Je garde" (with Mario)	Éric Dimicoli	3:03
5.	"Nos points communs"	Marc Lavoine, Georges Lunghini	3:56
6.	"Entre humains"	Lisa Miskovsky	3:58
7.	"Je ne pourrai plus aimer"	Pierre Lorain, François Rause, Antoine Verlant	3:37
8.	"Donne-moi le temps" (Single version)	Pierre Lorain, So	3:38
9.	"Là où tu rêves"	Benjamin Raffaëlli, Marie-Jo Zarb	4:03
10.	"Secrets défenses"	Christophe Deschamps, Jeanne Ermilova	3:50
11.	"Viens me voir"	Yorgos Benardos, Ingrid Roux	3:26
12.	"Maintenant"	Frédéric Doll, Nicolas Neidhardt, Benjamin Raffaëlli	3:24
13.	"Que reste-t-il ?"	Essaï Altounian, Daniel Moyn	4:36
Total length:			48:27

Spanish edition
No.	Title	Writer(s)	Length
14.	"Junto al sol" (Au soleil)	Hocine Hallaf	3:40
15.	"Just Another Pop Song" (Des Mots qui résonnent!)	Patrick Johansson, Ian-Paolo Lira, Linus Nordén	3:25
Total length:			55:32

== Album credits ==
=== Personnel ===
- Angepier - keyboards, piano & programming ("Donne-moi le temps")
- Valérie Belinga - backing vocals ("Des mots qui résonnent!")
- Denis Benarrosh - percussion
- Jean-François Berger - string arrangement & conducting, keyboards & programming
- Bertrand Cervera - violin solo ("J'attends l'amour")
- Roland Chosson - French horn ("Donne-moi le temps")
- François Delabrière - additional guitar ("Nos points communs")
- Christophe Deschamps - drums & percussion
- Guillaume Eyango - backing vocals
- Dominique Grimaldi - bass guitar ("Donne-moi le temps")
- Pierre Jaconelli - guitar ("Donne-moi le temps" & "Secrets défenses")
- Cyrille Lacrouts - cello solo ("J'attends l'amour" & "Je garde")
- Murielle Lefebvre - backing vocals
- Laurent Marimbert - string arrangement & conducting, keyboards & programming
- Olivier Marly - guitar ("Je ne pourrai plus aimer")
- Nicolas Neidhardt - keyboards & programming
- Cyril Normand - French horn ("Donne-moi le temps")
- Vincent Perrot - keyboards & programming ("Secrets défenses")
- Benjamin Raffaëlli - guitar, keyboards & programming
- François Rause - guitar ("Je ne pourrai plus aimer")
- Stanislas Renoult - string arrangement & conducting ("Je ne pourrai plus aimer")
- Philippe Russo - guitar ("Nos points communs")
- Ian Thomas - drums ("Des mots qui résonnent!")
- Marine Trévillot - backing vocals ("Je ne pourrai plus aimer")
- Matthew Vaughan - programming ("Nos points communs")
- Laurent Vernerey - bass guitar
- Christophe Voisin - keyboards & programming ("Secrets défenses" & "Je ne pourrai plus aimer")

=== Production ===
- "J'attends l'amour", "Au soleil", "Maintenant" & "Viens me voir" produced by Nicolas Neidhardt & Benjamin Raffaëlli
- "Donne-moi le temps" produced by Pierre Jaconelli
- "Secrets défenses" produced by Christophe Deschamps & Vincent Perrot
- "Nos points communs" produced by Jean-François Berger & François Delabrière
- "Je garde" & "Que reste-t-il?" produced by Laurent Marimbert
- "Je ne pourrai plus aimer" produced by François Rause & Antoine Verlant
- "Là où tu rêves" & "Des mots qui résonnent!" produced by Benjamin Raffaëlli
- Engineered by Jean-Paul Gonnod at Studio Plus XXX, Paris
- Assistant engineers - Xavier Bleu, Pierrick Devin, Gérard Noël-Pierre, Nino
- Strings recorded by René Ameline at Studio Ferber, Paris
- Strings recorded by Stéphane Prin & Pete Schwier at Studio Davout, Paris
- Assistant engineers (strings) - Eymerick Castin (Studio Davout), Jeff Ginouvès & Benjamin Joubert (Studio Ferber)
- String contractors - Christophe Briquet, Dominique Rouits, Marylène Vinciguerra
- Additional recordings - Stéphane Briand, Nicolas Neidhardt, Pete Schwier at Aktion Entertainment, Studio Davout, Studio Guillaume Tell, Studio M49 & Studio Méga
- Pro Tools editing by Jean-Paul Gonnod & Mickaël Rangeard
- Mixed by François Delabrière at Studio Plus XXX
- Mixed by Steve Forward ("Que reste-t-il?")
- Assistant mixing - Xavier Bleu, Pierrick Devin ("Que reste-t-il?"), Nino
- Mastered by Tony Cousins at Metropolis Mastering, London
- Executive producer - Bertrand Lamblot

=== Design ===
- Michel Sedan: photography
- Happydesign: cover design

== Charts and sales ==
=== Weekly charts ===
Chart (2002)	Peak position
Belgian Albums (Ultratop Wallonia)	1
French Albums (SNEP)	2
Swiss Albums (Schweizer Hitparade)	9

=== Year-end charts ===
Chart (2002)	Position
Belgian Albums (Ultratop Wallonia)	11
French Albums (SNEP)	10
Swiss Albums (Schweizer Hitparade)	91

Chart (2004)	Position
French Albums (SNEP)	188

=== Certifications ===
Region	Certification	Certified units/sales
Belgium (BRMA)	Gold	25,000^{*}
France (SNEP)	Platinum	300,000^{*}
^{*} Sales figures based on certification alone.
