= Abu Dhabi (disambiguation) =

Abu Dhabi is the capital and the second most populous city of the United Arab Emirates, as well as the capital of the Emirate of Abu Dhabi.

Abu Dhabi may also refer to:

== Places ==
- Emirate of Abu Dhabi, emirate of the United Arab Emirates
- Abu Dhabi Central Capital District, the municipal region

== Music ==
- "Abu Dhabi" (Mikolas Josef song), a 2019 song by Czech singer Mikolas Josef
- "Abu Dhabi" (Jain song), 2018 song by Jain on the album Souldier

== See also ==
- Abu Dhabi International Airport, international airport in Abu Dhabi
- Ubbi dubbi
