= Zanaka =

Studio album by Jain
- Released: 6 November 2015
- Recorded: Spookland Studio, Paris
- Genre: Pop; dance-pop; progressive pop
- Length: 33:13 (standard edition); 54:35 (deluxe edition)
- Label: Spookland, Sony Music, Columbia
- Producer: Yodelice

Jain chronology
Zanaka (2015)	Souldier (2018)

Singles from Zanaka
- 1. "Come" Released: 11 May 2015; 2. "Makeba" Released: 6 November 2015; 3. "Dynabeat" Released: 10 July 2017

Zanaka is the first studio album by French singer-songwriter Jain, released on 6 November 2015. The album's title means "child" in Malagasy, and is a tribute to her mother who is of Franco-Malagasy origin.

A deluxe edition was released on 25 November 2016 adding six more songs, including the single "Dynabeat".

== Singles ==
=== Come ===
"Come" was released as the first single from Zanaka on 11 May 2015. A music video was uploaded to Jain's official YouTube channel on 2 June 2015. The song was later included on the Hope EP released on 22 June 2015. The song peaked at number one on the French singles chart and in November 2016 was certified Diamond. "Come" also reached number 18 on the French end of year singles chart in 2016.

The song has also been used in advertising by the Polish television channel Polsat and in 2017 was featured in the American horror comedy web television series Santa Clarita Diet.

=== Makeba ===
"Makeba" was first released as part of the Hope EP, in 2015. In September 2016, a lyric video was uploaded to Jain's official YouTube channel. A music video was later uploaded on 30 November 2016. The video was filmed in South Africa, the birthplace of the song's inspiration Miriam Makeba. The music video was nominated for Best Music Video at the 60th Annual Grammy Awards in 2018. The song peaked at number seven on the French singles chart and was certified gold in November 2016. Makeba reached number 93 in 2016 and number 161 in 2017 on the French end of year singles chart.

"Makeba" was used in the Levi's "Circles" television commercial. It was entered for Levi's by RCA Records in the 2018 Clio Awards, where it received the Bronze Medal for Best Use of Music.

=== Dynabeat ===
"Dynabeat" was released on the deluxe re-release of Zanaka on 25 November 2016. A music video was uploaded to Jain's official YouTube channel on 10 July 2017. The song peaked at number 98 on the French singles chart.

== Track listing ==
Standard edition
No.	Title	Length
1.	"Come"	2:42
2.	"Heads Up"	3:31
3.	"Mr Johnson"	3:03
4.	"Lil Mama" (Donovan Bennett, Jain, Sean Roberts)	2:38
5.	"Hope"	3:14
6.	"All My Days"	3:47
7.	"Hob"	2:25
8.	"Makeba"	4:09
9.	"You Can Blame Me"	3:45
10.	"So Peaceful"	3:59

Deluxe edition
No.	Title	Length
11.	"City"	3:16
12.	"Son of a Sun"	3:31
13.	"Dynabeat"	2:52
14.	"Come" (Extended version)	4:47
15.	"Come" (Femi Kuti remix)	2:48
16.	"Makeba" (Dirty Ridin' remix)	4:03

== Charts ==
=== Weekly charts ===
Weekly chart performance for Zanaka
Chart (2016–2023)	Peak position
French Albums (SNEP)	5
Belgian Albums (Ultratop Wallonia)	4
Belgian Albums (Ultratop Flanders)	95
Canadian Albums (Billboard)	51
Italian Albums (FIMI)	74
Lithuanian Albums (AGATA)	98
Spanish Albums (PROMUSICAE)	68
Swiss Albums (Schweizer Hitparade)	17

=== Year-end charts ===
Year-end chart performance for Zanaka
Chart (2016)	Position
French Albums (SNEP)	14

== Certifications ==
Certifications for Zanaka
Region	Certification	Certified units/sales
Canada (Music Canada)	Gold	40,000^{‡}
France (SNEP)	Diamond	500,000^{‡}
Poland (ZPAV)	Platinum	20,000^{‡}
Switzerland (IFPI Switzerland)	Gold	10,000^{^}
^{^} Shipments figures based on certification alone.^{‡} Sales+streaming figures based on certification alone.
