= Donne-moi le temps =

Single by Jenifer Bartoli

from the album Jenifer
- B-side: "Entre humains"
- Released: 15 April 2003
- Recorded: Studio Plus XXX, Paris
- Genre: Pop
- Length: 4:11
- Label: Mercury, Universal
- Songwriter(s): Pierre Lorain (lyrics); So (music)
- Producer(s): Pierre Jaconelli

Jenifer Bartoli singles chronology
"Des Mots qui résonnent!" (2002)	"Donne-moi le temps" (2003)	"Ma Révolution" (2004)

"Donne-moi le temps" (English: "Give Me the Time") is a 2002 song recorded by the French artist Jenifer Bartoli. Released on 15 April 2003, it was her fourth and last single, from her eponymous album, Jenifer. This song met success in France and Belgium (Wallonia) where it was a top ten hit.

== Song information ==
Written by Pierre Lorain and composed by So, the pop ballad deals with a love relationship.

The song features on many French compilations, such as Les plus belles voix 2, Hits & Co, Now! Hits Référence Vol. 6, Stars France 2003 vol. 2, Hits France 2003 and NRJ Music Awards 2004. The song was performed on Jenifer's first tour and was thus included on her live album Jenifer fait son live, as the sixth track.

"Donne-moi le temps" was performed as a duet by Jenifer and Grégory Lemarchal on the French show Star Academy 4. In 2013, the song was covered by Hélène Segara, Natasha St Pier, Claire Keim, Alizée and L'Orchestre Ostinato on the album La boîte à musique des Enfoirés.

== Chart performances ==
The single entered the French chart at number 21 on 19 April 2003 and hit number eight in its fourth week. Then it almost did not stop to drop on the chart, remaining for two weeks in the top ten, 18 weeks in the top 50 and 26 weeks on the chart (top 100). It was ranked at number 48 on the End of the Year Chart.

The single was charted for 15 weeks in Belgium (Wallonia), from 26 April 2003. It started at number 39 and reached a peak at number seven in its seventh week. Then the single dropped and totaled six weeks in the top ten. It features at number 37 on the Annual Chart.

In Switzerland, the single appeared at number 25 on 27 April 2003, then reached number 18 for two non consecutive weeks. It stayed for ten weeks in the top 50 and 21 weeks in the top 100.

== Track listings ==
- CD single
1. "Donne-moi le temps" (New mix) — 4:11
2. "Entre humains" (Lisa Miskovsky/adapt. Alana Filippi) — 3:58
- Digital download
1. "Donne-moi le temps" — 4:11
2. "Donne-moi le temps" (2005 live version) — 4:23

== Credits ==
=== Personnel ===
- Pierre Jaconelli: guitar
- Angepier: keyboards, piano & programming
- Dominique Grimaldi: bass guitar
- Christophe Deschamps: drums & percussion
- Denis Benarrosh: percussion
- Jean-François Berger: string arrangement & conducting
- Roland Chosson: French horn
- Cyril Normand: French horn

=== Design ===
- Antoine Verglas: front cover photography
- Michel Sedan: back cover photography
- Happydesign: cover design

== Charts ==
=== Weekly charts ===
Jénifer version

Chart (2003)	Peak position
Belgian (Wallonia) Singles Chart	7
European Singles Chart	45
French Singles Chart	8
Swiss Singles Chart	18

Les Enfoirés version

Chart (2013)	Peak position
Belgian (Wallonia) Singles Chart	45
French Singles Chart	99

=== Year-end charts ===
Chart (2003)	Position
Belgian (Wallonia) Singles Chart	37
French Airplay Chart	66
French Singles Chart	48
