= Le Passage (album) =

Studio album by Jenifer Bartoli
- Released: June 1, 2004
- Recorded: The Aerosol Grey Machine, Vollsjö; Studio Gang, Paris; KBros Studio, Stockholm; Studio Méga, Suresnes; Studio Plus XXX, Paris; Studio Ramsès 2, Paris; Westlake Audio, Los Angeles
- Genre: Pop, pop rock, soul
- Length: 43:53; 1:11:00 (double album)
- Label: Universal, Mercury
- Producer: Calogero, Andreas Karlegård, Martin Karlegård, Olivier Marly, Maxim Nucci, Big Smith

Jenifer Bartoli chronology
Jenifer (2002)	Le Passage (2004)	Jenifer fait son live (2005)

Singles from Le Passage
- 1. "Ma Révolution" Released: June 1, 2004; 2. "Le Souvenir de ce jour" Released: September 21, 2004; 3. "C'est de l'or" Released: February 15, 2005; 4. "Serre-moi" Released: August 29, 2005

Le Passage is the second studio album recorded by French singer Jenifer Bartoli. It was released on June 1, 2004 and contains the hit singles "Ma Révolution" and "Le Souvenir de ce jour". It became a top three album in France and Belgium (Wallonia). Famous artists such as Marc Levy, Calogero and Kyo participated in the writing of the record.

This album allowed Bartoli to be awarded 'Best French Artist' at the MTV Europe Music Awards, on November 18, 2004. In 2005, it also won a NRJ Music Awards in the category 'Francophone Album of the Year'.

== Track listing ==
No.	Title	Writer(s)	Length
1.	"Ma révolution"	Andreas Karlegård, Martin Karlegård	3:36
2.	"Le Souvenir de ce jour"	Benoît Poher, Nicolas Chassagne, Fabien Dubos, Florian Dubos	3:17
3.	"C'est de l'or"	Élodie Hesme, Calogero, Gioacchino Maurici	4:17
4.	"Ose"	Patrice Guirao, Maxim Nucci	3:53
5.	"Pour toi"	Tina Arena, Rémi Lacroix, Jérémie Mathot	3:42
6.	"J'en ai assez"	Andreas Karlegård, Martin Karlegård	3:11
7.	"Comme un yoyo"	Colin Campsie, Phil Thornalley	3:49
8.	"Le Passage"	Tristan Leroy, Arnaud Affolter	3:35
9.	"Celle que tu vois"	Jean-Marc Bernad, Pascal Lafa	4:17
10.	"Serre-moi"	Tristan Leroy, Sébastien Chouard, Maxim Nucci	3:38
11.	"Chou boup"	Jenifer Bartoli, Julien Cisinski, Maxim Nucci	3:31
12.	"De vous à moi"	Ondine Gaspar, Maxim Nucci	3:07
Total length:			43:53

== Album credits ==
- Barilla.design - design
- Idriss El Mehdi Benani - keyboards (C'est de l'or)
- Calogero - bass guitar (C'est de l'or)
- Xavier Caux - programming (Le passage)
- Christophe Dubois - drums & percussion (C'est de l'or)
- Peter Ebrelius - viola
- Tomas Ebrelius - violin
- Azim Haidaryan - photography
- Simon Hale - strings conducting
- Andreas Karlegård - bass guitar & keyboards
- Martin Karlegård - guitar
- Abraham Laboriel Jr. - drums
- Sandrine Le Bars - executive producer
- Christoffer Lundquist - strings conducting
- Olivier Marly - guitar (C'est de l'or)
- Jost Nickel - drums (Le passage)
- Maxim Nucci - guitar, keyboards & programming
- Anna Nygrén - piano
- Mikko Paavola - additional guitar
- Philippe Rault - executive producer for Bastille Productions
- Charlotta Weber Sjöholm - cello
- Big Smith - bass guitar (Le passage)
- Frank Tontoh - drums (Serre-moi & De vous à moi)
- Laurent Vernerey - bass guitar

Ma révolution, Le souvenir de ce jour, Pour toi, J'en ai assez, Comme un yoyo & Celle que tu vois

- Produced by Andreas Karlegård & Martin Karlegård for KBros
- Engineered by KBros at The Aerosol Grey Machine, Vollsjö, KBros Studio, Stockholm & Studio Ramsès 2, Paris
- Engineered by Ken Allardyce at Westlake Audio, Los Angeles
  - Assistant engineer - Jason Rankins (Westlake Audio)

C'est de l'or

- Produced by Calogero & Olivier Marly
- Engineered by Étienne Colin at Studio Gang, Paris
  - Assistant engineer - Florian Lagatta

Ose, Serre-moi & De vous à moi

- Produced by Maxim Nucci
- Engineered by Jean-Paul Gonnod at Studio Plus XXX, Paris
- Engineered by Stéphane Lévy-B at Studio Méga, Suresnes
- Pro Tools editing by Xavier Caux

Le passage

- Produced by Maxim Nucci & Big Smith
- Engineered by Mickaël Rangeard at Studio Plus XXX
  - Assistant engineer - Mathias Froidefond

Chou boup

- Produced by Andreas Karlegård, Martin Karlegård & Maxim Nucci
- Engineered by KBros at KBros Studio
- Engineered by Jean-Paul Gonnod at Studio Plus XXX
- Engineered by Stéphane Lévy-B at Studio Méga

- Artistic direction - Bertrand Lamblot
  - Assistant - Alexandra Cubizolles
- Mixed by Bob Clearmountain at Mix This!, Pacific Palisades
- Assistant mixing: Kevin Harp
- Mastered by Miles Showell at Metropolis Mastering, London

== Charts ==
=== Peak positions ===
Chart (2004)	Peak position
Belgian (Wallonia) Albums Chart	3
French Albums Chart	2
Swiss Albums Chart	16

=== Year-end charts ===
Chart (2004)	Position
Belgian (Wallonia) Albums Chart	17
French Albums Chart	17

=== Certifications ===
Region	Certification	Certified units/sales
Belgium (BRMA)	Gold	25,000^{*}
France (SNEP)	Platinum	300,000^{*}
^{*} Sales figures based on certification alone.
