= L'Amour et moi =

Single by Jenifer Bartoli

from the album L'Amour et moi
- Released: September 29, 2012
- Recorded: Studio du Palais des Congrès, Paris, Paris
- Genre: French pop
- Length: 3:59
- Label: Mercury Records, Universal
- Songwriter(s): Mutine, Yohann Malory
- Producer(s): Silvio Lisbonne

Jenifer Bartoli singles chronology
"Sur le fil" (2012)	"L'Amour et moi" (2012)	"Poupée de cire, poupée de son" (2013)

"L'Amour et moi" is Jenifer Bartoli's second single from her fifth album L'Amour et moi on which it is the fifth track. It was released on September 29, 2012 in Francophone countries and achieved success in France and Belgium (Wallonia).

== Charts ==
Chart (2012)	Peak position
Belgium (Ultratop 50 Wallonia)	26
France (SNEP)	22
