= Isabelle Ithurburu =

French sports journalist and television presenter

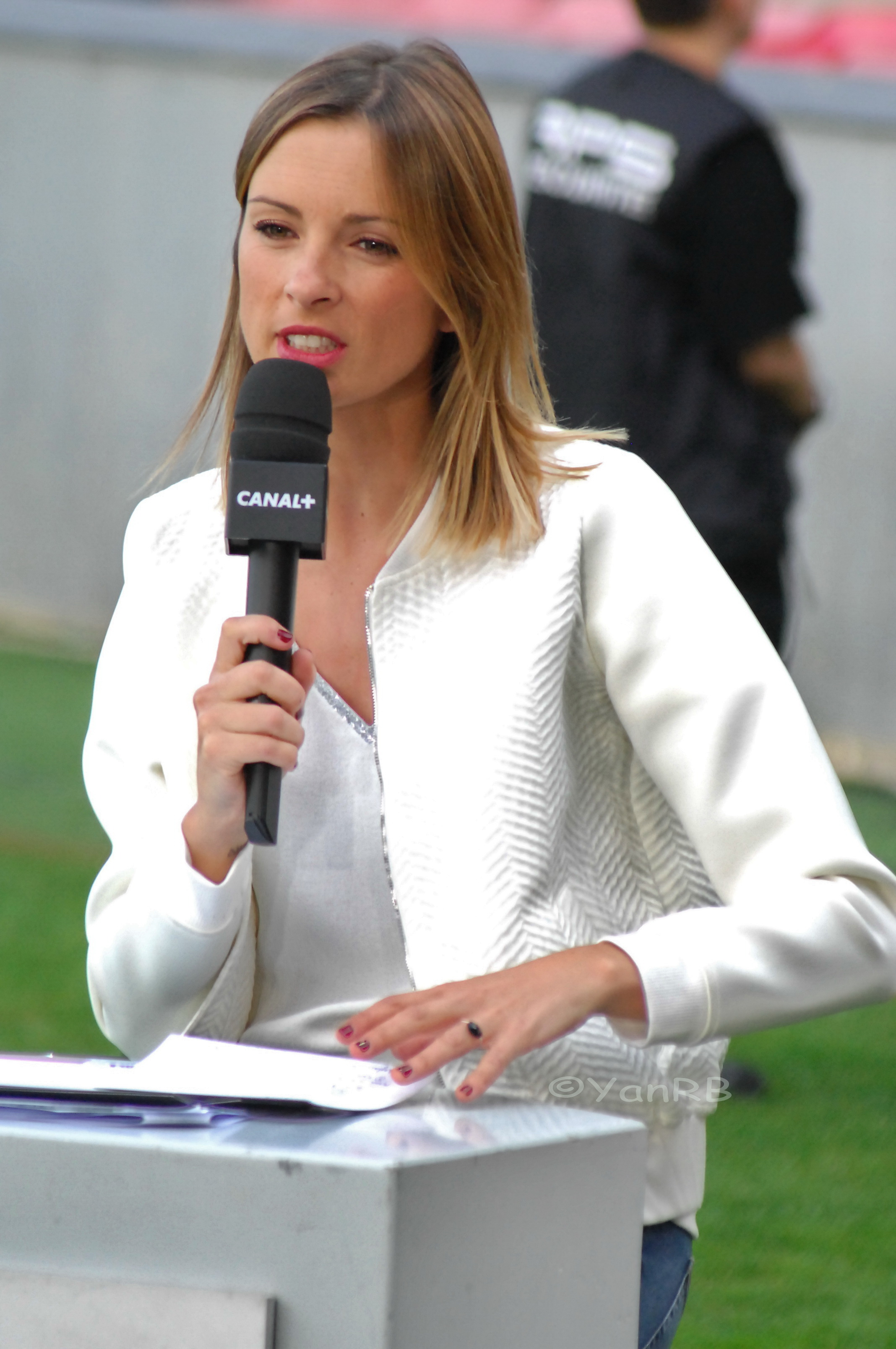
- Ithurburu in 2015
- Born: 24 February 1983 (age 43); Pau, France
- Occupations: Sports journalist, television presenter (rugby union)
- Years active: 2009–present
- Notable credit(s): Jour de rugby (Canal +), 50' Inside (TF1)
- Television: Canal+ TF1
- Spouse: Gonzalo Quesada (m. 2010; sep. 2015)
- Partner(s): Maxim Nucci, one child (2018)

Isabelle Ithurburu (born 24 February 1983) is a French sports journalist and television presenter.

== Life and career ==
Isabelle Ithurburu was born in Pau in the department of Pyrénées-Atlantiques, the daughter of a grocerystore owner of Basque origin. She participated at a beauty pageant contest and was elected Miss Pau-Béarn in 2001.

In 2005, she participated at the fifth season of Nouvelle Star and was ranked among the fifteenth final contestants who had the privilege to sing in direct, but was eliminated after the first prime of Baltard, after having performed the song "Butterfly" from the band Superbus.

After her studies of international trade, she was hired in 2009 by the channel Infosport+ of the Canal+ Group, where she presents many sport programs like Sports Dimanche, L'Édition du Soir and La Matinale Sports. During the 2011 Rugby World Cup, she presents Jour de Coupe du monde every weekend on Canal+.

In February 2012, after the departure of Darren Tulett, she succeeded him to present Samedi Sport on Canal+ while continuing to present Des décodeurs on Infosport+. During the season 2012–13, Ithurburu leaves the presentation of Samedi Sport and was replaced by Nathalie Ianetta and now presents Jour de rugby. She also presents the Wimbledon Championships and a documentary titled Grand Format on Canal+ Sport.

== Personal life ==
In 2010, Isabelle Ithurburu married Argentinian rugby player Gonzalo Quesada, who then became a rugby coach. She met him while he was a player at the Section Paloise, the rugby club of Pau, the city where she comes from. She separated from him in 2015. She had a daughter, Mia, with her boyfriend, Maxim Nucci (Yodelice), in 2018.
