= Lunatique =

Studio album by Jenifer Bartoli
- Released: November 5, 2007
- Studio: Studio Skyman, Paris; Angel Recording Studios, London; OldBNB Studio, Oxford
- Genre: Pop, pop rock, soul
- Length: 38:26
- Label: Universal, Mercury
- Producer: Maxim Nucci

Jenifer Bartoli chronology
Jenifer fait son live (2005)	Lunatique (2007)	Appelle-moi Jen (2010)

Singles from Lunatique
- 1. "Tourner ma page" Released: November 2007; 2. "Comme un hic" Released: March 2008; 3. "Si c'est une île" Released: June 2008

Lunatique is the third studio album recorded by French singer Jenifer Bartoli. It was released on November 5, 2007, and contains the hit singles "Tourner ma page", "Comme un hic" and "Si c'est une île". The album topped the chart in France, and was also a success in Belgium (Wallonia), earning a Gold certification.

The music of this album was composed by Jenifer and her husband, Maxim Nucci. However, it also contained collaborations with lyricist David Verlant, who wrote almost all the songs. Matthieu Chedid participated in the song "Touche-moi" and other titles, playing the guitar and the French actor Guillaume Canet participated in "Nos futurs". The strings and brass were arranged by Simon Hale and recorded at the Angel studio in London. The mixing of the album was done by Bob Clearmountain.

== Track listing ==
No.	Title	Writer(s)	Length
1.	"Tourner ma page"	David Verlant, Jenifer Bartoli, Maxim Nucci	2:53
2.	"Touche-moi"	David Verlant, Maxim Nucci	3:39
3.	"Comme un hic"	David Verlant, Jenifer Bartoli, Maxim Nucci	3:12
4.	"Nos futurs"	David Verlant, Maxim Nucci	3:49
5.	"Le Parfum"	David Verlant, Blair MacKichan, Maxim Nucci	3:58
6.	"Attention douleur fraîche"	David Verlant, Jenifer Bartoli, Maxim Nucci	3:30
7.	"Si c'est une île"	David Verlant, Xavier Caux, Maxim Nucci	2:47
8.	"Quitte à se quitter"	David Verlant, Maxim Nucci	3:39
9.	"Ca se pointe"	David Verlant, Maxim Nucci	3:14
10.	"Le bonheur me va au teint"	Julie d'Aimé, Jenifer Bartoli, Maxim Nucci	3:20
11.	"Lunatique"	Fabrice Ballot-Lena, Maxim Nucci	4:25
Total length:			38:26

Digital Bonus Track
No.	Title	Length
13.	"Portrait d'une femme heureuse"	2:59
Total length:		41:25

== Album credits ==
=== Personnel ===
- Maxime Garoute: drums
- Jérôme Goldet: bass guitar
- Maxim Nucci: bass guitar, guitar & keyboards
- Matthieu Chedid: additional guitar ("Touche-moi" & "Lunatique")
- Guillaume Canet: additional guitar ("Nos futurs")
- Xavier Caux: programming
- Simon Hale: horn arrangement, string arrangement & conducting
- Jackie Shave: concertmaster
- Noel Langley: trumpet
- Tom Rees-Roberts: trumpet
- Phil Todd: saxophone
- Fayyaz Virji: trombone
- Frank Ricotti: vibraphone
- Thelma Owen: harp

=== Production ===
- Arrangement & produced by Maxim Nucci
- Engineered by Xavier Caux at Studio Skyman, Paris
- Strings recorded by Niall Acott at Angel Recording Studios, London
- Assistant engineer (strings): Mat Bartram
- Horns recorded by Simon Hale & Tom Jenkins at OldBNB Studio, Oxford
- Mixed by Bob Clearmountain at Mix This!, Pacific Palisades
- Mixing assistant: Brandon Duncan
- Mastered by Gavin Lurssen at Lurssen Mastering, Los Angeles

=== Design ===
- André D.: photography
- Fabien Rocca: cover design

== Charts ==
=== Weekly charts ===
Chart (2007)	Peak position
Belgian (Wallonia) Albums Chart	2
French Digital Chart	3
French Albums Chart	1
Swiss Albums Chart	25

=== Year-end charts ===
Chart (2007)	Position
Belgian (Wallonia) Albums Chart	33
French Digital Chart	36
French Albums Chart	34

=== Certifications ===
Region	Certification	Certified units/sales
Belgium (BRMA)	Gold	15,000^{*}
^{*} Sales figures based on certification alone.
