= Benjamin Genton =

French footballer (born 1980)

Personal information
- Date of birth: 20 May 1980 (age 46)
- Place of birth: Paris, France
- Height: 1.88 m (6 ft 2 in)
- Position: Defender

Youth career
- 1995–1997: Montpellier

Senior career*
Years	Team	Apps	(Gls)
2000–2004	Créteil	89	(3)
2004–2010	Lorient	121	(0)
2010–2014	Le Havre	82	(1)
Total		292	(4)
- * Club domestic league appearances and goals

Benjamin Genton (born 20 May 1980) is a French former professional footballer who played as a defender.

== Personal life ==
His son Enzo Genton is also a footballer, while his younger brother Florian Genton is a sports journalist.
