= Au soleil =

Single by Jenifer Bartoli

from the album Jenifer
- B-side: "Secrets défenses"; "Junto al sol"; "Là où tu rêves"
- Released: July 2002 (France); July 2003 (Spain)
- Recorded: Studio Plus XXX, Paris
- Genre: French pop
- Length: 3:38 (album version); 3:18 (single version)
- Label: Island, Universal
- Songwriter(s): Hocine Hallaf
- Producer(s): Nicolas Neidhardt, Benjamin Raffaëlli

Jenifer Bartoli singles chronology
"J'attends l'amour" (2002)	"Au soleil" (2002)	"Des Mots qui résonnent!" (2002)

"Au soleil" (English: Under the Sun) is Jenifer Bartoli's second and the most successful single of her career, from her first album Jenifer on which it is the second track on this album. It was released in July 2002 in francophone countries and achieved a great success in France and Belgium (Wallonia), and was also a Top 20 hit in Spain.

== Song information ==
This optimistic song was written by Hocine Hallaf and produced by Nicolas Neidhardt & Benjamin Raffaëlli.

There is also a version in Spanish-language under the title "Junto al sol". This song was covered by Hong Kong Cantopop singer Janice Vidal in 2007 as "Doesn't Matter (無所謂)".

In the video, Jenifer walks on the beach. Suddenly, when she begins to sing the refrain, the clouds disappear and the sun starts to shine. This video was shot in February on the beach of Sainte-Croix, near Marseille, France.

In France, the single debuted at number ten on 13 July 2002 and reached a peak at number two for three weeks, but was unable to dislodge the two successive number-one hits Brastisla Boys' "Stach Stach" and MC Solaar's "Inch'Allah". The single remained for 12 weeks in the top ten, 21 weeks in the top 50 and 24 weeks in the top 100. The single was eventually awarded Gold certification by SNEP.

The single charted for 17 weeks on Belgian Ultratop 40 Singles Chart, from 20 July 2002. It entered at number 24, jumped to number seven, and eventually reached number four on 14 September.

"Au soleil" appeared for eight weeks on the Swiss Singles Chart, peaking at number 63 in its sixth week on 12 January 2003.

== Track listings ==
- CD single - France (Island, limited edition)
1. "Au soleil" (single version) — 3:18
2. "Secrets défenses" (Christophe Deschamps/Jeanne Ermilova) — 3:49
3. "Au soleil" (video)
- CD maxi - Spain (Mercury)
1. "Au soleil" — 3:38
2. "Au soleil" (Audio Agenda club dub mix) — 7:33
3. "Junto al sol" (Hocine Hallaf/adapt. Marcia Romano) — 3:40
4. "Là où tu rêves" (Benjamin Raffaëlli/Marie-Jo Zarb) — 4:02
- Digital download
1. "Au soleil" — 3:18
2. "Au soleil" (2005 live version) — 4:06

== Credits ==
=== Personnel ===
"Au soleil"

- Benjamin Raffaëlli: guitar
- Nicolas Neidhardt: keyboards & programming
- Laurent Vernerey: bass guitar
- Christophe Deschamps: drums & percussion
- Guillaume Eyango: backing vocals
- Murielle Lefebvre: backing vocals
- Jean-François Berger: string arrangement & conducting

"Secrets défenses"

- Pierre Jaconelli: guitar
- Vincent Perrot: keyboards & programming
- Christophe Voisin: keyboards & programming
- Laurent Vernerey: bass guitar
- Christophe Deschamps: drums

"Là où tu rêves"

- Benjamin Raffaëlli: guitar, keyboards & programming
- Laurent Vernerey: bass guitar
- Christophe Deschamps: drums & percussion
- Denis Benarrosh: percussion
- Guillaume Eyango: backing vocals
- Murielle Lefebvre: backing vocals
- Laurent Marimbert: string arrangement & conducting

=== Production ===
- "Au soleil" produced by Nicolas Neidhardt & Benjamin Raffaëlli
- "Secrets défenses" produced by Christophe Deschamps & Vincent Perrot
- "Là où rêves" produced by Benjamin Raffaëlli

=== Design ===
- Michel Sedan: photography
- Happydesign: cover design

== Charts and sales ==
=== Weekly charts ===
Chart (2002)	Peak position
Belgium (Wallonia) Singles Chart	4
European Singles Chart	7
French Singles Chart	2
Spanish Singles Chart	15
Swiss Singles Chart	63

=== Year-end charts ===
Chart (2002)	Position
Belgian (Wallonia) Singles Chart	22
Europe (Eurochart Hot 100)	54
French Singles Chart	23

=== Certifications ===
Region	Certification	Certified units/sales
France (SNEP)	Gold	250,000^{*}
^{*} Sales figures based on certification alone.

== Remake ==
In 2017, Jenifer made a remake of the song with the French singing formation Kids United. The new version appeared on the Kids United 2017 album Forever United. The song charted for one week on the French Singles Chart at number 146.
