= Clémentine Sarlat =

French sports journalist

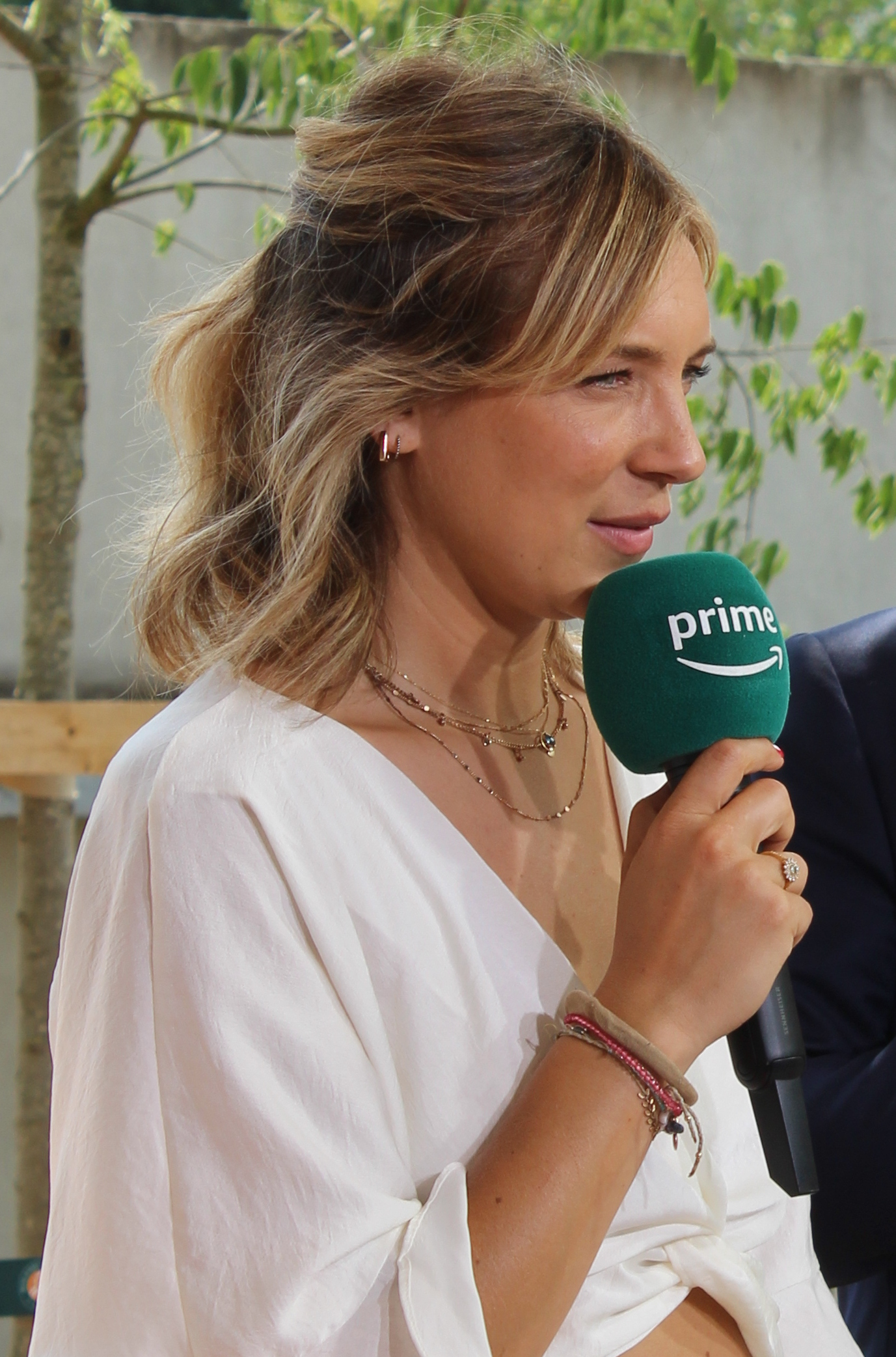
- Sarlat at the 2023 French Open
- Born: 2 March 1988 (age 38); Gironde, France
- Occupation: Sports journalist
- Years active: 2013–present
- Television: France Télévisions (2013–2018) beIN Sports (since 2018); TF1 (2019); Amazon Prime Video (2021); M6 (2023)

Clémentine Sarlat (French: [klemɑ̃tin saʁla]; born 2 March 1988) is a French journalist specialising in rugby, athletics, and tennis.

== Early life and education ==
Born in the Bordeaux region, Sarlat went to middle school in Gradignan and high school in Talence. For 10 years she practiced athletics at the Bordeaux Étudiants Club, including the 100 meters hurdle and long jump.

After a year as an exchange student at The Blake School (Minneapolis), a private school in the United States of America, Sarlat returned to Bordeaux to study a degree in history. Under the Erasmus program, she went another year abroad in Cádiz, Spain, to take her last year of undergraduate studies. Sarlat started her master's degree at the Institute Pratique du Journalisme with an apprenticeship at France Télévisions.

== Career ==
Sarlat joined the sports department at France Télévisions as an apprentice, where she worked for Stade 2 and Tout le sport for two years. Her knowledge of English and Spanish allowed her to be regularly assigned as a sideline journalist where she interviewed foreign athletes.

Sarlat later joined France 2 TV channel and was in charge of sports news on the Télématin programme.

From January 2013 to 2015, Sarlat was in charge of covering tennis tournaments such as Roland-Garros, the US Open and the Australian Open for the Eurosport tennis team

From 2015 to 2018, Sarlat was part of Stade 2's Sunday show presented by Céline Géraud and Matthieu Lartot. She also covered rugby union as a pitch-side journalist for games played by France's national team and for the Champions Cup. She got this position when Philippe Lafon left to become deputy-chief editor at Stade 2. She was also the court-side journalist during Roland-Garros where she interviewed players on the court.

In August 2016, she was part of France Télévisions team for the 2016 Summer Olympics, co-hosting a daily show from 12pm to 1pm called Bom Dia Rio, with Matthieu Lartot.

In September 2017, she was chosen to co-host the Stade 2 sport show with Matthieu Lartot on France 2, She joined after her maternity leave in January 2018. In April 2018, she left Stade 2 in order to host Tout le sport on France 3 during the weekends. In August 2018 after interviewing athletes after their events for the 2018 European Athletics Championships, she left France Télévisions.

In October 2018, Sarlat left France Télévisions and launched a podcast as a freelancer. In March 2019, Sarlat released the first episode of her podcast called La Matrescence. The podcast covered a wide variety of topics, with the main theme being about parenthood.

Sarlat also became a freelance journalist and worked for BeIn Sports as a pitch-side journalist during the European Rugby Champions Cup games. During the 2019 Rugby World Cup, broadcast on TF1 and TMC, she joined the Mag de la coupe du Monde program hosted by Denis Brogniart. She became host of the show after the quarter-finals, replacing Denis Brogniart who had to leave to record a new season of Koh-Lanta.

== Personal life ==
Sarlat is in a relationship with ex-rugby player Clément Marienval. In September 2017, she gave birth to their first child, a girl named Ella. She gave birth again on September 24, 2020, to a second girl named Jasmine.

In an interview for L'Équipe in April 2020, Sarlat complained about her ex-colleagues in the sport department of France Télévisions. Sarlat said she was subjected to sexist comments, and the station broke a promise to let her co-host the Stade 2 program with Matthieu Lartot in January 2018 after she came back from her maternity leave.

Delphine Ernotte, the president of France Télévisions, wrote an open letter to L'Équipe stating he was not aware of the incidents and had launched an investigation entrusted to a specialist team. On July 31, France Télévisions announced that three employees of the sports department had been laid-off without releasing their names, although they were published the same day in the JDD. A fourth employee received a warning. On August 7, Alain Vernon and Pierre-Étienne Léonard, two of the employees who were fired, stated that they would oppose their firing with the Labour Court. Vernon, a 64 year-old journalist and ex-union staff representative criticised Stade 2's editorial policy, and denied dubious practices against women during the 2000 Summer Olympics. He denied the remarks he had been accused of saying as well as having made "incessant demands for dinner", and believed that if he had harassed women, he would have been fired for "gross misconduct", as well as pointing out that his wife works for France 2 and that he was reported by a colleague that "had not spoken to me for at least 10 years" following a Union action.
