= Makeba (song) =

2015 song by Jain

Single by Jain

from the album Zanaka
- Released: 6 November 2015
- Recorded: 2014–2015
- Genre: Electropop; pop; worldbeat
- Length: 4:09 (album version); 2:48 (radio edit)
- Label: Spookland
- Songwriter: Jain
- Producer: Maxim "Yodelice" Nucci

Jain singles chronology
| "Come" (2015) | "Makeba" (2015) | "Dynabeat" (2017) |

"Makeba" is a song by French singer-songwriter Jain, released on 6 November 2015, from her debut studio album, Zanaka. It was written by Jain and produced by her longtime collaborator Maxim Nucci. The refrain of the song used a sample from the 1978 song "Me and the Gang" by the American percussionist, songwriter, arranger, and record producer Hamilton Bohannon. "Makeba" peaked at number seven on the French Singles Chart. It references Miriam Makeba, also known as "Mama Africa", a South African singer and anti-apartheid civil rights activist.

The Australian reality television show I'm a Celebrity...Get Me Out of Here! uses the song as an intro. Since 2019, it is also used as the intro theme to Amazon Prime Video's coverage of the Premier League in the United Kingdom and Ligue 1 in France.

In June 2023, eight years after its initial release, "Makeba" had a resurgence in popularity due to the virality it achieved on TikTok. The song has been used in ads for Marshalls and Levi's.

== Music video ==
The music video for "Makeba" was released on 30 November 2016 on Jain's official YouTube channel. Shot in South Africa, it opens with the last frame of her song "Come", also from Zanaka, as she crumples the frame from the camera as if it was a sheet of paper and walks to the right of the screen. As Jain turns knobs on the sound deck, street poles rise up or fall down, and buildings rise and lower. The video was filmed across Johannesburg, with locations including Miriam Makeba Street, Ponte Tower, Marble Towers, Berea Park, Orlando Power Station, and a pine forest in Bryanston.

It earned a nomination for Best Music Video at the 60th Grammy Awards, losing to "Humble" by Kendrick Lamar.

== Charts ==
=== Weekly charts ===
2015–2017 weekly chart performance for "Makeba"
| Chart (2015–2017) | Peak position |
|---|---|
| Belgium (Ultratop 50 Wallonia) | 27 |
| France (SNEP) | 7 |
| Romania TV Airplay (Media Forest) | 9 |
| Scottish Singles Sales (Official Charts) | 74 |

2023–2024 weekly chart performance for "Makeba"
| Chart (2023–2024) | Peak position |
|---|---|
| Austria (Ö3 Austria Top 40) | 11 |
| Belarus Airplay (TopHit) | 15 |
| Bolivia Airplay (Monitor Latino) | 15 |
| Bulgaria Airplay (PROPHON) | 1 |
| Canada (Canadian Hot 100) | 35 |
| CIS Airplay (TopHit) | 25 |
| Costa Rica Airplay (Monitor Latino) | 13 |
| Croatia International Airplay (Top lista) | 12 |
| Czech Republic Airplay (ČNS IFPI) | 54 |
| Czech Republic Singles Digital (ČNS IFPI) | 15 |
| Estonia Airplay (TopHit) | 1 |
| Estonia Airplay (TopHit) Ian Asher Remix | 13 |
| Germany (GfK) | 43 |
| Global 200 (Billboard) | 38 |
| Greece International Streaming (IFPI) | 7 |
| Hungary (Dance Top 40) | 3 |
| Hungary (Rádiós Top 40) | 35 |
| Hungary (Single Top 40) | 2 |
| Hungary (Stream Top 40) | 38 |
| Iceland (Tónlistinn) | 25 |
| Ireland (IRMA) | 51 |
| Israel International Airplay (Media Forest) | 8 |
| Italy (FIMI) | 49 |
| Kazakhstan Airplay (TopHit) | 24 |
| Latvia Airplay (LaIPA) | 5 |
| Latvia Streaming (LaIPA) | 1 |
| Lebanon (Lebanese Top 20) | 6 |
| Lithuania (AGATA) | 6 |
| Netherlands (Single Top 100) | 80 |
| Poland (Polish Streaming Top 100) | 25 |
| Portugal (AFP) | 146 |
| Russia Airplay (TopHit) | 22 |
| San Marino Airplay (SMRTV Top 50) Ian Asher Remix | 7 |
| Slovakia Airplay (ČNS IFPI) | 59 |
| Slovakia Singles Digital (ČNS IFPI) | 8 |
| Sweden (Sverigetopplistan) | 68 |
| Switzerland (Schweizer Hitparade) | 9 |
| Turkey International Airplay (Radiomonitor Türkiye) | 2 |
| UK Singles (Official Charts) | 52 |
| Ukraine Airplay (TopHit) | 8 |
| US Mainstream Top 40 (Billboard) | 26 |

=== Monthly charts ===
Monthly chart performance for "Makeba"
| Chart (2023) | Peak position |
|---|---|
| Belarus Airplay (TopHit) | 33 |
| CIS Airplay (TopHit) | 31 |
| Estonia Airplay (TopHit) | 1 |
| Estonia Airplay (TopHit) Ian Asher Remix | 25 |
| Latvia Airplay (TopHit) | 16 |
| Lithuania Airplay (TopHit) | 25 |
| Russia Airplay (TopHit) | 35 |
| Ukraine Airplay (TopHit) | 12 |

=== Year-end charts ===
2016 year-end chart performance for "Makeba"
| Chart (2016) | Position |
|---|---|
| France (SNEP) | 93 |

2017 year-end chart performance for "Makeba"
| Chart (2017) | Position |
|---|---|
| France (SNEP) | 161 |

2023 year-end chart performance for "Makeba"
| Chart (2023) | Position |
|---|---|
| Belarus Airplay (TopHit) | 81 |
| CIS Airplay (TopHit) | 141 |
| Estonia Airplay (TopHit) | 33 |
| Estonia Airplay (TopHit) Ian Asher Remix | 132 |
| Global Excl. US (Billboard) | 173 |
| Hungary (Dance Top 40) | 28 |
| Hungary (Single Top 40) | 90 |
| Latvia Airplay (TopHit) | 67 |
| Lithuania Airplay (TopHit) | 104 |
| Switzerland (Schweizer Hitparade) | 70 |

| Chart (2024) | Peak position |
|---|---|
| Belarus Airplay (TopHit) | 183 |
| Hungary (Dance Top 40) | 35 |

| Chart (2025) | Peak position |
|---|---|
| Belarus Airplay (TopHit) | 134 |
| Hungary (Dance Top 40) | 91 |

== Certifications ==
| Region | Certification | Certified units/sales |
|---|---|---|
| Austria (IFPI Austria) | Gold | 15,000^{‡} |
| Brazil (Pro-Música Brasil) | Gold | 30,000^{‡} |
| Canada (Music Canada) | 2× Platinum | 160,000^{‡} |
| France (SNEP) | Diamond | 333,333^{‡} |
| Hungary (MAHASZ) | 2× Platinum | 6,000^{‡} |
| Italy (FIMI) | Platinum | 100,000^{‡} |
| New Zealand (RMNZ) | Gold | 15,000^{‡} |
| Poland (ZPAV) | 3× Platinum | 150,000^{‡} |
| Spain (Promusicae) | Gold | 30,000^{‡} |
| United Kingdom (BPI) | Silver | 200,000^{‡} |
| United States (RIAA) | Platinum | 1,000,000^{‡} |
Streaming
| Greece (IFPI Greece) | Gold | 1,000,000^{†} |
^{‡} Sales+streaming figures based on certification alone.^{†} Streaming-only figures based on certification alone.

== Release history ==
Release dates and formats for "Makeba"
| Region | Date | Format | Label(s) | Ref. |
|---|---|---|---|---|
| United States | 18 July 2023 | Contemporary hit radio | Spookland | |

== See also ==
- List of Billboard number-one dance songs of 2023
