= Louane =

- Gender: female

Origin
- Origin: French
- Meaning: Combination of Lou, a short form of Louise, and Anne
- Region of origin: France

Other names
- Nicknames: Lou, Ane, Ann, An
- Related names: LouAnn, LouAnne, Lou-Anne, Lou-Ann, Lou Ann, LouAnn, LuAnn, LuAnne, Luu Anh, Lou, Lu, Louise, Anne, Louise-Anne, Anne-Louise, Luann, Luane, Luan

Louane (also spelled Lou-Anne or Louanne) is a French feminine name, derived from a combination of the names Louise and Anne. It rose in popularity in the early 2000s, reaching number one in the top 100 names given to baby girls in France in 2014. The short form Lou, is also popular for girls in France.

== People with the given name ==
- Louane (singer), mononym of French singer, participant in series 2 of The Voice: la plus belle voix, 2025 Eurovision Song Contest participant
- LouAnne Johnson, American writer
- Louane Plisson (born 2012), French artistic gymnast
- Louanne Sirota, American actress

== Characters ==
- Luann Van Houten (née Mussolini), fictional character from the TV series The Simpsons
- Louanne Katraine, fictional character from the TV series Battlestar Galactica
