= Des mots qui résonnent! =

"Des Mots qui résonnent!"

Single by Jenifer Bartoli

from the album Jenifer
- B-side: "Nos points communs"
- Released: 12 November 2002
- Recorded: France
- Genre: Pop
- Length: 3:24
- Label: Universal
- Songwriter(s): Ian-Paolo Lira (lyrics); Patrick Johansson, Linus Nordén (music); Christian Bouclier (adaptation)
- Producer(s): Benjamin Raffaëlli

Jenifer Bartoli singles chronology
"Au soleil" (2002)	"Des Mots qui résonnent!" (2002)	"Donne-moi le temps" (2003)

"Des Mots qui résonnent!" (English: Some words which resonate!) is a song recorded by the French singer Jenifer Bartoli. It was released in December 2002 as the third single from her first album Jenifer, on which it features as the first or 12th track following the editions. It achieved success in France and Belgium (Wallonia), reaching the top four.

== Song information ==
The song was written by Swedish hit makers Linus Nordén, Patrick Ebson and Ian-Paolo Lira. The French adaptation was written by Christian Bouclier and produced by Benjamin Raffaëlli. The song has rock sonorities, particularly the refrain which is played on guitar.

In France, the single debuted at a peak of number four, on 7 December 2002 and reached this position two other times. It totaled seven weeks in the top ten, 17 weeks in the top 50 and 23 weeks in the top 100. The single features at number 44 on the Annual Chart. As of July 2014, it is the 104th best-selling single of the 21st century in France, with 298,000 units sold.

In Belgium (Wallonia), the single was charted for 15 weeks on the Ultratop 50, from 12 December 2002. It went to number 13, reached number three for four consecutive weeks, then dropped on the chart. It totaled eight weeks in the top ten. Certified Gold disc, it was ranked at number 47 on the End of the Year Chart.

In Switzerland, the single debuted at number 47 on 15 December 2002 and hit number 15. Then it dropped slowly and remained for 14 weeks in the top 50 and 21 weeks in the top 100. It is Jenifer's most successful single in this country.

== Track listings ==
- CD single
1. "Des Mots qui résonnent!" — 3:24
2. "Nos Points communs" (Marc Lavoine/Georges Lunghini) — 3:56
- Digital download
1. "Des Mots qui résonnent!" — 3:24
2. "Des Mots qui résonnent!" (2005 live version) — 4:08

== Credits ==
=== Personnel ===
"Des mots qui résonnent !"

- Benjamin Raffaëlli: guitar & programming
- Nicolas Neidhardt: keyboards
- Laurent Vernerey: bass guitar
- Ian Thomas: drums
- Valérie Belinga: backing vocals
- Guillaume Eyango: backing vocals
- Jean-François Berger: string arrangement & conducting

"Nos points communs"

- Philippe Russo: guitar
- François Delabrière: additional guitar
- Matthew Vaughan: programming
- Laurent Vernerey: bass guitar
- Christophe Deschamps: drums
- Jean-François Berger: string arrangement & conducting, keyboards & programming

=== Production ===
- "Des mots qui résonnent!" produced by Benjamin Raffaëlli
- "Nos points communs" produced by Jean-François Berger & François Delabrière

=== Design ===
- Antoine Verglas: front cover photography
- Michel Sedan: back cover photography
- Happydesign: cover design

== Charts and sales ==
=== Weekly charts ===
Chart (2003)	Peak position
Belgium (Wallonia) Singles Chart	3
European Singles Chart	14
French SNEP Singles Chart	4
Swiss Singles Chart	15

=== Year-end charts ===
End of year chart (2002)	Position
French Singles Chart	51
End of year chart (2003)	Position
Belgian (Wallonia) Singles Chart	47
French Singles Chart	44

=== Certifications ===
Region	Certification	Certified units/sales
Belgium (BEA)	Gold	25,000^{*}
^{*} Sales figures based on certification alone.
