= J'attends l'amour =

Single by Jenifer Bartoli

from the album Jenifer
- B-side: "Viens me voir"
- Released: April 2002
- Recorded: 2002; Studio Plus XXX, Paris
- Genre: French pop
- Length: 3:39
- Label: Island
- Songwriters: Johanna Demker; Jeanne Ermilova (adaptation)
- Producers: Nicolas Neidhardt, Benjamin Raffaëlli

Jenifer Bartoli singles chronology
"J'attends l'amour" (2002)	"Au soleil" (2002)

"J'attends l'amour" (English: "'I'm Waiting for Love") is a 2002 song recorded by the French artist Jenifer Bartoli. Released in April 2002, it was her debut single, from her eponymous album, Jenifer. This song was a great success in France and Belgium (Wallonia).

== Song information ==
This song is actually a French-language adaptation of Johanna Demker's song "True Love". The music video was shot in London, and shows the singer walking in the streets.

The song features on many French compilations, such as Best Of France 2002 and Now! Hits Référence Vol. 2. It was also available on the Star Academy's albums, Les Singles and Le Live. The song was included on Jenifer's live album Jénifer fait son live, as the 17th track.

In February 2007, the song was also released in the U.S. at the same time as the album Jenifer.

The song went straight to number two on the French Singles Chart, on 20 April 2002, and was unable to dislodge Shakira's "Whenever, Wherever". Then it almost did not stop to drop the following weeks, totalling seven weeks in the top ten, 12 weeks in the top 50 and 19 weeks in the top 100. It achieved Gold status and ranked 30th on the End of the Year Chart.

The single charted for 13 weeks in Belgium (Wallonia), from 27 April 2002. It started at number eight, then climbed to number two, just behind her former candidate of the Star Academy 1, Jean-Pascal Lacoste, with his single "L'Agitateur". Then it dropped on the chart and remained for eight weeks in the top ten. It was certified Gold disc and features at number 14 on the Annual Chart.

== Track listings ==
- CD single
1. "J'attends l'amour" — 3:39
2. "Viens me voir" (Yorgos Benardos/Ingrid Roux) — 3:25
- Digital download
1. "J'attends l'amour" — 3:39
2. "J'attends l'amour" (2005 live version) — 4:15

== Personnel ==
- Benjamin Raffaëlli: guitar
- Nicolas Neidhardt: keyboards & programming
- Laurent Vernerey: bass guitar
- Christophe Deschamps: drums & percussion
- Guillaume Eyango: backing vocals
- Murielle Lefebvre: backing vocals
- Laurent Marimbert: string arrangement & conducting ("J'attends l'amour")
- Bertrand Cervera: violin solo ("J'attends l'amour")
- Cyrille Lacrouts: cello solo ("J'attends l'amour")
- Michel Sedan: photography

== Charts and sales ==
=== Weekly charts ===
Chart (2002)	Peak position
Belgian (Wallonia) Singles Chart	2
European Singles Chart	7
French Singles Chart	2

=== Year-end charts ===
Chart (2002)	Position
Belgian (Wallonia) Singles Chart	14
French Singles Chart	30

=== Certifications ===
Region	Certification	Certified units/sales
Belgium (BRMA)	Gold	25,000^{*}
France (SNEP)	Gold	250,000^{*}
^{*} Sales figures based on certification alone.
