= Le lac (song) =

Single by Julien Doré

from the album &
- Released: July 2016
- Genre: Pop
- Length: 3:57
- Songwriters: Julien Doré; Darko; Baptist Homo
- Producer: Antoine Gaillet

"Le lac" is a song by Julien Doré released in July 2016.

== Chart performance ==
=== Weekly charts ===
Chart (2016)	Peak position
Belgium (Ultratop 50 Wallonia)	3
France (SNEP)	1
Switzerland (Schweizer Hitparade)	72

=== Year-end charts ===
Chart (2016)	Position
Belgium (Ultratop Wallonia)	20
