= Jenifer (singer) =

French singer (born 1982)

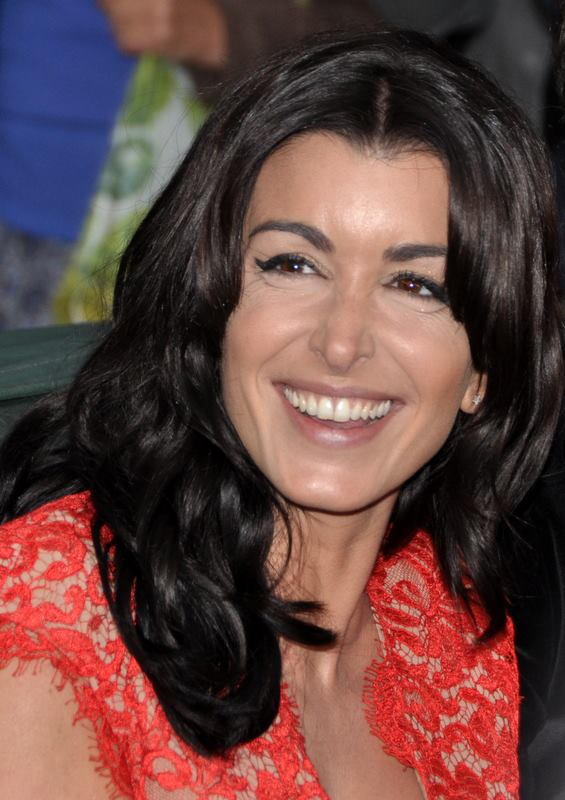
- Jenifer in October 2012
- Born: Jenifer Yaël Juliette Dadouche-Bartoli; 15 November 1982 (age 43); Nice, France
- Other name: Jenifer Bartoli
- Occupation: Singer
- Years active: 2001–present
- Spouse(s): Ambroise Fieschi (m. 2019), one child, born 2021
- Partners: Maxim Nucci (2002-2008, one child); Thierry Neuvic (2013-2016, one child)
- Children: 3
- Musical career
- Genres: Pop, Pop-rock, Soul
- Instrument: Vocals
- Years active: 2001–present
- Labels: Mercury Records; Universal Music Group

Jenifer Yaël Juliette Dadouche-Bartoli (born 15 November 1982), known by the mononym Jenifer, is a French singer.

Since winning the first season of Star Academy France in 2002, she has had a number of hit singles on the French, Belgian and Swiss charts.

== Biography ==
Jenifer Bartoli was raised with her younger brother Jonathan, by her mother and father, Michel Dadouche and Christine Bartoli. Her mother is part Corsican-Italian and part Belgian; her father is a Jewish Algerian. She comes from a modest background. She participated in the Graines de star television broadcast in 1997, but this was a failure.

Jenifer decided to go to Paris and attend the casting for the first series of Star Academy France, which went on to become a huge hit on French television. She was selected, and eventually won. The hit single "J'attends l'amour" (I'm waiting for love) soon followed. After the tour with her band that followed her victory, she toured as a solo artist from October 2002 until January 2003, and eventually performed at the Paris Olympia, which she had dreamed of as a child.

Her debut self-titled album went on to sell over three-quarters of a million copies. The album featured a song written by Marc Lavoine and a duet with fellow Star Academy student Mario. The second single "Au soleil" became one of the "tubes de l'été" (Summer hits) of 2002 in France. The album was re-released later to include two new tracks: "Entre Humains" and "Des Mots Qui Résonnent". The latter became her third top ten single in France and Jenifer stated that it was more her style of music, being more pop/rock. Finally a fourth song, the ballad "Donne Moi Le Temps" was released.

In 2004 Jenifer returned onto the scene with her second, more personal, melancholy album "Le Passage". Among others, this album contained songs written by Calogero, Kyo, Tina Arena and one song Jenifer co-wrote. This album contains the singles "Ma Révolution" (My Revolution), "Le Souvenir De Ce Jour" (The Memory of This Day), "C'est De L'Or" (It's Golden) and "Serre Moi" (Hold me). The album was supported by an extensive tour across France and was followed by the release of a live album "Jenifer Fait Son Live" and an accompanying DVD.

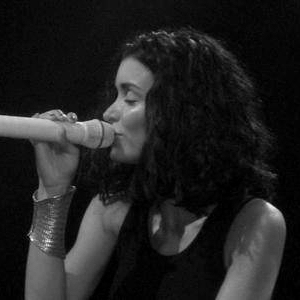
Jenifer performing in 2005.

In November 2010, Jenifer released her fourth studio album called "Appelle-moi Jen" (Call Me Jen), which charted at number 13 in France. It's a pop/rock-electronical album which has a 1980s French song lookalike. The first single of the album, "Je danse"(I Dance), was released in September 2010.

In 2012, she is a The Voice's coach (with Florent Pagny, Garou and Mika) for TF1.

== Personal life ==
In 2002, Jenifer met French musician and songwriter, Maxim Nucci in studio when she was working on her debut album, and they started dating soon after. On 5 December 2003, she gave birth to their son, Aaron at only 21. However, they called it quits in February 2008 after almost six years of dating.

In July 2013, Jenifer started dating French actor Thierry Neuvic. After months of speculations, Jenifer announced in April 2014 that she is 5 months pregnant with her second child. She gave birth to their son, Joseph, on 13 August 2014. In January 2016, it was publicly revealed that Jenifer and Neuvic were no longer together.

She began dating Corsican businessman Ambroise Fieschi in April 2016, and the two were married on 21 August 2019 in Serra-di-Ferro, Corsica. Her third son, Juvanni, was born on May 8, 2021.

== Philanthropy ==
Jenifer is a member of the Les Enfoirés charity ensemble since 2003.

In 2006, she also became an active patron of the charity "Chantal Mauduit" that helps kids from Kathmandu, Nepal.

She's also involved in the French charity "Rêves" that enables sick kids to realise their dreams.

In 2012, she sold her Chantal Thomass corset on Vestiaire Collective and managed to raise €8000 for the Telethon, a famous French charity aiming to help people with neuromuscular diseases.

== Legal issue ==
In 2019, Jenifer and her partner Ambroise Freschi were convicted of assaulting a photographer.

== Awards ==
- NRJ Radio's NRJ Music Awards :
  - Best French newcomer (2003)
  - Best French album (2005)
  - Best French female artist (2004, 2005, 2006, 2008, 2009, 2011)
- MTV Europe Music Awards
  - Best French artist (2005)

== Discography ==
=== Albums ===
==== Studio albums ====
Year	Title	Peak chart positions					Certifications
Year	Title	FRA	FRA DL	BEL (Fl)	BEL (Wa)	SWI	Certifications
2002	Jenifer	2	—	—	1	9	SNEP: Platinum; BEA: Gold
2004	Le Passage	1	—	—	3	16	SNEP: Platinum; BEA: Gold
2007	Lunatique	1	3	—	2	5	BEA: Gold
2010	Appelle-moi Jen	4	5	—	10	—	
2012	L'Amour et moi	2	3	—	1	16	
2013	Ma déclaration	2	—	13	1	33	
2016	Paradis secret	8	—	—	17	29	
2018	Nouvelle page	2	—	—	4	9	SNEP: Platinum
2022	N°9	4	—	—	7	—	

==== Live albums ====
Year	Title	Chart position				Certifications
Year	Title	FRA	FRA DL	BEL (Wa)	SWI	Certifications
2005	Jenifer fait son live	6	14	6	77	SNEP: Gold

==== Compilation albums ====
Year	Title	Peak chart positions
Year	Title	BEL (Wa)
2024	Jukebox 2002–2012	17

=== Singles ===
Year	Title	Chart position			Certifications	Album
Year	Title	FRA	BEL (Wa)	SWI	Certifications	Album
2002	"Gimme! Gimme! Gimme! (A Man After Midnight)" (with Olivia Ruiz & Carine Haddadou)	1	11	–		Star Academy, L'Album
2002	"J'attends l'amour"	2	2	–	SNEP: Gold; BEA: Gold	Jenifer
2002	"Au soleil"	2	4	63	SNEP: Gold	Jenifer
2002	"Des mots qui résonnent!"	4	3	15	BEA: Gold	Jenifer
2003	"Donne-moi le temps"	8	7	18		Jenifer
2004	"Ma révolution"	9	9	21		Le passage
2004	"Le souvenir de ce jour"	6	7	27		Le passage
2005	"C'est de l'or"	14	17	71		Le passage
2005	"Serre-moi"	25	14	21		Le passage
2007	"Tourner ma page"	3	3	37		Lunatique
2008	"Comme un hic"	10	6	73		Lunatique
2008	"Si c'est une île"	–	–	–		Lunatique
2010	"Je danse"	29	3	–		Appelle-moi Jen
2011	"L'envers du paradis"	59	–	–		Appelle-moi Jen
2011	"L'amour fou"	86	–	–		Appelle-moi Jen
2012	"Sur le fil"	24	11	–		L'amour et moi
2012	"L'amour et moi"	26	22	–		L'amour et moi
2013	"Les jours électriques"	52	–	–		L'amour et moi
2013	"Poupée de cire, poupée de son"	21	16	–		Ma déclaration
2013	"Résiste"	85	–	–		Ma déclaration
2013	"Ella, elle l'a"	90	–	–		Ma déclaration
2013	"Evidemment"	97	–	–		Ma déclaration
2013	"Si Maman si"	117	–	–		Ma déclaration
2013	"La déclaration"	148	–	–		Ma déclaration
2013	"Diego libre dans sa tête"	164	–	–		Ma déclaration
2013	"Message personnel"	190	–	–		Ma déclaration
2013	"L'air du vent"	43	–	–		We Love Disney
2016	"Paradis secret"	7	44	–		Paradis secret
2016	"Mourir dans tes yeux"	34	–	–		Paradis secret
2016	"Aujourd'hui"	151	–	–		Paradis secret
2017	"Au soleil" (with Kids United)	146	–	–		Kids United album Forever United
2018	"Notre idylle"	7	13	–		Nouvelle page
2019	"Encore et encore"	51	28	–		Nouvelle page
2019	"Les choses simples" (featuring Slimane)	16	8	–	SNEP: Gold	Nouvelle page
2019	"Comme c’est bon"	12	–	–		Nouvelle page
2019	"On oublie le reste" (featuring Kylie Minogue)	– (Note: "On oublie le reste" did not enter the French Top 150 Singles Chart, but peaked at number 9 on the French Digital Songs Sales Chart.)	–	–		Nouvelles pages (re-release of Nouvelle page)
2022	"Sauve qui aime"	–	15	–		N°9
2023	"Je te donne" (featuring M. Pokora)	–	50	–		Non-album single

== Filmography ==
Year	Title	Role	Director	Notes
2012–2015, 2019	The Voice: la plus belle voix	Herself		Coach
2014	Les Francis	Laetitia	Fabrice Begotti	
2017	Don't Tell Her	Laura Brunel	Solange Cicurel	
2018	Traqués	Sarah Munoz	Ludovic Colbeau-Justin	
2019	Le temps est assassin	Salomé Romani	Claude-Michel Rome	
2014-2020	The Voice Kids	Herself		Coach
2023	Superpapa	Marina	Sophie Boudre	
2024	Drag Race France	Herself		Guest judge

Preceded by —	Winner of Star Academy France; 2001	Succeeded by Nolwenn Leroy
