= Florian Genton =

French sports journalist

- Born: November 5, 1981 (age 44); Paris
- Citizenship: France
- Occupation: sports journalism
- Years active: Since 2001
- Employer: RMC (France) (2001–2008)

Florian Genton is a French sports journalist born on November 5, 1981, in Paris.

== Biography ==
=== Family and education ===
Genton is the younger brother of Benjamin Genton, a former professional player at Le Havre AC and now part of the staff at FC Lorient, and cousin of the Cheyrou brothers (Bruno and Benoît). They grew up in the town of Jouy-en-Josas in Yvelines and began playing football at FC Versailles 78. The least talented of the three, he focused on his studies. After completing an Economic and Social Sciences baccalaureate, he entered Studec, which allowed him to do internships, including one in September 2001 at RMC Info.

=== Career ===
When Genton joined RMC in September 2001, it was initially for a two-month internship. The internship was extended until May 2002, at which point the sports director of RMC, François Pesenti, offered him a temporary contract for the summer.

In September 2002, he was given a permanent contract and became a full-fledged journalist, officially starting his journalism career. On RMC Info, he alternated between hosting shows, reporting, and commentating. Specializing in football, he covered UEFA Euro 2004 and the 2006 FIFA World Cup.

In 2006, he replaced Jean Resseguié in hosting the radio show Luis attaque with Luis Fernandez from Monday to Thursday from 6 PM to 7:30 PM (then from 4 PM to 6 PM). He also hosted the Ligue 1 multiplexes every Saturday with Jean-Michel Larqué on Intégrale Foot.

Just before UEFA Euro 2008, he announced to François Pesenti that he was leaving RMC after the competition. The latter decided to end their relationship before the Euro, after 7 years at RMC.

In the fall of 2008, he joined Orange Sport. On Orange, he took on the role of field reporter for the Ligue 1 match on Saturday evenings with a team consisting of Céline Géraud (host of the Ligue 1 Football Tour and After Football Tour), Denis Balbir (commentator), Youri Djorkaeff (analyst), Franck Sauzée (analyst), Christian Karembeu (analyst), and Jérôme Alonzo (analyst).

In September 2008, he became a columnist on Europe 1 Foot hosted by Alexandre Delpérier on Europe 1.

Since the fall of 2009, he reunited with Luis Fernandez for the Luis Football Tour every Friday and hosted L'Hebdo de la Bundesliga every Monday.

On August 23, 2010, Genton returned to RMC, once again hosting Luis attaque with Luis Fernandez after a two-year hiatus.

Florian Genton left Orange Sport and RMC, and joined beIN Sports starting with the 2012–2013 season. He hosts the pre-show and post-match of the big Ligue 1 game on Friday evenings with Éric Roy and Luis Fernandez or Jean-Alain Boumsong, presents Dimanche Ligue 1 Le Mag every Sunday from 12 PM to 2 PM with Luis Fernandez, and is the field reporter for UEFA Champions League matches. Since the start of the 2016/2017 season, he has hosted the show Vendredi Ligue 1 in the second half of the evening with Luis Fernandez.
