= Alana Filippi =

French singer and songwriter (died 2020)

- Born: Pascale Filippi; 11 September 1960; Paris, France
- Died: 11 January 2020 (aged 59)
- Other name: Jeanne Ermilova
- Occupation: Singer

Alana Filippi (1960 – 11 January 2020) was a French singer and songwriter. Her real name was Pascale Filippi, and she also sometimes used the pseudonym Jeanne Ermilova.

== Biography ==
Born in Paris, Filippi moved to Nantes with her parents at a young age. She took drama lessons at the Couturier Jacques Organization. Couturier was also head of the Maison de la Culture Loire Atlantique. When her acting career began, Filippi took the name Alana.

Filippi began her career in theatre. She wrote songs for Calogero, Maurane, Jenifer, Pascal Obispo, Stanislas, Natasha St-Pier, and Grégory Lemarchal.

== Discography ==
=== Albums ===
- Laissez-les moi (1993)

=== Singles ===
- Sangs Mêlés (1993)
- Laissez Les Moi / Extraits (1993)
- Si Tu M'abandonnes (1993)
- Toutes Ces Photos / Tu T'en Vas (1993)

== Awards ==
- Vincent Scotto Award (2005)
