= Jain (singer) =

French musician (born 1992)

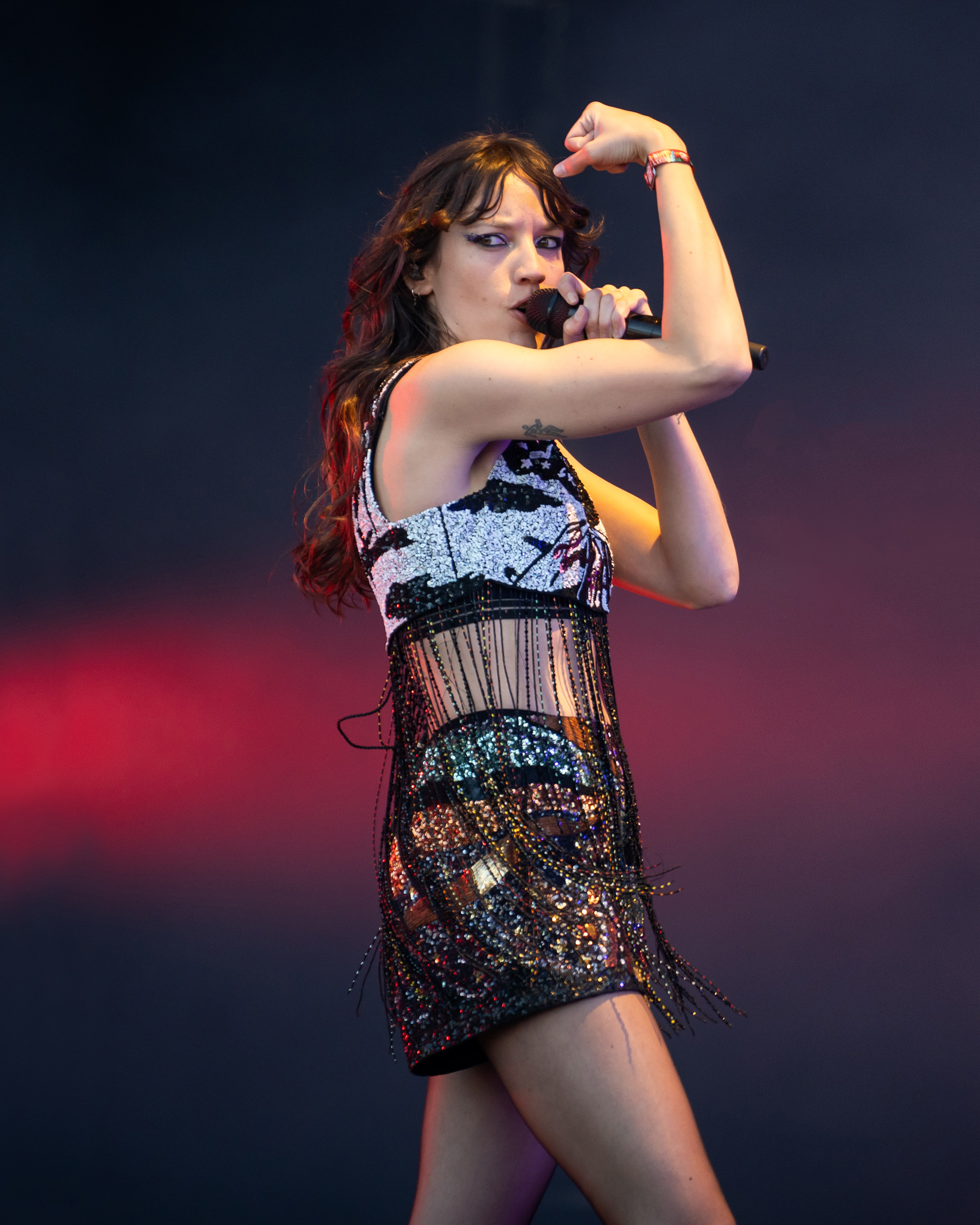
- Jain in 2024

Background information
- Born: Jeanne Louise Galice; 7 February 1992 (age 34); Toulouse, Occitania, France
- Genres: Pop; worldbeat; art pop; chanson; Afropop; dance-pop
- Occupations: Musician; singer-songwriter
- Instruments: Vocals; guitar; goblet drum
- Years active: 2013–present
- Labels: Spookland, RCA

Jeanne Louise Galice (French pronunciation: [ʒan lwiz ɡalis]; born 7 February 1992), better known by her stage name Jain (/dʒeɪn/), is a French singer-songwriter and musician.

Jain began her career in 2013 when she met Mr. Flash, who introduced her to musical programming. She then published her demo tracks on MySpace, where she was noticed by Dready, who remained her longtime manager. Yodelice was interested in her so he invited her to Paris. Her debut album, Zanaka, was released on 6 November 2015. Her second album, titled Souldier, was released on 24 August 2018.

== Biography ==
=== Early years ===
Jain was born on 7 February 1992, in Toulouse, France. Her mother is half French and half Malagasy. She has Malagasy origins by her grandfather. Jain learned to play the guitar at the age of 16, and even though she is left-handed, she learned to play right-handed.

Her family moved around the world due to her father's job with a French oil company. She left France at the age of nine for Dubai, where her father worked; then lived for four years in the Republic of Congo, which she credits for her taste for danceable melodies; and then spent a year in Abu Dhabi, before moving to Paris where she started a pre-art-school foundation course. These trips influenced her musical style. She also learned how to play drums in Pau, Arabic percussion in the Middle East, and musical programming in Congo. In 2010, she went to Paris to join a preparatory school for art.

=== Career beginnings ===
Jain began composing demo tracks in Pointe-Noire, Republic of Congo. There she met Mr. Flash, who introduced her to musical programming. She then published her demo tracks on MySpace, where she was noticed by Dready, who became her manager. Yodelice also discovered these tracks and invited Jain to meet him in Paris. They began to work together, and Yodelice helped to launch her career. Her stagename comes from a saying from Jain philosophy that she takes a liking to which is "Don't be sorry if you lose and don't be proud if you win". Jain was a supporting artist for Yodelice's tour. They appeared together on the television show Taratata in 2013 and performed a duet cover of "Redemption Song".

=== Hope EP and Zanaka ===
Yodelice became her producer and worked on her first EP, Hope. It was released on 22 June 2015 and included four songs including the single "Come" which met with considerable success in France and Spain. A music video for "Come" was released on 2 June 2015 to Jain's official YouTube channel. In November 2016, "Come" was certified Diamond in France. The song has also been used as a jingle by the Polish television channel Polsat and in 2017 it was featured in the American horror comedy web television series Santa Clarita Diet. It was also featured in the second episode of the first season of the Amazon series Hanna. Jain performed at the 2015 Solidays Festival, the BIG Festival (Biarritz International Groove) in Biarritz and Bebop Festival.

On 21 September 2015, Jain revealed the cover of her debut album Zanaka. "Zanaka" means "child" in Malagasy, and the title is a tribute to her mother who is of Franco-Malagasy origin. The album's release date was announced as 6 November 2015 along with the track listing on 8 October 2015. It included 10 songs including the singles "Come" and "Makeba". Makeba was used on a Levi's commercial which showed dancers (wearing the jeans) in an ethnic beat setting. On 9 October 2015, the album's second track "Heads Up" was released as a pre-order bonus. It was followed by "Hob" on 19 October 2015. Zanaka was certified gold in February 2016 for sales exceeding 50,000 copies in France. In December 2018, it was certified diamond in France for sales exceeding 500,000 copies. Zanaka was later released in the United Kingdom and the United States on 21 October 2016. It was preceded by the release of "Heads Up" and "Mr Johnson" as pre-order bonuses on 8 October 2016 and 14 October 2016 respectively. In 2016, she was one of the nominees at the Victoires de la Musique Awards in the category "Album Révélation" for Zanaka. On 25 November 2016, a deluxe version of Zanaka was released. It added the songs "City" (originally from the Hope EP), "Son of a Sun" and "Dynabeat" as well as an extended version of "Come" and two remixes.

A music video for the single "Makeba" was released to Jain's official YouTube channel on 30 November 2016. The music video was nominated for Best Music Video at the 60th Annual Grammy Awards in 2018.

On 1 February 2017, she performed "Come" on The Late Show with Stephen Colbert. On 25 April 2017, she performed "Makeba" on Later... with Jools Holland.

On 10 July 2017, a music video for the song "Dynabeat" was released to Jain's official YouTube channel.

On 3 August 2017, she performed at Chicago's Lollapalooza Festival.

=== Souldier ===
On 25 May 2018, "Alright" was released as the lead single from her second studio album Souldier, which was released on 24 August 2018. A music video for "Alright" was released on 25 June 2018. "Alright" peaked at number 6 in France, spending three weeks in the top 10. In 2018, "Alright" was the 51st biggest selling single of the year in France.

The album's title, cover and tracklist were announced on 29 June 2018 and it was made available for pre-order along with "Star" as a pre-order bonus and promotional single. The album's title is a play on words between 'soldier' and 'soul'. The song "Star" is about the position of young women in the music industry. On 17 August 2018 "Souldier" was released as the album's second promotional single. The song was inspired by the Orlando nightclub shooting and describes a soldier who seeks redemption. The album was a commercial success, particularly in Jain's native France, where it debuted atop the charts and sold over 200,000 copies. Furthermore, Souldier was the 45th best selling album of 2018 in France.

On 8 October 2018, "Oh Man" was released as the album's second single. A music video for the song was released on 21 December 2018. It was filmed at the Museu Nacional d'Art de Catalunya. In April 2019, Jain performed at Coachella. On 19 April 2019, she released the single "Gloria". The song personifies glory and describes it as something that tries to charm and divert attention from what is essential. Rolling Stone described it as "an upbeat dance track that describes the perils of fame and promotes being true to one's own creativity". On 7 June 2019, Jain performed "Gloria" as well as "Makeba" and "Heads Up" at the opening ceremony of the 2019 FIFA Women's World Cup.

=== The Fool ===
On 21 April 2023, she released her third album, The Fool.

== Discography ==
=== Albums ===
Album	Year	Peak positions							Sales	Certifications
Album	Year	FRA	BEL (WA)	BEL (FL)	CAN	ITA	SPA	SWI	Sales	Certifications
Zanaka	2015	6	4	95	51	74	68	17	Worldwide: 1,217,000; France: 500,000	SNEP: Diamond; IFPI Swiss: Gold
Souldier	2018	1	3	152	—	—	—	2	Worldwide: 258,000	SNEP: 2× Platinum
The Fool	2023	6	18	—	—	—	—	28		SNEP: Gold

=== Extended plays ===
Title	Extended play details
Hope	Released: 22 June 2015; Label: Spookland; Format: Digital download

=== Singles ===
Title	Year	Peak chart positions										Sales	Certifications	Album
Title	Year	FRA	BEL (WA)	BEL (FL)	CAN	ITA	POL	SPA	SWI	UK	WW	Sales	Certifications	Album
"Come"	2015	1	5	95	—	20	8	1	75	—	—		SNEP: Diamond; FIMI: 2× Platinum; MC: Gold; ZPAV: Platinum	Zanaka
"Makeba"	2015	7	27	—	35	49	—	—	9	52	38	World: 2,421,800	SNEP: Diamond; MC: Platinum; FIMI: Platinum; ZPAV: 3× Platinum; BPI: Silver	Zanaka
"Dynabeat"	2016	98	57	—	—	—	—	—	—	—	—			Zanaka
"Alright"	2018	6 (Note: "Alright" also peaked at number 1 on the French downloads chart.)	2	64	—	—	—	—	38	—	—	World: 539,000	SNEP: Diamond	Souldier
"Oh Man"	2018	23	9	—	—	—	—	—	—	—	—	World: 306,000	SNEP: Platinum	Souldier
"Gloria"	2019	— (Note: "Gloria" did not enter the main French chart, but peaked at number 102 on the French downloads chart.)	93	—	—	—	—	—	—	—	—			Non-album single
"The Fool"	2023	44	7	—	—	—	—	—	—	—	—		SNEP: Platinum	The Fool
"Take a Chance"	2023	—	—	—	—	—	—	—	—	—	—			The Fool
"Night Heights"	2023	—	34	—	—	—	—	—	—	—	—			The Fool
"Nobody knows"	2024	—	—	—	—	—	—	—	—	—	—			Non-album single
"Tout le monde est fou"	2025	—	—	—	—	—	—	—	—	—	—			Non-album single
"Kill It With the Beat"	2026													
"FAM"	2026													

=== Promotional singles ===
Title	Year	Peak positions		Sales	Certifications	Album
Title	Year	FRA Down.	BEL (WA)	Sales	Certifications	Album
"Heads Up"	2015	101	54	World: 202,000; France: 100,000	SNEP: Gold	Zanaka
"Hob"	2015	—	—			Zanaka
"Mr Johnson"	2016	—	—	Worldwide: 120,000+		Zanaka
"Star"	2018	—	—			Souldier
"Souldier"	2018	—	—			Souldier

=== Other charted songs ===
Title	Year	Peak positions	Album
Title	Year	FRA	Album
"Hope"	2015	87	Zanaka
"On My Way"	2018	184	Souldier

=== Other appearances ===
Title	Year	Other performer(s)	Peak positions	Album
Title	Year	Other performer(s)	BEL (WA)	Album
"L'âme au Mali"	2017	Toumani Diabaté; Sidiki Diabaté -M- Amadou & Mariam	—	Lamomali
"Kenya"	2017	Fakear	95	Karmaprana – EP
