= Come (Jain song) =

Single by Jain

from the album Zanaka
- Released: 11 May 2015
- Genre: Folk-pop
- Length: 2:42
- Songwriters: Jain, Kenan Williams
- Producer: Maxim Nucci

Jain singles chronology
"Come" (2015)	"Makeba" (2015)

Music video
- "Come" on YouTube

"Come" is a song by French singer-songwriter Jain from her debut studio album Zanaka and was also featured in NBA 2K17. It was written by Jain along with Kenan Williams, produced by Maxim Nucci and released on 11 May 2015.

== Live performances ==
Jain performed "Come" on the season final of the talent show The Voice of Italy on 23 May 2016.

== Charts ==
=== Weekly charts ===
Chart (2015–16)	Peak position
Belgium (Ultratop 50 Wallonia)	5
France (SNEP)	1
Italy (FIMI)	20
Poland Airplay (ZPAV)	8
San Marino (RTV)	2
Spain (Promusicae)	35
Switzerland (Schweizer Hitparade)	75
US Adult Alternative Airplay (Billboard)	19

=== Year-end charts ===
Chart (2016)	Position
Belgium (Ultratop Wallonia)	51
France (SNEP)	18

== Certifications ==
Region	Certification	Certified units/sales
Canada (Music Canada)	Gold	40,000^{‡}
France (SNEP)	Diamond	233,333^{‡}
Italy (FIMI)	2× Platinum	100,000^{‡}
Poland (ZPAV)	Platinum	20,000^{‡}
Spain (Promusicae)	Gold	20,000^{‡}
^{‡} Sales+streaming figures based on certification alone.
