= Vollsjö =

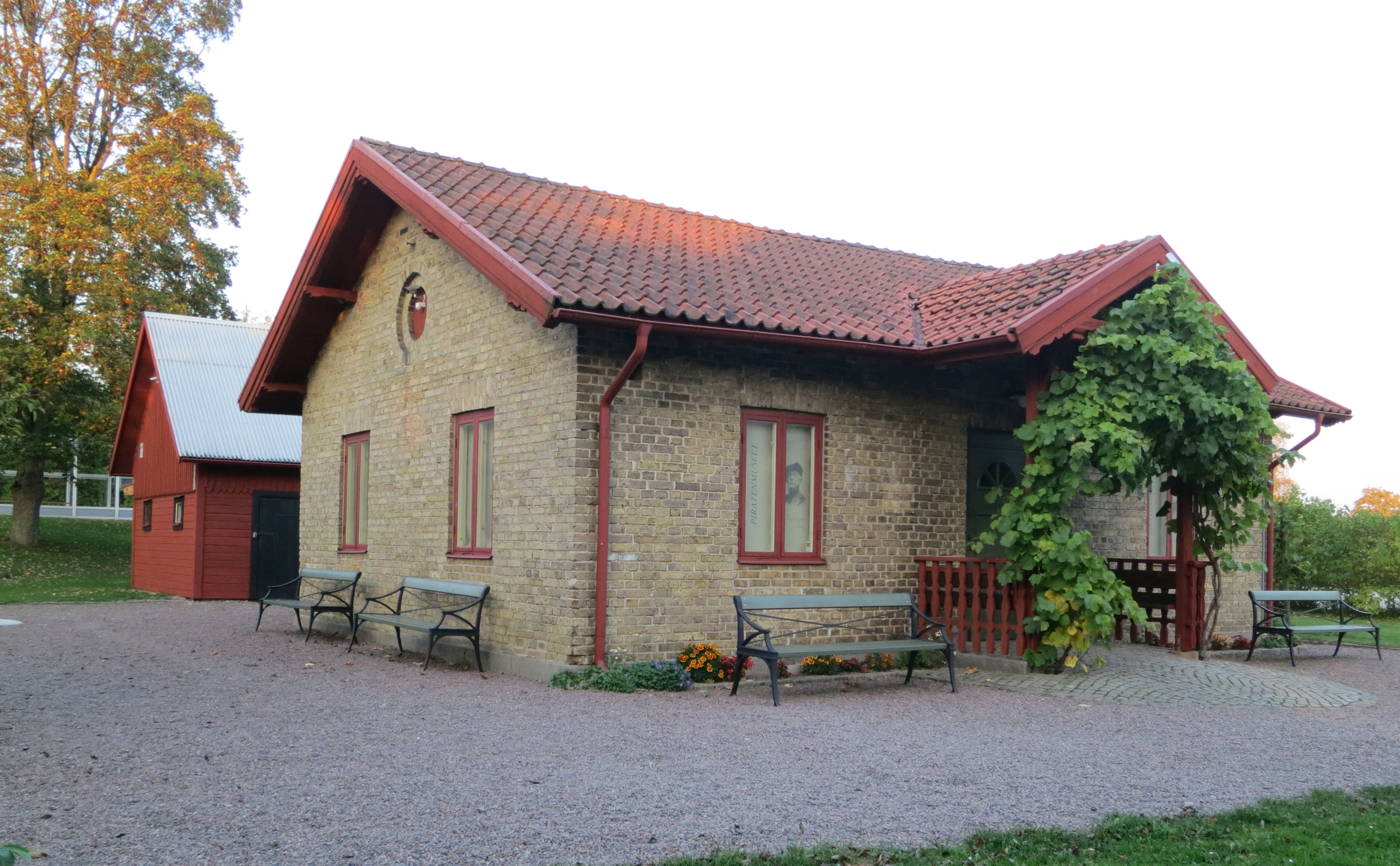
- piraten museet vollsjo.jpg

- Location within Skåne Location within Sweden
- Coordinates: 55°42′N 13°46′E
- Country: Sweden
- Province: Skåne
- County: Skåne County
- Municipality: Sjöbo Municipality

Area
  - Total: 0.95 km^{2} (0.37 sq mi)

Population (31 December 2010)
  - Total: 836
  - Density: 879/km^{2} (2,280/sq mi)
- Time zone: UTC+1 (CET)
  - Summer (DST): UTC+2 (CEST)

Vollsjö (Swedish pronunciation: [ˈvɔ̌lːɧœ]) is a locality situated in Sjöbo Municipality, Skåne County, Sweden with 836 inhabitants in 2010.
