= Darren Tulett =

English journalist and sports anchorman

- Born: 2 June 1965 (age 60); Shoreham-by-Sea, England
- Education: Manchester Polytechnic
- Occupation: Journalist
- Employer(s): Canal + beIN Sport

Darren Tulett (born 2 June 1965) is an English journalist who became a sports anchorman, presenting mainly football on French television. He was a presenter for Canal+ for a decade, and has worked for beIN Sport since helping to launch the channel in 2012.

He has been an occasional contributor to The Guardian newspaper.

== Early life ==
Tulett was born in Shoreham-by-Sea, Sussex, and grew up in Lancing, attending Boundstone School. He took various jobs after leaving school, and then studied politics and social sciences at Manchester Polytechnic for a year.

After serving on the Students Union for a year, he quit his studies and worked for a year as a barman and for a local bookmaker. On the spur of the moment, Tulett agreed to go to France with a friend and he ended up teaching English in Paris for nearly six years. He wanted to become a journalist, returned to England and, somehow, landed a job with Bloomberg News in London as a sports reporter.

== Football presenting ==
Bloomberg agreed to his request to report on the 1998 FIFA World Cup. He then remained in France, and reported for Bloomberg on football, the Tour de France and the French Open.

In 2002 he was signed up by Canal+ as a contributor on L'Équipe du Dimanche, a weekly show on football around Europe. Playing with his image as an English dandy and surfing on the popularity of Premier League football in France, Tulett was taken on full-time by Canal Plus in 2004. The first program he hosted, with Isabelle Moreau, was a light-hearted talk show called Fabulous Sport on Canal+. He reported in a lighthearted, colourful 1960s style, becoming known in France as "Darren d'Angleterre". (The Observer has called him "The French Alan Hansen", and The Daily Telegraph has called him "The Austin Powers of French Television").

In February 2012 he was recruited by beIN Sports as a star presenter for the June 2012 launch of this new sports station and went on to work on the coverage of the Champions League, Europa League and European club football. Tulett also hosted beIN's Lunch Time, a daily sports program broadcast Mondays to Fridays in the middle of the day in the early days of the station.
