= Yodelice =

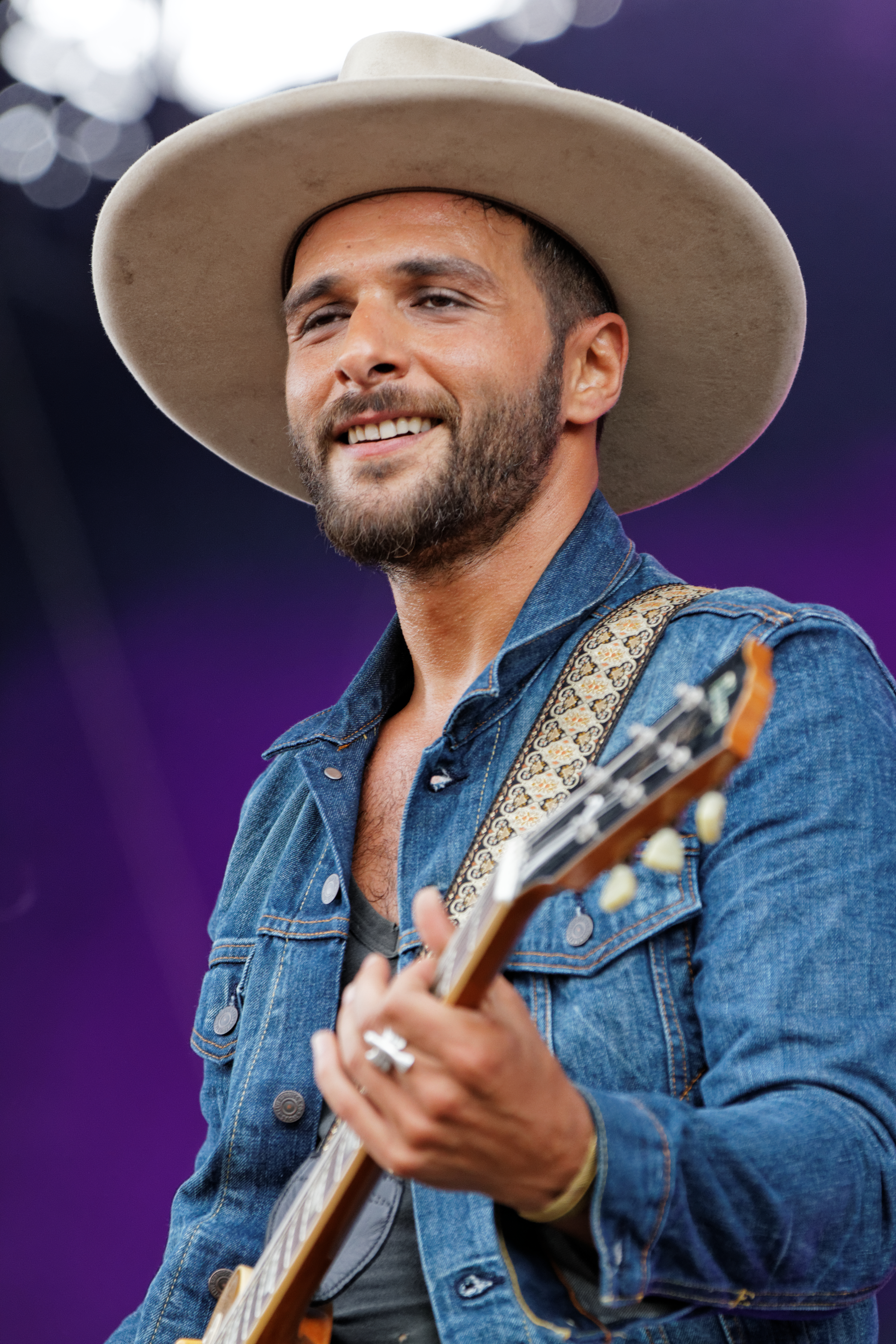
- Yodelice performing live at the Vieilles Charrues Festival, in 2014.

Background information
- Also known as: Maxim Nucci
- Born: Maxime Rodolphe Nouchy; 23 February 1979 (age 47); Créteil, Île-de-France, France
- Genres: Folk pop, pop rock
- Occupations: Musician, singer, songwriter, record producer
- Instruments: Vocals, guitar, piano
- Years active: 1996–present
- Label: Spookland (Sony Music France)
- Member of: Max

Maxime Rodolphe Nouchy (French pronunciation: [maksim ʁɔdɔlf nuʃi]; born 23 February 1979 in Créteil), known as Yodelice, is a French singer-songwriter and record producer. He has released five albums as of 2014: Maxim Nucci (2006), Tree of Life (2009), Cardioid (2010), Square Eyes (2013) and Like a Million Dreams (2014). The songs belong to folk, rock and pop music. He is also known for his acting performance in Guillaume Canet's film Little White Lies (French title: Les Petits Mouchoirs) with Marion Cotillard in 2010. The song Talk to me was featured.

== Life ==
Maxim Nucci was born in Créteil, an eastern suburb of Paris, on 23 February 1979. He entered the conservatory of music at the age of six, and learned to play the piano and the guitar. When he was 15, he began to attend classes at the Musician Institute of London. After graduation, he became the youngest teacher of the academy in 1994.

Nucci had been playing with his band, Max, in England when he sent a demo to several record labels. Universal Music France expressed interest.

He had a child with Jenifer Bartoli, the first winner of the French Star academy, in 2003. His newer partner, the French television presenter Isabelle Ithurburu, gave birth to his daughter, Mia, in 2018.

== Career ==
Nucci appeared on television during 2001. He partly composed the first album by L5–a female band created during a popular reality TV show, Popstars. He also helped the debut singers in recording their album.

His first single "Dis à l'amour".

In 2004, he starred as an actor and a composer in Alive, directed by Frédéric Berthe, in which a producer works with a gifted young songwriter and they find success together. The film was not a box-office success.

Nucci released an eponymous album in 2006.

Nucci went to Spain in the Casa Yodelice and start writing new songs, and re-emerged as Yodelice, an imaginary alter ego of Nucci.

Yodelice was awarded the best new artist prize during the 2010 Victoires de la Musique.

== Discography ==
=== Albums ===
As Maxim Nucci

Year	Album	Peak positions			Certifications
Year	Album	FRA	BEL (Wa)	SUI	Certifications
2006	Maxim Nucci	–	–	–	

As Yodelice

Year	Album	Peak positions			Certifications
Year	Album	FRA	BEL Wa	SUI	Certifications
2009	Tree of Life	11	34	84	
2010	Cardioid	9	21	38	
2013	Square Eyes	11	46	49	
2014	Like a Million Dreams	38	66	–	

=== Soundtracks ===
- 2004: Alive (soundtrack of film)
- 2021: The Deep House (soundtrack of film) : The Secret (The Promise Version)

=== Singles ===
As Maxim Nucci

Year	Single	Peak positions			Album
Year	Single	FRA	BEL Wa (Ultratop)	SUI	Album
2004	"La cour des anges"	–	63	–	
2004	"Dis à l'amour"	–	5	–	
2013	"Talk to Me"	25	–	–	

As Yodelice

Year	Single	Peak positions			Album
Year	Single	FRA	BEL Wa (Ultratop)	SUI	Album
2009	"Sunday with a Flu"	–	12	69	Cardioid
2010	"More Than Meets the Eye"	90	61	–	Cardioid
2013	"Fade Away"	72	–	–	Square Eyes

Promotional singles (as Yodelice)

- 2009: "Free"
- 2010: "Emergency"
