= List of top 10 singles in 2016 (France) =

This is a list of singles that have peaked in the top 10 of the French Singles Chart in 2016. 86 singles were in the top 10 this year of which 24 were on the number-one spot.

== Top 10 singles ==
| Artist(s) | Single | Peak | Peak date | Ref. |
|---|---|---|---|---|
| Michel Delpech | "Quand j'étais chanteur" | 10 | 8 January | |
| David Bowie | "Heroes" | 9 | 15 January | |
| David Bowie | "Life on Mars" | 3 | 15 January | |
| David Bowie | "Space Oddity" | 1 | 15 January | |
| Maître Gims | "Tu vas me manquer" | 6 | 22 January | |
| Feder featuring Emmi | "Blind" | 5 | 22 January | |
| Yall featuring Gabriela Richardson | "Hundred Miles" | 2 | 22 January | |
| Matt Simons | "Catch & Release" (Deepend Remix) | 1 | 22 January | |
| Renaud | "Toujours debout" | 1 | 29 January | |
| Booba | "JDC" | 10 | 5 February | |
| Zayn | "Pillowtalk" | 4 | 5 February | |
| Rihanna featuring Drake | "Work" | 1 | 5 February | |
| Jul | "My World" | 10 | 12 February | |
| Kendji Girac and Soprano | "No Me Mires Más" | 7 | 12 February | |
| Julian Perretta | "Miracle" | 5 | 12 February | |
| Justin Bieber | "Love Yourself" | 4 | 12 February | |
| Kids United | "On écrit sur les murs" | 3 | 12 February | |
| Jain | "Come" | 1 | 19 February | |
| Christophe Maé | "Il est où le bonheur" | 4 | 26 February | |
| Twenty One Pilots | "Stressed Out" | 2 | 4 March | |
| Alan Walker | "Faded" | 1 | 4 March | |
| Jul | "Le patron" | 10 | 11 March | |
| Jul | "Elle te balade" | 3 | 11 March | |
| G-Eazy and Bebe Rexha | "Me, Myself & I" | 9 | 17 March | |
| Coldplay | "Hymn for the Weekend" | 3 | 17 March | |
| Kungs vs. Cookin' on 3 Burners | "This Girl" | 1 | 1 April | |
| Lukas Graham | "7 Years" | 5 | 8 April | |
| Mike Posner | "I Took a Pill in Ibiza" | 6 | 15 April | |
| Drake featuring Wizkid and Kyla | "One Dance" | 1 | 15 April | |
| Nehuda featuring Cris Cab | "Paradise" | 3 | 22 April | |
| Prince | "Cream" | 8 | 29 April | |
| Prince | "Kiss" | 2 | 29 April | |
| Prince | "Purple Rain" | 1 | 29 April | |
| Calvin Harris featuring Rihanna | "This Is What You Came For" | 5 | 6 May | |
| Sia | "Cheap Thrills" | 1 | 6 May | |
| Booba | "Salside" | 8 | 20 May | |
| Amir | "J'ai cherché" | 2 | 20 May | |
| Justin Timberlake | "Can't Stop the Feeling!" | 1 | 20 May | |
| Slimane | "Paname" | 10 | 27 May | |
| Céline Dion | "Encore un soir" | 1 | 27 May | |
| Deorro featuring Elvis Crespo | "Bailar" | 7 | 10 June | |
| David Guetta featuring Zara Larsson | "This One's for You" | 1 | 17 June | |
| Jenifer | "Paradis secret" | 7 | 24 June | |
| Damso and Booba | "Paris c'est loin" | 4 | 22 July | |
| Katy Perry | "Rise" | 3 | 22 July | |
| Major Lazer featuring Justin Bieber and MØ | "Cold Water" | 2 | 29 July | |
| Booba | "E.L.E.P.H.A.N.T." | 1 | 29 July | |
| Soprano | "Le diable ne s'habille plus en Prada" | 10 | 5 August | |
| Møme featuring Merryn Jeann | "Aloha" | 9 | 5 August | |
| Claudio Capéo | "Un homme debout" | 6 | 5 August | |
| L.E.J | "Summer 2016" | 5 | 12 August | |
| DJ Snake featuring Justin Bieber | "Let Me Love You" | 1 | 12 August | |
| Baptiste Giabiconi | "Love to Love You Baby" | 4 | 19 August | |
| Enrique Iglesias featuring Wisin | "Duele el Corazón" | 3 | 19 August | |
| Imany | "Don't Be So Shy" | 1 | 26 August | |
| Álvaro Soler | "Sofia" | 9 | 2 September | |
| M. Pokora | "Cette année-là" | 7 | 2 September | |
| Charlie Puth featuring Selena Gomez | "We Don't Talk Anymore" | 8 | 9 September | |
| Sia featuring Kendrick Lamar | "The Greatest" | 3 | 16 September | |
| Lady Gaga | "Perfect Illusion" | 1 | 16 September | |
| Niska and Maître Gims | "Elle avait son djo" | 9 | 23 September | |
| Calvin Harris | "My Way" | 4 | 23 September | |
| PNL | "Naha" | 2 | 23 September | |
| LP | "Lost on You" | 1 | 23 September | |
| Kungs featuring Jamie N Commons | "Don't You Know" | 4 | 30 September | |
| The Weeknd featuring Daft Punk | "Starboy" | 1 | 30 September | |
| Feder featuring Alex Aiono | "Lordly" | 10 | 7 October | |
| Booba | "DKR" | 1 | 7 October | |
| Bruno Mars | "24K Magic" | 1 | 14 October | |
| Soprano | "En feu" | 4 | 21 October | |
| Julien Doré | "Le lac" | 1 | 21 October | |
| Richard Orlinski and Eva Simons | "Heartbeat" | 1 | 28 October | |
| Kungs featuring Ephemerals | "I Feel So Bad" | 3 | 11 November | |
| Leonard Cohen | "Suzanne" | 3 | 18 November | |
| Leonard Cohen | "Hallelujah" | 1 | 18 November | |
| Twenty One Pilots | "Heathens" | 4 | 25 November | |
| Jul | "Tchikita" | 3 | 25 November | |
| Rae Sremmurd featuring Gucci Mane | "Black Beatles" | 2 | 25 November | |
| Rag'n'Bone Man | "Human" | 2 | 2 December | |
| Fally Ipupa and Booba | "Kiname" | 10 | 9 December | |
| Nekfeu | "Mauvaise graine" | 7 | 9 December | |
| Steve Aoki and Louis Tomlinson | "Just Hold On" | 8 | 16 December | |
| Cyril Hanouna and Amine | "Petit Baba Noël" | 2 | 16 December | |
| Mariah Carey | "All I Want for Christmas Is You" | 1 | 23 December | |
| Wham! | "Last Christmas" | 8 | 30 December | |
| George Michael | "Careless Whisper" | 7 | 30 December | |

== Entries by artists ==
The following table shows artists who achieved two or more top 10 entries in 2016. The figures include both main artists and featured artists and the peak position in brackets.

| Entries | Artist | Singles |
|---|---|---|
| 6 | Booba | "JDC" (10), "Salside" (8)", "Paris c'est loin" (4), "E.L.E.P.H.A.N.T." (1), "DKR" (1), "Kiname" (10) |
| 4 | Jul | "My World" (10), "Le patron" (10)", "Elle te ballade" (3), "Tchikita" (3) |
| 3 | David Bowie | "Heroes" (9), "Life on Mars" (3), "Space Oddity" (1) |
| 3 | Justin Bieber | "Love Yourself" (4), "Cold Water" (2), "Let Me Love You" (1) |
| 3 | Kungs | "This Girl" (1), "Don't You Know" (4), "I Feel So Bad" (3), |
| 3 | Prince | "Cream" (8), "Kiss" (2), "Purple Rain" (1) |
| 3 | Soprano | "No Me Mires Más" (7), "En feu" (4), "Le diable ne s'habille plus en Prada" (10), |
| 2 | Calvin Harris | "This Is What You Came For" (5), "My Way" (4), |
| 2 | Drake | "Work" (1), "One Dance" (1), |
| 2 | Feder | "Blind" (5), "Lordly" (10) |
| 2 | Leonard Cohen | "Hallelujah (1), "Suzanne" (3) |
| 2 | Maître Gims | "Tu vas me manquer" (6), "Elle avait son djo" (9), |
| 2 | Rihanna | "Work" (1), "This Is What You Came For" (5), |
| 2 | Sia | "Cheap Thrills" (1), "The Greatest" (3) |
| 2 | Twenty One Pilots | "Stressed Out" (2), "Heathens" (4), |

== See also ==
- 2016 in French music
- List of number-one hits of 2016 (France)
