= List of top 10 singles in 2018 (France) =

This is a list of singles that have peaked in the top 10 of the French Singles Chart in 2018. 110 singles reached the top ten this year with 17 peaking at number one.

== Top-ten singles ==
Artist(s)	Single	Peak	Peak date	Ref.
Lartiste	"Catchu Catchu"	7	5 January	
France Gall	"La déclaration d'amour"	9	12 January	
France Gall	"Il jouait du piano debout"	6	12 January	
France Gall	"Ella, elle l'a"	4	12 January	
France Gall	"Évidemment"	3	12 January	
France Gall	"Résiste"	2	12 January	
The Cranberries	"Zombie"	3	19 January	
Mylène Farmer	"Rolling Stone"	1	26 January	
Sena Kana	"Truth or Dare"	1	2 February	
Justin Timberlake featuring Chris Stapleton	"Say Something"	7	9 February	
Big Boi	"All Night"	4	9 February	
MC Fioti featuring Future, J Balvin, Stefflon Don and Juan Magán	"Bum Bum Tam Tam"	3	9 February	
Juliette Armanet	"L'amour en solitaire"	8	16 February	
Bigflo & Oli	"Dommage"	3	16 February	
Liam Payne and Rita Ora	"For You"	1	16 February	
Labrinth	"Jealous"	9	23 February	
Muse	"Thought Contagion"	7	23 February	
Drake	"God's Plan"	4	23 February	
Grand Corps Malade	"Dimanche soir"	1	23 February	
Bengous	"Ou tié bébé"	6	2 March	
Radiohead	"Creep"	4	9 March	
Luis Fonsi and Demi Lovato	"Échame la Culpa"	3	9 March	
Tom Walker	"Leave a Light On"	1	9 March	
Les Enfoirés	"On fait le show"	5	16 March	
Maître Gims and Sofiane	"Loup garou"	3	16 March	
Maître Gims and Vianney	"La même"	1	16 March	
Feder	"Breathe"	10	23 March	
Vitaa and Claudio Capéo	"Un peu de rêve"	6	23 March	
Dadju	"Bob Marley"	3	23 March	
Marwa Loud	"Fallait pas"	10	30 March	
Maître Gims and Super Sako featuring Hayko	"Mi Gna"	4	30 March	
David Guetta and Sia	"Flames"	2	30 March	
Booba	"Gotham"	2	6 April	
Jacques Higelin	"Higelin tombe du ciel"	3	13 April	
Lartiste featuring Caroliina	"Mafiosa"	2	13 April	
Orelsan and Stromae	"La pluie"	10	20 April	
Nicky Jam and J Balvin	"X"	4	20 April	
L'Algérino	"Va bene"	3	20 April	
Kendji Girac	"Maria Maria"	7	27 April	
Avicii	"Wake Me Up"	6	27 April	
Ariana Grande	"No Tears Left to Cry"	3	27 April	
Stromae	"Défiler"	7	4 May	
Bad Wolves	"Zombie"	6	4 May	
Damso	"Ipséité"	3	4 May	
Maurane	"Sur un prélude de Bach"	3	11 May	
Dosseh	"Habitué"	9	18 May	
Berlin featuring El Profesor	"Bella ciao"	4	18 May	
Madame Monsieur	"Mercy"	2	18 May	
Christine and the Queens featuring Dâm-Funk	"Damn, dis-moi"	7	25 May	
Naestro featuring Maître Gims, Vitaa, Dadju and Slimane	"Bella ciao"	1	25 May	
Hoshi	"Ta marinière"	8	22 June	
Cecilia Krull	"My Life Is Going On"	7	22 June	
Aya Nakamura	"Djadja"	6	22 June	
PNL	"À l'ammoniaque"	3	29 June	
Mylène Farmer and LP	"N'oublie pas"	1	29 June	
Bigflo & Oli and Petit Biscuit	"Demain"	5	6 July	
Calvin Harris and Dua Lipa	"One Kiss"	2	6 July	
Big Ali and Busta Rhymes featuring R-Wan	"Bottles Up"	10	13 July	
Jul	"Toto et Ninetta"	6	13 July	
AM La Scampia featuring Lacrim	"Maradona"	5	13 July	
Magic System featuring Chawki	"Magic in the Air"	4	20 July	
Gloria Gaynor	"I Will Survive"	2	20 July	
Hermes House Band	"I Will Survive"	1	20 July	
Sofiane featuring Vald, Mac Tyer, Soolking, Kalash Criminel, Sadek and Heuss l'Enfoiré	"Woah"	5	3 August	
Dennis Lloyd	"Nevermind"	9	10 August	
Clean Bandit featuring Demi Lovato	"Solo"	3	10 August	
Maroon 5 featuring Cardi B	"Girls Like You"	1	10 August	
PNL	"91's"	1	17 August	
Aretha Franklin	"I Say a Little Prayer"	7	24 August	
Aretha Franklin	"Respect"	6	24 August	
LSD	"Thunderclouds"	2	24 August	
Jain	"Alright"	1	24 August	
BTS	"Idol"	10	31 August	
Jenifer	"Notre idylle"	7	31 August	
Dynoro and Gigi D'Agostino	"In My Mind"	2	31 August	
SCH	"Otto"	10	7 September	
Kendji Girac	"Pour oublier"	6	7 September	
Trois Cafés Gourmands	"À nos souvenirs"	2	7 September	
Lenny Kravitz	"Low"	9	14 September	
Zazie	"Speed"	2	14 September	
Vegedream	"Ramenez la coupe à la maison"	1	14 September	
Suprême NTM and Sofiane	"Sur le drapeau"	3	21 September	
Nehuda	"Même d'aussi loin"	8	28 September	
Calvin Harris and Sam Smith	"Promises"	1	28 September	
Charles Aznavour	"Hier encore"	9	5 October	
Booba	"BB"	6	5 October	
Charles Aznavour	"La Bohème"	4	5 October	
Charles Aznavour	"Emmenez-moi"	3	5 October	
Lady Gaga and Bradley Cooper	"Shallow"	1	5 October	
Dadju	"Jaloux"	5	12 October	
Lady Gaga	"I'll Never Love Again"	3	12 October	
Johnny Hallyday	"Mon pays c'est l'amour"	10	26 October	
Johnny Hallyday	"Pardonne-moi"	3	26 October	
Johnny Hallyday	"J'en parlerai au Diable"	1	26 October	
The Prince Karma	"Later Bitches"	7	2 November	
DJ Snake featuring Selena Gomez, Ozuna and Cardi B	"Taki Taki"	6	2 November	
Eva	"Mood"	5	2 November	
R-Wan featuring Lukas	"Secret"	10	9 November	
Queen	"Bohemian Rhapsody"	3	9 November	
Imagine Dragons	"Natural"	9	16 November	
David Hallyday	"Ma dernière lettre"	7	16 November	
Amir	"Longtemps"	3	16 November	
I.K (TLF) featuring Lartiste	"Ella"	10	23 November	
Orelsan featuring Damso	"Rêves bizarres"	7	23 November	
Vitaa and Slimane	"Je te le donne"	3	23 November	
Médine featuring Booba	"KYLL"	4	7 December	
Patrick Fiori	"Les gens qu'on aime"	10	14 December	
Redbone	"Come and Get Your Love"	1	21 December	

== Entries by artists ==
The following table shows artists who achieved two or more top 10 entries in 2018. The figures include both main artists and featured artists and the peak position in brackets.

Entries	Artist	Songs
5	France Gall	"Ella, elle l'a" (4), "Évidemment" (3), "Il jouait du piano debout" (6), "La déclaration d'amour" (9), "Résiste" (2)
4	Maître Gims	"Bella ciao" (1), "La même" (1), "Loup garou" (3), "Mi Gna" (4)
3	Booba	"BB" (6), "Gotham" (2), "KYLL" (4)
3	Charles Aznavour	"La Bohème" (4), "Emmenez-moi" (3), "Hier encore" (9)
3	Dadju	"Bella ciao" (1), "Bob Marley" (3), "Jaloux" (5)
3	Johnny Hallyday	"J'en parlerai au Diable" (1), "Mon pays c'est l'amour" (10), "Pardonne-moi" (3)
3	Lartiste	"Catchu Catchu" (7), "Ella" (10), "Mafiosa" (2)
3	Sofiane	"Loup garou" (3), "Sur le drapeau" (3), "Woah" (5)
3	Vitaa	"Bella ciao" (1), "Je te le donne" (3), "Un peu de rêve" (6)
2	Aretha Franklin	"I Say a Little Prayer" (7), "Respect" (6)
2	Bigflo & Oli	"Dommage" (3), "Demain" (5),
2	Bradley Cooper	"I'll Never Love Again" (3), "Shallow" (1)
2	Calvin Harris	"One Kiss" (2), "Promises" (1)
2	Cardi B	"Girls Like You" (1), "Taki Taki" (6)
2	Damso	"Ipséité" (3), "Rêves bizarres" (7)
2	Demi Lovato	"Échame la Culpa" (3), "Solo" (3)
2	J Balvin	"Bum Bum Tam Tam" (3), "X" (4)
2	Kendji Girac	"Maria Maria" (7), "Pour oublier" (6)
2	Labrinth	"Jealous" (9), "Thunderclouds" (2)
2	Lady Gaga	"I'll Never Love Again" (3), "Shallow" (1)
2	Mylène Farmer	"N'oublie pas" (1), "Rolling Stone" (1)
2	Orelsan	"La pluie" (10), "Rêves bizarres" (7)
2	PNL	"À l'ammoniaque" (3)", "91's" (1),
2	R-Wan	"Bottles Up" (10), "Secret" (10)
2	Sia	"Flames" (2), "Thunderclouds" (2)
2	Slimane	"Bella ciao" (1), "Je te le donne" (3)
2	Stromae	"Défiler" (7), "La pluie" (10)

== See also ==
- 2018 in music
- List of number-one hits of 2018 (France)
