= Always Remember Us This Way =

2018 song by Lady Gaga

Single by Lady Gaga

from the album A Star Is Born
- Released: January 4, 2019
- Studio: EastWest (Los Angeles)
- Venue: Coachella Valley Music and Arts Festival
- Genre: Country
- Length: 3:30; 3:26 (radio edit)
- Label: Interscope
- Songwriters: Lady Gaga; Natalie Hemby; Hillary Lindsey; Lori McKenna
- Producers: Dave Cobb; Lady Gaga

Lady Gaga singles chronology
"Shallow" (2018)	"Always Remember Us This Way" (2019)	"I'll Never Love Again" (2019)

Music video
- "Always Remember Us This Way" on YouTube

Always Remember Us This Way is a song by American singer Lady Gaga from the 2018 film A Star Is Born and its soundtrack. Written by Gaga, Natalie Hemby, Hillary Lindsey, and Lori McKenna, and produced by Gaga with Dave Cobb, the piano-driven country ballad was inspired by 1970s music and recorded at Coachella and EastWest Studios in Los Angeles. In the film, Gaga performs it as her character, Ally, in a concert scene that marks a key moment in the character's artistic rise. The song was released to radio in Italy and France in January 2019 as the soundtrack's second single in those territories.

"Always Remember Us This Way" was critically praised for its emotional intensity, melodic warmth, and Gaga's vocal performance, being regarded by several reviewers as one of the soundtrack's standout tracks. It was nominated for Song of the Year at the 62nd Annual Grammy Awards, becoming the second track from A Star Is Born to receive a nomination in that category after "Shallow". Commercially, the song topped the chart in Iceland and reached the top ten in Belgium, Hungary, Ireland, Norway, Portugal, Scotland, Sweden, and Switzerland, while receiving diamond certifications in Brazil, France, and Poland. In 2022, Gaga performed the song during her stadium tour The Chromatica Ball, while in 2025–2026, she included it in FireAid and select concerts in promotion of her album Mayhem.

== Background and release ==
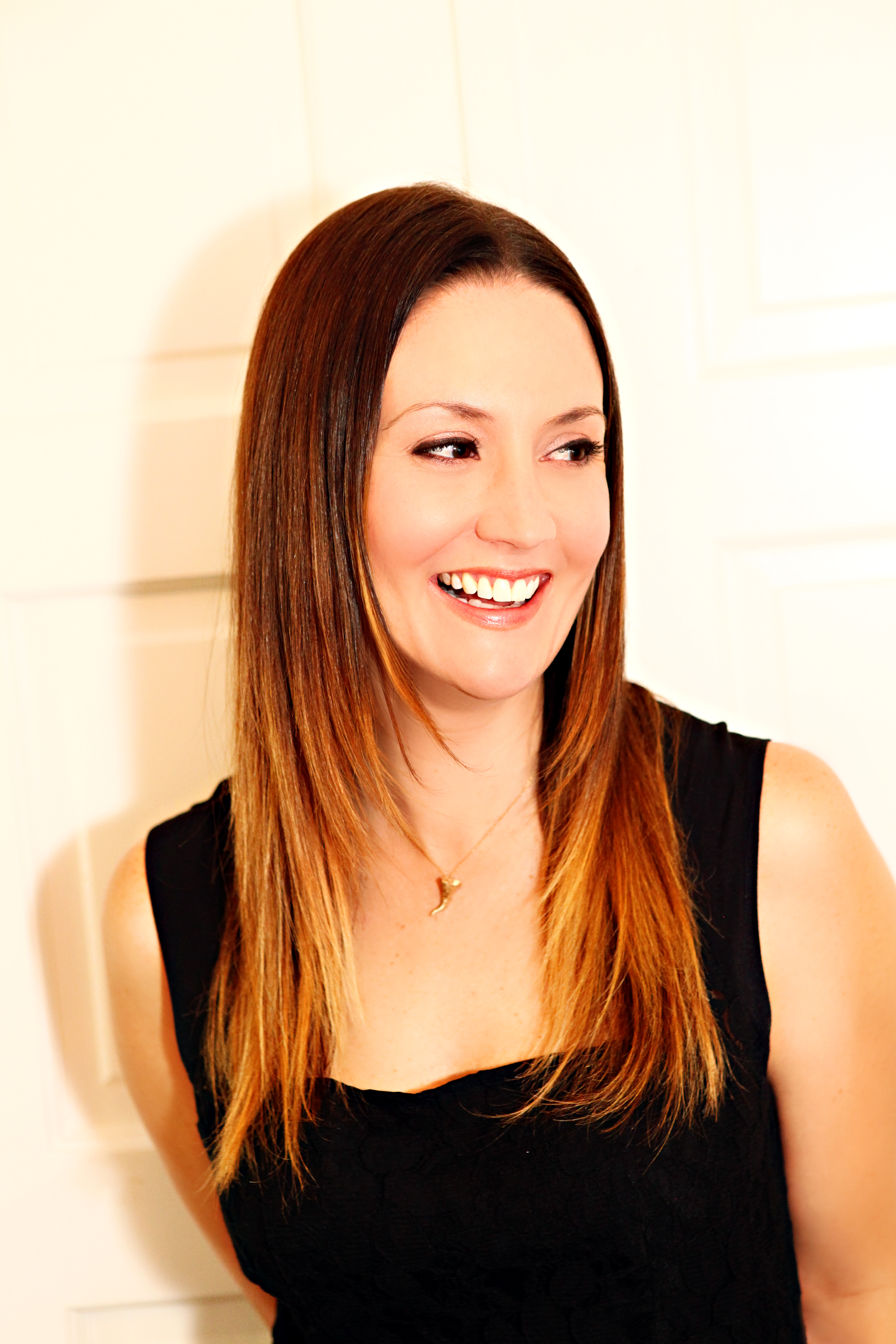
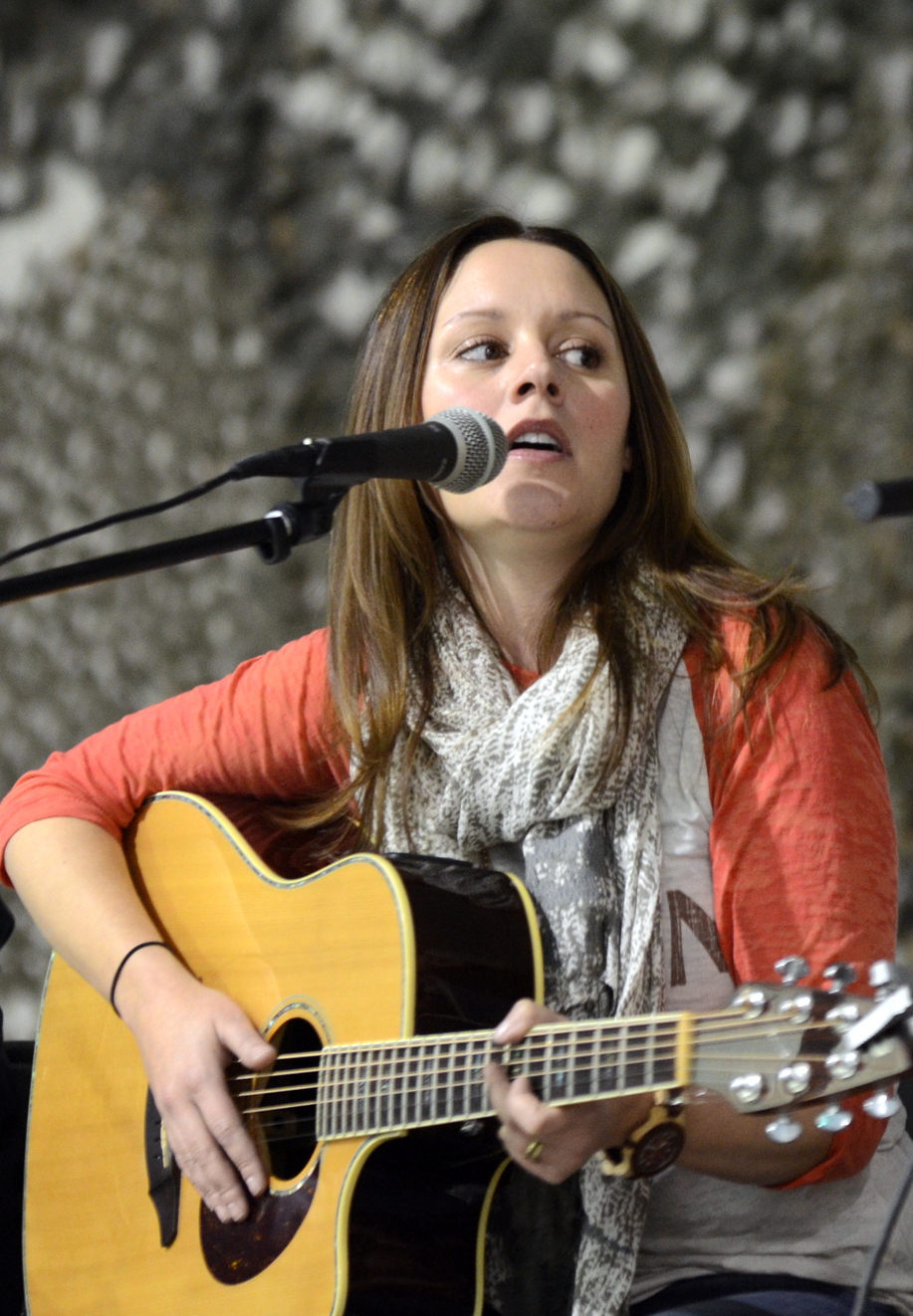
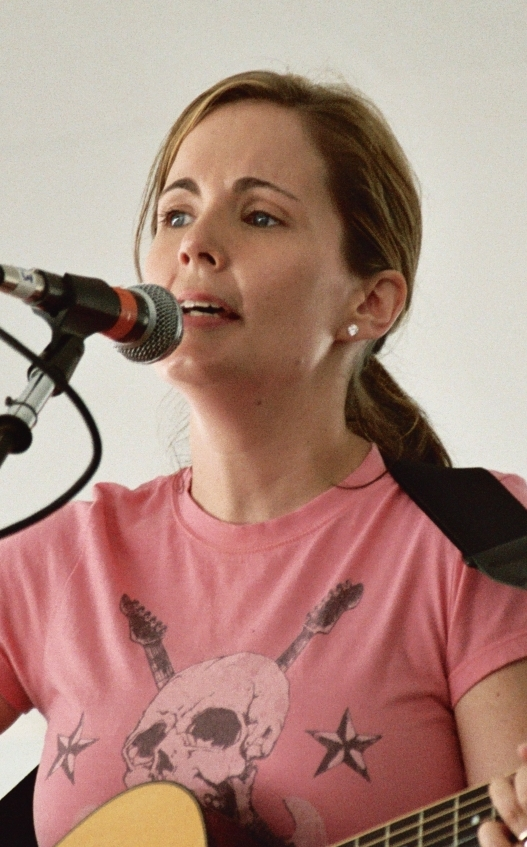
Lady Gaga co-wrote the track with Natalie Hemby, Hillary Lindsey, and Lori McKenna (pictured left to right).

"Always Remember Us This Way" was written by Lady Gaga, Natalie Hemby, Hillary Lindsey, and Lori McKenna, and produced by Dave Cobb and Gaga for the 2018 film A Star Is Born and its soundtrack. In the film, Ally (played by Gaga) performs the song during a concert with Jackson Maine (portrayed by Bradley Cooper); the performance precedes music producer Rez's approach to her and foreshadows her solo breakthrough. The track was released to Italian radio on January 4, 2019, followed by release to French radio two weeks later.

Bradley Cooper, who also directed the film, approached Cobb for crafting the sound of the album, after listening to the latter's work. Cobb flew out to Los Angeles and met Gaga and Cooper for a writing session. He played the track "Maybe It's Time" (written by singer-songwriter Jason Isbell), which impressed Gaga and Cooper and set the tone for the soundtrack. They then asked Hemby, Lindsey and McKenna to come down to Los Angeles and start composing tracks.

A music video for the song was released on November 8, 2018, showing the sequence from the film when Ally sings the track after being introduced by Jackson onstage, who sweetly tells her, "I love you, I'll always remember us this way". A vertical-shaped version of the clip was released to Spotify. Brooke Bajgrowicz from Billboard described the video as "reflective", noting that it showed Ally and Jackson's developing romance, while interspersed with scenes of the couple going on a motorbike ride, kissing in a parking lot, and performing music together. The clip ends with the crowd chanting Ally's name, and Jackson walks over to embrace her.

== Writing and production ==
Producer Dave Cobb recalled the recording session as "pure magic".

McKenna described the songwriting as a powerful moment because the lyrics made them all tearful, and they decided that if "Maybe It's Time" was Cooper's character Jackson's song, then "Always Remember Us This Way" belonged with Ally. She later recalled that the script was changing constantly while they were writing for the film, so the writers did not yet know the exact scene for which the song would be used, and she could not remember whether the title phrase came from the script or was introduced during the writing session, possibly by Gaga. She said that she sat on the studio floor while Hemby and Lindsey took turns at the piano before Gaga joined them, and that the four women "sat there and wrote that song and cried", describing it as "a good girl session". McKenna said she was surprised the song remained in the film because of how much the script kept evolving. She also praised Gaga's collaborative approach during the session, saying that the singer was "so trusting" and "really was a team player" despite her stature.

"Always Remember Us This Way" was recorded immediately after the songwriters finished composing it. They also provided backing vocals as Gaga recorded her vocals in the studio. Cobb described the recording session as "pure magic", praising the energy in the studio and the experience of hearing Gaga's voice through headphones. He recalled that "all of us had goosebumps" and that such a reaction "happens very seldomly". Lindsey, who had previously collaborated with Gaga on her fifth studio album, Joanne (2016), recalled that the singer had fully immersed herself in the character of Ally. She described Gaga as deeply affected by the character's grief over losing Jackson, to the point that the other songwriters wanted to comfort her.

== Music and lyrical content ==
"Always Remember Us This Way"
A 19-second sample from the song, showcasing its piano-driven arrangement, the addition of guitars in the second chorus, and Gaga's soaring vocal delivery.

"Always Remember Us This Way" is a piano-driven country ballad, inspired by the music of the 1970s, and features Gaga's raw, powerful vocals. Her performance moves from the soft, whispering opening lines to a heroic belt in the chorus. Following the first verse being on piano, the guitars and drums kick in from the second verse and Gaga's vocals build up to the final chorus uttering the lines, "When the sun goes down/ And the band won't play/ I'll always remember us this way." The song is composed in the time signature of common time and is performed in the key of A minor with a slow tempo of 65 beats per minute. It follows a chord progression of Am–F–C–G, and the vocals span from G_{3} to E_{5}.

Writing for American Songwriter, Alex Hopper interpreted the song as reflecting on the early days of a relationship in the wake of its end, with the narrator asking to be remembered fondly. The narrator thanks her partner for revealing a light within her she had not known was there, and looks back with gratitude as the relationship fades. She added that the lyrics evoke Jackson and Ally's shared musical life, referring to them as poets who "don't know how to rhyme", and argued that the song mirrors their relationship in A Star Is Born, with Jackson recognizing Ally’s star potential and Ally ultimately remembering him with love rather than bitterness after his death. Alyssa Bereznak of The Ringer similarly described the song as "a vivid supercut of the couple's journey", interpreting it as an allusion to the peak of Jackson and Ally's romantic and creative relationship. The Washington Post's Bethonie Butler highlighted the song's references to the characters' geographic roots, citing the lines "That Arizona sky / burning in your eyes" and "buried in my soul, like California gold".

== Reception ==
=== Critical response ===
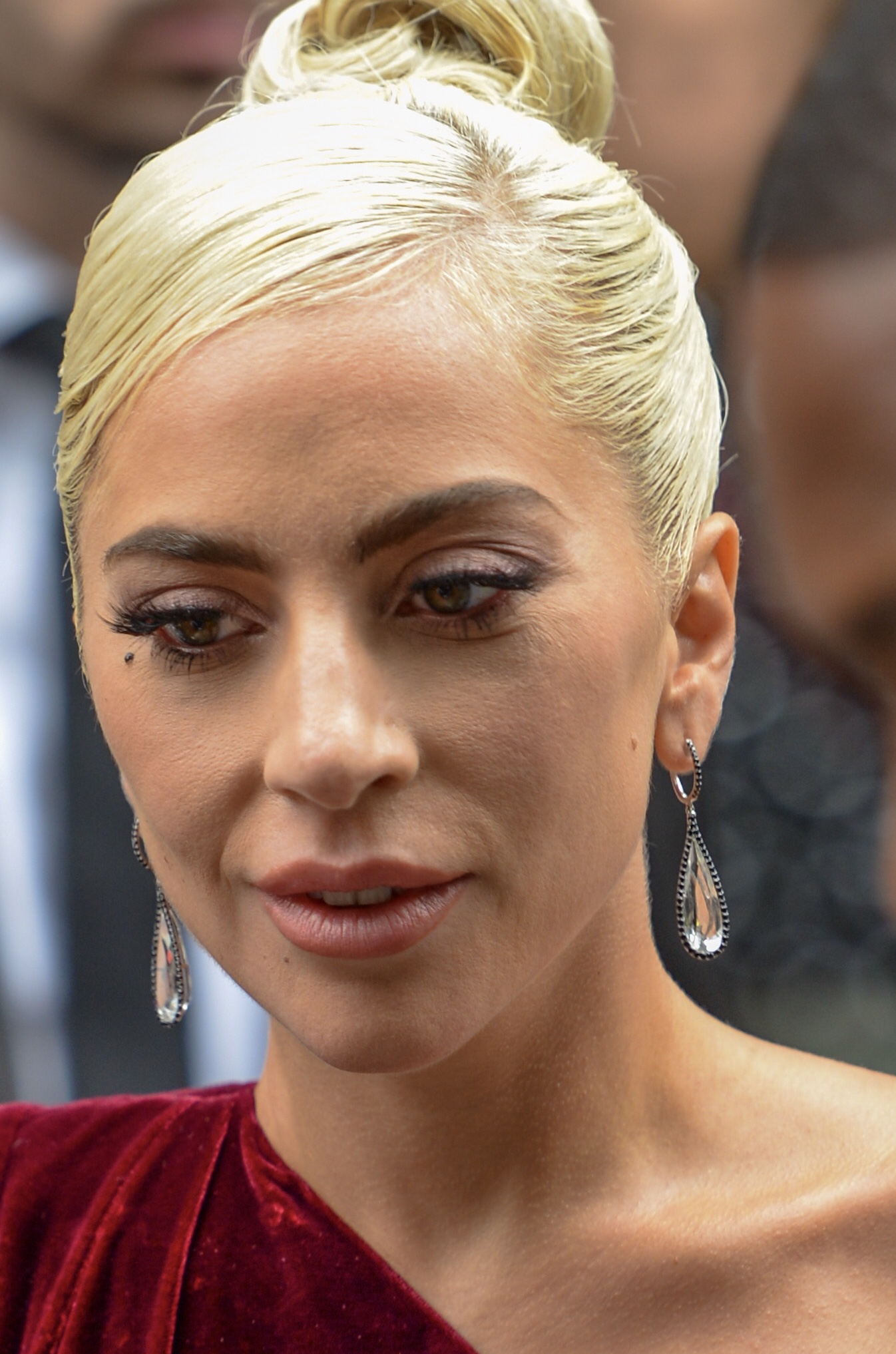
Gaga at the 2018 Toronto International Film Festival during the promotional rollout for A Star Is Born; critics praised her vocals in the song.

Upon release, "Always Remember Us This Way" was widely praised by critics. Jon Pareles of The New York Times described the song as a "hushed-to-heroic", Elton John-inspired "showstopper". Rolling Stone's Brittany Spanos and The Washington Post's Emily Yahr called the song "explosive" and "haunting", respectively. USA Today's Patrick Ryan said the song "ranks up there with 2009's 'Speechless' and 2013's 'Dope' as one of Gaga's best ballads". Natalie Walker of Vulture thought that "this song really illuminates what a virtuosic vocal chameleon Gaga is", and compared aspects of the track to Lorde's "Liability" (2017) and the songs of Adele. Vulture's Kristen S. Hé wrote that the song "sounds like vintage Carole King, with a hint of modern Nashville", adding that it "charms you over multiple listens with its warm, familiar delivery"; similarly, Adam White of The Independent felt that its "gorgeous melodies" make it "easy to return to over and over again".

Maureen Lee Lenker of Entertainment Weekly picked "Always Remember Us This Way" as the soundtrack's best track, calling it as "a poem in its own right, evocative and elegiac" and a "showcase for Gaga's powerhouse voice". Alex Ungerman of Entertainment Tonight likewise singled it out as an album highlight, praising its emotional force, melancholy sense of finality, and Gaga's full-throated vocal performance; he also suggested it would have been a more fitting closing song for the film than "I'll Never Love Again". The Guardian's Michael Cragg called it Gaga's "finest ballad", writing that, "like most of her best songs, it was written and recorded quickly", with the "creases and scuffs" in her vocals heightening the emotion of the delicate pre-chorus before she finds "more solid ground" in the "gorgeous" chorus.

Alyssa Bereznak of The Ringer described "Always Remember Us This Way" as Ally's defining ballad, praising its poetic piano-driven style and Gaga's "fearless, unwavering voice", and suggesting that Gaga had found in her character the inspiration she had been missing on Joanne. Carl Wilson of Slate expressed a similar view, writing that "this is the song she was searching for on Joanne". He likened Gaga to "a fearless vocal assassin", arguing that her performance would impress those who remembered her primarily for her meat dress and placed her among the leading contemporary pop singers. Jeremy Winogard of Slant Magazine thought that the song "allow[s] Gaga to flex her pipes". The Plain Dealer's Joey Morona wrote, "Her considerable vocal prowess and control are ... on full display on the heartfelt slow jam".

The Daily Telegraph's Neil McCormick considered "I'll Never Love Again" and "Always Remember Us This Way" Gaga's best solo tracks on the album, writing that although they are "clichéd, sentimental and old-fashioned", they are delivered with enough "conviction and vocal drama" to show that Gaga "has the star power to go supernova in any musical era". Maeve McDermott of the Chicago Sun-Times wrote that "Always Remember Us This Way" was the soundtrack's "most intriguing entry", and Pitchfork's Larry Fitzmaurice listed it as one of the album's best, calling it "unabashedly sentimental", though he felt the soundtrack recording could not fully reproduce the emotional impact of Gaga performing the song in the film.

=== Accolades ===
"Always Remember Us This Way" received nominations for Song of the Year at the 62nd Annual Grammy Awards and Record Production/Single or Track at the 2020 TEC Awards, but lost both to Billie Eilish's "Bad Guy".

== Commercial performance ==
Following the soundtrack's release, "Always Remember Us This Way" debuted at number-two on the US Digital Songs chart. The song consecutively debuted at number 41 on the Billboard Hot 100, along with four other tracks from the album charting. It was present on the chart for a total of nine weeks. The track debuted at number 32 on the Canadian Hot 100, while entering their Digital Songs chart at number-two. In Australia, the song entered the ARIA Singles Chart at number 18, and by next week reached a peak of number 12. The Australian Recording Industry Association (ARIA) certified it nine-times platinum for selling over 630,000 units in the country. Similarly in New Zealand, the song entered the singles chart at number 39, and after a few weeks reached a peak of number 14. The Recorded Music NZ (RMNZ) certified it seven-times platinum for selling over 210,000 units in the country.

"Always Remember Us This Way" entered the UK Singles Chart at number 39 with sales of 11,029 units on the chart dated October 12, 2018. By its third week on the chart, the track had moved up to reach a peak of number 25 while selling 16,815 units, being present within the top 100 for eleven weeks. As of February 2025, the song has sold 1.6 million copies in the UK with 189 million streams, and has since been certified double platinum by the British Phonographic Industry (BPI).

In Ireland, the song reached number three on the chart in its third week. That same week first single "Shallow" held the top-spot on the Irish Singles Chart, while fellow album track "I'll Never Love Again" also reached the top-ten. "Always Remember Us This Way" also reached the top-ten of the charts in Scotland, Sweden and Switzerland (number-one in the French-speaking part of Romandie), in the latter two in the same week, as well as in Belgium (both Flanders and Wallonia), Hungary, Norway, and Portugal, the digital charts of Luxembourg, Slovakia, and the combined European chart. The song charted within the top twenty in Denmark, Estonia, France, Malaysia, and on the digital chart of Czech Republic, top thirty in Austria, Singapore, and the Netherlands, and the top forty in Italy.

In October 2026, "Always Remember Us This Way" surpassed two billion streams on Spotify, becoming Gaga's fifth song to reach the milestone.

== Live performances and cover versions ==
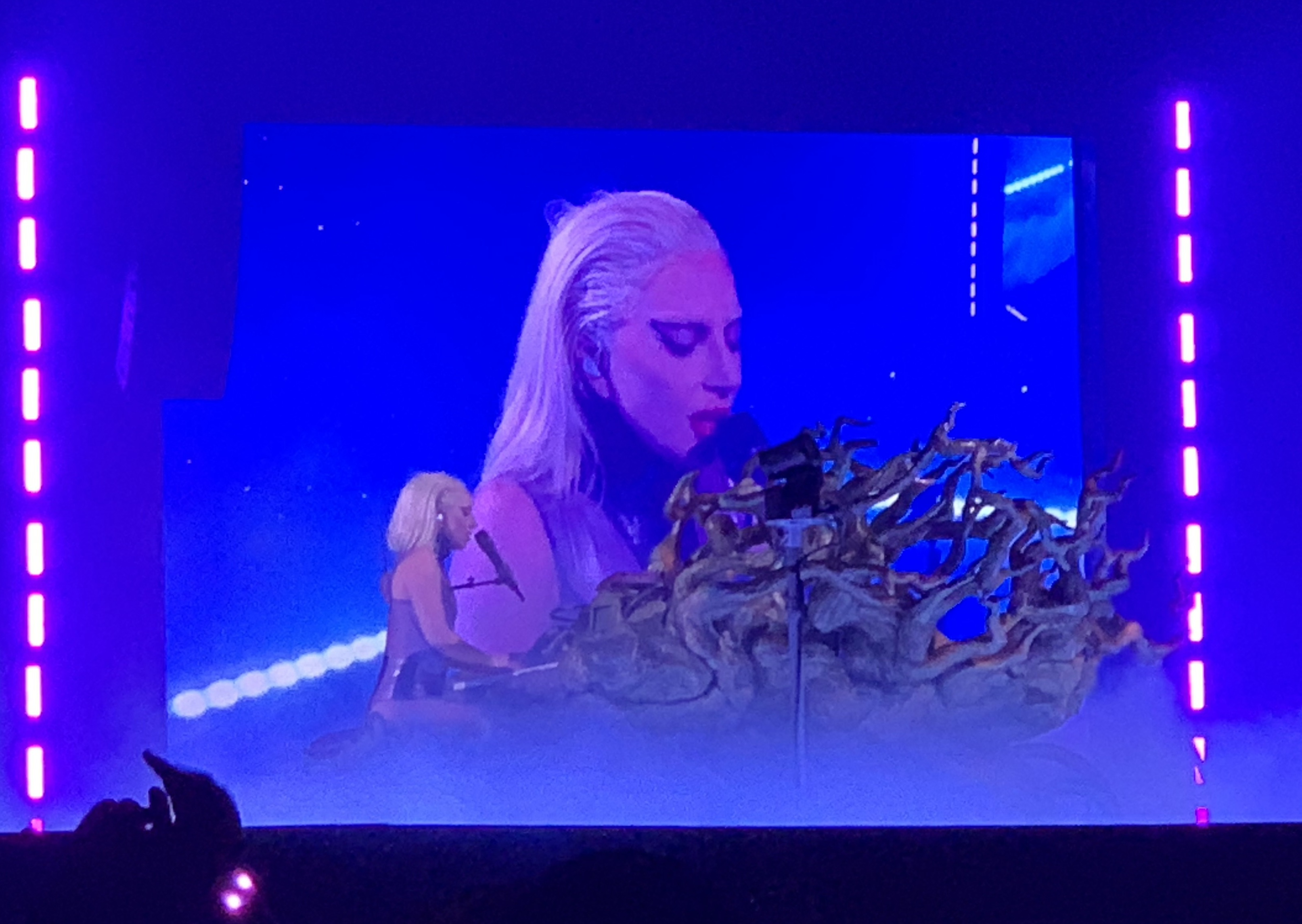
Gaga performing "Always Remember Us This Way" on The Chromatica Ball tour

In 2022, Gaga performed "Always Remember Us This Way" at The Chromatica Ball stadium tour while playing on the piano, which was set inside a sculpture of thorns. The performance was called "beautiful" and "gorgeous" by Lauren O'Neill from i and The Guardian's Michael Cragg, respectively. While reviewing the concert, Bob Gendron of the Chicago Tribune opined that the ballad performances of "Always Remember Us This Way" and "The Edge of Glory" revealed Gaga's gospel side. During the tour's stop at East Rutherford, New Jersey, Gaga dedicated "Always Remember Us This Way" to friend/frequent collaborator Tony Bennett, and also interjected a reminder to be "kind to those dealing with mental health" toward the end of the song. In Houston's Minute Maid Park, she dedicated the song to her Houston-born friend Sonja Durham, who died years earlier due to cancer.

Gaga performed "Always Remember Us This Way" on January 30, 2025, at Intuit Dome in Inglewood, California for FireAid to help with relief efforts for the January 2025 Southern California wildfires. She amended the song's opening line to, "That California sky burnin' in your eyes." During 2025 and 2026, Gaga included "Always Remember Us This Way" in her The Art of Personal Chaos concert series, performing it at two promotional shows in Singapore and select dates of the Mayhem Ball tour.

Welsh actor and singer Luke Evans released his own rendition of "Always Remember Us This Way" on his debut album At Last (2019). The same year, Canadian singer-songwriter Lauren Spencer Smith covered the song, which caught Steve Harvey's attention who invited her to his talk show. Smith later released her version as a standalone single. In November 2025, American singer Kelly Clarkson sang "Always Remember Us This Way" during the "Kellyoke" segment of The Kelly Clarkson Show.

== Credits and personnel ==
Credits adapted from the liner notes of A Star Is Born.

=== Management ===
- Published by Sony/ATV Songs LLC / Happygowrucke/Creative Pulse Music/These Are Pulse Songs (BMI). All rights administered by These Are Pulse Songs, BIRB Music (ASCAP).
- All Rights Administered by BMG Rights Management (US) LLC, Maps And Records Music/Creative Pulse Music (BMI).
- All rights administered by These Are Pulse Songs, Warner-Barham Music LLC (BMI) admin. by Songs of Universal (BMI) Warner-Olive Music LLC (ASCAP) admin. by Universal Music Corp. (ASCAP).
- Recorded at Coachella Valley Music and Arts Festival and EastWest Studios (Los Angeles, California)
- Mixed at Electric Lady Studios (New York City)
- Mastered at Sterling Sound Studios (New York City)

=== Personnel ===
- Lady Gaga – primary vocals, songwriter, producer, piano
- Natalie Hemby – songwriter
- Hillary Lindsey – songwriter
- Lori McKenna – songwriter
- Dave Cobb – producer
- Gena Johnson – recording
- Eddie Spear – recording
- Benjamin Rice – additional recording
- Tom Elmhirst – mixing
- Brandon Bost – mixing engineer
- Randy Merrill – audio mastering
- Chris Powell – drums
- Brian Allen – bass
- Maestro Lightford – keyboards
- LeRoy Powell – steel pedal guitar

== Charts ==
=== Weekly charts ===
2018–2019 weekly chart performance for "Always Remember Us This Way"
Chart (2018–2019)	Peak position
Australia (ARIA)	12
Austria (Ö3 Austria Top 40)	25
Belgium (Ultratop 50 Flanders)	10
Belgium (Ultratop 50 Wallonia)	5
Canada Hot 100 (Billboard)	26
Czech Republic Airplay (ČNS IFPI)	20
Czech Republic Singles Digital (ČNS IFPI)	17
Denmark (Tracklisten)	13
Estonia (IFPI)	19
Euro Digital Songs (Billboard)	5
Finland Airplay (Radiosoittolista)	7
France (SNEP)	18
Germany (GfK)	84
Greece Digital Songs (IFPI Greece)	21
Hungary (Rádiós Top 40)	25
Hungary (Single Top 40)	2
Hungary (Stream Top 40)	18
Iceland (Tónlistinn)	1
Ireland (IRMA)	3
Italy (FIMI)	41
Lithuania (AGATA)	11
Luxembourg Digital Songs (Billboard)	2
Malaysia (RIM)	16
Netherlands (Dutch Top 40)	16
Netherlands (Single Top 100)	30
New Zealand (Recorded Music NZ)	14
Norway (VG-lista)	7
Portugal (AFP)	10
Scottish Singles Sales (Official Charts)	4
Singapore (RIAS)	29
Slovakia Airplay (ČNS IFPI)	8
Slovakia Singles Digital (ČNS IFPI)	4
South Korea International Digital (Gaon)	52
Spain (Promusicae)	91
Sweden (Sverigetopplistan)	10
Switzerland (Schweizer Hitparade)	7
Switzerland (Media Control Romandy)	1
UK Singles (Official Charts)	25
US Billboard Hot 100	41

2025 weekly chart performance for "Always Remember Us This Way"
Chart (2025)	Peak position
Global Excl. US (Billboard)	176
Singapore (RIAS)	20

=== Year-end charts ===
2018 year-end chart performance for "Always Remember Us This Way"
Chart (2018)	Position
Hungary (Single Top 40)	36

2019 year-end chart performance for "Always Remember Us This Way"
Chart (2019)	Position
Australia (ARIA)	98
Belgium (Ultratop Flanders)	20
Belgium (Ultratop Wallonia)	13
Denmark (Tracklisten)	32
France (SNEP)	32
Hungary (Single Top 40)	12
Iceland (Tónlistinn)	4
Netherlands (Dutch Top 40)	56
Netherlands (Single Top 100)	76
New Zealand (Recorded Music NZ)	37
Norway (VG-lista)	12
Portugal (AFP)	60
Sweden (Sverigetopplistan)	25
Switzerland (Schweizer Hitparade)	12
US Digital Song Sales (Billboard)	32

== Certifications ==
Certifications and sales for "Always Remember Us This Way"
Region	Certification	Certified units/sales
Australia (ARIA)	9× Platinum	630,000^{‡}
Austria (IFPI Austria)	2× Platinum	60,000^{‡}
Belgium (BRMA)	Platinum	40,000^{‡}
Brazil (Pro-Música Brasil)	4× Diamond	640,000^{‡}
Denmark (IFPI Danmark)	3× Platinum	270,000^{‡}
France (SNEP)	Diamond	333,333^{‡}
Germany (BVMI)	Gold	200,000^{‡}
Italy (FIMI)	2× Platinum	200,000^{‡}
New Zealand (RMNZ)	7× Platinum	210,000^{‡}
Norway (IFPI Norway)	4× Platinum	240,000^{‡}
Poland (ZPAV)	Diamond	250,000^{‡}
Portugal (AFP)	2× Platinum	20,000^{‡}
Spain (Promusicae)	3× Platinum	180,000^{‡}
Switzerland (IFPI Switzerland)	Gold	10,000^{‡}
United Kingdom (BPI)	3× Platinum	1,800,000^{‡}
United States (RIAA)	Platinum	1,000,000^{‡}
Streaming
Sweden (GLF)	3× Platinum	24,000,000^{†}
^{‡} Sales+streaming figures based on certification alone.^{†} Streaming-only figures based on certification alone.

== Release history ==
Release dates and formats for "Always Remember Us This Way"
Region	Date	Format	Label	Ref.
Italy	January 4, 2019	Radio airplay	Universal	
France	January 18, 2019	Radio airplay	Universal	

== See also ==
- List of top 10 download singles in 2018 (France)
