= DKR =

DKR may refer to:

- IATA airport code for Léopold Sédar Senghor International Airport, which services Dakar, Senegal
- Unofficial shorthand for the Danish krone
- Batman: The Dark Knight Returns, a comic book
- The Dark Knight Rises, the third installment in Christopher Nolan's Batman movie series
- Darrell Royal (1924–2012), college football coach
  - Darrell K Royal–Texas Memorial Stadium, a stadium named partly after the college football coach
- Dynamic knowledge repository, a strategic concept
- Diddy Kong Racing, a 1997 video game for the Nintendo 64
  - Diddy Kong Racing DS, version for Nintendo DS
- DKR Engineering, a Luxembourgish racing team
- "DKR" (song), a 2016 song by Booba
- DKR fictional music group from On Cinema
- Lower Silesian Regional Railways, a now defunct Polish rail operator
