= I'll Never Love Again =

Song from the 2018 film A Star Is Born

Single by Lady Gaga and Bradley Cooper

from the album A Star Is Born
- Released: May 27, 2019
- Recorded: 2018
- Studio: EastWest, The Village West (Los Angeles)
- Venue: Shrine Auditorium
- Length: 4:41 (film version); 5:28 (extended version); 3:13 (radio edit)
- Label: Interscope
- Songwriters: Lady Gaga; Natalie Hemby; Hillary Lindsey; Aaron Raitiere
- Producers: Lady Gaga; Benjamin Rice

Lady Gaga singles chronology
"Always Remember Us This Way" (2019)	"I'll Never Love Again" (2019)	"Stupid Love" (2020)

Bradley Cooper singles chronology
"Shallow" (2018)	"I'll Never Love Again" (2019)

Music video
- "I'll Never Love Again" on YouTube

"I'll Never Love Again" is a song from the 2018 film A Star Is Born, performed by its stars Lady Gaga and director Bradley Cooper, whose character sings the final chorus in a flashback scene. The soundtrack includes both the film rendition and an extended solo recording by Gaga. A power ballad, it was written by Gaga, Natalie Hemby, Hillary Lindsey, and Aaron Raitiere, and produced by Gaga and Benjamin Rice. The song was developed during production of the film's ending, which Cooper continued revising while filming, and its climactic performance was shaped by Gaga's grief after the death of a close friend on the day the scene was shot.

"I'll Never Love Again" received widespread critical acclaim, with reviewers particularly praising Gaga's vocals and the emotional impact of the film's finale. Commercially, it topped the Slovak digital chart, reached the top ten of the record charts in Hungary, Ireland, and Scotland, and entered digital charts across Europe. The song was released to contemporary hit radio in France on May 27, 2019, as the soundtrack's third single. It became the album's second song to win the Grammy Award for Best Song Written for Visual Media, after lead single "Shallow", making A Star Is Born the only visual media soundtrack to date to win the award more than once at the Grammy Awards.

== Background and development ==
"I'll Never Love Again" is a song created for the 2018 film A Star Is Born–starring Bradley Cooper as Jackson and Lady Gaga as Ally–, as well as its soundtrack. It was written by Gaga, Natalie Hemby, Hillary Lindsey, and Aaron Raitiere, and produced by Gaga and Benjamin Rice. The soundtrack contains the film version of the song, which also features vocals from Bradley Cooper, as well as an extended version with only Gaga singing the song. Gaga later recalled that Cooper was still deciding how to end the film musically during production, as the script was being rewritten and the team had a "trove of songs" to choose from. According to her, even on the day of filming the final scene, Cooper was still changing which song would be used for the finale while she prepared at the piano in her trailer.

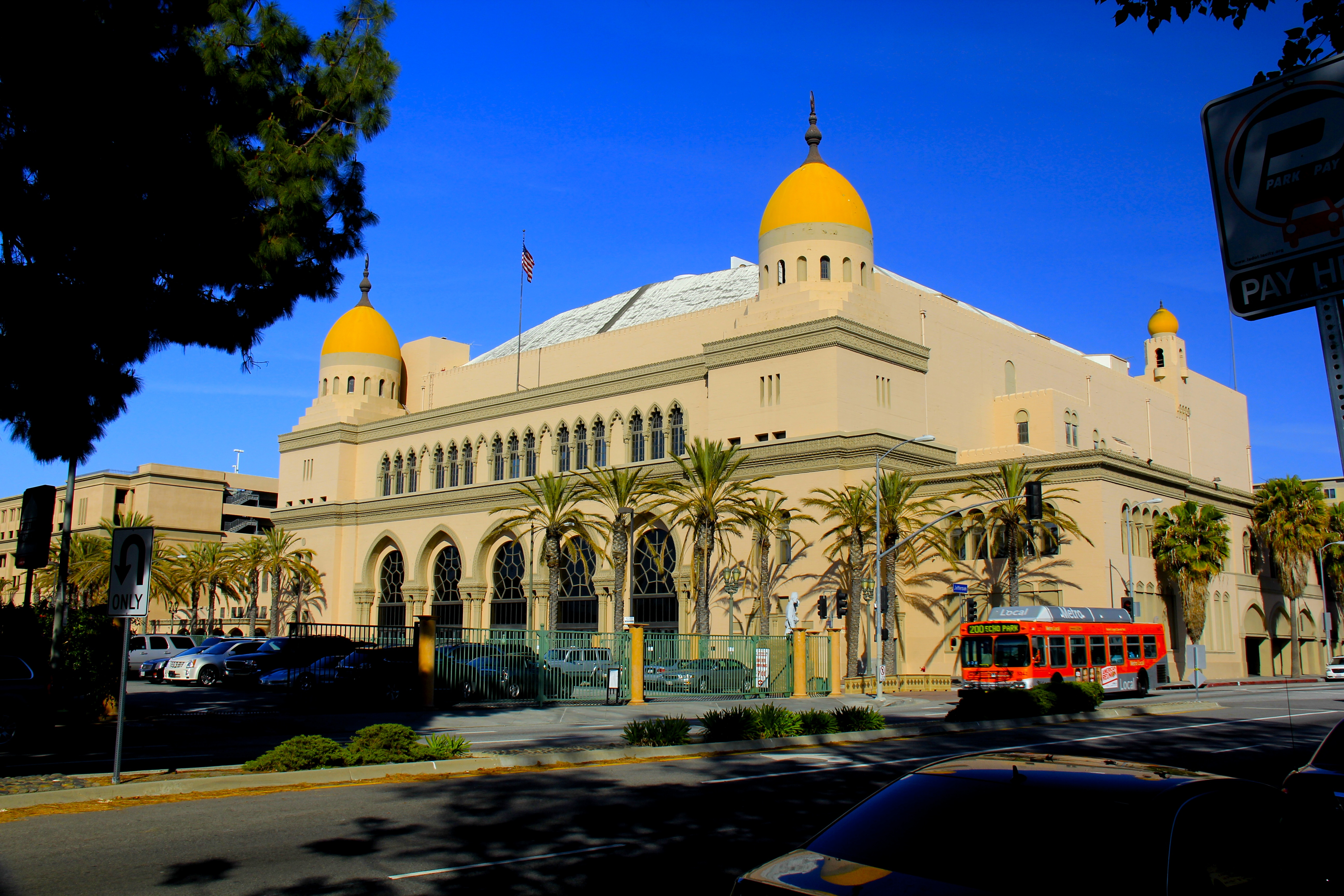
"I'll Never Love Again" was recorded at Los Angeles' Shrine Auditorium, the same location where Judy Garland taped the song "The Man That Got Away" for the 1954 version of A Star Is Born.

When Gaga was getting ready to film the final scene of A Star Is Born, where she sings "I'll Never Love Again", the singer got a telephone call that her childhood friend Sonja Durham was in her last moments of Stage IV cancer. Gaga left the set and drove to meet Durham, but she arrived ten minutes after her friend died. She asked Durham's husband if she should return to filming; he replied, "You've gotta do what Sonja would want you to do", so she returned to the set. Co-star and director Bradley Cooper was supportive of Gaga's loss but Gaga was adamant about finishing the scene, so she stepped on the set and sang "I'll Never Love Again". Gaga said, "[Sonja] gave me a tragic gift that day and I took it with me to [the] set, and I sang that song for Jackson and for her on that very same day within an hour."

The scene was filmed at the Shrine Auditorium and Gaga's grief shaped the emotional intensity of the performance. Unsure of what tempo, key, or delivery would feel right in the moment, Gaga asked engineer Alex Ruder to prepare seven versions of the master in four tempos and three keys, so playback could be adjusted as needed during filming. Benjamin Rice said the song had to be sung live on set, believing that a pre-recorded vocal would not have conveyed the same emotion, since the final take captures Gaga crying and sounding "very emotional and tender". He added that the Shrine Auditorium's connection to Judy Garland's performance of "The Man That Got Away" in the 1954 version of A Star Is Born gave the venue a "poetic resonance". Rice also recalled that when the crew arrived at the venue on the morning of filming, Cooper decided to rework the set-up for the scene with producer Karen Murphy, and that the changes were carried out within hours. He described the day as "distinctly emotional" and said Gaga brought a "raw heart" to the performance that is visible in the finished film. As with the other live performances in the film, the scene was staged for an audience of extras who could not hear the backing track and often could not hear Gaga's vocals either, as the production avoided playing the music over the venue's public-address system during takes.

== Use in film and composition ==
"I'll Never Love Again"
A 24-second sample of the song, highlighting Gaga's soft lower-register vocals over the piano-led arrangement during the first chorus.

A Star Is Born concludes with a tribute concert held in Jackson Maine's memory after his suicide. Introducing herself as "Ally Maine", Ally, wearing a periwinkle gown, performs "I'll Never Love Again", a song reflecting their relationship that they had worked on together while he was in recovery. The climactic performance is intercut with a flashback of Jackson singing the song to her for the first time at the piano, a device that Kristen S. Hé of Vulture viewed as deliberately tear-jerking but effective in underscoring their dynamic: Jackson recognizes Ally's artistic potential, while she is the one who fully brings it to life. The film ends with Ally gazing toward the audience. On October 19, 2018, a music video was released for the song–initially as an Apple Music exclusive–, showcasing these scenes and other clips from the film.

Musically, "I'll Never Love Again" has been described as a melancholic torch song and power ballad, inspired by the music of the 1970s. It starts as a piano ballad, before the arrangement gradually expands with strings, including violins, violas, cellos, and double basses. Gaga's singing style ranges from soft cooing in her lower register to belting. Bethonie Butler of The Washington Post wrote that Gaga transitions into "a honey-tinged, almost jazzlike section that feels as though she ad-libbed it in the studio" in "I'll Never Love Again", and described her performance as consisting of "passionate but controlled vocal runs". The song is performed in the key of G major with a moderate tempo of 54 beats per minute in common time. It follows a chord progression of G_{add2}–Em_{7}–C_{maj9}–D_{9sus} in the verses and G_{add2}–Em_{7(no3)}–C_{maj9}/E–D_{9sus} in the chorus. Gaga's vocals span from G_{3} to E_{5}. The lyrics talk about love and loss.

== Reception ==
=== Critical response ===
"I'll Never Love Again" received widespread critical acclaim. Music journalists described it as "stunning" and "show-stopping". Several outlets predicted that it could earn Gaga an Academy Awards nomination for Best Original Song. Writing for Vanity Fair, Yohana Desta said although "Shallow" was the Oscar front-runner, (Note: "Shallow" ultimately did end up being the nominated song, and later the winner of the category at the 91st Academy Awards.) "I'll Never Love Again" was "a more traditional choice" that served as "a perfect showcase" of Gaga's vocal range, and called it "the most heartrending song on the film's soundtrack". USA Today's Patrick Ryan felt that with "I'll Never Love Again", "the film's devastating emotional closer", Gaga delivers a "formidable number about love and loss with searing vulnerability and grace", calling it a "transcendent achievement" that could "single-handedly net the singer-turned-actress her first Oscar" and reaffirm her status as "one of the best vocalists right now in any genre".

Billboard's Tatiana Cirisano ranked Gaga's performance of "I'll Never Love Again" as the film's best scene, praising its "devastatingly beautiful" lyrics and Gaga's "full, skyscraper-high range". Jon Pareles of The New York Times compared the song to Harry Nilsson's "Without You" (1971) and Eric Carmen's "All by Myself" (1975), and complimented Gaga's "old-school finesse, timing, emotionality and lung power". In his film review for The Boston Globe, Ty Burr wrote that Gaga's "climactic memorial" performance of the song "will leave you a soggy mess". The Washington Post's Emily Yahr described it as "searing", while Bethonie Butler, from the same publication, named it the soundtrack's best song and praised Gaga's "passionate but controlled vocal runs". Comparing it to "Shallow", NME's Nick Reilly wrote that "things get similarly deep" with "I'll Never Love Again", "even if it comes dangerously close to dropping the accomplished emotional edge that came before." The Daily Telegraph's Neil McCormick considered "I'll Never Love Again" and "Always Remember Us This Way" Gaga's best solo tracks on the album, writing that although they are "clichéd, sentimental and old-fashioned", they are also "powered by enough conviction and vocal drama" to show that Gaga has "the star power to go supernova in any musical era".

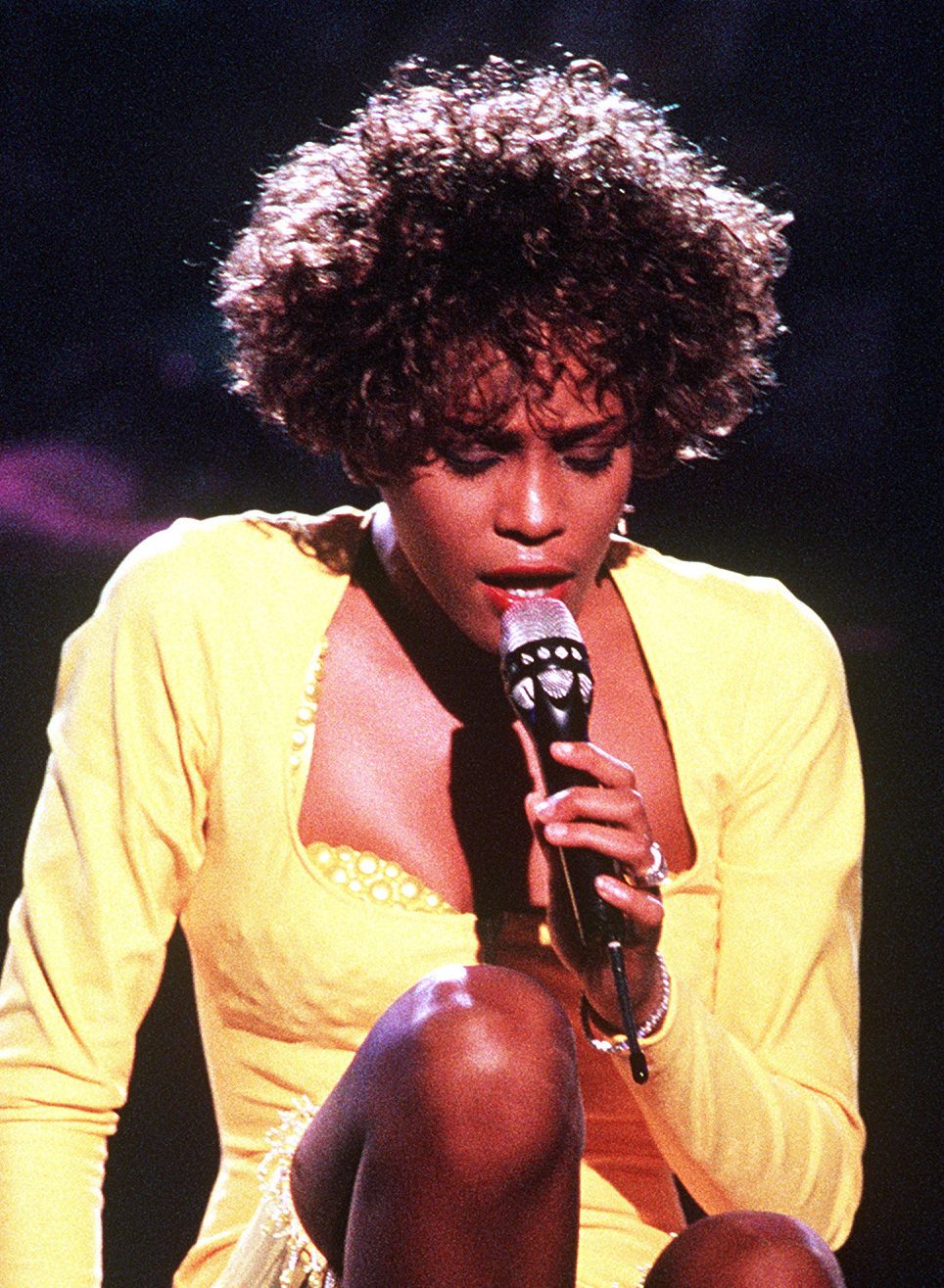
Several journalists compared the track and Gaga's vocal performance to Whitney Houston, particularly her rendition of "I Will Always Love You" (1992).alt=Whitney Houston singing into a handheld microphone, wearing a yellow dress with a matching cardigan and short, voluminous curly hair.

Several critics compared the song to performances by Whitney Houston. Ben Beaumont-Thomas of The Guardian called it a "hyper-emotional piano ballad", writing that Gaga "channels Whitney" in the verses but sounds "more affectingly girlish and vulnerable with the high-pitched chorus". Chris DeVille of Stereogum described it as a "fairly blatant attempt" to recapture the impact of Houston's version of "I Will Always Love You". The Plain Dealer's Joey Morona felt the "soundtrack wraps up on a high note" with "I'll Never Love Again", which he likened to "show-stopping movie finale" ballads such as "I Will Always Love You" and Celine Dion's "My Heart Will Go On" (1997). Natalie Walker of Vulture compared the song to a cross between Mariah Carey's "Without You" (1994) and Houston's "I Will Always Love You", and although she found the lyrics "too on the nose", she appreciated its "climactic finale anthem" quality. Adam White of The Independent wrote that Gaga evokes Whitney's "whoops and hums with uncanny aplomb" in "I'll Never Love Again", which as a result becomes "secretly the most cinematic number from A Star Is Born". For Entertainment Tonight, Alex Ungerman felt that "Always Remember Us This Way" would have been a more effective ending for the film, and called "I'll Never Love Again" "decent", but more like "a Whitney Houston b-side" than the movie's emotional peak.

Some reviewers particularly praised the film version of the track, which switches to Bradley Cooper's rendition near the end. Stereogum's DeVille felt the song becomes "more powerful" when it cuts from Gaga's orchestral performance to Cooper "meekly plucking it out at a piano". Brittany Spanos of Rolling Stone felt that "I'll Never Love Again" is "meant to be the biggest moment after a series of big moments" and already "feels as earned as the first time Ally sang an original song in front of an audience", but that the film version becomes truly affecting when it switches to Jackson singing it to Ally at home, at which point "it becomes as classic as the star it births". Pitchfork's Larry Fitzmaurice called it a "heart-wrenching closer" and wrote that although it is "plenty effective on its own", the dialogue-included version mirrors the film's ending by abruptly cutting away from Gaga's "time-stopping performance" to "a pivotal and heartbreaking scene" that "only enhances the song's emotional quotient".

=== Accolades ===
At the 62nd Annual Grammy Awards in 2020, "I'll Never Love Again" won the Grammy Award for Best Song Written for Visual Media, one year after the victory of lead single "Shallow" in the same category. This made A Star Is Born the first movie which gained two wins in this category. "I'll Never Love Again" was also handed out an award in the "Song That Left Us Shook" category at the 2019 iHeartRadio Music Awards.

== Chart performance ==
After the soundtrack's release, the song debuted at number 36 on the Billboard Hot 100 chart in the United States. It was later certified Platinum by the Recording Industry Association of America (RIAA). In the United Kingdom, it peaked at number 27 on the UK Singles Chart and was certified Platinum by the British Phonographic Industry (BPI) for more than 600,000 track-equivalent units. In Australia, the song debuted at number 32 and peaked at number 15 on the ARIA Singles Chart the following week, later receiving a triple Platinum certification from the Australian Recording Industry Association (ARIA) for 210,000 units sold. It also reached number 43 in Canada, number 14 in Switzerland, number 13 on New Zealand's Hot Singles chart, number 18 in Malaysia, and number 34 in Portugal.

In France, the song was released as the third single from the soundtrack on May 27, 2019, where it peaked at number 61 on the SNEP chart, and was later certified Diamond by the Syndicat National de l'Édition Phonographique (SNEP). Additionally, it reached the top ten in Hungary, Ireland and Scotland, the top five of digital charts in Greece, Luxembourg and Spain, and the chart summit in Slovakia. It also reached number five on Billboard's Euro Digital Songs chart.

On year-end charts, "I'll Never Love Again" placed at number 42 on Hungary's Single Top 40 chart in 2018, and, in 2019, appeared on the year-end charts in France, Hungary, Portugal, and on Billboard's US Digital Song Sales chart. The song also received additional certifications in several countries, including Gold in Austria, Denmark, and Norway, Platinum in Italy, New Zealand, and Portugal, 3× Platinum in Poland, and Diamond in Brazil.

== Cover versions ==
In October 2018, Filipino singer and Broadway actress Lea Salonga performed the song live during her 40th Anniversary Concert. In April 2019, Molly Hocking released a cover of the song after winning the eighth series of The Voice UK. This acted as her winner's single.

== Credits and personnel ==
Credits adapted from the liner notes of the A Star Is Born soundtrack album.

=== Management ===
- Published by Sony/ATV Songs LLC / SG Songs LLC (BMI) / Happygowrucke / Creative Pulse Music/These Are Pulse Songs (BMI).
- All rights administered by These Are Pulse Songs, BIRB Music (ASCAP) / BMG Rights Management (US) LLC
- Warner Tamerlane Publishing Corp. / Super LCS Publishing / One Tooth Productions (BMI), Warner-Barham Music LLC (BMI)
- Extra administration by Songs of Universal (BMI) / Warner-Olive Music LLC (ASCAP) admin. by Universal Music Corp. (ASCAP)
- Recorded at Shrine Auditorium, EastWest Studios, The Village West (Los Angeles, California)
- Mixed at Electric Lady Studios (New York City)
- Mastered at Sterling Sound Studios (New York City)

=== Personnel ===
- Lady Gaga – songwriter, producer, primary vocals
- Natalie Hemby – songwriter
- Hillary Lindsey – songwriter
- Aaron Raitiere – songwriter
- Benjamin Rice – producer, recording
- Bo Bodnar – recording assistant
- Alex Williams – recording assistant
- Tom Elmhirst – mixing
- Brandon Bost – mixing engineer
- Randy Merrill – audio mastering
- Chris Johnson (drummer) – drums
- Jon Drummond – bass
- Brokkett Parsons – keyboards
- Tim Stewart – guitar
- Ricky Tillo – guitar

=== Orchestra ===
- Stephen D. Oremus – string engineer
- Peter Rotter – strings contractor
- Alyssa Park – violin
- Julie Gigante – violin
- Charlie Bisharat – violin
- Jessica Guiderl – violin
- Bruce Dukov – violin
- Luanne Homzy – violin
- Benjamin Jacobson – violin
- Phillip Levy – violin
- Lisa Liu – violin
- Maya Magub – violin
- Lucia Micarelli – violin
- Josefina Vergara – violin
- Julie Gigante – violin
- Robert Brophy – violas
- Andrew Duckless – violas
- Matthew Funes – violas
- Darrin McCann – violas
- David Walther – violas
- Steve Eroody – cello
- Jacob Braun – cello
- Eric Byers – cello
- Dennis Karmazyn – cello
- Michael Valerio – contrabass
- Geoffrey Osika – contrabass

== Charts ==
=== Weekly charts ===
Weekly chart performance for "I'll Never Love Again"
Chart (2018)	Peak position
Australia (ARIA)	15
Austria (Ö3 Austria Top 40)	73
Canada Hot 100 (Billboard)	43
Czech Republic Singles Digital (ČNS IFPI)	52
Euro Digital Songs (Billboard)	5
France (SNEP)	61
Greece Digital Song Sales (Billboard)	3
Hungary (Single Top 40)	3
Ireland (IRMA)	10
Italy (FIMI)	61
Luxembourg Digital Songs (Billboard)	3
Malaysia (RIM)	18
New Zealand Hot Singles (RMNZ)	13
Portugal (AFP)	34
Scottish Singles Sales (Official Charts)	5
Slovakia Singles Digital (ČNS IFPI)	1
South Korea International Digital (Gaon)	47
Spain Physical/Digital (PROMUSICAE)	3
Sweden (Sverigetopplistan)	47
Switzerland (Schweizer Hitparade)	14
UK Singles (Official Charts)	27
US Billboard Hot 100	36

=== Year-end charts ===
2018 year-end chart performance for "I'll Never Love Again"
Chart (2018)	Position
Hungary (Single Top 40)	42

2019 year-end chart performance for "I'll Never Love Again"
Chart (2019)	Position
France (SNEP)	169
Hungary (Single Top 40)	28
Portugal (AFP)	167
US Digital Song Sales (Billboard)	70

== Certifications and sales ==
Certifications and sales for "I'll Never Love Again"
Region	Certification	Certified units/sales
Australia (ARIA)	3× Platinum	210,000^{‡}
Austria (IFPI Austria)	Gold	15,000^{‡}
Brazil (Pro-Música Brasil)	Diamond	160,000^{‡}
Brazil (Pro-Música Brasil) Extended version	Gold	20,000^{‡}
Denmark (IFPI Danmark)	Gold	45,000^{‡}
France (SNEP)	Diamond	333,333^{‡}
Italy (FIMI)	Platinum	100,000^{‡}
New Zealand (RMNZ)	Platinum	30,000^{‡}
New Zealand (RMNZ) Extended version	Gold	15,000^{‡}
Norway (IFPI Norway)	Gold	30,000^{‡}
Poland (ZPAV)	3× Platinum	150,000^{‡}
Portugal (AFP)	Platinum	10,000^{‡}
Spain (Promusicae) Extended version	Platinum	60,000^{‡}
United Kingdom (BPI)	Platinum	600,000^{‡}
United States (RIAA)	Platinum	226,000
Streaming
Sweden (GLF)	Gold	4,000,000^{†}
^{‡} Sales+streaming figures based on certification alone.^{†} Streaming-only figures based on certification alone.

== Release history ==
Release dates and formats for "I'll Never Love Again"
Region	Date	Format(s)	Version	Label	Ref.
France	May 27, 2019	Radio airplay	Radio edit	Universal	

== See also ==
- List of top 10 download singles in 2018 (France)
