= Goodbye (Feder song) =

Single by Feder featuring Lyse
- Released: 23 January 2015
- Recorded: 2014
- Length: 3:24
- Label: Time Records; Warner
- Songwriters: Anne-Lyse Blanc; Hadrien Federiconi
- Producer: Feder

Feder singles chronology
"Goodbye" (2015)	"Blind" (2015)

"Goodbye" is a song recorded by French DJ and producer Feder featuring the vocals of French singer Anne-Lyse Blanc. The song samples the intro riff from "The Bridge Is Broken" by The Dø. It first became a chart hit in Turkey, Russia, Ukraine and Romania before it started gaining chart success in France too. In spring 2015, the song was released in other European countries and became a top 10 hit in Belgium, Switzerland and Germany.

== Music video ==
A music video to accompany the release of "Goodbye" was first released onto YouTube on 27 February 2015 at a total length of three minutes and twenty-four seconds.

== Track listing ==
Digital download
No.	Title	Length
1.	"Goodbye [Radio Mix]" (featuring Lyse)	3:21

The Complete Collection (Digital download)
No.	Title	Length
1.	"Goodbye [Original Mix]" (featuring Lyse)	4:50
2.	"Goodbye [Kokiri Remix]" (featuring Lyse)	6:19
3.	"Goodbye [Syn Cole Remix]" (featuring Lyse)	4:54
4.	"Goodbye [Alex Schulz Remix]" (featuring Lyse)	4:04
5.	"Goodbye [Hugel Remix]" (featuring Lyse)	4:28
6.	"Goodbye [Vijay & Sofia Zlatko Remix]" (featuring Lyse)	5:50
7.	"Goodbye [Wolfskind Remix]" (featuring Lyse)	4:34
8.	"Goodbye [Stefan Dabruck Remix]" (featuring Lyse)	5:18
Total length:		40:17

== Chart performance ==
=== Weekly charts ===
Chart (2015)	Peak position
Austria (Ö3 Austria Top 40)	6
Belgium (Ultratop 50 Flanders)	3
Belgium Dance (Ultratop Flanders)	1
Belgium (Ultratop 50 Wallonia)	1
France (SNEP)	1
Germany (GfK)	8
Hungary (Dance Top 40)	2
Hungary (Rádiós Top 40)	9
Hungary (Single Top 40)	1
Hungary (Stream Top 40)	16
Israel International Airplay (Media Forest)	9
Italy (FIMI)	11
Lebanon (Lebanese Top 20)	8
Netherlands (Dutch Top 40)	24
Netherlands (Single Top 100)	26
Romania (Airplay 100)	11
Russia Airplay (TopHit)	3
Spain (Promusicae)	6
Switzerland (Schweizer Hitparade)	1
Ukraine Airplay (TopHit)	8
US Hot Dance/Electronic Songs (Billboard)	46
US Dance Club Songs (Billboard)	29

=== Year-end charts ===
2014 year-end chart performance for "Goodbye"
Chart (2014)	Position
Russia Airplay (TopHit)	172

Chart (2015)	Position
Austria (Ö3 Austria Top 40)	31
Belgium (Ultratop 50 Flanders)	15
Belgium Dance (Ultratop Flanders)	3
Belgium (Ultratop 50 Wallonia)	5
Belgium Dance (Ultratop Wallonia)	7
CIS (TopHit)	12
Germany (Official German Charts)	39
Hungary (Dance Top 40)	8
Hungary (Single Top 40)	4
Italy (FIMI)	61
Russia Airplay (TopHit)	14
Switzerland (Schweizer Hitparade)	15
Ukraine Airplay (TopHit)	12

Chart (2016)	Position
France (SNEP)	172
Hungary (Dance Top 40)	27
Russia Airplay (TopHit)	163

== Certifications ==
Region	Certification	Certified units/sales
Austria (IFPI Austria)	Gold	15,000^{‡}
Belgium (BRMA)	Platinum	30,000^{*}
France (SNEP)	Gold	75,000^{*}
Germany (BVMI)	Platinum	400,000^{‡}
Italy (FIMI)	Platinum	50,000^{‡}
Netherlands (NVPI)	Platinum	30,000^{‡}
Poland (ZPAV)	Gold	25,000^{‡}
Spain (Promusicae)	Gold	20,000^{‡}
Switzerland (IFPI Switzerland)	Platinum	30,000^{‡}
^{*} Sales figures based on certification alone.^{‡} Sales+streaming figures based on certification alone.

== Release history ==
Region	Date	Format	Label
France	2 January 2015	Digital download	Time Records; Warner
