= Alex Aiono =

American singer (born 1996)

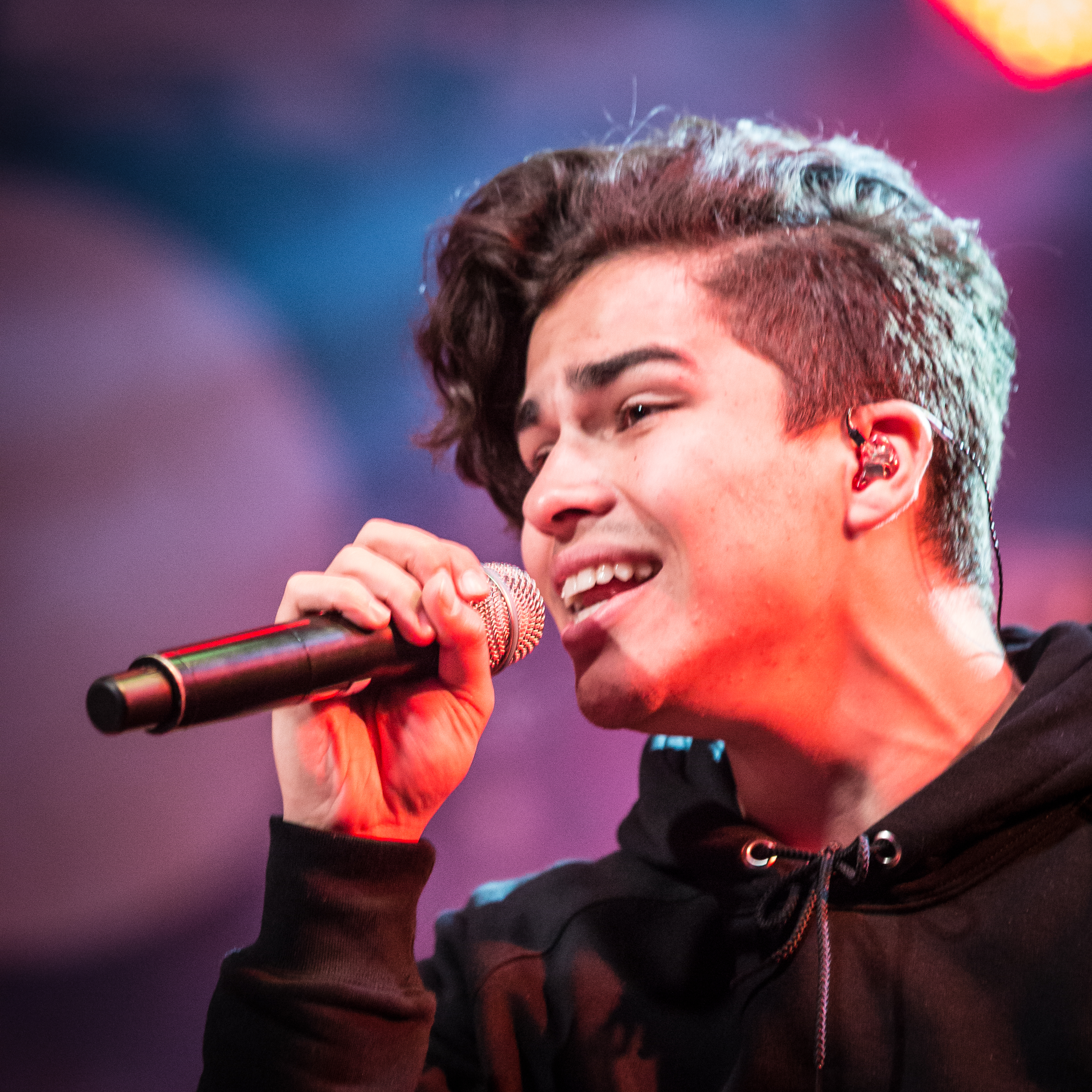
- Aiono at the SWR3 New Pop Festival 2017
- Born: Martin Alexander Aiono; February 16, 1996 (age 30); Utah, U.S.
- Occupations: Singer; actor
- Years active: 2011–present
- Musical career
- Genres: Pop; R&B
- Label: Become Records
- Website: alexaiono.com

YouTube information
- Channel: AlexAiono
- Years active: 2011–present
- Subscribers: 5.61 million
- Views: 1.049 billion
- Last updated: September 9, 2026

Martin Alexander Aiono (/aɪənoʊ/; born February 16, 1996) is an American singer, YouTuber, and actor from Phoenix, Arizona. Aside from his music, he is also known for starring in the 2021 Netflix film Finding 'Ohana.

== Biography ==
Aiono and his family, originally from Phoenix, Arizona, moved to Los Angeles when he was 14 so he could pursue a music career. They lived in a one-bedroom apartment while he was making his first music connections by performing on the Santa Monica promenade where he met one of his managers. His mother is European American and his father is of Samoan and Māori (Ngāti Porou) descent and grew up in Tolaga Bay, New Zealand, before moving to the United States. Aiono is a member of the Church of Jesus Christ of Latter-day Saints.

== Filmography ==
=== Film ===
Year	Title	Role
2021	Finding ʻOhana	Ioane
2023	See you on Venus	Kyle
2024	Beautiful Wedding	Miguel

=== Series ===
Year	Title	Role	Notes
2014–2016	Royal Crush	Sebastian	Main role, 23 episodes
2015	Guidance	Alex	Guest, 2 episodes
2021	I Think You Should Leave with Tim Robinson	Tour Guide	Guest, 1 episode
2021–2023	Doogie Kameāloha, M.D.	Walter Taumata	Recurring role, 14 episodes
2022–2024	Pretty Little Liars	Shawn Noble	Main role, 16 episodes
2024–2025	Rescue: HI-Surf	Kainalu Emerson	Main role

== Discography ==
=== Albums ===
Title	Album details
The Gospel at 23	Released: July 24, 2020; Formats: Digital download, streaming; Label: Become
Old Ways	Released: November 29, 2024; Formats: Digital download, streaming; Label: Independent

=== Extended plays ===
Title	EP details
Young & Foolish	Released: May 23, 2013; Formats: Digital download
Alexmas	Released: November 20, 2015; Formats: Digital download
Does It Feel Like Falling EP	Released: November 17, 2017; Formats: Digital download; Label: Interscope
Covered	Released: December 25, 2019; Formats: Digital download; Label: Become
Covered Volume 2	Released: December 29, 2020; Formats: Digital download

=== Singles ===
==== As main artist ====
Title	Year	Peak chart positions					Album
Title	Year	FRA	AUT	BEL (WA)	GER	SWI	Album
"Doesn't Get Better"	2013	—	—	—	—	—	Young & Foolish
"Young & Foolish"	2013	—	—	—	—	—	Young & Foolish
"Killer"	2015	—	—	—	—	—	Non-album single
"Ocean Love"	2015	—	—	—	—	—	Non-album single
"Wild"	2016	—	—	—	—	—	Non-album single
"Work the Middle"	2017	—	—	—	—	—	Non-album single
"Question"	2017	—	—	—	—	—	Non-album single
"Hot2Touch" (with Felix Jaehn and Hight)	2017	178	14	55	12	49	I
"Does It Feel Like Falling" (featuring Trinidad Cardona)	2017	—	—	—	—	—	Does It Feel Like Falling EP
"One at a Time" (with T-Pain)	2017	—	—	—	—	—	Non-album singles
"Thinking About You"	2018	—	—	—	—	—	Non-album singles
"Young Love"	2018	—	—	—	—	—	Non-album singles
"Big Mistake"	2018	—	—	—	—	—	Non-album singles
"No Drama"	2018	—	—	—	—	—	Non-album singles
"As You Need"	2018	—	—	—	—	—	Non-album singles
"Her"	2019	—	—	—	—	—	Non-album singles
"Better Me" (with Mashd N Kutcher)	2019	—	—	—	—	—	Non-album singles
"Unloving You"	2019	—	—	—	—	—	Non-album singles
"White Roses"	2019	—	—	—	—	—	Non-album singles
"I Can't Be Me"	2019	—	—	—	—	—	Non-album singles
"Sober Again"	2019	—	—	—	—	—	Non-album singles
"Another Life" (with Destiny Rogers)	2020	—	—	—	—	—	Non-album singles
"I Miss You" (with PLS&TY and Wifisfuneral)	2020	—	—	—	—	—	Very Special EP
"Filling Shoes"	2020	—	—	—	—	—	Non-album singles
"2 Kids"	2020	—	—	—	—	—	Non-album singles
"The Medicine" (with Dee Wilson)	2020	—	—	—	—	—	The Gospel at 23
"Good Morning"	2020	—	—	—	—	—	The Gospel at 23
"Played Out" (featuring Jake Miller)	2021	—	—	—	—	—	Non-album single
"Everything"	2023	—	—	—	—	—	Old Ways
"Right Here"	2023	—	—	—	—	—	Old Ways
"Best Of Me"	2024	—	—	—	—	—	Old Ways
"The More That I Think About It" (featuring Dana Williams)	2024	—	—	—	—	—	Old Ways
"Saving"	2025	—	—	—	—	—	TBA
"Worked Up"	2025	—	—	—	—	—	TBA

==== As featured artist ====
Title	Year	Peak chart positions		Album
Title	Year	FRA	BEL	Album
"Lordly" (Feder featuring Alex Aiono)	2016	36	10	Non-album single

==== Promotional singles ====
Title	Year	Peak chart positions	Album
Title	Year	FRA	Album
"Jealous"	2015	—	Non-album single
"One Dance"/"Hasta el Amanecer" (Mashup)	2016	69	Non-album single
"Despacito"/"I'm the One" (Mashup)	2017	—	Non-album single

== Tours ==
Headlining

- The After Party Tour (2017)
- Feels Like Tour (2018)
- Fun23 Tour (2019)

Co-headlining

- The Changes Tour (with William Singe) (2017)

Opening act

- R5 - Loud Tour (2013)
- Bridgit Mendler – Summer Tour (2014)
- The Dolan Twins - 4 Only U-Tour (2016)
- Sabrina Carpenter - The De-Tour (2017)
