= Emmi (Australian singer) =

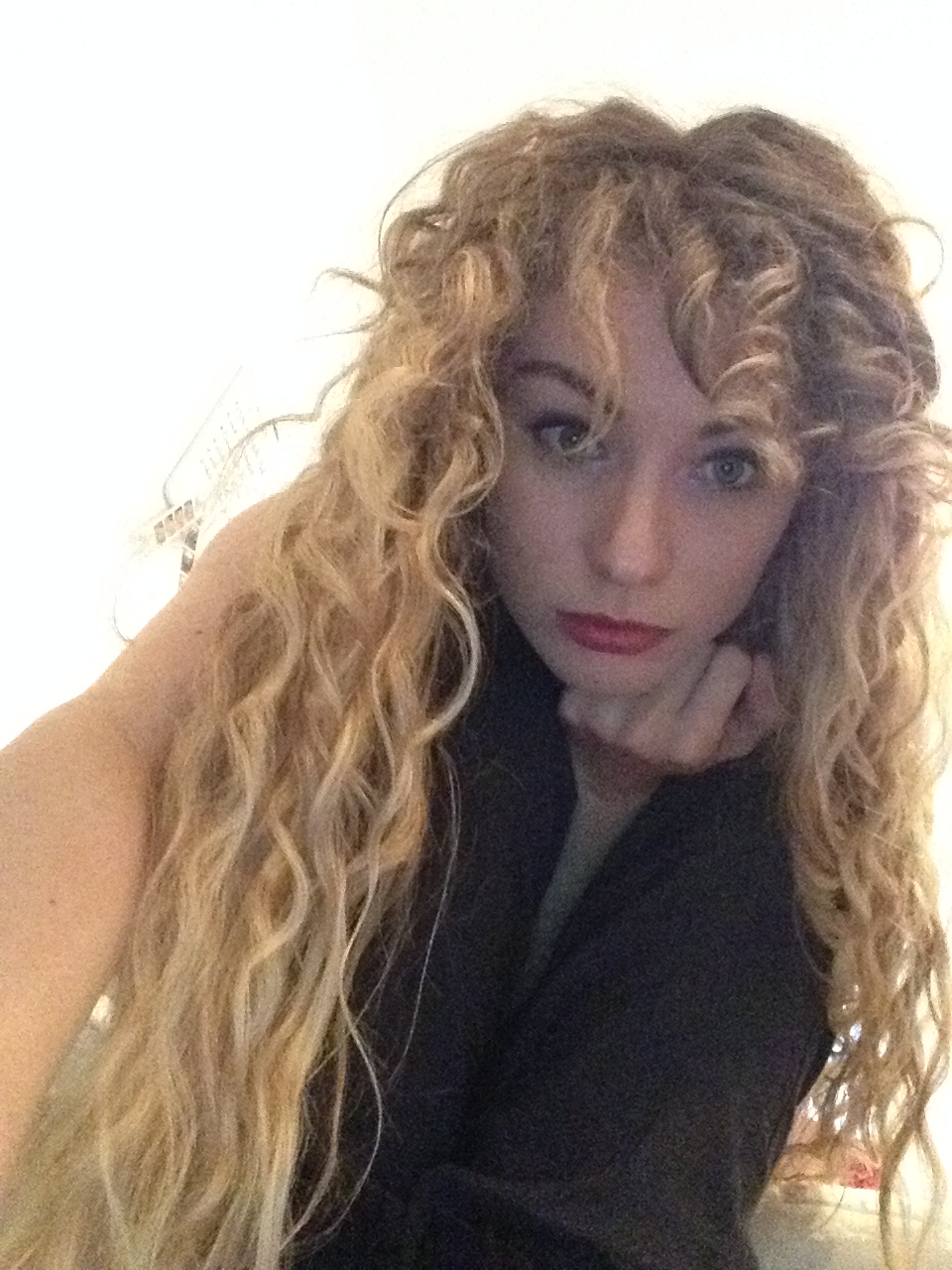
- Emmi at a recording studio in 2015

Background information
- Also known as: Emmi
- Born: Emily Joy Green; Torquay, Devon, England
- Genres: Pop; R&B; Soul; Acoustic
- Occupations: Singer; songwriter
- Instruments: Vocals; piano
- Years active: 2015–present
- Website: emmi.world

Emily Joy Green, known by her stage name Emmi, is a British-Australian singer and songwriter.

== Early life ==
Emily Green was born in Torquay, Devon, England, the middle child of an older brother and a younger sister. She grew up in Papua New Guinea for her father's job as a pilot. Moving to Perth, Australia, Emmi got used to feeling like the outsider and began to focus on her love of dancing, and later left to dance full-time in Sydney.

== Career ==
Green began her musical career after being signed to a music publisher in Australia, writing songs for Neil Davidge of Massive Attack and Little Nikki.

Green's debut single "My Kinda Swag" premiered on The Guardian in May 2015, who described it as "delicate torch song... [with a] metronomic electronic pulse." as well as a "cracking debut" and the "highlight of 2015 so far". Tobi Oke of Complex also described 'My Kinda Swag' as a "stunning debut single". In July 2015, Emmi's second single "Sleep on It" was premiered by The 405.

American singer Taylor Swift included Emmi's single "Sleep on It" in her handwritten playlist 'New Songs That Will Make Your Life More Awesome', alongside Alessia Cara, Hailee Steinfeld and MIA. BuzzFeed's Kyle Davis later named "Sleep on It" as one of "The 30 Most Criminally Underrated Pop Songs of 2015".

In October 2015, Emmi released third single "60 Minutes", on Billboard.

"My Kinda Swag" was selected by BBC Radio 1 as their BBC Introducing Track of The Week for 25 January 2016.

Emmi's voice also features on two 2015 dance singles – "Our Youth" by Sonny Alven and "Blind" by Feder.

"Blind" remained in the official French charts for 26 weeks, peaking at number 5. "Our Youth" featured in the Norwegian charts for seven weeks, peaking at number 11 and featured in a Pepsi Max commercial, 'Dancing in the Rain'. "Our Youth" has been nominated for a Spellemannprisen (often referred to as the Norwegian Grammy Awards).

In May 2016, Emmi performed at festivals including The Great Escape Festival and BBC Radio 1's Big Weekend, before premiering her fourth single "You Said You Loved Me" through Clash Magazine.

In October 2016, it was revealed on Pottermore that Emmi would feature on the official soundtrack for Fantastic Beasts and Where to Find Them, singing "Blind Pig", written by the screenwriter and Harry Potter author J. K. Rowling. Emmi was chosen by the director David Yates himself, who described Emmi as a "wonderful wonderful artist". The BBC picked up on the story on 15 November 2016 with the headline "Unsigned singer Emmi wins big break in Fantastic Beasts film" where it was revealed that Emmi did not realise it was David Yates that had made contact, and initially replied with, "I'm on holiday with my parents and we're about to eat pizza, can we put this off?" "Blind Pig" was shortlisted for the Best Original Song 2017 Academy Award

In November 2016, Emmi had a featured Brand New Artist Spotlight on MTV and went on to win MTV Brand New For 2016 in Australia and New Zealand, notching up 60,000 votes to clinch the prize and raising $10,000 for the Perth charity Telethon in the process.

Her single "Couldn't Care Less" was premiered on 11 November 2016 by Live Nation's 'OnestoWatch' and her single "Talk to Me" was released on 8 March 2017 and premiered as Clash Magazine's Track of the Day being described as a "bold, brash piece of electronic pop with just a hint of sugar on top".

== Artistry ==
Green cites classical music, jazz and Shirley Temple movies as her influences.

== Discography ==
=== Extended plays ===
List of extended plays
Title	Details
Lovers	Released: 3 December 2018; Label: Independent; Formats: digital download, streaming

=== Singles ===
==== As lead artist ====
List of singles as lead artist, showing year released and album name
Title	Year	Album
"My Kinda Swag"	2015	Non-album singles
"Sleep on It"	2015	Non-album singles
"60 Minutes"	2015	Non-album singles
"Up N Away"	2016	Non-album singles
"You Said You Loved Me"	2016	Non-album singles
"Couldn't Care Less"	2016	Non-album singles
"Blind Pig"	2016	Fantastic Beasts and Where to Find Them
"Talk To Me"	2017	Non-album singles
"First Plane Home"	2020	Non-album singles
"Drum"	2021	Non-album singles
"Crown"	2021	Non-album singles
"Night Light"	2021	Non-album singles
"End of the World"	2021	Non-album singles
"The Prologue"	2021	Non-album singles
"Pretty Boy"	2021	Non-album singles
"Just Die Once"	2022	Non-album singles

==== As featured artist ====
List of singles as featured artist, with selected chart positions, showing year released and album name
Title	Year	Peak chart positions												Album
Title	Year	AUT	BEL (FL)	BEL (WA)	CIS	FRA	GER	HUN Dance	NOR	POL Dance	RUS	SWI	UKR	Album
"Blind" (Feder featuring Emmi)	2015	39	40	50	21	5	78	14	—	41	23	25	22	Non-album singles
"Our Youth" (Sonny Alven featuring Emmi)	2015	—	—	—	—	—	—	—	11	—	—	—	—	Non-album singles
"—" denotes a single that did not chart or was not released in that territory.

== Filmography ==
=== Film ===
Year	Title	Role	Director	Notes
2016	Fantastic Beasts and Where to Find Them	Singer	David Yates	Goblin Singer – The Blind Pig

Awards and achievements
Preceded by At Sunset	Winner of MTV Brand New, Australia; 2016	Succeeded by tba
