= Blind (Feder song) =

Single by Feder featuring Emmi
- Released: 20 November 2015
- Recorded: 2015
- Genre: Dance
- Length: 3:14
- Label: Time Records; Warner
- Songwriters: Hadrien Federiconi; Emily Green; Joachim Masson
- Producer: Hadrien Federiconi

Feder singles chronology
"Goodbye" (2015)	"Blind" (2015)	"Lordly" (2016)

"Blind" is a song recorded by French DJ and producer Feder featuring the vocals of Emmi. The song was released as a digital download in France on 20 November 2015 through Time Records and Warner Music.

== Music video ==
A music video to accompany the release of "Blind" was first released onto YouTube on 10 December 2015 at a total length of three minutes and twenty-four seconds.

== Track listing ==
Digital download
No.	Title	Length
1.	"Blind" (feat. Emmi)	3:14

== Chart performance ==
=== Weekly charts ===
Chart (2016)	Peak position
Austria (Ö3 Austria Top 40)	39
Belgium (Ultratip Bubbling Under Flanders)	40
Belgium (Ultratop 50 Wallonia)	50
CIS (Tophit)	21
France (SNEP)	5
Germany (GfK)	78
Hungary (Dance Top 40)	14
Poland Dance (ZPAV)	41
Russia Airplay (TopHit) Red Max Remix	45
Switzerland (Schweizer Hitparade)	25
Ukraine Airplay (TopHit)	43

=== Year-end charts ===
Chart (2016)	Position
Switzerland (Schweizer Hitparade)	94

== Release history ==
Region	Date	Format	Label
France	20 November 2015	Digital download	Time Records; Warner
