= En feu =

Single by Soprano

from the album L'Everest
- Released: 30 July 2016
- Genre: Pop rap
- Length: 3:25
- Songwriters: Saïd M'Roubaba; Djaresma
- Producer: Mej

Music video
- En feu on YouTube

"En feu" (pronounced [ɑ̃ fø]; lit. 'On fire') is a song by French rapper Soprano released in 2016 on the album L'Everest.

== Chart performance ==
=== Weekly charts ===
Chart (2016)	Peak position
Belgium (Ultratop 50 Wallonia)	29
France (SNEP)	4
