= Demain (song) =

Single by Bigflo & Oli and Petit Biscuit

from the album La vie de rêve
- Released: 6 July 2018
- Genre: Chillwave; hip hop
- Length: 4:11
- Label: Polydor
- Songwriters: Florian Ordoñez; Olivio Ordoñez; Mehdi Benjelloun
- Producer: Petit Biscuit

Bigflo & Oli singles chronology
"Papa" (2017)	"Demain" (2018)	"Plus tard" (2018)

Petit Biscuit singles chronology
"Problems" (2018)	"Demain" (2018)	"Wake Up" (2018)

"Demain" is a song by French artists Bigflo & Oli featuring French DJ Petit Biscuit. It was released on July 6, 2018. It was later featured on Bigflo & Oli album "La vie de rêve".

The song has peaked at number 5 on the French Singles Chart.

== Charts ==
=== Weekly charts ===
Chart (2018)	Peak position
France (SNEP)	5
Switzerland (Schweizer Hitparade)	91

== Certifications ==
Region	Certification	Certified units/sales
France (SNEP)	Diamond	333,333^{‡}
^{‡} Sales+streaming figures based on certification alone.
