= Julian Perretta =

Musical artist (born 1989)

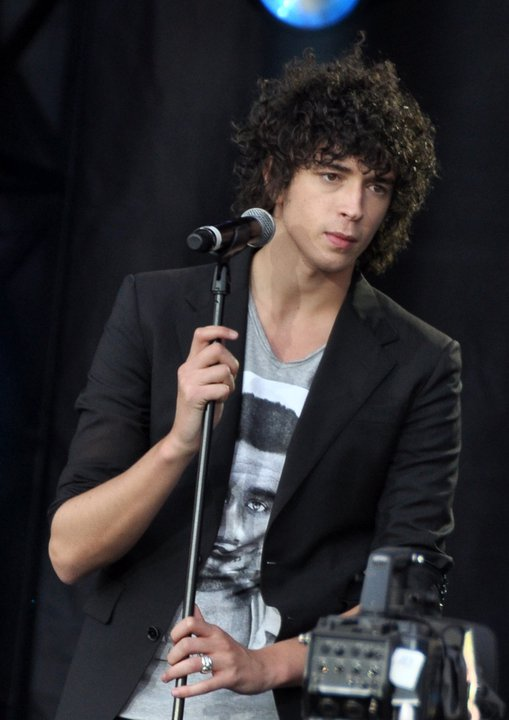
- Perretta performing in 2011

Background information
- Born: 13 January 1989 (age 37); Calabria, Italy
- Genres: Pop; soul; dance
- Years active: 2008–present
- Labels: RCA; Sony

Julian Remo Perretta (born 13 January 1989) is an Italian-born, London-raised singer-songwriter and producer. Perretta first gained attention in 2010 with the single "Wonder Why", released in the UK by Columbia Records.

Perretta has worked with artists across many genres, notably Ed Sheeran, Ellie Goulding, Dua Lipa, Mark Ronson, and Atlanta-based hip-hop artist Lil Baby.

In 2022, Perretta's vocals were featured on the global hit single “Miss You”, by German producer Southstar.

In 2023, Perretta collaborated with Purple Disco Machine and Kungs on the single "Substitution".

== Personal life ==
Perretta was born in London to an Italian father and an Irish mother, having one sister. Perretta left school at 15 to pursue a music career. He developed a fan base while playing regular live sets at The Water Rats in Kings Cross and other pubs and bars around central London.

== Music career ==
In May 2008, he joined Mark Ronson and Amy Winehouse on a European tour, and sang the Smiths' song, "Stop Me". In November 2009, Beyoncé invited Perretta to be a special guest on her "I Am" Arena Tour. In July 2017, Beyoncé invited Perretta on the Formation Tour as her special guest.

Shortly after leaving school, he met the members of the band Jamiroquai and began working on demos. Two members from Jamiroquai—keyboardist Matt Johnson and guitarist Rob Harris—went on to produce Perretta's debut LP, and Universal Music Group signed him in 2010. Although a British artist, Perretta found greater success in continental Europe, notably France, Belgium, Switzerland, the Netherlands, and Germany. In January 2010, the debut single "Wonder Why" received its first play on national radio. BBC Radio 1 presented the single by host Annie Mac to a positive response from the public. In October 2010, Perretta performed on French television shows Le Grand Journal and Taratata.

"Wonder Why" received large radio airplay and charted within the top 5 on multiple iTunes charts around Europe, reaching platinum status. His debut album, Stitch Me Up, was released on 27 March 2011 and received positive reviews from critics. The album was certified platinum a year later, charting at number 1 in France and performing reasonably well in Germany, Denmark, Sweden and Holland.

In March 2011, Perretta toured Europe, playing a total of 104 shows.

In October 2011, Universal released a deluxe edition of the album Stitch Me Up as a Christmas re-edition. It contained 7 new tracks, including acoustic versions and behind-the-scenes videos of the singer on tour. A promotional video for Perretta's single "Ride My Star" was released online on 19 October 2011. Perretta has also appeared on Ed Sheeran tours on various occasions throughout Europe in late 2012, playing some original material and covers.

Perretta also collaborated with Los Angeles–based producer Zhu, most known for the single "Faded", which found fame.

Perretta released a single from his second album, Karma, on 13 November 2015, entitled "Miracle", a collaboration with Belgian producer Lost Frequencies. The song became Perretta's biggest solo hit to date, selling over 1.2 million copies and reaching number 1 in over 14 countries.

== Discography ==
=== Studio albums ===
List of albums, with selected chart positions
Title	Album details	Peak chart positions	
Title	Album details	BE (WA)	FRA
Stitch Me Up	Released: 27 September 2010; Label: Polydor; Formats: CD, digital download	6	30
Karma	Released: 17 June 2016; Label: Play On; Formats: CD, digital download	—	29

=== Singles ===
List of singles, with selected chart positions, showing year released and album name
Single	Year	Peak chart positions					Album
Single	Year	BEL (FL)	BEL (WA)	FRA	NLD	SWI	Album
"Wonder Why"	2010	32 (Ultratip)	11	8	68	64	Stitch Me Up
"Stitch Me Up"	2010	—	10 (Ultratip)	81	—	—	Stitch Me Up
"If I Ever Feel Better"	2011	—	8 (Ultratip)	82	—	—	Stitch Me Up
"Generation X"	2012	—	12 (Ultratip)	159	—	—	Non-album singles
"Naked"	2012	—	35 (Ultratip)	—	—	—	Non-album singles
"That's All"	2013	—	—	—	—	—	Non-album singles
"Wildfire"	2014	—	9 (Ultratip)	82	—	—	Non-album singles
"Miracle"	2015	21	5	5	—	13	Karma
"I Cry"	2016	—	3 (Ultratip)	19	—	—	Karma
"Karma"	2016	—	32 (Ultratip)	74	—	—	Karma
"Private Dancer" (with Feder)	2017	—	—	41	—	—	Non-album singles
"On the Line"	2018	—	20	20	—	—	Non-album singles
"Perfect Melody" (with Jonas Blue)	2022	—	—	—	—	—	Together
"—" denotes releases that did not chart.

Featured in

List of singles, with selected chart positions, showing year released and album name
Single	Year	Peak chart positions				Album
Single	Year	AUT	BEL (FL)	BEL (WA)	FRA	Album
"Body Talk (Mammoth)" (Dimitri Vegas & Like Mike, (Moguai) feat. Julian Perretta)	2014	—	2	25	106	Non-album singles
"Tales of Tomorrow" (Dimitri Vegas & Like Mike vs. Fedde Le Grand feat. Julian Perretta)	2015	64	2	21	—	Non-album singles
"—" denotes releases that did not chart.

=== Videography ===
Year	Single	Director
2010	"Wonder Why"	David Yarvoroski
2010	"Stitch Me Up"	JCT
2011	"If I Ever Feel Better"	David Yarvoroski
2012	"RIde My Star"	Blac Ionica
2013	"That's All"	
2014	"All I Need"	
2015	"Tales of Tomorrow"	
