= Miracle (Julian Perretta song) =

Single by Julian Perretta

from the album Karma
- Released: 27 November 2015
- Genre: Tropical house
- Length: 2:42
- Songwriters: Julian Perretta; Clément Boucaux

"Miracle" is a song by Julian Perretta released in 2015 in a collaboration with Belgian producer Lost Frequencies. The song became Perretta's biggest solo hit to date.

== Charts ==
=== Weekly charts ===
Chart (2016)	Peak position
Austria (Ö3 Austria Top 40)	12
Belgium (Ultratop 50 Flanders)	21
Belgium (Ultratop 50 Wallonia)	5
France (SNEP)	5
Germany (GfK)	19
Ireland (IRMA)	45
Poland (Video Chart)	3
Slovakia Airplay (ČNS IFPI)	5
Slovenia (SloTop50)	12
Switzerland (Schweizer Hitparade)	13

=== Year-end charts ===
Chart (2016)	Position
Austria (Ö3 Austria Top 40)	66
Belgium (Ultratop Wallonia)	13
Germany (Official German Charts)	66
Switzerland (Schweizer Hitparade)	55

== Certifications ==
Region	Certification	Certified units/sales
Belgium (BRMA)	Gold	10,000^{‡}
Germany (BVMI)	Gold	200,000^{‡}
Switzerland (IFPI Switzerland)	Platinum	30,000^{‡}
^{‡} Sales+streaming figures based on certification alone.
