= Breathe (Feder song) =

Single by Feder

from the album Breathe
- Released: 24 November 2017
- Genre: Dance-pop
- Length: 3:03
- Songwriter(s): Hadrien Federiconi; Quentin Segaud

"Breathe" is a song by French artist Feder. The song has peaked at number 10 on the French Singles Chart.

== Charts ==
Chart (2018)	Peak position
France (SNEP)	10
