= Lordly =

Single by Feder featuring Alex Aiono
- Released: 20 August 2016
- Recorded: 2015
- Genre: Dance
- Length: 3:14
- Label: Atlantic Records UK
- Songwriters: Hadrien Federiconi; Tienus Konijnenburg

Feder singles chronology
"Blind" (2016)	"Lordly" (2016)

"Lordly" is a song recorded by French DJ and producer Feder featuring the vocals of Alex Aiono. The song was released as a digital download on 20 August 2016 through Atlantic Records UK. The song was written by Hadrien Federiconi and Tienus Konijnenburg. The song has peaked to number 10 on the French Singles Chart and also achieved success in Poland and CIS countries (mostly in Russia, when topped the Tophit chart). The song featured as the theme song of the 2017 World Men's Handball Championship.

== Music video ==
A music video to accompany the release of "Lordly" was first released onto YouTube on 5 September 2016 at a total length of three minutes and fourteen seconds.

== Track listing ==
Digital download
No.	Title	Length
1.	"Lordly" (feat. Alex Aiono)	3:16

== Chart performance ==
=== Weekly charts ===
Chart (2016–2018)	Peak position
Belarus Airplay (Eurofest)	54
Belgium (Ultratop 50 Wallonia)	36
France (SNEP)	10
Germany (Airplay Chart)	95
Poland Airplay (ZPAV)	14
Poland Dance (ZPAV)	18
Russia Airplay (Tophit)	1
Ukraine Airplay (Tophit)	27

=== Year-end charts ===
Chart (2017)	Position
Latvia Airplay (LaIPA)	93
Poland (ZPAV)	64

== Certifications ==
Region	Certification	Certified units/sales
France (SNEP)	Diamond	233,333^{‡}
Poland (ZPAV)	2× Platinum	100,000^{‡}
^{‡} Sales+streaming figures based on certification alone.

== Release history ==
Region	Date	Format	Label
France	20 August 2016	Digital download	Warner Music
