= Catchu Catchu =

Single by Lartiste

from the album Grandestino
- Released: 27 October 2017
- Length: 3:33
- Songwriters: Jo Rafa; Lartiste

"Catchu Catchu" is a song by French hip-hop singer Lartiste taken from his album Grandestino. The song has peaked at number 7 on the French Singles Chart.

== Charts ==
Chart (2018)	Peak position
Belgium (Ultratop 50 Wallonia)	26
France (SNEP)	7
