= Dommage =

Single by Bigflo & Oli

from the album La vraie vie
- Released: 8 September 2017
- Genre: French rap
- Length: 3:58
- Label: Polydor
- Songwriters: Florian Ordonez; Olivio Ordonez; Stromae
- Producers: Bigflo & Oli; Stromae

Music video
- "Dommage" on YouTube

"Dommage" is a song by French hip-hop duo Bigflo & Oli taken from their album La vraie vie. The song peaked at number 11 on the French Singles Chart. The single was certified platinum single in France, with the equivalent of more than 20 million streams. It was later certified diamond with equivalent of 25 million streams.

== Context ==
The song evokes four characters, each with a verse telling their story. The first verse, sung by Bigflo, speaks of Louis, a timid young man who does not dare to confess his love to a woman he meets every day on the bus, and ends up never seeing her again. The second verse, sung by Oli, tells the story of Yasmine, a woman who dreams of becoming a singer despite strong objections from her father, and finishes as a worker in a factory. The third verse, sung by Bigflo, talks about Diego, who prefers to stay at home, instead of going out in the evening and finding the love of his life. The fourth verse, sung by Oli, evokes Pauline, a married woman beaten by her husband, who does not dare to break the marriage and ends up dead.

The song brings together these four characters by a phrase - the moral of the song - saying "Vaut mieux vivre avec des remords qu'avec des regrets" (meaning Better live with remorse than with regret) repeating it four times at the end of the song targeted to the four characters.

== Music video ==
The release of the music video struck a chord with viewers soon becoming a trending video. More than one million checked it in the first day of release. In the video clip, Louis is played by Panayotis Pascot, Diego by Samy Seghir, while Pauline is played by Pascale Arbillot. The clip, released on September 8, 2017, is directed by Benoît Pétré.

At the end of February 2018, the video exceeded 100 million views. At the beginning of June 2018, the video ranked among the top 35 French-language music videos that have been the most watched on YouTube.

== Awards ==
The song "Dommage" won the Best Original Song of the Year in 2018 during the Victoires de la chanson in France.

== In popular culture ==
In a special feature La chanson secrète broadcast on 29 December 2018 hosted by Nikos Aliagas on TF1, the French singer Louane interpreted an acoustic version with the sisters Camille and Julie Bertholet and a 4-piece violin quartet. On screen three celebrities and actual friends of Bigflo & Oli made cameo appearances. The show had been recorded at La Seine Musicale in Sèvres.

== Charts ==
=== Weekly charts ===
Chart (2017)	Peak position
Belgium (Ultratop 50 Wallonia)	46
France (SNEP)	11
Switzerland (Schweizer Hitparade)	88

=== Year-end charts ===
Chart (2017)	Position
France (SNEP)	96
Chart (2018)	Position
France (SNEP)	78
