= Bigflo & Oli =

French hip hop duo

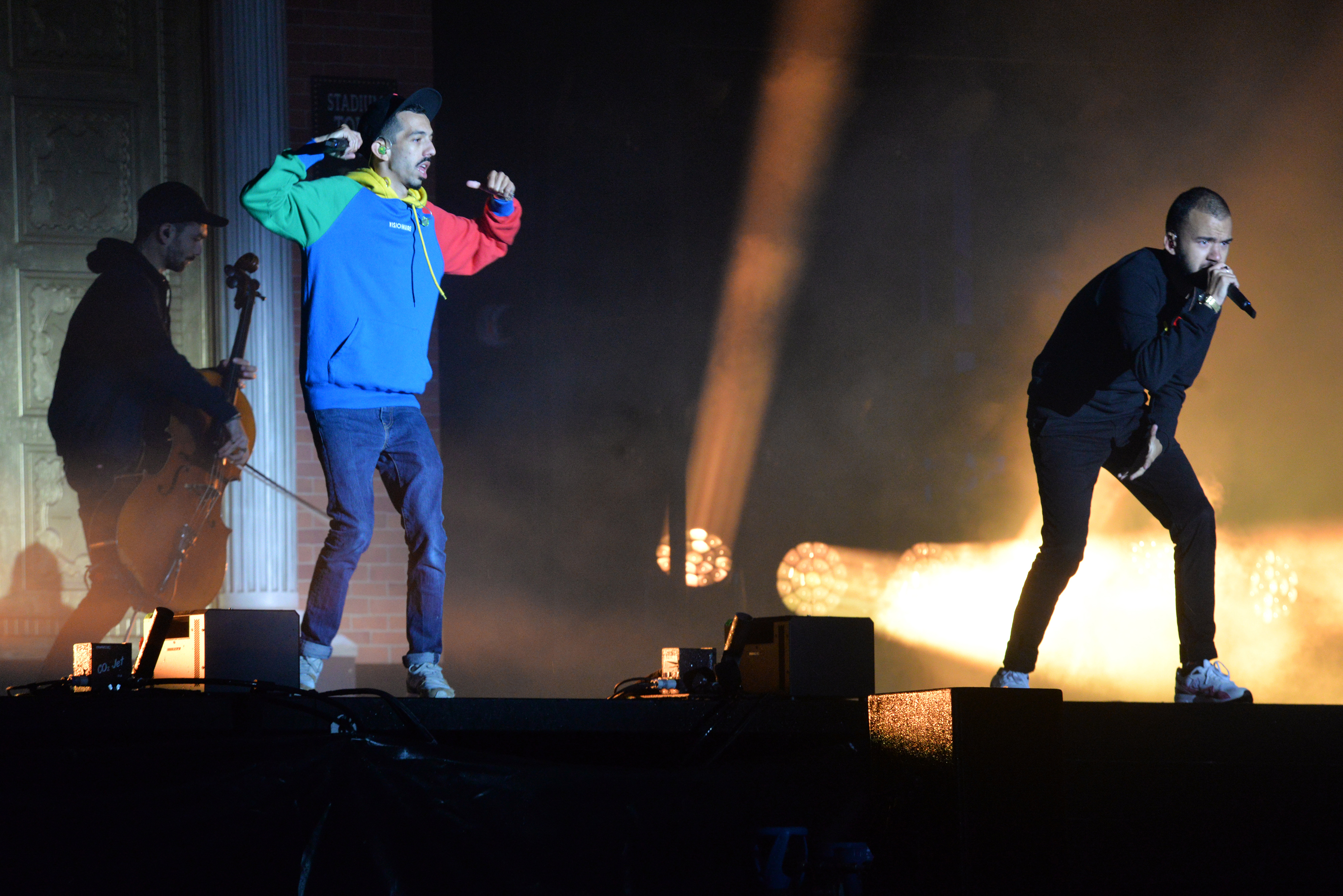
- Bigflo et Oli at the 2019 Papillons de nuit festival

Background information
- Origin: France
- Genres: French rap
- Years active: 2005–
- Label: Polydor
- Members: Florian Ordoñez; Olivio Ordoñez; Father Fabián
- Website: bigfloetoli.com

Bigflo et Oli (referred to as Bigflo & Oli) is a French hip hop duo from Toulouse. The duo is composed of two brothers, Florian "Bigflo" Ordoñez and Olivio "Oli" Ordoñez. Their debut album La Cour des grands was released in 2015 and received a gold record award in France less than four months after being released, then went platinum, making them the youngest French rappers to receive this award.

Their second album, La Vraie Vie, came out on June 23, 2017. The album was certified gold record three weeks later, platinum record three months later, on September 18, 2017, double platinum record in early December 2017 and triple platinum record in March 2018 with over 300,000 sales.

Their third album, La Vie de rêve, was released on November 23, 2018. It earned gold record status within 10 days of its release, then went platinum one month after its release.

As of October 2019, they have sold over a million copies of their albums.

== Biography ==
=== 1993–2005: Early life ===
Florian and Olivio were born from an Argentinian father, Fabian, and a French mother of Algerian descent, and grew up in the Minimes district of Toulouse, in the Occitanie region. They both received a solid musical and instrumental training from childhood, Olivio studying trumpet and Florian the drums and piano at the conservatoire de Toulouse. It was after hearing Sully Sefil's song J'voulais, released in 2001, that the two brothers started rapping, aged nine and six respectively. Their parents had already introduced them to music: their father is a salsa singer and their mother listened to a lot of chanson française when they were children (Jacques Brel, Charles Aznavour and Francis Cabrel in particular).

Bigflo is the stage name of Florian José Ordonez. He was born on January 22, 1993 (age 33), in Toulouse. After obtaining his scientific baccalauréat, Florian spent a year studying at university, in LEA (Applied Foreign Languages), then decided to stop to devote himself entirely to music. He has been playing drums and piano since the age of 13, in addition to writing his own songs.

Oli, whose real name is Olivio Laurentino Ordonez, was born on April 19, 1996 (age 30), in Villeneuve-sur-Lot. He began writing at the age of six and became involved in musical creation while preparing his economics and social sciences baccalauréat, which he obtained in 2014. Both brothers attended the lycée Saint-Sernin in Toulouse. (Note: Bigflo & Oli actually shot a music video in their high school in 2012 for their Pourquoi pas nous ? song.)

=== 2005–2014: Beginnings ===
Bigflo and Oli published their first music video on YouTube in 2005 when they were children, and completely unknown. It reached, at the time, about 400 views. They later released another clip, "Fiers d'être toulousain" in which they already show their love for their hometown, Toulouse. The two brothers grew up, keeping on writing and composing, and started to scour the local scenes as high school students. They soon made a name for themselves by taking part in rap battles, such as Rap Contenders. They play several opening acts, including French rap heavyweights like Sexion d'Assaut and La Rumeur. On July 14, 2011, they play alongside Cali for the French Fête nationale, in Toulouse. They have also shared the stage with Orelsan, 1995 or IAM.

In 2011, they release their "C'est que le début" music video. In July 2012, they publish their second clip alongside Orelsan, "Pourquoi pas nous ?" on YouTube. In October 2013, the band signs on the Polydor label. In 2014, they release an extended play called Le Trac. It contains five songs including "Monsieur tout le monde", which reveals the band to the mainstream audience. The clip, directed by Julien Hosmalin, features comedian Kyan Khojandi and tells the tragic destiny of an Average Joe who ends up losing his temper. Also published in 2014, their video "Gangsta" is shot in Toulouse.

=== 2015–2016: La Cour des grands ===
On September 11, 2015, their debut album La Cour des grands is certified gold record and they become the youngest French rappers to receive this award, at the age of 22 and 17. The duo gradually established themselves as a major force in French rap, going so far as to be considered by Akhenaton, member of IAM, as the next generation of French rap. He explains in 2016:

The first time I saw them, their mother was waiting backstage for them and it made me laugh. Then when I heard them throw their lines out, I got a huge slap in the face. They clearly went to L'École du micro d'argent.

In the face of rising success, the two brothers say that "what is happening is a childhood dream come true." In June 2015, they make a brief appearance in a YouTube video on the Squeezie channel.

In March 2015, they put out the music video for the song "Nous aussi", from their album La Cour des grands. The clip was directed by the same director as "Monsieur tout le monde". It involves three podcasters: Jhon Rachid, Baptiste Lorber as well as Jérôme Niel, famous for his tutorials broadcast on Canal+'s Grand Journal. Their music video "Le Cordon" came out in May 2015. This stop motion clip directed by Nicolas Carnol tells the story of a mother and her aborted child, confronting two opposing yet complementary perspectives. After touring France in 2015, the two brothers set off on a second tour in 2016, where they played at a number of major summer festivals. Among other things, they took part in the 3rd edition of AbbéRoad, a charity concert of the Abbé-Pierre Foundation.

=== 2017–2018: La Vraie Vie ===
Bigflo and Oli went live on Facebook on April 30, 2017, and announced the name of their second album, La Vraie Vie, scheduled for release on June 23, 2017. They also released on May 2, 2017, a song by the same name as well as an 8-minute video clip, shot at the Mont Blanc massif. On May 12, 2017, they unveiled a second single, "Alors Alors". On June 2, the duo released another music video, featuring Jamel Debbouze, called "Personne". On June 16, 2017, seven days before the album release, Bigflo and Oli announced the release of a clothing brand called Visionnaire.

The album featured a number of well-known guests such as Belgian singer Stromae who co-wrote the song "Dommage", American rapper Busta Rhymes on "Ça va trop vite" and French rap star JoeyStarr on "Trop tard". On the eponymous song "La Vraie Vie", BigFlo took a dig at rapper Orelsan, who turned down a collaboration because of a busy schedule. In July 2017, the two brothers reappeared on Squeezie's YouTube channel in a video where the three of them created a song in under an hour. The video attracted more than ten million views. The album's fourth music video came out on September 8, 2017, and featured the song "Dommage", where Panayotis Pascot and Pascale Arbillot play the roles of the characters mentioned in the song. The album was a huge success and was certified platinum on September 18, 2017, about 3 months after its release.

At the end of September 2017, Bigflo and Oli appeared once again with Squeezie with the same idea as the first video, this time the three of them making a video clip in less than twelve hours. On December 15, 2017, the group released a fifth clip, for the song "Salope!".

In January 2018, the duo is nominated in 2 categories of the Victoires de la Musique: "Urban Music Album of the Year" with La Vraie Vie and "Original Song of the Year" with "Dommage". They performed this title live with a 60-piece amateur choir from Chabeuil, discovered through to their YouTube video where they covered the song. That evening, the duo won the "Original Song of the Year" award, thanks to audience votes. Following this victory, Oli had to dye his hair blue, a challenge he took up with his big brother, following the same pattern as when the rappers won the NRJ Music Awards, when Oli finished with blond hair.

At the end of June 2018, the two brothers released a new track in collaboration with French DJ Petit Biscuit, called "Demain". About a month later, the duo released the associated video clip, mainly consisting of shots of fans dancing during their festival appearances.

=== 2018–present: La Vie de rêve ===
Bigflo and Oli announced on September 8, 2018, in an Instagram live show the release of their new album La Vraie vie 2 as a direct sequel to La Vraie vie, scheduled for release in November 2018. The album will include Florian's solo, the song "Demain" released a few months earlier, as well as the song about their mother and new features. However, on October 3, 2018, the brothers announced that it would finally be called La Vie de rêve, as they felt that the previous name would sound too much like a bonus album or an album that could not be listened to without having listened to the previous one.

On October 26, 2018, the first single (excluding "Demain") from their third album is released, Nous Aussi 2. The accompanying music video exceeded one million views in less than a day. The next single was released a few days later, on October 31, and was entitled "Plus Tard".

The album was released on November 23, 2018 and was a huge success, selling more than 44,000 copies in the first week, almost twice as many as its predecessor and was certified gold record after only 10 days, then platinum in less than a month. Adding to the album's success, it was given the "Urban Music Album of the Year" award during the 2019 Victoires de la Musique, where the siblings were also named "Male Group or Artist of the Year". On February 11, 2019, they released the video for "Rentrez chez vous", song they performed a few days earlier at the Victoires ceremony.

They went on a year-long tour, and notably played two days in a row at Stadium de Toulouse, where no concerts had been given since Michael Jackson's 1992 performance during his Dangerous World Tour. They also released "Allez le Stade", a song dedicated to the Stade Toulousain's 20th French Championship title. In July 2019, they declared their intention to pause their career after their tour and the summer festivals, in order to "settle down and recover".

In 2020, they nonetheless released two EPs, Freestyles Insolents, compilation of their YouTube-released freestyle tracks, and Un été quand même, joint release with Bon Entendeur. They also appeared on L.E.J's "Tu es" and Marseille-based rapper Jul's "Que ça dure".

== Discography ==
=== Albums ===
Title	Album details	Peak chart positions					Certifications (sales thresholds)
Title	Album details	FRA	BEL (FL)	BEL (WA)	SWI	SWI (ROM)	Certifications (sales thresholds)
La Cour des grands	Released: 1 June 2015; Label: Polydor; Format: CD, digital	2	123	6	19	5	SNEP: Gold
La Vraie Vie	Released: 23 June 2017; Label: Polydor; Format: CD, digital	1	179	1	5	1	SNEP: Diamond
La Vie de rêve	Released: 23 November 2018; Label: Polydor; Format: CD, digital	2	129	2	6	3	SNEP: 3× Platinum
Les autres c'est nous	Released: 24 June 2022; Label: Polydor; Format: CD, digital	1	97	1	2	—	SNEP: 2× Platinum
Karma	Released: 13 March 2026; Label: Polydor; Format: CD, digital	2					
"—" denotes a recording that did not chart or was not released in that territory.

=== Extended plays ===
Title	Notes	Peak chart positions
Title	Notes	FRA
Le Trac	Released: 24 April 2014; Label: Polydor; Format: Digital	49
Insolents	Released: 3 July 2020; Label: Polydor; Format: Digital	—
Un été quand même (with Bon Entendeur)	Released: 17 July 2020; Label: Polydor; Format: Digital	—
"—" denotes a recording that did not chart or was not released in that territory.

=== Singles ===
==== As lead artists ====
Title	Year	Peak chart positions				Certifications (sales thresholds)	Album
Title	Year	FRA	BEL (WA)	SWI	SWI (ROM)	Certifications (sales thresholds)	Album
"Comme d'hab"	2015	63	5 (Note: The track did not appear in the Ultratop 50 charts, but rather in the bubbling under Wallonian Ultratip charts.)	—	—		Non-album single
"Gangsta"	2015	168	—	—	—		Le Trac
"Mytho"	2015	25	5	—	—		La Vraie Vie
"Je suis"	2016	86	—	—	—	SNEP: Gold	La Vraie Vie
"Pour un pote" (featuring Jean Dujardin)	2016	23	18	—	—		Brice 3 soundtrack
"Alors alors"	2017	50	27	—	—	SNEP: Gold	La Vraie Vie
"Personne"	2017	99	29	—	—	SNEP: Gold	La Vraie Vie
"Dommage"	2017	11	46	88	5	SNEP: Diamond	La Vraie Vie
"Papa"	2018	138	—	—	—	SNEP: Gold	La Vraie Vie
"Demain" (with Petit Biscuit)	2018	5	4	91	7	SNEP: Platinum	La Vie de rêve
"Nous aussi 2"	2018	68	27	—	—		La Vie de rêve
"Plus tard"	2018	74	7	—	12	SNEP: Gold	La Vie de rêve
"Rentrez chez vous"	2019	106	—	—	—		La Vie de rêve
"Sur la lune"	2019	81	1	—	—	SNEP: Gold	La Vie de rêve
"Promesses"	2019	100	5	—	—		La Vie de rêve
"Sacré bordel"	2022	55	—	—	—		Les autres c'est nous
"J'étais pas là"	2022	38	—	—	—		Les autres c'est nous
"Coup de vieux" (featuring Julien Doré)	2022	75	3	—	—		Les autres c'est nous
"Dernière"	2023	—	48	—	—		Non-album single
"Picasso"	2026	53	—	—	—	Karma	
"—" denotes a recording that did not chart or was not released in that territory.

==== As featured artists ====
Title	Year	Peak chart positions	Album
Title	Year	FRA	Album
"Pas du même monde" (Guizmo featuring Bigflo & Oli)	2018	152	Non-album single
"L'Hymne de nos campagnes 2019" (Tryo featuring Claudio Capéo, Vianney, Gauvain Sers, Bigflo & Oli, Boulevard des Airs, L.E.J & ZAZ)	2019	183	XXV

=== Other charted songs ===
Title	Year	Peak chart positions		Album
Title	Year	FRA	BEL (WA)	Album
"Monsieur tout le monde"	2014	146	—	Le Trac
"Nous aussi"	2015	120	—	La Cour des grands
"Aujourd'hui"	2016	—	33	La Cour des grands
"La vraie vie"	2017	152	22	La vraie vie
"Salope !"	2017	136	—	La vraie vie
"Répondez-moi"	2017	165	—	La vraie vie
"La vie normale"	2017	155	—	La vraie vie
"Autre part"	2017	191	—	La vraie vie
"Trop tard" (featuring Joeystarr)	2017	120	—	La vraie vie
"Ça va trop vite" (featuring Busta Rhymes)	2017	148	—	La vraie vie
"Olivio" (credited to only "Oli")	2017	179	—	La vraie vie
"Bienvenue chez moi"	2018	117	—	La Vie de rêve
"Maman"	2018	136	—	La Vie de rêve
"Florian"	2018	140	—	La Vie de rêve
"Rendez-vous là-haut"	2018	191	—	La Vie de rêve
"Il est où ton frère?"	2018	197	—	La Vie de rêve
"La seule" (featuring Naâman and Kacem Wapalek)	2018	129	—	La Vie de rêve
"Ferme les yeux" (featuring Tryo)	2018	148	—	La Vie de rêve
"C'est que du rap" (featuring Soprano and Black M)	2018	66	—	La Vie de rêve
"Bigflo & Oli" (Caballero & JeanJass featuring Bigflo & Oli)	2020	200	—	High & fines herbes
"Que ça dure" (Jul featuring Bigflo & Oli)	2020	30	—	La Machine
"—" denotes a recording that did not chart or was not released in that territory.

== Awards ==
List of awards and nominations received by Bigflo et Oli
Year	Award	Category	Nominee(s)	Result	Ref.
2016	Prix Talents W9	—	Bigflo & Oli	Finalists	
2017	Grand prix SACEM	Rolf Marbot Song of the Year Award	"Je suis"	Won	
2017	NRJ Music Award	Francophone Duo/Group of the Year	Bigflo & Oli	Won	
2018	Aficia Awards	Francophone Duo/Group of the Year	Bigflo & Oli	Won	
2018	MTV Europe Music Award	Best French Act	Bigflo & Oli	Won	
2018	NRJ Music Award	Francophone Duo/Group of the Year	Bigflo & Oli	Won	
2018	NRJ Music Award	Video of the Year	"Demain"	Won	
2018	Victoires de la Musique	Original Song of the Year	"Dommage"	Won	
2018	Victoires de la Musique	Urban Music Album of the Year	La Vraie Vie	Nominated	
2019	NRJ Music Award	Francophone Duo/Group of the Year	Bigflo & Oli	Won	
2019	NRJ Music Award	Video of the Year	"Promesses"	Won	
2019	Victoires de la Musique	Male Group or Artist of the Year	Bigflo & Oli	Won	
2019	Victoires de la Musique	Urban Music Album of the Year	La Vie de rêve	Won	

=== Distinctions ===
On March 23, 2017, they were made chevaliers de l'Ordre des Arts et des Lettres by the Minister of Culture.
