= DKR (song) =

Single by Booba
- Released: 30 September 2016
- Genre: Rap
- Length: 2:56
- Songwriter: Booba

"DKR" is a song by Booba released in 2016.

== Chart performance ==
=== Weekly charts ===
Chart (2016)	Peak position
Belgium (Ultratop 50 Wallonia)	42
France (SNEP)	1
Switzerland (Schweizer Hitparade)	42
