= Feder (DJ) =

French DJ (born 1987)

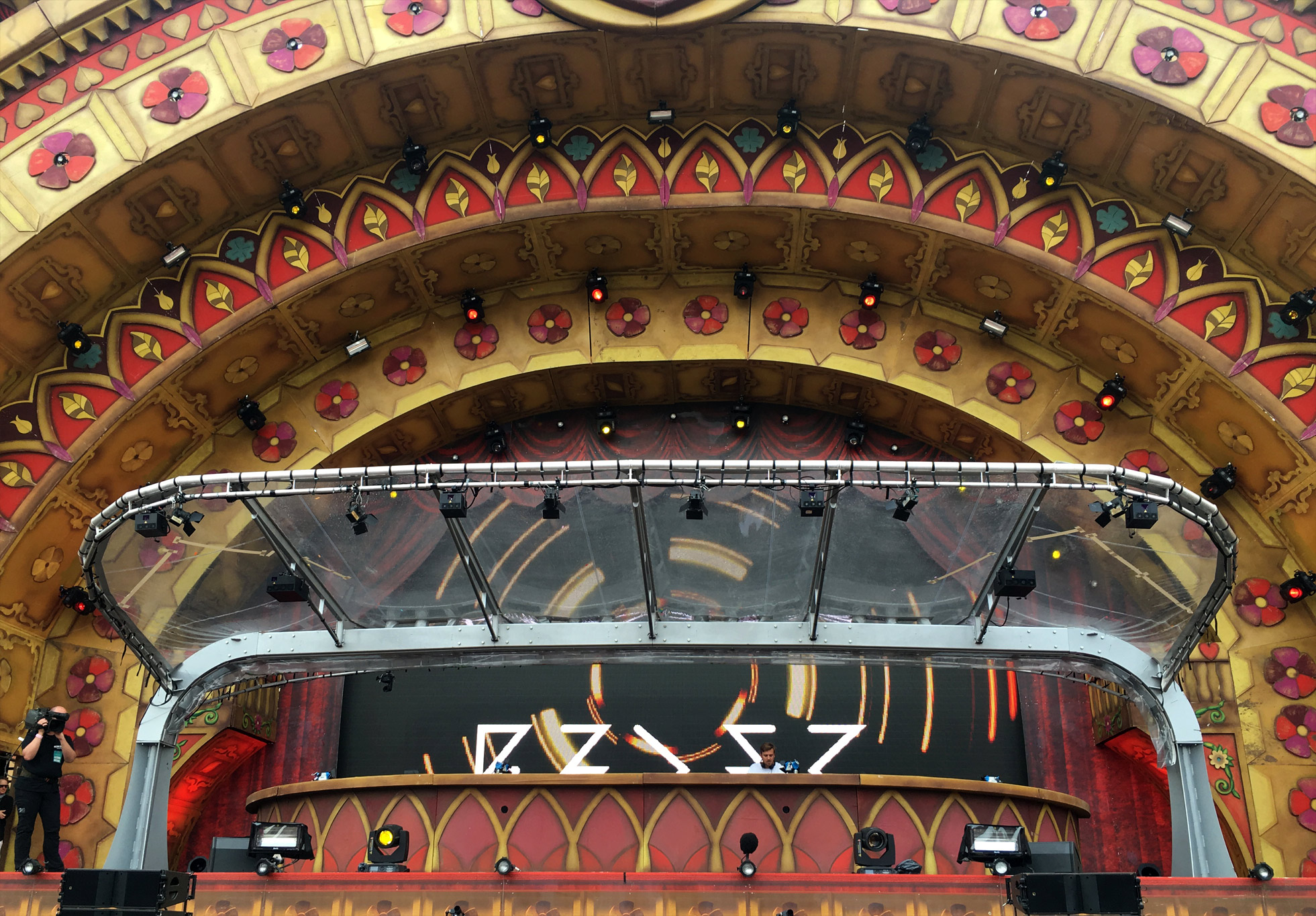
Feder at Tomorrowland, Belgium, July 2016

Hadrien Federiconi (born 5 September 1987), better known by his stage name Feder, is a French DJ from Nice.

== Biography ==
Currently based in Paris, he gained fame in 2014 through "Sixto", his remix of Rodriguez' song "Can't Get Away".

He signed to Atlantic Records (Warner Music) and he gained international chart success through his own track "Goodbye" featuring vocals of Lyse (Anne-Lyse Blanc). The song "Goodbye" reached number one in sales in France and Switzerland, as well as number one on iTunes charts for France, Italy, Belgium, Switzerland, Russia, Hungary, Turkey, Czech Republic and Top 10 on iTunes in Germany, Greece, Denmark, Spain, Netherlands, Austria and South Africa. Feder won 'Best New French DJ' at the 2015 NRJ DJ Awards.

In 2018, he produced and co-composed the album of the French singer Mylène Farmer titled Désobéissance.

== Discography ==
=== Singles ===
Title	Year	Peak chart positions										Certifications	Album
Title	Year	FRA	AUT	BEL (FL)	BEL (WA)	GER	ITA	NLD	SPA	SWI	US Dance	Certifications	Album
"Goodbye" (featuring Lyse)	2015	1	6	3	1	8	11	26	6	1	49	SNEP: Gold; BEA: Platinum; BVMI: Platinum; FIMI: Platinum; IFPI SWI: Platinum	Non-album singles
"Blind" (featuring Emmi)	2015	5	39	—^{[A]}	50	78	—	—	—	25	—	SNEP: Platinum	Non-album singles
"Lordly" (featuring Alex Aiono)	2016	10	—	—	36	—	—	—	—	—	—	SNEP: Diamond	Non-album singles
"Back for More" (featuring Daecolm)	2017	54	—	—	—	—	—	—	—	—	—	SNEP: Gold	Non-album singles
"Private Dancer" (with Julian Perretta)	2017	41	—	—	—	—	—	—	—	—	—		Non-album singles
"Breathe"	2017	10	—	—	—	—	—	—	—	—	—	SNEP: Platinum	Non-album singles
"Control" (featuring Bryce Vine and Dan Caplen)	2018	116	—	—	—	—	—	—	—	—	—	SNEP: Gold	Non-album singles
"—" denotes a recording that did not chart or was not released in that territory.
