= List of number-one singles of 2016 (Spain) =

This lists the singles that reached number one on the Spanish Promusicae sales and airplay charts in 2016. Total sales correspond to the data sent by regular contributors to sales volumes and by digital distributors.

== Chart history ==
Week	Issue date	Top Streaming, Downloads & Physical Sales			Most Airplay		
Week	Issue date	Artist(s)	Song	Ref.	Artist(s)	Song	Ref.
1	January 7	Justin Bieber	"Sorry"		Adele	"Hello"	
2	January 14	Justin Bieber	"Sorry"		Pablo López featuring Juanes	"Tu enemigo"	
3	January 21	Justin Bieber	"Sorry"		Pablo López featuring Juanes	"Tu enemigo"	
4	January 28	Justin Bieber	"Sorry"		Pablo López featuring Juanes	"Tu enemigo"	
5	February 4	Justin Bieber	"Sorry"		Pablo López featuring Juanes	"Tu enemigo"	
6	February 11	Justin Bieber	"Sorry"		Pablo López featuring Juanes	"Tu enemigo"	
7	February 18	Justin Bieber	"Sorry"		Pablo López featuring Juanes	"Tu enemigo"	
8	February 25	Justin Bieber	"Sorry"		Matt Simons	"Catch & Release" (Deepend Remix)	
9	March 3	Justin Bieber	"Sorry"		Major Lazer featuring Nyla & Fuse ODG	"Light It Up" (Remix)	
10	March 10	Justin Bieber	"Sorry"		Alan Walker	"Faded"	
11	March 17	Alan Walker	"Faded"		Alan Walker	"Faded"	
12	March 24	Alan Walker	"Faded"		Alan Walker	"Faded"	
13	March 31	Alan Walker	"Faded"		Matt Simons	"Catch & Release" (Deepend Remix)	
14	April 7	Alan Walker	"Faded"		Matt Simons	"Catch & Release" (Deepend Remix)	
15	April 14	Alan Walker	"Faded"		Alan Walker	"Faded"	
16	April 21	Sia	"Cheap Thrills"		Matt Simons	"Catch & Release" (Deepend Remix)	
17	April 28	Enrique Iglesias featuring Wisin	"Duele el Corazón"		Lukas Graham	"7 Years"	
18	May 5	Enrique Iglesias featuring Wisin	"Duele el Corazón"		Alan Walker	"Faded"	
19	May 12	Enrique Iglesias featuring Wisin	"Duele el Corazón"		Alan Walker	"Faded"	
20	May 19	Enrique Iglesias featuring Wisin	"Duele el Corazón"		Enrique Iglesias featuring Wisin	"Duele el Corazón"	
21	May 26	Enrique Iglesias featuring Wisin	"Duele el Corazón"		Enrique Iglesias featuring Wisin	"Duele el Corazón"	
22	June 2	Enrique Iglesias featuring Wisin	"Duele el Corazón"		Enrique Iglesias featuring Wisin	"Duele el Corazón"	
23	June 9	Enrique Iglesias featuring Wisin	"Duele el Corazón"		Enrique Iglesias featuring Wisin	"Duele el Corazón"	
24	June 16	Enrique Iglesias featuring Wisin	"Duele el Corazón"		Enrique Iglesias featuring Wisin	"Duele el Corazón"	
25	June 23	Enrique Iglesias featuring Wisin	"Duele el Corazón"		Morat	"Cómo te atreves"	
26	June 30	Enrique Iglesias featuring Wisin	"Duele el Corazón"		Morat	"Cómo te atreves"	
27	July 7	Enrique Iglesias featuring Wisin	"Duele el Corazón"		Morat	"Cómo te atreves"	
28	July 14	Enrique Iglesias featuring Wisin	"Duele el Corazón"		Morat	"Cómo te atreves"	
29	July 21	Carlos Vives and Shakira	"La Bicicleta"		Jennifer Lopez	"Ain't Your Mama"	
30	July 28	Carlos Vives and Shakira	"La Bicicleta"		Jennifer Lopez	"Ain't Your Mama"	
31	August 4	Carlos Vives and Shakira	"La Bicicleta"		Jennifer Lopez	"Ain't Your Mama"	
32	August 11	Carlos Vives and Shakira	"La Bicicleta"		Jennifer Lopez	"Ain't Your Mama"	
33	August 18	Carlos Vives and Shakira	"La Bicicleta"		Justin Timberlake	"Can't Stop the Feeling!"	
34	August 25	Carlos Vives and Shakira	"La Bicicleta"		Justin Timberlake	"Can't Stop the Feeling!"	
35	September 1	Carlos Vives and Shakira	"La Bicicleta"		Carlos Vives and Shakira	"La Bicicleta"	
36	September 8	Carlos Vives and Shakira	"La Bicicleta"		Carlos Vives and Shakira	"La Bicicleta"	
37	September 15	Carlos Vives and Shakira	"La Bicicleta"		Carlos Vives and Shakira	"La Bicicleta"	
38	September 22	Carlos Vives and Shakira	"La Bicicleta"		Justin Timberlake	"Can't Stop the Feeling!"	
39	September 29	Carlos Vives and Shakira	"La Bicicleta"		Jonas Blue featuring JP Cooper	"Perfect Strangers"	
40	October 6	Carlos Vives and Shakira	"La Bicicleta"		Jonas Blue featuring JP Cooper	"Perfect Strangers"	
41	October 13	Carlos Vives and Shakira	"La Bicicleta"		Jonas Blue featuring JP Cooper	"Perfect Strangers"	
42	October 20	J Balvin featuring Pharrell Williams, BIA and Sky	"Safari"		DJ Snake featuring Justin Bieber	"Let Me Love You"	
43	October 27	J Balvin featuring Pharrell Williams, BIA and Sky	"Safari"		DJ Snake featuring Justin Bieber	"Let Me Love You"	
44	November 3	J Balvin featuring Pharrell Williams, BIA and Sky	"Safari"		Leiva	"Sincericidio"	
45	November 10	Shakira featuring Maluma	"Chantaje"		DJ Snake featuring Justin Bieber	"Let Me Love You"	
46	November 17	Sebastián Yatra	"Traicionera"		Bruno Mars	"24K Magic"	
47	November 24	Shakira featuring Maluma	"Chantaje"		Bruno Mars	"24K Magic"	
48	December 1	Shakira featuring Maluma	"Chantaje"		DJ Snake featuring Justin Bieber	"Let Me Love You"	
49	December 8	Shakira featuring Maluma	"Chantaje"		DJ Snake featuring Justin Bieber	"Let Me Love You"	
50	December 15	Shakira featuring Maluma	"Chantaje"		LP	"Lost on You"	
51	December 22	Shakira featuring Maluma	"Chantaje"		DJ Snake featuring Justin Bieber	"Let Me Love You"	
52	December 29	Shakira featuring Maluma	"Chantaje"		LP	"Lost on You"	
