= Let's Dance (German TV series) season 10 =

Let's Dance
- Season 10
- Celebrity winner: Gil Ofarim
- Professional winner: Ekaterina Leonova
- No. of episodes: 13

Release
- Original network: RTL Television
- Original release: February 24 (launch); March 17, 2017 – June 9, 2017

Season chronology
- ← Previous; Season 9 Next → Season 11

The tenth season of Let's Dance started on February 24, 2017, with the first ever launch show and continued with the normal competition from March 17. Sylvie Meis and Daniel Hartwich returned as hosts. Motsi Mabuse, Joachim Llambi and Jorge González also returned as the judges.

== Couples ==
The first twelve celebrities were announced in January 2017. While Vanessa Mai and Pietro Lombardi were announced as the final contestants a few days later. On February 22, all professional dancers were revealed by RTL. Christian Polanc, Massimo Sinató, Oana Nechiti, Erich Klann, Ekaterina Leonova, Vadim Garbuzov, Sergiu Luca, Kathrin Menzinger, Isabel Edvardsson and Robert Beitsch are all returning from last season, Sarah Latton and Marta Arndt are returning after a 2 and 4 years break, while only two new pros (Christina Luft and Andrzej Cibis) were announced. Pietro Lombardi had to withdraw from the competition on the launch show because of an injury on his foot. He will be replaced. He would have danced with new pro Christina Luft. On March 3 it was announced that Giovanni Zarrella replace Lombardi.

On May 23 it was announced that Heinrich Popow would withdraw from the competition for health reasons including a tendon rupture in his right shoulder. Owing to the rules of the show, Giovanni Zarrella, who had been eliminated the week before, was reinvited to participate on the show again.

Celebrity	Notability (known for)	Professional partner	Status
Jörg Draeger	Television presenter	Marta Arndt	Eliminated 1st on March 17, 2017
Chiara Ohoven	Socialite	Vadim Garbuzov	Eliminated 2nd on March 24, 2017
Bastiaan Ragas	Singer	Sarah Latton	Eliminated 3rd on March 31, 2017
Anni Friesinger-Postma	Former speed skater	Erich Klann	Eliminated 4th on April 7, 2017
Ann-Kathrin Brömmel	Model	Sergiu Luca	Eliminated 5th on April 21, 2017
Susi Kentikian	Boxer	Robert Beitsch	Eliminated 6th on April 28, 2017
Cheyenne Pahde	Actress	Andrzej Cibis	Eliminated 7th on May 5, 2017
Maximilian Arland	Television presenter	Isabel Edvardsson (Week 1–4); Sarah Latton (Week 5–8)	Eliminated 8th on May 12, 2017
Heinrich Popow	Sprinter	Kathrin Menzinger	Withdrew on May 23, 2017
Faisal Kawusi	Comedian	Oana Nechiti	Eliminated 9th on May 26, 2017
Giovanni Zarrella	Singer	Christina Luft (Week 1–4); Marta Arndt (Week 5–11)	Eliminated 10th on June 2, 2017
Angelina Kirsch	Model	Massimo Sinató	Third place on June 9, 2017
Vanessa Mai	Singer	Christian Polanc	Runner-Up on June 9, 2017
Gil Ofarim	Singer	Ekaterina Leonova	Winner on June 9, 2017

== Scoring chart ==
Couple	Place	1		2	3	4			5	6	7			8			9			10			11 Semi-Finals				12 Finals			
Couple	Place	(Note: Score from the launch show)	(Note: Score from the first live show)	2	3	(Note: Score from the first dance)	(Note: Score from the Boys vs Girls dance)	Σ	5	6	(Note: Score from the first dance)	(Note: Score from the team dance)	Σ	(Note: Score from the first dance)	(Note: Score from the Disco Marathon)	Σ	(Note: Score from the first dance)	(Note: Score from the duel dance)	Σ	(Note: Score from the first dance)	(Note: Score from the Schlager Fusion Dance)	Σ	(Note: Score from the first dance)	(Note: Score from the second dance)	(Note: Score from the impro dance)	Σ	(Note: Score from the first dance)	(Note: Score from the second dance)	(Note: Score from the Freestyle)	Σ
Gil & Ekaterina	1	16	20	30	30	30	+9	39	21	23	27	20	47	29	+1	30	29	30	59	24	30	54	29	29	22	80	29	30	29	88
Vanessa & Christian	2	23	29	26	23	30	+7	37	25	30	30	22	52	30	+10	40	29	30	59	29	30	59	23	30	25	78	27	30	30	87
Angelina & Massimo	3	18	16	23	23	26	+7	33	28	27	30	20	50	26	+4	30	28	21	49	26	26	52	22	20	25	67	23	30	28	81
Giovanni & Marta/Christina	4	—N/a	11	19	23	20	+9	29	30	16	25	20	45	24	+10	34	19	28	47	19	19	38	19	27	25	71				
Faisal & Oana	5	18	12	18	12	22	+9	31	22	23	21	22	43	9	+3	12	26	24	50	12	11	23								
Heinrich & Kathrin	6	11	14	18	25	19	+9	28	24	17	15	22	37	13	+6	19	13	22	35											
Maximilian & Sarah/Isabel	7	13	14	10	14	10	+9	19	19	10	22	20	42	23	+2	25														
Cheyenne & Andrzej	8	18	25	15	11	20	+7	27	26	20	17	22	39																	
Susi & Robert	9	15	25	17	11	20	+7	27	16	16																				
Ann-Kathrin & Sergiu	10	10	19	21	26	24	+7	31	20																					
Anni & Erich	11	9	13	15	9	14	+7	21																						
Bastiaan & Sarah	12	19	—N/a (Note: Baastian was given by due to an appendectomy)	15	16																									
Chiara & Vadim	13	12	12	8																										
Jörg & Marta	14	7	7																											

Red numbers indicates the lowest score for each week.
Green numbers indicates the highest score for each week.
indicates the couple eliminated that week.
indicates the returning couple that finished in the bottom two.
indicates the couple which was immune from elimination.
indicates the couple that withdrew from the competition.
indicates the couple was eliminated but later returned to the competition.
indicates the winning couple.
indicates the runner-up couple.
indicates the third-place couple.

=== Averages ===
This table only counts for dances scored on a traditional 30-points scale.

Rank by average	Place	Couple	Total	Dances	Average
1	2	Vanessa & Christian	551	20	27.5
2	1	Gil & Ekaterina	527	20	26.4
3	3	Angelina & Massimo	486	20	24.3
4	4	Giovanni & Marta/Christina	344	16	21.5
5	10	Ann-Kathrin & Sergiu	120	6	20.0
6	8	Cheyenne & Andrzej	174	9	19.3
7	5	Faisal & Oana	252	14	18.0
8	6	Heinrich & Kathrin	213	12	17.8
9	9	Susi & Robert	120	7	17.1
10	12	Bastiaan & Sarah	50	3	16.7
11	7	Maximilian & Sarah/Isabel	155	10	15.5
12	11	Anni & Erich	60	5	12.0
13	13	Chiara & Vadim	32	3	10.7
14	14	Jörg & Marta	14	2	7.0

=== Highest and lowest scoring performances ===
The best and worst performances in each dance according to the judges' marks are as follows:

Dance	Best dancer(s)	Best score	Worst dancer(s)	Worst score
Cha-cha-cha	Vanessa Mai	30	Jörg Drager	7
Quickstep	Vanessa Mai	29	Cheyenne Pahde; Susi Kentikian	11
Waltz	Angelina Kirsch	28	Anni Friesinger-Postma; Faisal Kawusi	9
Viennese waltz	Cheyenne Pahde; Giovanni Zarrella	25	Anni Friesinger-Postma	13
Rumba	Gil Ofarim	29	Maximilian Arland	10
Jive	Gil Ofarim	29	Maximilian Arland	19
Foxtrot	Vanessa Mai	30	Maximilian Arland	14
Salsa	Gil Ofarim; Vanessa Mai	30	Maximilian Arland	10
Tango	Vanessa Mai	30	Anni Friesinger-Postma	15
Argentine tango	Gil Ofarim (twice)	30	Giovanni Zarrella	23
Contemporary	Gil Ofarim; Vanessa Mai; Giovanni Zarrella; Angelina Kirsch (twice)	30	Heinrich Popow	13
Samba	Gil Ofarim	27	Heinrich Popow	13
Paso doble	Vanessa Mai	30	Anni Friesinger-Postma	14
Bollywood	Faisal Kawusi	26	-	
Flamenco	Gil Ofarim; Vanessa Mai	30	-	
Disco Marathon	Vanessa Mai; Giovanni Zarrella	10	Gil Ofarim	1
Jazz	Giovanni Zarrella	19	-	
Team Dance	Vanessa Mai; Cheyenne Pahde; Faisal Kawusi; Heinrich Popow	22	Angelina Kirsch; Giovanni Zarrella; Maximilian Arland; Gil Ofarim	20
Charleston	Giovanni Zarrella	28	Angelina Kirsch	21
Fusion dance	Gil Ofarim; Vanessa Mai	30	Faisal Kawusi	11
Street	Faisal Kawusi	24	Heinrich Popow	22
Freestyle (Finale)	Vanessa Mai	30	Angelina Kirsch	28

=== Couples' Highest and lowest scoring performances ===
According to the traditional 30-point scale. Pietro Lombardi is not listed because he withdrew before the first live show.

Couples	Highest Scoring Dances	Score	Lowest Scoring Dances	Score
Gil & Ekaterina	Salsa, Contemporary, Argentine tango (twice), Flamenco & Fusion dance	30	Quickstep	16
Vanessa & Christian	Contemporary, Paso doble, Foxtrot, Salsa, Flamenco, Fusion dance, Tango, Cha-cha-cha & Freestyle	30	Cha-cha-cha, Waltz & Rumba	23
Angelina & Massimo	Contemporary (twice)	30	Cha-cha-cha	16
Giovanni & Marta/Christina	Contemporary	30	Cha-cha-cha	11
Faisal & Oana	Bollywood	26	Waltz	9
Heinrich & Kathrin	Contemporary	25	Cha-cha-cha	11
Maximilian & Sarah/Isabel	Tango	23	Salsa, Rumba & Cha-cha-cha	10
Cheyenne & Andrzej	Paso doble	26	Quickstep	11
Susi & Robert	Cha-cha-cha	25	Quickstep	11
Ann-Kathrin & Sergiu	Tango	26	Waltz	10
Anni & Erich	Tango	15	Waltz & Cha-cha-cha	9
Bastiaan & Sarah	Quickstep	19	Rumba	15
Chiara & Vadim	Waltz	12	Cha-cha-cha	8
Jörg & Marta	Cha-cha-cha	7	Cha-cha-cha	7

== Weekly scores and songs ==
=== Launch show ===
For the first time there was a launch show in which each celebrity meets his partner. This show was aired on 24 February 2017. In this first live show the couples then danced in groups and each couple got points by the judges and the viewers. At the end of the show the couple with the highest combined points was granted immunity from the first elimination. Pietro Lombardi was unable to perform due to an injury on his foot and had to withdraw from the competition. He was replaced during the next days. Vanessa Mai won the immunity from the first elimination.

Key
Celebrity won immunity from the first elimination

The Team dances

Order	Couple	Dance	Music	Judge's Scores			
Order	Couple	Dance	Music	(Cuba) Gonzalez	(South Africa) Mabuse	(Spain) Llambi	Total
1	Angelina Kirsch	Cha-cha-cha	"Lady Marmalade" - Labelle	6	6	6	18
1	Susi Kentikian	Cha-cha-cha	"Lady Marmalade" - Labelle	5	5	5	15
1	Vanessa Mai	Cha-cha-cha	"Lady Marmalade" - Labelle	8	7	8	23
2	Anni Friesinger-Postma	Waltz	"Say Something" - A Great Big World & Christina Aguilera	3	4	2	9
2	Cheyenne Pahde	Waltz	"Say Something" - A Great Big World & Christina Aguilera	6	7	5	18
2	Ann-Kathrin Brömmel	Waltz	"Say Something" - A Great Big World & Christina Aguilera	4	4	2	10
2	Chiara Ohoven	Waltz	"Say Something" - A Great Big World & Christina Aguilera	4	4	4	12
3	Maxi Arland	Quickstep	"Sunny" - Bobby Hebb	5	5	3	13
3	Gil Ofarim	Quickstep	"Sunny" - Bobby Hebb	6	6	4	16
3	Bastiaan Ragas	Quickstep	"Sunny" - Bobby Hebb	6	7	6	19
4	Faisal Kawusi	Cha-cha-cha	"Party Rock Anthem" - LMFAO ft. Lauren Bennett & GoonRock	6	8	4	18
4	Heinrich Popow	Cha-cha-cha	"Party Rock Anthem" - LMFAO ft. Lauren Bennett & GoonRock	4	4	3	11
4	Jörg Draeger	Cha-cha-cha	"Party Rock Anthem" - LMFAO ft. Lauren Bennett & GoonRock	3	3	1	7

=== Week 1 ===
- During the launch show on February 24, Pietro Lombardi announced his withdrawal from the show due to his injury. There will be a replacement for Lombardi in form of Giovanni Zarrella.
- Vanessa Mai was immune from elimination after earning it in the launch show.
- Each couple reprised the dance the celebrity danced during the launch show.
- Baastian Ragas could not dance this week due to an appendectomy and was given by.

Running order

Order	Couple	Dance	Music	Judge's Scores				Result
Order	Couple	Dance	Music	(Cuba) Gonzalez	(South Africa) Mabuse	(Spain) Llambi	Total	Result
1	Angelina & Massimo	Cha-cha-cha	"Itsy Bitsy Teenie Weenie Honolulu Strandbikini" - Caterina Valente	6	6	4	16	Safe
2	Maxi & Isabel	Quickstep	"Cheri Cheri Lady" - Modern Talking	6	5	3	14	Safe
3	Anni & Erich	Viennese waltz	"Bed of Roses" - Bon Jovi	5	5	3	13	Safe
4	Susi & Robert	Cha-cha-cha	"Fame" - Irene Cara	9	9	7	25	Safe
5	Faisal & Oana	Cha-cha-cha	"I'm Too Sexy" - Right Said Fred	5	5	2	12	Safe
6	Gil & Ekaterina	Quickstep	"Happy" - Pharrell Williams	8	7	5	20	Safe
7	Ann-Kathrin & Sergiu	Waltz	"Märchen schreibt die Zeit" - Angela Lansbury	7	7	5	19	Safe
8	Jörg & Marta	Cha-cha-cha	"Marmor, Stein und Eisen bricht" - Drafi Deutscher	3	3	1	7	Eliminated
9	Heinrich & Kathrin	Cha-cha-cha	"This Girl" - Cookin' on 3 Burners vs Kungs	5	5	4	14	Safe
10	Chiara & Vadim	Waltz	"Hero" - Mariah Carey	5	4	3	12	Bottom two
11	Giovanni & Christina	Cha-cha-cha	"Geiles Leben" - Glasperlenspiel	4	5	2	11	Bottom three
12	Cheyenne & Andrzej	Viennese waltz	"Love on the Brain" - Rihanna	9	9	7	25	Safe
13	Vanessa & Christian	Cha-cha-cha	"Don't Be So Shy" - Imany	10	10	9	29	Immune
—N/a	Bastiaan & Sarah	Given by						

=== Week 2: 80's Special ===
Running order

Order	Couple	Dance	Music	Judge's Scores				Result
Order	Couple	Dance	Music	(Cuba) Gonzalez	(South Africa) Mabuse	(Spain) Llambi	Total	Result
1	Cheyenne & Andrzej	Cha-cha-cha	"Never Gonna Give You Up" - Rick Astley	6	6	3	15	Bottom two
2	Angelina & Massimo	Foxtrot	"Perfect" - Fairground Attraction	8	9	6	23	Safe
3	Gil & Ekaterina	Salsa	"Bamboleo" - Gipsy Kings	10	10	10	30	Safe
4	Faisal & Oana	Tango	"Der Kommissar" - Falco	7	7	4	18	Safe
5	Chiara & Vadim	Cha-cha-cha	"Holiday" - Madonna	4	3	1	8	Eliminated
6	Maxi & Isabel	Salsa	"I Still Haven't Found What I'm Looking For" - Cover by Rhythms Del Mundo	4	4	2	10	Safe
7	Susi & Robert	Rumba	"Do You Really Want to Hurt Me" - Culture Club	7	6	4	17	Safe
8	Ann-Kathrin & Sergiu	Jive	"Nur geträumt" - Nena	7	8	6	21	Safe
9	Giovanni & Christina	Foxtrot	"Your Eyes (La Boum 2)" - Cook da Books	7	7	5	19	Safe
10	Anni & Erich	Tango	"Twist in My Sobriety" - Tanita Tikaram	6	5	4	15	Safe
11	Heinrich & Kathrin	Foxtrot	"Wonderful Life" - Colin Vearncombe	7	7	4	18	Safe
12	Bastiaan & Sarah	Rumba	"Holding Back the Years" - Simply Red	6	6	3	15	Bottom three
13	Vanessa & Christian	Jive	"Kids in America" - Kim Wilde	9	9	8	26	Safe

=== Week 3: 90's Special ===
Running order

Order	Couple	Dance	Music	Judge's Scores				Result
Order	Couple	Dance	Music	(Cuba) Gonzalez	(South Africa) Mabuse	(Spain) Llambi	Total	Result
1	Giovanni & Christina	Argentine tango	"Be My Lover" - La Bouche	8	8	7	23	Safe
2	Susi & Robert	Quickstep	"Narcotic" - Liquido	5	5	1	11	Safe
3	Faisal & Oana	Rumba	"I Swear" - All-4-One	5	5	2	12	Safe
4	Bastiaan & Sarah	Salsa	"Sweat (A La La La La Long)" - Inner Circle	6	6	4	16	Eliminated
5	Anni & Erich	Cha-cha-cha	"Saturday Night" - Whigfield	4	4	1	9	Bottom two
6	Ann-Kathrin & Sergiu	Tango	"What's Up?" - 4 Non Blondes	9	9	8	26	Safe
7	Heinrich & Kathrin	Contemporary	"Creep" - Radiohead	9	8	8	25	Safe
8	Maxi & Isabel	Foxtrot	"Lemon Tree" - Fool's Garden	5	6	3	14	Bottom three
9	Vanessa & Christian	Waltz	"Babe" - Take That	8	7	8	23	Safe
10	Cheyenne & Andrzej	Quickstep	"MMMBop" - Hanson	5	5	1	11	Safe
11	Angelina & Massimo	Rumba	"Rush Rush" - Paula Abdul	9	9	5	23	Safe
12	Gil & Ekaterina	Contemporary	"Zombie" - Cover by Jay Brannan	10	10	10	30	Safe

=== Week 4: Boys vs Girls Battle ===
- This week featured a "Boys vs Girls Battle" dance where the male pro dancers and celebrities competed against the female pro dancers and celebrities. Each group received a score which was added to their individual score from the first dance. The Songs of the battle were announced at the end of week 3.

Running order

Order	Couple	Dance	Music	Judge's Scores				Result
Order	Couple	Dance	Music	(Cuba) Gonzalez	(South Africa) Mabuse	(Spain) Llambi	Total	Result
1	Angelina & Massimo	Jive	"Everybody Needs Somebody to Love" - The Blues Brothers	9	9	8	26	Safe
2	Susi & Robert	Samba	"Rockabye" - Clean Bandit ft. Sean Paul & Anne-Marie	7	7	6	20	Bottom two
3	Cheyenne & Andrzej	Contemporary	"Stay" - Shakespears Sister	8	7	5	20	Safe
4	Anni & Erich	Paso doble	"Are You Gonna Go My Way" - Lenny Kravitz	5	5	4	14	Eliminated
5	Maxi & Isabel	Rumba	"Up Where We Belong" - Joe Cocker & Jennifer Warnes	4	4	2	10	Safe
6	Faisal & Oana	Samba	"Schüttel Deinen Speck" - Peter Fox	8	8	6	22	Safe
7	Giovanni & Christina	Jive	"Can't Buy Me Love" - The Beatles	7	7	6	20	Safe
8	Heinrich & Kathrin	Salsa	"I'm Going Bananas" - Madonna	7	7	5	19	Safe
9	Ann-Kathrin & Sergiu	Rumba	"To Make You Feel My Love" - Adele	9	8	7	24	Bottom three
10	Vanessa & Christian	Contemporary	"All of Me" - John Legend	10	10	10	30	Safe
11	Gil & Ekaterina	Argentine tango	"Querer" - Cirque du Soleil	10	10	10	30	Safe
Boys vs Girls Battle
—N/a	Angelina Kirsch; Anni Friesinger-Postma; Ann-Kathrin Brömmel; Cheyenne Pahde; Susi Kentikian; Vanessa Mai	Burlesque	"Big Spender" - Shirley Bassey	7				—N/a
—N/a	Faisal Kawusi; Gil Ofarim; Giovanni Zarrella; Heinrich Popow; Maxi Arland	Hip-Hop	"U Can't Touch This" - MC Hammer	9				—N/a

=== Week 5: Number One Hits ===
- At the end of week 4 professional dancer Isabel Edvardsson announced her pregnancy and therefore won't participate any longer. Sarah Latton was announced as the new partner of Maxi Arland. This show was aired on April 21 because of the Easter holidays.
- Due to an injury of Christina Luft during the dress rehearsal, Giovanni Zarrella will dance with Marta Arndt instead.

Running order

Order	Couple	Dance	Music	Judge's Scores				Result
Order	Couple	Dance	Music	(Cuba) Gonzalez	(South Africa) Mabuse	(Spain) Llambi	Total	Result
1	Vanessa & Christian	Samba	"Shape of You" - Ed Sheeran	9	8	8	25	Safe
2	Susi & Robert	Tango	"Toxic" - Britney Spears	7	6	3	16	Bottom two
3	Ann-Kathrin & Sergiu	Cha-cha-cha	"Tik Tok" - Kesha	7	8	5	20	Eliminated
4	Maxi & Sarah	Jive	"Umbrella - The Baseballs	7	7	5	19	Bottom three
5	Gil & Ekaterina	Cha-cha-cha	"Can't Stop the Feeling" - Justin Timberlake	8	8	5	21	Safe
6	Cheyenne & Andrzej	Paso doble	"Paint It Black" - The Rolling Stones	9	9	8	26	Safe
7	Giovanni & Marta	Contemporary	"The Sound of Silence" - Disturbed	10	10	10	30	Safe
8	Angelina & Massimo	Waltz	"Das Beste" - Silbermond	10	9	9	28	Safe
9	Heinrich & Kathrin	Rumba	"Let Her Go" Passenger	8	9	7	24	Safe
10	Faisal & Oana	Paso doble	"Bad" - Michael Jackson	8	8	6	22	Safe

=== Week 6 ===
Running order

Order	Couple	Dance	Music	Judge's Scores				Result
Order	Couple	Dance	Music	(Cuba) Gonzalez	(South Africa) Mabuse	(Spain) Llambi	Total	Result
1	Cheyenne & Andrzej	Salsa	"Noche De Copas" - Tony Tun Tun	7	8	5	20	Safe
2	Heinrich & Kathrin	Tango	"Für Elise" - District 78	7	7	3	17	Safe
3	Susi & Robert	Foxtrot	"Killer Queen" - Queen	7	5	4	16	Eliminated
4	Angelina & Massimo	Tango	"Tango Flamenco" - Armik	10	10	7	27	Safe
5	Maxi & Sarah	Cha-cha-cha	"Chöre" - Mark Forster	4	4	2	10	Bottom three
6	Gil & Ekaterina	Foxtrot	"Catch and Release" - Matt Simons	9	9	5	23	Safe
7	Faisal & Oana	Salsa	"Don't Touch My Tomatoes" - Josephine Baker	8	9	6	23	Safe
8	Giovanni & Marta	Viennese waltz	"That's Amore" - Dean Martin	6	6	4	16	Bottom two
9	Vanessa & Christian	Paso doble	"El gato montés" - Manuel Penella	10	10	10	30	Safe

=== Week 7: Movie Night ===
Running order

Order	Couple	Dance	Music	Judge's Scores				Result
Order	Couple	Dance	Music	(Cuba) Gonzalez	(South Africa) Mabuse	(Spain) Llambi	Total	Result
1	Maxi & Sarah	Viennese waltz	"You Don't Own Me" - Grace ft. G-Eazy	7	7	8	22	Safe
2	Cheyenne & Andrzej	Foxtrot	"Kiss Me" - Sixpence None the Richer	6	6	5	17	Eliminated
3	Giovanni & Marta	Salsa	"Margarita" - Wilkins	8	9	8	25	Safe
4	Heinrich & Kathrin	Waltz	"Against All Odds (Take a Look at Me Now)" - Phil Collins	6	6	3	15	Bottom three
5	Faisal & Oana	Contemporary	"Sie sieht mich einfach nicht" - Xavier Naidoo	8	7	6	21	Bottom two
6	Vanessa & Christian	Foxtrot	"You've Got a Friend" - Carole King	10	10	10	30	Safe
7	Gil & Ekaterina	Samba	"Hakuna Matata" - Jimmy Cliff & Lebo M	10	9	8	27	Safe
8	Angelina & Massimo	Contemporary	"Who Wants to Live Forever" - Queen	10	10	10	30	Safe
Team Dances
—N/a	Angelina & Massimo; Giovanni & Marta; Gil & Ekaterina; Maxi & Sarah	Freestyle	Medley of Mamma Mia!	7	7	6	20	—N/a
—N/a	Vanessa & Christian; Faisal & Oana; Cheyenne & Andrzej; Heinrich & Kathrin	Freestyle	Medley of Top Gun	7	8	7	22	—N/a

=== Week 8 ===
Running order

Order	Couple	Dance	Music	Judge's Scores				Result
Order	Couple	Dance	Music	(Cuba) Gonzalez	(South Africa) Mabuse	(Spain) Llambi	Total	Result
1	Heinrich & Kathrin	Samba	"Gasolina" - Daddy Yankee	5	5	3	13	Bottom two
2	Faisal & Oana	Waltz	"Amazing Grace"	4	4	1	9	Bottom three
3	Angelina & Massimo	Samba	"Angelina" - Harry Belafonte	9	9	8	26	Safe
4	Maxi & Sarah	Tango	"Tu es foutu" - In-Grid	8	8	7	23	Eliminated
5	Giovanni & Marta	Rumba	"Thinking Out Loud" - Ed Sheeran	8	8	8	24	Safe
6	Gil & Ekaterina	Jive	"Take Good Care of My Baby" - Dick Brave & The Backbeats	10	10	9	29	Safe
7	Vanessa & Christian	Salsa	"Locos Los Dos" - Luis Enrique	10	10	10	30	Safe
Discofox Marathon
—N/a	Gil & Ekaterina; Maxi & Sarah; Faisal & Oana; Angelina & Massimo; Heinrich & Kathrin; Giovanni & Marta; Vanessa & Christian	Disco Marathon		1; 2; 3; 4; 6; 10; 10				—N/a

=== Week 9: Magic Moments ===
- This Week the couples danced a freestyle to a special moment of their lives and a dance duel.

Running order

Order	Couple	Dance	Music	Judge's Scores				Result
Order	Couple	Dance	Music	(Cuba) Gonzalez	(South Africa) Mabuse	(Spain) Llambi	Total	Result
1	Faisal & Oana	Bollywood	"Chaiyya Chaiyya" - Sukhwinder Singh	10	9	7	26	Safe
2	Giovanni & Marta	Rumba/Paso doble/Jazz	"Man in the Mirror" - Michael Jackson	7	7	5	19	Eliminated
3	Angelina & Massimo	Contemporary/Various Ballroom dances	"Beautiful" - Christina Aguilera	9	9	10	28	Safe
4	Heinrich & Kathrin	Contemporary	"The World's Greatest" - R. Kelly	5	5	3	13	Bottom two
5	Vanessa & Christian	Contemporary	"The Voice Within" - Christina Aguilera	10	10	9	29	Safe
6	Gil & Ekaterina	Contemporary	"The Show Must Go On" - Queen	10	10	9	29	Safe
Dance Duels
7	Angelina & Massimo	Charleston	"Pump Up the Jam" - Technotronic	8	7	6	21	—N/a
7	Giovanni & Marta	Charleston	"Pump Up the Jam" - Technotronic	10	10	8	28	—N/a
8	Faisal & Oana	Street	"I Like To Move It" - Reel 2 Real	8	9	7	24	—N/a
8	Heinrich & Kathrin	Street	"I Like To Move It" - Reel 2 Real	8	8	6	22	—N/a
9	Vanessa & Christian	Flamenco	"El Porompompero" - Manolo Escobar	10	10	10	30	—N/a
9	Gil & Ekaterina	Flamenco	"El Porompompero" - Manolo Escobar	10	10	10	30	—N/a

=== Week 10: Fusion Night ===
- This week each couple will perform a non learned dance and the second dance will be a fusion dance to a Schlager song, consisting out of two different dances.
- On May 23 it was announced that Heinrich Popow would withdraw from the competition for health reasons including a tendon rupture in his right shoulder. Owing to the rules of the show, Giovanni Zarrella, who had been eliminated the week before, was reinvited to participate on the show again.

Running order

Order	Couple	Dance	Music	Judge's Scores				Result
Order	Couple	Dance	Music	(Cuba) Gonzalez	(South Africa) Mabuse	(Spain) Llambi	Total	Result
1	Vanessa & Christian	Quickstep (Single Dance)	"Things" - Robbie Williams & Jane Horrocks	10	9	10	29	Safe
1	Vanessa & Christian	Foxtrot & Jive (Fusion Dance)	"Schöner fremder Mann" - Connie Francis	10	10	10	30	Safe
2	Faisal & Oana	Quickstep (Single Dance)	"Meet the Flintstones" - Hoyt Curtin	5	5	2	12	Eliminated
2	Faisal & Oana	Rumba & Viennese waltz (Fusion Dance)	"Ti amo" - Howard Carpendale	4	5	2	11	Eliminated
3	Giovanni & Marta	Samba (Single Dance)	"Despacito" - Luis Fonsi & Daddy Yankee	7	7	5	19	Bottom two
3	Giovanni & Marta	Rumba & Samba (Fusion Dance)	"Die Biene Maja" - Karel Gott	7	7	5	19	Bottom two
4	Angelina & Massimo	Quickstep (Single Dance)	"Männer sind Schweine" - Die Ärzte	9	9	8	26	Safe
4	Angelina & Massimo	Tango & Cha-cha-cha (Fusion Dance)	"Atemlos durch die Nacht" - Helene Fischer	9	9	8	26	Safe
5	Gil & Ekaterina	Viennese waltz (Single Dance)	"Love Is Blindness" - Jack White	9	8	7	24	Safe
5	Gil & Ekaterina	Tango & Jive (Fusion Dance)	"Für mich soll's rote Rosen regnen" - Hildegard Knef	10	10	10	30	Safe

=== Week 11: Semi-Final ===
- For the third time on the show every semi-finalist had to learn three individual dances while the third dance will be an "impro dance" for which the couples got the music only 3 minutes before their performance. They didn't know the dance style and their costumes either. This was the shortest amount of time to prepare.

Running order

Order	Couple	Dance	Music	Judge's Scores				Result
Order	Couple	Dance	Music	(Cuba) Gonzalez	(South Africa) Mabuse	(Spain) Llambi	Total	Result
1	Angelina & Massimo	Salsa	"La Bomba" - Ricky Martin	8	8	6	22	Bottom two
1	Angelina & Massimo	Paso doble	"Scott & Fran's Paso Doble" - David Hirschfelder	7	8	5	20	Bottom two
1	Angelina & Massimo	Jive (Impro Dance)	"Let's Twist Again" - Chubby Checker	9	9	7	25	Bottom two
2	Giovanni & Marta	Quickstep	"It Don't Mean a Thing (If It Ain't Got That Swing)" - Tony Bennett & Lady Gaga	7	7	5	19	Eliminated
2	Giovanni & Marta	Paso doble	"The Puss Suite" - Henry Jackman	9	10	8	27	Eliminated
2	Giovanni & Marta	Viennese waltz (Impro Dance)	"Human" - Christina Perri	9	9	7	25	Eliminated
3	Gil & Ekaterina	Paso doble	"España cañí" - Pascual Marquina Narro	10	10	9	29	Safe
3	Gil & Ekaterina	Rumba	"Love's Divine" - Seal	10	10	9	29	Safe
3	Gil & Ekaterina	Foxtrot (Impro Dance)	"Boys Like You" - Ariana Grande ft. Meghan Trainor	8	8	6	22	Safe
4	Vanessa & Christian	Rumba	"Skinny Love" - Birdy	8	8	7	23	Safe
4	Vanessa & Christian	Tango	"Shout" - Tears for Fears	10	10	10	30	Safe
4	Vanessa & Christian	Samba (Impro Dance)	"Duele el Corazón" - Enrique Iglesias	9	8	8	25	Safe

=== Week 12: Final ===
Running order

Order	Couple	Dance	Music	Judge's Scores				Result
Order	Couple	Dance	Music	(Cuba) Gonzalez	(South Africa) Mabuse	(Spain) Llambi	Total	Result
1	Angelina & Massimo	Cha-cha-cha	"Hot 2 Touch" - Felix Jaehn, Hight and Alex Aiono	8	8	7	23	Third place
1	Angelina & Massimo	Contemporary	"Who Wants to Live Forever" - Queen	10	10	10	30	Third place
1	Angelina & Massimo	Freestyle	Medley of Amélie	9	10	9	28	Third place
2	Vanessa & Christian	Waltz	"No Woman, No Cry" - Bob Marley	9	9	9	27	Runner-Up
2	Vanessa & Christian	Cha-cha-cha	"Don't Be So Shy" - Imany	10	10	10	30	Runner-Up
2	Vanessa & Christian	Freestyle	Medley of Zorro	10	10	10	30	Runner-Up
3	Gil & Ekaterina	Cha-cha-cha	"You Don't Know Me" - Jax Jones	9	10	10	29	Winner
3	Gil & Ekaterina	Argentine tango	"Querer" - Cirque du Soleil	10	10	10	30	Winner
3	Gil & Ekaterina	Freestyle	Medley of Avatar	10	10	9	29	Winner

Encore performances by the eliminated couples

Order	Couple (Note: On his Instagram Account Heinrich Popow announced that due to his injury he was unable to dance) (Note: Jörg Draeger danced with Christina Luft)	Dance	Music
1	Jörg & Christina	Cha-cha-cha	"Marmor, Stein und Eisen bricht" - Drafi Deutscher
2	Chiara & Vadim	Waltz	"Hero" - Mariah Carey
3	Bastiaan & Sarah	Salsa	"Sweat (A La La La La Long)" - Inner Circle
4	Anni & Erich	Paso doble	"Are You Gonna Go My Way" - Lenny Kravitz
5	Ann-Kathrin & Sergiu	Tango	"What's Up?" - 4 Non Blondes
6	Susi & Robert	Cha-cha-cha	"Fame" - Irene Cara
7	Cheyenne & Andrzej	Viennese waltz	"Love on the Brain" - Rihanna
8	Maxi & Sarah	Tango	"Tu es foutu" - In-Grid
9	Faisal & Oana	Samba	"Schüttel Deinen Speck" - Peter Fox
10	Giovanni & Marta	Contemporary	"The Sound of Silence" - Disturbed

== Dance chart ==
Highest scoring dance
Lowest scoring dance
Did not scored (encore performance in the finale)
The pair did not perform this week
Withdrew from the competition

Couple	1		2	3	4		5	6	7		8		9		10		11			12		
Gil & Ekaterina	Quickstep	Quickstep	Salsa	Contemporary	Argentine tango	Hip-Hop	Cha-cha-cha	Foxtrot	Samba	Freestyle	Jive	Disco Marathon	Freestyle	Flamenco	Viennese waltz	Tango; Jive	Paso doble	Rumba	Foxtrot	Cha-cha-cha	Argentine tango	Freestyle
Vanessa & Christian	Cha-cha-cha	Cha-cha-cha	Jive	Waltz	Contemporary	Burlesque	Samba	Paso doble	Foxtrot	Freestyle	Salsa	Disco Marathon	Freestyle	Flamenco	Quickstep	Foxtrot; Jive	Rumba	Tango	Samba	Waltz	Cha-cha-cha	Freestyle
Angelina & Massimo	Cha-cha-cha	Cha-cha-cha	Foxtrot	Rumba	Jive	Burlesque	Waltz	Tango	Contemporary	Freestyle	Samba	Disco Marathon	Freestyle	Charleston	Quickstep	Tango; Cha-cha-cha	Salsa	Paso doble	Jive	Cha-cha-cha	Contemporary	Freestyle
Giovanni & Marta/Christina	-	Cha-cha-cha	Foxtrot	Argentine tango	Jive	Hip-Hop	Contemporary	Viennese waltz	Salsa	Freestyle	Rumba	Disco Marathon	Freestyle	Charleston	Samba	Rumba; Samba	Quickstep	Paso doble	Viennese waltz			Contemporary
Faisal & Oana	Cha-cha-cha	Cha-cha-cha	Tango	Rumba	Samba	Hip-Hop	Paso doble	Salsa	Contemporary	Freestyle	Waltz	Disco Marathon	Freestyle	Street	Quickstep	Rumba; Viennese waltz						Samba
Heinrich & Kathrin	Cha-cha-cha	Cha-cha-cha	Foxtrot	Contemporary	Salsa	Hip-Hop	Rumba	Tango	Waltz	Freestyle	Samba	Disco Marathon	Freestyle	Street								
Maximilian & Sarah/Isabel	Quickstep	Quickstep	Salsa	Foxtrot	Rumba	Hip-Hop	Jive	Cha-cha-cha	Viennese waltz	Freestyle	Tango	Disco Marathon										Tango
Cheyenne & Andrzej	Waltz	Viennese waltz	Cha-cha-cha	Quickstep	Contemporary	Burlesque	Paso doble	Salsa	Foxtrot	Freestyle												Viennese waltz
Susi & Robert	Cha-cha-cha	Cha-cha-cha	Rumba	Quickstep	Samba	Burlesque	Tango	Foxtrot														Cha-cha-cha
Ann-Kathrin & Sergiu	Waltz	Waltz	Jive	Tango	Rumba	Burlesque	Cha-cha-cha															Tango
Anni & Erich	Waltz	Viennese waltz	Tango	Cha-cha-cha	Paso doble	Burlesque																Paso doble
Bastiaan & Sarah	Quickstep	-	Rumba	Salsa																		Salsa
Chiara & Vadim	Waltz	Waltz	Cha-cha-cha																			Waltz
Jörg & Marta	Cha-cha-cha	Cha-cha-cha																				Cha-cha-cha
