= Let's Dance (German TV series) season 11 =

Let's Dance
- Season 11
- Celebrity winner: Ingolf Lück
- Professional winner: Ekaterina Leonova
- No. of episodes: 13

Release
- Original network: RTL Television
- Original release: March 9 (launch); March 16, 2018 – June 8, 2018

Season chronology
- ← Previous; Season 10 Next → Season 12

The eleventh season of Let's Dance started on March 9, 2018. Daniel Hartwich returned as host but Sylvie Meis was replaced by Victoria Swarovski who won Let's Dance in 2016. Motsi Mabuse, Joachim Llambi and Jorge González also returned as the judges.

== Couples ==
Celebrity	Notability (known for)	Professional partner	Status
Tina Ruland	Actress	Vadim Garbuzov	Eliminated 1st on March 17, 2018
Jessica Paszka	Reality TV star	Robert Beitsch	Eliminated 2nd on March 24, 2018
Heiko Lochmann	Musician	Kathrin Menzinger	Eliminated 3rd on April 6, 2018
Chakall	Chef	Marta Arndt	Eliminated 4th on April 13, 2018
Jimi Blue Ochsenknecht	Actor	Renata Lusin	Withdrew on April 24, 2018
Charlotte Würdig	Actress	Valentin Lusin	Eliminated 6th on April 27, 2018
Roman Lochmann	Musician	Katja Kalugina	Eliminated 7th on May 4, 2018
Bela Klentze	Actor	Oana Nechiti; Marta Arndt (Week 6)	Withdrew on May 15, 2018
Thomas Hermanns	Television presenter	Regina Luca	Eliminated 9th on May 18, 2018
Iris Mareike Steen	Actress	Christian Polanc	Eliminated 8th & 10th on May 25, 2018
Julia Dietze	Actress	Massimo Sinató	Eliminated 11th on June 1, 2018
Barbara Meier	Fashion model	Sergiu Luca	Third place on June 8, 2018
Judith Williams	Singer	Erich Klann	Runner-Up on June 8, 2018
Ingolf Lück	Actor	Ekaterina Leonova	Winner on June 8, 2018

== Scoring chart ==
Couple	Place	1		2	3	4			5	6	7			8			9			10			11 Semi-Finals				12 Finals			
Couple	Place	(Note: Score from the launch show)	(Note: Score from the first live show)	2	3	(Note: Score from the first dance)	(Note: Score from the 'Boys vs Girls' battle)	Σ	5	6	(Note: Score from the first dance)	(Note: Score from the Team Dance)	Σ	(Note: Score from the first dance)	(Note: Score from the Discofox Marathon)	Σ	(Note: Score from the Magic Moment freestyle)	(Note: Score from the Dance duel)	Σ	(Note: Score from the first dance)	(Note: Score from the Fusion Dance)	Σ	(Note: Score from the first dance)	(Note: Score from the second dance)	(Note: Score from the Impro dance)	Σ	(Note: Score from the first dance)	(Note: Score from the second dance)	(Note: Score from the Freestyle)	Σ
Ingolf & Ekaterina	1	18	25	29	19	23	+7	30	17	22	18	18	36	29	+2	31	21	28	49	22	30	52	25	20	21	66	29	30	30	89
Judith & Erich	2	21	24	26	20	25	+8	33	18	29	30	25	55	23	+8	31	25	27	52	28	28	56	28	23	25	76	27	30	30	87
Barbara & Sergiu	3	17	20	17	26	— (Note: Barbara was given by due to a death in her family)			25	24	30	25	55	25	+6	31	27	29	56	24	22	46	22	27	27	76	24	30	24	78
Julia & Massimo	4	15	21	26	25	24	+8	32	30	28	25	18	43	30	+4	34	30	29	59	30	25	55	27	30	27	84				
Iris Mareike & Christian	5	13	15	10	15	17	+8	25	12	13	12	18	30	17	+3	20	20	20	40	17	20	37								
Thomas & Regina	6	19	23	27	21	28	+7	35	29	29	22	25	47	20	+10	30	21	26	47											
Bela & Oana	7	13	12	13	16	20	+7	27	23	19	23	25	48	17	+1	18	-													
Roman & Katja	8	10	15	13	22	28	+7	35	12	18	17	18	35																	
Charlotte & Valentin	9	18	24	19	25	24	+8	32	26	22																				
Jimi Blue & Renata	10	14	16	26	21	28	+7	35	24	−																				
Chakall & Marta	11	6	7	10	7	12	+7	19																						
Heiko & Kathrin	12	12	12	20	19																									
Jessica & Robert	13	14	14	16																										
Tina & Vadim	14	12	14																											

Red numbers indicates the lowest score for each week.
Green numbers indicates the highest score for each week.
indicates the couple eliminated that week.
indicates the returning couple that finished in the bottom two.
indicates the couple which was immune from elimination.
indicates the couple that withdrew from the competition.
indicates the couple was eliminated but later returned to the competition.
indicates the winning couple.
indicates the runner-up couple.
indicates the third-place couple.

=== Averages ===
This table only counts for dances scored on a traditional 30-points scale.

Rank by average	Place	Couple	Total	Dances	Average
1	4	Julia & Massimo	440	17	25.9
2	2	Judith & Erich	512	20	25.6
3	3	Barbara & Sergiu	465	19	24.5
4	6	Thomas & Regina	290	12	24.2
5	1	Ingolf & Ekaterina	474	20	23.7
6	9	Charlotte & Valentin	158	7	22.6
7	10	Jimi Blue & Renata	129	6	21.5
8	7	Bela & Oana	181	10	18.1
9	8	Roman & Katja	153	9	17.0
10	12	Heiko & Kathrin	63	4	15.8
11	5	Iris Mareike & Christian	219	14	15.6
12	13	Jessica & Robert	44	3	14.7
13	14	Tina & Vadim	26	2	13.0
14	11	Chakall & Marta	42	5	8.4

=== Highest and lowest scoring performances ===
The best and worst performances in each dance according to the judges' marks are as follows:

Dance	Best dancer(s)	Best score	Worst dancer(s)	Worst score
Cha-cha-cha	Thomas Hermanns	27	Chakall	6
Quickstep	Ingolf Lück	29	Jimi Blue Ochsenknecht	14
Waltz	Barbara Meier	30	Iris Mareike Steen	13
Viennese waltz	Julia Dietze	28	Bela Klentze; Chakall	12
Rumba	Ingolf Lück	29	Chakall	10
Jive	Thomas Hermanns	29	Chakall	7
Foxtrot	Julia Dietze	30	Roman Lochmann	13
Salsa	Judith Williams	27	Iris Mareike Steen	17
Tango	Ingolf Lück	30	Iris Mareike Steen; Roman Lochmann	17
Argentine tango	Julia Dietze	30	Barbara Meier	24
Contemporary	Julia Dietze	30	Iris Mareike Steen	15
Samba	Julia Dietze	27	Bela Klentze	19
Paso doble	Judith Williams; Julia Dietze	30	Iris Mareike Steen	10
Team Dance	Barbara Meier; Bela Klentze; Judith Williams; Thomas Hermanns	25	Ingolf Lück; Iris Mareike Steen; Julia Dietze; Roman Lochmann	18
Discofox Marathon	Thomas Hermanns	10	Bela Klentze	1
Freestyle (Magic Moment)	Julia Dietze	30	Iris Mareike Steen	20
Bollywood	Barbara Meier	29	Judith Williams	27
Charleston	Ingolf Lück	28	Thomas Hermanns	26
Street	Julia Dietze	29	Iris Mareike Steen	20
Fusion dance	Ingolf Lück	30	Iris Mareike Steen	20
Freestyle (Finale)	Ingolf Lück; Judith Williams	30	Barbara Meier	24

=== Couples' Highest and lowest scoring performances ===
According to the traditional 30-point scale.

Couples	Highest Scoring Dances	Score	Lowest Scoring Dances	Score
Ingolf & Ekaterina	Fusion dance, Tango & Freestyle	30	Quickstep	17
Judith & Erich	Paso doble (twice) & Freestyle	30	Salsa	18
Barbara & Sergiu	Waltz (twice)	30	Quickstep, Rumba	17
Julia & Massimo	Argentine tango, Contemporary, Freestyle, Foxtrot & Paso doble	30	Cha-cha-cha	15
Iris & Christian	Freestyle, Street & Fusion dance	20	Paso doble	10
Thomas & Regina	Jive & Foxtrot	29	Quickstep	19
Bela & Oana	Foxtrot & Paso doble	23	Viennese waltz	12
Roman & Katja	Contemporary	28	Cha-cha-cha	10
Charlotte & Valentin	Samba	26	Waltz	18
Jimi Blue & Renata	Tango	28	Quickstep	14
Chakall & Marta	Viennese waltz	12	Cha-cha-cha	6
Heiko & Kathrin	Quickstep	20	Cha-cha-cha	12
Jessica & Robert	Foxtrot	16	Cha-cha-cha	14
Tina & Vadim	Cha-cha-cha	14	Cha-cha-cha	12

== Weekly scores and songs ==
=== Launch show ===
For the second time there was a launch show in which each celebrity meets his partner. This show will be aired on 9 March 2018. In this first live show the couples then danced in groups and each couple got points by the judges and the viewers. At the end of the show the couple with the highest combined points was granted immunity from the first elimination. Judith Williams won immunity from the first elimination.

The Team dances

Order	Couple	Dance	Music	Judge's Scores				Result
Order	Couple	Dance	Music	(Cuba) Gonzalez	(South Africa) Mabuse	(Spain) Llambi	Total	Result
1	Jessica Paszka	Cha-cha-cha	"Ain't Your Mama" - Jennifer Lopez	5	5	4	14	−
1	Julia Dietze	Cha-cha-cha	"Ain't Your Mama" - Jennifer Lopez	5	5	5	15	−
1	Tina Ruland	Cha-cha-cha	"Ain't Your Mama" - Jennifer Lopez	4	4	4	12	−
2	Barbara Meier	Quickstep	"I Want You to Want Me" - Cheap Trick	6	6	5	17	−
2	Jimi Blue Ochsenknecht	Quickstep	"I Want You to Want Me" - Cheap Trick	5	5	4	14	−
2	Thomas Hermanns	Quickstep	"I Want You to Want Me" - Cheap Trick	6	6	7	19	−
3	Charlotte Würdig	Waltz	"You Light Up My Life" - Whitney Houston	6	6	6	18	−
3	Iris Mareike Steen	Waltz	"You Light Up My Life" - Whitney Houston	5	5	3	13	−
3	Judith Williams	Waltz	"You Light Up My Life" - Whitney Houston	7	7	7	21	Immunity
4	Bela Klentze	Viennese waltz	"We Are the Champions" - Queen	5	6	2	13	−
4	Ingolf Lück	Viennese waltz	"We Are the Champions" - Queen	6	7	5	18	−
5	Chakall	Cha-cha-cha	"A Little Party Never Killed Nobody (All We Got)" - Fergie	2	3	1	6	−
5	Heiko Lochmann	Cha-cha-cha	"A Little Party Never Killed Nobody (All We Got)" - Fergie	4	5	3	12	−
5	Roman Lochmann	Cha-cha-cha	"A Little Party Never Killed Nobody (All We Got)" - Fergie	3	4	3	10	−

=== Week 1 ===
- Judith Williams was immune from elimination after earning it in the launch show.
- Each couple reprised the dance the celebrity danced during the launch show.

Running order

Order	Couple	Dance	Music	Judge's Scores				Result
Order	Couple	Dance	Music	(Cuba) Gonzalez	(South Africa) Mabuse	(Spain) Llambi	Total	Result
1	Jessica & Robert	Cha-cha-cha	"Timber" - Pitbull ft. Kesha	5	5	4	14	Safe
2	Tina & Vadim	Cha-cha-cha	"Physical" - Olivia Newton-John	5	5	4	14	Eliminated
3	Barbara & Sergiu	Quickstep	"You're the One That I Want" - John Travolta & Olivia Newton-John	7	7	6	20	Safe
4	Heiko & Kathrin	Cha-cha-cha	"Don't Worry" - Madcon	4	5	3	12	Bottom two
5	Iris & Christian	Waltz	"Sweet Child O'Mine" - Guns N' Roses	6	6	3	15	Safe
6	Jimi Blue & Renata	Quickstep	"Freedom! '90" - George Michael	6	6	4	16	Safe
7	Charlotte & Valentin	Waltz	"A Moment Like This" - Kelly Clarkson	8	8	8	24	Safe
8	Chakall & Marta	Cha-cha-cha	"Suavemente" - Elvis Crespo	3	3	1	7	Bottom three
9	Bela & Oana	Viennese waltz	"Perfect" - Ed Sheeran	5	5	2	12	Safe
10	Julia & Massimo	Cha-cha-cha	"Be Mine" - Ofenbach	6	7	8	21	Safe
11	Thomas & Regina	Quickstep	"I'm So Excited" - The Pointer Sisters	8	8	7	23	Safe
12	Roman & Katja	Cha-cha-cha	"There's Nothing Holdin' Me Back" - Shawn Mendes	5	6	4	15	Safe
13	Ingolf & Ekaterina	Viennese waltz	"Piano Man" - Billy Joel	9	8	8	25	Safe
14	Judith & Erich	Waltz	"She" - Elvis Costello	8	9	7	24	Immune

=== Week 2: 80's ===
Running order

Order	Couple	Dance	Music	Judge's Scores				Result
Order	Couple	Dance	Music	(Cuba) Gonzalez	(South Africa) Mabuse	(Spain) Llambi	Total	Result
1	Charlotte & Valentin	Cha-cha-cha	"Everlasting Love" - Sandra	6	7	6	19	Safe
2	Roman & Katja	Foxtrot	"Zu Spät" - Die Ärzte	5	5	3	13	Safe
3	Bela & Oana	Jive	"I'm Still Standing" - Elton John	5	5	3	13	Safe
4	Jimi Blue & Renata	Paso doble	"Another One Bites the Dust" - Queen	9	9	8	26	Safe
5	Jessica & Robert	Foxtrot	"Like a Virgin" - Madonna	6	6	4	16	Eliminated
6	Thomas & Regina	Cha-cha-cha	"Hands Up (Give Me Your Heart)" - Ottawan	9	9	9	27	Safe
7	Iris & Christian	Paso doble	"Burning Heart" - Survivor	4	4	2	10	Bottom three
8	Barbara & Sergiu	Rumba	"Sign Your Name" - Terence Trent D'Arby	6	6	5	17	Safe
9	Chakall & Marta	Rumba	"I Just Called to Say I Love You" - Stevie Wonder	4	4	2	10	Bottom two
10	Judith & Erich	Cha-cha-cha	"Flashdance... What a Feeling" - Irene Cara	9	9	8	26	Safe
11	Heiko & Kathrin	Quickstep	"Hurra, hurra, die Schule brennt" - Extrabreit	7	8	5	20	Safe
12	Julia & Massimo	Rumba	"Purple Rain" - Prince	9	8	9	26	Safe
13	Ingolf & Ekaterina	Tango	"Somebody's Watching Me" - Rockwell	10	10	9	29	Safe

=== Week 3 ===
- The show was aired on April 6 because of the Easter holidays.

Running order

Order	Couple	Dance	Music	Judge's Scores				Result
Order	Couple	Dance	Music	(Cuba) Gonzalez	(South Africa) Mabuse	(Spain) Llambi	Total	Result
1	Bela & Oana	Cha-cha-cha	"Katchi" - Ofenbach	6	6	4	16	Safe
2	Barbara & Sergiu	Paso doble	"O Fortuna" - from Carmina Burana	9	9	8	26	Safe
3	Jimi Blue & Renata	Salsa	"Maria" - Santana feat. The Product G&B	7	8	6	21	Safe
4	Chakall & Marta	Jive	"I'm a Believer" - The Monkees	3	3	1	7	Bottom two
5	Charlotte & Valentin	Tango	"Because the Night" - Patti Smith	9	9	7	25	Safe
6	Thomas & Regina	Viennese waltz	"I Got You Babe" - Sonny & Cher	8	7	6	21	Safe
7	Roman & Katja	Jive	"Ab in den Süden" - Buddy	8	8	6	22	Safe
8	Iris & Christian	Contemporary	"Only You" - Selena Gomez	6	5	4	15	Bottom three
9	Ingolf & Ekaterina	Cha-cha-cha	"Da Ya Think I'm Sexy?" - Rod Stewart	7	7	5	19	Safe
10	Julia & Massimo	Quickstep	"I Walk the Line" - Johnny Cash	9	8	8	25	Safe
11	Heiko & Kathrin	Salsa	"Señorita" - Kay One & Pietro Lombardi	7	7	5	19	Eliminated
12	Judith & Erich	Rumba	"Every Breath You Take" - The Police	7	7	6	20	Safe

=== Week 4: 90's ===
- Due to a death in her family, Barbara didn't perform that week

Running order

Order	Couple	Dance	Music	Judge's Scores				Result
Order	Couple	Dance	Music	(Cuba) Gonzalez	(South Africa) Mabuse	(Spain) Llambi	Total	Result
1	Julia & Massimo	Salsa	"Bailamos" - Enrique Iglesias	9	8	7	24	Safe
2	Iris & Christian	Tango	"Go West" - Pet Shop Boys	7	6	4	17	Bottom three
3	Thomas & Regina	Rumba	"Save the Best for Last" - Vanessa Williams	9	9	10	28	Safe
4	Jimi Blue & Renata	Tango	"Insomnia" - Faithless	10	10	8	28	Safe
5	Judith & Erich	Quickstep	"All That She Wants" - Ace of Base	9	8	8	25	Safe
6	Roman & Katja	Contemporary	"As Long as You Love Me" - Backstreet Boys	10	10	8	28	Safe
7	Chakall & Marta	Viennese waltz	"Have You Ever Really Loved a Woman" - Bryan Adams	4	6	2	12	Eliminated
8	Charlotte & Valentin	Jive	"Alles nur geklaut" - Die Prinzen	9	8	7	24	Bottom two
9	Bela & Oana	Rumba	"You" - Ten Sharp	8	7	5	20	Safe
10	Ingolf & Ekaterina	Contemporary	"Out of the Dark" - Falco	8	8	7	23	Safe
—	Barbara & Sergiu	Given by						
Boys vs Girls Battle
—	Julia Dietze; Iris Mareike Steen; Judith Williams; Charlotte Würdig	Freestyle	"Ich find' dich scheiße" - Tic Tac Toe	8				—
—	Thomas Hermanns; Jimi Blue Ochsenknecht; Roman Lochmann; Chakall; Bela Klentze; Ingolf Lück	Freestyle	"Mr. Boombastic" - Shaggy	7				—

=== Week 5: 2000's ===
Running order

Order	Couple	Dance	Music	Judge's Scores				Result
Order	Couple	Dance	Music	(Cuba) Gonzalez	(South Africa) Mabuse	(Spain) Llambi	Total	Result
1	Iris & Christian	Cha-cha-cha	"I'm Outta Love" - Anastacia	5	5	2	12	Safe
2	Ingolf & Ekaterina	Quickstep	"Country Roads" - Hermes House Band	7	7	3	17	Bottom two
3	Bela & Oana	Foxtrot	"Wire to Wire" - Razor Light	9	8	7	23	Safe
4	Charlotte & Valentin	Samba	"La tortura" - Shakira feat. Alejandro Sanz	9	9	8	26	Safe
5	Barbara & Sergiu	Cha-cha-cha	"Daylight in Your Eyes" - No Angels	9	8	8	25	Eliminated
6	Roman & Katja	Paso doble	"Bring Me to Life" - Evanescence	5	5	2	12	Bottom three
7	Judith & Erich	Salsa	"Aguanilé" - Marc Anthony	7	7	4	18	Safe
8	Jimi Blue & Renata	Rumba	"Weinst Du" - Echt	8	8	8	24	Safe
9	Thomas & Regina	Jive	"Shake It" - Metro Station	10	10	9	29	Safe
10	Julia & Massimo	Argentine tango	"Tainted Love" - Marilyn Manson	10	10	10	30	Safe

=== Week 6 ===
- Jimi Blue Ochsenknecht had to withdraw from the show because he broke his foot. Barbara Meier returned after being eliminated.
- Bela Klentze had to dance with Marta Arndt this week because Oana Nechiti was injured.

Running order

Order	Couple	Dance	Music	Judge's Scores				Result
Order	Couple	Dance	Music	(Cuba) Gonzalez	(South Africa) Mabuse	(Spain) Llambi	Total	Result
1	Ingolf & Ekaterina	Jive	"Dance with Somebody" - Mando Diao	8	8	6	22	Safe
2	Roman & Katja	Viennese waltz	"To Know Him Is to Love Him" (Cover) - Amy Winehouse	7	8	3	18	Bottom two
3	Thomas & Regina	Foxtrot	"New York, New York" - Frank Sinatra	10	10	9	29	Safe
4	Charlotte & Valentin	Rumba	"I Only Want to Be with You" (Cover) - Vonda Shepard	8	7	7	22	Eliminated
5	Bela & Marta	Samba	"Mas que nada" - Sérgio Mendes & Brasil ’66	7	7	5	19	Safe
6	Iris & Christian	Jive	"Dear Future Husband" - Meghan Trainor	5	5	3	13	Bottom three
7	Barbara & Sergiu	Tango	"Objection" - Shakira	8	8	8	24	Safe
8	Judith & Erich	Contemporary	"Every Little Thing She Does Is Magic" (Cover) - Sleeping at Last	10	10	9	29	Safe
9	Julia & Massimo	Viennese waltz	"Love Hurts" (Cover) - Nazareth	10	9	9	28	Safe

=== Week 7: TV Melodies ===
Running order

Order	Couple	Dance	Music	Judge's Scores				Result
Order	Couple	Dance	Music	(Cuba) Gonzalez	(South Africa) Mabuse	(Spain) Llambi	Total	Result
1	Julia & Massimo	Jive	Do You Love Me (from Dirty Dancing) - The Contours	8	8	9	25	Bottom three
2	Roman & Katja	Tango	La cumparsita (from Some Like It Hot) - Gerardo Matos Rodríguez	7	7	3	17	Eliminated
3	Iris & Christian	Rumba	Another Love (from Deutsche Telekom ad 2013) - Tom Odell	5	5	2	12	Bottom two
4	Ingolf & Ekaterina	Salsa	Cuban Pete (from The Mask) - Jim Carrey	6	7	5	18	Safe
5	Barbara & Sergiu	Waltz	My Love (from The Twilight Saga: Eclipse) - Sia	10	10	10	30	Safe
6	Bela & Oana	Paso doble	Heavy Cross (from Dior ad 2011) - Gossip	8	8	7	23	Safe
7	Thomas & Regina	Contemporary	The Winner Takes It All (from Mamma Mia!) - ABBA	7	7	8	22	Safe
8	Judith & Erich	Paso doble	Habanera (from Carmen) - Georges Bizet	10	10	10	30	Safe
Team Dances
—	Team Surprise	Cha-cha-cha (all), Rumba (Julia & Massimo), Samba (Ingolf & Ekaterina), Foxtrot (Roman & Katja), Tango (Iris & Christian), Jive (all)	French Medley; Joe le taxi - Vanessa Paradis • Je t'aime... moi non plus - Jane Birkin & Serge Gainsbourg • Moi... Lolita - Alizée • Les Champs-Élysées - Joe Dassin • Non, je ne regrette rien - Édith Piaf • Je veux - Zaz	7	6	5	18	—
—	Team Famiglia	Cha-cha-cha (all), Rumba (Thomas & Regina), Quickstep (Judith & Erich), Samba (Bela & Oana), Tango (Barbara & Sergiu), Viennese waltz (all)	Italian Medley; Gloria - Umberto Tozzi • Senza una donna - Zucchero & Paul Young • Azzurro - Adriano Celentano • Perdono - Tiziano Ferro • Bello e impossibile - Gianna Nannini • Se bastasse una canzone - Eros Ramazzotti	8	9	8	25	—

=== Week 8: Discofox ===
Running order

Order	Couple	Dance	Music	Judge's Scores				Result
Order	Couple	Dance	Music	(Cuba) Gonzalez	(South Africa) Mabuse	(Spain) Llambi	Total	Result
1	Barbara & Sergiu	Samba	Copacabana - Barry Manilow	8	8	9	25	Safe
2	Bela & Oana	Quickstep	When I Find Love Again	7	7	3	17	Bottom two
3	Ingolf & Ekaterina	Rumba		10	10	9	29	Safe
4	Judith & Erich	Foxtrot	Beyond the Sea	8	8	7	23	Safe
5	Thomas & Regina	Samba		7	7	6	20	Bottom three
6	Iris & Christian	Salsa		6	6	5	17	Eliminated
7	Julia & Massimo	Contemporary		10	10	10	30	Safe
Discofox Marathon
—	Bela & Oana	Discofox Marathon		1				—
—	Ingolf & Ekaterina	Discofox Marathon		2				—
—	Iris & Christian	Discofox Marathon		3				—
—	Julia & Massimo	Discofox Marathon		4				—
—	Barbara & Sergiu	Discofox Marathon		6				—
—	Judith & Erich	Discofox Marathon		8				—
—	Thomas & Regina	Discofox Marathon		10				—

=== Week 9: Magic Moments ===
- Bela Klentze had to withdraw from the show because of his knee's injury. Iris Mareike Steen returned after being eliminated.

Running order

Order	Couple	Dance	Music	Judge's Scores				Result
Order	Couple	Dance	Music	(Cuba) Gonzalez	(South Africa) Mabuse	(Spain) Llambi	Total	Result
1	Thomas & Regina feat. Robert Beitsch	Freestyle (Samba & Rumba)	Love Is in the Air - John Paul Young	7	8	6	21	Eliminated
2	Barbara & Sergiu	Freestyle (Foxtrot & Rumba & Paso doble)	Ich war noch niemals in New York - Udo Jürgens & Empire State of Mind - Jay-Z feat. Alicia Keys	9	9	9	27	Bottom three
3	Ingolf & Ekaterina	Freestyle (Contemporary & Tango & Rumba)	Mother's Jounrney - Yann Tiersen	8	7	6	21	safe
4	Iris Mareike & Christian	Freestyle	All this time - Maria Mena	7	7	6	20	Bottom two
5	Judith & Erich	Freestyle	Music - John Miles	9	9	7	25	safe
6	Julia & Massimo	Freestyle	Knockin' on Heaven's Door - Bob Dylan	10	10	10	30	safe
Dance Duels
7	Thomas & Regina	Charleston	Girls Girls Girls	9	9	8	26	—
7	Ingolf & Ekaterina	Charleston	Girls Girls Girls	10	9	9	28	—
8	Julia & Massimo	Street	Push it	10	10	9	29	—
8	Iris Mareike & Christian	Street	Push it	7	7	6	20	—
9	Judith & Erich	Bollywood		10	9	8	27	—
9	Barbara & Sergiu	Bollywood		10	10	9	29	—

=== Week 10: Flower Power Fusion ===
Running order

Order	Couple	Dance	Music	Judge's Scores				Result
Order	Couple	Dance	Music	(Cuba) Gonzalez	(South Africa) Mabuse	(Spain) Llambi	Total	Result
1	Judith & Erich	Jive	Proud Mary - Tina Turner	10	9	9	28	Safe
1	Judith & Erich	Rumba & Foxtrot Fusion		10	9	9	28	Safe
2	Ingolf & Ekaterina	Foxtrot	Always Look on the Bright Side of Life - Monty Python	8	8	6	22	Safe
2	Ingolf & Ekaterina	Tango & Rumba Fusion		10	10	10	30	Safe
3	Barbara & Sergiu	Contemporary	Halo - Beyoncé	8	8	8	24	Bottom Two
3	Barbara & Sergiu	Quickstep & Samba Fusion	These Boots Are Made for Walkin' - Nancy Sinatra	8	7	7	22	Bottom Two
4	Julia & Massimo	Foxtrot	I Just Want to Make Love to You - Etta James	10	10	10	30	Safe
4	Julia & Massimo	Rumba & Quickstep Fusion	Son of a Preacher Man - Dusty Springfield	9	8	8	25	Safe
5	Iris Mareike & Christian	Quickstep		6	6	5	17	Eliminated
5	Iris Mareike & Christian	Cha-cha-cha & Tango Fusion	Light my Fire	7	7	6	20	Eliminated

=== Week 11: Semifinal ===
Running order

Order	Couple	Dance	Music	Judge's Scores				Result
Order	Couple	Dance	Music	(Cuba) Gonzalez	(South Africa) Mabuse	(Spain) Llambi	Total	Result
1	Barbara & Sergiu	Jive	"Let's Have a Party" - Wanda Jackson	8	7	7	22	Bottom two
1	Barbara & Sergiu	Foxtrot	"Lovefool" - The Cardigans	9	9	9	27	Bottom two
1	Barbara & Sergiu	Impro Rumba	"Sacrifice" - Elton John	9	9	9	27	Bottom two
2	Judith & Erich	Tango	"Libertango" - Astor Piazzolla	10	10	8	28	Safe
2	Judith & Erich	Samba	"Échame la Culpa" - Luis Fonsi and Demi Lovato	8	8	7	23	Safe
2	Judith & Erich	Impro Cha-cha-cha		9	9	7	25	Safe
3	Ingolf & Ekaterina	Paso doble	"Plaza of Execution" - James Horner	9	8	8	25	Safe
3	Ingolf & Ekaterina	Samba	"Bem, Bem Maria" - Gipsy Kings	7	7	6	20	Safe
3	Ingolf & Ekaterina	Impro Quickstep	Mr. Sandman	7	8	6	21	Safe
4	Julia & Massimo	Samba	"Mi Gente" - J Balvin featuring Willy William	9	9	9	27	Eliminated
4	Julia & Massimo	Paso doble	"Don't Let Me Be Misunderstood" - The Animals	10	10	10	30	Eliminated
4	Julia & Massimo	Impro Viennese waltz		9	9	9	27	Eliminated

=== Week 12: Final ===
Running order

Order	Couple	Dance	Music	Judge's Scores				Result
Order	Couple	Dance	Music	Jury 1	Jury 2	Jury 3	Total	Result
1	Barbara & Sergiu	Salsa		8	8	8	24	Third place
1	Barbara & Sergiu	Waltz		10	10	10	30	Third place
1	Barbara & Sergiu	Freestyle		8	8	8	24	Third place
2	Judith & Erich	Salsa		9	9	9	27	Runner-Up
2	Judith & Erich	Paso doble		10	10	10	30	Runner-Up
2	Judith & Erich	Freestyle		10	10	10	30	Runner-Up
3	Ingolf & Ekaterina	Quickstep		10	10	9	29	Winner
3	Ingolf & Ekaterina	Tango		10	10	10	30	Winner
3	Ingolf & Ekaterina	Freestyle		10	10	10	30	Winner

== Dance chart ==
Highest scoring dance
Lowest scoring dance
Did not scored (encore performance in the finale)
The pair did not perform this week
Withdrew from the competition

Couple	1		2	3	4		5	6	7		8		9		10		11			12		
Ingolf & Ekaterina	Viennese waltz	Viennese waltz	Tango	Cha-cha-cha	Contemporary	Freestyle	Quickstep	Jive	Salsa	Team Dance	Rumba	Discofox	Freestyle	Charleston	Foxtrot	Fusion Dance	Paso doble	Samba	Quickstep	Quickstep	Tango	Freestyle
Judith & Erich	Waltz	Waltz	Cha-cha-cha	Rumba	Quickstep	Freestyle	Salsa	Contemporary	Paso doble	Team Dance	Foxtrot	Discofox	Freestyle	Bollywood	Jive	Fusion Dance	Tango	Samba	Cha-cha-cha	Salsa	Paso doble	Freestyle
Barbara & Sergiu	Quickstep	Quickstep	Rumba	Paso doble	-		Cha-cha-cha	Argentine tango	Waltz	Team Dance	Samba	Discofox	Freestyle	Bollywood	Contemporary	Fusion Dance	Jive	Foxtrot	Rumba	Salsa	Waltz	Freestyle
Julia & Massimo	Cha-cha-cha	Cha-cha-cha	Rumba	Quickstep	Salsa	Freestyle	Argentine tango	Viennese waltz	Jive	Team Dance	Contemporary	Discofox	Freestyle	Street	Foxtrot	Fusion Dance	Samba	Paso doble	Viennese waltz			
Iris & Christian	Waltz	Waltz	Paso doble	Contemporary	Tango	Freestyle	Cha-cha-cha	Jive	Rumba	Team Dance	Salsa	Discofox	Freestyle	Street	Quickstep	Fusion Dance						
Thomas & Regina	Quickstep	Quickstep	Cha-cha-cha	Viennese waltz	Rumba	Freestyle	Jive	Foxtrot	Contemporary	Team Dance	Samba	Discofox	Freestyle	Charleston								
Bela & Oana	Viennese waltz	Viennese waltz	Jive	Cha-cha-cha	Rumba	Freestyle	Foxtrot	Samba	Paso doble	Team Dance	Quickstep	Discofox										
Roman & Katja	Cha-cha-cha	Cha-cha-cha	Foxtrot	Jive	Contemporary	Freestyle	Paso doble	Viennese waltz	Tango	Team Dance												
Charlotte & Valentin	Waltz	Waltz	Cha-cha-cha	Tango	Jive	Freestyle	Samba	Rumba														
Jimi Blue & Renata	Quickstep	Quickstep	Paso doble	Salsa	Tango	Freestyle	Rumba															
Chakall & Marta	Cha-cha-cha	Cha-cha-cha	Rumba	Jive	Viennese waltz	Freestyle																
Heiko & Kathrin	Cha-cha-cha	Cha-cha-cha	Quickstep	Salsa																		
Jessica & Robert	Cha-cha-cha	Cha-cha-cha	Foxtrot																			
Tina & Vadim	Cha-cha-cha	Cha-cha-cha																				
