= We Can Do Better (song) =

Single by Matt Simons
- Released: April 4, 2018
- Genre: Pop
- Length: 2:59 (digital); 3:01 (acoustic); 3:44 (piano version)
- Label: Maspeth
- Songwriter(s): Matt Simons; Dan Romer; Emily Warren; Scott Harris
- Producer(s): Dan Romer; Mike Tuccillo

Music video
- "We Can Do Better" on YouTube

"We Can Do Better" is a 2018 song by the American singer-songwriter Matt Simons. Co-written by Matt Simons with Dan Romer, Emily Warren, Scott Harris and produced by Dan Romer and Mike Tuccillo, it became a charting hit single in a number of international charts. An official music video was released for the song.

== Charts ==
=== Weekly charts ===
Chart (2018)	Peak position
Austria (Ö3 Austria Top 40)	50
Belgium (Ultratop 50 Flanders)	29
Belgium (Ultratop 50 Wallonia)	8
Czech Republic (Rádio – Top 100)	24
Germany (GfK)	52
Italy (FIMI)	40
Netherlands (Dutch Top 40)	18
Netherlands (Single Top 100)	47
Portugal (AFP)	80
Slovenia (SloTop50)	30
Sweden (Sverigetopplistan)	92
Switzerland (Schweizer Hitparade)	67

=== Year-end charts ===
Chart (2018)	Position
Belgium (Ultratop Wallonia)	55
Netherlands (Dutch Top 40)	93

== Certifications ==
Region	Certification	Certified units/sales
France (SNEP)	Gold	100,000^{‡}
Italy (FIMI)	Platinum	50,000^{‡}
Netherlands (NVPI)	Platinum	80,000^{‡}
^{‡} Sales+streaming figures based on certification alone.
