= Ulli Potofski =

German sports journalist (1952–2025)

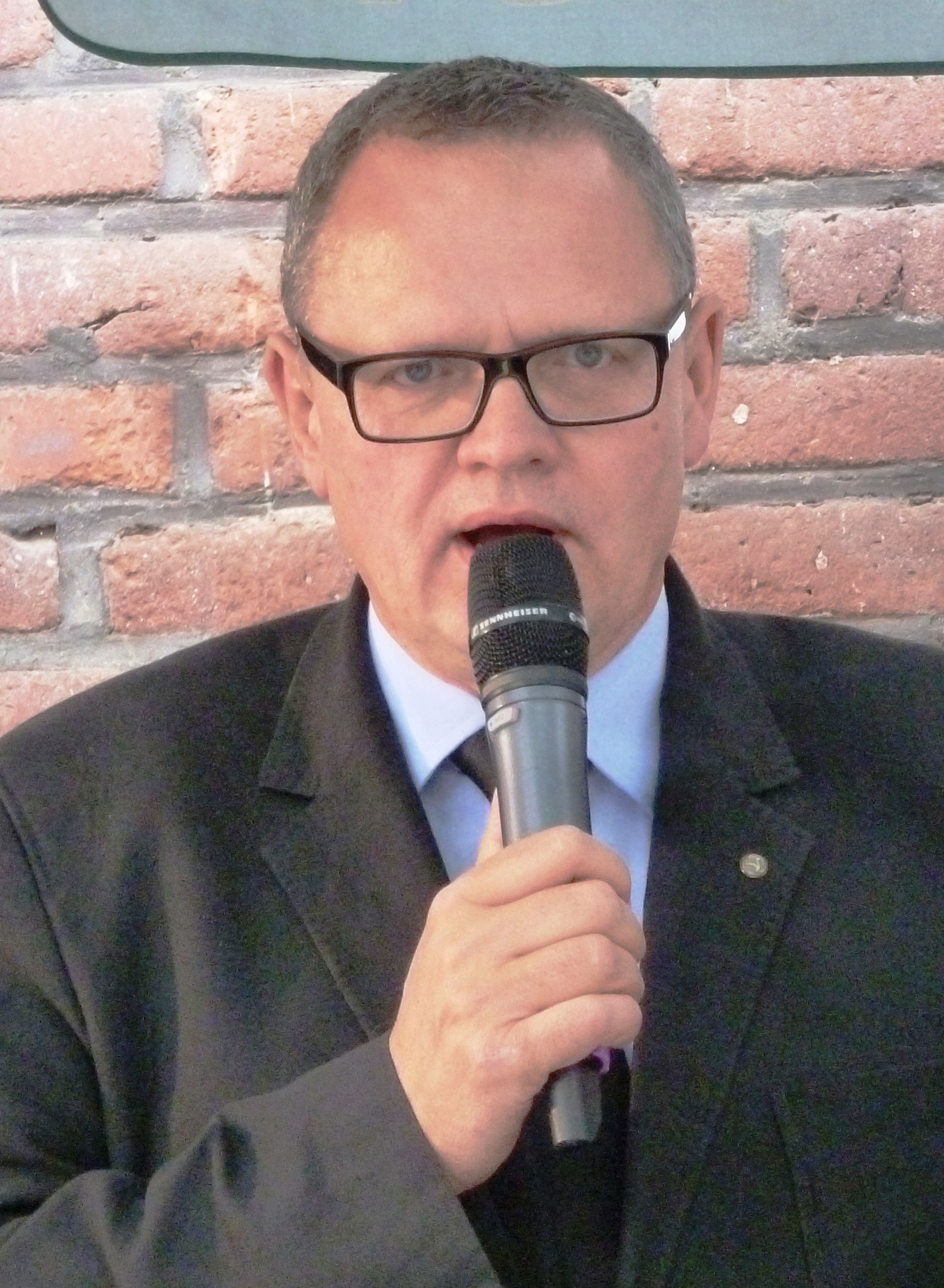
Potofski in 2014

Ulrich "Ulli" Potofski (German: [ˈʔʊlʁɪç (ˈʔʊli) poˈtɔfski]; 7 July 1952 – 2 August 2025) was a German sports journalist and television presenter.

== Life and career ==
Potofski was born in Gelsenkirchen on 7 July 1952. He began his career in 1970 at Radio Luxembourg. In the 1970s, he was also active as a puppeteer, pop singer and disc jockey. In 1979 he went to WDR radio as a sports reporter and in 1984 to RTL plus, where he was head of sports until 1992. In addition, he hosted the television show Anpfiff from 1988 to 1992. In 1993, Potofski hosted the RTL program Ein Tag wie kein anderer for a few months, and from 1998 to 2002 he hosted the program Auf Schalke on DSF.

From March to April 2016, he participated in the 9th season of the dance show Let's Dance. Together with his dance partner Kathrin Menzinger, he was eliminated after the first round, but came back into the show after fellow participant Franziska Traub was injured. In the ninth show, he was finally voted out of the show.

Potofski died after a short serious illness on 2 August 2025, at the age of 73.
