= Pieces (Matt Simons album) =

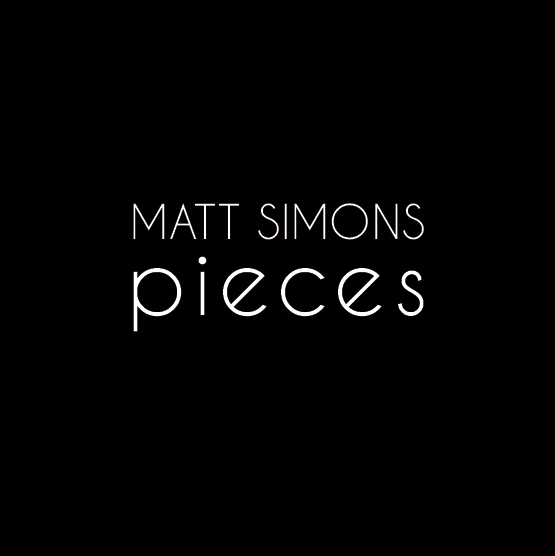

Studio album by Matt Simons
- Released: June 19, 2012 (United States); Various dates 2012–2013 (Europe)
- Recorded: 2011–2012
- Genre: Pop, R&B
- Producer: Stephen Gause

Matt Simons chronology
Living Proof (EP) (2010)	Pieces (2012)

Singles from Pieces
- 1. "Gone" Released: 2012; 2. "With You" Released: 2012

Pieces is the debut album of the American singer-songwriter and musician Matt Simons. Containing 10 tracks, nine of which his own compositions, the album was released in the United States on June 19, 2012. The album also contains one non-original track, "I Will Follow You into the Dark" which if from band Death Cab for Cutie. The debut single from the album produced by American producer and sound engineer Stephen Gause was "Gone" that was released in June 2012.

The second single from the album was "With You". The track became hugely popular in the Netherlands after it was picked as one of the theme songs on the Dutch soap television series Goede tijden, slechte tijden. The song was played during an episode broadcast in 2012 where the character Bing Mauricius is in a coma. The song became hugely popular with the Dutch public resulting in Simons' first charting hit reaching No. 10 on the Dutch Single Top 100 chart and the top 10 of the Dutch Top 40 chart. The album Pieces picked up steam appearing on the Dutch Albums Top 100 chart.

Pieces follows Simons' independent EP released in 2010 titled Living Proof.

== Track listing ==
1. "Emotionally Involved" (3:11)
2. "Gone" (3:42)
3. "Let Me Go On" (3:19)
4. "With You" (3:38)
5. "Pieces" (3:28)
6. "Miss You More" (4:36)
7. "Best Years" (3:20)
8. "I Will Follow You into the Dark" (3:55)
9. "Fall in Line" (Live in studio) (3:23)
10. "Pieces" (Acoustic) (3:47)

== Charts ==
Chart (2012–2013)	Peak position
Netherlands Mega Album Top 100	23
