= With You (Matt Simons song) =

Single by Matt Simons

from the album Pieces
- Released: 2012
- Genre: Folk
- Length: 3:38
- Songwriter: Matt Simons

"With You" is a song written and sung by American singer-songwriter Matt Simons and his second single taken from his debut album Pieces after the debut single "Gone".

The song gained fame in the Netherlands where it was picked as one of the theme songs on the Dutch soap television series Goede tijden, slechte tijden. The song was played during an episode broadcast in 2012 where the character Bing Mauricius is in a coma. The song became hugely popular with the Dutch public resulting in Simons' first charting hit reaching the top 10 of the Dutch Single Top 100 chart and the Dutch Top 40 chart. His debut album Pieces picked up steam appearing on the Dutch Albums Top 100 chart.

== Charts ==
=== Weekly charts ===
Chart (2013)	Peak position
Netherlands (Dutch Top 40)	8
Netherlands (Single Top 100)	8

=== Year-end charts ===
Chart (2013)	Position
Netherlands (Dutch Top 40)	33
Netherlands (Single Top 100)	47

== Certifications ==
Region	Certification	Certified units/sales
Netherlands (NVPI)	Gold	10,000^{^}
^{^} Shipments figures based on certification alone.
