= Let's Dance (German TV series) season 9 =

Let's Dance
- Season 9
- Celebrity winner: Victoria Swarovski
- Professional winner: Erich Klann
- No. of episodes: 12

Release
- Original network: RTL Television
- Original release: March 11 – June 3, 2016

Season chronology
- ← Previous; Season 8 Next → Season 10

The ninth season of Let's Dance started on 11 March 2016. Sylvie Meis and Daniel Hartwich returned as hosts while Motsi Mabuse, Joachim Llambi and Jorge González also returned as the judges. This also served as the second season to feature 14 couples.

== Couples ==
Celebrity	Occupation / Known for	Professional partner	Status
Niels Ruf	Television presenter	Otlile Mabuse	Eliminated 2nd on March 18, 2016
Franziska Traub	Actress	Vadim Garbuzov	Withdrew on March 31, 2016
Attila Hildmann	Author	Oxana Lebedew	Eliminated 3rd on April 1, 2016
Sonja Kirchberger	Actress	Ilia Russo (Week 1-3); Vadim Garbuzov (Week 4)	Eliminated 4th on April 8, 2016
Thomas Häßler	Footballer	Regina Luca	Eliminated 5th on April 15, 2016
Michael Wendler	Singer	Isabel Edvardsson	Eliminated 6th on April 22, 2016
Nastassja Kinski	Actress	Christian Polanc	Eliminated 7th on April 29, 2016
Alessandra Meyer-Wölden	Model	Sergiu Luca	Eliminated 8th on May 6, 2016
Ulrich Potofski	Television presenter	Kathrin Menzinger	Eliminated 1st & 9th on March 11, 2016 & May 13, 2016
Julius Brink	Volleyball player	Ekaterina Leonova	Eliminated 10th on May 20, 2016
Eric Stehfest	Actor	Oana Nechiti	Eliminated 11th on May 27, 2016
Jana Pallaske	Actress	Massimo Sinato	Third place on June 3, 2016
Sarah Lombardi	Singer	Robert Beitsch	Runner-Up on June 3, 2016
Victoria Swarovski	Singer, heiress & television presenter	Erich Klann	Winner on June 3, 2016

== Scoring chart ==
Couple	Place	1	2	3	4			5	6	7			8			9			10			11 Semi-Finals				12 Finals			
Couple	Place	1	2	3	(Note: Score from the first dance)	(Note: Score from the Boys vs Girls dance)	Σ	5	6	(Note: Score from the first dance)	(Note: Score from the team dance)	Σ	(Note: Score from the first dance)	(Note: Score from the discofox marathon)	Σ	(Note: Score from the first dance)	(Note: Score from the dance duels)	Σ	(Note: Score from the first dance)	(Note: Score from the fusion dance)	Σ	(Note: Score from the first dance)	(Note: Score from the second dance)	(Note: Score from the impro dance)	Σ	(Note: Score from the first dance)	(Note: Score from the second dance)	(Note: Score from the Freestyle)	Σ
Victoria & Erich	1	23	25	26	23	+4	27	25		30	21	51	28	+10	38	26	23	49	30	30	60	29	30	30	89	30	29	28	87
Sarah & Robert	2	11	16	14	14	+4	18	14	30	30	21	51	27	+2	29	23	20	43	20	23	43	23	26	24	73	21	30	27	78
Jana & Massimo	3	26	25	30	27	+4	31	25	26	24	21	45	29	+6	35	28	29	57	28	30	58	27	30	22	79	26	30	30	86
Eric & Oana	4	29	23	30	21	+7	28	22	23	28	21	49	30	+4	34	19	26	45	25	25	50	22	20	26	68				
Julius & Ekaterina	5	16	20	24	22	+7	29		27	21	21	42	22	+8	30	23	27	50	24	26	50								
Ulli & Kathrin	6	5		5	7	+7	14	6	6	4	21	25	3	+1	4	5	5	10											
Alessandra & Sergiu	7	21	11	17	22	+4	26	21	24	25	21	46	17	+3	20														
Nastassja & Christian	8	14	12	11	9	+4	13	16	13	15	21	36																	
Michael & Isabel	9	8	10	10	11	+7	18	7	12																				
Thomas & Regina	10	8	13	7	11	+7	18	10																					
Sonja & Vadim/Ilia	11	18	14	15	16	+4	20																						
Attila & Oxana	12	10	5	13																									
Franziska & Vadim	13	11	13	−																									
Niels & Otlile	14	8	6																										

Red numbers indicates the lowest score for each week.
Green numbers indicates the highest score for each week.
indicates the couple eliminated that week.
indicates the returning couple that finished in the bottom two.
indicates the couple that withdrew from the competition.
indicates the couple was eliminated but later returned to the competition.
indicates the winning couple.
indicates the runner-up couple.
indicates the third-place couple.

=== Averages ===
This table only counts for dances scored on a traditional 30-points scale.

Rank by average	Place	Couple	Total	Dances	Average
1	1	Victoria & Erich	486	18	27.0
1	3	Jana & Massimo	513	19	27.0
3	4	Eric & Oana	390	16	24.4
4	5	Julius & Ekaterina	273	12	22.8
5	2	Sarah & Robert	414	19	21.8
6	7	Alessandra & Sergiu	179	9	19.9
7	11	Sonja & Vadim/Ilia	63	4	15.8
8	8	Nastassja & Christian	111	8	13.9
9	13	Franziska & Vadim	24	2	12.0
10	10	Thomas & Regina	49	5	9.8
11	9	Michael & Isabel	58	6	9.7
12	12	Attila & Oxana	28	3	9.3
13	14	Niels & Otlile	14	2	7.0
14	6	Ulli & Kathrin	67	10	6.7

=== Highest and lowest scoring performances ===
The best and worst performances in each dance according to the judges' marks are as follows:

Dance	Best dancer(s)	Best score	Worst dancer(s)	Worst score
Cha-cha-cha	Eric Stehfest	29	Ulli Potofski	5
Quickstep	Victoria Swarovski	30	Attila Hildmann	10
Waltz	Victoria Swarovski	30	Ulli Potofski	7
Viennese waltz	Jana Pallaske	27	Niels Ruf	8
Rumba	Jana Pallaske	29	Attila Hildmann; Ulli Potofski	5
Jive	Eric Stehfest	28	Niels Ruf	6
Foxtrot	Victoria Swarovski	30	Ulli Potofski	5
Salsa	Victoria Swarovski	29	Alessandra Meyer-Wölden	11
Tango	Jana Pallaske (twice); Victoria Swarovski	30	Ulli Potofski	6
Contemporary	Eric Stehfest; Jana Pallaske; Sarah Lombardi (twice)	30	Michael Wendler	7
Paso doble	Sarah Lombardi; Victoria Swarovski	30	Ulli Potofski	6
Samba	Victoria Swarovski	29	Ulli Potofski	4
Argentine tango	Julius Brink	27	Ulli Potofski	5
Disco Marathon	Victoria Swarovski	10	Ulli Potofski	1
Freestyle	Jana Pallaske	30	Sarah Lombardi	27
Hip-Hop	Eric Stehfest	30	-	
Charleston	Victoria Swarovski	28	-	
Bollywood	Sarah Lombardi	27	-	
Rock n' Roll	Ulli Potofski	3	-	
Lambada	Jana Pallaske	29	-	
Lindy hop	Julius Brink	22	-	
Merengue	Alessandra Meyer-Wölden	17	-	
Team Dance (Week 7)	Eric Stehfest; Jana Pallaske; Victoria Swarovski; Sarah Lombardi; Julius Brink; Nastassja Kinski; Alessandra Meyer-Wölden; Ulli Potofski	21	-	
Fusion Dance (Week 10)	Jana Pallaske; Victoria Swarovski	30	Sarah Lombardi	23

=== Couples' Highest and lowest scoring performances ===
According to the traditional 30-point scale.

Couples	Highest Scoring Dances	Lowest Scoring Dances
Victoria & Erich	Tango, Quickstep, Fusion dance, Paso doble, Foxtrot & Waltz (30)	Team dance (21)
Sarah & Robert	Contemporary (twice) & Paso doble (30)	Quickstep (11)
Jana & Massimo	Tango (twice), Fusion dance, Contemporary & Freestyle (30)	Team dance (21)
Eric & Oana	Contemporary & Hip-Hop (30)	Quickstep (19)
Julius & Ekaterina	Foxtrot & Argentine tango (27)	Quickstep (16)
Ulli & Kathrin	Team dance (21)	Rock n' Roll (3)
Alessandra & Sergiu	Contemporary (25)	Salsa (11)
Nastassja & Christian	Team dance (21)	Cha-cha-cha (9)
Michael & Isabel	Waltz (12)	Contemporary (7)
Thomas & Regina	Jive (13)	Paso doble (7)
Sonja & Vadim/Ilia	Viennese waltz (18)	Jive (14)
Attila & Oxana	Jive (13)	Rumba (5)
Franziska & Vadim	Rumba (13)	Cha-cha-cha (11)
Niels & Otlile	Viennese waltz (8)	Jive (6)

== Weekly scores and songs ==
=== Week 1: Opening Night ===
Running order

Order	Couple	Dance	Music	Judge 1	Judge 2	Judge 3	Score	Result
1	Sarah & Robert	Quickstep	"Avenir" - Louane	4	4	3	11	Safe
2	Alessandra & Sergiu	Waltz	"What If" - Kate Winslet	7	7	7	21	Safe
3	Michael & Isabel	Cha-cha-cha	"Du hast mich tausend mal belogen" - Andrea Berg	3	3	2	8	Bottom two
4	Thomas & Regina	Waltz	"Heaven" - Bryan Adams	3	3	2	8	Safe
5	Victoria & Erich	Cha-cha-cha	"I Don't Like It, I Love It" - Flo Rida feat. Robin Thicke & Verdine White	8	8	7	23	Safe
6	Sonja & Ilia	Viennese waltz	"I Put a Spell on You" - Annie Lennox	7	6	5	18	Safe
7	Julius & Ekaterina	Quickstep	"Like Ice in the Sunshine" - The BossHoss	6	6	4	16	Safe
8	Franziska & Vadim	Cha-cha-cha	"She's a Lady" - Tom Jones	4	4	3	11	Safe
9	Niels & Otlile	Viennese waltz	"Where the Wild Roses Grow" - Nick Cave and the Bad Seeds & Kylie Minogue	3	3	2	8	Bottom three
10	Attila & Oxana	Quickstep	"Wonderwall" - Paul Anka	4	4	2	10	Safe
11	Ulli & Kathrin	Cha-cha-cha	"Daddy Cool" - Boney M.	2	2	1	5	Eliminated
12	Jana & Massimo	Cha-cha-cha	"Sugar" - Robin Schulz feat. Francesco Yates	9	9	8	26	Safe
13	Eric & Oana	Cha-cha-cha	"Goodbye" - Feder feat. Lyse	10	9	10	29	Safe
14	Nastassja & Christian	Viennese waltz	"Everybody Hurts" - Tina Arena	6	5	3	14	Safe

=== Week 2 ===
Running order

Order	Couple	Dance	Music	Judge 1	Judge 2	Judge 3	Score	Result
1	Alessandra & Sergiu	Salsa	"36 Grad" - 2Raumwohnung	4	4	3	11	Bottom two
2	Julius & Ekaterina	Rumba	"She's the One" - Robbie Williams	7	7	6	20	Safe
3	Attila & Oxana	Rumba	"When I Was Your Man" - Bruno Mars	2	2	1	5	Bottom three
4	Sarah & Robert	Salsa	"Vivir mi vida" - Marc Anthony	6	6	4	16	Safe
5	Thomas & Regina	Jive	"Crocodile Rock" - Elton John	5	5	3	13	Safe
6	Victoria & Erich	Foxtrot	"Supergirl" - Anna Naklab feat. Alle Farben & YOUNOTUS	9	9	7	25	Safe
7	Sonja & Ilia	Jive	"Je veux" - Zaz	5	5	4	14	Safe
8	Nastassja & Christian	Rumba	"I Want to Know What Love Is" - Mariah Carey	5	4	3	12	Safe
9	Michael & Isabel	Foxtrot	"Daydream Believer" - The Monkees	4	3	3	10	Safe
10	Jana & Massimo	Jive	"Flash mich" - Mark Forster	9	8	8	25	Safe
11	Niels & Otlile	Jive	"Bad Boy" - Miami Sound Machine	2	3	1	6	Eliminated
12	Franziska & Vadim	Rumba	"Private Dancer" - Tina Turner	5	5	3	13	Safe
13	Eric & Oana	Foxtrot	"Take Me to Church" - Hozier	9	8	6	23	Safe

=== Week 3: 80's Night ===
On March 31, Franziska Traub withdrew from the competition due to an injury. Actually Niels Ruf should fill in for her due to the rules but because of his behaviour during the show and afterwards it was decided that Ulli Potofski filled in for Traub.

Running order

Order	Couple	Dance	Music	Judge 1	Judge 2	Judge 3	Score	Result
1	Michael & Isabel	Jive	"Karma Chameleon" - Culture Club	4	4	2	10	Safe
2	Alessandra & Sergiu	Tango	"Sweet Dreams (Are Made of This)" - Eurythmics	6	6	5	17	Safe
3	Victoria & Erich	Jive	"Wake Me Up Before You Go-Go" - Wham!	9	9	8	26	Safe
4	Thomas & Regina	Paso doble	"Livin' on a Prayer" - Bon Jovi	3	3	1	7	Bottom two
5	Sarah & Robert	Rumba	"How Will I Know" - Whitney Houston	5	5	4	14	Safe
6	Sonja & Ilia	Rumba	"Lady in Red" - Chris de Burgh	6	5	4	15	Bottom three
7	Julius & Ekaterina	Tango	"Das Model" - Kraftwerk	9	8	7	24	Safe
8	Attila & Oxana	Jive	"Take On Me" - A-Ha	5	5	3	13	Eliminated
9	Eric & Oana	Contemporary	"Flugzeuge in meinem Bauch" - Herbert Grönemeyer	10	10	10	30	Safe
10	Ulli & Kathrin	Foxtrot	"Heartbreaker" - Dionne Warwick	2	2	1	5	Safe
11	Nastassja & Christian	Foxtrot	"Felicita" - Albano Carrisi & Romina Power	5	4	2	11	Safe
12	Jana & Massimo	Tango	"Let's Dance" - David Bowie	10	10	10	30	Safe

=== Week 4: 90's Night ===
On April 4 it was announced that Vadim Garbuzov will be Sonja Kirchberger's partner from now on after Ilia Russo injured his back and had to leave the competition. Also this week featured a "Boys vs Girls Battle" dance where the male pro dancers and celebrities danced against the female pro dancers and celebrities. The judges then decided which group performance was the better one.

Running order

Order	Couple	Dance	Music	Judge 1	Judge 2	Judge 3	Score	Result
1	Sarah & Robert	Cha-cha-cha	"Barbie Girl" - Aqua	5	5	4	14	Safe
2	Sonja & Vadim	Foxtrot	"Would I Lie to You?" - Charles & Eddie	6	6	4	16	Eliminated
3	Julius & Ekaterina	Samba	"Coco Jamboo" - Mr. President	8	8	6	22	Safe
4	Alessandra & Sergiu	Rumba	"It Must Have Been Love" - Roxette	8	8	6	22	Safe
5	Michael & Isabel	Quickstep	"Verdammt ich lieb' dich" - Matthias Reim	4	5	2	11	Safe
6	Nastassja & Christian	Cha-cha-cha	"Strong Enough" - Cher	4	3	2	9	Bottom two
7	Victoria & Erich	Rumba	"Un-Break My Heart" - Toni Braxton	8	8	7	23	Safe
8	Ulli & Kathrin	Waltz	"I Wonder Why" - Curtis Stigers	3	3	1	7	Bottom three
9	Eric & Oana	Samba	"Macarena" - Los Del Rio	7	8	6	21	Safe
10	Thomas & Regina	Contemporary	"Un'estate italiana" - Gianna Nannini & Edoardo Bennato	4	4	3	11	Safe
11	Jana & Massimo	Viennese waltz	"Nothing Else Matters" - Metallica	10	10	7	27	Safe
Boys vs Girls Battle
—N/a	Eric Stehfest; Julius Brink; Michael Wendler; Thomas Häßler; Ulli Potofski	Freestyle	"Everybody (Backstreet's Back)"一 Backstreet Boys	7				—N/a
—N/a	Alessandra Meyer-Wölden; Jana Pallaske; Nastassja Kinski; Sarah Lombardi; Sonja Kirchberger; Victoria Swarovski	Freestyle	"Wannabe"一 Spice Girls	4				—N/a

=== Week 5 ===
On April 13 it was announced that Julius Brink won't perform at Friday because he is injured (groin strain). He is automatically saved and will perform next week.

Running order

Order	Couple	Dance	Music	Judge 1	Judge 2	Judge 3	Score	Result
1	Alessandra & Sergiu	Paso doble	"Spectrum (Say My Name)" - Florence + the Machine	7	8	6	21	Safe
2	Ulli & Kathrin	Paso doble	"I'd Do Anything for Love (But I Won't Do That)" - Meat Loaf	2	3	1	6	Bottom three
3	Victoria & Erich	Samba	"Lean On" - Major Lazer	9	8	8	25	Safe
4	Thomas & Regina	Cha-cha-cha	"Easy Lover" - Phil Collins	4	4	2	10	Eliminated
5	Sarah & Robert	Foxtrot	"I Was Made for Lovin' You " - Maria Mena	6	6	2	14	Safe
6	Michael & Isabel	Contemporary	"Hey" - Yvonne Catterfeld	3	3	1	7	Bottom two
7	Eric & Oana	Waltz	"A Whiter Shade of Pale" - Procol Harum	8	8	6	22	Safe
8	Nastassja & Christian	Samba	"Ella, elle l'a" - France Gall	6	6	4	16	Safe
9	Jana & Massimo	Rumba	"Will You Love Me Tomorrow?" - Amy Winehouse	9	8	8	25	Safe
—N/a	Julius & Ekaterina	Given by						

=== Week 6: Movie Night ===
On April 20 it was announced that Victoria Swarovski won't perform on Friday because of a death in her family. She is automatically saved and will perform next week.

Running order

Order	Couple	Dance	Music	Movie	Judge 1	Judge 2	Judge 3	Score	Result
1	Ulli & Kathrin	Tango	"You'll Never Tango" - John Powell	Ice Age: Dawn of the Dinosaurs	3	2	1	6	Bottom three
2	Alessandra & Sergiu	Foxtrot	"Somewhere Over the Rainbow" - Judy Garland	Wizard of oz	9	8	7	24	Safe
3	Nastassja & Christian	Contemporary	"Orinoco Flow" - Enya	Shrek Forever After	6	5	2	13	Bottom two
4	Jana & Massimo	Foxtrot	"You Can Leave Your Hat On" - Joe Cocker	9½ Weeks	10	10	6	26	Safe
5	Michael & Isabel	Waltz	"Winnetou Theme"	Winnetou	4	5	3	12	Eliminated
6	Sarah & Robert	Contemporary	"Crazy in Love" - Beyoncé Knowles	Fifty Shades of Grey	10	10	10	30	Safe
7	Eric & Oana	Tango	"Welcome to Burlesque" - Cher	Burlesque	8	8	7	23	Safe
7	Eric & Oana	Argentine tango	"Welcome to Burlesque" - Cher	Burlesque	8	8	7	23	Safe
8	Julius & Ekaterina	Slowfox	"Raindrops Keep Fallin' on My Head" - B.J. Thomas	Butch Cassidy and the Sundance Kid	9	9	9	27	Safe
—N/a	Victoria & Erich	Given by							

=== Week 7: Team Dances Night ===
Running order

Order	Couple	Dance	Music	Judge 1	Judge 2	Judge 3	Score	Result
1	Nastassja & Christian	Salsa	"Matilda" - Harry Belafonte	6	6	3	15	Eliminated
2	Ulli & Kathrin	Samba	"Night Fever" - Bee Gees	1	1	2	4	Bottom three
3	Eric & Oana	Jive	"Reet Petite" - Jackie Wilson	10	9	9	28	Safe
4	Julius & Ekaterina	Cha-cha-cha	"Summer Nights" - John Travolta & Olivia Newton-John	8	7	6	21	Safe
5	Jana & Massimo	Samba	"Bailando" - Enrique Iglesias	9	8	7	24	Safe
6	Alessandra & Sergiu	Contemporary	"California Dreamin'" - Sia	9	8	8	25	Bottom two
7	Sarah & Robert	Paso doble	"Hora Zero" - Rodrigo Y Gabriela	10	10	10	30	Safe
8	Victoria & Erich	Tango	"El Antifaz" - Liberacion	10	10	10	30	Safe
Team Dances
9	Team "Ullinators"; Sarah & Robert; Eric & Oana; Alessandra & Sergiu; Ulli & Kathrin	Freestyle	"Sail" - AWOLNATION	7	7	7	21	—N/a
10	Team "Heart-Core"; Julius & Ekaterina; Victoria & Erich; Jana & Massimo; Nastassja & Christian	Freestyle	"Sail" - AWOLNATION	7	7	7	21	—N/a

=== Week 8: Around the World Night ===
Running order

Order	Couple	Dance	Music	Judge 1	Judge 2	Judge 3	Score	Result
1	Victoria & Erich	Charleston	"Happy" - C2C ft. Derek Martin	9	10	9	28	Safe
2	Alessandra & Sergiu	Merengue	"Suavemente" - Elvis Crespo	6	7	4	17	Eliminated
3	Sarah & Robert	Bollywood	"Soni Soni" - Udit Narayan, Jaspinder Narula, Udbhav & Manohar Shetty	10	10	7	27	Safe
4	Ulli & Kathrin	Rock n' Roll	"Blue Suede Shoes" - Elvis Presley	1	1	1	3	Bottom two
5	Julius & Ekaterina	Lindy hop	"Sing, Sing, Sing (With a Swing)" - The Andrews Sisters	8	8	6	22	Bottom three
6	Eric & Oana	Hip-Hop	"Men in Black" - Will Smith	10	10	10	30	Safe
7	Jana & Massimo	Lambada	"Lambada" - Kaoma	10	10	9	29	Safe
Discofox Marathon
—N/a	Ulli & Kathrin; Sarah & Robert; Alessandra & Sergiu; Eric & Oana; Jana & Massimo; Julius & Ekaterina; Victoria & Erich	Disco Marathon	"Biste braun, kriegste Fraun" - Mickie Krause "Ich lieb' Dich" - Pur "Pure Lust am Leben" - Geier Sturzflug "Ich sterb für dich" - Vanessa Mai "Warum hast du nicht nein gesagt" - Roland Kaiser & Maite Kelly "Fehlerfrei" - Helene Fischer "I Bums Di" - Der Jockel & Der Sommer	1; 2; 3; 4; 6; 8; 10				—N/a

=== Week 9: One Hit Wonder Night ===
This week featured no bottom group instead Potofski was announced to be eliminated at the beginning of the results announcement.

Running order

Order	Couple	Dance	Music	Judge 1	Judge 2	Judge 3	Score	Result
1	Julius & Ekaterina	Jive	"Mambo No. 5" - Lou Bega	8	8	7	23	Safe
2	Ulli & Kathrin	Rumba	"Love Is All Around" - Wet Wet Wet	2	2	1	5	Eliminated
3	Jana & Massimo	Quickstep	"The Way to Your Heart" - Soulsister	10	9	9	28	Safe
4	Eric & Oana	Quickstep	"Two Princes" - Spin Doctors	7	7	5	19	Safe
5	Victoria & Erich	Contemporary	"Show Me Heaven" - Maria McKee	9	9	8	26	Safe
6	Sarah & Robert	Viennese waltz	"Stop!" - Sam Brown	8	9	6	23	Safe
Dance Duels
7	Eric & Oana	Jive	"The Boy Does Nothing" - Alesha Dixon	9	9	8	26	—N/a
7	Victoria & Erich	Jive	"The Boy Does Nothing" - Alesha Dixon	8	8	7	23	—N/a
8	Julius & Ekaterina	Argentine tango	"Joe le taxi" - Vanessa Paradis	9	10	8	27	—N/a
8	Ulli & Kathrin	Argentine tango	"Joe le taxi" - Vanessa Paradis	2	2	1	5	—N/a
9	Jana & Massimo	Rumba	"After Dark" - Tito & Tarantula	10	10	9	29	—N/a
9	Sarah & Robert	Rumba	"After Dark" - Tito & Tarantula	7	7	6	20	—N/a

=== Week 10: Fusion Night ===
This week each couple performed a non learned dance and the second dance was a fusion dance, consisting out of two different dances.

Running order

Order	Couple	Dance	Music	Judge 1	Judge 2	Judge 3	Score	Result
1	Victoria & Erich	Quickstep (Single Dance)	"Walk Like an Egyptian" - The Bangles	10	10	10	30	Safe
1	Victoria & Erich	Rumba & Cha-cha-cha (Fusion Dance)	"On the Radio" - Donna Summer	10	10	10	30	Safe
2	Julius & Ekaterina	Viennese waltz (Single Dance)	"Like I'm Gonna Lose You" - Meghan Trainor & John Legend	9	9	6	24	Eliminated
2	Julius & Ekaterina	Rumba & Jive (Fusion Dance)	"Shut Up and Dance" - Tyler Moon & Walk the Moon	9	9	8	26	Eliminated
3	Sarah & Robert	Samba (Single Dance)	"Cheap Thrills" - Sia	8	7	5	20	Bottom two
3	Sarah & Robert	Viennese waltz & Contemporary (Fusion Dance)	"Girls Just Want to Have Fun" - Cyndi Lauper	8	8	7	23	Bottom two
4	Eric & Oana	Paso doble (Single Dance)	"Matador Paso" - Andy Fortuna	9	9	7	25	Safe
4	Eric & Oana	Contemporary & Jive (Fusion Dance)	"Dein ist mein ganzes Herz" - Heinz Rudolf Kunze	9	9	7	25	Safe
5	Jana & Massimo	Salsa (Single Dance)	"El Mismo Sol" - Alvaro Soler	10	9	9	28	Safe
5	Jana & Massimo	Argentine tango & Rumba (Fusion Dance)	"Hello" - Adele	10	10	10	30	Safe

=== Week 11: Semi-Final ===
For the second time every semi-finalist learned three individual dances while the third dance was an "impro dance" which means that the celebrities got the music only 20 minutes before they've performed. They didn't know the dance style and their costumes either.

Running order

Order	Couple	Dance	Music	Judge 1	Judge 2	Judge 3	Score	Result
1	Eric & Oana	Salsa	"Oye Mi Canto (Hear My Voice)" - Gloria Estefan	8	8	6	22	Eliminated
1	Eric & Oana	Rumba	"Love Me Tender" - Elvis Presley	7	8	5	20	Eliminated
1	Eric & Oana	Foxtrot	"Stand By Your Man" - Tammy Wynette	10	9	7	26	Eliminated
2	Victoria & Erich	Salsa	"La Bomba" - Culcha Candela	10	10	9	29	Safe
2	Victoria & Erich	Paso doble	"El sombrero blanco" - James Horner	10	10	10	30	Safe
2	Victoria & Erich	Foxtrot	"Don't Worry, Be Happy" - Bobby McFerrin	10	10	10	30	Safe
3	Sarah & Robert	Jive	"Ex's & Oh's" - Elle King	8	8	7	23	Safe
3	Sarah & Robert	Tango	"Another Way to Die" - Jack White & Alicia Keys	9	10	7	26	Safe
3	Sarah & Robert	Salsa	"La Vida Es Un Carnaval" - Celia Cruz	9	8	7	24	Safe
4	Jana & Massimo	Paso doble	"Iron" - Woodkid	9	9	9	27	Bottom two
4	Jana & Massimo	Contemporary	"True Colors" - Cyndi Lauper	10	10	10	30	Bottom two
4	Jana & Massimo	Cha-cha-cha	"Cake by the Ocean" - DNCE	8	8	6	22	Bottom two

=== Week 12: Final ===
Running order

Order	Couple	Dance	Music	Judge 1	Judge 2	Judge 3	Score	Result
1	Sarah & Robert	Cha-cha-cha	"Better When I'm Dancing" - Meghan Trainor	8	7	6	21	Runner-Up
1	Sarah & Robert	Contemporary	"Crazy in Love" - Beyoncé Knowles	10	10	10	30	Runner-Up
1	Sarah & Robert	Freestyle	Medley of Frozen, Aladdin & The Lion King	9	9	9	27	Runner-Up
2	Victoria & Erich	Waltz	"Wie Schön du bist" - Sarah Connor	10	10	10	30	Winner
2	Victoria & Erich	Samba	"Lean On - Major Lazer	10	10	9	29	Winner
2	Victoria & Erich	Freestyle	Medley of The Mask	9	9	10	28	Winner
3	Jana & Massimo	Jive	"One Way or Another" - Blondie	9	9	8	26	Third place
3	Jana & Massimo	Tango	"Let's Dance" - David Bowie	10	10	10	30	Third place
3	Jana & Massimo	Freestyle	Medley of The Hunger Games	10	10	10	30	Third place

Encore performances by the eliminated couples

Order	Couple (Note: Nasstasja changed her partner to Ilia since they started to date so Christian partnered with Sonja) (Note: Due to health problems Michael Wendler was unable to dance)	Dance	Music
1	Niels & Otlile	Viennese waltz	"Where the Wild Roses Grow" - Nick Cave and the Bad Seeds & Kylie Minogue
2	Franziska & Vadim	Cha-cha-cha	"She's a Lady" - Tom Jones
3	Attila & Oxana	Jive	"Take On Me" - A-Ha
4	Sonja & Christian	Viennese waltz	"I Put a Spell on You" - Annie Lennox
5	Thomas & Regina	Jive	"Crocodile Rock" - Elton John
6	Nastassja & Ilia	Rumba	"I Want to Know What Love Is" - Mariah Carey
7	Alessandra & Sergiu	Paso doble	"Spectrum (Say My Name)" - Florence + the Machine
8	Ulli & Kathrin	Rumba	"Love Is All Around" - Wet Wet Wet
9	Julius & Ekaterina	Foxtrot	"Raindrops Keep Fallin' on My Head" - B.J. Thomas
10	Eric & Oana	Cha-cha-cha	"Goodbye" - Feder feat. Lyser

== Dance chart ==
Highest scoring dance
Lowest scoring dance
Did not scored (encore performance in the finale)
The pair did not perform this week
Withdrew from the competition

Couple	1	2	3	4		5	6	7		8		9		10		11			12		
Victoria & Erich	Cha-cha-cha	Foxtrot	Jive	Rumba	Freestyle	Samba		Tango	Freestyle	Charleston	Disco Marathon	Contemporary	Jive	Quickstep	Rumba; Cha-cha-cha	Salsa	Paso doble	Foxtrot	Waltz	Samba	Freestyle
Sarah & Robert	Quickstep	Salsa	Rumba	Cha-cha-cha	Freestyle	Foxtrot	Contemporary	Paso doble	Freestyle	Bollywood	Disco Marathon	Viennese waltz	Rumba	Samba	Viennese waltz Contemporary	Jive	Tango	Salsa	Cha-cha-cha	Contemporary	Freestyle
Jana & Massimo	Cha-cha-cha	Jive	Tango	Viennese waltz	Freestyle	Rumba	Foxtrot	Samba	Freestyle	Lambada	Disco Marathon	Quickstep	Rumba	Salsa	Argentine tango Rumba	Paso doble	Contemporary	Cha-cha-cha	Jive	Tango	Freestyle
Eric & Oana	Cha-cha-cha	Foxtrot	Contemporary	Samba	Freestyle	Waltz	Tango	Jive	Freestyle	Hip-Hop	Disco Marathon	Quickstep	Jive	Paso doble	Contemporary; Jive	Salsa	Rumba	Foxtrot			Cha-cha-cha
Julius & Ekaterina	Quickstep	Rumba	Tango	Samba	Freestyle		Foxtrot	Cha-cha-cha	Freestyle	Lindy Hop	Disco Marathon	Jive	Argentine tango	Viennese waltz	Rumba; Jive						Foxtrot
Ulli & Kathrin	Cha-cha-cha		Foxtrot	Waltz	Freestyle	Paso doble	Tango	Samba	Freestyle	Rock n' Roll	Disco Marathon	Rumba	Argentine tango								Rumba
Alessandra & Sergiu	Waltz	Salsa	Tango	Rumba	Freestyle	Paso doble	Foxtrot	Contemporary	Freestyle	Merengue	Disco Marathon										Paso doble
Nastassja & Christian	Viennese waltz	Rumba	Foxtrot	Cha-cha-cha	Freestyle	Samba	Contemporary	Salsa	Freestyle												Rumba
Michael & Isabel	Cha-cha-cha	Foxtrot	Jive	Quickstep	Freestyle	Contemporary	Waltz														
Thomas & Regina	Waltz	Jive	Paso doble	Contemporary	Freestyle	Cha-cha-cha															Jive
Sonja & Vadim/Ilia	Viennese waltz	Jive	Rumba	Foxtrot	Freestyle																Viennese waltz
Attila & Oxana	Quickstep	Rumba	Jive																		Jive
Franziska & Vadim	Cha-cha-cha	Rumba																			Cha-cha-cha
Niels & Otlile	Viennese waltz	Jive																			Viennese waltz
