= Deepend =

Dutch DJ/producer

- Origin: Roermond, Netherlands
- Genre: Deep house
- Occupations: DJ; record producer
- Instrument: Digital audio workstation
- Years active: 2012–present
- Labels: Spinnin'; Ultra; Universal Republic; Armada; PIAS; Copenhagen; The Bearded Man
- Members: Falco van den Aker
- Past members: Bob van Ratingen

Falco van den Aker, professionally known as Deepend is a Dutch DJ/producer. He gained international recognition after his remix of Matt Simons' "Catch & Release" peaked at number one in five countries and the European Airplay charts. The DJ racked in over 250 million Spotify plays and 80 million YouTube streams for the remix. Deepend was originally a duo consisting of van den Aker and fellow Dutch producer Bob van Ratingen; van Ratingen left in 2018 and van den Aker now uses the Deepend name as a solo project.

== Career ==
Deepend's remix of Matt Simons' "Catch & Release" song has become the second most played song on Dutch radio in 2016.

They released a collaboration via Spinnin' Records with Sam Feldt titled "Runaways" which featured vocals from Teemu. A remix pack for the song was later released featuring remixes from Jay Hardway, M-22, Muzzaik & Stadiumx, eSquire, Jonathan Pitch, Afreaux and Wild Culture.

== Discography ==
=== Singles ===
Title	Year	Peak chart positions										Certifications	Album
Title	Year	NL	AUT	BEL	HUN	GER	POR	SLK	SPN	SWE	SWI	Certifications	Album
"LCD" (featuring Lauren)	2012	—	—	—	—	—	—	—	—	—	—		Non-album singles
"Turn It Back" (featuring Phable)	2014	—	—	—	—	—	—	—	—	—	—		Non-album singles
"Catch & Release (Deepend Remix)" (by Matt Simons)	2015	5	4	1	5	1	1	1	1	47	2	BEA: Platinum; BVMI: Platinum; FIMI: Gold	Non-album singles
"I'm Just a Skipping Stone" (with Claire Guerreso)	2016	—	—	2	—	—	—	—	—	—	—		Non-album singles
"I'm Intoxicated"	2016	—	—	—	—	—	—	—	—	—	—		Non-album singles
"Runaways" (with Sam Feldt featuring Teemu)	2016	—	—	17	—	—	—	—	—	89	—		Non-album singles
"Every Little Thing" (featuring Deb's Daughter)	2017	—	—	—	—	—	—	—	—	—	—		Non-album singles
"Woke Up in Bangkok" (with YouNotUs featuring Martin Gallop)	2018	—	—	—	—	—	—	—	—	48	—		Non-album singles
"Could Be Love" (with Joe Killington)	2018	—	—	—	—	—	—	—	—	82	—		Non-album singles
"Only Love"	2018	—	—	—	—	—	—	—	—	—	—		Non-album singles
"One Thing Left To Do" (featuring Hanne Mjøen)	2019	—	—	—	—	—	—	—	—	—	—		Non-album singles
"Be Yours"	2019	—	—	—	—	—	—	—	—	—	—		Non-album singles
"My Heart (NaNaNa)" (with YouNotUs featuring Faulhaber)	2020	—	—	—	—	—	—	—	—	—	—		Non-album singles
"Skinny Dip (Komodo)" (featuring Philip Strand)	2020	—	—	—	—	—	—	—	—	—	—		Non-album singles
"Lonely" (featuring Malou)	2021	—	—	—	—	—	—	—	—	—	—		Non-album singles
"Beautiful" (with Griff Clawson)	2021	—	—	—	—	—	—	—	—	—	—		Non-album singles
"All Good" (with Julian Perretta)	2021	—	—	—	—	—	—	—	—	—	—		Non-album singles
"Take It Easy" (with David Benjamin)	2021	—	—	—	—	—	—	—	—	—	—		Non-album singles
"I Hate Everyone But You" (with Phil Soda)	2022	—	—	—	—	—	—	—	—	—	—		Non-album singles
"Good News" (with Lucas Estrada and Philip Strand)	2022	—	—	—	—	—	—	—	—	—	—		Non-album singles
"Keep It Rough" (with Wedont)	2023	—	—	—	—	—	—	—	—	—	—		Non-album singles
"Close Friends" (with Svnsets)	2024	—	—	—	—	—	—	—	—	—	—		Non-album singles
"Sinners" (with Sam Feldt)	2025	—	—	—	—	—	—	—	—	—	—		Non-album singles
"—" denotes a recording that did not chart or was not released in that territory.

=== Remixes ===
Year	Title	Original artist(s)
2012	"Need U" (Deepend Ibiza Sunset Mix)	Funkda
2014	When You Call (Deepend Remix)	July Child
2015	Catch & Release (Deepend Remix)	Matt Simons
2015	Anymore (Deepend Remix)	Alphabet (featuring Arc)
2015	Solid Ground (Deepend Remix)	Alex Vargas
2015	Dream (Deepend Remix)	Autograf
2016	Heatwave (Deepend Remix)	Robin Schulz (featuring Akon)
2016	I Hate U, I Love U (Deepend Remix)	Gnash (featuring Olivia O'Brien)
2018	Fading (Deepend Remix)	Alle Farben (with Ilira)
2018	Viens on s'aime (Deepend Remix)	Slimane
2019	So am I (Deepend Remix)	Ava Max
2020	I'm Not Worth It (Deepend Remix)	NEFFEX
