= Matt Simons =

American singer-songwriter (born 1987)

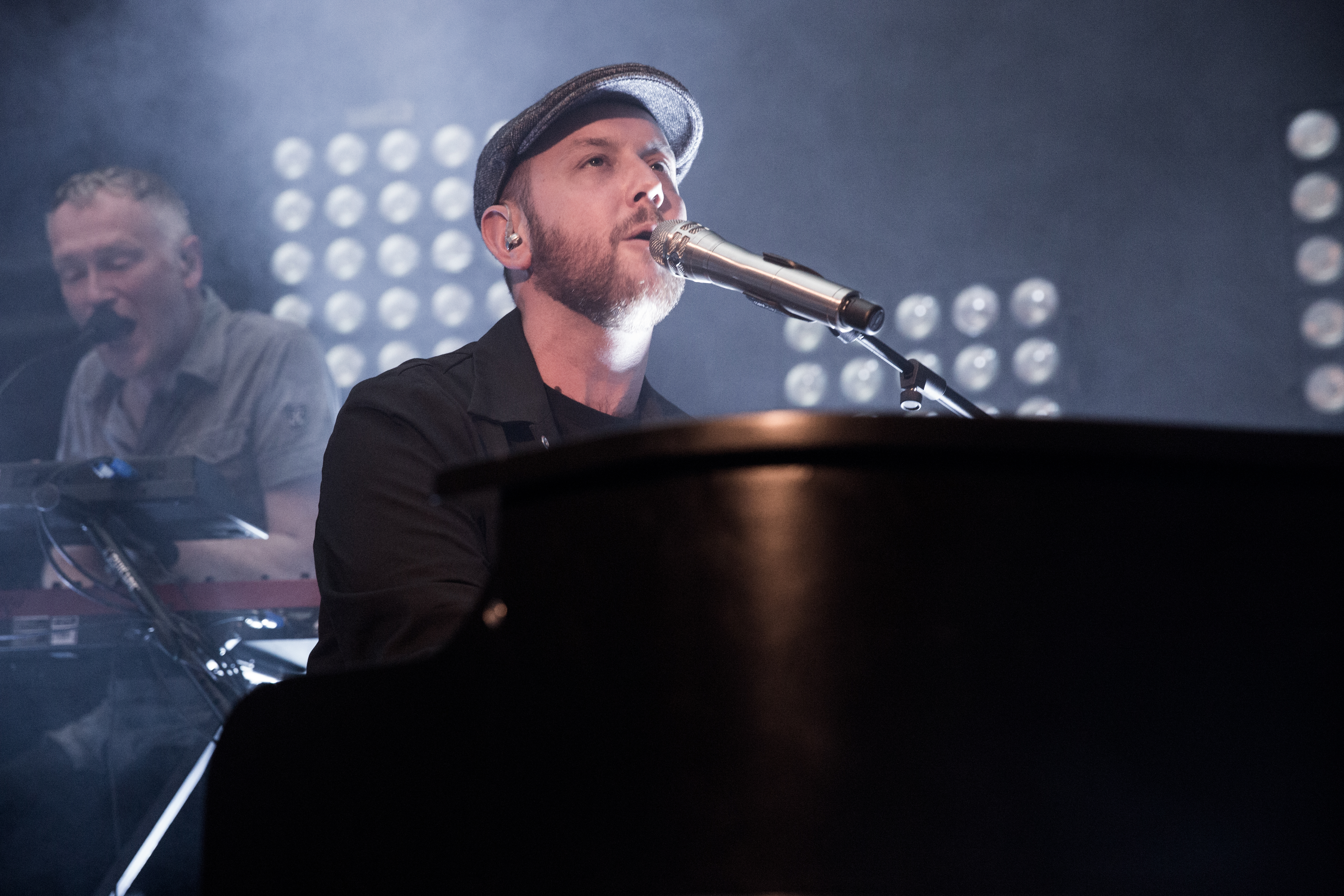

Background information
- Born: February 20, 1987 (age 39); Palo Alto, California, U.S.
- Genres: Pop
- Years active: 2010–present
- Label: PIAS Recordings
- Website: mattsimonsmusic.com

Matt Simons (born February 20, 1987) is an American singer-songwriter based in Brooklyn, New York City. Self-releasing his first EP Fall in Line in 2009, he has since gone on to release two full-length albums globally, achieving chart success across Europe, South Africa, and the Americas.

== Early life and education ==
Matt Simons was born and brought up in Palo Alto, California, attending Henry M. Gunn High School. Hailing from a musical family, his grandparents were both opera singers in Los Angeles. Having played the saxophone from an early age, he got a degree in jazz saxophone performance at the Purchase College Conservatory, as well as learning to play on piano, switching to clarinet, guitar, and saxophone, eventually settling back on piano.

== Career ==
He released his second EP Living Proof in 2010 and spent 2011 touring the United States and Europe, including the UK, Germany and the Netherlands. He usually plays piano and keyboards while singing. He also plays the saxophone, included improvised solos on the track "Fall in Line" and in live performances of "I'm Already Over You".

He released his debut album Pieces on 19 June 2012, "Gone" being his debut single. The 10-track album with 9 being his own compositions was produced by Nashville producer and sound engineer Stephen Goose by David.

Simons gained fame in the Netherlands after his rendition of "With You" taken from his album Pieces was picked as one of the theme songs on the Dutch soap television series Goede tijden, slechte tijden. The song reached No. 8 on the Dutch Single Top 100 chart and also peaked at No. 8 in the Dutch Top 40 chart. It was also picked as Mega Hit by the Dutch radio station 3FM in January 2013. As a result the album Pieces also appeared on the Dutch Albums Top 100 chart.

His greatest commercial success came with "Catch & Release", the title track from his similarly titled album Catch & Release, released in 2014. Originally it became a hit in the Netherlands and Spain as it appeared on the album, but the song saw even further success when it was remixed in 2015 by Dutch house duo producers Deepend, charting as "Catch & Release (Deepend Remix)" across Europe, reaching number 1 in Spain, Belgium, Germany and France, as well as reaching gold status in Norway, Portugal, France, Canada, South Africa, and Austria, and platinum status in Belgium, Italy, Germany, Netherlands, Ireland, Spain, Sweden and Switzerland.

In 2018, he returned with the single "We Can Do Better", released April 4, and announced more music and his third album to be released later in the year.

== Discography ==
=== Albums ===
Year	Album	AUT	BEL (Fl)	BEL (Wa)	GER	NLD	SWI	SWE
2012	Pieces	—	—	—	—	23	—	—
2014	Catch & Release	32	167	95	37	12	15	50
2019	After the Landslide	—	—	—	—	24	—	—
2022	Identity Crisis	—	—	—	—	—	—	—
"—" denotes a recording that did not chart or was not released in that territory.

=== Extended plays ===
Year	Title
2009	Fall in Line
2010	Living Proof
2016	When the Lights Go Down

=== Singles ===
==== As lead artist ====
Year	Title	Peak positions						
Year	Title	AUT	BEL (Fl)	BEL (Wa)	FRA	GER	NLD	SWE
2012	"Gone"	—	—	—	—	—	—	—
2012	"With You"	—	—	—	—	—	8	—
2014	"Catch & Release"	—	—	58	93	—	100	—
2015	"Catch & Release" (Deepend Remix)	4	1	1	1	1	5	47
2015	"You Can Come Back Home"	—	—	—	—	—	43	—
2016	"Breng me naar het water" (with Marco Borsato)	—	53	—	—	—	21	—
2016	"How Do I Know?" (with Anne Sila)	—	—	96	—	—	—	—
2016	"Lose Control"	64	56	37	—	76	43	—
2016	"When the Lights Go Out"	—	— (Note: "When the Lights Go Out" did not enter the Flanders Ultratop chart, but did enter the Ultratip chart.)	— (Note: "When the Lights Go Out" did not enter the Wallonia Ultratop chart, but did enter the Ultratip chart.)	—	—	—	—
2018	"We Can Do Better"	50	29	8	—	52	47	92
2019	"Open Up"	—	—	15	—	59	—	—
2020	"Cold"	—	—	—	—	—	—	—
2020	"Better Tomorrow"	—	—	—	—	—	—	—
2021	"Identity Crisis"	—	—	—	—	—	—	—
2021	"Self Control"	—	—	—	—	—	—	—
2021	"Too Much"	—	—	—	—	—	—	—
"—" denotes a recording that did not chart or was not released in that territory.

==== As featured artist ====
Year	Title	Peak positions	
Year	Title	BEL (Fl)	NLD
2016	"With You" (Dash Berlin featuring Matt Simons)		
2018	"Lay Your Worry Down" (Milow featuring Matt Simons)	28	—
2022	"Ik wist het" (Tabitha featuring Matt Simons)	—	60
"—" denotes a recording that did not chart or was not released in that territory.

== Filmography ==
- 2012: Goede tijden, slechte tijden (theme song "With You")
