= Catch & Release (song) =

2014 song by Matt Simons

Single by Matt Simons

from the album Catch & Release
- Released: 19 September 2014
- Genre: Pop
- Songwriters: Matt Simons; Ryan A

"Catch & Release (Deepend Remix)"

Single by Matt Simons
- Released: 2 March 2015
- Genre: Deep house
- Length: 3:15
- Songwriters: Matt Simons; Erik Mattiasson
- Producers: Falco van den Aker; Bob van Ratingen

"Catch & Release" is a song by American singer-songwriter Matt Simons taken from his album of the same name. It was released in September 2014 and became a hit in the Netherlands, Spain, Portugal, France, Switzerland and Belgium.

== Deepend remix ==
The song had much greater success when it was remixed by Dutch house DJ and producer duo Deepend (Bob van Ratingen and Falco van den Aker). This version released on 2 March 2015, was a hit in many European charts, making it to number 1 in Belgium (in both Flanders and Wallonia), Germany and France, as well as number 4 in Austria, and also charting in Switzerland.

== Charts ==
=== Matt Simons original ===
Chart (2014–16)	Peak position
Belgium (Ultratip Bubbling Under Wallonia)	8
Czech Republic Airplay (ČNS IFPI)	1
France (SNEP)	197
Netherlands (Single Top 100)	100

=== Deepend Remix ===
Chart (2015–16)	Peak position
Austria (Ö3 Austria Top 40)	4
Belgium (Ultratop 50 Flanders)	1
Belgium (Ultratop 50 Wallonia)	1
France (SNEP)	1
Germany (GfK)	1
Hungary (Rádiós Top 40)	9
Hungary (Single Top 40)	5
Ireland (IRMA)	33
Italy (FIMI)	64
Lebanon (Lebanese Top 20)	15
Netherlands (Dutch Top 40)	6
Netherlands (Single Top 100)	5
Poland Airplay (ZPAV)	6
Portugal (AFP)	7
Portugal Digital Songs (Billboard)	1
Slovakia Airplay (ČNS IFPI)	1
Slovenia (SloTop50)	22
Spain (Promusicae)	11
Sweden (Sverigetopplistan)	47
Switzerland (Schweizer Hitparade)	2
UK Singles (Official Charts Company)	144

=== Year-end charts ===
Chart (2015)	Position
Belgium (Ultratop 50 Flanders)	20
Belgium (Ultratop 50 Wallonia)	55
France (SNEP)	160
Germany (Official German Charts)	70
Chart (2016)	Position
Austria (Ö3 Austria Top 40)	51
Belgium (Ultratop 50 Wallonia)	62
France (SNEP)	14
Germany (Official German Charts)	52
Hungary (Rádiós Top 40)	20
Hungary (Single Top 40)	17
Netherlands (Dutch Top 40)	24
Netherlands (Single Top 100)	14
Poland (ZPAV)	25
Spain (PROMUSICAE)	29
Switzerland (Schweizer Hitparade)	23

== Certifications ==
Region	Certification	Certified units/sales
Belgium (BRMA)	Platinum	20,000^{‡}
Brazil (Pro-Música Brasil)	2× Platinum	120,000^{‡}
Canada (Music Canada)	Platinum	80,000^{‡}
Denmark (IFPI Danmark)	Gold	45,000^{‡}
France (SNEP)	Diamond	233,333^{‡}
Germany (BVMI)	Platinum	400,000^{‡}
Italy (FIMI)	2× Platinum	100,000^{‡}
Netherlands (NVPI)	2× Platinum	60,000^{‡}
New Zealand (RMNZ)	Platinum	30,000^{‡}
Portugal (AFP)	Gold	10,000^{‡}
Spain (Promusicae)	3× Platinum	180,000^{‡}
Switzerland (IFPI Switzerland)	Platinum	30,000^{‡}
United Kingdom (BPI)	Silver	200,000^{‡}
United States (RIAA)	Gold	500,000^{‡}
^{‡} Sales+streaming figures based on certification alone.
