= PNL discography =

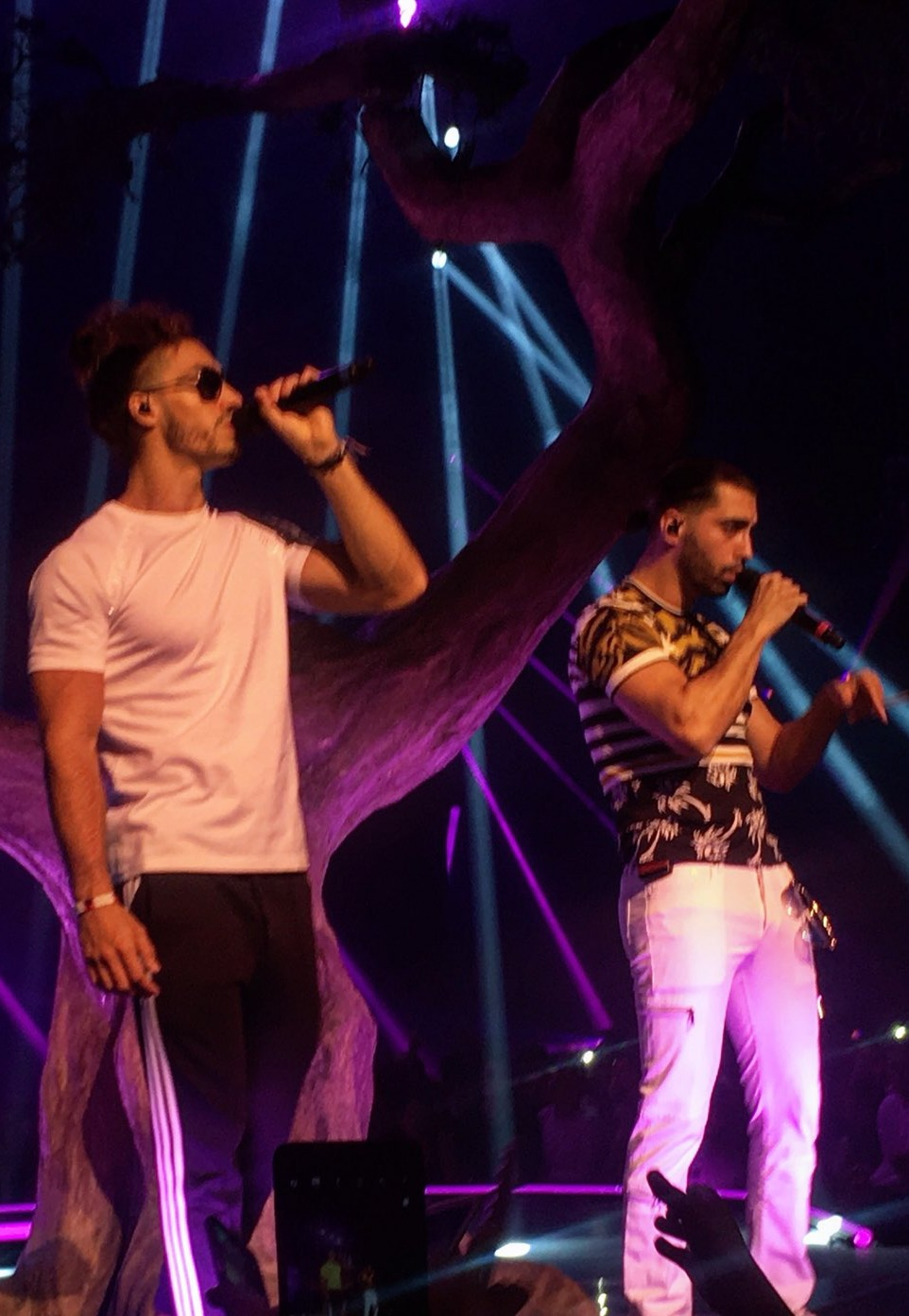
- PNL performing in 2017
- Studio albums: 3
- Singles: 27
- Music videos: 23
- Mixtapes: 1

French hip hop duo PNL have released three studio albums, one mixtape, twenty-seven singles and twenty-three music videos. In 2015, the duo released their debut mixtape, Que la famille and debut studio album, Le Monde Chico. In 2016, they released their second album Dans la légende, which has peaked at number one on the French Albums chart and sold over a million copies worldwide. PNL's third album, Deux frères (2019), supported by the number one singles "À l'ammoniaque", "91's" and "Au DD". has also topped the chart in France.

== Albums ==
=== Studio albums ===
List of studio albums, with selected details, chart positions, sales, and certifications
Title	Details	Peak chart positions									Sales	Certifications
Title	Details	FRA	AUT	BEL (Fl)	BEL (Wa)	CAN	GER	NLD	SPA	SWI	Sales	Certifications
Le Monde Chico	Released: 30 October 2015; Label: QLF; Format: LP, CD, digital download, streaming	2	—	—	12	—	—	—	—	11		SNEP: Diamond
Dans la légende	Released: 16 September 2016; Label: QLF; Format: LP, CD, digital download, streaming	1	—	39	1	86	—	75	94	1		SNEP: Diamond; BRMA: Gold
Deux frères	Released: 5 April 2019; Label: QLF; Format: LP, CD, digital download, streaming	1	50	8	1	31	70	13	77	1	FRA: 700,000	SNEP: 2× Diamond; BRMA: Gold
"—" denotes a recording that did not chart or was not released in that territory.

=== Mixtapes ===
List of mixtapes, with selected details, chart positions, sales, and certifications
Title	Details	Peak chart positions		Sales	Certifications
Title	Details	FRA	BEL (Wa)	Sales	Certifications
Que la famille	Released: 2 March 2015; Label: QLF; Format: CD, digital download, streaming	82	113	FRA: 100,000	SNEP: 2× Platinum

== Singles ==
List of singles, showing year released, selected chart positions, certifications, and originating album
Title	Year	Peak chart positions			Certifications	Album
Title	Year	FRA	BEL (Wa)	SWI	Certifications	Album
"Différents"	2014	—	—	—		Que la famille
"Je vis, je visser"	2014	—	—	—	SNEP: Gold	Que la famille
"Gala gala"	2014	—	—	—		Que la famille
"La petite voix"	2014	—	—	—		Que la famille
"J'comprends pas"	2015	—	—	—		Que la famille
"Simba"	2015	—	—	—		Que la famille
"PTQS (Plus Tony que Sosa)"	2015	101	—	—		Le monde Chico
"Le monde ou rien"	2015	77	32	—	SNEP: Platinum	Le monde Chico
"J'suis PNL"	2015	130	—	—		Le monde Chico
"Dans ta rue"	2015	117	—	—	SNEP: Gold	Le monde Chico
"Oh lala"	2015	93	—	—	SNEP: Platinum	Le monde Chico
"Tempête"	2015	—	—	—		Le monde Chico
"Lion"	2015	136	—	—	SNEP: Platinum	Non-album single
"La vie est belle"	2016	99	—	—	SNEP: Platinum	Dans la légende
"DA"	2016	20	—	—	SNEP: Diamond	Dans la légende
"J'suis QLF"	2016	29	—	—	SNEP: Diamond	Dans la légende
"Naha"	2016	2	19	35	SNEP: Diamond	Dans la légende
"Onizuka"	2016	17	38	90	SNEP: Diamond	Dans la légende
"Bené"	2017	13	38	68	SNEP: Diamond	Dans la légende
"Jusqu'au dernier gramme"	2017	41	—	—	SNEP: Diamond	Dans la légende
"À l'ammoniaque"	2018	1	14	17	SNEP: Diamond	Deux frères
"91's"	2018	1	7	22	SNEP: Diamond	Deux frères
"Au DD"	2019	1	1	2	SNEP: Diamond; BRMA: Platinum	Deux frères
"Deux frères"	2019	2	46	18	SNEP: Diamond	Deux frères
"Blanka"	2019	4	—	52	SNEP: Diamond	Deux frères
"Mowgli II"	2019	3	9	41	SNEP: Diamond	Non-album singles
"Tahia"	2019	23	—	—	SNEP: Gold	Non-album singles
"Gaza" (with Un jour de paix)	2023	3	25	—	SNEP: Gold	Non-album singles
"—" denotes a recording that did not chart or was not released in that territory.

== Other charted songs ==
List of other charted songs, showing year released, selected chart positions, certifications, and originating album
Title	Year	Peak chart positions			Certifications	Album
Title	Year	FRA	BEL (Wa)	SWI	Certifications	Album
"Sur Paname"	2015	104	—	—	SNEP: Gold	Le monde Chico
"Abonné"	2015	160	—	—	SNEP: Gold	Le monde Chico
"Mexico"	2015	173	—	—	SNEP: Gold	Le monde Chico
"Porte de Mesrine"	2015	186	—	—		Le monde Chico
"Rebenga" (featuring RKM)	2015	130	—	—	SNEP: Platinum	Le monde Chico
"Que la mif" (featuring Spion, Pti Moha, F430 & Ilinas)	2015	189	—	—	SNEP: Gold	Le monde Chico
"Dans la légende"	2016	18	—	55	SNEP: Diamond	Dans la légende
"Humain"	2016	42	—	—	SNEP: Diamond	Dans la légende
"Tu sais pas"	2016	46	—	—	SNEP: Diamond	Dans la légende
"Bambina"	2016	58	—	—	SNEP: Diamond	Dans la légende
"Luz de Luna"	2016	67	—	—	SNEP: Diamond	Dans la légende
"Mira"	2016	71	—	—	SNEP: Diamond	Dans la légende
"Uranus"	2016	75	—	—	SNEP: Diamond	Dans la légende
"Kratos"	2016	82	—	—	SNEP: Platinum	Dans la légende
"Sheita"	2016	100	—	—	SNEP: Platinum	Dans la légende
"Autre monde"	2019	3	—	20	SNEP: Diamond	Deux frères
"Chang"	2019	5	—	—	SNEP: Diamond	Deux frères
"Hasta la vista"	2019	6	—	—	SNEP: Diamond	Deux frères
"Shenmue"	2019	7	—	—	SNEP: Diamond	Deux frères
"Celsius"	2019	8	—	—	SNEP: Platinum	Deux frères
"Zoulou tchaing"	2019	9	—	—	SNEP: Diamond	Deux frères
"Cœurs"	2019	10	—	—	SNEP: Diamond	Deux frères
"Menace"	2019	11	—	—	SNEP: Diamond	Deux frères
"91's"	2019	11	—	—	SNEP: Diamond	Deux frères
"Kuta ubud"	2019	12	—	—	SNEP: Diamond	Deux frères
"La misère est si belle"	2019	15	—	—	SNEP: Diamond	Deux frères
"Déconnecté"	2019	16	—	—	SNEP: Diamond	Deux frères
"Comme pas deux"	2019	25	—	—	SNEP: Diamond	Deux frères
"Ryuk"	2019	32	—	—	SNEP: Diamond	Deux frères
"Bang"	2019	36	—	—	SNEP: Platinum	Deux frères
"Sibérie"	2019	49	—	—	SNEP: Gold	Deux frères
"Capuche"	2019	178	—	—	SNEP: Platinum	Deux frères
"Frontières"	2019	148	—	—		Deux frères
"Cramés"	2019	114	—	—	SNEP: Gold	Dans la légende
"Je t'haine"	2019	194	—	—	SNEP: Gold	Dans la légende
"—" denotes a recording that did not chart or was not released in that territory.

== Music videos ==
List of music videos, showing year released and directors
Title	Year	Director(s)	Ref.
"Différents"	2014	Kamerameha	
"Je vis, je visser"	2014	Kamerameha	
"Gala Gala"	2014	N'Dirty Deh	
"La petite voix"	2014	Unknown	
"J'Comprends pas"	2015	Kamerameha	
"Simba"	2015	Kamerameha	
"PTQS (Plus Tony que Sosa)"	2015	Kamerameha	
"Le monde ou rien"	2015	Kamerameha	
"J'suis PNL"	2015	Kamerameha, Mess	
"Dans ta rue"	2015	Kamerameha, Mess	
"Oh Lala"	2015	Kamerameha	
"Tempête"	2016	Kamerameha, Mess	
"La vie est belle"	2016	Mess	
"DA"	2016	Kamerameha, Mess	
"J'suis QLF"	2016	Kamerameha, Mess	
"Naha"	2016	Mess	
"Onizuka"	2016	Mess	
"Béné"	2017	Kamerameha, Mess	
"Jusqu'au dernier gramme"	2017	Kamerameha, Mess	
"À l'ammoniaque"	2018	Kamerameha, Mess, Kim Chapiron	
"Au DD"	2019	QLF Records	
"Deux frères"	2019	QLF Records	
"Blanka"	2019	QLF Records	
