= List of number-one hits of 2018 (France) =

This is a list of the French SNEP Top 200 Singles and Top 200 Albums number-ones of 2018.

== Number ones by week ==
=== Singles chart ===
Week	Issue date	Download + Streaming		
Week	Issue date	Artist(s)	Title	Ref.
1	5 January	Ed Sheeran	"Perfect"	
2	12 January	Ed Sheeran	"Perfect"	
3	19 January	Camila Cabello featuring Young Thug	"Havana"	
4	26 January	Camila Cabello featuring Young Thug	"Havana"	
5	2 February	Vald	"Désaccordé"	
6	9 February	Vald	"Désaccordé"	
7	16 February	Vald	"Désaccordé"	
8	23 February	Vald	"Désaccordé"	
9	2 March	Vald	"Désaccordé"	
10	9 March	Vald	"Désaccordé"	
11	16 March	Vald	"Désaccordé"	
12	23 March	Lartiste featuring Caroliina	"Mafiosa"	
13	30 March	Maître Gims featuring Vianney	"La même"	
14	6 April	Lartiste featuring Caroliina	"Mafiosa"	
15	13 April	Lartiste featuring Caroliina	"Mafiosa"	
16	20 April	Lartiste featuring Caroliina	"Mafiosa"	
17	27 April	Lartiste featuring Caroliina	"Mafiosa"	
18	4 May	Damso	"Ipséité"	
19	11 May	Aya Nakamura	"Djadja"	
20	18 May	Aya Nakamura	"Djadja"	
21	25 May	Dosseh	"Habitué"	
22	31 May	Dosseh	"Habitué"	
23	7 June	Dosseh	"Habitué"	
24	14 June	Dosseh	"Habitué"	
25	21 June	Damso	"Smog"	
26	28 June	PNL	"À l'ammoniaque"	
27	5 July	PNL	"À l'ammoniaque"	
28	12 July	PNL	"À l'ammoniaque"	
29	19 July	Jul	"Toto et Ninetta"	
30	26 July	Vegedream	"Ramenez la coupe à la maison"	
31	3 August	Rim'K featuring Ninho	"Air Max"	
32	10 August	Rim'K featuring Ninho	"Air Max"	
33	17 August	PNL	"91's"	
34	24 August	PNL	"91's"	
35	31 August	PNL	"91's"	
36	7 September	Rim'K featuring Ninho	"Air Max"	
37	14 September	Vegedream	"Ramenez la coupe à la maison"	
38	21 September	Vegedream	"Ramenez la coupe à la maison"	
39	28 September	Vegedream	"Ramenez la coupe à la maison"	
40	5 October	Vegedream	"Ramenez la coupe à la maison"	
41	12 October	Dadju	"Jaloux"	
42	19 October	Dadju	"Jaloux"	
43	26 October	Dadju	"Jaloux"	
44	2 November	Dadju	"Jaloux"	
45	9 November	Aya Nakamura	"Copines"	
46	16 November	Dadju	"Jaloux"	
47	23 November	Orelsan featuring Damso	"Rêves bizarres"	
48	30 November	Orelsan featuring Damso	"Rêves bizarres"	
49	7 December	Maes featuring Booba	"Madrina"	
50	14 December	Lomepal	"Trop beau"	
51	21 December	Maes featuring Booba	"Madrina"	
52	28 December	Mariah Carey	"All I Want for Christmas Is You"	

=== Albums chart ===
Week	Issue date	Artist(s)	Album	Ref.
1	5 January	Booba	Trône	
2	12 January	Booba	Trône	
3	19 January	Booba	Trône	
4	26 January	Dadju	Gentleman 2.0	
5	2 February	Sofiane	Affranchis	
6	9 February	Vald	XEU	
7	16 February	Vald	XEU	
8	23 February	Vald	XEU	
9	2 March	Lorenzo	Rien à branler	
10	9 March	Eddy de Pretto	Cure	
11	16 March	Les Enfoirés	Les Enfoirés 2018: Musique!	
12	23 March	Les Enfoirés	Les Enfoirés 2018: Musique!	
13	30 March	Maître Gims	Ceinture noire	
14	6 April	Maître Gims	Ceinture noire	
15	13 April	Maître Gims	Ceinture noire	
16	20 April	Maître Gims	Ceinture noire	
17	27 April	Maître Gims	Ceinture noire	
18	4 May	Maître Gims	Ceinture noire	
19	11 May	Maître Gims	Ceinture noire	
20	18 May	Maître Gims	Ceinture noire	
21	25 May	Maître Gims	Ceinture noire	
22	31 May	Moha La Squale	Bendero	
23	7 June	Maître Gims	Ceinture noire	
24	14 June	Maître Gims	Ceinture noire	
25	21 June	Damso	Lithopédion	
26	28 June	Damso	Lithopédion	
27	5 July	Jul	Inspi d'ailleurs	
28	12 July	Jul	Inspi d'ailleurs	
29	19 July	Jul	Inspi d'ailleurs	
30	26 July	Jul	Inspi d'ailleurs	
31	3 August	Damso	Lithopédion	
32	10 August	Damso	Lithopédion	
33	17 August	Damso	Lithopédion	
34	24 August	Kids United Nouvelle Génération	Au bout de nos rêves	
35	31 August	Jain	Souldier	
36	7 September	Kendji Girac	Amigo	
37	14 September	Kendji Girac	Amigo	
38	21 September	Kendji Girac	Amigo	
39	28 September	RK	Insolent	
40	5 October	Mylène Farmer	Désobéissance	
41	12 October	Trois Cafés Gourmands	Un air de rien	
42	19 October	Trois Cafés Gourmands	Un air de rien	
43	26 October	Johnny Hallyday	Mon pays c'est l'amour	
44	2 November	Johnny Hallyday	Mon pays c'est l'amour	
45	9 November	Johnny Hallyday	Mon pays c'est l'amour	
46	16 November	Johnny Hallyday	Mon pays c'est l'amour	
47	23 November	Johnny Hallyday	Mon pays c'est l'amour	
48	30 November	Johnny Hallyday	Mon pays c'est l'amour	
49	7 December	Johnny Hallyday	Mon pays c'est l'amour	
50	14 December	Johnny Hallyday	Mon pays c'est l'amour	
51	21 December	Johnny Hallyday	Mon pays c'est l'amour	
52	28 December	Johnny Hallyday	Mon pays c'est l'amour	

== See also ==
- 2018 in music
- List of number-one singles in France
- List of top 10 singles in 2018 (France)
