= Lujipeka =

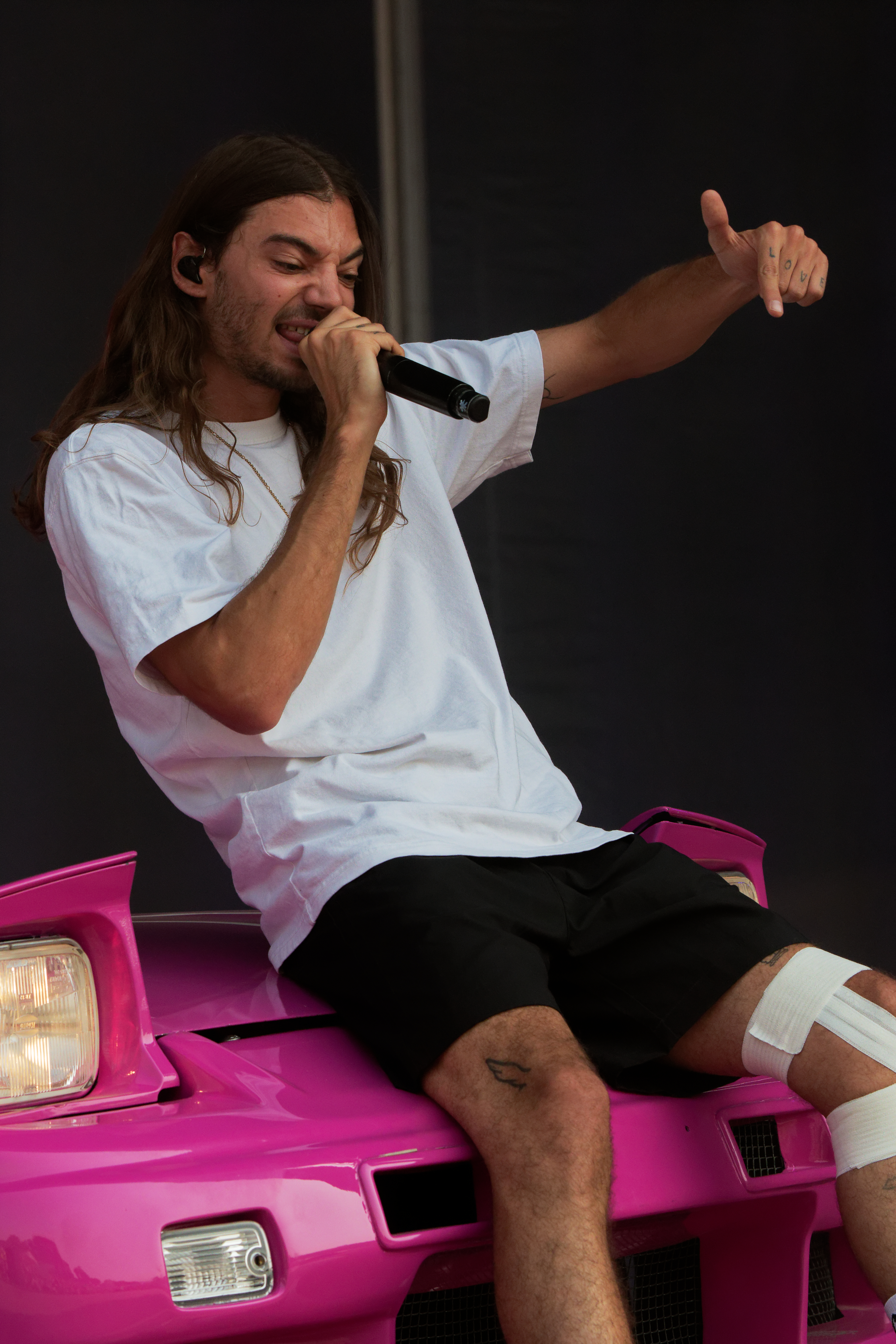
- Lujipeka at the Les Vieilles Charrues festival, 2022

Background information
- Also known as: Luji, Le Luj
- Born: Lucas Taupin; 9 September 1995 (age 31); Rennes, (France)
- Origin: French
- Genres: French rap, hip-hop
- Occupations: rapper, singer
- Instruments: Voice, guitar, ableton
- Years active: Since 2014
- Labels: VMS, Universal, SWA
- Member of: Columbine

Lujipeka, whose real name is Lucas Taupin, was born on September 9, 1995, in Rennes (Ille-et-Vilaine). He is a French rapper and singer. From 2014 to 2019, he was a member of the band Columbine. His first solo album, Montagnes Russes, was released on November 5, 2021.

== Biography ==
Lucas Taupin was born on September 9, 1995, in Rennes, in the department of Ille-et-Vilaine. He grew up in the HLM neighborhoods of Patton-La Bellangerais, and later in Quartier Sud-Gare.

At the age of 10 Lujipeka began taking guitar lessons. Starting at 14 years old, he took courses in computer-assisted music production. He attended Collège Jean-Moulin in Saint-Jacques-de-la-Lande, and later Lycée Bréquigny in the film studies program. After obtaining his baccalauréat and taking a gap year, he completed a two-year audiovisual production BTS (Brevet de Technicien Supérieur), specializing in audio production.

== Career ==
=== With the band Columbine ===
Lujipeka began his music journey with a group of friends he met in 2010 at high school, including Foda C, Sully, Yro, and Lorenzo. In 2015, they formed a collective first named VMS, then Columbine.

The band's inspiration ranges from the music of Odd Future to Boards of Canada, and films like White Trash, Gummo or Takeshi Kitano's movies. The collective is autonomous: Columbine produces its own videos, records its music, shoots its clips, and creates its own clothing collections.

They released their first EP in 2014 titled 2k16.

Clubbing for Columbine, their first fully self-produced album, was released in January 2016. The title references the documentary Bowling for Columbine by Michael Moore about the Columbine High School massacre. The eponymous single was certified gold two years after its release, in April 2018.

Columbine's second project, Enfants terribles, primarily produced by the duo Lujipeka/Foda C, was released in April 2017. It is their first release on their label VMS. The collective wanted "to make a more constructed, more accomplished album, without the same errors as the first one. We wanted to try rock and jazz sounds and create a more introspective project." The album debuted at the 8th position on France's Top Albums Chart in its first week of release. The group embarked on a national tour with about 40 dates starting in April 2017. They performed notably at La Maroquinerie on May 10 and at the Bataclan on November 25.

Together they released four albums, including their final album Adieu, Au revoir, which was certified double platinum. They completed five years of concerts and ended their tour at the Zénith in Paris.

In 2019 the group decided to split up. Lujipeka then launched his solo career.

=== Solo career ===
Lujipeka released his first solo track, titled Ahou, on December 12, 2019.

The release of his first project, an EP titled L.U.J.I.,' scheduled for March 27, 2020, was postponed to May 15 due to the COVID-19 pandemic. Wanting to maintain his participation in the Skyrock show Planète Rap without releasing tracks from his EP L.U.J.I. before its official release, he wrote another EP titled P.E.K.A. in a few days. Upon its release, the EP L.U.J.I. immediately reached the top of the album sales chart in France.

He released his song Putain d'époque in 2020, which was chosen for the closing credits of the show Quotidien. The track was thus broadcast repeatedly between January 11 and June 25, 2021. He was a guest on the same show and performed this title live on April 23, 2021.

In 2021 he appeared as a featured artist on the track Hades by Luv Resval.

His first album titled Montagnes Russes was released on November 5, 2021, and received excellent reviews. The magazine Télérama wrote: "Lujipeka reveals himself to be a fantastic interpreter, always slightly ahead of the rhythm and propelling each of his tracks with his slightly raspy voice over a background of reggae (Poupée russe), rock ballad (Juno), or just piano (Avant de dormir). His simple, precise writing is that of a true auteur." The album became platinum in November 2024.

From December 1 to 5, 2021, he was the chosen artist for the creation residency of Rencontres Trans Musicales in Rennes.

He released an EP titled LUJRADIO (Vol.1) with guests that he revealed live on Planète Rap (Luv Resval, Coyote Jo Bastard, Chanceko, Roshi, TK, and DMS).

In 2022 he filled the Olympia Hall in Paris and appeared in numerous French music festivals such as Printemps de Bourges, Francofolies in La Rochelle, Vieilles Charrues Festival in Carhaix-Plouguer, Europavox in Clermont-Ferrand, and Solidays in Paris. He won the Francophone Revelation of the Year award at the NRJ Music Awards 2022.

At the Victoires de la Musique 2022, Lujipeka, nominated as Male Revelation of the Year, performed his song Pas à ma place.

In February 2023 he re-released his first album Montagnes russes: menu XL, featuring 10 new tracks, including one with So La Lune. He appeared again on the show Quotidien, and played his new song Pour Toujours.

On March 31, 2023, he filled the Zénith in Paris, and the performance was later rebroadcast on France 4.

He appeared on Ben PLG's track Victor Oshimen.

In November 2023 he released the mixtape Week-end à Marseille with guests including Soprano, Stony Stone, Achim, Metah, Missan, Ben C, and TK. It features his single Ligue des Champions.

He also appeared on the track Tempête from Yaro's 2023 album and collaborated with Genezio on Raplume.

In 2024 he collaborated with Jey Brownie on the track Pas de remords and with Skary and Wysko on the track Le Silence et les Sirènes.

He was chosen to carry the Olympic flame in Rennes and gave a free concert in Rennes as part of the Coca-Cola Music Tour.

In 2025 he announced ticket sales for his Accor Arena concert scheduled for November 7, 2026, a new album Brûler Paris due to be released on October 3, 2025, and released two new tracks: Puzzle and Paulise.

He also organized the Puzzle Tour, a series of free concerts in various major cities such as Nantes, Bordeaux, Marseille, and Brussels.

== Solo ==
=== Studio albums ===
2021: Montagnes russes (Romance Musique – Universal Music France)
1. Poupée russe
2. Pas à ma place
3. 0.6
4. Bordel
5. L'autre univers
6. Hollywood
7. Plus jamais ça
8. Mempapeur (Interlude)
9. On ira (with Cerrone)
10. Putain d'époque
11. Juno
12. Le seum
13. 2 âmes
14. Éclipse
15. Avant de dormir
16. Oublier
17. Pas à ma place (with Lil Tooom)
2023: Montagnes russes: Menu XL (Romance Musique – Universal Music France)
1. Metaverse
2. Lala (with So La Lune)
3. Will Smith
4. J'ai perdu mon temps
5. BBRY (with Guy2Bezbar)
6. VDA
7. Iverson
8. Netflix (with Mayo)
9. Pour toujours
10. Et alors
11. Poupée russe
12. Pas à ma place
13. 0.6
14. Bordel
15. L'autre univers
16. Hollywood
17. Plus jamais ça
18. Mempapeur (Interlude)
19. On ira (with Cerrone)
20. Putain d'époque
21. Juno
22. Le seum
23. 2 âmes
24. Éclipse
25. Avant de dormir
26. Oublier

2025: BRULER PARIS

=== Mixtapes ===
2023: Weekend à Marseille (SWA)
1. Weekend à Marseille
2. Ligue des champions
3. Petite étoile (with Stony Stone)
4. Zaza
5. Drive By
6. Omega (with Achim)
7. Extendito
8. GoPro
9. Métallurgie (with Metah)
10. Interlude TK (with TK)
11. Albator (with Missan)
12. Toutou
13. Elon
14. Jusqu'à la folie (with Soprano)
15. Time (with BEN.C)
16. Ciel étoilé

=== EPs ===
2020: P.E.K.A (Initial Artist Services – Universal Music France)
1. La lune
2. Die
3. Roxanne
4. De quoi tu parles ?
5. Août 2008
2020: L.U.J.I (Initial Artist Services – Universal Music France)
1. Le soleil
2. Dans la Ciudad
3. Palapalaba
4. Ahou
5. Contaminé
6. Rampalapam
7. Lâche-moi la main (feat. Chaman, Chaps, Sully, Veskki & Yro)
8. Meme
9. Refrain
10. La Lune
11. Die
12. Roxanne
13. De quoi tu parles ?
14. Août 2008
15. Booska Ozone
2022: LUJRADIO (Vol. 1) (Initial Artist Services – Universal Music France)
1. Épilogue (feat. Luv Resval)
2. Mon Poto (feat. Coyote Jo Bastard)
3. Blizzard (feat. Chanceko)
4. Rythme infernal (feat. Roshi)
5. HSBC (feat. TK)
6. S.O.S. (feat. DMS)

=== Singles ===
- 2019: Ahou
- 2020: Palapalaba
- 2020: Lâche-moi la main (feat. Columbine)
- 2020: Meme
- 2020: Putain d'époque
- 2021: Putain d'époque (feat. S.Pri Noir)
- 2021: Éclipse
- 2021: Poupée russe (Platinum record)
- 2021: Pas à ma place (Gold record)
- 2021: Mempapeur (Interlude)
- 2021: 0.6
- 2022: Épilogue (feat. Luv Resval)
- 2022: HSBC (feat. TK)
- 2022: Metaverse
- 2022: VDA
- 2023: Lala (feat. So La Lune)
- 2023: Pour toujours
- 2023: BBRY (feat. Guy2Bezbar)
- 2023: Ligue des champions
- 2023: Zaza
- 2025: Brûler Paris
- 2025: Puzzle
- 2025: Paulise

== With Columbine ==
=== Studio albums ===
- 2016: Clubbing for Columbine
- 2017: Enfants terribles
- 2018: Adieu bientôt

=== EPs ===
- 2014: 2k16

== Awards ==
- NRJ Music Awards 2022: Francophone revelation of the year
- Victoires de la Musique 2023: Nomination in the category male revelation of the year
- NRJ Music Awards 2023: Nomination in the category Tournée francophone de l’année
