= Columbine (band) =

French musical group

- Also known as: VMS
- Origin: France
- Genres: Rap, Emo rap, Cloud rap
- Years active: 2014-2019
- Labels: Columbine2k16, VMS, Initial Artist Services
- Members: Lujipeka, Foda C, Chaman et Sully, Veskki, Yro, Lorenzo, Chaps
- Website: columbine.store

Columbine is a French rap collective from Rennes, Brittany active between 2014 and 2019. The main members were Lujipeka, Foda C, Yro, Chaps, KCIV, Chaman and Sully, Veskki, and Larry Garcia (Lorenzo in his solo career).

The group released four albums: Clubbing for Columbine in 2016, Enfants terribles in 2017, Adieu bientôt in 2018, and Adieu, au revoir in 2019.

== History ==
=== Formation and debut ===
The founding members of the collective met in 2010 in the same class at Bréquigny High School in Rennes.

They chose the group name "Columbine" in reference to the school shooting that occurred in 1999 at Columbine High School in the United States. The group did not intend to honor or defend the crime, but rather used the massacre and its perpetrators as a symbol of marginalized and misunderstood youth.

Defining themselves primarily as a "bunch of friends," the crew included Foda C, Lujipeka, their friend and roommate Lorenzo (alias Larry Garcia), Sully, Chaman, Yro, Chaps, and Sacha (alias Veskki). They were later joined by their DJ KCIV. The first group formed by the members of Columbine was VMS.

The inspiration for the group's members ranges from music by Odd Future to Boards of Canada and cinema like White Trash Gummo or the films of Takeshi Kitano. The collective is autonomous: Columbine produces its own videos, records its music, films its clips, and creates its own clothing collections.

They released their first video, Charles-Vicomte, in August 2014, which features a satirical character of a bourgeois rapper played by Yro. This track is part of the group's first self-produced EP, 2k16, which consists only of solo pieces by Lujipeka, Foda C, and Yro (2014).

=== Clubbing for Columbine (2016) ===
Clubbing for Columbine, their first entirely self-produced project, was released in January 2016. Its title is a reference to the documentary Bowling for Columbine by Michael Moore, which focuses on the Columbine High School massacre. The single this was based on, Les Prélis was certified gold two years after its release, in April 2018.

According to Foda C, Columbine's rap "reflects our generation. We talked about adolescence because that was what we were living through. We saw ourselves as outsiders, the troubled kids of high school." Despite some lighter tracks, Columbine emphasizes the seriousness of their approach: "Through the collective, we want to promote individual talents. We have a sense of humor, but we are serious about what we do."

=== Enfants terribles (2017) ===
Columbine's second project, Enfants terribles, primarily produced by the duo Lujipeka/Foda C, was released in April 2017. This was their first release on the label Initial Artist Services. The collective aimed to "create a more structured, more polished album without the same mistakes as the first one [...] We wanted to experiment with rock and jazz sounds, and create a more introspective project."

For Technikart, "Enfants terribles by Columbine is completely on the margins of what's currently being released, peripheral but also above it. It's depressing and contemplative, combative and twisted. The production is filled with ideas, the lyrics are full of gems, and the vocals are truly bizarre and inventive." Les Inrockuptibles notes that "today, more confident, the group sets aside the jokes for a more thoughtful and much richer writing."

The album debuted at 8th place on the France Top Albums chart and 44th on the Belgium Wallonia Top Album chart during its release week. The group embarked on a national tour of around forty dates starting in April 2017, including performances at La Maroquinerie on May 10 and the Bataclan on November 25th.

In early August 2017, Lujipeka and Chaps released a new single: Pierre feuille papier ciseaux, their first track to be certified platinum.

The album was certified gold in December 2017, a certification "burned" by the group members according to Lujipeka's lyrics in their song Rémi ("Gold disc, we'll melt it"), and later certified platinum in January 2021.

=== Adieu Bientôt and Adieu, au revoir ===
Columbine's penultimate album, titled Adieu bientôt, was released on September 28, 2018, under their own label VMS and Initial Artist Services.

Adieu bientôt features solo tracks by Foda C, solos by Lujipeka, and duos by Lujipeka-Foda C. Other tracks include Chaman (Teen Spirit, Brûler) and Sully (Labo Photo). The album is produced by Seezy, Junior Alaprod, and Ponko. The compositions are credited both to Foda and Luji as well as the group's affiliated composers heard on Enfants Terribles: Skuna, Kiyane, Saavane, KCIV (their DJ), and various type beats found on the internet and reworked. Lujipeka samples Étienne Daho's Les Flocons de l'été for the track Puzzle.

The album was preceded by the release of the single Cache-cache in the summer of the same year, followed on September 7 by the album's eponymous track as a single. From September 10 to 15, the collective was invited to the Planète Rap show on Skyrock. This provided an opportunity to perform several exclusive live tracks from the album: Borderline, La Gloire ou l'Asile, and Âge d'or.

The album was certified gold in November 2018 and then platinum in May 2019.

On March 4, 2019, Columbine announced a reissue of Adieu bientôt titled Adieu, au revoir, which includes ten new tracks composed during the Adieu Bientôt tour and performed by Lujipeka and Foda C. Initially scheduled for April 5, the reissue was postponed to April 19 to avoid coinciding with PNL's album Deux frères. The reissue Adieu, au revoir was certified double platinum on May 27, 2021.

=== Separation of the band ===
Lujipeka announced in an interview for Interlude on July 20, 2021, that the group would no longer release any projects.

Foda C confirmed on April 20, 2023, that he is moving on to new projects and revealed the release of a first-person shooter game named Unrecord.

Each member is now pursuing a solo career.

== Discography ==
=== EPs ===
- 2014: 2k16

=== Studio albums ===
- 2016: Clubbing for Columbine
- 2017: Enfants terribles
- 2018: Adieu bientôt
- 2019: Adieu, au revoir

=== Singles ===
- 2015: Mandragore
- 2015: Dom Pérignon
- 2015: Fleurs du mal
- 2016: Les Prélis
- 2017: Enfants terribles
- 2017: Rémi
- 2017: Temps électrique
- 2017: Talkie-walkie
- 2017: Pierre, feuille, papier, ciseaux
- 2018: Cache-Cache
- 2018: Adieu bientôt
- 2019: Borderline
- 2019: C'est pas grave

== Band members ==
- Lujipeka
- Foda C
- Chaman
- Sully
- Yro
- Lorenzo
- Veskki
- Chaps
- KCIV
