= DTF =

DTF may refer to:

== Arts and entertainment ==
- DTF (rap duo), French duo
- "D T F", a song by Adore Delano from the 2014 album Till Death Do Us Party

== Technology ==
- Digital Tape Format, for magnetic tape storage
- Define the File, DOS macros
- Direct-to-film printing, on non-paper substrates
- Dynamic Track Following, in Video 2000 videotapes

== Other uses ==
- Department of Treasury and Finance (South Australia), Australia
- Department of Treasury and Finance (Victoria), Australia
- Directed Transfer Function, in neurology, based on the Granger causality principle
- Downtown Fullerton, California, US
