= DTF (duo) =

French rap band

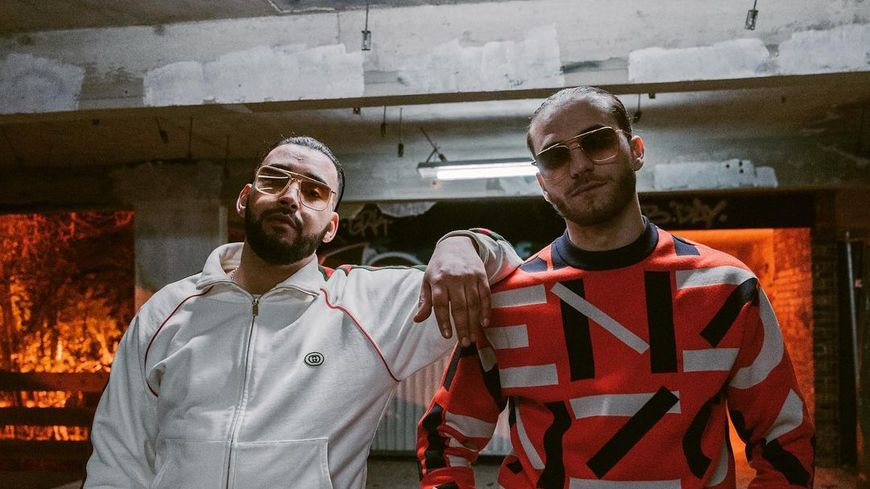
- DTF RKM et RTI

Background information
- Origin: Cité Gagarine, Ivry-sur-Seine, France
- Genre: Cloud rap
- Years active: 2015–present
- Labels: QLF Records; Musicast; Believe
- Members: RKM; RTI

DTF (acronym for Dans Ta Face, translates into "In Your Face") is a French rap duo consisting of RKM (born Karim Azzouz) and RTI (born Samy Taourirt).

== History ==
=== Early life and beginnings ===
Samy and Karim are from the Cité Gagarine district of Ivry-sur-Seine. They started rapping with a few friends from the neighborhood and Karim's cousins: Tarik and Nabil Andrieu brothers, who later formed the PNL. Karim has appeared on PNL's 2015 mixtape, Que la famille and 2015 album, Le Monde Chico.

=== Formation and breakthrough ===
Formed in 2015, they made their debut with the release of an extended play (EP) titled Le H avant le B. In 2016, the duo released its first album La hass avant le bonheur, followed by the second, Sans rêve in the next year. In 2017, the duo was selected as one of the opening acts for PNL's six-city tour in France.

In 2019, DTF released its third album On ira où ?, which has peaked at number four in the French albums chart. For the promotion of the album, the duo gave its first television interview to Mouloud Achour's Canal+ show Clique.

== Discography ==
=== Studio albums ===
List of studio albums, with selected details and chart positions
Title	Details	Peak chart positions			
Title	Details	FRA	BEL (Fl)	BEL (Wa)	SWI
La hass avant le bonheur	Released: March 18, 2016; Label: QLF, Musicast, Believe; Format: CD, digital download, streaming	71	—	72	—
Sans rêve	Released: May 19, 2017; Label: QLF, Musicast, Believe; Format: CD, digital download, streaming	6	—	38	68
On ira où ?	Released: October 11, 2019; Label: QLF, Musicast, Believe; Format: CD, digital download, streaming	4	139	6	19
Double Star	Released: June 4, 2021; Label: QLF, Believe; Format: CD, digital download, streaming	3	—	8	13
Karma	Released: 10 February 2023; Label: QLF, Musicast, Believe; Format: CD, digital download, streaming	6	—	14	7

=== Extended plays ===
List of extended plays (EP), with selected details
Title	Details
Le H avant le B	Released: September 30, 2015; Label: QLF, Musicast, Believe; Format: CD, digital download, streaming

=== Singles ===
Title	Year	Peak chart positions		Album
Title	Year	FRA	BEL (Fl)	Album
"Moi ça m'ira"	2018	156	—	Non-album release
"Me gusta"	2019	56	—	On ira où?
"Veni qui"	2019	69	41 (Ultratip*)	On ira où?

=== Other charting songs ===
Title	Year	Peak chart positions		Album
Title	Year	FRA	BEL (Fl)	Album
"Comme tu veux"	2016	—	—	
"100 rêves"	2017	82	35 (Ultratip*)	Sans rêve
"Avant de partir" (feat. N.O.S.)	2017	88	—	Sans rêve
"Le ciel est la limite"	2017	131	—	Sans rêve
"Allô le monde"	2017	149	—	Sans rêve
"Dans mon nuage"	2017	159	—	Sans rêve
"Comme un fou"	2017	182	—	Sans rêve
"J'abuse"	2017	193	—	Sans rêve
"Dans la ville"	2019	21	18 (Ultratip*)	On ira où?
"Atlas"	2019	72	—	On ira où?
"Trou de boulette"	2019	81	—	On ira où?
"Funky Drugs"	2019	85	—	On ira où?
"J'hésite"	2019	112	—	On ira où?
"Wey"	2019	118	—	On ira où?
"Mon amos"	2019	121	—	On ira où?
"On ira où?"	2019	124	—	On ira où?
"Kira"	2019	131	—	On ira où?
"Dans la zone"	2019	136	—	On ira où?
"La base"	2019	140	—	On ira où?
"Coco"	2019	144	—	On ira où?
"Kush"	2019	146	—	On ira où?
"Wesh la rue"	2019	167	—	On ira où?
"Biko"	2019	169	—	On ira où?
"Dans la savane"	2021	47	—	Double Star
"Boyz"	2021	89	—	Double Star
"Jusqu'ici tout va bien"	2021	114	—	Double Star
"Dans ma fonce"	2021	120	—	Double Star
"Je vois"	2021	124	—	Double Star
"Avec le cœur"	2021	146	—	Double Star
"Black Moon"	2021	154	—	Double Star
"Business Now"	2021	155	—	Double Star
"S'en aller"	2021	178	—	Double Star
"Sauvage"	2021	181	—	Double Star
"Pas le choix"	2021	192	—	Double Star
