= Kornit Digital =

Israeli printer manufacturer

Kornit Digital Ltd.
- Type: Public
- Traded as: Nasdaq: KRNT
- Industry: Printing
- Founded: 2002; 24 years ago
- Headquarters: Rosh HaAyin (global); Englewood, U.S. (Corporate)
- Products: Direct to garment printers; KornitX print-on-demand fulfillment platform
- Revenue: ▲US$ 208.2 million (2025)
- Operating income: ▼US$ 34.6 million (2025)
- Net income: ▼US$ 13.5 million (2025)
- Number of employees: 700+ (2025)
- Website: kornit.com

Kornit Digital Ltd. is an Israeli-American international manufacturing company. It produces high-speed industrial inkjet printers, pigmented ink and chemical products for the garment and apparel, home goods, textile accessories and decorating industry.

== History ==
The company was founded in 2002 in Magshimim, Israel by a team that previously worked in the digital printing field, at companies such as Scitex and Hewlett-Packard. The company uses the same technology used in digital printing and has applied it to digital textile printing, which has developed more slowly than the field of digital printing.

In 2015, Kornit Digital went public.

In October 2018, Kornit Digital Americas Headquarters and Demo Center opened in Englewood, New Jersey.

In August 2020, Kornit Digital announced the acquisition of UK-based global software firm Custom Gateway.

In August 2021, Kornit Digital announced the acquisition of a Massachusetts based multi-material footwear manufacturer Voxel8.

In 2022, Kornit Digital announced the acquisition of Lichtenau, Germany-based Tesoma manufacturer of textile curing solutions.

In 2026, Kornit Digital announced the acquisition of PrintFactory, a Netherlands-based provider of cloud-native workflow and production automation software.

== Products and technologies ==
Kornit Digital sells direct-to-garment printers of different varieties. Its printers include RIP software customized to each machine.

Kornit's machines use a pre-treatment wetting process that is integrated into the printer, which it calls The PreT System. This enables printing on the garment without manual pre-treatment, by applying a fixation agent automatically on press, immediately prior to the print process. This process makes wet-on-wet printing possible.

The company also provides a process that enables printing on dark garments. This process includes coating finished garments with a white coat of ink created from patented inks formed from CMYK. Kornit's ink plant in Kiryat Gat produces CMYK and white ink for its customers. In 2015, Kornit patented NeoPigment Ink.

Kornit systems with a "Hexa" or "HD6" designation (now discontinued and replaced with Atlas MAX) supplemented CMYK with primary red and green inks for increased color gamut.

Kornit markets its systems as a sustainable alternative to screen printing, dye sublimation, reactive dyes, and other textile print methods; the company's inks have received Oeko-Tex approval in the industry.

In 2019 Kornit released Avalanche Poly Pro, the first digital direct-to-garment print system developed specifically for polyester and poly-blend fabrics, as well as the Presto, a successor to Allegro for the roll-to-roll direct-to-fabric print market. Avalanche Poly Pro was later named "Best Direct-to-Garment Print System" by the European Digital Press Association.

In 2021, Kornit released Presto Max, a next-generation direct-to-fabric printing system designed for single-step, eco-friendly textile production. The Presto MAX was the first digital printer to enable white printing on colored fabrics and support neon colors, while being compatible with natural fabrics, synthetics, and blends. It also incorporated Kornit's XDi technology for 3D decorative applications.

In 2023, Kornit Digital introduced two new systems: the Apollo platform and the Atlas MAX Plus. The Apollo platform was designed for high-volume, single-step digital garment decoration, capable of processing up to 400 garments per hour. The Atlas MAX Plus, designed specifically for industrial production, extended Kornit’s previous Atlas MAX line.

In 2026, Kornit Digital released the Atlas MATRIX, a unified digital production system that combines direct-to-garment, direct-to-polyester, and direct-to-film capabilities in a single-step workflow.

== Corporate affairs ==
=== Leadership ===
Ofer Ben Zur was Kornit CEO from its founding in 2002 until 2014, when he was succeeded by Gabi Seligsohn; Ben Zur remained as Chief Technology Officer. Ronen Samuel, formerly of HP Indigo, succeeded Seligsohn as CEO in June of 2018.

=== Locations ===
Kornit Digital's global headquarters are located in Rosh HaAyin, Israel.

Kornit Digital's Asia-Pacific operations (KDAP) are based in Kowloon City, Hong Kong and Shanghai, China. Ilan Elad is KDAP President.

Kornit Digital's Europe operations (KDEU) are based in Düsseldorf, Germany. Chris Govier is KDEU Managing Director.

Kornit Digital's Americas operations (KDAM) are based in Englewood, New Jersey, USA. Ilan Elad is KDAM President.

== Awards ==
In 2024, Kornit Digital's Apollo received a PRINTING United Alliance Pinnacle Technology Award.

In 2026, Kornit Digital's Atlas MATRIX received a PRINTING United Alliance Pinnacle Technology Award.
