= Tiitof =

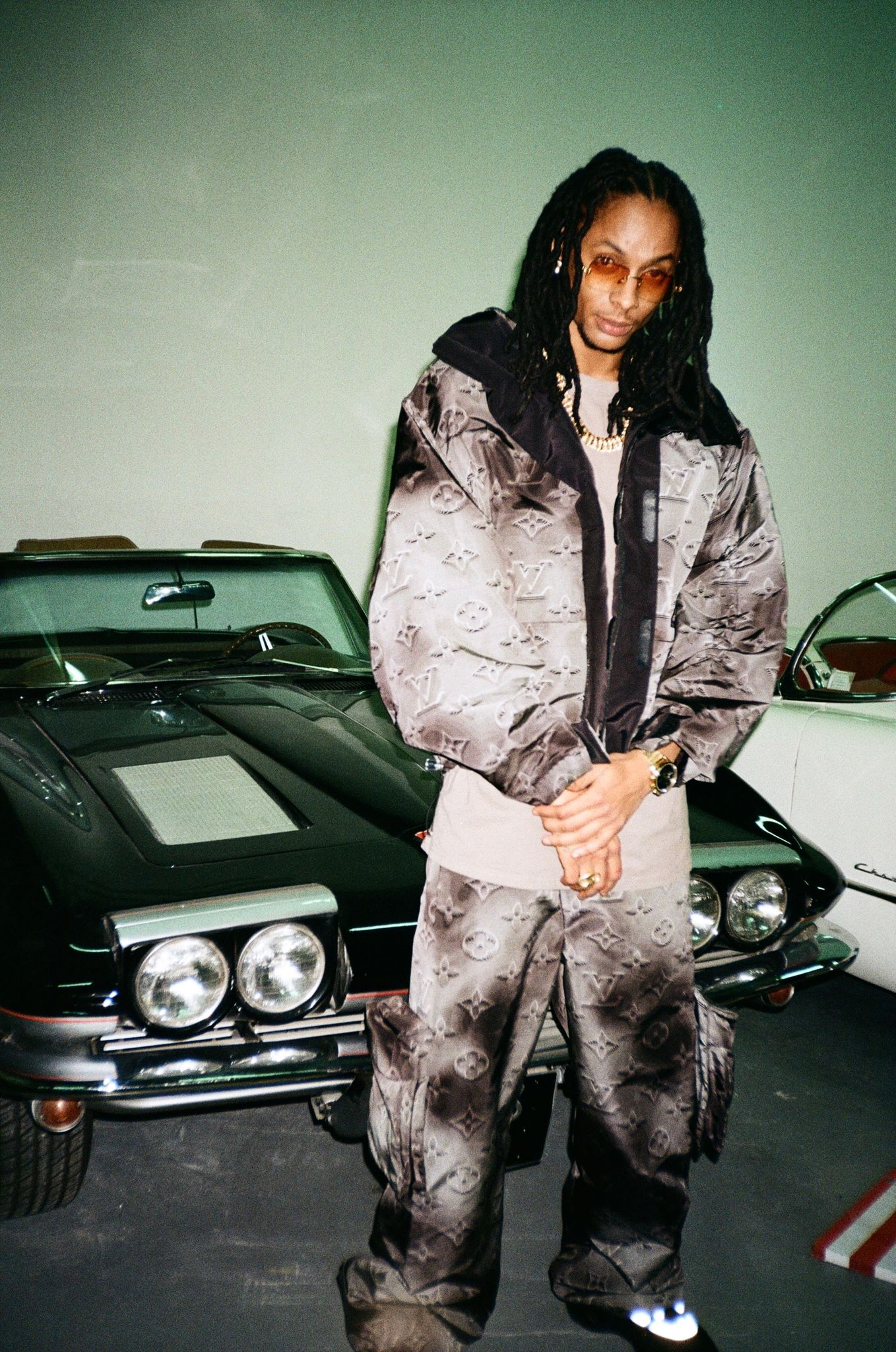

Background information
- Born: 19 September 1995 (age 30)
- Genres: Hip hop; trap
- Occupations: Rapper; singer; songwriter
- Years active: 2016–present
- Labels: 300 Records; All Point

Willem Lacom, known by his stage name Tiitof was born on 19 September 1995 in Fort-de-France, is a French rapper.

== Biography ==
Originally from the working-class neighbourhood of Morne-Calbasse in Fort-de-France, he started singing at the age of 11 with a cousin and a friend. In 2016, he flew to France where he met his manager and worked with him on his first tracks, including the mixtape #YDD Young Drugs Dealers, which he published on the SoundCloud platform. His first video Pa Tou Sel was critically acclaimed and encouraged him to pursue music. In 2017, he released his first album called St. Patrick.

In June 2018, his second album Minuit allowed him to get a little more visibility on the national scene. Then in July of the following year he signed to the Believe label.

In February 2020, he was the guest of the singer Meryl in Planète Rap, together with his host he improvised the freestyle Pas longtemps which was a hit on his album Tout à Gagner, released on 10 April 2020. The album features artists such as Hornet La Frappe, Landy, Kodes and Jacob Desvarieux.

In July 2020, he was invited to collaborate on Kalash's track Plus de love.

In March 2021, after numerous appearances, he was back on Planète Rap with Meryl, but this time invited by the singer Hatik for the release of his album Vague à l'âme, on which he appears as a guest on the track Maman qui pleure.

On 26 November 2021, he released his fourth album Bénéfice in which he added new collaborations with French rap artists such as PLK, RK and Zkr.

== Discography ==
=== Albums ===
- 2017 : St Patrick (Enjoy Good Music)
- 2018 : Minuit (Enjoy Good Music)
- 2020 : Tout à gagner (300Rec / Allpoints)
- 2021 : Bénéfice (300Rec / Allpoints)

== Awards ==
In 2019, at the 7th Hit Lokal Awards, he won the Best Male Newcomer Award for his song Minuit.

== Concerts ==
On 13 September 2021, the artist performed at the Institut du Monde Arabe for the Arte channel's Les Concerts Volants. Other dates are in the future, notably his first concert at La Cigale, initially scheduled for 3 October 2021 but following the COVID-19 pandemic will be postponed to 16 May 2022.
