= Gagarine =

2020 French film

- Directed by: Fanny Liatard; Jérémy Trouilh
- Written by: Fanny Liatard; Jérémy Trouilh; Benjamin Charbit
- Produced by: Julie Billy; Carole Scotta
- Starring: Alséni Bathily; Lyna Khoudri; Jamil McCraven; Finnegan Oldfield; Farida Rahouadj; Denis Lavant
- Cinematography: Victor Seguin
- Edited by: Daniel Darmon
- Music by: Evgueni and Sacha Galperine; Amine Bouhafa
- Production company: Haut et Court
- Distributed by: Haut et Court
- Release dates: 26 September 2020 (Zurich Film Festival); 23 June 2021 (France)
- Running time: 97 minutes
- Country: France
- Language: French
- Box office: $553,042

Gagarine, also known as Gagarin, is a 2020 French drama film directed by Fanny Liatard and Jérémy Trouilh, in their feature directorial debut. It centres around Cité Gagarine, a housing project in Ivry-sur-Seine, on the south of Paris, where the film was shot right before its demolition.

The film was selected for the 2020 Cannes Film Festival. It was nominated for the European Discovery at the 33rd European Film Awards.

== Synopsis ==
Youri, a 16-year-old boy living in Cité Gagarine, a housing project in Ivry-sur-Seine, protests the planned demolition of the community.

Youri and his friends are unable to stop building inspectors from closing the estate despite painting over graffiti and changing lightbulbs.

Youri's mother inititially agrees that he will live with her but changes her mind, informing him via note that it will be too 'difficult' with her pregnancy and new boyfriend. Youri remains behind, building a spaceship-inspired dwelling, hidden from security guards and workers. He grows vegetables with a greenhouse and he and Diana become romantically involved.

Diana, who is Roma, lives nearby but is forced to relocate with her family when the police evict them from their mobile homes. Youri asks her to stay with him but she leaves with her family.

On the evening of the demolition, old residents return to lay flowers and watch the demolition. After seeing lights in the buildings flash SOS in Morse Code, Diana and Houssam rush in to find Youri unconscious with hypothermia on the roof of his block.

== Cast ==
- Alséni Bathily as Youri
- Lyna Khoudri as Diana
- Jamil McCraven as Houssam
- Finnegan Oldfield as Dali
- Farida Rahouadj as Fari
- Denis Lavant as Gérard

== Production ==
Gagarine is an expansion of the directors' 2015 short of the same name, their first film. They first interviewed residents of Cité Gagarine at the request of architects who were studying the possible demolition of the building, which inspired them to write a fictional film set in the project.

== Release ==
Gagarine was included in the First Features section of the official selection of the 2020 Cannes Film Festival, which was cancelled due to the COVID-19 pandemic. It was screened for press and industry in an online edition of the Cannes Marché du Film in June 2020. It was subsequently screened at the Zurich Film Festival on 26 September 2020. It was first theatrically released in France on 23 June 2021.

== Reception ==
=== Box office ===
Gagarine has grossed a worldwide total of $553,042.

=== Critical response ===
On review aggregator Rotten Tomatoes, the film holds an approval rating of 96% based on 44 reviews, with an average rating of 7.8/10. The website's critics consensus reads, "Balancing whimsy-tinged magic realism against serious themes of community and displacement, Gagarine is as bracingly original as it is ultimately poignant." On Metacritic, the film holds a score of 74 out of 100, based on 12 critics, indicating "generally favorable reviews".
