= Au DD =

2019 single by PNL

Single by PNL

from the album Deux frères
- Released: 22 March 2019
- Recorded: 2018
- Length: 4:07
- Label: QLF
- Songwriters: Tarik Andrieu; Nabil Andrieu
- Producer: TrackBeatz

PNL singles chronology
"91's" (2018)	"Au DD" (2019)	"Deux frères" (2019)

Music video
- "Au DD" on YouTube

"Au DD" (pronounced [o de de]) is a song by French rap band PNL. It was released on 22 March 2019 as the third single from their third studio album Deux frères. The song peaked atop the charts of France and Belgium.

== Background and release ==
Through 2018, PNL released two singles, "À l'ammoniaque" and "91's", both have reached number one on the French chart. "Au DD" was released on 22 March 2019, along with the announcement of the duo's third studio album, Deux frères. The album was released on 5 April 2019, with "Au DD" serving as its third single.

== Music video ==
The accompanying music video was filmed in December 2018 in Paris at the Eiffel Tower, becoming the first duo or band to film a video on the tower. In the midnight of 22 March 2019, the duo launched a livestream on its YouTube channel showing the Earth spinning. At 4 p.m., it was announced that the video will be released at 8 p.m. The video features the two brothers performing the song at the top of the tower, wearing a jacket that had been specially designed by Virgil Abloh for the occasion. The video was well received by the music critics, with The Guardian editor Iman Amrani writing: "In the vertigo-inducing clip, they turn the structure into a trap house, making it resemble the lifts at the bottom of the estates where drug dealers set up shop". Dummy magazine's editor Felicity Marting wrote that it "fit[s] the duo’s cloud rap sonics perfectly".

In December 2019, the video had more than 129 million views, making it the most viewed video of the year on YouTube in France. In 2020, it won the category for Best Music Video at the Victoires de la Musique Awards.

== Charts ==
=== Weekly charts ===
Chart performance for "Au DD"
Chart (2019)	Peak position
Belgium (Ultratop 50 Wallonia)	1
France (SNEP)	1
Switzerland (Schweizer Hitparade)	2

=== Year-end charts ===
Year-end chart performance for "Au DD"
Chart (2019)	Position
Belgium (Ultratop Wallonia)	29
France (SNEP)	2
Switzerland (Schweizer Hitparade)	82
Chart (2020)	Position
France (SNEP)	116

== Certifications ==
Certifications for "Au DD"
Region	Certification	Certified units/sales
Belgium (BRMA)	Platinum	40,000^{‡}
France (SNEP)	Diamond	333,333^{‡}
^{‡} Sales+streaming figures based on certification alone.
