= Dans la légende =

Studio album by PNL
- Released: 16 September 2016
- Length: 66:30
- Label: QLF

PNL chronology
Le Monde Chico (2015)	Dans la légende (2016)	Deux frères (2019)

Singles from Dans la légende
- 1. "La vie est belle" Released: 11 March 2016; 2. "DA" Released: 15 April 2016; 3. "J'suis QLF" Released: 15 July 2016; 4. "Naha" Released: 15 September 2016; 5. "Onizuka" Released: 4 November 2016; 6. "Bené" Released: 10 February 2017; 7. "Jusqu'au dernier gramme" Released: 7 July 2017

Dans la légende (pronounced [dɑ̃ la leʒɑ̃d]) is the second studio album by the French cloud rap band PNL. It was released on 16 September 2016 through the duo's own QLF Records. The album was preceded by the singles "La vie est belle", "DA", "J'suis QLF", "Naha", "Onizuka", "Bené" and "Jusqu'au dernier gramme".

== Promotion ==
To promote the album, PNL went on a six-city tour in France through 2017. In July 2020, the duo released an hour long tour documentary on Netflix France from the tour.

== Track listing ==
Dans la légende track listing
No.	Title	Producer(s)	Length
1.	"DA"	Soulayman Beats	3:50
2.	"Naha"	BBP	4:45
3.	"Dans la légende"	Nk.F	3:54
4.	"Mira"	Baille Broliker	3:35
5.	"J'suis QLF"	MKSB	4:28
6.	"La vie est belle"	Kozanostra	3:53
7.	"Kratos"	Iksma Riddim	3:36
8.	"Luz de Luna"	Nk.F	4:04
9.	"Tu sais pas"	Nk.F	3:31
10.	"Sheita"	Iksma Riddim	4:16
11.	"Humain"	Iksma Riddim	4:38
12.	"Bambina"	BBP	4:46
13.	"Bené"	Vice Beats	3:10
14.	"Uranus"	Nk.F	4:00
15.	"Onizuka"	BBP & Dolor	4:12
16.	"Jusqu'au dernier gramme"	YannDakta & Rednose	5:52
Total length:			66:30

Version Orange (Orange Version) bonus track
No.	Title	Producer	Length
17.	"Je t'haine"	BBP	5:14
Total length:			71:44

Version Rose (Pink Version) bonus track
No.	Title	Producer	Length
17.	"Cramés"	Imagbox Beats	4:02
Total length:			70:32

== Charts ==
=== Weekly charts ===
Chart (2016)	Peak position
Belgian Albums (Ultratop Flanders)	39
Belgian Albums (Ultratop Wallonia)	1
Canadian Albums (Billboard)	86
Dutch Albums (Album Top 100)	75
French Albums (SNEP)	1
Spanish Albums (Promusicae)	94
Swiss Albums (Schweizer Hitparade)	1

=== Year-end charts ===
Chart (2016)	Position
Belgian Albums (Ultratop Wallonia)	24
French Albums (SNEP)	8
Swiss Albums (Schweizer Hitparade)	79
Chart (2017)	Position
Belgian Albums (Ultratop Wallonia)	46
French Albums (SNEP)	7
Chart (2018)	Position
Belgian Albums (Ultratop Wallonia)	63
Chart (2019)	Position
Belgian Albums (Ultratop Wallonia)	49
Chart (2020)	Position
Belgian Albums (Ultratop Wallonia)	32
Chart (2021)	Position
Belgian Albums (Ultratop Wallonia)	30
Chart (2022)	Position
Belgian Albums (Ultratop Wallonia)	11
Chart (2023)	Position
Belgian Albums (Ultratop Wallonia)	13
Swiss Albums (Schweizer Hitparade)	92
Chart (2024)	Position
Belgian Albums (Ultratop Wallonia)	13
Chart (2025)	Position
Belgian Albums (Ultratop Wallonia)	11

== Certifications ==
Region	Certification	Certified units/sales
Belgium (BRMA)	Gold	15,000^{‡}
France (SNEP)	3× Diamond	1,500,000^{‡}
^{‡} Sales+streaming figures based on certification alone.
