= Le Monde Chico =

Studio album by PNL
- Released: 30 October 2015
- Genre: Cloud rap
- Length: 70:13
- Label: QLF

PNL chronology
Que la famille (2015)	Le Monde Chico (2015)	Dans la légende (2016)

Singles from Le Monde Chico
- 1. "PTQS (Plus Tony que Sosa)" Released: 8 May 2015; 2. "Le monde ou rien" Released: 12 June 2015; 3. "J'suis PNL" Released: 31 July 2015; 4. "Dans ta rue" Released: 18 September 2015; 5. "Oh lala" Released: 23 October 2015; 6. "Tempête" Released: 1 January 2016

Le Monde Chico is the debut studio album by French cloud rap duo PNL. It was released on 30 October 2015 through the duo's own QLF Records. The album was preceded by the singles "Plus Tony que Sosa", "Le monde ou rien", "J'suis PNL", "Dans ta rue", "Oh lala" and "Tempête".

== Track listing ==
Le Monde Chico track listing
No.	Title	Producer(s)	Length
1.	"Le monde ou rien"	MKSB	4:16
2.	"Sur Paname"	Artem	4:07
3.	"Oh lala"	King Doudou	4:07
4.	"J'vends"	Nine Diamond	3:50
5.	"Abonné"	Prodlem	3:37
6.	"J'suis PNL"	MKSB	4:31
7.	"Mexico"	DzonyBeatz	4:05
8.	"Porte de Mesrine"	48 Laws & SuperstaarBeats	4:51
9.	"Dans ta rue"	King Doudou	5:29
10.	"Laisse"		3:43
11.	"Loin des hommes"	Citizen.K	2:48
12.	"Le M"	Adsa Beatz	4:09
13.	"Rebenga" (featuring RKM)	Kevin Mabz	4:20
14.	"PTQS (Plus Tony que Sosa)"	ShinoX Mker	4:18
15.	"Que la mif" (featuring S-PION, Pti Moha, F430 and Ilinas)	Adsa Beatz	4:23
16.	"Tempête"	SoulFly4Real	3:59
17.	"Dans la soucoupe"	XIV	3:46
Total length:			70:13

== Charts ==
=== Weekly charts ===
Chart (2015–2016)	Peak position
Belgian Albums (Ultratop Wallonia)	12
French Albums (SNEP)	2
Swiss Albums (Schweizer Hitparade)	11

=== Year-end charts ===
Chart (2015)	Position
Belgian Albums (Ultratop Wallonia)	182
French Albums (SNEP)	89

Chart (2016)	Position
Belgian Albums (Ultratop Wallonia)	107
French Albums (SNEP)	32

Chart (2017)	Position
Belgian Albums (Ultratop Wallonia)	193

Chart (2018)	Position
Belgian Albums (Ultratop Wallonia)	171

Chart (2019)	Position
Belgian Albums (Ultratop Wallonia)	127

Chart (2020)	Position
Belgian Albums (Ultratop Wallonia)	66

Chart (2021)	Position
Belgian Albums (Ultratop Wallonia)	79

Chart (2024)	Position
Belgian Albums (Ultratop Wallonia)	59

== Certifications ==
Region	Certification	Certified units/sales
France (SNEP)	Diamond	500,000^{‡}
^{‡} Sales+streaming figures based on certification alone.
