= Clubbing for Columbine =

Studio album by Columbine
- Released: January 1, 2016
- Genre: French hip-hop
- Length: 64:16
- Label: Columbine 2k16
- Producer: Foda C; Lujipeka et Saavane

Columbine chronology
2K16 (2014)	Clubbing for Columbine (2016)	Enfants terribles (2017)

Singles from Clubbing for Columbine
- 1. "Mandragore" Released: 18 October 2015; 2. "Dom Pérignon" Released: 1 November 2015; 3. "Fleurs du mal" Released: 29 November 2015; 4. "Les Prélis" Released: 1 January 2016

Clubbing for Columbine is the first studio album by the French band Columbine, released on January 1, 2016 on their own label Columbine 2k16. Its title is a reference to the documentary Bowling for Columbine by Michael Moore, which focuses on the Columbine High School massacre. Initially released as a CD with 500 copies, the album was reissued in January 2018 as a CD and then on December 17, 2018 as a vinyl record. The single it was based on, Les Prélis was certified gold two years after its release, in April 2018.

According to Foda C, Columbine's rap "reflects our generation. We talked about adolescence because that was what we were living through. We saw ourselves as outsiders, the troubled kids of high school." Despite some lighter tracks, Columbine emphasizes the seriousness of their approach: "Through the collective, we want to promote individual talents. We have a sense of humor, but we are serious about what we do."

== Track list ==
No.	Title	Performer(s)	Length
1.	"L'école"		1:08
2.	"Clubbing for Columbine"	Foda C, Yro & Lujipeka	5:00
3.	"Avalanches"	Foda C, Yro & Lujipeka	3:43
4.	"Blue Velvet"	Lujipeka	2:46
5.	"Littleton"	Lujipeka, Foda C, Yro	3:21
6.	"Zone 51"	Foda C, Yro, Lorenzo, Sully	6:07
7.	"Fleurs du mal"	Lujipeka & Yro	3:42
8.	"Les Prélis"	Foda C, Lujipeka	5:04
9.	"2k17"	Foda C, Yro & Lujipeka	3:44
10.	"Dom Pérignon"	Foda C, Lujipeka, Yro & Chaman	4:47
11.	"Ballade sauvage"	Foda C & Yro	3:15
12.	"Document 1"	Yro	3:45
13.	"Main propre"	Foda C, Lujipeka & Yro	3:22
14.	"Mandragore"	Foda C, Sully	4:41
15.	"Retour IRL"	Foda C	5:16
16.	"Éléphant"	Lujipeka, Yro & Foda C	5:02

== Charts ==
Chart (2016)	Peak position
Belgian Albums (Ultratop Wallonia)	160
