= Direct-to-film printing =

Process of printing on textiles decoration using film transfers

Direct-to-film printing (DTF) is a process of printing on textiles. The process involves the direct transfer of a design by first printing it on a special film and then using a heat press to transfer the design to a garment.

== History and adoption ==
Uptake of DTF began in the early 2020s among small and mid-size providers, followed by the introduction of dedicated DTF devices by major equipment manufacturers.

== Process ==
In DTF, the image is typically mirrored and the CMYK layers are printed on PET film, followed by white ink to create an opaque backing. While still tacky, a fine thermoplastic polyurethane hot-melt powder is applied to the printed areas and fused. The transfer is then heat-pressed onto the garment and the carrier film is peeled.

DTF transfers can be produced on modified direct-to-garment devices or on dedicated roll-to-roll systems that integrate the printer with a powder shaker and curing unit. Once cured, transfer films can be stored and used later in the press stage, decoupling printing from garment finishing.

The transfer is heat-pressed at 160–170 °C (320–338 °F) for 10–15 seconds; after pressing, the carrier film is peeled away either hot or cold depending on the film specification.

== Equipment ==
A complete DTF printing setup consists of several integrated components. DTF printers are roll-to-roll inkjet systems equipped with pigment ink and white ink channels. Common printhead configurations include single or dual Epson XP600 heads for entry-level A3 to A1 format printing, and single to quad Epson i3200 heads for professional and industrial use with print widths of 60 cm or wider.

All DTF printers require a white ink circulation system to prevent white ink sedimentation and printhead clogging. An integrated powder shaker unit automatically applies thermoplastic polyurethane (TPU) hot melt powder and cures the film in a single pass. A flat heat press with consistent platen pressure completes the transfer at temperatures of 160–170 °C for 10–15 seconds.

== Comparison with other methods ==
Compared with direct-to-garment printing, DTF does not require fabric pre-treatment and is compatible with a wider variety of materials. Within decorated apparel workflows, industry analysis frames DTF as complementary to screen printing - especially for fine detail and low-quantity jobs, rather than a replacement.

In comparison with a similar type of printing method (Sublimation), DTF have a plastic feel that sits on top of the garment rather than blending in to the fabric.

It also doesn’t support direct ironing on the printed material. It’s advisable to iron inside out.

== Health and safety ==
DTF setups use fine thermoplastic powder and heat to cure inks and adhesives. Occupational guidance recommends controlling exposure at the source. Typical measures include local exhaust ventilation (LEV) at the printer, powder-curing stations, and adequate general room ventilation in line with regulatory standards.
