= Direct-to-garment printing =

Process of printing on textiles

Direct-to-garment printing (DTG) is a process of printing on textiles using specialized aqueous ink jet technology. DTG printers typically have a platen designed to hold the garment in a fixed position, and the printer inks are jetted or sprayed onto the textile by the print head. DTG typically requires that the garment be pre-treated with a PTM or pre-treatment machine, allowing for the following:

- Stronger bond between garment fibers and the pigmented inks
- Flattening of loose fibers to provide a smoother substrate
- Chemical reactions with the inks that promote drying and curing

Since this is a digital process, the print is sharper and has a higher resolution, or DPI, than traditional printing methods such as screen printing. Unlike screen printing, there is no long setup or clean-up process, and DTG printing has the ability to print a single shirt for minimal cost.

== Printing process ==
DTG printers use aqueous textile inks (water-based chemistry) that require a unique curing process. Since D2 inks are water-based, they work best for printing on natural fibers such as cotton, bamboo, hemp, and linen. In addition, pre-treatment is typically applied to the garment before printing. The pre-treatment is heat-pressed into the custom t-shirt causing the fibers of the shirt to lay down. The pre-treatment also allows the water-based inks to bond more fully to the garment. This is especially important when using white ink on dark garments.

Once the fabric has been properly pre-treated, the t-shirt is then positioned onto a platten system designed to hold it in place. The shirt is then digitally printed according to the design in the printer queue.

== History ==
Direct-to-garment printing in the United States began in 1996 with the introduction of the first commercially available DTG printer named "Revolution", developed by DIS of Bradenton, Florida, and based on an invention of Matthew Rhome. Rhome had been working on the DTG project for some years and applied for a patent in July 1996. This patent was granted by the US patent office in August 2000 making it the first DTG patent.

The Revolution printer was offered for sale until 1998 when Rhome left the company to start development of the first Brother DTG printer, which came to market in 2005.

After the release of the Revolution printer, there was a lot of development but not much sales activity in the market until 2004 when Mimaki introduced their printer at the ISS show in Chicago, Illinois and, later that year, when Kornit and US Screen displayed their offerings at the SGIA show in Minneapolis, Minnesota. In 2005, at the ISS Atlantic City show, Brother International introduced the GT-541 Garment Printer to the market making it the first “ground up” DTG printer offered. This printer had print heads, ink, and electronics developed specifically for DTG printing.

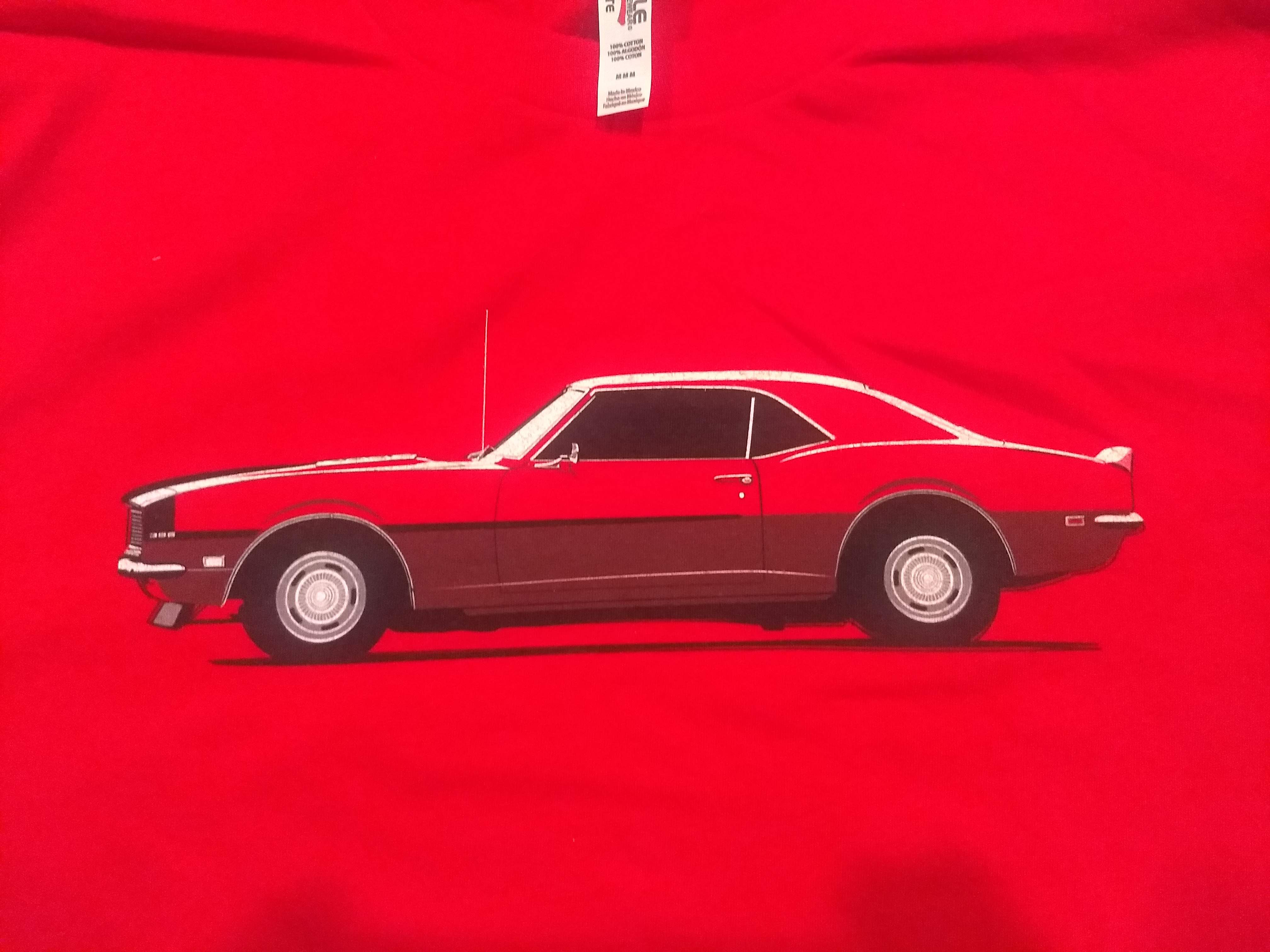
Direct to garment shirt by I Crave Cars featuring a 1968 Camaro illustration. This (DTG) print design uses the shirt as the base color for the illustration.

At the Chicago PRINT 2013 show Epson introduced the F2000 printer. The release of this printer was notable as it addressed many of the issues prevalent in DTG printing at the time. One of the most important features of the Epson F2000 was its ink set as it had a two-year shelf life and did not have the settling or clogging issues of previously introduced DTG inks.

By May 2019, the North American DTG market was currently valued at over $2.5 billion with a compound annual growth rate of 10.5% through 2021.
