= Deux frères (album) =

Studio album by PNL

Studio album by PNL
- Released: 5 April 2019
- Length: 73:00
- Label: QLF

PNL chronology
Dans la légende (2016)	Deux frères (2019)

Singles from Deux frères
- 1. "À l'ammoniaque" Released: 22 June 2018; 2. "91's" Released: 10 August 2018; 3. "Au DD" Released: 22 March 2019; 4. "Deux frères" Released: 3 May 2019; 5. "Blanka" Released: 2 August 2019

Deux frères (French pronunciation: [dø fʁɛʁ]) is the third studio album by French cloud rap duo PNL. It was released on 5 April 2019 through the duo's own QLF Records. The album was preceded by the singles "À l'ammoniaque", "91's", "Au DD", "Deux frères" and "Blanka".

== Track listing ==
Deux frères track listing
No.	Title	Writer(s)	Producer(s)	Length
1.	"Au DD"	Tarik Andrieu; Nabil Andrieu	Trackbastardz (Joa & Nk.F)	4:05
2.	"Autre monde"	Andrieu; Andrieu	BBP	4:40
3.	"Chang"	Andrieu; Andrieu	Adsa Beatz	5:14
4.	"Blanka"	Andrieu; Andrieu	Yann Dakta; Rednose	4:14
5.	"91's"	Andrieu; Andrieu	BBP	3:53
6.	"À l'ammoniaque"	Andrieu; Andrieu	IBØ; Sam H; Anaika	5:16
7.	"Celsius"	Andrieu; Andrieu	BBP	4:02
8.	"Deux frères"	Andrieu; Andrieu	BBP	4:07
9.	"Hasta la vista"	Andrieu; Andrieu	Trackbastardz (Joa & Nk.F)	3:36
10.	"Coeurs"	Andrieu; Andrieu	MKSB	5:58
11.	"Shenmue"	Andrieu; Andrieu	Trackbastardz (Joa & Nk.F)	4:09
12.	"Kuta ubud"	Andrieu; Andrieu	MKSB	5:04
13.	"Menace"	Andrieu; Andrieu	Trackbastardz (Joa & Nk.F)	3:08
14.	"Zoulou tchiang"	Andrieu; Andrieu	BBP	5:25
15.	"Déconnecté"	Andrieu; Andrieu	Trackbastardz (Joa & Nk.F)	5:17
16.	"La misère est si belle"	Andrieu; Andrieu	BBP	5:04
Total length:				73:00

== Charts ==
=== Weekly charts ===
Weekly chart performance for Deux frères
Chart (2019)	Peak position
Austrian Albums (Ö3 Austria)	50
Belgian Albums (Ultratop Flanders)	8
Belgian Albums (Ultratop Wallonia)	1
Canadian Albums (Billboard)	31
French Albums (SNEP)	1
German Albums (Offizielle Top 100)	70
Dutch Albums (Album Top 100)	13
Spanish Albums (PROMUSICAE)	77
Swiss Albums (Schweizer Hitparade)	1

=== Year-end charts ===
2019 year-end chart performance for Deux frères
Chart (2019)	Position
Belgian Albums (Ultratop Flanders)	139
Belgian Albums (Ultratop Wallonia)	2
French Albums (SNEP)	4
Swiss Albums (Schweizer Hitparade)	13

2020 year-end chart performance for Deux frères
Chart (2020)	Position
Belgian Albums (Ultratop Wallonia)	16
French Albums (SNEP)	19

2021 year-end chart performance for Deux frères
Chart (2021)	Position
Belgian Albums (Ultratop Wallonia)	19
French Albums (SNEP)	19

2022 year-end chart performance for Deux frères
Chart (2022)	Position
Belgian Albums (Ultratop Wallonia)	7
Swiss Albums (Schweizer Hitparade)	55

2023 year-end chart performance for Deux frères
Chart (2023)	Position
Belgian Albums (Ultratop Wallonia)	11

2024 year-end chart performance for Deux frères
Chart (2024)	Position
Belgian Albums (Ultratop Wallonia)	12

2025 year-end chart performance for Deux frères
Chart (2025)	Position
Belgian Albums (Ultratop Wallonia)	10

== Certifications ==
Certifications for Deux frères
Region	Certification	Certified units/sales
Belgium (BRMA)	Gold	10,000^{‡}
France (SNEP)	2× Diamond	1,000,000^{‡}
^{‡} Sales+streaming figures based on certification alone.

== Awards and nominations ==
Year	Awards	Category	Result
2020	IMPALA European Awards	Album of the Year	Nominated
