= Lorenzo (rapper) =

French rapper from Brest (born 1994)

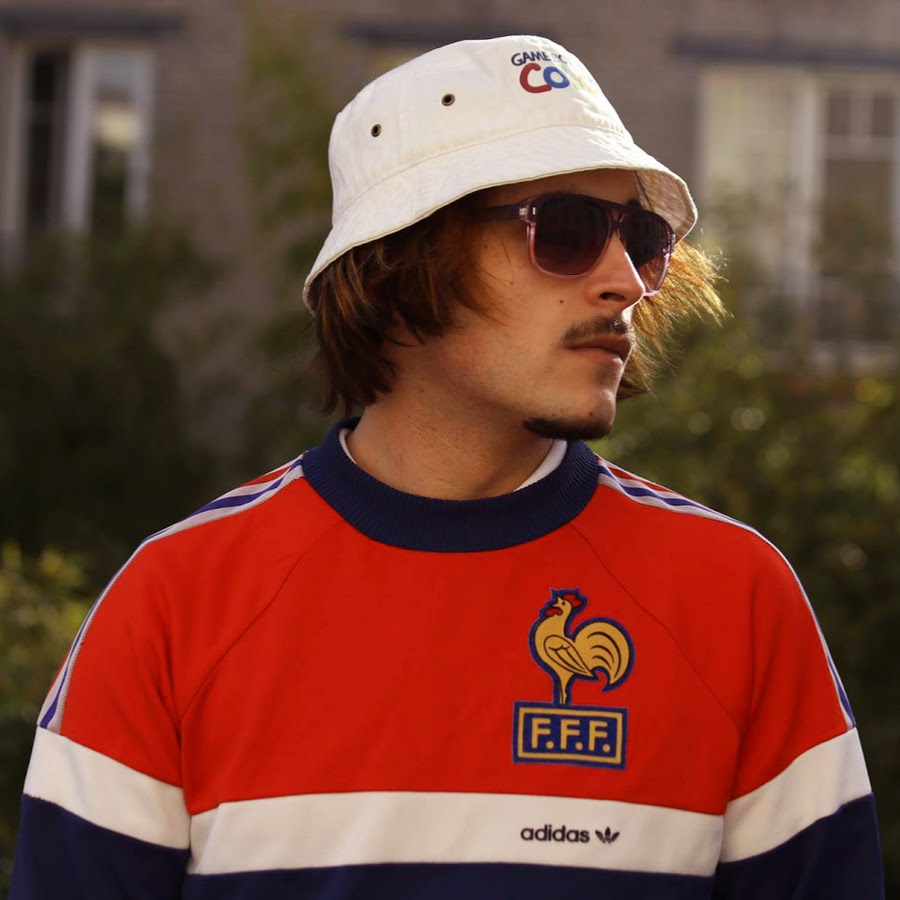
- Lorenzo in 2016

Background information
- Also known as: Larry Garcia; L'Empereur du Sale; Lucien Boursin
- Born: Jérémie Serrandour; 4 June 1994; Brest, France
- Genres: French hip hop, comedy hip hop, Trap music
- Occupation: Rapper
- Years active: 2016–2023
- Label: Universal Music France
- Website: laboutiquedusale.fr

Jérémie Serrandour is a French rapper from Rennes, who has also been known since 2016 by his stage persona Lorenzo. Previously, he was a member of hip hop collective Columbine, under the moniker Larry Garcia. He released his first mixtape as Lorenzo, Empereur du sale, on 31 March 2016. followed by two albums: Rien à branler (2018) and Sex in the City (2019) both topping the French Albums Chart.

== Biography ==
Before becoming a rapper, Jérémie Serrandour followed a literary terminal with a theater and cinema option at the Lycée Bréquigny in Rennes, where he obtained his baccalaureate diploma in 2013. It was there that he met the members of the hip hop collective Columbine. Under the name of Larry Garcia, he produced most of the music videos for the collective Columbine.

In 2016, Lorenzo began his career by posting his humorous songs on YouTube and decided, following numerous requests from his fans, to release a single disc from the album Empereur du sale which he burned on a CD and decorated with marker. It was sold on eBay and within minutes, the price exceeded €50,000 . eBay later removed the CD because of the penis drawn on the cover. He later republished it with the penis blurred.

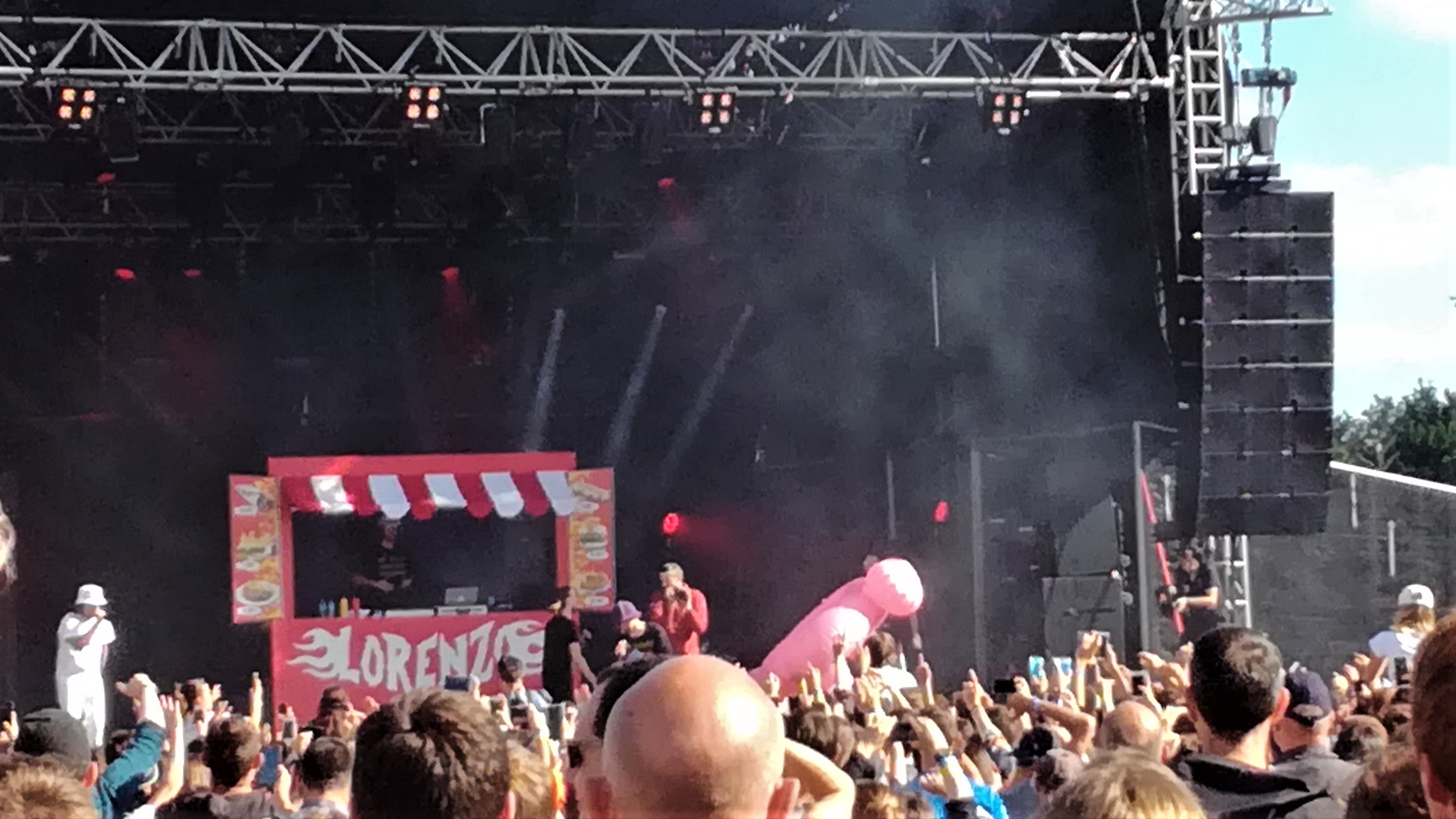
Lorenzo performing at Festival de Bobital in 2017

He works with several labels such as Universal Music and Digital Distribution Serbia. They contributed to his album, Rien à branler, released on February 23, 2018, with the single Carton rouge. The album is certified platinum.

Some of his music videos on YouTube have received millions of views such as Fume à fond, Freestyle du sale and Le Son qui fait plaiz. His single Fume à fond was certified gold two months after its release. In April 2018, the title was certified diamond by the SNEP. He released his third studio album, Sex in the City, on August 23, 2019. The project is certified platinum.

== Discography ==
=== Albums ===
Solo albums

Year	Album	Peak positions				Certifications
Year	Album	FRA	BEL (Fl)	BEL (Wa)	SWI	Certifications
2017	Empereur du sale	102	—	138	—	
2018	Rien à branler	1	184	4	10	SNEP: Platinum
2019	Sex in the City	1	73	3	5	SNEP: Platinum
2022	Légende vivante	1	—	7	16	

=== Singles ===
Year	Title	Peak positions		Album
Year	Title	FRA	BEL (Wa)	Album
2017	"Le son qui fait plaiz"	70	—	Rien à branler
2017	"Fume à fond"	11	4* (Ultratip)	Rien à branler
2017	"Freestyle du sale"	170	—	
2018	"Carton rouge"	5	22* (Ultratip)	Rien à branler
2019	"Damdamdeo"	16	20* (Ultratip)	Sex in the City
2020	"Je vous déteste tous"	17	18* (Ultratip)	Non-album release
2022	"La Kush"	10	—	

*Did not appear in the official Belgian Ultratop 50 charts, but rather in the bubbling under Ultratip charts.

=== Other charted songs ===
Year	Title	Peak positions		Album
Year	Title	FRA	BEL (Wa)	Album
2018	"Bizarre" (feat. Vald)	4	17* (Ultratip)	Rien à branler
2018	"Tu le C"	12	26* (Ultratip)	Rien à branler
2018	"Ce genre" (feat. Columbine)	26	—	Rien à branler
2018	"Bizness"	34	—	Rien à branler
2018	"Champagne & pétou" (feat. Charles Vicomte)	37	—	Rien à branler
2018	"Faudrait"	52	—	Rien à branler
2018	"Les ovni"	55	—	Rien à branler
2018	"Rien à branler"	64	—	Rien à branler
2018	"Sucer la bite"	66	—	Rien à branler
2018	"Ouai mon cars"	72	—	Rien à branler
2018	"Bouteille d'eau"	89	—	Rien à branler
2019	"Nique la bac"	6	2* (Ultratip)	Sex in the City
2019	"Toujours plus" (feat. Orelsan)	13	—	Sex in the City
2019	"Power Rangers"	22	—	Sex in the City
2019	"Nous deux" (feat. Shy'm)	33	—	Sex in the City
2019	"MBK Rocket"	35	—	Sex in the City
2019	"Kekchose"	37	—	Sex in the City
2019	"Voyage auditif" (feat. Le Poto Rico)	45	—	Sex in the City
2019	"Sexto"	47	—	Sex in the City
2019	"Impec" (feat. Tommy Cash & Vladimir Cauchemar)	48	—	Sex in the City
2019	"Nana" (feat. Les Anticipateurs)	50	—	Sex in the City
2019	"Parler de quoi"	51	—	Sex in the City
2019	"Pumpidup" (feat. Oliver Tree)	62	—	Sex in the City
2019	"Juste un soir"	81	—	Sex in the City
2019	"Intro"	84	—	Sex in the City
2019	"Ah c'est cool"	85	—	Sex in the City
2019	"Revolver rose"	106	—	Sex in the City
2021	"Légende vivante"	36	—	Légende vivante
2022	"Coco"	4	20	Légende vivante
2022	"le Daron" (with Jean Dujardin and Vladimir Cauchemar)	30	—	Légende vivante
2022	"Dans L'Appart"	76	—	Légende vivante

*Did not appear in the official Belgian Ultratop 50 charts, but rather in the bubbling under Ultratip charts.
