= Que la famille =

Mixtape by PNL
- Released: 2 March 2015
- Genre: Cloud rap
- Length: 51:12
- Label: QLF

PNL chronology
Que la famille (2015)	Le Monde Chico (2015)

Singles from Que la famille
- 1. "Différents" Released: 10 April 2014; 2. "Je vis, je visser" Released: 13 June 2014; 3. "Gala gala" Released: 19 September 2014; 4. "La petite voix" Released: 28 November 2014; 5. "J'comprends pas" Released: 30 January 2015; 6. "Simba" Released: 20 March 2015

Que la famille is the debut mixtape by French cloud rap duo PNL. It was released on 2 March 2015 through the duo's own QLF Records. The album was preceded by the singles "Différents", "Je vis, je visser", "Gala gala", "La petite voix", "J'comprends pas" and "Simba".

== Track listing ==
Que la famille track listing
No.	Title	Length
1.	"Je vis je visser"	3:46
2.	"Lala"	4:18
3.	"Différents"	6:11
4.	"Obligés de prendre"	3:22
5.	"De la fenêtre au ter ter" (featuring Bizon, Ilinas and S-Pion)	4:29
6.	"PNL"	3:42
7.	"J'comprends pas"	4:43
8.	"Gala gala"	3:44
9.	"La petite voix"	4:20
10.	"Athéna" (featuring RKM and N'Dirty Deh)	4:53
11.	"Recherche du bonheur"	3:42
12.	"Simba"	4:02
Total length:		51:12

== Charts ==
Chart performance for Que la famille
Chart (2015)	Peak position
Belgian Albums (Ultratop Wallonia)	113
French Albums (SNEP)	82

== Certifications ==
Certifications for Que la famille
Region	Certification	Certified units/sales
France (SNEP)	2× Platinum	200,000^{‡}
^{‡} Sales+streaming figures based on certification alone.
