= Cité Gagarine =

Housing project in Ivry-sur-Seine, France

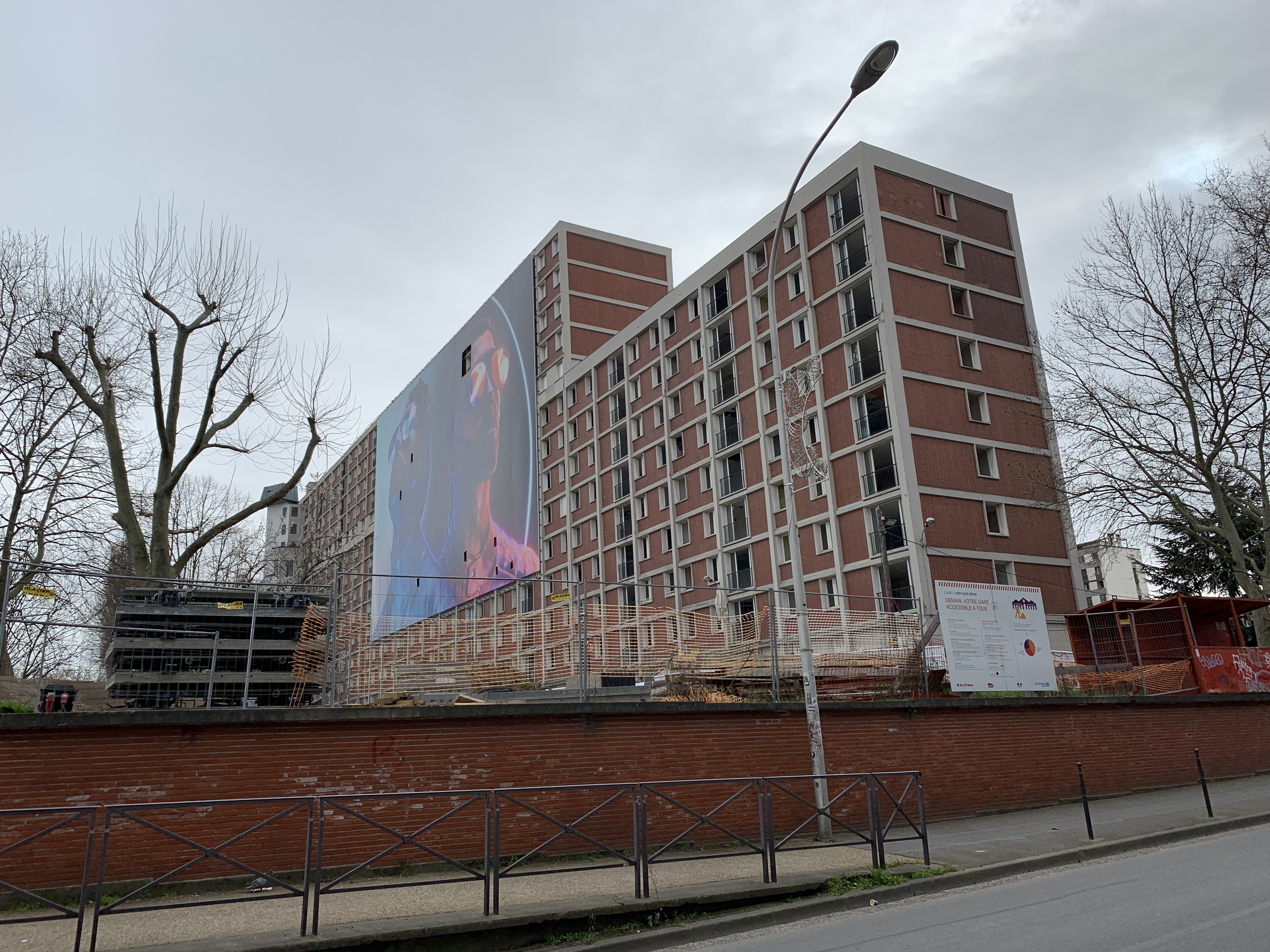
- Cité Gagarine in the process of demolition in 2020
- Interactive map of Cité Gagarine

General information
- Location: Ivry-sur-Seine, France
- Coordinates: 48°48′52″N 2°23′15″E
- No. of units: 382

Construction
- Constructed: 1961-1963

Listing
- Demolished: 2019, on-going

Cité Gagarine was a housing project in Ivry-sur-Seine, France. It was built by the Communist Party of France government starting in 1961 and inaugurated in 1963, and was a symbol of the vibrancy of communism in France at the time. It was named for the Soviet cosmonaut Yuri Gagarin, the first human who went to space. Gagarin attended the inauguration of the housing project in 1963.

With the de-industrialization of France in the 1970s, the workforce that comprised the main part of the population of Cité Gagarine began to lose its employment, and voter affiliation with the Communist Party of France declined. Over the years, Cité Gagarine came to house more immigrants from outside of France.

Cité Gagarine's demolition began in 2019 and took place over 16 months. The start of the demolition of the housing project drew crowds and made news both in France and internationally.

A film made by writer-director duo Fanny Liatard and Jérémy Trouilh released in 2020, Gagarine, is set on the estate as it faces impending demolition, exploring themes of isolation and community in a magical realist manner.
