= 91's =

Single by PNL

from the album Deux frères
- Released: 10 August 2018
- Recorded: 2018
- Length: 3:58
- Label: QLF
- Songwriters: Tarik Andrieu; Nabil Andrieu
- Producer: BBP

PNL singles chronology
"À l'ammoniaque" (2018)	"91's" (2018)	"Au DD" (2019)

"91's" is a song by French rap duo PNL. It was released on 10 August 2018 as the second single from their third studio album Deux frères. It debuted at number one on the French SNEP singles chart.

== Charts ==
Chart performance for "91's"
Chart (2018)	Peak position
Belgium (Ultratop 50 Wallonia)	1
France (SNEP)	1
Switzerland (Schweizer Hitparade)	8

== Certifications ==
Certifications for "91's"
Region	Certification	Certified units/sales
France (SNEP)	Diamond	333,333^{‡}
^{‡} Sales+streaming figures based on certification alone.
