= PNL (rap duo) =

French rap band

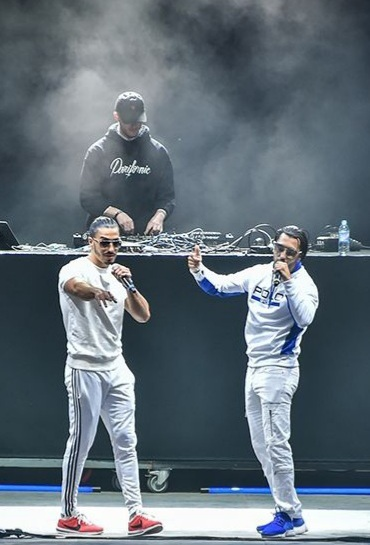
- N.O.S (left) and Ademo (right) performing in 2016

Background information
- Origin: Les Tarterêts, Corbeil-Essonnes, Île-de-France, France
- Genres: Cloud rap; emo rap; alternative hip hop
- Years active: 2014–present
- Labels: PNL (2014–2015); QLF (2015–present); Musicast (2015–2018); Believe (2018–present)
- Members: Ademo; N.O.S
- Website: qlf-shop.fr

PNL (French pronunciation: [pe ɛnɛl]; acronym for Peace N' Lovés, lit. 'Peace and Money') is a French rap duo consisting of siblings Ademo (born Tarik Andrieu, French: [taʁik ɑ̃dʁijø]) and N.O.S (born Nabil Andrieu, [nabil ɑ̃dʁijø]), from Corbeil-Essonnes. Formed in 2014, they released their debut studio album, Le Monde Chico the next year. In 2016, the duo released their second album, Dans la légende, which has peaked at number one on the French Albums chart and sold over a million copies worldwide. PNL's third album, Deux frères (2019), supported by the number one singles "À l'ammoniaque", "91's" and "Au DD". has also topped the chart in France.

== Early life ==
Tarik Francois Andrieu and Nabil Andrieu grew up in the poor neighbourhood of Les Tarterêts, Corbeil-Essonnes, Île-de-France. Tarik was born on December 26, 1986, and Nabil on April 25, 1989. Their father, René Andrieu, a Pied-Noir native of Corsica, was involved in a bank robbery and served an eight years sentence at the Maison centrale— the designation of prisons for dangerous and/or long sentence detainees in France— of Poissy. René is an important figure in his community. The brothers were brought up in the absence of their mother, a native of Algeria.

Ademo (Tarik) went to jail twice in 2010 and 2013 for drug trafficking.

Before forming PNL, the two brothers first evolved solo. Tarik released his first mixtape Le Son des Halls Vol. 1 in 2008, followed by the second volume in 2011. Nabil released a mixtape titled Calmement (365 Jours Pour Percer) in 2011. While comparing their early solo works to PNL, Abcdr du Son editor-in-chief Mehdi Maizi say: "What impressed me was their metamorphosis. It's as if they had passed through a rap laboratory and came out better".

== Career ==
=== 2014–2018: Le Monde Chico and Dans la légende ===
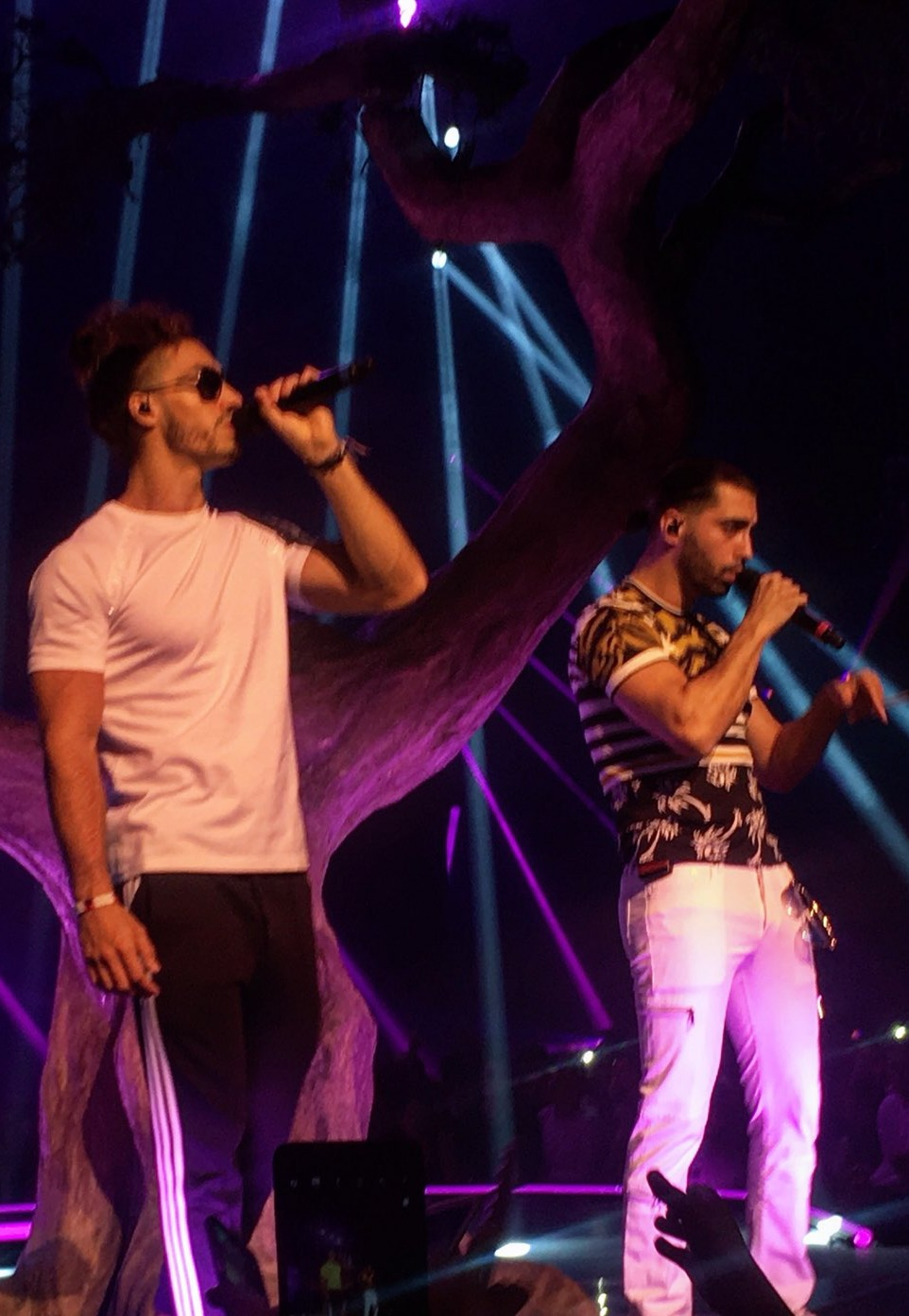
PNL performing during the Dans la légende tour in 2017.

The duo released their first song together in early 2014 after Ademo got out of prison. They released a mixtape titled Que la famille in March 2015, followed by the debut studio album, Le monde Chico, in October of the same year. The album was certified 2× platinum for selling over 200,000 copies in France. One of the singles from the album, "Le monde ou rien", went viral becoming a political slogan for the Nuit debout social movement against proposed labor reforms known as the El Khomri law.

Their second album, Dans la légende, released on September 16, 2016, was certified diamond for selling over 1,000,000 copies in total in more than 5 countries around Europe. To promote the album, the duo went on a six-city tour in France through 2017.

PNL were set to perform at Coachella, one of the biggest music festivals in the United States during its 2017 edition. However, due to Ademo's criminal record, he was denied entry into the country. Through 2018, PNL released the singles, "À l'ammoniaque" and "91's", both have reached number one on the French singles chart.

=== 2019–present: Deux frères ===
On April 5, 2019, PNL released their third album, Deux frères, which sold more than 100,000 copies in its first week of release, a record for French rap. The album's third single, "Au DD", has topped the French singles chart. They shot the music video for "Au DD" on the Eiffel Tower, becoming the first duo or band to do so. The album was nominated for IMPALA's European Independent Album of the Year Award.

In June 2019, the duo presented their QLF collection of sneakers, tracksuits, jeans and T-shirts, followed by their appearance in the Off-White fashion show in Paris. In July, it was announced that Apple Music has signed PNL and will co-brand their music videos and promote special joint events. In the same month, PNL released the song "Tahia" in honor of Algeria after the country's victory in the 2019 Africa Cup of Nations.

In July 2020, PNL released an hour-long tour documentary on Netflix France from a 2017 concert. In September 2020, Ademo was arrested in Paris on drug use and public disorder charges. The arrest was filmed by several fans and appeared to show him being held on the ground by police officers, and then handcuffed.

== Artistry ==
=== Musical style and influences ===
PNL’s wide appeal mostly stems from its sheer catchiness and production. However, digging deeper reveals skillful and poignant observations about life in the neglected immigrant communities of European metropolises such as Paris (and really, around the world), areas which many have strong opinions of, but which receive little assistance with stopping the cycle of poverty and hopelessness.

— Sayan Ghosh of The Michigan Daily about PNL

PNL's music is labeled as cloud rap and their style has been described as "raw, hypnotic and moving" by French journalist Olivier Cachin. According to France Info's Laure Narlian "the contrast between the softness of the music and the rawness of the lyrics is what characterizes them best now". The main themes of the duo's songs are money, drug trafficking, family and the feeling of being different from other people. Apple Music 1’s Zane Lowe has described the duo as melding modern U.S. hip-hop production sonics with “that struggling sound of a community [which is] burdened with unemployment, austerity measures, drugs, gangs, racism, and a whole host of other social issues”.

Writing for openDemocracy, Adem Ferizaj said: "On the one hand, PNL stands out sound-aesthetically from other rap artists through their choice of atmospheric and often sentimental instrumentals. On the other hand, they are innovative, in terms of flows signifying the rap technique in hip hop culture, in their use of technical voice tools – especially the vocoder. Through these means, they are constantly crossing boundaries between music genres".

Juice magazine's editor Joram Vuille wrote; "[PNL is] the first French rap group to really master Autotune and finally use it like an instrument, adapting their flows and lyrics to beats borrowed from the internet. PNL gave their French compatriots what they could only get from the Americans. They made you forget the lyrics and brought a certain atmosphere to the fore; an atmosphere that can also be found in their videos. It seemed as if for the first time a French group had managed to completely translate the new codes from across the Atlantic into French. And French rap finally proved that it could be sad, melancholy, depressed without using the otherwise inevitable and the utmost dead piano samples."

As practising Muslims, Islam is one of their major artistic influences. In the song "Chang" from their third album, there's a line by Ademo rapping “I'm not leading a life according to Din but I'm always trying to become a better person”. PNL often make references to cartoons (The Lion King, The Jungle Book), films (Scarface) and video games; naming one of their singles "Onizuka" after the Japanese manga Great Teacher Onizuka.

=== Public image ===
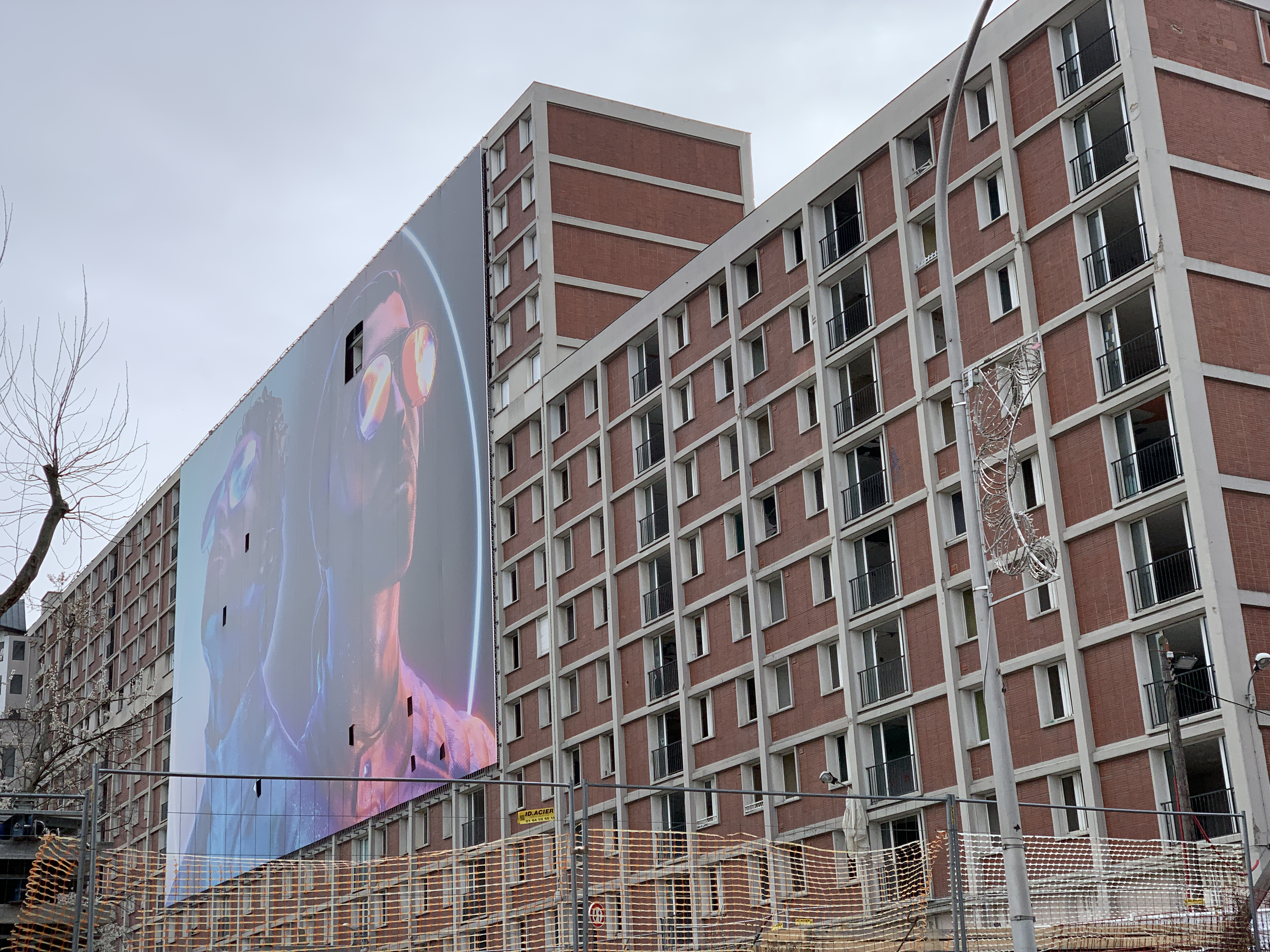
The artwork of Deux frères on Cité Gagarine in Ivry-sur-Seine.

The duo is characterized by total absence of interviews in the media, as well as innovative music videos shot in Iceland, Namibia, Italy, Japan, United States, South Africa, Jamaica, and elsewhere in the world. PNL was featured on the cover of The Fader American magazine's June/July 2016 issue. Gonzaï magazine writer Albert Poriton has called PNL "the Daft Punk without robot masks and with sunglasses", noting that other rap groups have started to "copy and paste" their "raw arrogance and urban melancholy".

In a 2015 article for i-D, Gino Delmas described PNL: "Long hair for one, slicked back for the other, tight polo shirt, a mix of sport and designer clothes. The PNL style, without make-up or overplay, takes a backhanded rap game where luxury and ostentatiousness are omnipresent, at the same time as it gives a glimpse of the 2015 vintage suburb look." In 2020, GQ France named N.O.S as one of the most stylish French rappers, stating that his generally sportswear-oriented choices and hair daring make him "look effortlessly classy".

== Discography ==
- Le Monde Chico (2015)
- Dans la légende (2016)
- Deux frères (2019)

== Awards and nominations ==
Year	Awards	Category	Work	Result
2020	Victoires de la Musique	Best Music Video	"Au DD"	Won
2020	IMPALA European Awards	Album of the Year	Deux frères	Nominated

== Filmography ==
Films
Year	Title	Role	Notes
2020	Dans la légende tour	Themselves	Netflix documentary

== Tours ==
- Dans la légende Tour (2018)
- PNL Tour 2019(2019)
