= Planète Rap =

French radio programme

- Running time: 1 or 2 hours
- Country of origin: France
- Language: French
- Home station: Skyrock (radio station)
- Hosted by: Fred Musa
- Original release: 1996
- Website: skyrock.fm/emissions/planete-rap
- Podcast: https://www.deezer.com/fr/show/56853

Planète Rap is a French radio programme broadcast on Skyrock, hosted by Fred Musa.

== Background ==
Planète Rap presents Rap and R'n'B artists, with live performances, freestyles, interviews, behind-the-scenes footage, as well as mixes performed and chosen by the guest artists. It is a daily show, broadcast from 8 to 9 pm, Monday to Friday, which devotes an entire week to an artist or a project (compilation releases, events, etc.)

"Planète Rap - La Nocturne" takes place every Friday night from 00:00 to 2:00. The show plays French rap songs and usually invites a guest. There are live freestyles or a feature on the guest and their music.

== Audience ==
Between 1996 and 2007, Planète Rap was the most popular Rap and R'n'B (radio) programme among the under-25s. As of November 2025, its YouTube channel have over 150 million views.

== Output ==
=== Print ===
It has also produced a monthly (paper) magazine, Planète Rap Mag, since July 2006. The magazine presents artists, through interviews, photos, posters, lyrics and reviews over about sixty pages.

=== Television ===
At the time it was launched on France 4 in January 2006, it was the "only rap show in French broadcasting". The programme was discontinued on 8 December 2007 on France 4 and broadcast instead on France Ô for a while, before disappearing from the air. On France 4, the programme aired for hour on Saturday evenings at around 7pm. On France Ô, the show was recorded specifically for television and lasted about 30 minutes, including news, freestyles and new tracks. Since 2024, the show has returned to broadcast on TV, this time on France 2 on Friday nights.

The rapper Busta Flex was the first guest on Planète Rap in January 1998, beginning a new direction for the show, which previously had no guests.

== See also ==
- Booska-P - French hip-hop magazine
- Mass media in France
