= À l'ammoniaque =

2018 single by PNL

Single by PNL

from the album Deux frères
- Released: 22 June 2018
- Recorded: 2018
- Length: 5:16
- Label: QLF
- Songwriters: Tarik Andrieu; Nabil Andrieu
- Producers: IBØ; Sam H; Anaika

PNL singles chronology
"Jusqu'au dernier gramme" (2017)	"À l'ammoniaque" (2018)	"91's" (2018)

Music video
- "À l'ammoniaque" on YouTube

"À l'ammoniaque" (pronounced [a lamɔnjak]) is a song by French rap duo PNL. It was released on 22 June 2018 as the debut single from their third studio album Deux frères. The song peaked atop the charts of France.

== Music video ==
The accompanying music video, directed by Kamerameha, Mess and Kim Chapiron, was filmed in South Africa and was premiered through PNL's official YouTube channel on 22 June 2018.

== Charts ==
Chart performance for "À l'ammoniaque"
Chart (2018)	Peak position
Belgium (Ultratop 50 Wallonia)	14
France (SNEP)	1
Switzerland (Schweizer Hitparade)	17

== Certifications ==
Certifications for "À l'ammoniaque"
Region	Certification	Certified units/sales
France (SNEP)	Diamond	333,333^{‡}
^{‡} Sales+streaming figures based on certification alone.
