= The Voice Kids (French TV series) season 11 =

French talent show season

The Voice Kids
- Season 11
- Hosted by: Karine Ferri; Nikos Aliagas
- Coaches: Soprano; Matt Pokora; Santa; Patrick Fiori
- No. of contestants: 32
- Winner: Charlotte Deseigne
- Winning coach: Patrick Fiori

Release
- Original network: TF1
- Original release: 30 August – 4 October 2025

Season chronology
- ← Previous; Season 10 Next → Season 12

The eleventh season of French The Voice Kids is a talent show broadcast on TF1, which premiered on 30 August 2025. Of the coaches from the previous season, only Patrick Fiori returned this season, marking his tenth season as a coach. In the meantime, former coaches Soprano and Matt Pokora returned as coaches after last coaching in the seventh and fourth seasons, respectively. Additionally, Santa debuted as a coach this season. Karine Ferri and Nikos Aliagas both returned the hosts of the season.

Charlotte Deseigne from Team Patrick won the season on 4 October, marking Patrick Fiori's fifth win as a coach. With Deseigne's win, Fiori became the second most winning coach on the French version of The Voice, after Florent Pagny.

== Coaches ==
Coaches of The Voice Kids France Season 11

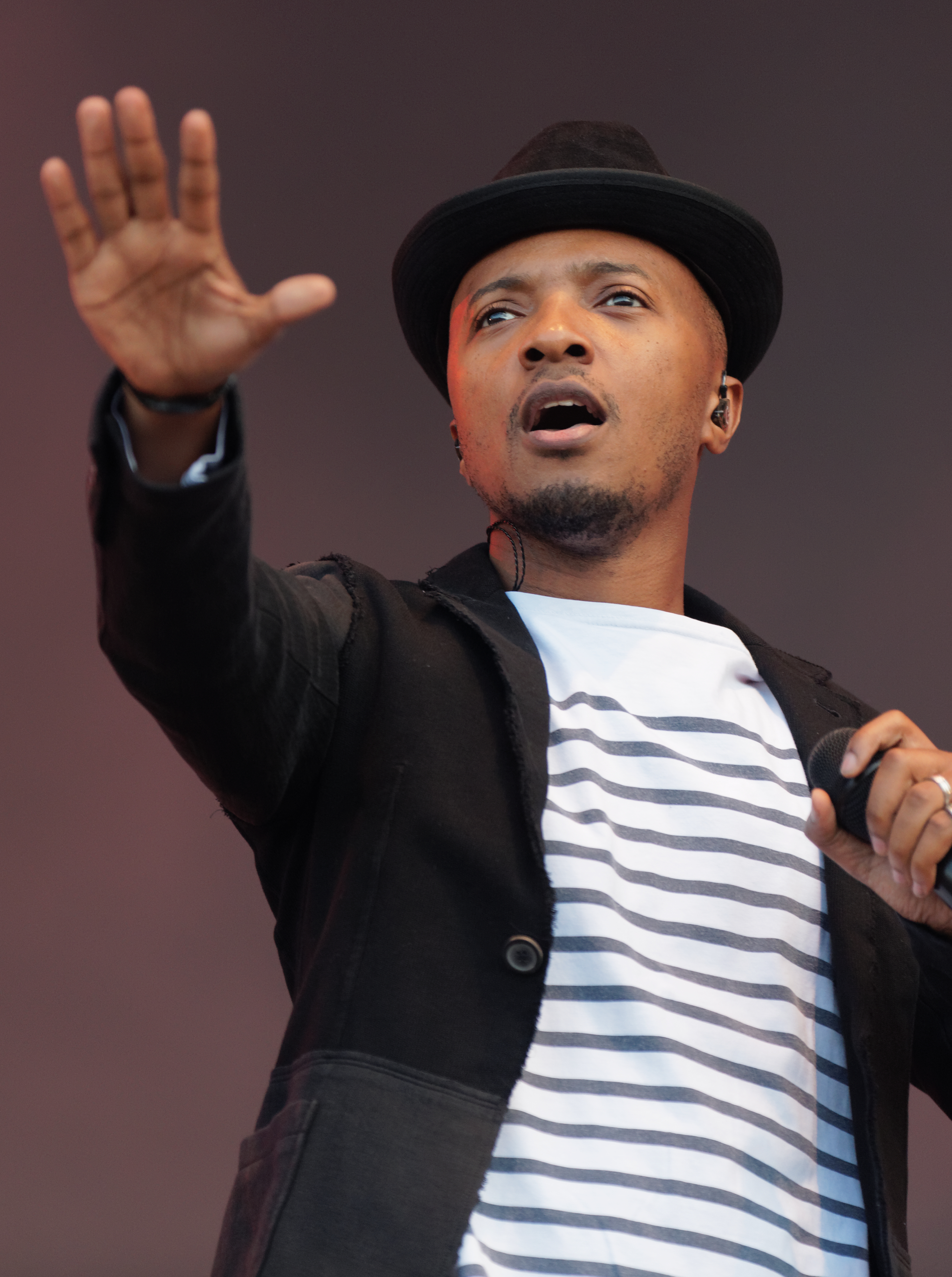
Soprano

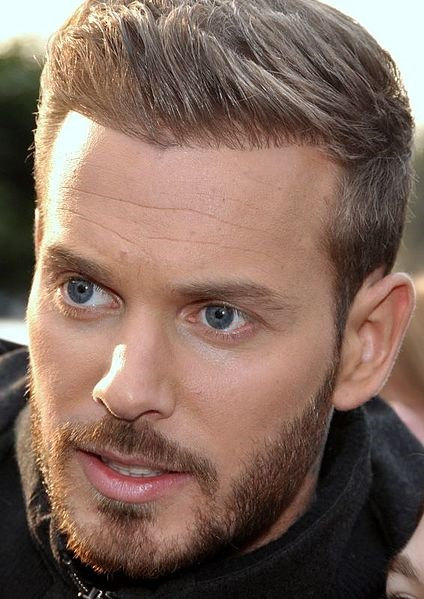
Matt Pokora

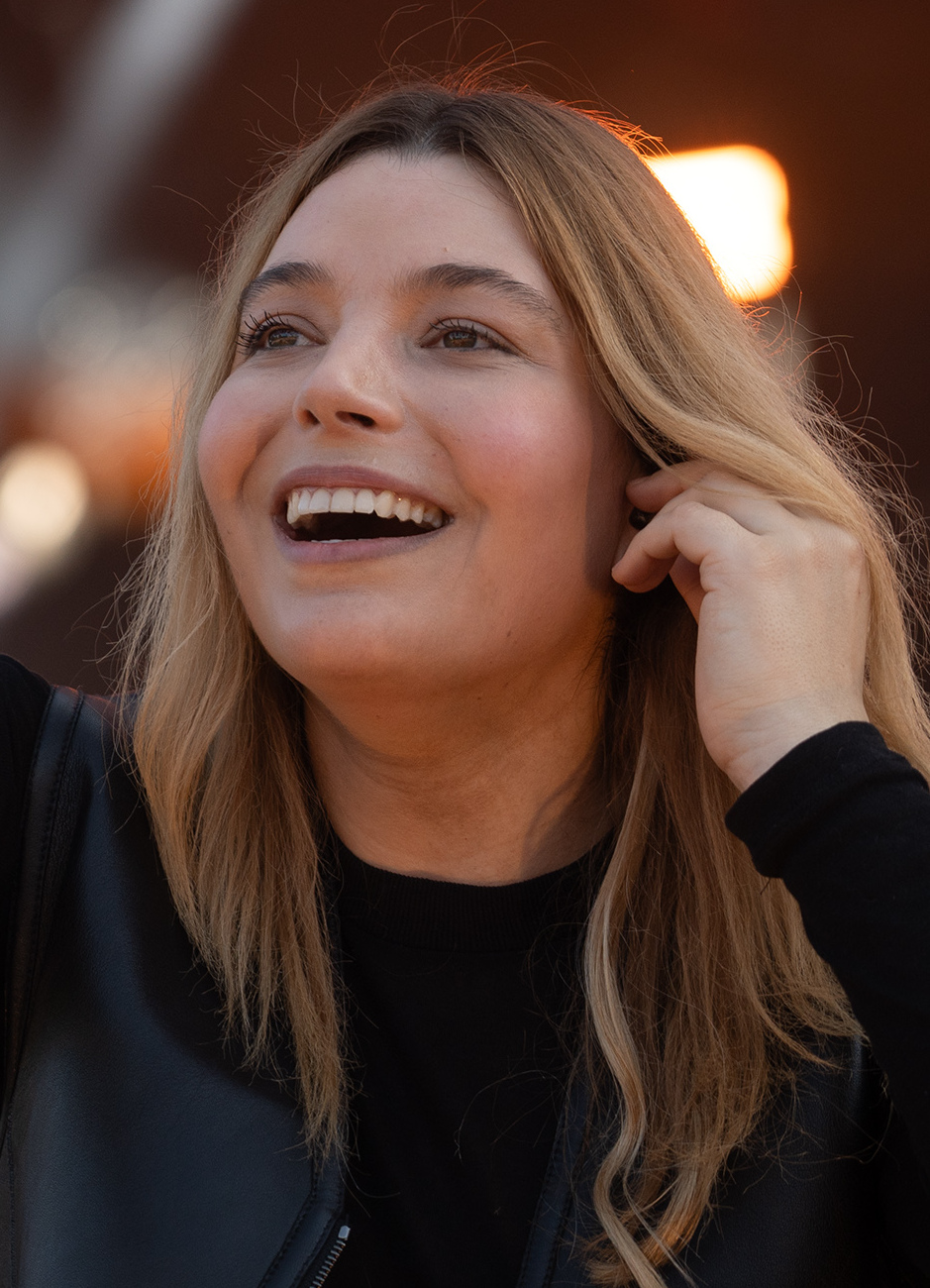
Santa

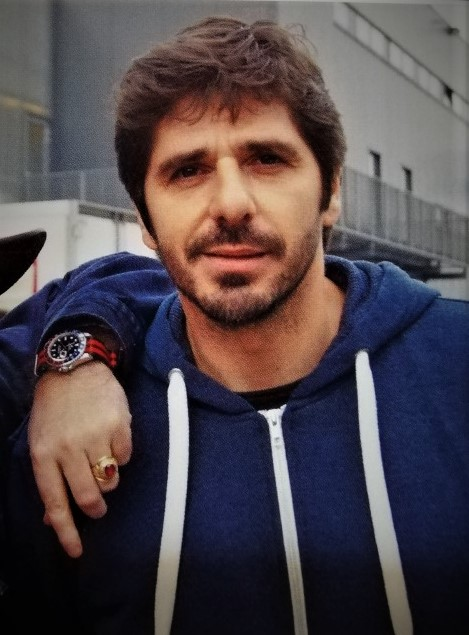
Patrick Fiori

Only Patrick Fiori returned as a coach, for his tenth season. Soprano and Matt Pokora, who both previously served as a coaches last in the seventh and fourth seasons, respectively, returned to the panel. Santa debuted as a coach, after serving as a battle advisor for Fiori's team in the previous season.

== Teams ==
Colour key

- Winner
- Runner-up
- Eliminated in the Final
- Eliminated in the Groups

Coaching teams
Coaches	Top 32 Artists			
Soprano				
Soprano	Ella	Miriam	Angie	Keylia
Soprano	Shilath	Charlie	Milla	Néo
Matt Pokora				
Matt Pokora	Kimon	Roxane	Ariane	Gabriella
Matt Pokora	Jade	Constantin	Lyanna	Sasha
Santa				
Santa	Wylie	Diego	Eileen	Émeline
Santa	Juliette	Margaux	Mariami	Ninon
Patrick Fiori				
Patrick Fiori	Charlotte	Albert	Dony	Gaëtan
Patrick Fiori	Ilian	Matilda	Mélody-Rose	Nelly

== Blind auditions ==
In the blind auditions, the four coaches are turned in a chair from the singer on the stage (hence the term "blind auditions"). When the coach wants to work with the artist, they press a buzzer in front of them, which then turns the chair to face the candidate, which means that the juror, who finally physically pushed the buzzer the candidate, is ready to coach the candidate and wants them on their team. If the coach is the only one to have turned around, then the artist goes by default to their team. On the other hand, if several coaches turn around, it is then up to the artist to choose which coach they want to join.

The "Super Block" rule is renewed this season. This rule allows a coach to block another coach until the final choice of the talent (therefore still usable after the talent's performance) and no longer before the latter turns around.

Blind auditions color key
✔	Coach pressed "I WANT YOU" button
	Artist defaulted to this coach's team
	Artist elected to join this coach's team
	Artist was eliminated with no coach pressing their button
✘	Coach pressed "I WANT YOU" button, but was super-blocked by another coach from getting the artist
	Blocked by Soprano; Blocked by Matt; Blocked by Santa; Blocked by Patrick

=== Episode 1 (30 August) ===
During the episode, the coaches sang Santa's "Chanter le monde" to kick off the season.

First blind auditions results
Order	Artist	Age	Song	Coach's and artist's choices			
Order	Artist	Age	Song	Soprano	Matt	Santa	Patrick
1	Diego	10	"Vivre pour le meilleur"	✔	✘	✔	✔
2	Jade	8	"Premier amour"	✔	✔	–	–
3	Valentine	12	"Gigi l'amoroso"	–	–	–	–
4	Gaëtan	12	"Lettre à France"	✘	✔	✔	✔
5	Angie	11	"The Loneliest"	✔	–	–	–
6	Wylie	12	"Pink Pony Club"	✔	✔	✔	✔
7	Charlotte	14	"Speed"	✔	✔	✔	✔
8	Eduardo	14	"Nous on sait"	–	–	–	–
9	Sasha	12	"Round and Round"	✔	✔	–	–
10	Keylia	15	"California Dreamin'"	✔	✔	✔	✔
11	Nino	13	"We Will Rock You"	–	–	–	–
12	Milla	10	"Caroline"	✔	✔	–	✔
13	Timéo	12	"Maman"	–	–	–	–
14	Juliette	11	"Désolée"	–	–	✔	–

=== Episode 2 (6 September) ===
Second blind auditions results
Order	Artist	Age	Song	Coach's and artist's choices			
Order	Artist	Age	Song	Soprano	Matt	Santa	Patrick
1	Kimon	13	"Vampire"	✔	✔	✔	✔
2	Eva	9	"Joe le taxi"	–	–	–	–
3	Nelly	15	"Move Over"	✔	✔	✘	✔
4	Ninon	14	"Fais-moi signe"	✔	–	✔	–
5	Néo	14	"La Foule"	✔	✔	–	–
6	Gabriella	15	"Hope There's Someone"	–	✔	–	–
7	Chloé	7	"Allo, allo, monsieur l'ordinateur"	–	–	–	–
8	Miriam	12	"Listen"	✔	✔	✔	✔
9	Constantin	15	"Beggin'"	✔	✔	✔	✔
10	Émeline	10	"La bonne étoile"	–	–	✔	–
11	Dony	14	"Bella ciao"	✔	–	✔	✔
12	Kaïs	7	"Allez l'OM"	–	–	–	–
13	Charlie	11	"Flash"	✔	✔	–	–
14	Ariane	13	"Tomorrow"	–	✔	–	–
15	Nathan	9	"Monday, Tuesday... Laissez-moi danser"	–	–	–	–

=== Episode 3 (13 September) ===
Third blind auditions results
Order	Artist	Age	Song	Coach's and artist's choices			
Order	Artist	Age	Song	Soprano	Matt	Santa	Patrick
1	Ella	13	"Good Luck, Babe!"	✔	✔	✔	✘
2	Shilath	7	"Mamma Mia"	✔	–	–	–
3	Albert	11	"Dle Yaman"	✔	✔	✔	✔
4	Florian	12	"Recommence-moi"	Team full	–	–	–
5	Margaux	13	"I Will Always Love You"	✔	✔	✔	✔
6	Matilda	10	"Fortunatu"	Team full	–	–	✔
7	Five (Gabriel, Julian, Matthieu, Maxime & Titouan)	11 & 12	"Tombé"	Team full	–	–	–
8	Eileen	12	"Tourner la tête"	✔	✔	✔	–
9	Roxane	14	"Flamme"	Team full	✔	–	–
10	Aman	6	"Les yeux de la mama"	Team full	–	–	–
11	Mélody-Rose	11	"I Want You Back"	✔^{1}	–	–	✔
12	Mariami	15	"Shallow"	Team full	–	✔	–
13	Lyanna	10	"Apt."	✔^{2}	✔	Team full	–
14	Maëlle	10	"Ils sont fous ces humains !"	Team full	Team full	Team full	–
15	Ilian	12	"Ensemble"	Team full	Team full	Team full	✔

- ^1 Although Soprano turned for Mélody Rose, he did not have a chance to obtain the artist due to his team being full; therefore, Mélody-Rose was defaulted to Fiori's team.
- ^2 Although Soprano turned for Lyanna, he did not have a chance to obtain the artist due to his team being full; therefore, Lyanna was defaulted to Pokora's team.

== Groups ==
For this last stage before the final, the coaches formed two groups of four artists. Only one artist per group will be selected for the final. Three guests joined the artists: actress Isabelle Nanty, comedian and actor Arnaud Ducret and singer Nej'.

=== Episode 4 (20 September) ===
The coaches performed "Je te donne" by Jean-Jacques Goldman and Michael Jones.

Groups color key
Artist was saved by their coach and advanced to the final
Artist was eliminated

Groups Results
Coach	Order	Artist	Song	Result
Santa	1	Diego	"Can You Feel the Love Tonight"	Advanced
Santa	1	Émeline	"Can You Feel the Love Tonight"	Eliminated
Santa	1	Juliette	"Can You Feel the Love Tonight"	Eliminated
Santa	1	Margaux	"Can You Feel the Love Tonight"	Eliminated
Soprano	2	Charlie	"Maman"	Eliminated
Soprano	2	Ella	"Maman"	Advanced
Soprano	2	Milla	"Maman"	Eliminated
Soprano	2	Néo	"Maman"	Eliminated
Patrick Fiori	3	Albert	"Help!" / "I Want to Break Free" / "Ça (c'est vraiment toi)" / "Partir un jour" / "What Makes You Beautiful"	Advanced
Patrick Fiori	3	Dony	"Help!" / "I Want to Break Free" / "Ça (c'est vraiment toi)" / "Partir un jour" / "What Makes You Beautiful"	Eliminated
Patrick Fiori	3	Gaëtan	"Help!" / "I Want to Break Free" / "Ça (c'est vraiment toi)" / "Partir un jour" / "What Makes You Beautiful"	Eliminated
Patrick Fiori	3	Ilian	"Help!" / "I Want to Break Free" / "Ça (c'est vraiment toi)" / "Partir un jour" / "What Makes You Beautiful"	Eliminated
Matt Pokora	4	Constantin	"Abracadabra"	Eliminated
Matt Pokora	4	Lyanna	"Abracadabra"	Eliminated
Matt Pokora	4	Roxane	"Abracadabra"	Advanced
Matt Pokora	4	Sasha	"Abracadabra"	Eliminated
Patrick Fiori	5	Charlotte	"Forever Young"	Advanced
Patrick Fiori	5	Matilda	"Forever Young"	Eliminated
Patrick Fiori	5	Mélody-Rose	"Forever Young"	Eliminated
Patrick Fiori	5	Nelly	"Forever Young"	Eliminated
Santa	6	Eileen	"Chanter pour ceux qui sont loin de chez eux"	Eliminated
Santa	6	Mariami	"Chanter pour ceux qui sont loin de chez eux"	Eliminated
Santa	6	Ninon	"Chanter pour ceux qui sont loin de chez eux"	Eliminated
Santa	6	Wylie	"Chanter pour ceux qui sont loin de chez eux"	Advanced
Matt Pokora	7	Ariane	"Feel Good"	Eliminated
Matt Pokora	7	Gabriella	"Feel Good"	Eliminated
Matt Pokora	7	Jade	"Feel Good"	Eliminated
Matt Pokora	7	Kimon	"Feel Good"	Advanced
Soprano	8	Angie	"Ma muse"	Eliminated
Soprano	8	Keylia	"Ma muse"	Eliminated
Soprano	8	Miriam	"Ma muse"	Advanced
Soprano	8	Shilath	"Ma muse"	Eliminated

== Final ==
The final aired on 4 October. In this round, the remaining two artists on each team sing to earn one spot in the grand final. The top four artists performed once more with the artist receiving the most public votes being declared the winner of the season. At the end of the episode, Charlotte Deseigne from Team Patrick was declared the winner, marking Patrick Fiori's fifth win as a coach.

=== Episode 5 (4 October) ===
==== Final ====
Final color key
Artist advanced to the final
Artist was eliminated

Order	Coach	Artist	Song
1	Patrick Fiori	Albert	"My Heart Will Go On"
2	Patrick Fiori	Charlotte	"Si je m'en sors"
3	Santa	Wylie	"Set Fire to the Rain"
4	Santa	Diego	"Earth Song"
5	Matt Pokora	Roxane	"Dernière danse"
6	Matt Pokora	Kimon	"This Is Me"
7	Soprano	Miriam	"All the Man That I Need"
8	Soprano	Ella	"La Symphonie des éclairs"

==== Grand Final ====
In the grand final, each artist sung a duet with a guest artist as his/her final performance

Grand Final color key
Winner
Runner-up

Order	Coach	Artist	Song	Duet with	Result
1	Santa	Wylie	"Ma faute"	Marine	Runner-up
2	Matt Pokora	Kimon	"Ma philosophie"	Amel Bent	Runner-up
3	Patrick Fiori	Charlotte	"Je pense à vous"	Linh	Winner
4	Soprano	Ella	"Mauvais garçon"	Helena	Runner-up
