= The Voice Kids (French TV series) season 12 =

The Voice Kids
- Season 12
- Promotional poster featuring coaches Fiori, Santa, Pokora, and Soprano
- Hosted by: Styleto; Nikos Aliagas
- Coaches: Soprano; Matt Pokora; Santa; Patrick Fiori
- No. of contestants: 40
- Winner: Nelson Charles
- Winning coach: Matt Pokora

Release
- Original network: TF1
- Original release: 22 August – 3 October 2026

Season chronology
- ← Previous; Season 11

The twelfth season of French The Voice Kids is a talent show which premiered on 22 August 2026 on TF1. All four coaches from the previous season; Soprano, Matt Pokora, Santa, and Patrick Fiori; returned this season. Nikos Aliagas returned as the presenter of the show, and was joined by Styleto, who replaced Karine Ferri as the backstage host.

Nelson Charles from Team Matt won the season on 3 October, marking Matt Pokora's second win (and third overall) as a coach. With Charles' win, Pokora also became the third coach, after Florent Pagny and Zazie to win three times across all versions of the show.

== Coaches and hosts ==
Coaches of The Voice Kids France Season 12

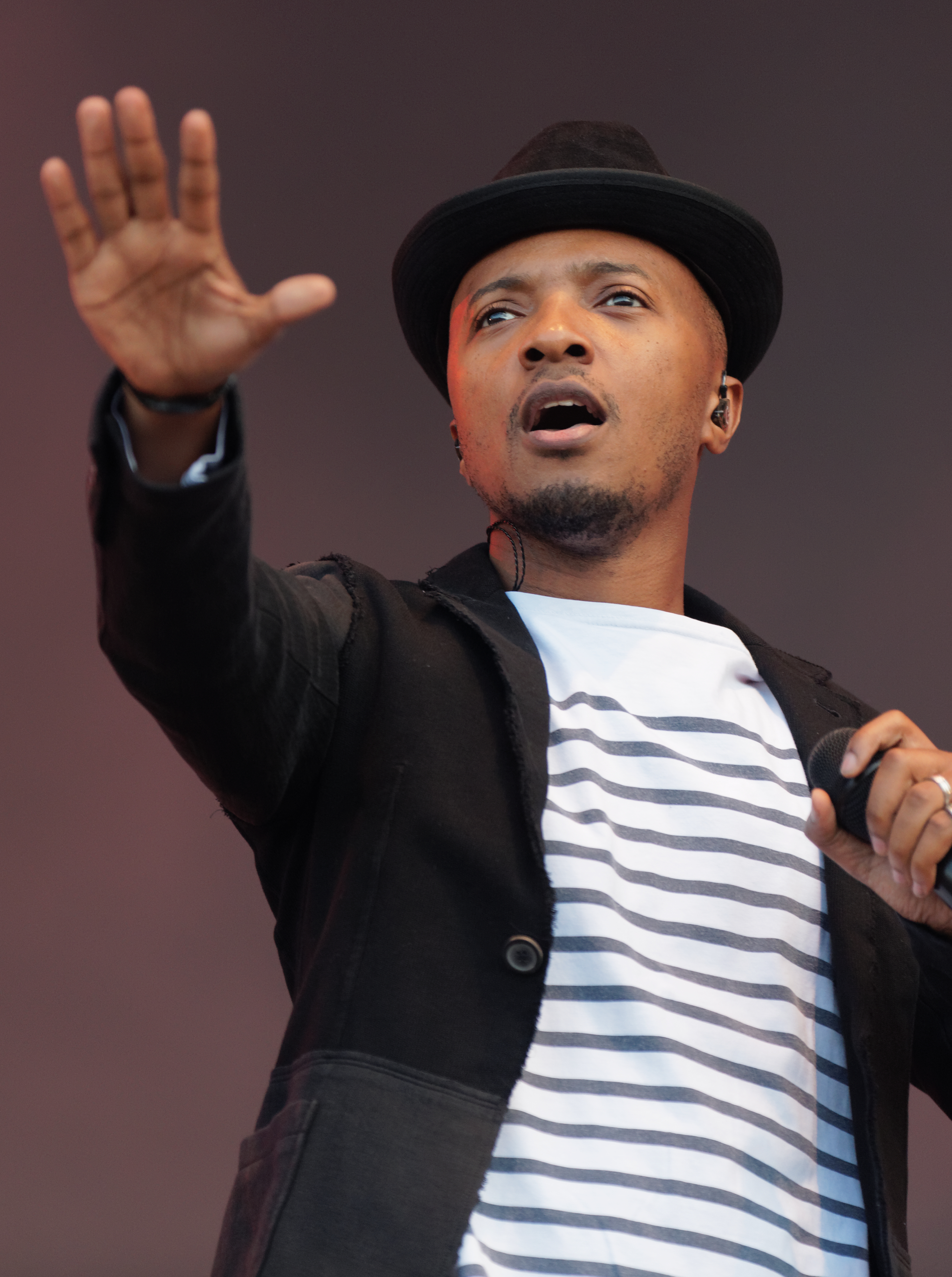
Soprano

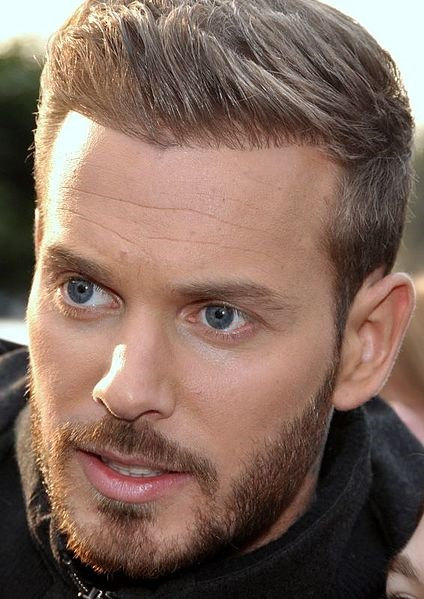
Matt Pokora

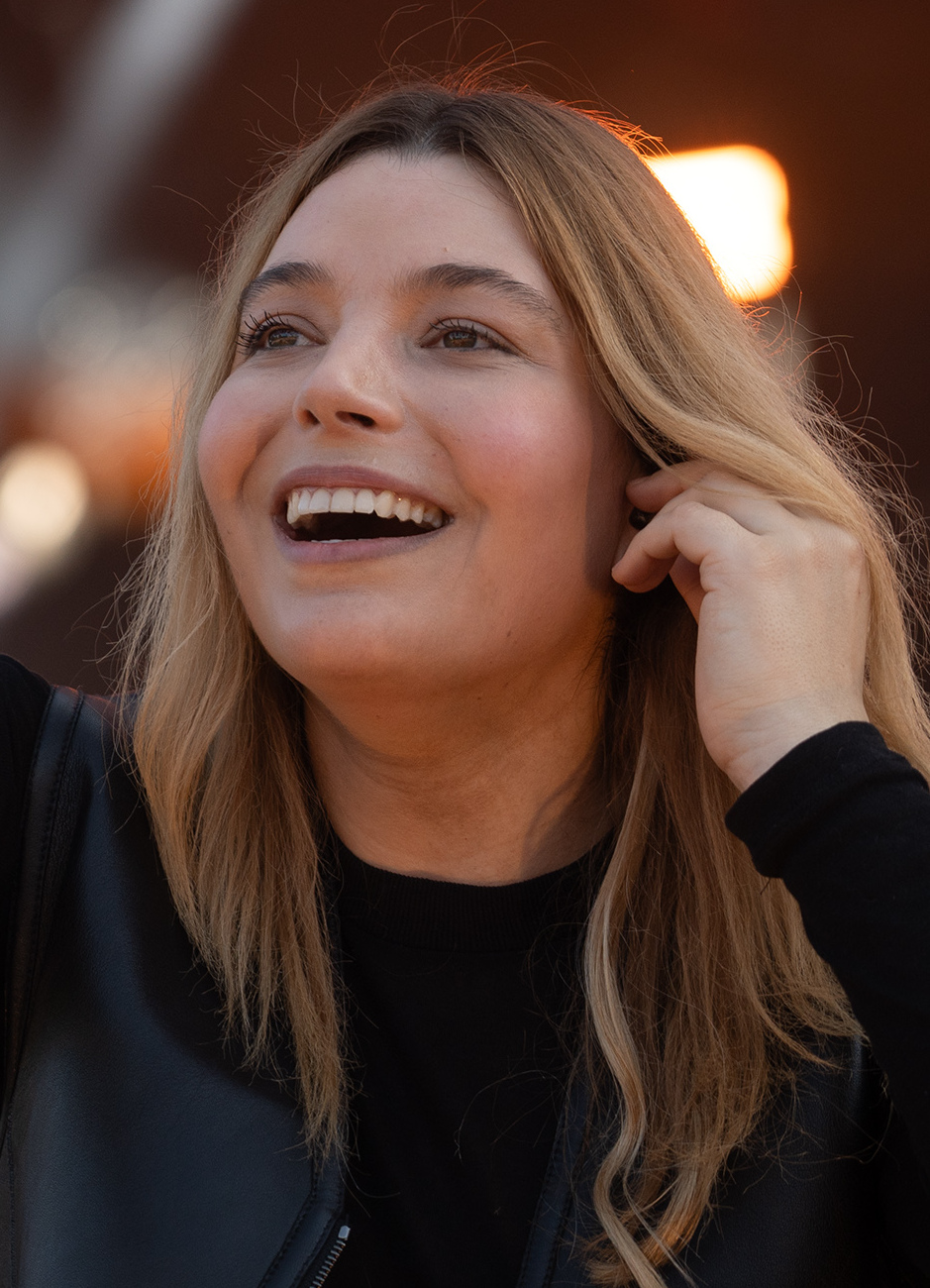
Santa

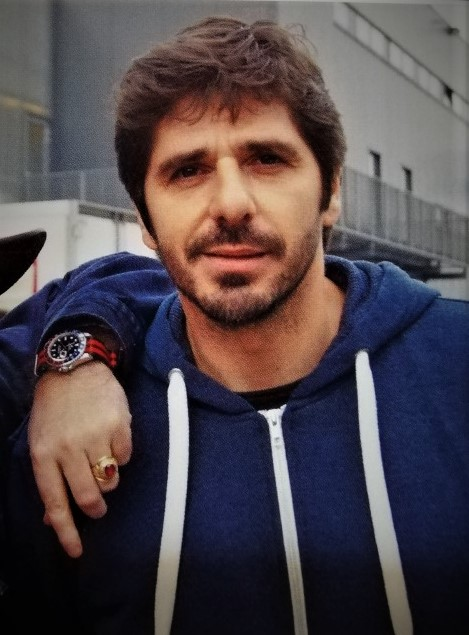
Patrick Fiori

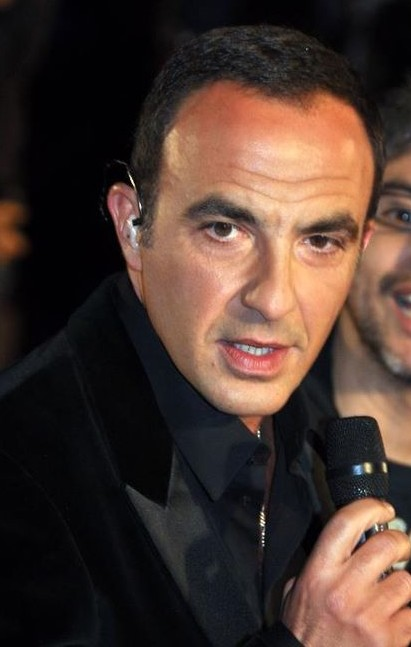
Nikos Aliagas (host)

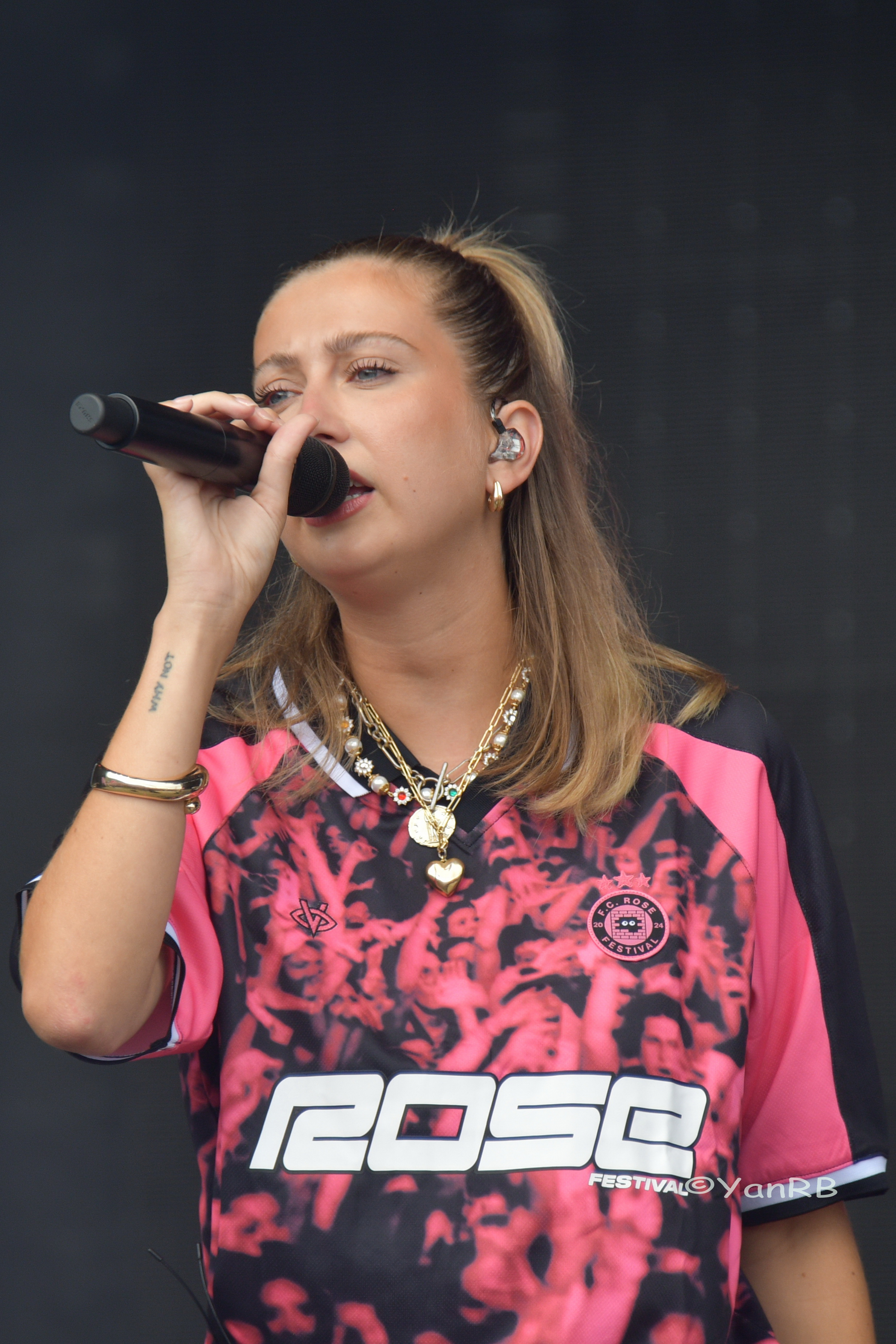
Styleto (backstage)

This season, all the coaches from the previous season: Soprano, Matt Pokora, Santa, and Patrick Fiori returned. Nikos Aliagas will once again host, and Styleto, a newcomer to the backstage team, takes over from Karine Ferri.

== Teams ==
Colour key

- Winner
- Runner-up
- Eliminated in the Final
- Eliminated in the Groups

Coaching teams
Coaches	Top 40 Artists			
Soprano				
Soprano	Léna	Élisa	Adélaïde	Aridane
Soprano	Jean	Seif	Victoire	Noémie
Soprano	Léonie	Arya		
Matt Pokora				
Matt Pokora	Nelson	Livia	Titouan	Lola
Matt Pokora	Enzo	Lily	Amandine	Li-Ya
Matt Pokora	Clément	Léo		
Santa				
Santa	Alec	Sophie	Ariana	Azure
Santa	Xan	Noam	Lola	Chamis
Santa	Maé	Maëlie		
Patrick Fiori				
Patrick Fiori	Jude	Joy	Lila	Juliette
Patrick Fiori	Mina	Juliette	Ambre	Jeanne
Patrick Fiori	Francescu & Ange	Julie		

== Blind Auditions ==
The principle is that each coach chooses the best candidates pre-selected by the production team. During each candidate's presentation, each judge and potential coach sits in a chair, with their back to the stage and facing the audience, listening to the candidate's voice without seeing them (hence the term "blind auditions"). When a judge believes they have a good candidate, they press a buzzer in front of them, which turns their chair so that they are facing the candidate. This means that the judge, having finally seen the candidate in person, is ready to coach them and wants them on their team. If only one judge turns their chair, the candidate automatically joins their team. However, if several judges turn their chair, the candidate can choose which coach they want to work with.

The "Block" rule is back this season. This rule allows a coach to block another coach until the final selection of the talent (i.e., it can still be used after the talent's presentation), instead of before the presentation. The coaches can only use this button once during all the blind auditions.

This season, the coaches will be able to propose challenges to each other. They will also have the option to "Call a Friend" to try and convince a contestant to join them, using a celebrity of their choice. That celebrity will then send a video message to the contestant in question.

Blind auditions color key
✔	Coach pressed "I WANT YOU" button
	Artist defaulted to this coach's team
	Artist elected to join this coach's team
	Artist was eliminated with no coach pressing their button
✘	Coach pressed "I WANT YOU" button, but was super-blocked by another coach from getting the artist
	Blocked by Soprano; Blocked by Matt; Blocked by Santa; Blocked by Patrick

=== Episode 1 (22 August) ===
First blind auditions results
Order	Artist	Age	Song	Coach's and artist's choices			
Order	Artist	Age	Song	Soprano	Matt	Santa	Patrick
1	Xan	9	"Recommence-moi"	✔	✔	✔	✘
2	Lila	14	"Hopelessly Devoted to You"	—	✔	—	✔
3	Juliette	15	"My Immortal"	✔	✔	✔	✔
4	Noam	13	"Ta peine"	✔	✔	✔	✔
5	Fleur	13	"Faut que tu m'aimes"	—	—	—	—
6	Jude	11	"Dis-moi que tu M'aimes"	✔	✔	✘	✔
7	Léna	14	"Ils me Rient Tous Au Nez"	✔	✔	✔	✔
8	Anas	10	"Cette année-là"	—	—	—	—
9	Aridane	13	"Set Fire to the Rain"	✔	—	—	—
10	Mina	10	"Fabulous, Baby!"	✔	✔	✔	✔
11	Louis	12	"Tout l'univers"	—	—	—	—
12	Amandine	15	"I Love You"	—	✔	—	—

=== Episode 2 (29 August) ===
Second blind auditions results
Order	Artist	Age	Song	Coach's and artist's choices			
Order	Artist	Age	Song	Soprano	Matt	Santa	Patrick
1	Ariana	14	"Where Is My Husband!"	✔	✔	✔	✔
2	Sorente	10	"Monday, Tuesday... Laissez-moi danser"	—	—	—	—
3	Joy	10	"La Rivière de notre enfance"	✔	✔	✔	✔
4	Nelson	14	"Una furtiva lagrima"	✔	✔	—	✔
5	Azure	9	"Don't Speak"	✔	✔	✔	✘
6	Ethane	14	"Ne me quitte pas"	—	—	—	—
7	Lisandro & Gaspard	12	"Est-ce que tu m'aimes?"	—	—	—	—
8	Léonie	9	"Melodrama"	✔	—	—	—
9	Titouan	13	"La quête"	✔	✔	✔	✔
10	Lisandro	8	"Le Pouvoir des fleurs"	—	—	—	—
11	Lola	13	"Le sens de la vie"	—	✔	—	—
12	Juliette	15	"L'âme du phœnix"	—	—	—	✔

=== Episode 3 (5 September) ===
Third blind auditions results
Order	Artist	Age	Song	Coach's and artist's choices			
Order	Artist	Age	Song	Soprano	Matt	Santa	Patrick
1	Adélaïde	12	"Merci"	✔	✔	✔	✔
2	Julian	8	"Le mal aimé"	—	—	—	—
3	Alec	12	"Éternel"	✔	✔	✔	✔
4	Sophie	7	"Je voudrais un bonhomme de neige"	✔	✔	✔	✔
5	Enzo	15	"Sans toi"	—	✔	—	—
6	Nova (Mila, Marilou, Alessio & Céleste)	10, 12 & 13	"L'Orange"	—	—	—	—
7	Lily	11	"Somewhere Only We Know"	—	✔	—	—
8	Ambre	14	"Ne retiens pas tes larmes"	—	✘	✔	✔
9	Ewann	10	"Allumer le feu"	—	—	—	—
10	Ariane	10	"Soirée mondaine"	—	—	—	—
11	Jean	13	"L'amour est un oiseau rebelle"	✔	—	—	—
12	Flavia	14	"Dynamite" / "Gangnam Style"	—	—	—	—

=== Episode 4 (12 September) ===
Fourth blind auditions results
Order	Artist	Age	Song	Coach's and artist's choices			
Order	Artist	Age	Song	Soprano	Matt	Santa	Patrick
1	Livia	13	"The Greatest"	✔	✔	✔	✔
2	Liam	9	"Les Bêtises"	—	—	—	—
3	Lola	15	"Aimer"	✔	✔	✔	✔
4	Chamis	15	"Les Mots bleus"	✔	✔	✔	✔
5	Quentin	13	"Allô le monde"	—	—	—	—
6	Jeanne	13	"Voyage, voyage"	✔	✔	✔	✔
7	Li-Ya	11	"Cups"	✔	✔	—	—
8	Lissy	8	"Jing Ju Wa"	—	—	—	—
9	Seif	13	"Monde"	✔	—	✔	—
10	Francescu & Ange	14	"Core timpesta"	—	—	—	✔
11	Axel	12	"Machistador"	—	—	—	—
12	Victoire	12	"Texas Hold 'Em"	✔	—	—	—

=== Episode 5 (19 September) ===
Fifth blind auditions results
Order	Artist	Age	Song	Coach's and artist's choices			
Order	Artist	Age	Song	Soprano	Matt	Santa	Patrick
1	Clément	14	"Vivre ou survivre"	✔	✔	—	✔
2	Noémie	12	"Ma révérence"	✔	—	—	—
3	Warren	14	"Reflet"	—	—	—	—
4	Maé	12	"Quand on n'a que l'amour"	✔	✔	✔	✔
5	Élise	7	"Pour louper l'école"	—	—	—	—
6	Élisa	9	"'O sole mio"	✔	—	—	—
7	Arya	10	"Ne me dis plus jamais"	✔	—	—	—
8	Zana	11	"Yaralarim"	Team full	—	—	—
9	Léo	13	"Maman s'inquiète"	✔^{1}	✔	—	—
10	Julie	7	"Maison"	Team full	Team full	—	✔
11	Léon	9	"Louxor, j'adore"	Team full	Team full	—	Team full
12	Maëlie	14	"Love in the Dark"	Team full	Team full	✔	Team full

- ^1 Although Soprano turned for Léo, he did not have a chance to obtain the artist due to his team being full; therefore, Léo was defaulted to Pokora's team.

== Group round ==
For this last stage before the final, the coaches formed two groups of five artists. Only one artist per group was selected for the final.

Marine was invited as a "Super Coach". She guided the kids and assisted the coaches in their choice. The coaches and Marine performed Dans un autre monde by Celine Dion during the round.

=== Episode 6 (26 September) ===
The candidate is chosen by his/her coach and qualifies for the Finals
The candidate is eliminated

Order	Coach	Group	Song	Result
1	Soprano	Adélaïde	"Regarde!"	Eliminated
1	Soprano	Arya	"Regarde!"	Eliminated
1	Soprano	Élisa	"Regarde!"	Qualified
1	Soprano	Jean	"Regarde!"	Eliminated
1	Soprano	Seif	"Regarde!"	Eliminated
2	Patrick Fiori	Ambre	"Chanter"	Eliminated
2	Patrick Fiori	Jeanne	"Chanter"	Eliminated
2	Patrick Fiori	Jude	"Chanter"	Qualified
2	Patrick Fiori	Juliette	"Chanter"	Eliminated
2	Patrick Fiori	Lila	"Chanter"	Eliminated
3	Matt Pokora	Clément	"Soirée mondaine" / "Get the Party Started" / "Alors on danse"	Eliminated
3	Matt Pokora	Enzo	"Soirée mondaine" / "Get the Party Started" / "Alors on danse"	Eliminated
3	Matt Pokora	Léo	"Soirée mondaine" / "Get the Party Started" / "Alors on danse"	Eliminated
3	Matt Pokora	Nelson	"Soirée mondaine" / "Get the Party Started" / "Alors on danse"	Qualified
3	Matt Pokora	Titouan	"Soirée mondaine" / "Get the Party Started" / "Alors on danse"	Eliminated
4	Santa	Alec	"Tu ne m'as pas laissé le temps"	Qualified
4	Santa	Azure	"Tu ne m'as pas laissé le temps"	Eliminated
4	Santa	Chamis	"Tu ne m'as pas laissé le temps"	Eliminated
4	Santa	Lola	"Tu ne m'as pas laissé le temps"	Eliminated
4	Santa	Maé	"Tu ne m'as pas laissé le temps"	Eliminated
5	Patrick Fiori	Francescu & Ange	"Les Jolies Colonies de vacances" / "Holiday" / "Les vacances au bord de la mer" / "Est-ce que tu viens pour les vacances ?" / "Les Sunlights des tropiques"	Eliminated
5	Patrick Fiori	Joy	"Les Jolies Colonies de vacances" / "Holiday" / "Les vacances au bord de la mer" / "Est-ce que tu viens pour les vacances ?" / "Les Sunlights des tropiques"	Qualified
5	Patrick Fiori	Julie	"Les Jolies Colonies de vacances" / "Holiday" / "Les vacances au bord de la mer" / "Est-ce que tu viens pour les vacances ?" / "Les Sunlights des tropiques"	Eliminated
5	Patrick Fiori	Juliette	"Les Jolies Colonies de vacances" / "Holiday" / "Les vacances au bord de la mer" / "Est-ce que tu viens pour les vacances ?" / "Les Sunlights des tropiques"	Eliminated
5	Patrick Fiori	Mina	"Les Jolies Colonies de vacances" / "Holiday" / "Les vacances au bord de la mer" / "Est-ce que tu viens pour les vacances ?" / "Les Sunlights des tropiques"	Eliminated
6	Santa	Ariana	"Les Rois du monde"	Eliminated
6	Santa	Maëlie	"Les Rois du monde"	Eliminated
6	Santa	Noam	"Les Rois du monde"	Eliminated
6	Santa	Sophie	"Les Rois du monde"	Qualified
6	Santa	Xan	"Les Rois du monde"	Eliminated
7	Soprano	Aridane	"Désenchantée"	Eliminated
7	Soprano	Léna	"Désenchantée"	Qualified
7	Soprano	Léonie	"Désenchantée"	Eliminated
7	Soprano	Noémie	"Désenchantée"	Eliminated
7	Soprano	Victoire	"Désenchantée"	Eliminated
8	Matt Pokora	Amandine	"Zoo"	Eliminated
8	Matt Pokora	Lily	"Zoo"	Eliminated
8	Matt Pokora	Livia	"Zoo"	Qualified
8	Matt Pokora	Lola	"Zoo"	Eliminated
8	Matt Pokora	Li-Ya	"Zoo"	Eliminated

==== Group round results ====
Qualified for the Finals
n°	Soprano	Matt Pokora	Santa	Patrick Fiori
1	Elisa	Nelson	Alec	Jude
2	Léna	Livia	Sophie	Joy

== The Finale ==
The two remaining contestants in each teams will perform individually, then their coach will decide who will move on to the "Super Finale". During the second part of the show, the four remaining contestants will perform in duets with Mentissa, RnBoi, Ycare, and Claudio Capéo.

The Finale is pre-recorded and the winner is chosen by the studio audience. This season is the first in the show's history to have an entirely recorded Finale.

=== Episode 7 (3 October) ===
==== Final ====
Final color key
Artist advanced to the final
Artist was eliminated

Épisode 7

Prestations de la 1st étape de la finale
Order	Coach	Talent	Song	Result
The Coaches and Finalists			Sorry - Justin Bieber; Melodrama - Disiz et Theodora; Chanson sur ma drôle de vie - Véronique Sanson; Le Dernier Jour du disco - Juliette Armanet	
1	Patrick Fiori	Jude	Hymne à l'amour - Édith Piaf	Qualified
1	Patrick Fiori	Joy	Les Feux d'artifice - Calogero	Eliminated
2	Soprano	Léna	Mamma Knows Best - Jessie J	Qualifiée
2	Soprano	Élisa	Ave Maria - Vladimir Vavilov	Éliminée
3	Santa	Sophie	L'Envie d'aimer - Daniel Lévi	Éliminée
3	Santa	Alec	Je t'aimais, je t'aime, je t'aimerai - Francis Cabrel	Qualifié
4	M. Pokora	Livia	Always Remember Us This Way - Lady Gaga	Éliminée
4	M. Pokora	Nelson	Le monde est stone - Fabienne Thibeault	Qualifié

==== Grand Final ====
In the grand final, each artist sung a duet with a guest artist as his/her final performance

Grand Final color key
Winner
Runner-up

Prestations de la 2nd étape de la finale
Ordre	Coach	Candidat	Chanson	En duo	Classement final
1	Patrick Fiori	Jude	Animaux fragiles - Ycare et Zaz	Ycare	Super-finaliste
2	Santa	Alec	Et Bam - Mentissa	Mentissa	Super-finaliste
3	M. Pokora	Nelson	Mon bébé - RnBoi	RnBoi	Gagnant
4	Soprano	Léna	Si j'avais su - Claudio Capéo	Claudio Capéo	Super-finaliste
