= NEJ =

NEJ, Nej, or nej may refer to:

- Nej, a village in Karnataka state, India
- Nejmeh SC, a football club from Beirut, Lebanon
- Nejjo Airport, an airport in Nejo, Ethiopia, by IATA code
- Nej Adamson (born 1958), a British actor
- Nej', a French singer who released the 2021 song Paro
- Neko language, the native language of a single village in Papua New Guinea, by ISO 639 code
- A word meaning no in Swedish; see Yes and no#Three-form systems
- Naval Engineers Journal, a quarterly journal published by the American Society of Naval Engineers

== See also ==
- Ney (disambiguation)
