= The Voice Kids (French TV series) season 10 =

The Voice Kids
- Season 10
- Hosted by: Karine Ferri; Nikos Aliagas
- Coaches: Slimane; Lara Fabian; Claudio Capéo; Patrick Fiori
- Winner: Tim Houdaille
- Winning coach: Lara Fabian
- Runner-up: Coline

Release
- Original network: TF1
- Original release: 17 August – 5 October 2024

Season chronology
- Next → Season 11

The tenth season of French The Voice Kids is a talent show broadcast on TF1, which premiered on 17 August 2024. Two coaches from the previous season returned this season: Slimane and Patrick Fiori. In the meantime, Kendji Girac and Nolwenn Leroy were replaced by Claudio Capéo and former The Voice coach Lara Fabian. Karine Ferri and Nikos Aliagas both returned the hosts of the season.

Tim Houdaille from Team Lara won the season on 5 October, marking Lara Fabian's first (and only) win as a coach. Fabian became the fourth coach to win on their debut season, following Patrick Fiori, Matt Pokora, and Slimane.

== Coaches ==
Coaches of The Voice Kids France Season 10

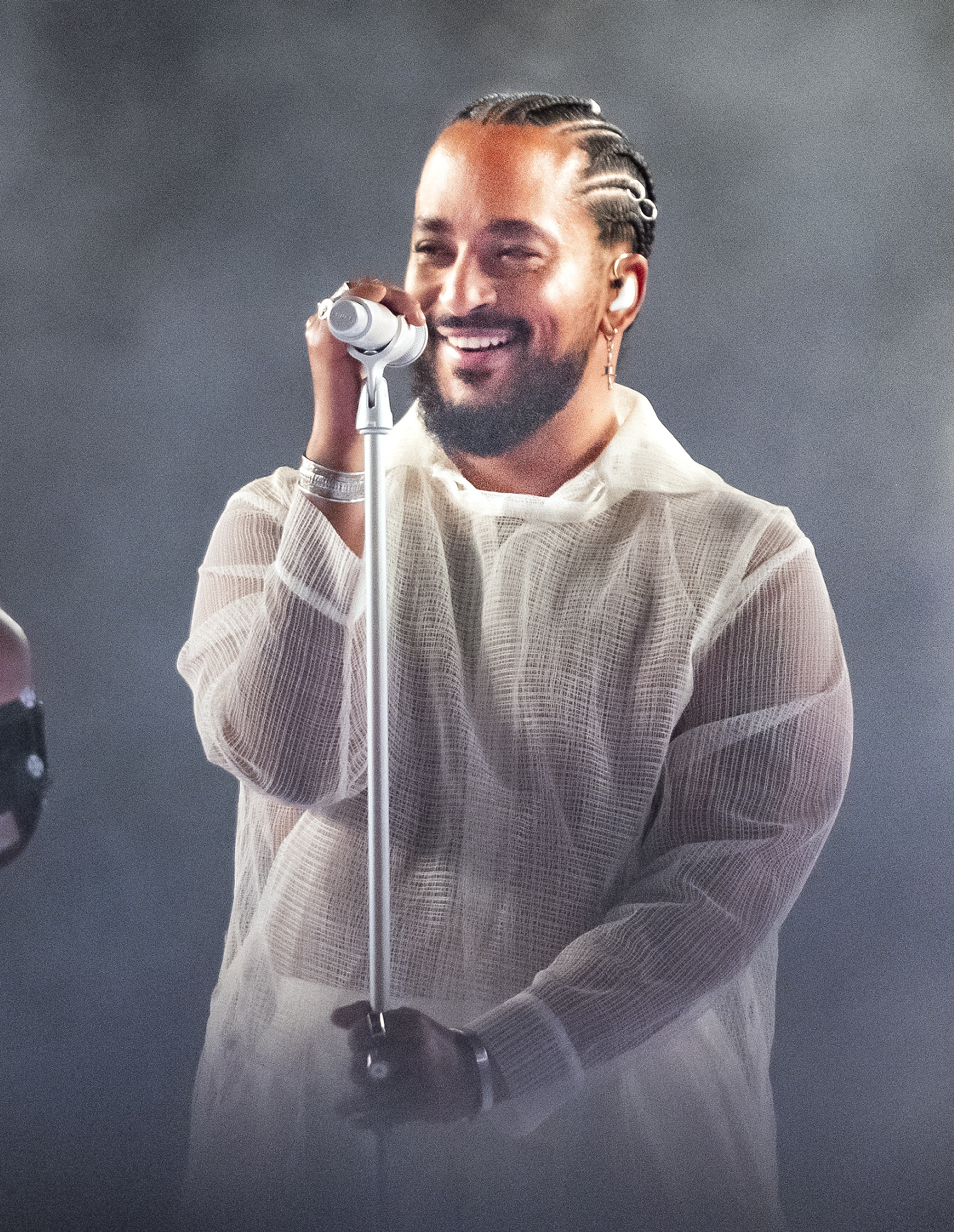
Slimane

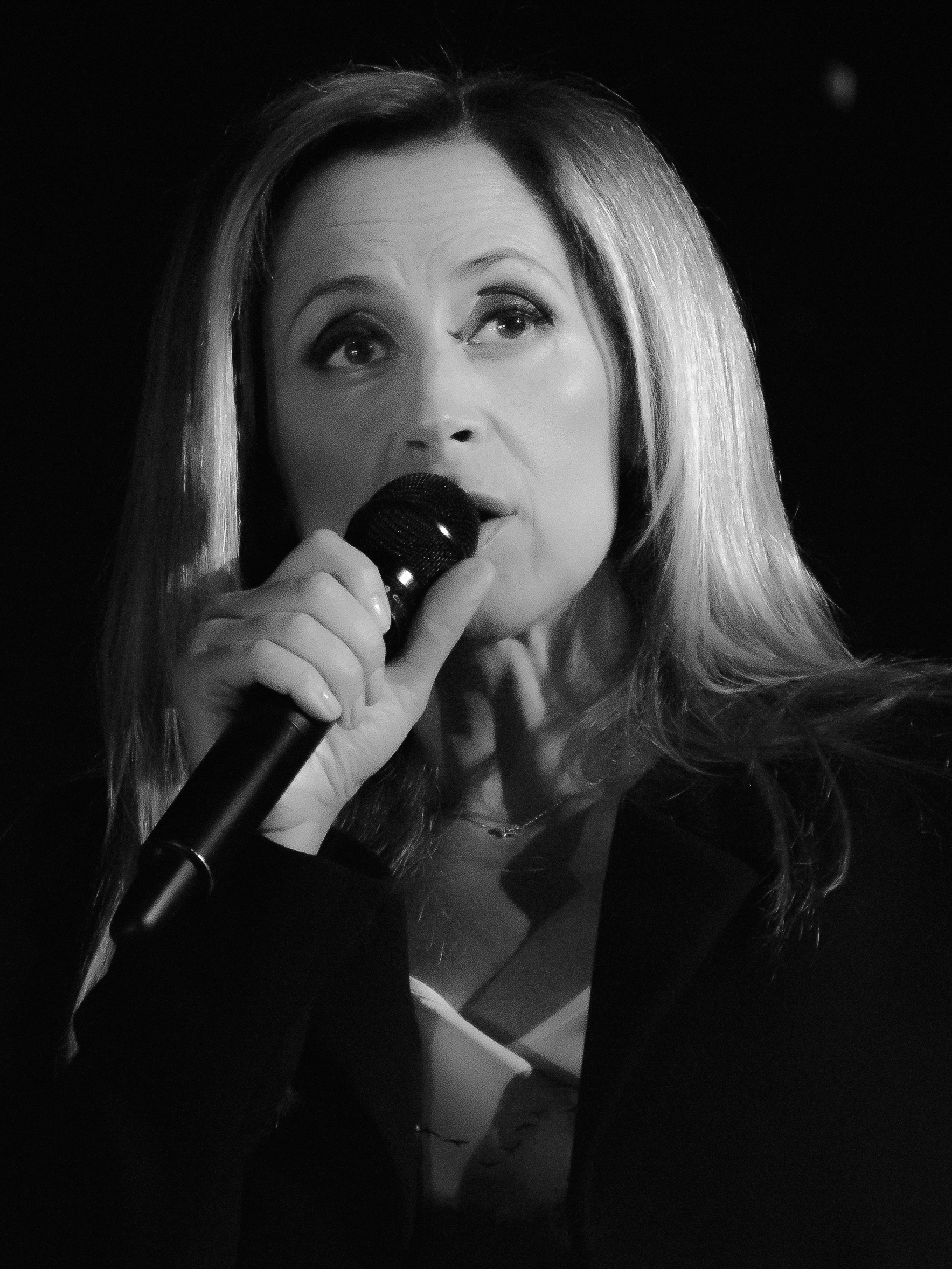
Lara Fabian

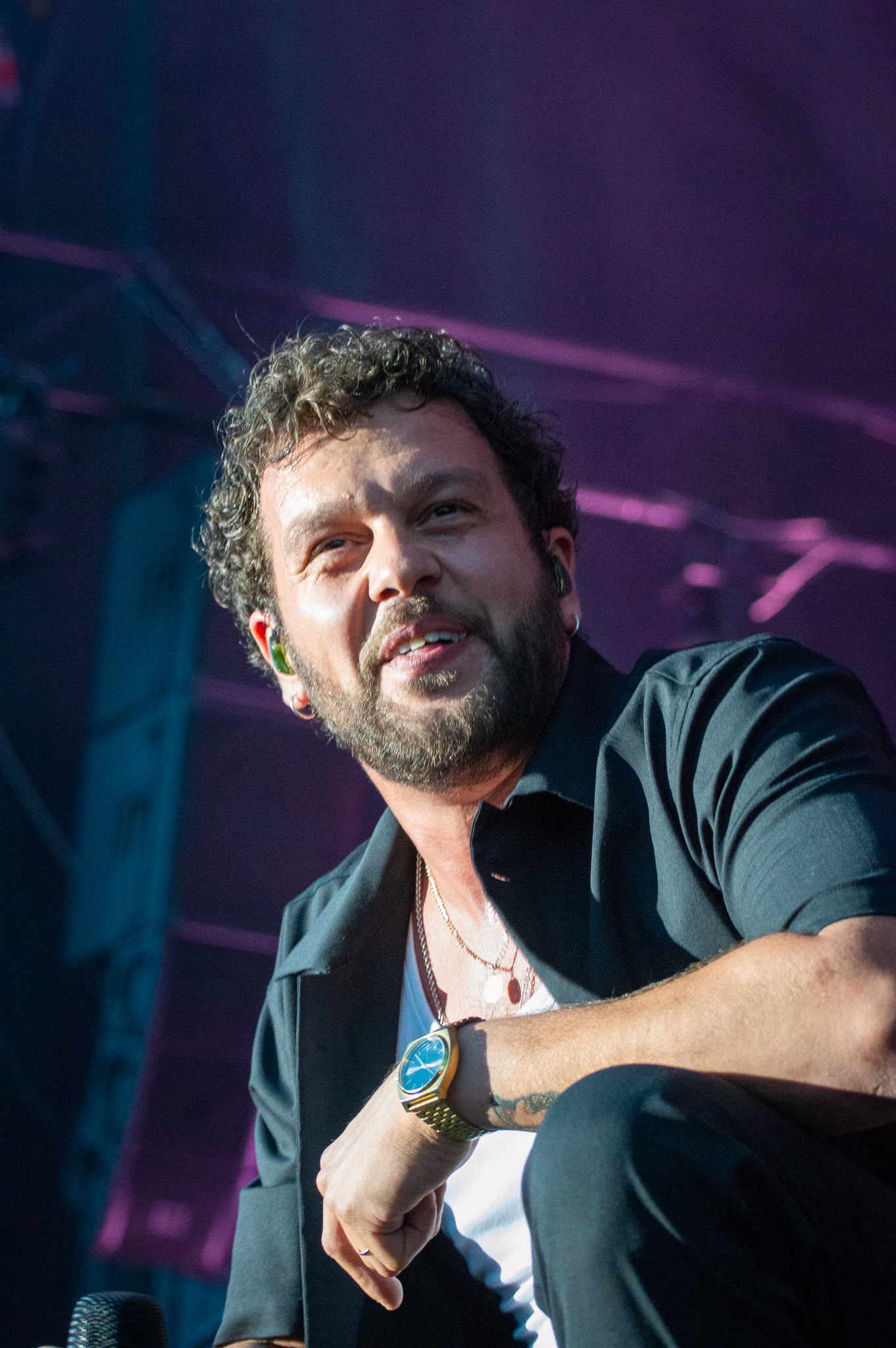
Claudio Capéo

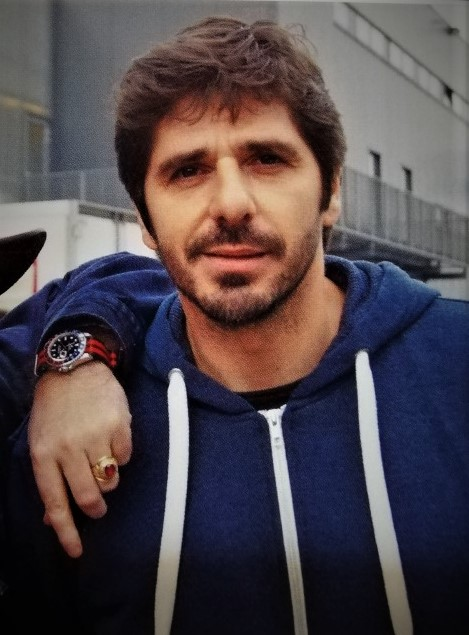
Patrick Fiori

On 23 October 2023, it was revealed via social media that of the coaches last season, Slimane and Patrick Fiori would return for their second and ninth seasons, respectively. At the same time, it was revealed that Lara Fabian, who previously served as a coach on the ninth season of the adults' version of the show, would replace Nolwenn Leroy. Claudio Capéo was announced to replace Kendji Girac.

== Teams ==
Colour key

- Winner
- Runner-up
- Third place
- Eliminated in the Semi-final
- Eliminated in the Battles

Coaching teams
Coaches	Top 48 Artists					
Slimane						
Slimane	Coline	Antoine	Lenny	Rafael	Baptiste	Éline & Naël
Slimane	Israël	Livanni	Loucia	Noéline, Lowen & Eloane	Victoria	Yohan
Lara Fabian						
Lara Fabian	Tim	Arianna	Loan	Yuliia	Aminata	Elisabetta
Lara Fabian	Emma	Hugo	Izalyne	Louise	Marylou	Scarlett
Claudio Capéo						
Claudio Capéo	Louis Collet-Goeury	Giuliana	Inès	Louis D.	Ambroise	Giulia
Claudio Capéo	Liam C.	Loan O.	Louanne	Mattia	Noham	Tymao
Patrick Fiori						
Patrick Fiori	April	Célia	Charlie	Lizzie	Anastasia	Charles
Patrick Fiori	Ella	Jean	Kiss Kids	Salomé	Samara	Yasmine

== Blind auditions ==
In the blind auditions, the four coaches are turned in a chair from the singer on the stage (hence the term "blind auditions"). When the coach wants to work with the artist, they press a buzzer in front of them, which then turns the chair to face the candidate, which means that the juror, who finally physically pushed the buzzer the candidate, is ready to coach the candidate and wants them on their team. If the coach is the only one to have turned around, then the artist goes by default to their team. On the other hand, if several coaches turn around, it is then up to the artist to choose which coach they want to join.

The "Super Block" rule is renewed this season. This rule allows a coach to block another coach until the final choice of the talent (therefore still usable after the talent's performance) and no longer before the latter turns around.

Blind auditions color key
✔	Coach pressed "I WANT YOU" button
	Artist defaulted to this coach's team
	Artist elected to join this coach's team
	Artist was eliminated with no coach pressing their button
✘	Coach pressed "I WANT YOU" button, but was super-blocked by another coach from getting the artist
	Blocked by Slimane; Blocked by Lara; Blocked by Claudio; Blocked by Patrick

=== Episode 1 (17 August) ===
First blind auditions results
Order	Artist	Age	Song	Coach's and artist's choices			
Order	Artist	Age	Song	Slimane	Lara	Claudio	Patrick
1	Elisabetta	13	"Sarà perché ti amo"	✔	✔	✔	✔
2	Loan O.	11	"L'Enfer"	✔	✔	✔	✔
3	Emma	14	"Writing's on the Wall"	✔	✔	✔	✘
4	Liam	7	"Santiano"	–	–	–	–
5	Baptiste	11	"Highway to Hell"	✔	–	✔	–
6	Yasmine	10–11	"Lily"	✔	✔	✔	✔
7	Antoine	10	"Voilà"	✔	✔	✔	✔
8	Timothé	15	"La Quête"	–	–	–	–
9	Yuliia	15	"History Repeating"	✔	✔	✔	✔
10	Kiss Kids	11–14	"Heaven's on Fire"	–	–	✔	✔
11	Coline	15	"Rise Up"	✔	✔	✔	✔
12	Noham	12	"Sunday Morning"	–	–	✔	–
13	Romane	10	"Derrière le brouillard"	–	–	–	–
14	Lizzie	14	"Je suis malade"	–	–	✔	✔

=== Episode 2 (24 August) ===
Second blind auditions results
Order	Artist	Age	Song	Coach's and artist's choices			
Order	Artist	Age	Song	Slimane	Lara	Claudio	Patrick
1	Louise	12	"I Put a Spell on You"	✔	✔	–	–
2	Louis Collet-Goeury	14	"Si j'avais su"	✔	✔	✔	✔
3	Emy	15	"Ain't Nobody"	–	–	–	–
4	Salomé	8	"T'en va pas"	✔	✔	✔	✔
5	Samara	11	"Eaea"	✘	✔	✔	✔
6	Loan	11	"Le Portrait"	–	✔	–	–
7	Loucia	11	"Mon cœur, mon amour"	✔	–	–	–
8	Scarlett	11	"L'Effet de masse"	✔	✔	✔	✔
9	Ethan	11	"Les Champs-Élysées"	–	–	–	–
10	Célia	13	"Love in the Dark"	–	✔	–	✔
11	Liam C.	9	"Si, maman si"	–	–	✔	–
12	Arianna	14	"It's a Man's Man's Man's World"	–	✔	✔	✔
13	Giulia	11	"Je reviens te chercher"	–	–	✔	–
14	Noa	11	"Y'a du soleil"	–	–	–	–
15	Victoria	14	"Qu'importe"	✔	✔	✔	✔

=== Episode 3 (31 August) ===
Third blind auditions results
Order	Artist	Age	Song	Coach's and artist's choices			
Order	Artist	Age	Song	Slimane	Lara	Claudio	Patrick
1	Yohan	14	"I'm Still Standing"	✔	✔	–	–
2	Giuliana	13	"Vie d'artiste"	✔	✔	✔	✔
3	Charles	11	"Rolling in the Deep"	–	–	–	✔
4	Lenny	12	"Voilà"	✔	✔	✔	✔
5	Clara	14	"Ceux qui rêvent"	–	–	–	–
6	Jean	12	"Chanson sur ma drôle de vie"	✔	–	✔	✔
7	Aminata	15	"L'Histoire de la vie"	✔	✔	✔	✘
8	Tim	12	"Creep"	✔	✔	✔	✔
9	Louanne	11	"Parle à ta tête"	–	–	✔	–
10	Aïden	13	"Mesdames"	–	–	–	–
11	Ella	9	"Le Tourbillon"	✔	✔	✔	✔
12	Éline & Naël	11 & 10	"XY"	✔	✔	✔	✔
13	Lisa	9	"Il est un coin de France"	–	–	–	–
14	Rafael	13	"Gangsta's Paradise"	✔	✔	✔	✔
15	Mattia	13	"Popcorn salé"	–	–	✔	–

=== Episode 4 (7 September) ===
Fourth blind auditions results
Order	Artist	Age	Song	Coach's and artist's choices			
Order	Artist	Age	Song	Slimane	Lara	Claudio	Patrick
1	Anastasia	14	"Don't Rain on My Parade"	✔	✔	✔	✔
2	Louis D.	14	"Casting"	–	✔	✔	✔
3	Marylou	13	"American Boy"	–	✔	–	–
4	Laïna	12	"Meu Pai, c'est mon père"	–	–	–	–
5	Livanni	13	"Le Chanteur"	✔	–	✔	–
6	Israël	12	"lovely"	✔	✘	✔	✔
7	Hugo	13	"Si seulement je pouvais lui manquer"	–	✔	✔	–
8	Charlie	7	"Dommage"	–	–	✔	✔
9	Izalyne	12	"River Deep, Mountain High"	–	✔	–	–
10	Ambroise	15	"Roméo kiffe Juliette"	–	Team full	✔	✔
11	Juliette	9	"La Bikina"	–	Team full	–	–
12	Tymao	12	"Forrest"	–	Team full	✔	✔
13	Noéline, Lowen & Éloane	11, 10 & 13	"Barracuda"	✔	Team full	✔	✔
14	Inès	12	"Mon idole"	Team full	Team full	✔	✔
15	April	12	"Pardonne-moi"	Team full	Team full	Team full	✔

== Battles ==
Within their team, each coach formed trios of candidates, to sing a song chosen by the coach. Each coach is supported by two advisors in the coaching: Dadju and Chimène Badi for Team Slimane, Garou and Tayc for Team Lara, Quentin Mosimann and Arnaud Ducret for Team Claudio, and Santa and Patrick Bruel for Team Patrick.

Battles color key
Artist was saved by his/her coach and advanced to the semi-final
Artist was eliminated

=== Episode 5 (14 September) ===
Order	Coach	Winner	Song	Losers
1	Lara Fabian	Yuliia	"Dans un autre monde"	Aminata
1	Lara Fabian	Yuliia	"Dans un autre monde"	Emma
2	Claudio Capéo	Louis D.	"Amsterdam"	Loan O.
2	Claudio Capéo	Louis D.	"Amsterdam"	Mattia
3	Patrick Fiori	Charlie	"Les Bêtises"	Ella
3	Patrick Fiori	Charlie	"Les Bêtises"	Salomée
4	Slimane	Rafael	"Cry Me a River"	Israël
4	Slimane	Rafael	"Cry Me a River"	Yohan
5	Claudio Capéo	Louis	"L'Amour"	Louanne
5	Claudio Capéo	Louis	"L'Amour"	Tymao
6	Lara Fabian	Tim	"Un homme heureux"	Louise
6	Lara Fabian	Tim	"Un homme heureux"	Scarlett
7	Patrick Fiori	Lizzie	"La Groupie du pianiste"	Charles
7	Patrick Fiori	Lizzie	"La Groupie du pianiste"	Jean
8	Slimane	Antoine	"Je partirai"	Noéline, Lowen & Éloane
8	Slimane	Antoine	"Je partirai"	Livanni

=== Episode 6 (21 September) ===
Order	Coach	Winner	Song	Losers
1	Patrick Fiori	Célia	"Prière païenne"	Anastasia
1	Patrick Fiori	Célia	"Prière païenne"	Samara
2	Lara Fabian	Arianna	"I Will Survive"	Elisabetta
2	Lara Fabian	Arianna	"I Will Survive"	Izalyne
3	Slimane	Coline	"Always Remember Us This Way"	Baptiste
3	Slimane	Coline	"Always Remember Us This Way"	Victoria
4	Claudio Capéo	Giuliana	"Comment on fait"	Giulia
4	Claudio Capéo	Giuliana	"Comment on fait"	Noham
5	Lara Fabian	Loan	"Savoir aimer"	Hugo
5	Lara Fabian	Loan	"Savoir aimer"	Marylou
6	Claudio Capéo	Inès	"Mistral gagnant"	Ambroise
6	Claudio Capéo	Inès	"Mistral gagnant"	Liam C.
7	Patrick Fiori	April	"Si l'on s'aimait, si"	Yasmine
7	Patrick Fiori	April	"Si l'on s'aimait, si"	Kiss Kids
8	Slimane	Lenny	"Monday Tuesday... Laissez moi danser"	Éline & Naël
8	Slimane	Lenny	"Monday Tuesday... Laissez moi danser"	Loucia

== Semi-final ==
In the semi-final, the remaining four artists on each coach's team perform for one spot per team in the final. Each coach selects only one artist to move on to the final, while the other three are eliminated. In total, four artists move on the final.

Semi-final color key
Artist was saved by his/her coach and advanced to the final
Artist was eliminated

=== Episode 7 (28 September) ===
Order	Coach	Artist	Song
1	Claudio Capéo	Giuliana	"Je t'aime"
2	Claudio Capéo	Louis D.	"Ma gueule"
3	Claudio Capéo	Inès	"Vole"
4	Claudio Capéo	Louis	"Mon amour"
5	Lara Fabian	Arianna	"I Have Nothing"
6	Lara Fabian	Loan	"Diego libre dans sa tête"
7	Lara Fabian	Yuliia	"Anyone"
8	Lara Fabian	Tim	"Another Love"
9	Patrick Fiori	April	"Et même après je t'aimerai"
10	Patrick Fiori	Charlie	"Riche"
11	Patrick Fiori	Célia	"Premier amour"
12	Patrick Fiori	Lizzie	"Memory"
13	Slimane	Rafael	"Golden Hour"
14	Slimane	Coline	"Peurs"
15	Slimane	Antoine	"SOS d'un terrien en détresse"
16	Slimane	Lenny	"La vie ne m'apprend rien"

== Final ==
In the final, the remaining four artists each performs a solo song, duet with a special guest, and duet with their coach. The audience then votes for the winner. Tim from Team Lara was declared the winner, making Lara Fabian the winning coach on her first season.

=== Episode 8 (5 October) ===
Final performances
Coach	Order	Talent	Song	Duo performance	Result
Patrick Fiori	1	April	"Ma révolution"	Jenifer	Third place
Patrick Fiori	8	April	"Écris l'histoire"	—	Third place
Patrick Fiori	11	April	"Les Feux d'artifice"	Patrick Fiori	Third place
Lara Fabian	2	Tim	"Qui a le droit"	Patrick Bruel	Winner
Lara Fabian	6	Tim	"Popcorn salé"	—	Winner
Lara Fabian	9	Tim	"Mistral gagnant"	Lara Fabian	Winner
Slimane	3	Coline	"Quand on n'a que l'amour"	—	Runner-up
Slimane	5	Coline	"Corps"	Yseult	Runner-up
Slimane	10	Coline	"Chanter"	Slimane	Runner-up
Claudio Capéo	4	Louis	"Beautiful Things"	—	Third place
Claudio Capéo	7	Louis	"Un homme"	Jérémy Frérot	Third place
Claudio Capéo	12	Louis	"Elle est d'ailleurs"	Claudio Capéo	Third place
