= The Voice Kids (French TV series) =

French television program

- Genre: Reality television
- Created by: John de Mol Jr.
- Presented by: Nikos Aliagas Karine Ferri
- Judges: Patrick Fiori (2–) Soprano (5–7, 11–) Matt Pokora (3–4, 11–) Santa (11–) Former judges Garou (1) Louis Bertignac (1–2) Amel Bent (5–6) Jenifer (1–7) Louane (8) Julien Doré (8) Kendji Girac (7–9) Nolwenn Leroy (9) Slimane (9–10) Lara Fabian (10) Claudio Capéo (10)
- Country of origin: France
- No. of seasons: 11
- No. of episodes: 76

Production
- Running time: 120 minutes

Original release
- Network: TF1
- Release: 23 August 2014 – present

Related
- The Voice: la plus belle voix The Voice (franchise)

The Voice Kids is a French music talent show for aspiring singers aged 6 to 15, based on the show The Voice: la plus belle voix. The first broadcast took place on 23 August 2014 on TF1. Unlike the adult version, during seasons 1 to 4, there were only three coaches. From season 5 onward, a fourth coach was added, following the adaptation of the original Dutch version.

There have been twelve winners: Carla Georges, Jane Constance, Manuela Diaz, Angélina Nava, Emma Cerchi, Soan Arhimann, Rébecca Sayaque, Raynaud Sadon, Durel Loumouamou, Tim Houdaille, Charlotte Deseigne, and Nelson Charles.

The original panel featured Jenifer, Louis Bertignac and Garou; the panel for the twelfth season featured Patrick Fiori, Soprano, Matt Pokora and Santa. Other coaches that have appeared in previous seasons include Amel Bent, Kendji Girac, Julien Doré, Louane, Nolwenn Leroy, Slimane, Lara Fabian, and Claudio Capéo.

== Coaches and presenters ==
Seasons
Coach
Coach	1	2	3	4	5	6	7	8	9	10	11	12
Louis Bertignac												
Jenifer												
Garou												
Patrick Fiori												
Matt Pokora												
Amel Bent												
Soprano												
Kendji Girac												
Julien Doré												
Louane												
Slimane												
Nolwenn Leroy												
Lara Fabian												
Claudio Capéo												
Santa												

== Gallery ==
Coaches gallery

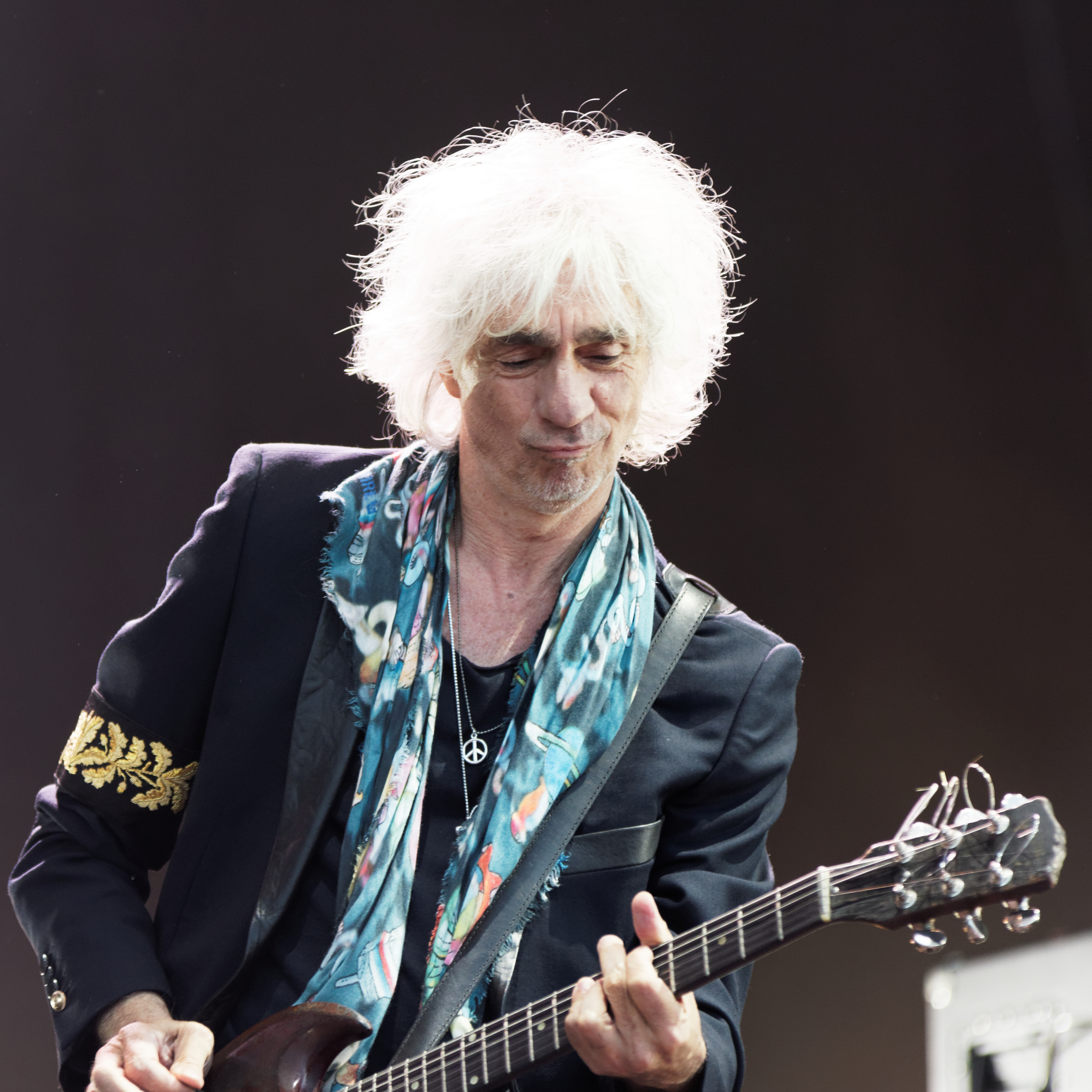
Louis Bertignac ( 1 - 2 )

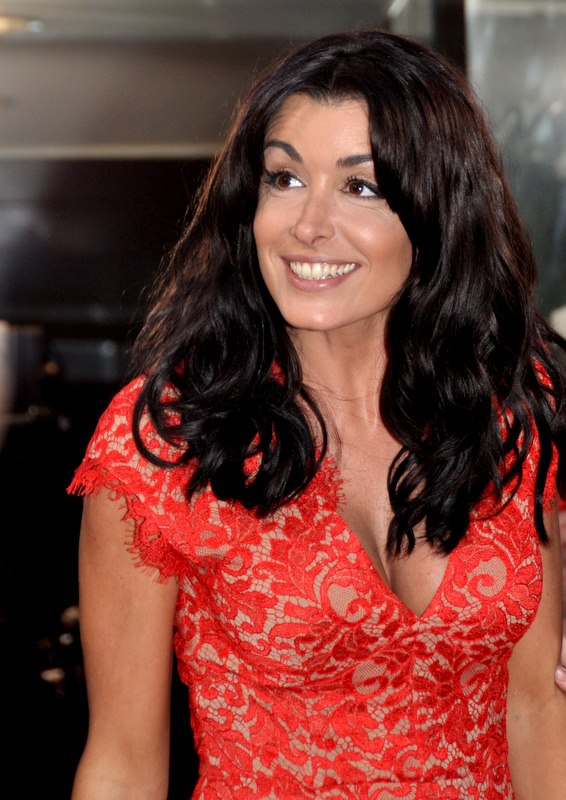
Jenifer ( 1 - 7 )

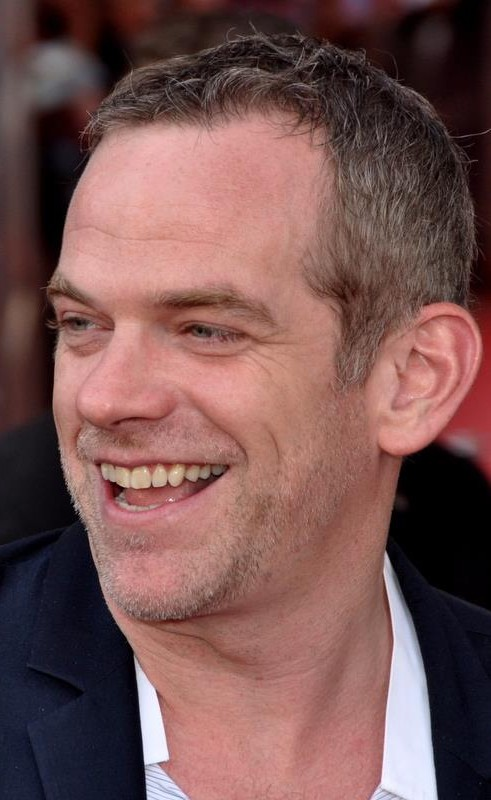
Garou ( 1 )

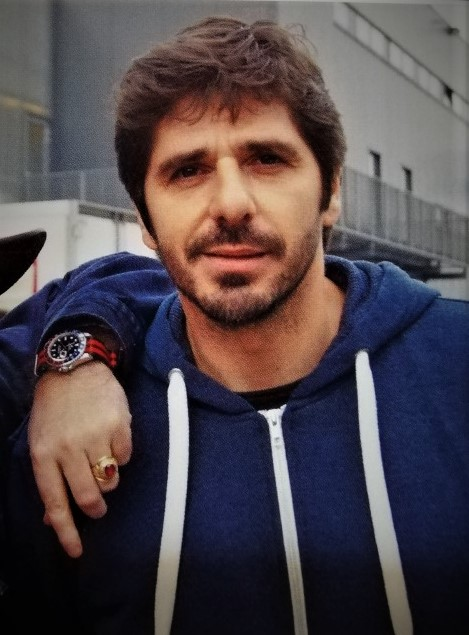
Patrick Fiori ( 2 - present )

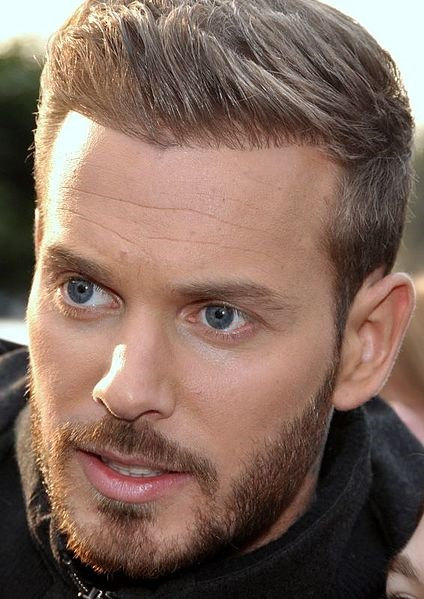
Matt Pokora ( 3 - 4, 11 - present )

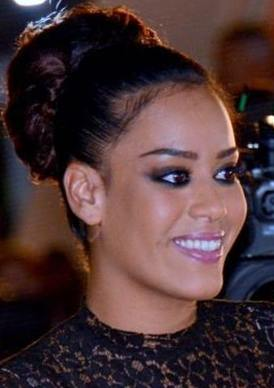
Amel Bent ( 5 - 6 )

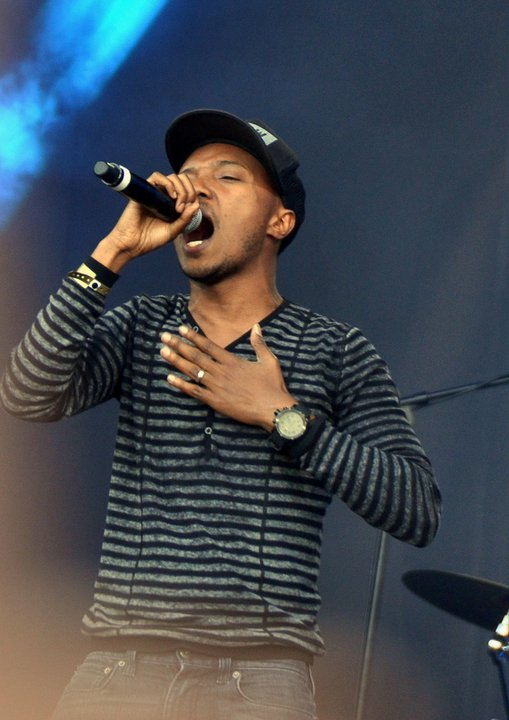
Soprano ( 5 - 7, 11 - present )

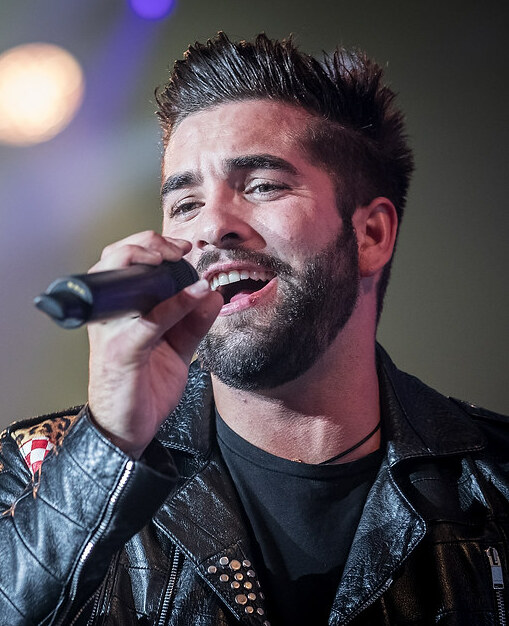
Kendji Girac ( 7 - 9 )

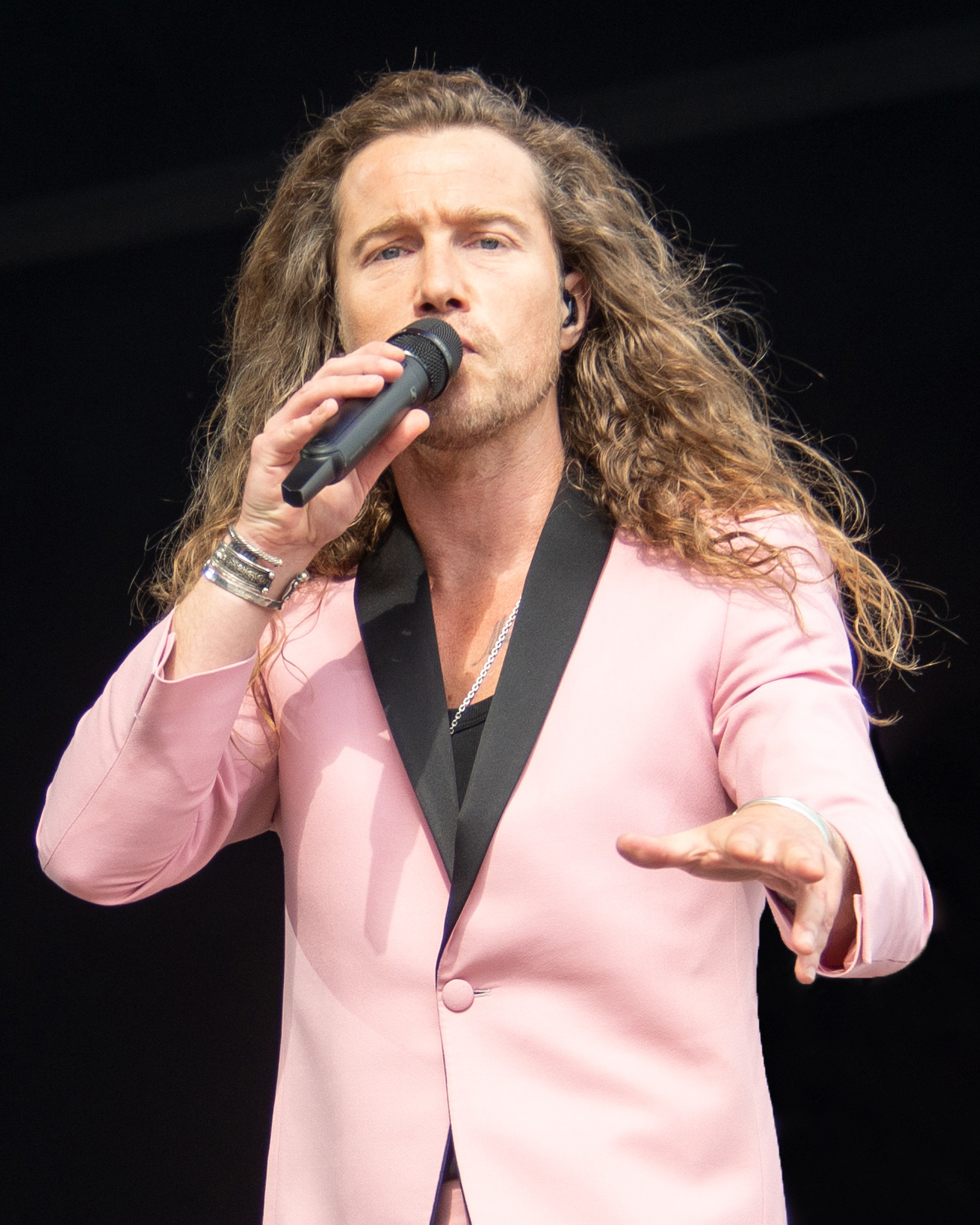
Julien Doré ( 8 )

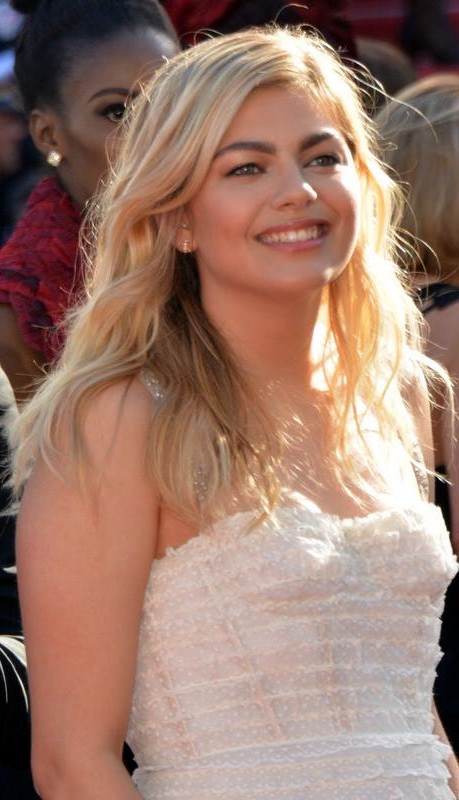
Louane ( 8 )

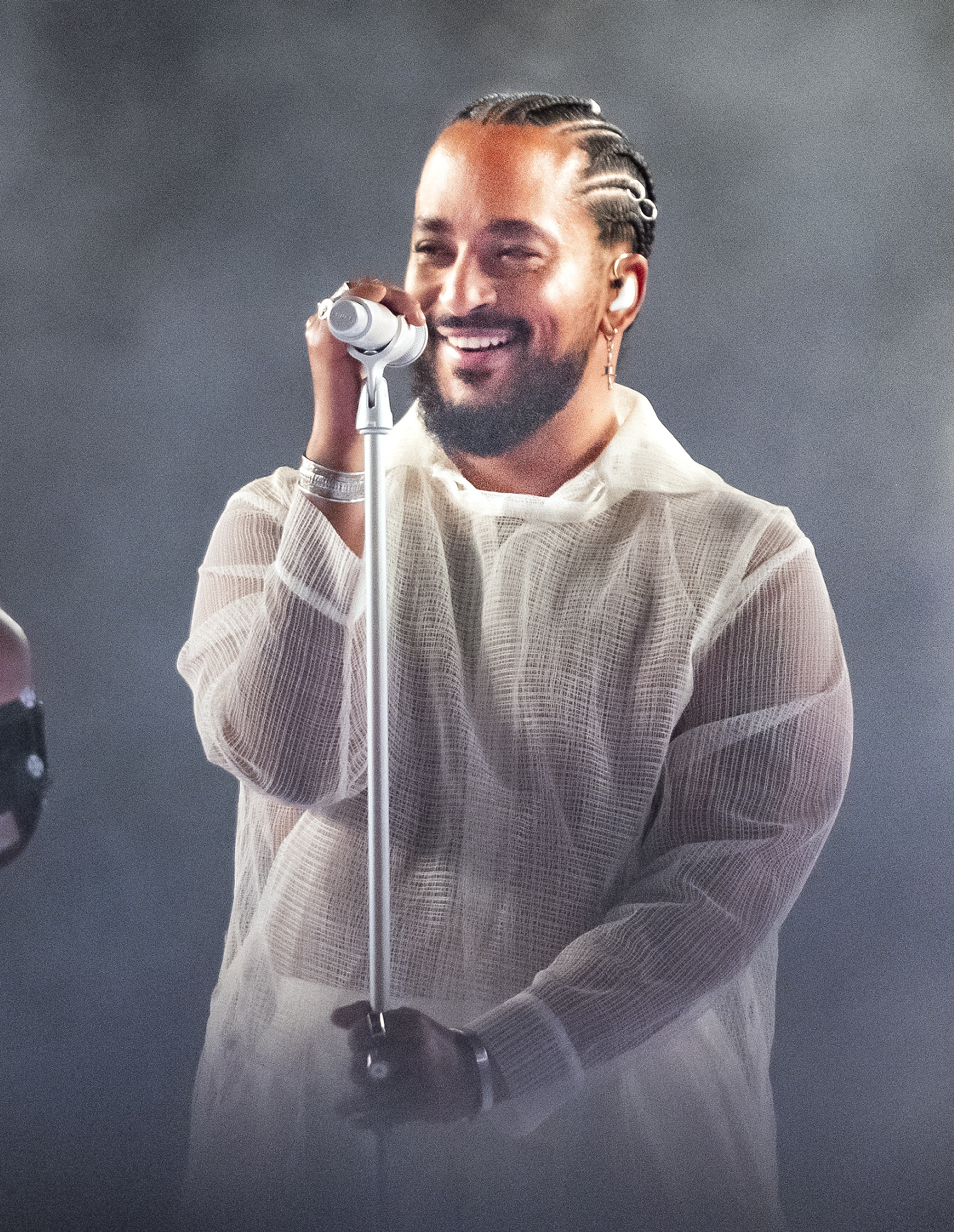
Slimane ( 9 - 10 )

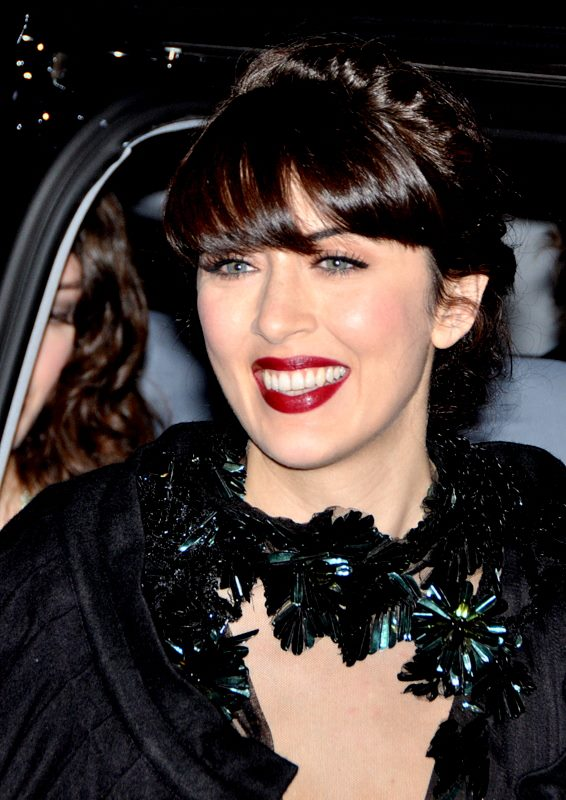
Nolwenn Leroy ( 9 )

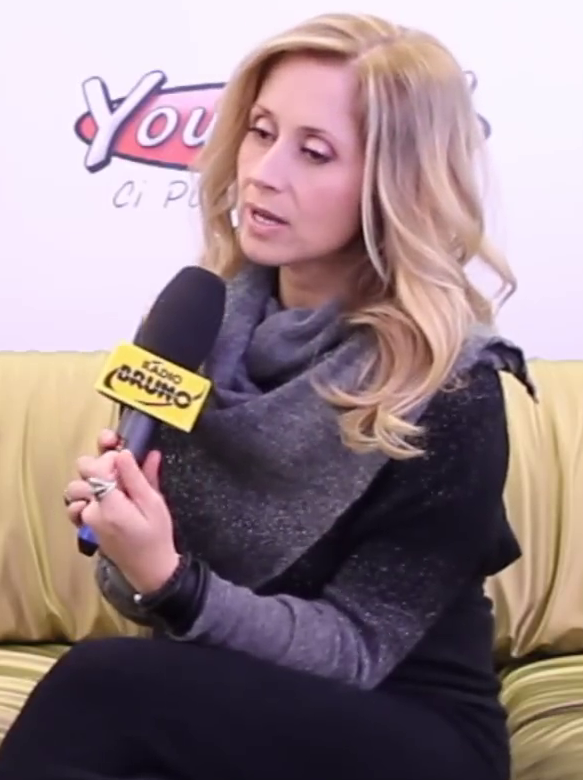
Lara Fabian ( 10 )

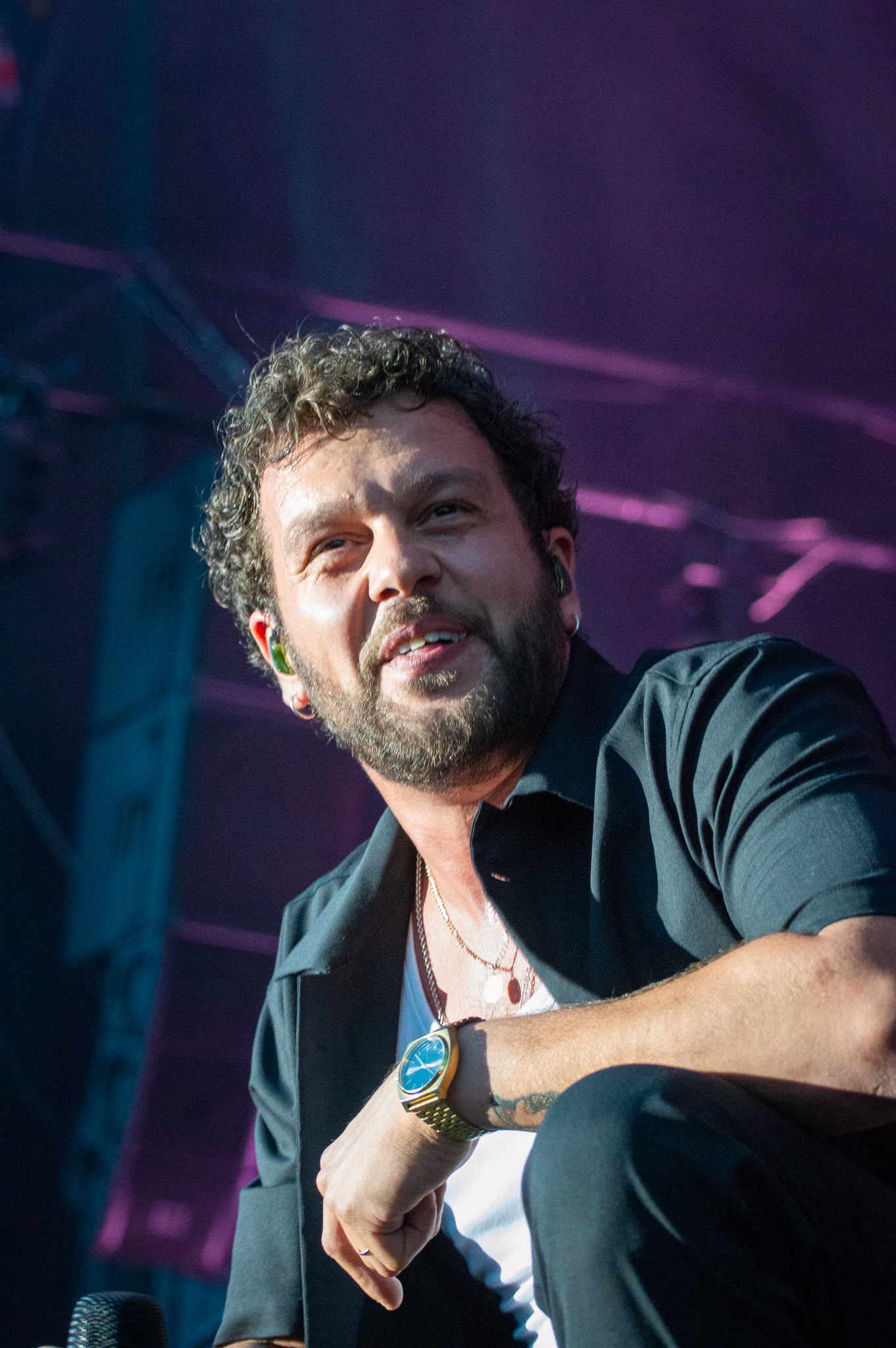
Claudio Capéo ( 10 )

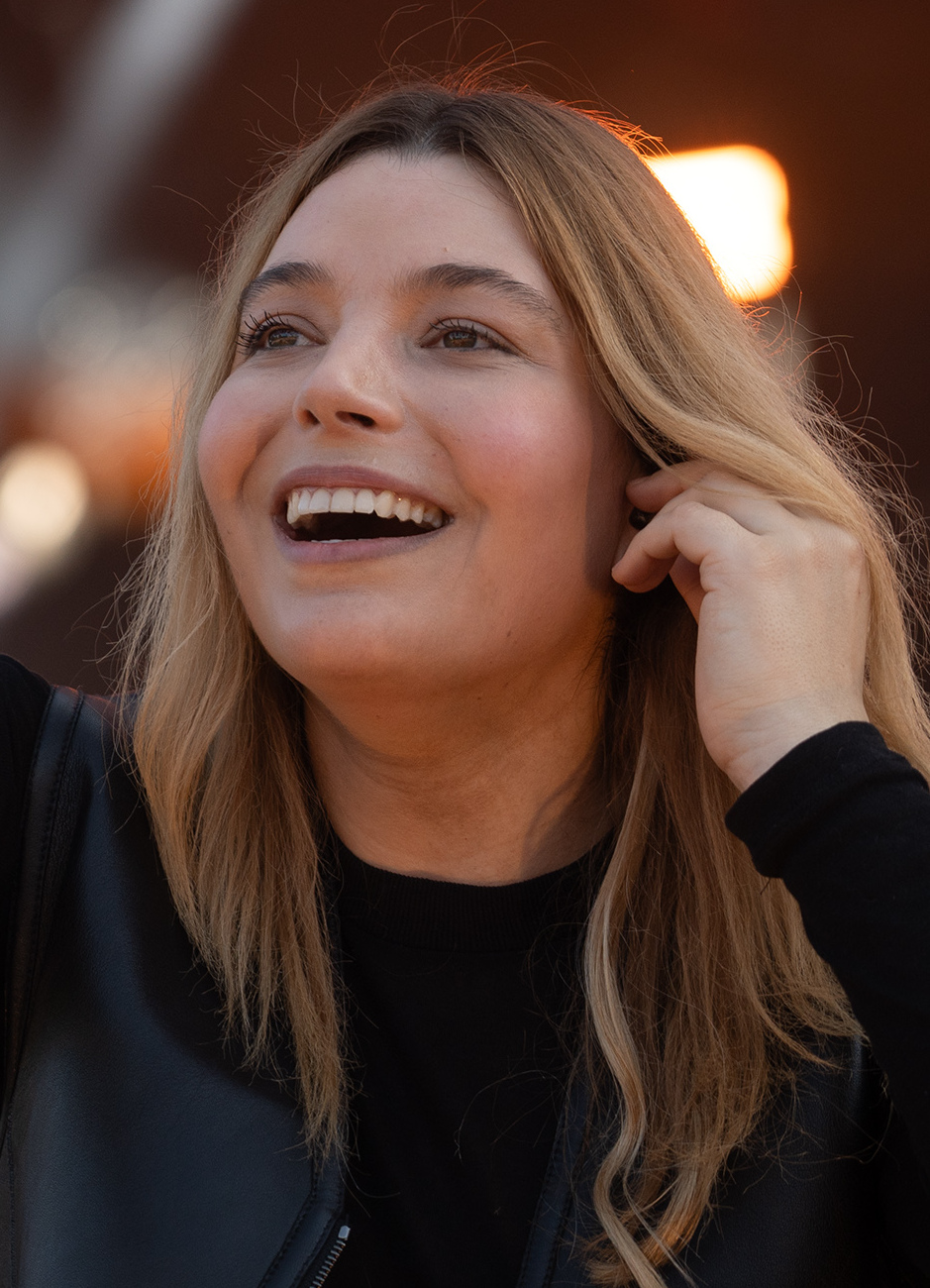
Santa ( 11 - present )

=== Line-up of Coaches ===
Coaches' line-up by chairs order
Season	Year	Coaches			
Season	Year	1	2	3	4
1	2014	Louis	Jenifer	Garou	No fourth coach
2	2015	Louis	Jenifer	Patrick	No fourth coach
3	2016	Matt	Jenifer	Patrick	No fourth coach
4	2017	Matt	Jenifer	Patrick	No fourth coach
5	2018	Patrick	Amel	Jenifer	Soprano
6	2019	Patrick	Amel	Jenifer	Soprano
7	2020	Soprano	Jenifer	Kendji	Patrick
8	2022	Julien	Louane	Kendji	Patrick
9	2023	Slimane	Kendji	Nolwenn	Patrick
10	2024	Slimane	Lara	Claudio	Patrick
11	2025	Soprano	Matt	Santa	Patrick
12	2026	Soprano	Matt	Santa	Patrick

== Coaches and finalists ==
- Winner
- Runner-up
- Third place
- Fourth place
- Semi-finalists

Season	Louis Bertignac	Jenifer	Garou	
1	Henri Bungert; Justine Bauby; Charlie Loiselier	Carla Georges; Paul Silve; Mélina Léva	Nemo Schiffman; Naya Fellonneau; Laetitia Leconte	
2	Louis Bertignac	Jenifer	Patrick Fiori	
2	Léo Ristorto; Laura Godeau; Coline Preher	Lisandro Cuxi; Lisandru Vivoni; Justine d'Aprigny	Jane Constance; Swany Patrac; Phoebe Koyabe	
3	Matt Pokora	Jenifer	Patrick Fiori	
3	Manuela Diaz; Tamilia Chance	Lou Jean; Achille Billaut	Evän Devillard; Agathe Bonin	
4	Betyssam; Antoine Letouzé	Leelou Garms; Amandine Prost	Angélina Nava; Cassidy Cruiks	
5	Patrick Fiori	Amel Bent	Jenifer	Soprano
5	Carla Lazzari; Ismaël El Marjou	Ermonia Ashkhbabyan; Madison	Emma Cerchi; Mélia Rey	Lili Laville; Inès Chouki
6	Manon Maley; Antonia Moreno	Soan Arhimann; Ali Kettani	Natihei Ly Sing Sao; Lilou Doutre	Philippe Lebouthillier; Talima
7	Soprano	Jenifer	Kendji Girac	Patrick Fiori
7	Enzo Hilaire; Rania Boussetta	Lissandro Formica; Sara Boussetta	Abdellah Boujelal	Rébecca Sayaque
7	Enzo Hilaire; Rania Boussetta	Lissandro Formica; Sara Boussetta	Naomi Aye	Ema Pampini
8	Julien Doré	Louane	Kendji Girac	Patrick Fiori
8	Loghane Schutze; Arthur	Sanaa; Sacha Lambert	Sara Pedrozo; Romane	Raynaud Sadon; Aivan Mendoza
9	Slimane	Kendji Girac	Nolwenn Leroy	Patrick Fiori
9	Durel Loumouamou	Ilyana	Lou-Agathe	Lucie
10	Slimane	Lara Fabian	Claudio Capéo	Patrick Fiori
10	Coline	Tim Houdaille	Louis Collet-Goeury	April
11	Soprano	Matt Pokora	Santa	Patrick Fiori
11	Ella; Miriam Obama	Kimon; Roxane	Wylie Pym; Diego	Charlotte Deseigne; Albert Armenakyan
12	Léna; Élisa	Nelson Charles; Livia Gentner	Alec Burette; Sophie Meliksetyan	Jude; Joy

== Series overview ==
Warning: the following table presents a significant amount of different colors.

Teams color key
Artist from Team Jenifer	Artist from Team Amel	Artist from Team Slimane
Artist from Team Garou	Artist from Team Soprano	Artist from Team Nolwenn
Artist from Team Louis	Artist from Team Kendji	Artist from Team Lara
Artist from Team Patrick	Artist from Team Louane	Artist from Team Claudio
Artist from Team Matt	Artist from Team Julien	Artist from Team Santa

French The Voice Kids series overview
Season	Aired	Winner	Runner up	Third place	Fourth place	Winning coach	Hosts
1	2014	Carla Georges	Nemo Schiffman	Henri Bungert	No fourth place	Jenifer	Karine Ferri; Nikos Aliagas
2	2015	Jane Constance	Lisandro Cuxi	Léo Ristorto	No fourth place	Patrick Fiori	Karine Ferri; Nikos Aliagas
3	2016	Manuela Diaz	Lou Jean	Evän Devillard	No fourth place	Matt Pokora	Karine Ferri; Nikos Aliagas
4	2017	Angélina Nava	Leelou Garms	Betyssam	No fourth place	Patrick Fiori	Karine Ferri; Nikos Aliagas
5	2018	Emma Cerchi	Ermonia Ashkhbabyan	Lili Laville	Carla Lazzari	Jenifer	Karine Ferri; Nikos Aliagas
6	2019	Soan Arhimann	Natihei Ly Sing Sao	Manon Maley	Philippe Lebouthillier	Amel Bent	Karine Ferri; Nikos Aliagas
7	2020	Rébecca Sayaque	Abdellah Boujelal	Naomi Ayé	Ema Pampini	Patrick Fiori	Karine Ferri; Nikos Aliagas
8	2022	Raynaud Sadon	Sara Pedrozo	Sanaa	Loghane Schutze	Patrick Fiori	Karine Ferri; Nikos Aliagas
9	2023	Durel Loumouamou	Lucie	Ilyana	Lou-Agathe	Slimane	Karine Ferri; Nikos Aliagas
10	2024	Tim Houdaille	Coline	April	Louis Collet-Goeury	Lara Fabian	Karine Ferri; Nikos Aliagas
11	2025	Charlotte Deseigne	Kimon	Ella	Wylie Pym	Patrick Fiori	Karine Ferri; Nikos Aliagas
12	2026	Nelson Charles	Alec Burette	Jude	Léna	Matt Pokora	Karine Ferri; Nikos Aliagas
