= Carla Georges =

Carla
- Born: 21 April 2003 (age 22)
- Genres: electropop, variété française, dance pop, teen pop
- Occupation: singer
- Labels: Play On (Warner Music France); Mercury Music Group / MHM (Universal Music France)

Carla Georges, known simply as Carla, is a French singer. She is the winner of the first season of the French version of The Voice Kids and a former member of the band Kids United. In October 2017 she released her first solo album.

== Early life ==
Carla Georges was born on 21 April 2003. She is from the town of Graveson in the department Bouches-du-Rhône.

== The Voice Kids ==
At the age of 10, she became a contestant in the first season of the French version of the televised singing competition The Voice Kids. "A friend of my mother knew Bruno Berberes, the casting director, and sent him a video," she recalls.

During the blind auditions, she performed Zaz's "Éblouie par la nuit" and had all three judges turning their chairs. She chose Jenifer as her coach. In the battles, Carla bettered Gloria and Mina singing Édith Piaf's "L'homme à la moto". In the final, which took place on September 20, first she sang Céline Dion's "Vole" for a spot in the final three and then, in the "championship battle", in which the contestants repeated their audition songs, once again performed "Éblouie par la nuit" and won.

The day after her victory, Carla stated that she was "too young" and wanted to "wait a few years" before releasing an album. But a month later it was reported that she started to work on her debut single. The media turned for comments to Jenifer, who had publicly supported the Voice Kids' decision to award the winner a scholarship instead of a recording contract, and Jenifer confirmed that she was against making stars out of children and against Carla releasing a record. "When I'm against it, I tell them", she said. In the end, the single never came to be because Carla didn't find a song that suited her: "I love songs in English, but it's difficult to find a song in French with lyrics that I like and can relate to. I'm only 12. I think I should wait two or three more years. But if I find a song of my dreams, it will be difficult to refuse!" she explained in a September 2015 interview with Purepeople.

== Music career ==
In 2015, Carla continued her music career as a member of Kids United, a child musical group formed as part of a campaign of UNICEF France with the intention of covering "the most beautiful songs celebrating peace and hope". She was 12 when the group's first single, "On écrit sur les murs", became a hit. The debut album followed in November, debuting at number 9. Both would linger in the French charts for months, eventually, in February 2016, hitting, respectively, number three and number one.

On 3 March 2016 Carla announced on Twitter that she left the group. At first, it was said that she left to devote herself to her personal projects (her solo project mentioned in her original tweet), but later she confessed that she left because it was too tiring for her to be in the band while having to go to school.

At the end of 2016, she covered the song "Love Will Find a Way" from Lion King 2 on the compilation We Love Disney 3, released by Universal Music France.

In 2017, she performed the French-language version of the song "What's My Name" from Disney Channel's Descendants 2. This version was released on the French version of the soundtrack album for the movie.

She released her first solo single, "Le Meilleur des 2" (French version of Hanna Montana's "The Best of Both Worlds") in early October 2017 and her first solo album, titled simply Carla, on October 27. It was reported that Carla's fans were very disappointed with her choice to cover Disney's theme songs for her comeback. The album debuted at number 124 in France.

== Discography ==
=== Albums ===
| Album | Charts |
| Album | FRA |
|---|---|
| Carla: Released : 27 October 2017; Label : Mercury Music Group / MHM (Universal Music France) | 124 |

=== Singles ===
| Title | Year | Charts | Album |
| Title | Year | FRA | Album |
|---|---|---|---|
| "Le Meilleur des 2"^{*} | 2017 | — | Carla |
| "Des ailes"^{**} | 2017 | — | Carla |
| "Double Mise"^{***} | 2018 | — | Carla |

^{*}French-language adaptation of the song "The Best of Both Worlds"
^{**} French-language adaptation of the song "Alas"
^{***} French-language adaptation of the song "Bet on It"
