= Mentissa =

Scientific classification
- Domain: Eukaryota
- Kingdom: Animalia
- Phylum: Mollusca
- Class: Gastropoda
- Order: Stylommatophora
- Family: Clausiliidae
- Genus: Mentissa; H.Adams & A.Adams, 1855

Genus of land snails

Mentissa is a genus of gastropods belonging to the family Clausiliidae.

The species of this genus are found in Mediterranean and near Black Sea.

Species:

- Mentissa canalifera (Rossmässler, 1836)
- Mentissa gracilicosta (Rossmässler, 1836)
- Mentissa velutina Baidashnikov, 1990
