= Nej (village) =

- village
- Nickname:, ಬಂಗಾರ ಗುಡ್ಡ
- Location in Karnataka, India Nej (India)
- Coordinates: 16.42°N 74.58°E
- Country: India
- State: Karnataka
- District: Belgaum
- Talukas: Chikodi

Population (2001)
  - Total: 6,514

Languages
  - Official: Kannada
- Time zone: UTC+5:30 (IST)

Nej is a village in the southern state of Karnataka, India. It is located in the Chikodi taluk of Belgaum district in Karnataka. Nej covers an area of about 30 km^{2} (12 sq mi).

== Demographics ==
Nej is a village in the Chikkodi taluka of Belagavi district, Karnataka, India. According to the 2011 census, its population is about 8,500.

The local economy is primarily agrarian, though industrial development in the surrounding area has provided employment opportunities for residents. Educational facilities include the MLN Government High School. The village features several religious sites, including the Kadasiddeshwar, Bireshwar, Kalikadevi, and Chandravvatayi temples, as well as two Jain basadis. An institutional festival (yatra mahotsav) dedicated to Lakshmi Devi is held once every five years between late January and early February.

== Nearby villages ==
Vadagol, Nagaral, Nanadi, Galataga, Shamanewadi, Bedakihal.Sadalga,Shiragaonvadi,Shiragaon.

== Hobali of Nej ==
Sadalaga

== See also ==
- Belgaum
- Districts of Karnataka
