= RnBoi =

French musical artist

Background information
- Born: Samy Schmitt Fahli; 15 June 2006 (age 20); Fontainebleau, France
- Genre: Contemporary R&B
- Occupations: singer; rapper; music producer
- Labels: DOUBLE JEU RECORDS; Nakamura Industrie
- Website: www.rnboi.com

RnBoi, whose real name is Samy Schmitt Fahli (born 15 June 2006), is a French R&B singer, rapper, producer, musician, and beatmaker.

== Early life ==
Samy Schmitt Fahli was born on June 15, 2006 in Fontainebleau, to a Moroccan mother and an Italian father. He grew up in Nemours. He has two older sisters. While still in high school, he dropped out to dedicate himself to music.

== Career ==
Before launching himself as a singer, RnBoi began his musical career as a beatmaker. He then started performing rap tracks before shifting toward R&B.

In 2025, he became the very first artist to be signed to singer Aya Nakamura's record label.

On June 27, 2025, he released his first EP titled My Eyes Only, driven by the hit "BTRD".

In October 2025, he followed up with a second hit, "Mon bébé", which went viral on social media before its release. The track was also composed with Max on guitar and Seny on piano. It charted in the top 5 of several countries and reached number one on the Billboard chart in Luxembourg. In 2025, he was also the only French artist to enter the Spotify Global Top 200 as a solo act with this track.

In March 2026, he became a brand ambassador for Rabanne's 1 Million fragrance.

== Origin of the stage name ==
The stage name RnBoi is a reference to Eren from Attack on Titan, due to a physical resemblance to the character in his youth.

== Discography ==
Mixtapes

- My Eyes Only – Flashback (2026)
