= Paro (song) =

2021 single by Nej'

Single by Nej'

from the album SOS : Chapitre II
- Released: May 21, 2021
- Recorded: 2021
- Length: 3:25
- Label: Miel Noir
- Songwriters: Nasraddine Mona; Najoua "Nej" Laamri
- Producer: Nasraddine

Music video
- Paro on YouTube

"Paro" is a song by French singer Nej', released on May 21, 2021 from her album SOS : Chapitre II.

The song later went viral on several social media platforms such as TikTok and YouTube starting in 2022.

== Charts ==
Chart (2022)	Peak position
France (SNEP)	130
Germany (GfK)	93
India International (IMI)	13
Netherlands (Single Tip)	14
Switzerland (Schweizer Hitparade)	82

== Certifications ==
Certifications for "Paro"
Region	Certification	Certified units/sales
France (SNEP)	Platinum	200,000^{‡}
^{‡} Sales+streaming figures based on certification alone.

== Zeynep Bastık version ==
"Ara"

Single by Zeynep Bastık
- Released: July 28, 2022
- Recorded: 2022
- Length: 3:25
- Label: Hypers; Universal
- Songwriters: Emrah Karakuyu; Nasraddine Mona; Laamri "Nej" Najoua
- Producer: Nasraddine

On July 28, 2022, Turkish singer Zeynep Bastık released a Turkish version of the song.

== Charts ==
Chart (2022)	Peak position
Turkey (Billboard)	1
