= Helena (singer) =

Belgian singer-songwriter (born 2002)

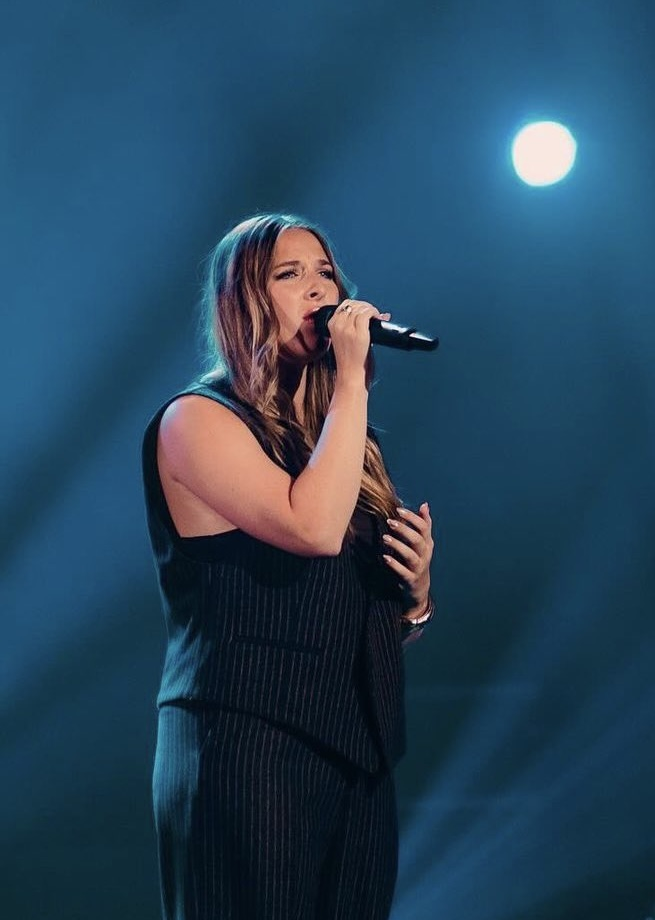
- Helena in October 2024

Background information
- Born: Héléna Bailly; 19 February 2002 (age 24); Uccle, Brussels, Belgium
- Genre: Chanson
- Occupations: Singer; songwriter
- Instruments: Vocals; piano
- Years active: 2023–present
- Label: RCA

Héléna Bailly (born 19 February 2002), known mononymously as Helena, is a Belgian singer and songwriter. She became known to the general public thanks to her participation in the eleventh season of the French television show Star Academy. On 1 March 2024, Helena released her first single, "Aimée pour de vrai". That same year, she released an EP and a fourth single, "Mauvais garçon". On 14 March 2025, she released her debut studio album, Hélé, which reached number one in France the week of its release.

== Early life and education ==
Héléna Bailly is originally from Braine-l'Alleud. Her mother is a retired Dutch teacher and her father is a physiotherapist. Helena was a speech therapy student at the Université libre de Bruxelles (ULB) when she signed up for the 2023 edition of the TV show Star Academy.

== Musical career ==
=== Star Academy (2023–2024) ===
Helena participated in the 2023 edition of the show Star Academy. She reached the semi-finals, but was eliminated on 27 January 2024, against the eventual winner, Pierre Garnier.

=== Hélé (2024–present) ===
On 1 March 2024, Helena released her first single, "Aimée pour de vrai". She received her first gold record in Belgium for this track on 27 September 2024. She officially launched her solo career on 21 June with an EP titled Pas de seum pour le summer, which included the tracks "Nouveau cœur" and "Summer Body". The music video for the song "Summer Body", featuring Camille Cerf, Miss France 2015, was released on 12 August 2024. On 21 October 2024, she announced her first tour. Following public enthusiasm, she announced a "Zénith" tour, including several dates at Forest National.

On 20 November 2024, ahead of the release of her first album, Helena released her fourth single, "Mauvais garçon", in which she denounces toxic romantic relationships. She claims to have had to fight to release this track, which she describes as a "UFO" in her discography. The song quickly achieved streaming success, being certified gold in less than three months. The music video, based on the concept of "Red Flag Office", was released on 22 January 2025. Between late February 2025 and March 2025, it was the most-played French-language track on radio in France for three consecutive weeks.

On 19 February 2025, Helena released her fifth single, "Gentil garçon", which denounces societal stereotypes towards men and their role within a couple. On 14 March 2025, she released her first studio album, Hélé, which tells the story of different episodes of her life in thirteen tracks. For this album, she co-wrote all her lyrics with Vincha and decided to include both ballads and more pop and electro songs with a view to having fun on her upcoming tour. The album was also produced and composed with Jonathan Cagne and Romain Botti. It is described by the press as a successful mix of pop and intimate pieces. The album had a strong start, rising to seventh place worldwide for album releases on Spotify during the first weekend and to first place for album sales in France the week of its release with 18,991 equivalent sales. It also entered No. 1 in French-speaking Belgium and, rather rarely for a French-speaking album, to 8th place in Flanders.

== Charity work ==
On 6 October 2024, Helena participated in the 12th edition of CAP 48, a Belgian organization that raises funds for people with disabilities in Belgium.

On 8 January 2025, the Génération Pièces Jaunes collective, of which Helena is a member, released the song "Les p'tits soleils", to help hospitalized children and adolescents. On 22 March 2025, she participated in the Sidaction evening on France 2, where she shared a duet with Amir.

== Discography ==
=== Studio albums ===
List of studio albums, with selected chart positions
Title	Details	Peak chart positions			
Title	Details	BEL (WA)	BEL (FL)	FRA	SWI
Hélé	Released: 14 March 2025; Label: RCA; Format: CD, LP, digital download, streaming	1	8	1	6

=== Singles ===
List of singles, with selected chart positions, showing year released, certifications and album name
Title	Year	Peak chart positions		Certifications	Album
Title	Year	BEL (WA)	FRA	Certifications	Album
"Aimée pour de vrai"	2024	5	37	BEA: Gold; SNEP: Gold	Non-album single
"Summer Body"	2024	25	80	BEA: Gold; SNEP: Gold	Hélé
"Nouveau cœur"	2024	37	161		Non-album single
"Mauvais garçon"	2024	3	17	SNEP: Platinum	Hélé
"Gentil garçon"	2025	50	116		Hélé
"Mélatonine"	2025	8	157		Hélé 2
"Tout a changé (Rien n'a changé)"	2025	5	—		Hélé 2
"Capuche"	2026	6	186		Hélé 2
"—" denotes a recording that did not chart or was not released in that country.

== Awards and nominations ==
Year	Award	Category	Nominee/work	Result	Reference
2024	NRJ Music Awards	Herself	Belgian Breakthrough of the Year	Won	
2024	NRJ Music Awards	Herself	Francophone Breakthrough of the Year	Nominated	
2024	Forbes (Belgium)	Herself	30 Under 30	Won	
2024	Ciné-Télé-Revue Awards	Herself	Belgian of the Year	Won	
2024	Ciné-Télé-Revue Awards	Herself	Belgian TV personality	Won	
2024	Purecharts Awards	Herself	Breakthrough of the Year	Won	
2024	Purecharts Awards	Star Academy	Concert of the Year	Nominated	
2024	Purecharts Awards	Summer Body	Clip of the Year	Won	
