= Nej' =

French singer-songwriter (born 1994)

- Nej' posing for the album Nej' SOS IV

Background information
- Born: Najoua Laamri; June 30, 1994 (age 31); Toulouse, France
- Genres: Pop, Hip-hop, R&B
- Occupation: Singer-songwriter
- Years active: 2016–present
- Label: Miel noir

Najoua Laamri (born 30 June 1994), known professionally as Nej', is a French singer-songwriter. She rose to prominence in 2021 with her viral single Paro.

== Early life ==
Born in Toulouse, France, Nej' is of Moroccan heritage.

== Career ==
Nej' began her musical career in 2016, releasing her early works independently. She gradually built an online following, gaining wider public attention with the success of Paro in 2021. She continued to release a series of successful EPs and full-length albums, with her 2023 album Athéna solidifying her presence in the French urban music landscape and expanding her reach to broader audiences both in France and internationally.

In 2023, Nej' launched the Athéna Tour, her first nationwide headlining concert series across major French cities.

== Musical style and influences ==
Nej's music is known for emotional storytelling, melodic hooks, and North African influences. She writes much of her own material, drawing on themes such as heartbreak, healing, and self-empowerment. Nej often blends French with Arabic phrases in her lyrics.

Her musical inspirations include R&B icons like Beyoncé and Alicia Keys, as well as French-speaking artists such as Zaho and Amel Bent. Her North African roots frequently influence her vocal stylings and lyrical themes.

== Discography ==
=== Studio albums ===
- Enchantée (2019)
- Athéna (2023)

=== EPs ===
- SOS: Chapitre I (2021)
- SOS: Chapitre II (2022)
- SOS: Chapitre III (2022)
- SOS: Chapitre IV (2025)

=== Selected singles ===
- "Ena Ena" (2017)
- "Paro" (2021)
- "Irréel - Intro" (2022)
- "Pourquoi pas" (2022)
- "Dernière fois" (2023)
- "Warda" (2023)
- "Mal lunée" (2025)
