= Hoshi (French singer) =

French singer-songwriter

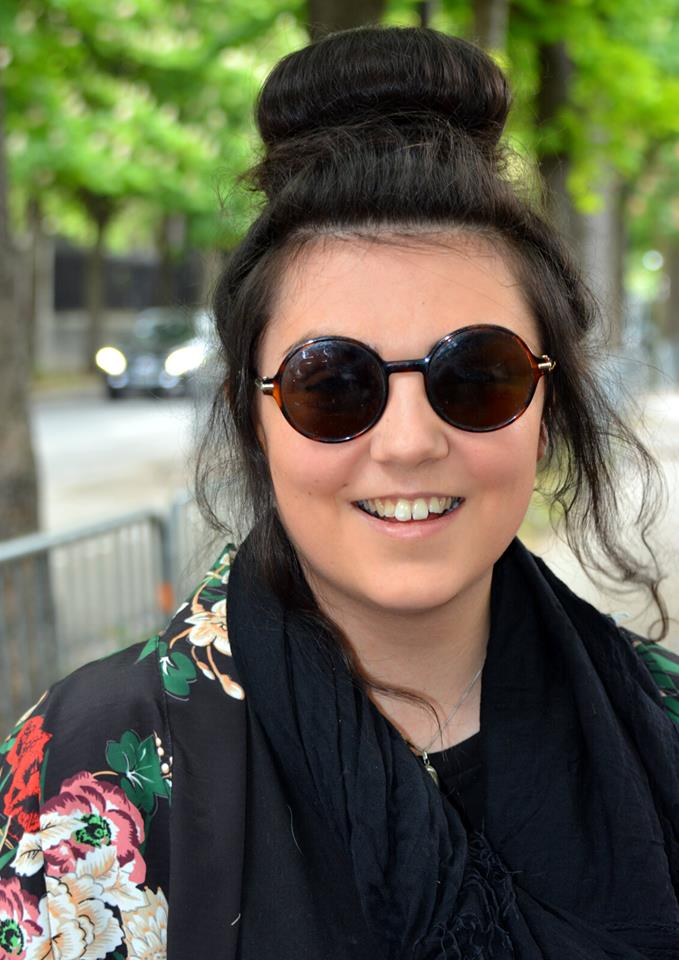
- Hoshi in 2018

Background information
- Born: Mathilde Gerner; 14 September 1996 (age 29); Versailles, Yvelines, France
- Genres: Chanson
- Occupation: Singer-songwriter
- Instruments: Vocals; guitar; piano
- Labels: Jo & Co

Mathilde Gerner (French pronunciation: [matild ʒɛʁnɛʁ]; born 14 September 1996), better known by her stage mononym Hoshi, is a French singer-songwriter.

== Biography ==
=== Early life ===
Mathilde Gerner was born on 14 September 1996 in Versailles and grew up in the commune Montigny-le-Bretonneux of the communauté d'agglomération Saint-Quentin-en-Yvelines. She started playing the piano at the age of 6 and the guitar at the age of 15, which is when she wrote her first songs.

=== Musical career ===
Gerner began her musical career with the amateur music group TransyStory, which was formed in September 2011. She provided vocals, keyboard, and guitar to this four-person group. The band occasionally put up municipal performances in Montigny-le-Bretonneux. The group played "Lou", their first recorded piece of music. Around the same time, in December 2011, Gerner alone competed in and won the "Jeunes Talents, c’est maintenant!" competition, organized by the city. During this competition, she was noticed by Marc Isacco, who was in charge of a musical section in Montigny. Through Isacco, she was able to meet established artists and perform in larger venues. TransyStory separated at the end of 2012 and Gerner continued her solo career.

Being passionate about Japanese culture, she chose Hoshi Hideko as her stage name, later shortened to simply Hoshi (星), which means "star" in Japanese. She became known by publishing covers on the Internet and she received the support of the label Styiens. In 2013, at the age of 16, she was invited by the casting director of the French The Voice to compete. She successfully passed auditions but decided not to continue when the show's production wanted to control her song choice.

Gerner left high school and devoted herself to music by performing in the streets. In 2014, she participated in the show Rising Star on the channel M6, but her cover of "Mistral gagnant" did not qualify her. She returned to singing in the streets, where she was able to try out compositions. She also performed solo for small concerts. She was contacted almost two years later by a manager, through whom she was signed by the label Jo & Co.

==== Gaining recognition ====
On 3 March 2017, she released her first single, "Comment je vais faire". The song and its music video achieved some success.

On 19 May 2017, she released her first EP, "Comment je vais faire", through the label Jo & Co. It contained the eponymous track along with an acoustic version, as well as three original tracks, "Manège à trois", "En gros tout est gris", and "Parking sonne".

On 23 March 2018, she released her first album, "Il suffit d'y croire". Her breakthrough success came with the title "Ta marinière".

On 5 October 2018, she sang a duet in Ycare's song "À qui la faute".

In 2020, she was nominated in the Victoires de la musique in the category "Stage Révélation of the Year".

=== Personal life ===
Gerner appeared with Gia Martinelli in November 2018 on the red carpet at the NRJ Music Awards when she was nominated for the category of Francophone Breakthrough of the Year (Révélation francophone de l'année). In December the same year, she said she was the victim of a "forced coming out" due to the publication of an article in Paris Match that wrote about her homosexuality based on comments she denies ever making.

Suffering from hearing loss since childhood, she learned during her first tour that she suffers from Ménière's disease. She mentioned it in an interview in February 2020 and spoke about it publicly in April 2021 on the set of the program C à vous.

== Influences ==
Gerner's varied influences include Jacques Brel, Serge Gainsbourg, Catherine Ringer, Les Rita Mitsouko, Noir Désir, Léo Férré, The Cranberries, Patti Smith, Janis Joplin, Izïa Higelin, and Nirvana.

== Discography ==
=== Albums ===
Year	Album
2018	Il suffit d'y croire
2020	Sommeil levant
2021	Étoile flippante
2023	Cœur Parapluie
2024	Cœur Papillon

=== Singles ===
Year	Single	Peak position	Album
2017	"Comment je vais faire" (single, then EP)	-	Il suffit d'y croire
2018	"Ta marinière"	48	Il suffit d'y croire
2019	"Je vous trouve un charme fou" (feat. Gaëtan Roussel)		Il suffit d'y croire
2019	"Amour censure"	148	Sommeil levant
2020	"SQY"		Sommeil levant
2020	"Enfants du danger"		Sommeil levant
2020	"Marche ou rêve"		Sommeil levant
2021	"Et même après je t'aimerai"	136	Étoile flippante
2021	"Allez là"		Étoile flippante
2021	"Il était une toi"		Étoile flippante
2021	"J'te pardonne"		Étoile flippante
2023	"Mauvais rêve"		Cœur Parapluie
2023	"Je partirai"		Cœur Parapluie
2024	"Tu vas me quitter encore longtemps ?"		Cœur Papillon
