= Santa (singer) =

French singer-songwriter (born 1991)

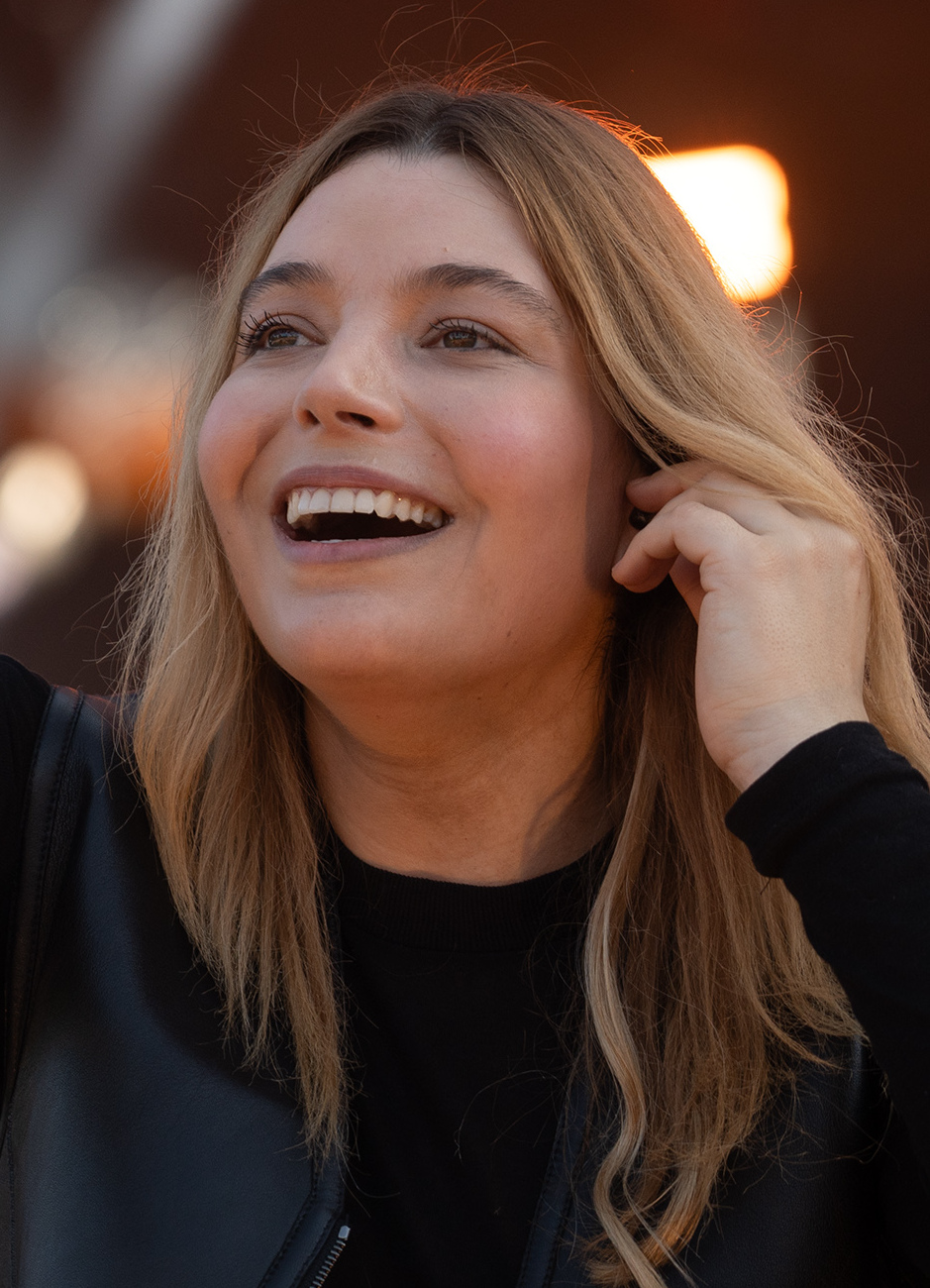
- Santa in 2024

Background information
- Born: Samanta Cotta; 24 February 1991 (age 35); Nice, France
- Genre: Pop
- Occupations: Singer; Songwriter
- Years active: 2009–present
- Website: www.santa999.fr

Samanta Cotta (born 24 February 1991), known professionally as Santa, is a French singer-songwriter and musician. Initially known since 2009 for being the singer of the English-speaking rock group Hyphen Hyphen, she found solo success singing in French since 2022 with her first album Recommence-moi, from which the hit singles Popcorn Salé and Recommence-moi were taken. Her main genres are chanson française and ballad.

== Biography ==
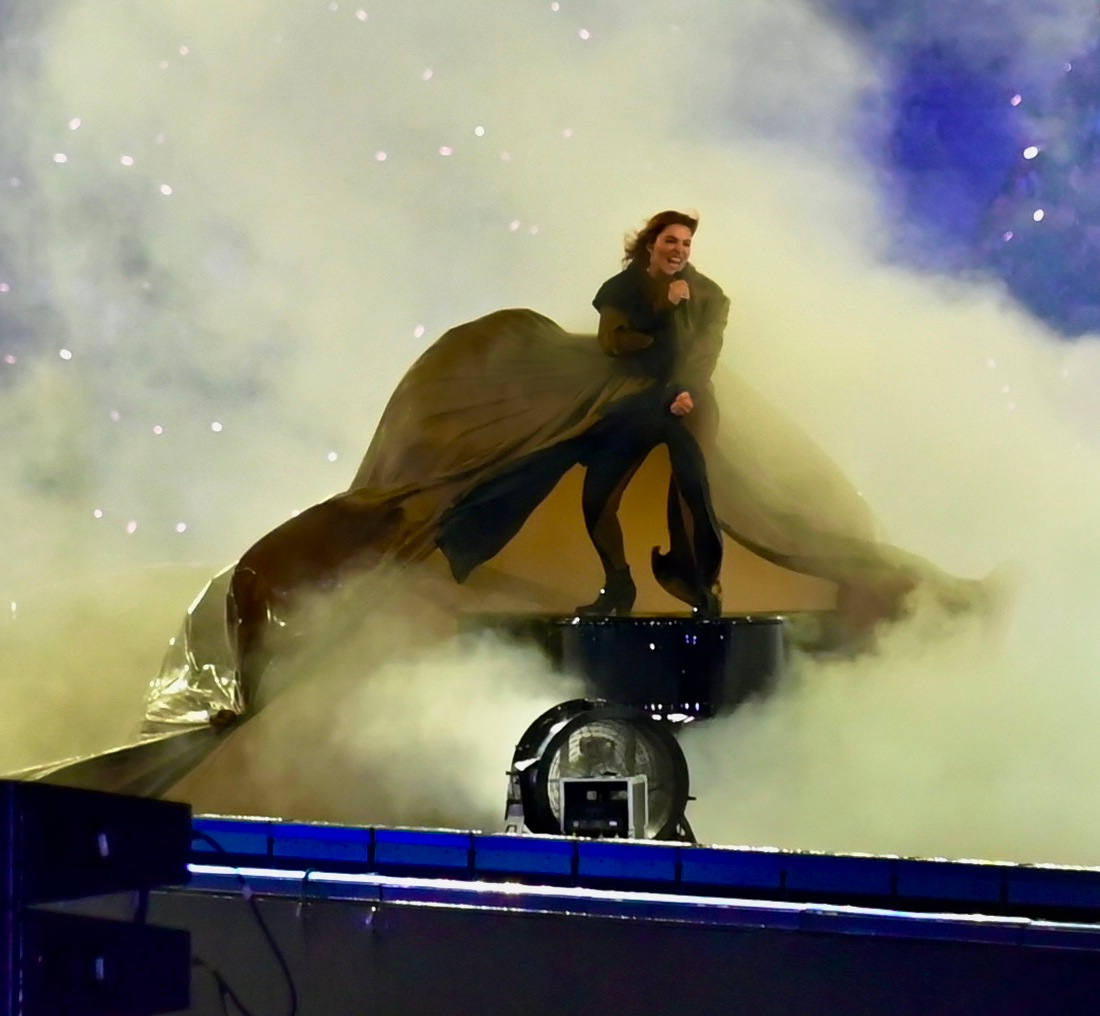
At the 2024 Summer Paralympics closing ceremony at the Stade de France in September 2024

Samanta Cotta, known professionally as Santa, was born on 24 February 1991. She grew up in Nice in a family of artists, with an American mother, the singer of the group Daisy Duck in the early 1980s, and an architect father who studied fine arts. In 2009, Santa founded the group Hyphen Hyphen with her childhood friends Adam (Romain Adamo), Line (Laura Christin) and Zac (Zaccharie Schütte) and with whom, in 2016, she won the Victoire de la musique award for breakthrough live act.

In 2022, concurrently with her work with the group, she embarked on a solo career and released a 6-track EP, 999. The first single, Popcorn salé, was a major success and was certified diamond, as well as its follow up, Recommence-moi. Her first album, also titled Recommence-moi, was met with critical and commercial success, and earned her the Victoire de la musique award for album of the year in February 2025.

Known for her bold live performances, she first gained momentum in 2023 when she gave a performance in Brussels with her grand piano suspended 40 metres above the ground, as part of the opening of the inaugural Urban Garden de Plaisirs d'Été organised by the city of Brussels. On 8 September 2024, she opened the 2024 Summer Paralympics closing ceremony at the Stade de France in front of 60,000 spectators by performing Vivre pour le meilleur by Johnny Hallyday. Her first solo tour in 2025 was met with critical acclaim, the newspaper Le Parisien describing the show as "vocally and visually exceptional".

== Discography ==
=== Solo ===
==== Studio album ====
Recommence-moi (Warner Music, Parlophone, 2024)

- "Popcorn salé"
- "Recommence-moi"
- "La différence"
- "Les larmes ne coulent pas" (with Christophe Willem)
- "Eva"
- "Paradis"
- "Chanter le monde"
- "Où va le temps qui s'en va"
- "Qui a le droit"
- "Silverlake"
- "Générique de fin"

==== EP ====
999 (Warner Music, Parlophone, 2022)

- "Popcorn salé"
- "Paris en août"
- "Réveil"
- "Je brûle"
- "Où va le temps qui s'en va"
- "Qui a le droit"

==== Singles ====
- 2023 : "Popcorn salé" (certified Diamond)
- 2024 : "Recommence-moi" (certified Diamond)
- 2025 : "La Différence" (certified Gold)
- 2025 : "Dis-moi oui"
