= Éblouie par la nuit =

2011 single by Zaz

Single by Zaz

from the album Zaz
- Released: November 2011
- Genre: Blues; soft rock
- Length: 2:53
- Label: Play On (Sony Music)
- Songwriter: Raphaël
- Producer: Raphaël

Zaz singles chronology
"La Fée" (2010)	"Éblouie par la nuit" (2011)	"On ira" (2013)

Music video
- "Éblouie par la nuit" on YouTube

"Éblouie par la nuit" is a song by French singer Zaz, written by Raphaël. She included it on her first studio album, Zaz (2010), and in November 2011 released it as the fourth and final single from the album. The music video was released on 17 November 2011. The song was also played in the end credits of Dead Man Down.

== Track listing ==
Promo digital single – Play On (Sony)

1. "Éblouie par la nuit" (2:53)

== Cover versions ==
The future Kids United member Erza Muqoli performed the song in the 20 January 2015 semi-final of the ninth season of La France a un incroyable talent, provoking a standing ovation from the audience.

Kids United later covered it on their first album, Un monde meilleur (2016).

== Charts ==
Chart (2011–2012)	Peak position
France (SNEP)	13
Belgium (Ultratop 50 Flanders)	17
Belgium (Ultratop 50 Wallonia)	34
Chart (2014)	Peak position
Belgium (Ultratop Back Catalogue Singles Wallonia)	1
Chart (2015)	Peak position
Belgium (Ultratop Back Catalogue Singles Flanders)	2
