= Si (Zaz song) =

2013 song by Zaz

Single by Zaz

from the album Recto Verso
- Language: French
- English title: If
- Released: October 14, 2013
- Genre: Chanson
- Length: 2:36
- Label: Play On
- Songwriter: Jean-Jacques Goldman
- Producer: Jean-Jacques Goldman

"Si" is a song by French singer-songwriter Zaz, released as a single from the 2013 album Recto Verso.

== Chart positions ==
Chart (2013–2014)	Peak position
Belgium (Ultratip Bubbling Under Flanders)	36
Belgium (Ultratip Bubbling Under Wallonia)	3
France (SNEP)	34
