= Kids United =

French singing group (2015–2021)

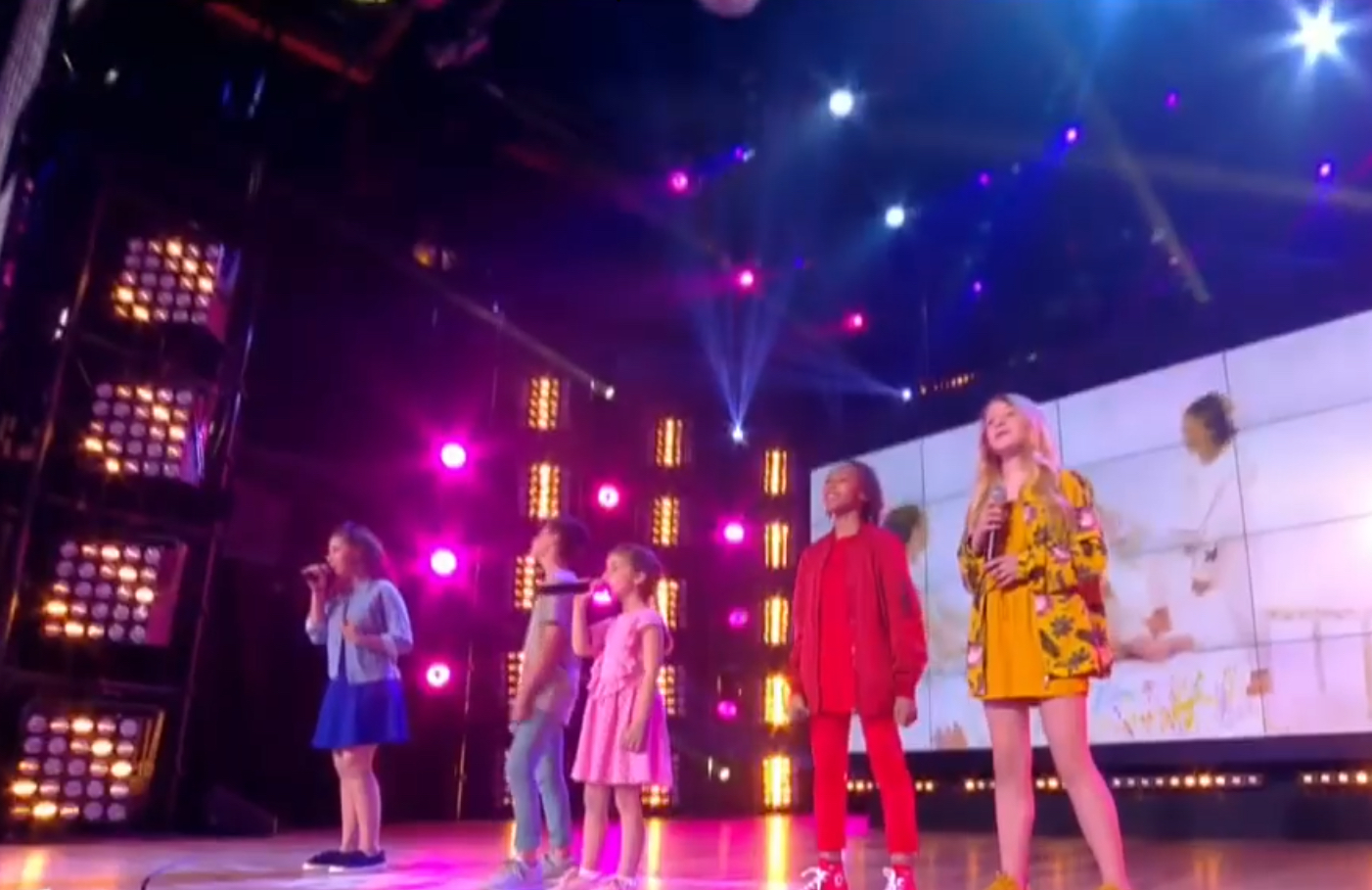
- The Kids United on stage for the Don't Touch My Post show at Canal Factory in 2018.

Background information
- Origin: France
- Genre: Pop
- Years active: 2015–2017 (first generation); 2018–2021 (new generation)
- Past members: Carla Georges; Erza Muqoli; Esteban Durand; Gabriel Gros; Gloria Palermo de Blasi; Nilusi Nissanka; Dylan Marina; Ilyana Raho-Moussa; Nathan Laface; Valentina Tronel

Kids United were a French pop band between 2015 and 2021 that consisted of six, later five, children born between 2000 and 2009. It was created to support UNICEF campaigns and is sponsored by Hélène Ségara and Corneille, two Francophone singers. The first album Un monde meilleur (A better world) was launched on Universal Children's Day in 2015, it received gold certification in France. The second album Tout le bonheur du monde was certified 2× platinum. It won a Felix Award for best pop album; making it the band's first award.

On 30 May 2018, it was announced that three of the remaining four members were to leave the group for a solo career, and the one remaining member, Gloria, would continue with other young singers under the name Kids United Nouvelle Génération (Kids United New Generation). In 2020, Kids United Nouvelle Génération joined Green Team: a group of artists who sing to raise awareness of ecological issues.

== Original members ==
=== Erza Muqoli ===
Erza was born on 21 September 2005 (age 21) in Sarreguemines, Moselle, Lorraine. Her parents are from Kosovo. She has two older sisters and a brother. She was a contestant in La France a un incroyable talent where she notably sang "Papaoutai" by Stromae in her first audition, "Éblouie par la nuit" by Raphaël Haroche in the semi-final, and "La Vie en rose" by Édith Piaf in the final. She finished in 3rd place. She took piano and singing lessons in Sarralbe and her music teacher regularly posted videos of her singing on the Internet. She was 10 when Kids United was formed. She released a single, Je Chanterai, in 2019.

=== Carla Georges ===
Carla was born on April 21, 2003 (age 23) in Avignon, Vaucluse, Provence-Alpes-Côte d'Azur. In 2014, she was a contestant in the first edition of The Voice Kids. She auditioned with the song "Éblouie par la nuit" by Raphaël Haroche. With her coach Jenifer, she won the season. On 3 March 2016 she announced on Twitter that she was leaving Kids United for solo projects. She didn't appear in the second album, but she participated in some of the group activities after she left.

=== Esteban Costoso ===
Esteban was born on 27 June 2000 (age 26) in Saint-Denis, Seine-Saint-Denis, Île-de-France. His family is from Spain. In 2011, he was a contestant in Season 6 of La France a un incroyable talent with his 14-year-old cousin Diego Losada. In 2013, he was a contestant in Season 4 of Italia's Got Talent, with his cousin Diego, and later participated in Belgium's Got Talent. In 2017, he participated in the first edition of The Voice Kids. He has a YouTube channel called "Esteban y Diego" with his cousin Diego. They both live in Paris and they both play guitar. He also has a sister named Laura. He was 15 when Kids United was formed. He announced that he will be quitting the group for a solo career. He was the oldest boy of the original group.

=== Gabriel Gros ===
Gabriel was born on 27 April 2002 (age 24) in Roubaix. He is from England and is part Antillean and Senegalese. He taught other members of the group English songs. He lives in Tourcoing. He was a contestant on the show TeenStar. After, he had to choose between The Voice Kids and Kids United, and chose to join Kids United because he liked the idea of helping children. He was 13 when Kids United was formed. He has since competed on The Voice UK, 2019, where he made it to the knockouts with coach Will.i.am and now lives in London.

=== Nilusi Nissanka ===
Nilusi was born on 12 February 2000 (age 26) in Paris. Her family is from Sri Lanka. She participated in L'École des fans in January 2014 with Tal. She won the game with two jury votes. She started a YouTube channel where she posts covers. She plays a number of instruments, such as the guitar, piano and drums. She was the oldest member of the original Kids United, and was 15 when the group was formed. In November 2017, it was announced she was leaving the group to start a solo career. She has since released numerous songs including Je veux and Au-Delà.

== Kids United Nouvelle Génération members ==
Known as Kids United Nouvelle Génération, the new members of the formation were:

=== Gloria Palermo de Blasi ===
Gloria, Born on 27 April 2007 (age 19) Metz, Moselle, Lorraine. In 2014, she was a contestant in the first edition of The Voice Kids. She was teamed with Jennifer and lost to Carla in the semi-finals, past member of Kids United. She was the youngest member of the original Kids United group and was 8 when the group was created. Her mother is also a singer who, in 2017, auditioned in The Voice (French TV series) though she did not make it past the auditions. Gloria played Emilie in the musical Émilie Jolie and in December 2018 released her new single "Petit Papa Noël". On 22 June 2021, she has announced in a story of her Instagram account that the Best of Tour was officially cancelled, supposedly putting an end to the group altogether.

=== Dylan Marina ===
Dylan was born on 22 July 2004 (age 22). He was a contestant in Season 4 of The Voice Kids where he made it to the semi-final. He participated in the Kids United and Friends Tour before joining Kids United Nouvelle Generation. He was a part of the album Sardou et nous where he sang "La Java de Broadway" and "En Chantant" with Lou, Nemo Schifman and Angie Robba. Dylan's favourite singer is Beyoncé.

=== Ilyana Raho-Moussa ===
Ilyana was born on 18 February 2005 (age 21) in Le Havre. She is of Algerian and Canadian origin. She was a contestant in Season 4 of The Voice Kids where she made it to the semi-final. She is a part of the album Sardou et nous... : she sings Je vole with Nemo Schifman.

=== Nathan Laface ===
Nathan was born on 6 June 2006 (age 20). He is Italian-Swiss and is from the Swiss city of Neuchâtel. On July 16, 2021, he released his first single "Par amour" feat. Minissia under the stage name NTH.

=== Valentina Tronel ===
Valentina was born on 6 April 2009 (age 17). She was born in Brittany, France. She auditioned for The Voice Kids at the age of 7, with the song Tra te e il mare by Laura Pausini, though none of the judges selected her for their team. She is the youngest member of Kids United Nouvelle Génération. She also participated in The Tremplin 2018. Two years later, she represented France in the Junior Eurovision Song Contest 2020 with her first single J'imagine. She went on to win the contest, giving France its first victory in the JESC.

== Discography ==
=== Studio albums ===
Title	Details	Peak chart positions			
Title	Details	FRA	BEL (FL)	BEL (WA)	SWI
Un monde meilleur	Released: 20 November 2015; Label: Play On, M6 Interactions; Format: Digital download, CD	1	—	3	6
Tout le bonheur du monde (Note: Alternatively Kids United 2 or Kids United 2ème album.)	Released: 18 August 2016; Label: Play On, M6 Interactions; Format: Digital download, CD	1	178	1	2
Forever United (Note: Alternatively Kids United 3 or Kids United 3ème album.)	Released: 18 August 2017; Label: Play On, M6 Interactions; Format: Digital download, CD	1	163	1	3
Nouvelle génération: Au bout de nos rêves	Released: 17 August 2018; Label: Play On, Warner; Format: Digital download, CD	1	—	1	3
Nouvelle génération: L'hymne de la vie	Released: 1 November 2019; Label: Play On, Warner; Format: Digital download, CD	7	—	27	36
"—" denotes an album that did not chart or was not released.

=== Live albums ===
Title	Details	Peak chart positions		
Title	Details	FRA	BEL (WA)	SWI
Le Live	Released: 17 February 2017; Label: Play On, M6 Interactions; Format: Digital download, CD	8	1	16

=== Compilation albums ===
Title	Details	Peak chart positions			Notes
Title	Details	FRA	BEL (WA)	SWI	Notes
Best Of	Released: 23 October 2020; Label: Play On; Format: Digital download, CD	51	85	–	Tracklist: 1. "On écrit sur les murs" (2:54); 2. "Si j'étais président" (3:49); 3. "L'oiseau et l'enfant" (3:02); 4. "Sauver le monde" (3:52); 5. "Mama Africa" (with Angélique Kidjo & Youssou Ndour) (2:49); 6. "Tout le bonheur du monde" (with Inaya) (3:21); 7. "L'hymne de la vie" (3:07); 8. "Les lacs du Connemara" (4:33); 9. "Imagine" (3:08); 10. "La tendresse" (2:36); 11. "Des ricochets" (3:32); 12. "Chacun sa route" (with Vitaa) (2:44); 13. "Santiano" (2:37); 14. "Last Christmas" (3:19); 15. "Sur ma route" (with Black M) (4:04); 16. "Le lion est mort ce soir" (2:35); 17. "Yalla" (with Amir) (4:27); 18. "Liberta" (3:33); 19. "Les liens de l'amitié" (3:35)

=== Other releases ===
Year	Title	Peak chart positions
Year	Title	FRA
2017	Un monde meilleur / Tout le bonheur du monde	15
2018	Forever United / Le live	62
2019	Coffret 4 albums	131

=== Singles ===
Title	Year	Peak chart positions	Album
Title	Year	FRA	Album
"On écrit sur les murs"	2015	3	Un monde meilleur
"Imagine"	2015	197	Un monde meilleur
"Last Christmas"	2015	95	Un monde meilleur
"Qui a le droit"	2016	195	Tout le bonheur du monde
"Destin"	2016	58	Tout le bonheur du monde
"L'oiseau et l'enfant"	2016	58	Tout le bonheur du monde
"Tout le bonheur de monde" (featuring Inaya)	2016	91	Tout le bonheur du monde
"Chante (Love Michel Fugain)"	2017	115	Chante la vie chante (Love Michel Fugain)
"Mama Africa" (featuring Angélique Kidjo and Youssou N'Dour)	2017	76	Forever United
"Chacun sa route" (featuring Vitaa)	2017	96	Forever United
"Pour changer le monde" (featuring LEGO)	2018	—	Au bout de nos reves
"La tendresse"	2018	-	Au bout de nos reves

=== Other charted songs ===
Title	Year	Peak chart positions	Album
Title	Year	FRA	Album
"Au soleil" (featuring Jenifer)	2017	145	Forever United
"Alors regarde" (featuring Patrick Bruel)	2017	199	Forever United
"Les lacs du Connemara"	2017	38	SARDOU et nous...
