= Muçolli =

Muçolli is an Albanian surname. Notable people with the surname include:

- Agon Muçolli (born 1998), Danish footballer
- Arbnor Muçolli (born 1999), Danish-Albanian football player
- Erza Muqoli (Albanian: Erëza Muçolli; born 2005), French singer
