= J'ai deux amours (song) =

1930 song performed by Josephine Baker

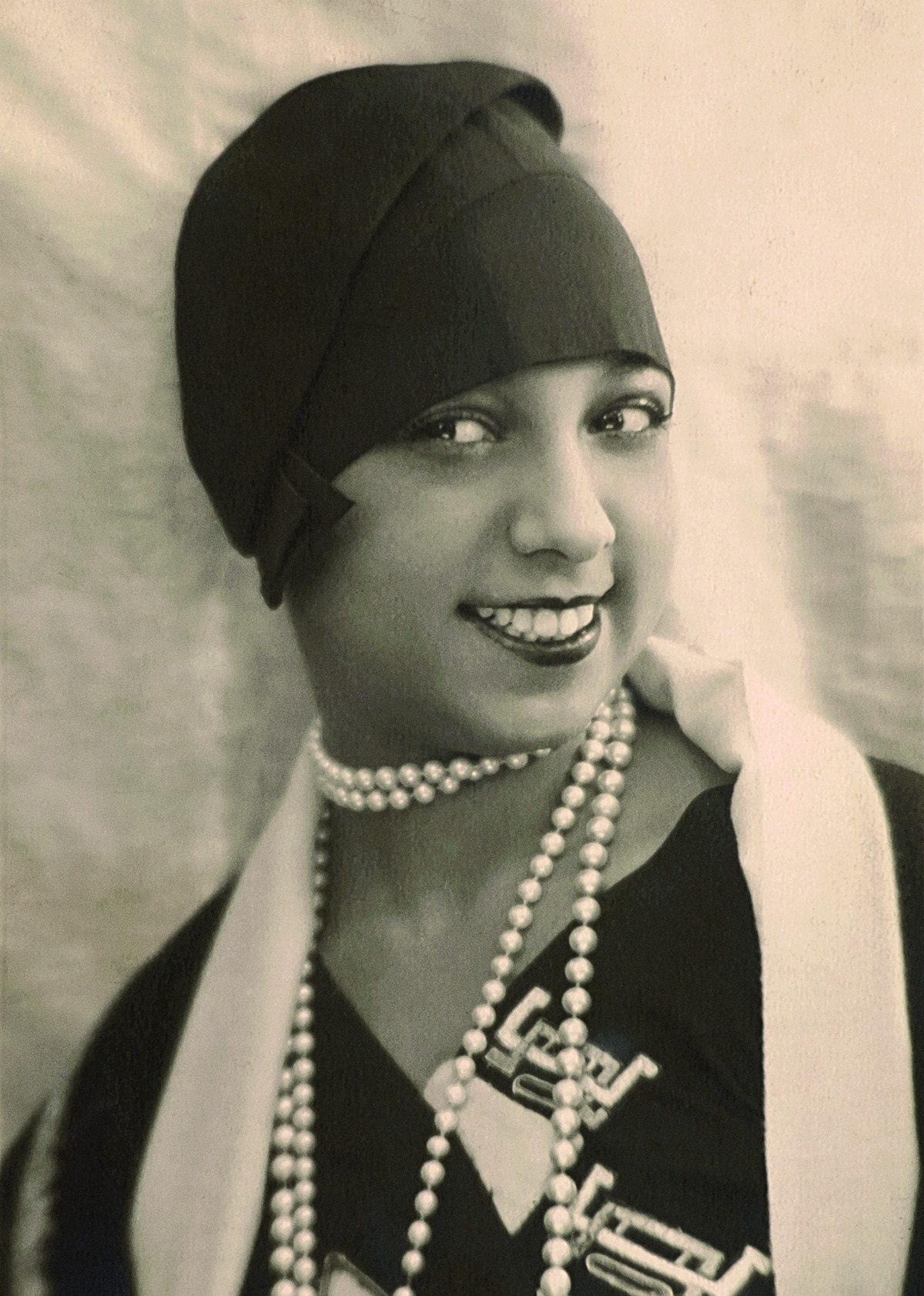
- Josephine Baker, c. 1930

Song by Josephine Baker
- Language: French
- A-side: "La Petite Tonkinoise"
- B-side: "J'ai deux amours"
- Released: 1930
- Length: 3:08
- Label: Columbia
- Composer: Vincent Scotto
- Lyricists: Géo Koger, Henri Varna

"J’ai deux amours" (English: "I Have Two Loves") is a song first performed in 1930 by Josephine Baker (accompanied by Adrien Lamy), with lyrics by Géo Koger and Henri Varna set to music by Vincent Scotto. The 1930 recording features accompaniment by the Casino de Paris's Mélodie Jazz orchestra, conducted by Edmond Mahieux.

== History ==
The new Paris qui remue (English: "Paris on the Move") revue at the Casino de Paris coincided with the 1931 Paris Colonial Exposition, a grandiose celebration of the French colonial empire, and so the occasion was a natural choice for the revival of the song "La Petite Tonkinoise".

In addition to "La Petite Tonkinoise", Vincent Scotto wrote "J'ai deux amours" for Josephine Baker, playing on both her exotic status as a Black American and her deep attachment to her adopted city. The two songs were released on the same record; it was the first time Josephine had sung in public, and "J'ai deux amours" was an immediate success. It subsequently became her signature song.

The original opening line of the chorus was "I have two loves: my country and Paris..." Before the Second World War, Baker, who had distanced herself from her native United States, both literally and figuratively, altered the second line of the chorus to "I have two loves: my country is Paris, and Pais is my country".

Baker re-recorded the song in 1953 with Jo Bouillon's orchestra. In 1968 she performed the song on the set of the French television show Le Palmarès des chansons.

It was Josephine Baker's signature song; until the end of her life, whenever she entered a stage, a television studio, or even a restaurant or nightclub, the orchestra would stop and invariably begin playing the opening bars of the song's theme. A scene of this kind is featured in the film La Rumba (1987), in which Vivian Reed played the role of Baker.

== Other versions ==
The song was sampled by French singer MC Jean Gab'1 on the track "Mes 2 amours" from his album Ma vie (2003).

The song was performed by French singer Zaz on her album Paris (2014) and by Cuba Libre Grupo on their Franco-Cuban album Capitan (2020). German singer Max Raabe recorded the song with German lyrics under the title "Ich bin ja nur eine Laune von dir" for his album Übers Meer (2010). Polish singer Mieczysław Fogg recorded the song with Polish lyrics under the title "Mały biały domek".

The song was covered in 2004 by American singer Madeleine Peyroux on her album Careless Love, and in 2005 by Dee Dee Bridgewater on her album J'ai deux amours.

In the video Les Chansons rétros by the French comedy trio Les Inconnus, Pascal Légitimus parodies the song.

The song was adapted into English by Barry Trivers and Jack Murray under the title "Two Loves Have I" and recorded by Ted Black and His Orchestra in 1931, followed by versions from Nat King Cole, Dean Martin, Perry Como, Frankie Laine, Big Joe Turner, The Diamonds, and many others. It was featured in a commercial for the Paris 2024 Olympic Games.

The Canadian singer Natasha St-Pier revisited the song in 2025 on her album Ma plus belle histoire d'amour, which is dedicated to the greatest songs of the Francophone musical heritage.

== In cinema ==
In Philip Kaufman's film Henry & June (1990), the song plays on a record player in a bordello, evoking the love triangle between Anaïs Nin, Henry Miller, and June Miller.

Josephine Baker's original version is used in Alain Resnais's film On connaît la chanson (Same Old Song, 1997); the film opens with a phone call from Hitler to von Choltitz, the military governor of Paris, ordering him to destroy the capital. Torn by doubt, von Choltitz immediately follows the call by singing "J'ai deux amours".

Madeleine Peyroux's version is featured in From Paris with Love, directed by Pierre Morel in 2010, and in the end credits of Volker Schlöndorff's Diplomacy (2014).

== Advertising ==
Around 1935, a poster advertising a coffee maker and a pressure cooker featured Josephine Baker alongside a slogan parodying the lyrics of the song: "I have two loves: my Auto-Thermos and my Perco-Thermos".

== Analysis ==
The Belgian literary journalist Sébastien Ministru has suggested that the song can be interpreted as a sort of unconscious coming-out, in reference to Josephine Baker's bisexuality.

== See also ==
- List of songs about Paris
