= Je rentre à la maison =

Je rentre à la maison (English: I am going home), may refer to:

- I'm Going Home (film)
- Je rentre à la maison, a song and album by Boulevard des Airs
