= La Complainte de la Butte =

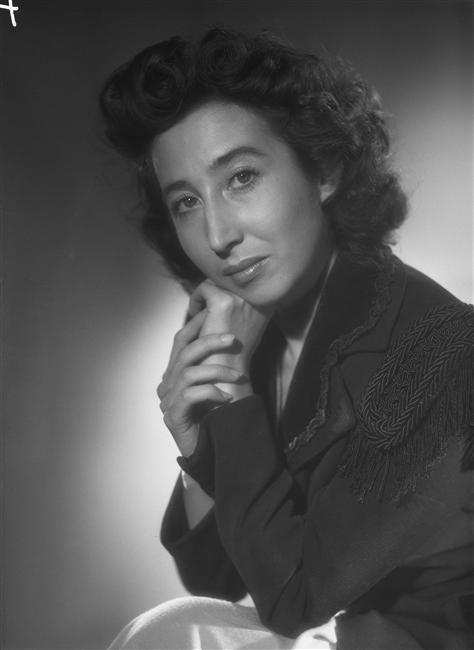

Song by Cora Vaucaire
- Released: 1955
- Recorded: December 27, 1954
- Genre: Chanson française, music-hall
- Length: 3:22
- Label: Pathé

"La Complainte de la Butte" (English: "The Lament of the Mound") is a French love song, written by Jean Renoir, set to music by Georges van Parys, and originally performed by Cora Vaucaire as a single and as part of the soundtrack for the 1955 film French Cancan written and directed by Jean Renoir.

== History ==
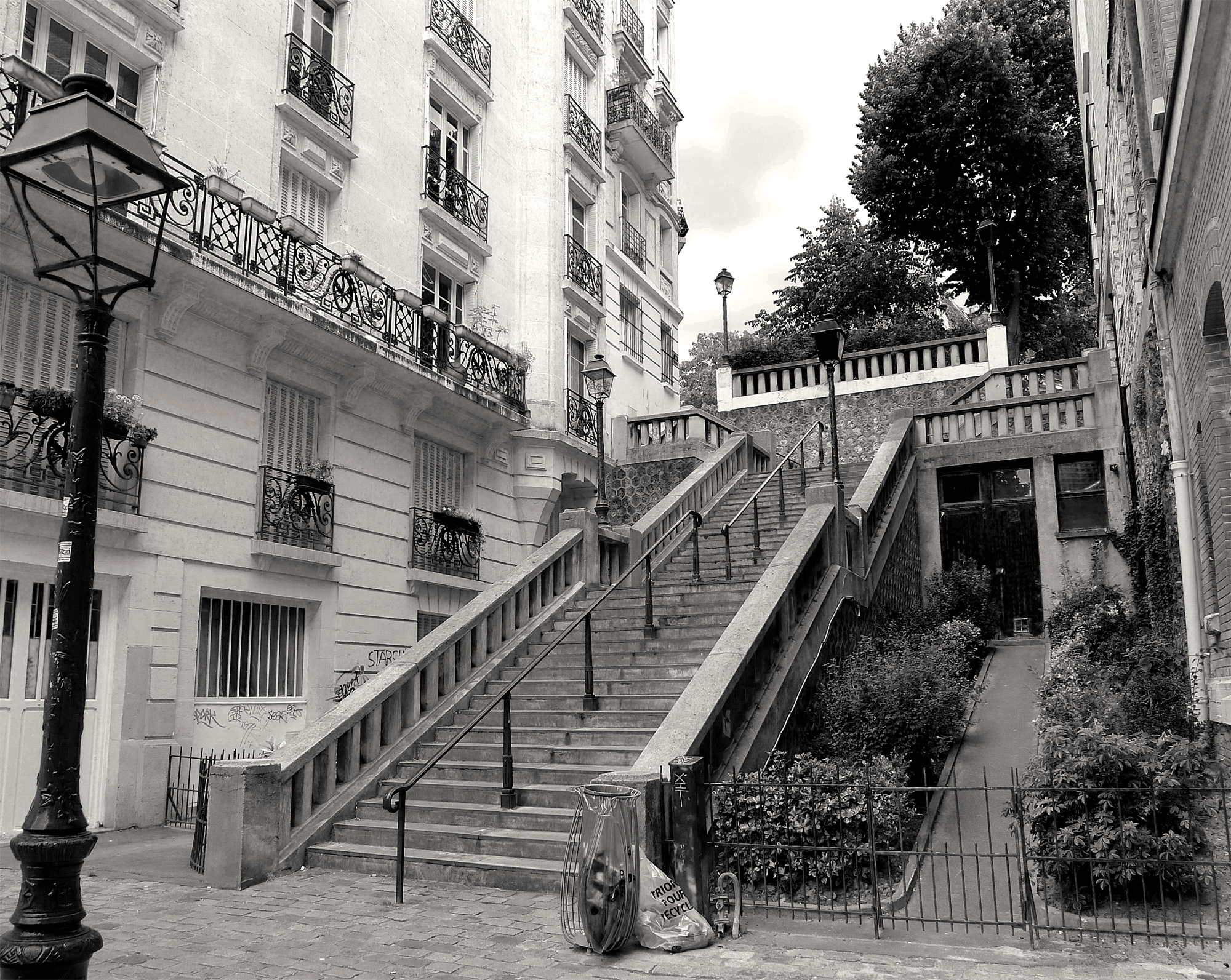
The stairs of the butte (the 'hill' or 'mound'), at the top of Saint-Vincent Street, at the hill of Montmartre in Paris.

The steps of the 'butte' (a small hill), seen from the top of the street of Saint-Vincent, and the 'wings of the mill' that are said to protect lovers in the song, are both references to the 'hill' of Montmartre in Paris. As the song's lyrics read, 'From the top of street of Saint-Vincent, a poet and a stranger loved each other in the space of an instant, but he [the poet] never saw her again... Princess of the street, be welcome to my broken heart, my little beggar, I feel your cuffs seeking my hands, I feel your chest and your slender waist, I forget my sorrow, I feel on your lips the scent of the fever of a malnourished child, and under your caress, I feel an intoxication that annihilates me...' (in the original French, 'En haut de la rue Saint-Vincent, un poète et une inconnue s'aimèrent l'espace d'un instant, mais il ne l'a jamais revue ... Princesse de la rue, sois la bienvenue dans mon cœur brisé, ma petite mendigote, je sens ta menotte qui cherche ma main, je sens ta poitrine et ta taille fine, j'oublie mon chagrin, je sens sur tes lèvres une odeur de fièvre de gosse mal nourrie, et sous ta caresse, je sens une ivresse qui m'anéantit...'.

In the film French Cancan, Henri Danglard (Jean Gabin), the romanticised fictional founder and director of the Moulin Rouge (located at the foot of the hill of Montmartre), introduces a new singer, Esther Georges (Anna Amendola; sung by Cora Vaucaire), into his cabaret and music hall, where she sings the Complainte de la Butte for the first time.

== Covers and adaptations ==
Following Cora Vaucaire, this 'complainte' (or lament) was covered by a number of performers, including André Claveau, Patachou (1955), Marcel Mouloudji (1956), the duo of Barbara and Frank Alamo (1964), Renzo Gallo (1974), Francis Lemarque (1988), Lambert Wilson (1997), the duo of Patrick Bruel and Francis Cabrel (on the album Entre deux, released in 2002), Hélène Ségara (2008), Daniel Darc (released posthumously, in 2013), Rufus Wainwright, Zaz (on the album Paris, released in 2014), and Sirius Plan (on the album Dog River Sessions, released in 2015).

== Cinema and film music ==
- 1955: French Cancan, by Jean Renoir, sung by Cora Vaucaire.
- 2001: Moulin Rouge, by Baz Luhrmann, sung by Rufus Wainwright.

== See also ==
- List of songs about Paris
