= Zaz (album) =

Studio album by Zaz
- Released: 10 May 2010
- Recorded: 2010
- Genres: Pop; jazz; blues; soul; R&B
- Length: 38:59
- Language: French
- Labels: Play On; Sony
- Producers: Germain Guyot; Raphaël Haroche; Xavier Plèche; Alban Sautour; Kerredine Soltani

Zaz chronology
Zaz (2010)	Recto Verso (2013)

Singles from Zaz
- 1. "Je veux" Released: 10 May 2010; 2. "Le long de la route" Released: September 2010; 3. "La fée" Released: February 2011; 4. "Éblouie par la nuit" Released: November 2011

Zaz is the debut studio album by French singer Zaz, released on 10 May 2010 by Play On and Sony Music. It spawned two singles, "Je veux" and "Le long de la route", which achieved success in Belgium (Wallonia). The album itself was a commercial success, topping the charts in Belgium, France, and Poland.

== Background and writing ==
Zaz co-wrote six songs on the album, and French singer Raphaël Haroche wrote three songs.

== Critical reception ==
Professional ratings
Review scores
Source	Rating
AllMusic	4/5 stars

Zaz received mixed reviews from musical critics. Le Figaro said the singer's voice "upsets and wins over". The editors admitted they were moved by "her small skinned side" and praised "the urban blues of "Trop sensible", or the upsetting "Port Coton" or songs with realistic accents such as "Ni oui ni non" or "Dans ma rue"". Libération stated that her single "Je veux" is "between 'J'veux du soleil' by Au P'tit Bonheur and the competitive 'P'tit kawa' by Karimouche—other examples of good-natured variety supercharged for optimism." The paper also wrote that "her natural sound—she is capable of laughing in the middle of a song—makes up for a rather simple technique, in the spirit of a jazz world not too concerned with such idiosyncrasies". Le Nouvel Observateur deemed "Je veux" a song with "anti-consumerism" lyrics that "immediately catches the ear". Le Parisien believed that her "songs with realistic lyrics marked the spirits... She reflects the mindset of youth, a bit tortured but full of hope". L'Humanité praised a "very direct and friendly link" between the young singer and her public, saying: "Welcome to Zaz's world of good mood".

More critical, Valérie Lehoux of Télérama argued that the singer has "unquestionably quite unusual vocal abilities", but considered her album as "too fragmented to be easily likeable, as we must navigate without a sextant from rather old-fashioned French songs to the free variety, to a more or less danceable neo-R&B." She added that the singer has demonstrated her singing abilities but her songs soon lose their attraction and collapse under "too cumbersome and too expected" references. Les Inrockuptibles gave a negative review of the album and of the lead single.

== Track listing ==
No.	Title	Lyrics	Music	Producer(s)	Length
1.	"Les Passants"	Isabelle Geffroy	Geffroy; Tryss	Alban Sautour	3:33
2.	"Je veux"	Kerredine Soltani	Soltani; Tryss	Soltani; Sautour	3:39
3.	"Le Long de la route"	Geffroy	Mickaël Geraud	Xavier Plèche; Germain Guyot	3:37
4.	"La Fée"	Raphaël Haroche	Haroche	Haroche	2:53
5.	"Trop sensible"	Geffroy	Geffroy	Haroche	3:59
6.	"Prends garde à ta langue"	Geffroy	Geffroy; Dino Cirone	Guyot; Sautour	3:41
7.	"Ni oui ni non"	Geffroy; Soltani	Vivian Roost; Soltani	Sautour	3:31
8.	"Port coton"	Haroche	Haroche	Haroche	2:56
9.	"J'aime à nouveau"	Geffroy	Geraud	Sautour	3:50
10.	"Dans ma rue"	Jacques Datin	Datin	Guyot	4:40
11.	"Éblouie par la nuit"	Haroche	Haroche	Haroche	2:40

== Charts ==
=== Weekly charts ===
Weekly chart performance for Zaz
Chart (2010–2014)	Peak position
Argentine Albums (CAPIF)	10
Austrian Albums (Ö3 Austria)	12
Belgian Albums (Ultratop Flanders)	51
Belgian Albums (Ultratop Wallonia)	1
Canadian Albums (Nielsen SoundScan)	57
Croatian Albums (HDU)	2
Czech Albums (ČNS IFPI)	3
Dutch Albums (Album Top 100)	56
European Albums (Billboard)	11
French Albums (SNEP)	1
German Albums (Offizielle Top 100)	3
Greek International Albums (IFPI)	3
Italian Albums (FIMI)	19
Japanese Albums (Oricon)	58
Polish Albums (ZPAV)	1
Russian Albums (2M)	3
Spanish Albums (Promusicae)	93
Swiss Albums (Schweizer Hitparade)	10
US World Albums (Billboard)	5

=== Year-end charts ===
2010 year-end chart performance for Zaz
Chart (2010)	Position
Belgian Albums (Ultratop Wallonia)	6
European Albums (Billboard)	46
French Albums (SNEP)	5
Swiss Albums (Schweizer Hitparade)	36

2011 year-end chart performance for Zaz
Chart (2011)	Position
Austrian Albums (Ö3 Austria)	32
Belgian Albums (Ultratop Wallonia)	7
French Albums (SNEP)	5
German Albums (Offizielle Top 100)	7
Russian Albums (2M)	7
Swiss Albums (Schweizer Hitparade)	22

2012 year-end chart performance for Zaz
Chart (2012)	Position
Belgian Mid Price Albums (Ultratop Wallonia)	8
German Albums (Offizielle Top 100)	63
Russian Albums (2M)	21
Swiss Albums (Schweizer Hitparade)	100

2013 year-end chart performance for Zaz
Chart (2013)	Position
Swiss Albums (Schweizer Hitparade)	88

== Certifications ==
Certifications for Zaz
Region	Certification	Certified units/sales
Austria (IFPI Austria)	Platinum	20,000^{*}
Belgium (BRMA)	3× Platinum	90,000^{*}
France (SNEP)	2× Diamond	1,000,000^{*}
Germany (BVMI)	2× Platinum	400,000^{^}
Poland (ZPAV)	2× Platinum	40,000^{*}
Russia (NFPF)	Platinum	10,000^{*}
Switzerland (IFPI Switzerland)	2× Platinum	60,000^{^}
^{*} Sales figures based on certification alone.^{^} Shipments figures based on certification alone.
