= Isa (Zaz album) =

2021 studio album by Zaz

Studio album by Zaz
- Released: 22 October 2021
- Studio: The Church (Amsterdam); Studio 72 (London); Atelier 18; Studio Garage (Paris); La Fabrique (Saint-Rémy-de-Provence); ICP (Brussels)
- Length: 47:53
- Language: French
- Label: Parlophone
- Producer: Reyn

Zaz chronology
Effet miroir (2018)	Isa (2021)	Sains et saufs (2025)

Singles from Isa
- 1. "Imagine" Released: 28 July 2021; 2. "Le jardin des larmes" Released: 17 December 2021

Isa is the fifth studio album by French singer Zaz, released on 22 October 2021 by Parlophone. The album takes its title from the artist's real name, Isabelle Geffroy, since its contents were more personal than her previous albums. It reached the top 10 of the album charts in five European countries. The Nouvelle edition of the album was released on 9 December 2022.

== Background and origins ==
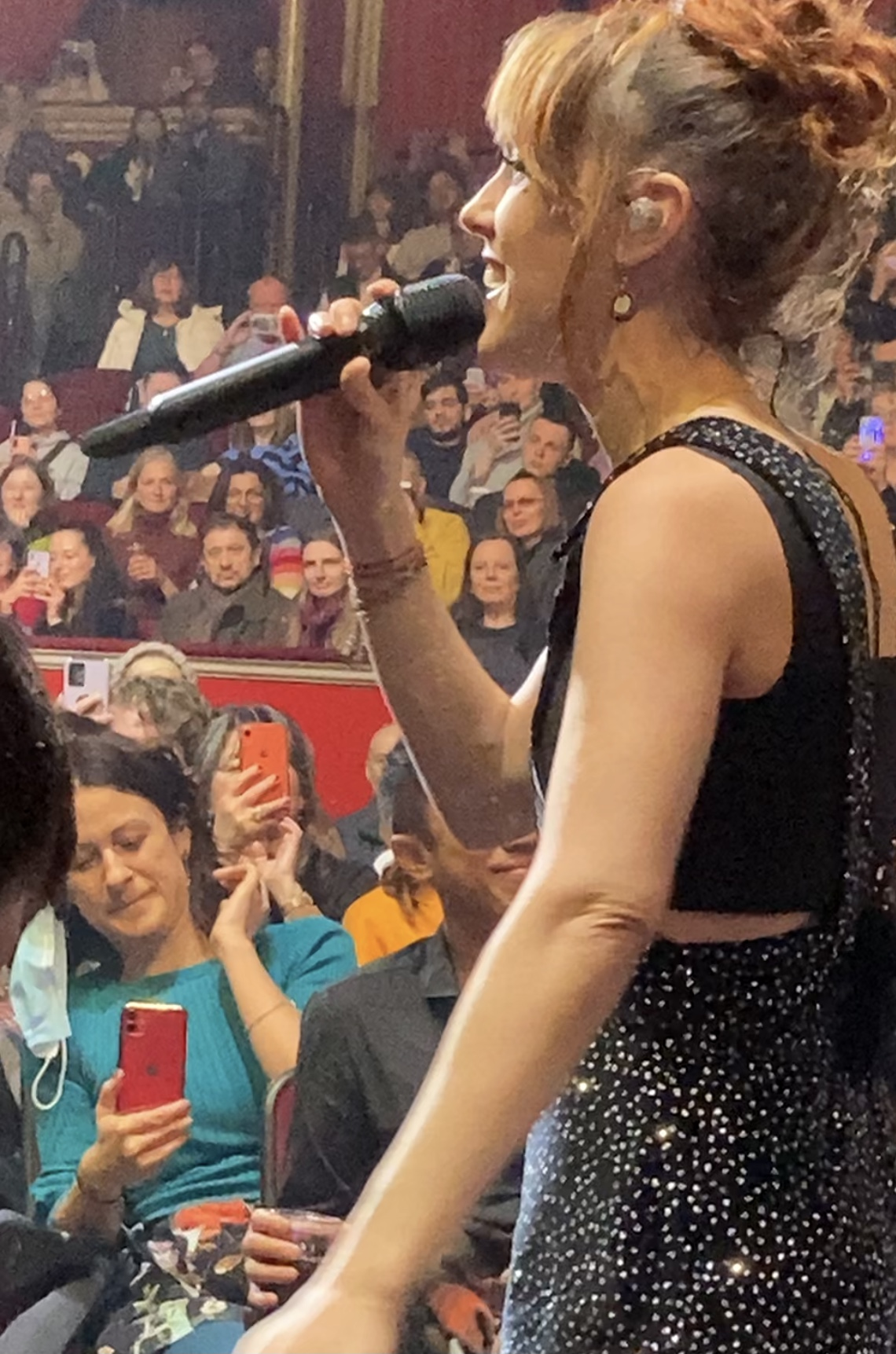
Zaz opening her concert at the Royal Albert Hall, London, on 31 March 2022 with "Les jours heureux" from Isa

After nine years of intense work following her commercial breakthrough in 2010, Zaz decided in 2019 to take a break in order to "take care of myself…I'm trying to say to myself if I want to help the world, I've got to be well." During her hiatus she became a vegetarian and got married. Although Zaz described the contents of Isa as more "personal" than her previous albums, she wrote none of the tracks herself. Instead she communicated her feelings to a team of writers who tried to best capture them in words and music.

== Reception ==
Isa received a mixed reception.

Although Laut.de praised the duet with Rammstein's Till Lindemann "Le jardin des larmes" as being "somehow reminiscent of a classic art song" and credits Tout là-haut for "letting Zaz's voice speak for itself", the overall conclusion is that a, "monotony of beautiful instrumentals, beautiful voice and beautiful words prevails overall. It's all nice, but also pretty boring."

Belgium's Radio 1 made Isa its album of the week on release, referring to the album's themes of "simplicity, openness and diversity" showcased by "that voice, that presence."

A positive review appeared in Le Devoir which concluded that by being both herself and her enhanced creation "Zaz chez Isa" were finally reunited and complete.

In April 2022, Le Centre de la Musique certified Isa gold for export sales outside France in 2021 and in July 2022 the album achieved gold certification for overall sales.

== Promotional tour ==
Zaz promoted Isa performing most of its tracks during her "Organique" tour of France, Germany, UK, Spain, Switzerland, Netherlands, Belgium, Luxembourg, Hungary, Bulgaria, Poland and the Czech Republic. The Canadian leg of the tour was cancelled since Zaz refused to comply with the country's requirement that she be vaccinated against COVID-19.

== Track listing ==
Isa track listing
No.	Title	Writer(s)	Length
1.	"Les Jours heureux" (Happy Days)	Barcella	4:07
2.	"Imagine" (Imagine)	Barcella; Laurent Lamarca	2:51
3.	"De couleurs vives" (Bright Colours)	Jules Prouha; Julie Prouha; Sylvain Duthu	3:28
4.	"Ce que tu es dans ma vie" (What You Are in My Life)	Antoine Graugnard; Ben Mazué; Davide Esposito; Jean-Etienne Maillard; Renaud Rebillaud	3:04
5.	"Tout là-haut" (All the Way Up There)	Barcella	4:53
6.	"Il faut qu'on se donne" (You Have to Give Something to Yourself)	Frederic Volovitch; Olivier Volovitch	2:34
7.	"Exister" (Existing)	AuDen; Vincha	3:42
8.	"A perte de rue" (To the End of the Road)	Graugnard; Esposito; Rebillaud	3:21
9.	"Comme tu voudras" (As You'll Wish)	F. Volovitch; O. Volovitch	4:31
10.	"Avec son frère" (With His Brother)	F. Volovitch; O. Volovitch	3:11
11.	"Le Jardin des larmes" (The Garden of Tears) (featuring Till Lindemann)	Lindemann; Myriam Perez; Thierry Faure	4:03
12.	"Le Chant des grives" (The Song of the Thrushes)	Noé Preszow	5:03
13.	"Et le reste" (And the Rest)	Barcella	3:06
Total length:			47:53

Nouvelle edition bonus tracks
No.	Title	Writer(s)	Length
14.	"L'Une ou l'Autre" (One or the Other)	Barcella	3:06
15.	"Sans en avoir l'air" (Without Looking Like It)	Barcella	3:49
16.	"Animaux fragiles" (Fragile Animals) (with Ycare)	Axelle Red; Ycare	3:15
17.	"Serendipia"	Esposito; Mazué; Maillard; Lamarca; Paula Rojo	2:54
Total length:			60:00

== Charts ==
=== Weekly charts ===
Weekly chart performance for Isa
Chart (2021)	Peak position
Austrian Albums (Ö3 Austria)	10
Belgian Albums (Ultratop Flanders)	15
Belgian Albums (Ultratop Wallonia)	4
Croatian International Albums (HDU)	2
Czech Albums (ČNS IFPI)	11
French Albums (SNEP)	2
German Albums (Offizielle Top 100)	10
Hungarian Albums (MAHASZ)	6
Polish Albums (ZPAV)	24
Spanish Albums (Promusicae)	48
Swiss Albums (Schweizer Hitparade)	5

=== Year-end charts ===
Year-end chart performance for Isa
Chart (2021)	Position
Belgian Albums (Ultratop Wallonia)	110
Swiss Albums (Schweizer Hitparade)	72
