= Sains et saufs =

2025 studio album by Zaz

Studio album by Zaz
- Released: 19 September 2025
- Studio: Studio Radio Kitchen
- Length: 48:23
- Language: French
- Label: Tôt ou tard
- Producers: Ambroise Willaume, Romaine Descampe, Egil "Ziggy" Franzen, Jet

Zaz chronology
Isa (2021)	Sains et saufs (2025)

Singles from Sains et saufs
- 1. "Je pardonne/Sains et saufs" Released: 18 March 2025; 2. "Mon coeur tu es fou" Released: 30 May 2025; 3. "Cerca de ti (Mon amour)" Released: 6 June 2025; 4. "On peut comme ca" Released: 9 July 2025; 5. "Une passerelle vers la mer" Released: 29 August 2025

Sains et saufs (French for 'safe and sound') is the sixth studio album by the French singer Zaz, released on 19 September 2025 by Tôt ou tard. It charted in 5 European countries. On 27 March 2026, a further 7 tracks were published as Disc 1 of the "Deluxe" edition, with the original 14 tracks forming Disc 2.

== Background and origins ==
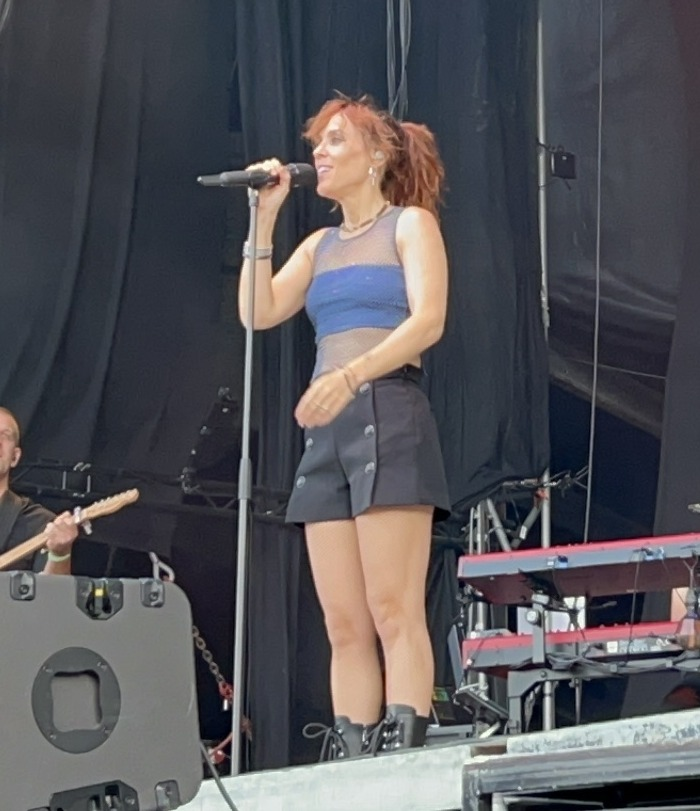
Zaz performing "Je pardonne" at the start of her set at Lakelive Festival, Biel, Switzerland on 8 August 2025

Sains et saufs was Zaz’s first album to be released following her move to the Tôt ou Tard record label, after her contract with Warner expired. Zaz met Tôt ou Tard's director Vincent Frerebeau and having felt "joy in my body which I chose to trust," decided to sign up with them as they had the "strength of a large company and the qualities of an independent label."

The theme of the album is how Zaz, having "put myself in lots of danger", has focussed since the age of 20 on "finding complete freedom, undoing everything which doesn't belong to me, things which society wanted me to be, restrictions." Zaz described the album as being “particularly intimate” as it addresses her coming to terms with the challenges of her past, thereby representing a continuation of the theme of its predecessor, Isa, which was released after Zaz had rebased herself during the COVID-19 lockdowns.

One of the first of the 6 tracks to be published before the release of the full album encapsulated the album’s theme. “Je pardonne” (I forgive) sets out Zaz’s response to the criticisms and insults levelled at her since becoming famous, namely forgiving in order to be able to move forward. Other songs exemplifying the album’s theme include “Que des liens” which reflects on Zaz’s reaction to the death of her father in 2023 and “Au pays de merveilles” which is based on Zaz’s experience of having been addicted to drugs from the “age of 13 until my ex-boyfriend was killed when I was 20.”

== Critical reception ==
Sains et saufs received a generally favourable reception.

Le Soir awarded the album 3 stars and Baz'art described it as Zaz's best since her first album in 2010. In November 2025 RTL France announced that the album was one of the 5 finalists for its "Album of the Year 2025" award.

A number of reviews reflected on how the intimacy of the album extends beyond its own content. Radio Panane summarised the album as "sober, intense and profoundly human, it narrates an inner story which resonates well beyond the singer's story.". Meanwhile Music Addict concluded that the album was, "much more than an album; it is an artistic and humanist manifesto, a work that is absolutely worth discovering."

In October 2026, the album was certified Gold by SNEP.

== Charts ==
=== Weekly charts ===
Weekly chart performance for Sains et saufs
Chart (2025)	Peak position
Austrian Albums (Ö3 Austria)	22
Belgian Albums (Ultratop Flanders)	9
Belgian Albums (Ultratop Wallonia)	2
French Albums (SNEP)	3
German Albums (Offizielle Top 100)	13
Swiss Albums (Schweizer Hitparade)	5

== Track listing ==
Sains et saufs track listing
No.	Title	Writer(s)	Length
1.	"Je pardonne" (I forgive)	Noé Preszow	3:29
2.	"Au pays des merveilles" (In wonderland)	Preszow	3:43
3.	"Mon coeur tu es fou" (My heart, you're crazy)	Preszow, Forugh Farrokhzad, André Velter	3:23
4.	"Mon sourire" (My smile)	Mathieu Ladeveze	2:51
5.	"Mon Dieu" (My God)	Tristan Salvati, Vianney	2:52
6.	"On peut comme ca" (You can do it like that)	Preszow, vincent Dewannemaeker	4:04
7.	"Sains et saufs" (Safe and sound)	Jean-Etienne Maillard, Laurent Lamarca, Zaz	3:41
8.	"J'imagine que tu sais" (I imagine that you know)	Raphaël	3:29
9.	"La Flamme" (The flame)	Jean Grillet, Lamarca, Zaz	3:12
10.	"Un enfant pour toujours" (A child for ever)	Preszow, Zaz	3:31
11.	"Que des liens" (Nothing but connections)	Preszow	3:50
12.	"Bleu de la nuit" (Blue of the night)	Raphaël	3:17
13.	"Une passerelle vers la mer (duet with Raphaël)" (A footbridge to the sea)	Raphaël	3:20
14.	"Cerca de ti (Mon amour)" (Close to you (my love))	Maillard, Lamarca, Zaz, Luis Frochoso	3:41
Total length:			48:23
