= Paris (Zaz album) =

Studio album by Zaz
- Released: 10 November 2014
- Studios: La Frette (La Frette-sur-Seine, France) (Note: Tracks 1–3, 6, 9, 10, 12 and 13); La Grande Armée (Paris) (Note: Track 4); Guillaume Tell (Suresnes, France) (Note: Tracks 5, 7 and 11); CBE (Paris) (Note: Track 8)
- Genre: Chanson
- Length: 43:26
- Language: French
- Labels: Jo & Co; Play On; Warner
- Producers: Ilan Abou; John Clayton; Thierry Faure; Eric Filet (a.k.a. Rycko Filey); Quincy Jones

Zaz chronology
Recto Verso (2013)	Paris (2014)	Sur la route (2015)

Paris is the third studio album by French singer Zaz, released on 10 November 2014 by Jo & Co, Play On and Warner Music France.

== Track listing ==
No.	Title	Lyrics	Music	Producer(s)	Length
1.	"Paris sera toujours Paris"	Albert Willemetz	Casimir Oberfeld	Ilan Abou; Thierry Faure	2:58
2.	"Sous le ciel de Paris"	Jean Dréjac	Hubert Giraud	Abou; Faure	3:18
3.	"La Parisienne"	Michel Grisolia; Françoise Mallet-Joris	Marie-Paule Belle	Abou; Faure	3:00
4.	"Dans mon Paris" (Swing Manouche version)	Isabelle Geffroy; Abou; Faure	Guillaume Juhel; Abou; Faure	Abou; Faure	3:18
5.	"Les Champs-Élysées"	Michael Anthony Deighan; Michael Wilshaw; Pierre Delanoë^{[a]}	Deighan; Wilshaw	John Clayton	2:55
6.	"À Paris"	Francis Lemarque	Lemarque	Abou; Faure; Eric Filet (a.k.a. Rycko Filey)	3:00
7.	"I Love Paris – J'aime Paris" (featuring Nikki Yanofsky)	Cole Porter; Mathieu Boogaerts^{[a]}	Porter	Quincy Jones	4:01
8.	"La Romance de Paris" (featuring Thomas Dutronc)	Charles Trenet; Léon Cauliac	Trenet	Abou; Faure	3:31
9.	"Paris canaille"	Léo Ferré	Ferré	Abou; Faure	3:54
10.	"La Complainte de la Butte"	Jean Lenoir	Georges Van Parys	Abou; Faure	3:31
11.	"J'aime Paris au mois de Mai" (featuring Charles Aznavour)	Aznavour	Aznavour; Pierre Roche	Clayton	4:05
12.	"Paris, l'après-midi"	Abou; Faure	John Lewis	Abou; Faure	2:24
13.	"J'ai deux amours"	Georges Konyn; Henri Vantard	Vincent Baptiste Scotto	Abou; Faure	3:26
Total length:					43:26

=== Notes ===
- ^{^[a]} signifies French adaptation

== Charts ==
=== Weekly charts ===
Weekly chart performance for Paris
Chart (2014–2016)	Peak position
Austrian Albums (Ö3 Austria)	4
Belgian Albums (Ultratop Flanders)	8
Belgian Albums (Ultratop Wallonia)	2
Canadian Albums (Billboard)	9
Czech Albums (ČNS IFPI)	3
Dutch Albums (Album Top 100)	54
French Albums (SNEP)	2
German Albums (Offizielle Top 100)	5
Greek Albums (IFPI)	18
Hungarian Albums (MAHASZ)	11
Japanese Albums (Oricon)	38
Polish Albums (ZPAV)	2
Spanish Albums (Promusicae)	17
Spanish Albums (Promusicae) Spanish edition	58
Swiss Albums (Schweizer Hitparade)	3

=== Year-end charts ===
2014 year-end chart performance for Paris
Chart (2014)	Position
Austrian Albums (Ö3 Austria)	52
Belgian Albums (Ultratop Flanders)	91
Belgian Albums (Ultratop Wallonia)	45
French Albums (SNEP)	15
German Albums (Offizielle Top 100)	43
Swiss Albums (Schweizer Hitparade)	72

2015 year-end chart performance for Paris
Chart (2015)	Position
Belgian Albums (Ultratop Flanders)	34
Belgian Albums (Ultratop Wallonia)	30
French Albums (SNEP)	49
Swiss Albums (Schweizer Hitparade)	95

2016 year-end chart performance for Paris
Chart (2016)	Position
Belgian Albums (Ultratop Flanders)	176
Polish Albums (ZPAV)	19

== Certifications ==
Certifications for Paris
Region	Certification	Certified units/sales
Austria (IFPI Austria)	Gold	7,500^{*}
Belgium (BRMA)	Gold	15,000^{*}
France (SNEP)	3× Platinum	300,000^{*}
Poland (ZPAV)	2× Platinum	40,000^{‡}
Switzerland (IFPI Switzerland)	Gold	10,000^{^}
^{*} Sales figures based on certification alone.^{^} Shipments figures based on certification alone.^{‡} Sales+streaming figures based on certification alone.
