= Erza Muqoli =

French singer (born 2005)

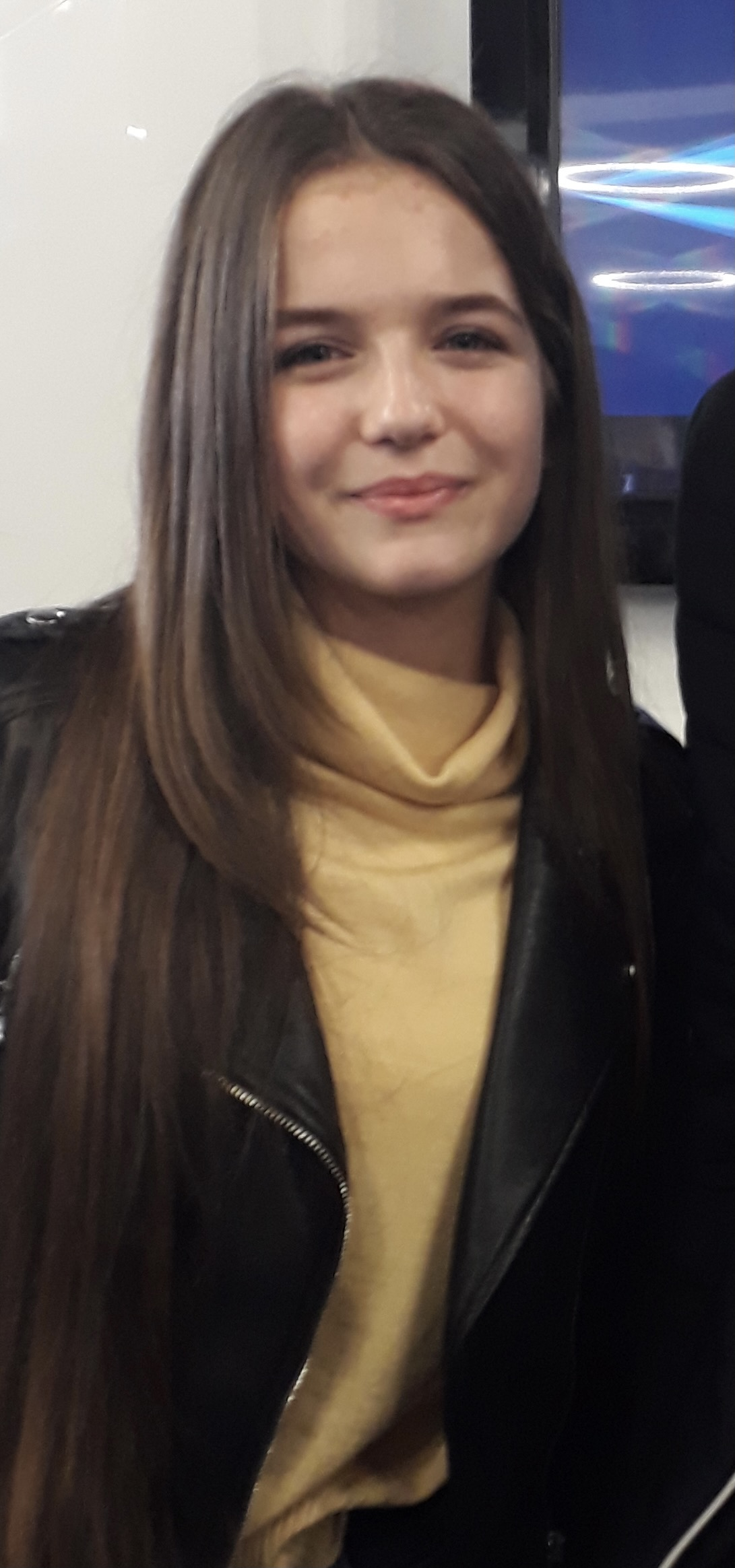
- Erza Muqoli during a meeting at Brignais

Background information
- Born: 21 September 2005 (age 20); Sarreguemines, Moselle, France
- Origin: Kosovo
- Genres: Pop
- Occupations: Singer, actress
- Instruments: Voice, Piano
- Years active: 2014–present
- Label: VF Musiques / Tôt ou tard

Erza Muqoli (born 21 September 2005) is a French singer known for having been a contestant on the ninth season (2014–2015) of M6's La France a un incroyable talent and a founding member (from 2015 to 2018) of the child pop group Kids United.

== Background ==
Muqoli was born in Sarreguemines in the Moselle department. Her parents are ethnic Albanians from Kosovo; her family emigrated to France in the early 1990s. She is the youngest of four children. She studied piano and vocals at the Sarralbe music school starting at the age of 7.

In 2014–2015, Muqoli participated in the ninth season of the French television show La France a un incroyable talent (lit. "France has an incredible talent"). For her first audition, she performed Stromae's "Papaoutai", accompanying herself on piano. Gilbert Rozon buzzed and said "no", but the other judges said "yes". After performing well in the semifinal where she sang Zaz's "Éblouie par la nuit", provoking a standing ovation from the audience, Muqoli advanced to the final, where she sang Édith Piaf's "La Vie en rose", finishing in 3rd place.

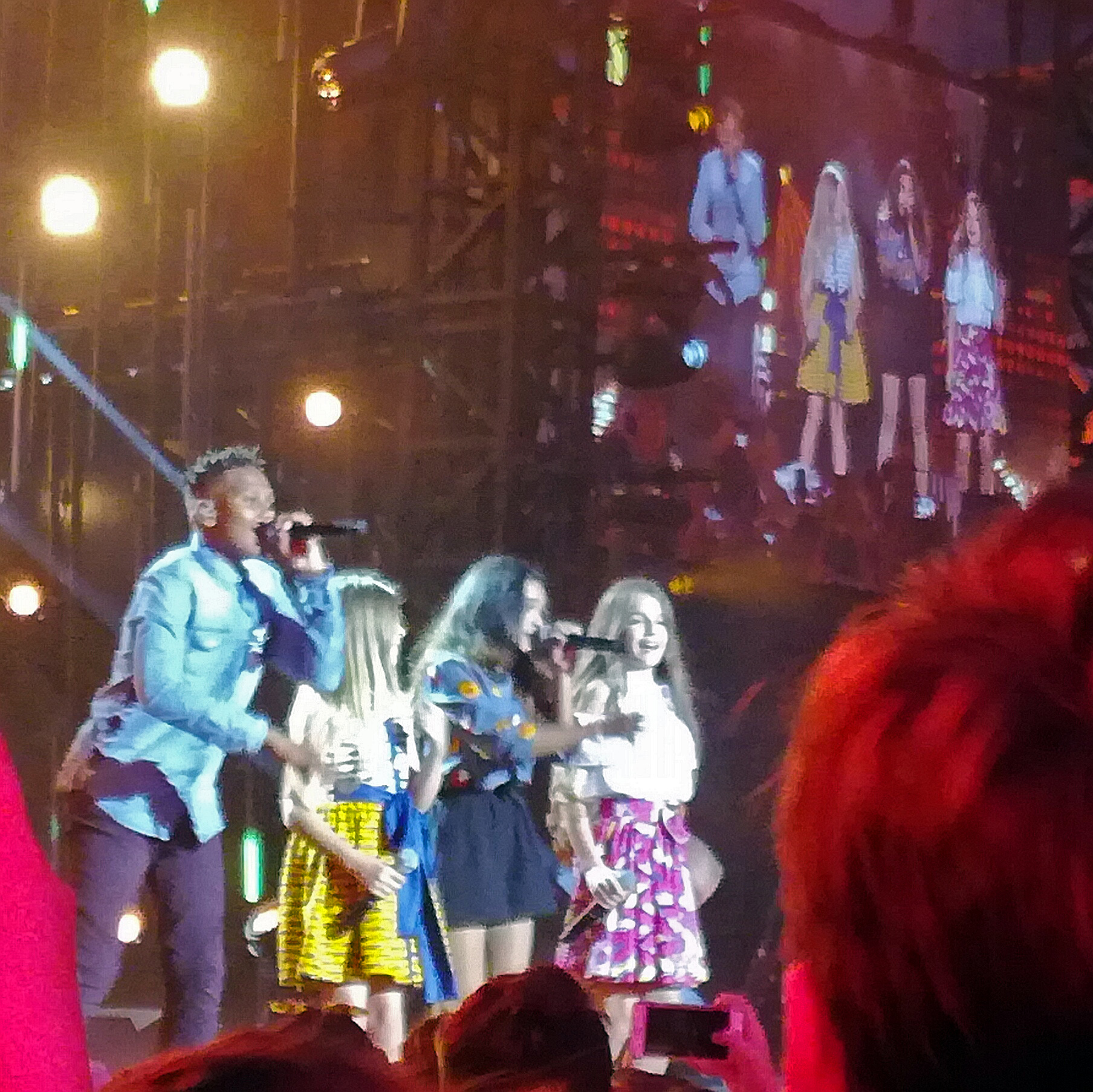
Erza (right) performing as a member of the group Kids United in July 2017.

In 2015, Muqoli continued her musical career as a founding member of Kids United, a child musical group formed as part of a campaign of UNICEF France with the intention of covering "the most beautiful songs celebrating peace and hope". She was 10 years old when the group's first single, "On écrit sur les murs", became a hit, reaching number 3 on the French singles chart and spending twelve weeks in the top 10. Kids United went on to release three studio albums through late 2017, all of which reached number 1 on the French albums chart. In 2016, she lent her voice to the character of Lucie in the French dub of the Québécois animated 3D film Snowtime!. In May 2018, after almost three years of success, the original formation of Kids United separated, giving way to a new group of five children (named Kids United New Generation, or K.U.N.G.).

At the end of May 2019, Muqoli released her first solo single, titled "Je chanterai". The song, written and composed by Vianney, reached number 36 in French-speaking Belgium (as well as number 28 in the airplay chart) and number 123 on the French download chart. On 6 September 2019, Muqoli unveiled an acoustic ballad titled "Dommage", also written and composed by Vianney. In the week of 18 October, the song entered the French download chart at number 96.

Muqoli's first solo album, titled simply Erza Muqoli, was released on 25 October 2019, entering the French album chart (for the week of 1 November) at number 31 and the Walloon album chart at number 37. The entire album was written and composed by Vianney. On 19 October, six days prior to the album's release, a filmed concert was itself released – Erza Muqoli: le concert privé au cinéma (lit. "Erza Muqoli: Private concert at the cinema") – in which Muqoli presented songs from the album as a pre-premiere.

In 2020, Muqoli was set to embark on a tour starting in Ludres on 14 March and notably including a concert at The Olympia in Paris on 4 April. This was initially postponed, but then later cancelled due to Coronavirus disease 2019.

In 2020, Muqoli joined the Green Team; a group of artists who sing to raise awareness of ecological issues. Erza was the lead in the group's first single entitled "Les enfants du monde".

Since October 2020, Muqoli has an official online store that sells her CD album as well as clothing and accessories. Its launch coincided with the one-year anniversary of the release of her solo album.

== Discography ==
=== Albums ===
Album details	Charts				
Album details	FRA	FRA Phys	FRA DL	BEL (Wa)	SUI
Erza Muqoli: Released: 25 October 2019; Label: VF Musiques (Tôt ou tard); Format: CD, vinyl, digital download, streaming	31	13	15	37	95

=== Singles ===
Title	Year	Charts			Album
Title	Year	BEL (Wa)	BEL (Wa) Airplay	FRA DL	Album
"Je chanterai"	2019	36	28	123	Erza Muqoli

=== Other charted songs ===
Title	Year	Charts	Album
Title	Year	FRA DL	Album
"Dommage"	2019	96	Erza Muqoli

== Filmography ==
=== French dubbing ===
- La Bataille géante de boules de neige (2015) – Lucie

=== Filmed concerts ===
- Erza Muqoli : le concert privé au cinéma (2019)
