= Recto Verso (album) =

2013 studio album by Zaz

Studio album by Zaz
- Released: 13 May 2013
- Recorded: 2012–2013
- Studio: La Frette (La Frette-sur-Seine) (Note: Tracks 2, 3 and 11); Sysmo Records (Paris) (Note: Track 6); Gonzo (Note: Vocal recording on track 11; additional recording on tracks 3 and 11); Boubou (Note: Vocal recording on track 3); Kensaltown Recording (London) (Note: Tracks 7, 12 and 14); Labomatic (Paris) (Note: Tracks 5, 8, 9 and 13); Hyperion (Marseille) (Note: Track 10); CBE (Paris) (Note: Additional recording on track 10); Little Big Sound (Nashville) (Note: Strings recording on track 14)
- Genre: Pop; jazz; blues; soul; R&B
- Length: 41:15
- Language: French
- Label: Play On; Jo & Co; Parlophone
- Producer: Ilan Abou; Dominique Blanc-Francard; Thierry Faure; Jean-Jacques Goldman; Sylvain Lux; Kerredine Soltani; Martin Terefe; Frédéric Volovitch

Zaz chronology
| Zaz (2010) | Recto Verso (2013) | Paris (2014) |

Singles from Zaz
- 1. "On ira" Released: 11 March 2013; 2. "Si" Released: 14 October 2013; 3. "Gamine" Released: 24 March 2014

Recto Verso is the second studio album by French singer Zaz, released on 10 May 2013 by Play On, Jo & Co and Parlophone. It peaked at number two on the French Album Chart and spawned three singles, "On ira", "Si" and "Gamine". Musically, it is largely in a similar style to Zaz's eponymou début album. The title refers to the two sides of Zaz's personality, which she wished to express in the music of the album.

== Commercial performance ==
The album was released to iTunes two days in advance of its physical release, which led to it entering the chart at number 35 on the week ending 16 May 2013. The following week, it rose to number two, with total sales of 44,500. The album lost in a well-publicized chart battle to Vanessa Paradis' album Love Songs, which charted at number one with sales of 48,900. The initial performance of Recto Verso was considered disappointing following Zaz, which spent eight weeks at number one. However, Recto Verso went on to spend 10 weeks in the top 10 and was certified Diamond by the Syndicat National de l'Édition Phonographique (SNEP) on 16 July 2014, denoting sales in excess of 500,000 copies in France.

== Singles ==
The first single released from the album was "On ira" (English: "We Will Go"), an uptempo song about the joys of being human. Released to iTunes on 11 March 2013, the song débuted on the French Singles Chart at number 111 during the week ending 23 March 2013. It slowly climbed the charts, peaking at number 12 on 25 May 2013. It became her highest-charting single to date and first top 20. It was similarly successful in multiple other European countries, including Germany, Switzerland and Austria, where it was her first single to chart since "Je veux" in 2010.

The second single from the album was initially chosen to be "Comme ci, comme ça" and in September 2013, a music video for the song was released. However, the choice was changed to "Si" in October 2013 and a music video for that song was released in the same month, accompanied by a digital release on iTunes. On 20 October 2013, the song reached number 34 on the French Singles Chart, tying with "Je veux" as Zaz's second highest-peaking single.

== Track listing ==
| No. | Title | Lyrics | Music | Producer(s) | Length |
|---|---|---|---|---|---|
| 1. | "On ira" | Kerredine Soltani; Olivier Volovitch; Louise Becue | Soltani; Tryss | Soltani | 3:00 |
| 2. | "Comme ci, comme ça" | Isabelle Geffroy; Maya Barsony; Thierry Faure; Ilan Abou | Faure; Abou | Abou; Faure | 2:45 |
| 3. | "Gamine" | Mickaël Furnon | Furnon | Abou; Sylvain Lux | 3:10 |
| 4. | "T'attends quoi" | Soltani; O. Volovitch; Becue | Soltani; Tryss | Soltani | 3:20 |
| 5. | "La Lessive" | Frédéric Volovitch; Geffroy | F. Volovitch | Dominique Blanc-Francard | 2:17 |
| 6. | "J'ai tant escamoté" | Mickey Morisset | Xavier Prêtre | Abou; Faure | 3:44 |
| 7. | "Déterre" | Buridane | Buridane | Martin Terefe | 2:41 |
| 8. | "Toujours" | F. Volovitch | F. Volovitch | Blanc-Francard | 3:11 |
| 9. | "Si je perds" | Aurélie Antolini; F. Volovitch | F. Volovitch | Blanc-Francard | 3:04 |
| 10. | "Si" | Jean-Jacques Goldman | Goldman | Goldman | 2:36 |
| 11. | "Oublie Loulou" | Charles Aznavour | Pierre Roche | Abou; Lux | 2:40 |
| 12. | "Cette journée" | F. Volovitch | F. Volovitch; Terefe; Geffroy | Terefe | 2:53 |
| 13. | "Nous debout" | David McNeil; Ours | Ours | Blanc-Francard | 3:13 |
| 14. | "La Lune" | Morisset | Prêtre | Terefe | 2:41 |
| Total length: | | | | | 41:15 |

Deluxe edition bonus tracks
| No. | Title | Lyrics | Music | Producer(s) | Length |
|---|---|---|---|---|---|
| 15. | "La part d'ombre" | Grand Corps Malade | Geffroy; Abou; Guillaume Juhel | Abou; Lux | 3:54 |
| 16. | "Le Retour du soleil" | Frédéric Zeitoun | Geffroy; Terefe; Alex Cuba | Terefe | 4:27 |
| 17. | "Laissez-moi" | Pauline Vuarin | Vuarin | Abou; Faure | 2:39 |
| Total length: | | | | | 52:16 |

Collector's edition bonus tracks
| No. | Title | Writer(s) | Producer(s) | Length |
|---|---|---|---|---|
| 15. | "Ensemble" | Grand Corps Malade; Geffroy; Abou; Juhel | Abou; Lux | 3:52 |
| 16. | "Je rentre" | F. Volovitch; Geffroy | Blanc-Francard | 5:08 |
| 17. | "La Part d'ombre" | Grand Corps Malade; Geffroy; Abou; Juhel | Abou; Lux | 3:54 |
| 18. | "Le Retour du soleil" | Zeitoun; Geffroy; Terefe; Cuba | Terefe | 4:27 |
| 19. | "Laissez-moi" | Vuarin | Abou; Faure | 2:39 |
| 20. | "En rêve" | Tristan Solanilla; Geffroy; Soltani | Terefe | 2:39 |
| 21. | "Appât de velours" (duet with Alex Renart) | Renart | Xavier Plèche; Alban Sautour | 3:44 |
| 22. | "La Vie en rose" | Édith Piaf | Abou; Faure | 3:51 |
| 23. | "Belle" (taken from the Belle and Sebastian soundtrack) | Cécile Aubry; Daniel White | | 2:55 |
| Total length: | | | | 74:21 |

== Charts ==
=== Weekly charts ===
2013 weekly chart performance for Recto Verso
| Chart (2013) | Peak position |
|---|---|
| Austrian Albums (Ö3 Austria) | 4 |
| Belgian Albums (Ultratop Flanders) | 16 |
| Belgian Albums (Ultratop Wallonia) | 3 |
| Canadian Albums (Billboard) | 16 |
| Czech Albums (ČNS IFPI) | 1 |
| Dutch Albums (Album Top 100) | 73 |
| French Albums (SNEP) | 2 |
| German Albums (Offizielle Top 100) | 2 |
| Greek Albums (IFPI) | 18 |
| Italian Albums (FIMI) | 74 |
| Japanese Albums (Oricon) | 91 |
| Polish Albums (ZPAV) | 5 |
| Spanish Albums (Promusicae) | 21 |
| Swiss Albums (Schweizer Hitparade) | 1 |

2024 weekly chart performance for Recto Verso
| Chart (2024) | Peak position |
|---|---|
| Hungarian Physical Albums (MAHASZ) | 36 |

=== Year-end charts ===
2013 year-end chart performance for Recto Verso
| Chart (2013) | Position |
|---|---|
| Belgian Albums (Ultratop Flanders) | 72 |
| Belgian Albums (Ultratop Wallonia) | 13 |
| French Albums (SNEP) | 6 |
| German Albums (Offizielle Top 100) | 37 |
| Swiss Albums (Schweizer Hitparade) | 9 |

2014 year-end chart performance for Recto Verso
| Chart (2014) | Position |
|---|---|
| Belgian Albums (Ultratop Flanders) | 191 |
| Belgian Albums (Ultratop Wallonia) | 56 |
| French Albums (SNEP) | 27 |
| Swiss Albums (Schweizer Hitparade) | 97 |

== Certifications ==
Certifications for Recto Verso
| Region | Certification | Certified units/sales |
|---|---|---|
| Austria (IFPI Austria) | Gold | 7,500^{*} |
| Belgium (BRMA) | Gold | 15,000^{*} |
| France (SNEP) | Diamond | 500,000^{*} |
| Germany (BVMI) | Gold | 100,000^{^} |
| Poland (ZPAV) | Platinum | 20,000^{‡} |
| Switzerland (IFPI Switzerland) | Platinum | 20,000^{^} |
^{*} Sales figures based on certification alone.^{^} Shipments figures based on certification alone.^{‡} Sales+streaming figures based on certification alone.
