= Je veux =

Single by Zaz

from the album Zaz
- Released: May 10, 2010
- Genre: gypsy jazz
- Length: 3:37
- Label: Play On (Sony Music)
- Songwriter(s): Kerredine Soltani, Tryss
- Producer(s): Kerredine Soltani, Alban Sautour

Zaz singles chronology
"Je veux" (2010)	"Le Long de la route" (2010)

Music video
- "Je veux" on YouTube

"Je veux" (French: [ʒə vø]; "I want") is a song by French singer Zaz from her debut studio album Zaz (2010). The song also became her debut single.

== Writing and composition ==
The song was written by Kerredine Soltani and Tryss. The recording was produced by Kerredine Soltani and Alban Sautour

== Track listing ==
Promo digital single (2010) – Play On (Sony)

1. "Je veux" (3:37)

CD single (2011) – Play On (Sony)

1. "Je veux" (3:38)
2. "Je veux" (Live & Unplugged) (3:47)

== Charts ==
=== Weekly charts ===
Chart (2012)	Peak position
Austria (Ö3 Austria Top 40)	16
Belgium (Ultratop 50 Flanders)	34
Belgium (Ultratop 50 Wallonia)	2
Belgium (Ultratop Airplay Wallonia)	1
France (SNEP)	34
Germany (GfK)	22
Italy (FIMI)	16
Switzerland (Schweizer Hitparade)	23
Chart (2012)	Peak position
Belgium (Ultratop Back Catalogue Singles Flanders)	14
Belgium (Ultratop Back Catalogue Singles Wallonia)	3
Chart (2019)	Peak position
Hungary (Single Top 40)	10

=== Year-end charts ===
Chart (2010)	Peak position
Italy Airplay (EarOne)	79

== Certifications ==
Region	Certification	Certified units/sales
Belgium (BRMA)	Platinum	30,000^{*}
Germany (BVMI)	Gold	150,000^{^}
Italy (FIMI)	Gold	15,000^{*}
Switzerland (IFPI Switzerland)	Platinum	30,000^{^}
^{*} Sales figures based on certification alone.^{^} Shipments figures based on certification alone.
