= Zaz (singer) =

French singer and songwriter

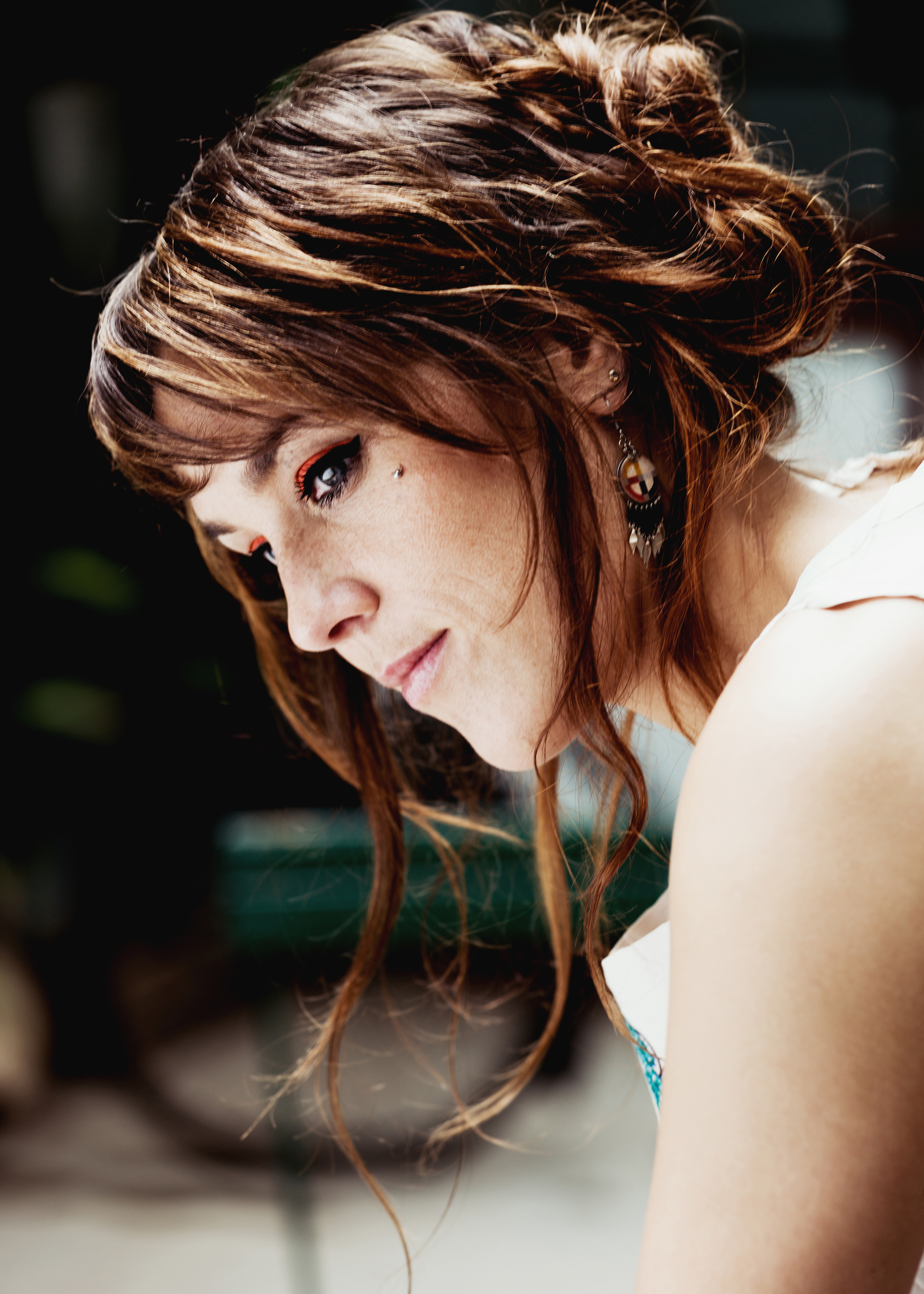
- Zaz in 2014

Background information
- Born: Isabelle Geffroy; 1 May 1980 (age 46)
- Origin: Chambray-lès-Tours, Centre-Val de Loire, France
- Genres: Pop, Jazz, Soul, R&B, Funk
- Occupation: Singer-songwriter
- Years active: 2001–present
- Label: Play On
- Website: www.zazofficial.com

Isabelle Geffroy (French pronunciation: [izabɛl ʒɛfʁwa]; born 1 May 1980), known professionally as Zaz (pronounced [zaz]), is a French singer and songwriter who mixes jazz, French variety, soul and acoustic. She is best known for her single "Je veux", taken from her self-titled debut album, released on 10 May 2010. She has six studio albums: Zaz, Recto verso, Paris, Effet miroir, Isa, and Sains et saufs as well as two live albums: Sans tsu tsou and Sur la route. Worldwide as of February 2023 Zaz has sold over 5 million albums, including 2 million outside France.

== Early life ==
Zaz was born in Tours, France. Her mother was a Spanish teacher, and her father worked for an electric company. In 1985, she entered the Conservatoire de Tours with her sister and her brother, attending courses from the ages of 6 to 11. She studied music theory, specifically the violin, piano, guitar, and choral singing. In 1994, she moved to the Bordeaux region. In 1995, she took singing lessons and played sports for a year in Bordeaux. In 2000, she won a scholarship from the regional council, which allowed her to join a school of modern music, the CIAM (Centre for Musical Activities and Information) of Bordeaux. Her musical influences included 'Four Seasons' by Vivaldi, jazz singers such as Ella Fitzgerald, and other singers such as Enrico Macias, Bobby McFerrin, and Richard Bona, as well as African, Latin, and Cuban rhythms. In 2006, she moved to Paris.

== Career ==
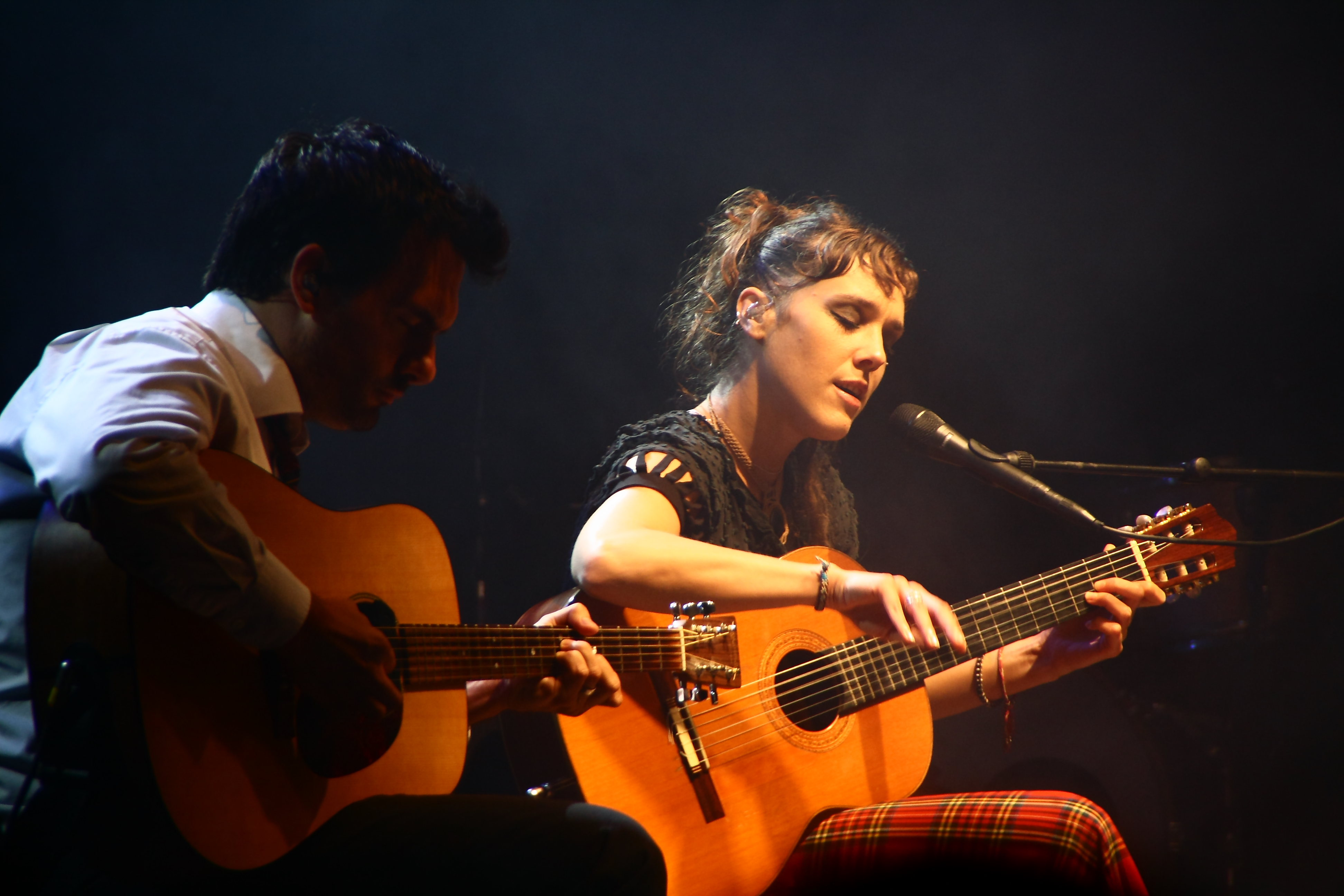
Zaz performing with Benoit Simon at the TFF Rudolstadt festival in 2011

In 2001, she started her singing career in the blues band "Fifty Fingers". She sang in musical groups in Angoulême, especially in a jazz quintet. She became one of the four singers of Izar-Adatz (Basque for "Shooting Star"), a variety band which consisted of sixteen people with whom she toured for two years, especially in the Midi-Pyrenees and the Basque Country. She worked in the studio as a backing singer in Toulouse and performed with many singers, including Maeso, Art Mengo, Vladimir Max, Jean-Pierre Mader, and Serge Guerao.

In 2011, Zaz won an EBBA Award. Every year the European Border Breakers Awards (EBBA) recognize the success of ten emerging artists or groups who reached audiences outside their own countries with their first internationally released album in the past year.

In May 2010, French magazine Télérama announced: "Rumor has swelled in recent weeks: Zaz is an extraordinary voice, and she will be the revelation of the summer!". On 10 May 2010, Zaz released her first album. It contains songs she wrote ("Trop sensible") and co-composed ("Les passants", "Le long de la route", "Prends garde à ta langue", "J'aime à nouveau", "Ni oui ni non"). Kerredine Soltani produced the album on the label "Play On" and wrote and composed the hit single "Je veux". The pop singer Raphaël Haroche wrote her songs "Éblouie par la nuit", "Port Coton" and "La fée". In 2010, she signed a contract for her tours with Caramba and publisher Sony ATV. She was invited to make several television appearances (such as Taratata or Chabada) and was featured in several programs on the radio. On Sunday 6 October 2013, Zaz appeared on BBC One's The Andrew Marr Show in London and sang "Je veux" live.

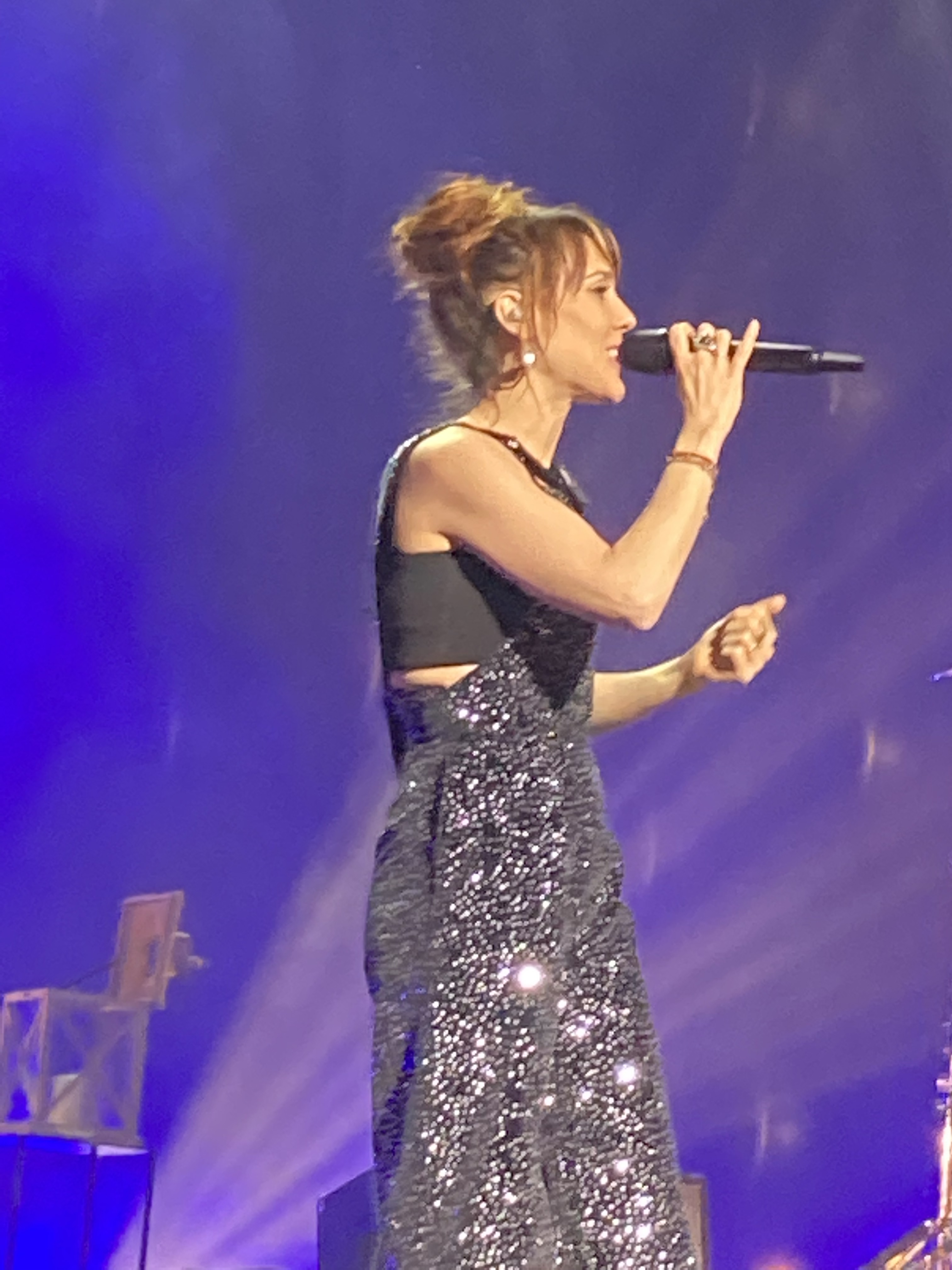
Zaz performing at the Royal Albert Hall, London on 31 March 2022

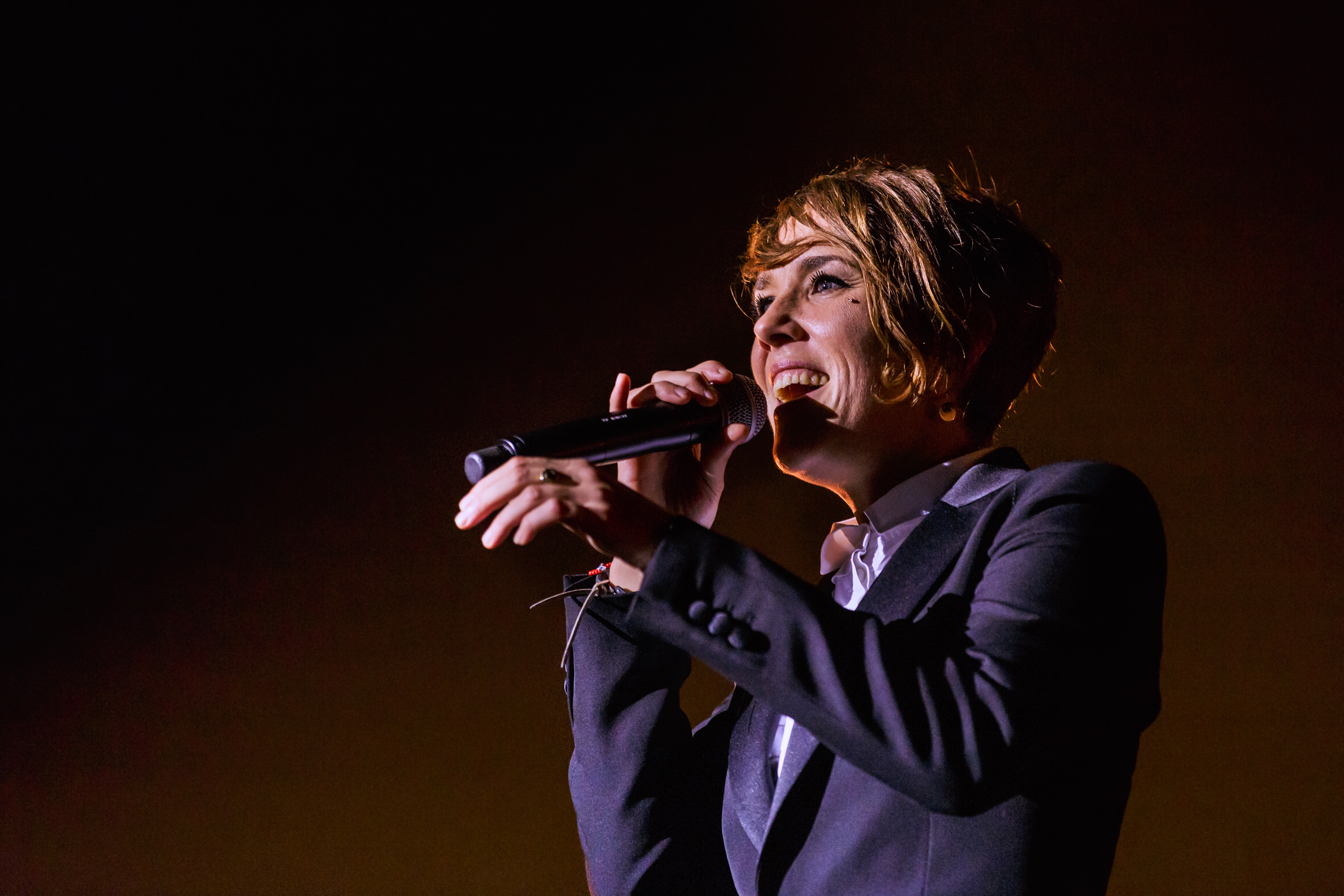
Zaz (Paris Tour) in Brest in 2016.

Zaz then toured France (Paris, La Rochelle, Montauban, Saint-Ouen, Chateauroux, Landerneau, Fécamp...), performed at the Francofolies of Montreal (Canada), and sang in Monthey (Switzerland), Brussels, Berlin, and Milan. In autumn Zaz topped the charts in Belgium, Switzerland, and Austria. Matthieu Baligand, her manager and producer at Caramba Entertainment, explained to Libération: "There's a lot about her right now and people want to see her tour... But despite the demand, it seems preferable for her to begin touring in fifty small places, which will make her more credible. Zaz is a popular, intuitive artist, who is familiar with music, who can sing, but doing a quality show is something else (...)." In November 2010, the debut album Zaz became double platinum and she was awarded "Revelation Song" by the Académie Charles Cros. Zaz also won the European Border Breakers Award: she was named the French artist most played abroad in 2010. According to a survey published by L'Internaute, Zaz was the most popular French singer in the 2010 ranking.

She is also featured on the song "Cœur Volant" for the soundtrack of the 2011 film, Hugo. Her live CD and DVD Zaz live tour Sans Tsu Tsou was revealed.

Her song "Eblouie Par La Nuit" was featured in the 2013 American neo-noir crime thriller, "Dead Man Down".

In 2012, Zaz went on tour and held concerts in various countries around the world including Japan, Canada, Germany, Poland, Switzerland, Slovenia, Czech Republic (Colours of Ostrava), Croatia, Bulgaria, Serbia, and Turkey, among other countries.

With her album Paris she won the 2015 Echo award for best international female rock/pop artist.

In 2016, Zaz was invited to perform in Zacatecas City, Mexico as part of the Festival Cultural Zacatecas.

In September 2018, Zaz released "Qué vendrá", the first track from an upcoming album titled Effet miroir ("Mirror Effect"). The track's title and chorus are in Spanish.

In 2019 Zaz took a career break in order to, "look after myself...There has to be a balance because it's Isa [a contraction of her real name] who feeds Zaz, not Zaz who feeds Isa." In October 2021 Zaz released her fifth studio album, Isa.

In September 2023, Zaz performed Lucienne Delyle's "Mon amant de Saint Jean" at the opening ceremony of the Rugby World Cup in the Stade de France.

== Philanthropy ==
In 2011, Zaz joined the Les Enfoirés charity ensemble.

Zaz created the project Zazimut to "develop and promote projects for a society more respectful of life in all its forms". Since 2017 Zazimut has been one of the joint organisers of the annual Crussol Festival which aims to "raise awareness of building together a more sustainable, happy and supportive society."

== Awards and nominations ==
Year	Awards	Work	Category	Result	Ref.
2014	World Music Awards	Herself	World's Best Female Artist	Nominated	
2014	World Music Awards	Herself	World's Best Live Act	Nominated	
2014	World Music Awards	Zaz	World's Best Album	Nominated	
2014	World Music Awards	Recto Verso	World's Best Album	Nominated	
2014	World Music Awards	"Si"	World's Best Song	Nominated	
2014	World Music Awards	"On Ira"	World's Best Song	Nominated	
2014	World Music Awards	"On Ira"	World's Best Video	Nominated	
2014	Žebřík Music Awards	Paris	Best International Album	Nominated	
2015	Žebřík Music Awards	Herself	Best International Live	Nominated	

== Discography ==
=== Studio albums ===
Title	Details	Peak positions										Certifications
Title	Details	FRA	AUT	BEL (FL)	BEL (WA)	CAN	GER	NLD	POL	SPA	SWI	Certifications
Zaz	Released: 10 May 2010; Label: Play On, Sony; Formats: CD, CD+DVD, LP, digital download	1	12	51	1	57	3	56	1	93	10	SNEP: 2× Diamond; BEA: 3× Platinum; BVMI: 2× Platinum; IFPI AUT: Platinum; IFPI SWI: 2× Platinum; ZPAV: 2× Platinum
Recto Verso	Released: 13 May 2013; Label: Play On, Jo & Co, Parlophone; Formats: CD, CD+DVD, LP, digital download	2	4	16	3	16	2	73	5	21	1	SNEP: Diamond; BEA: Gold; BVMI: Gold; IFPI AUT: Gold; IFPI SWI: Platinum; ZPAV: Platinum
Paris	Released: 10 November 2014; Label: Jo & Co, Play On, Warner; Formats: CD, CD+DVD, LP, digital download	2	4	8	2	9	5	54	2	17 (Note: The Spanish edition of Paris peaked at number 58 in Spain.)	3	SNEP: 3× Platinum; BEA: Gold; BVMI: Gold; IFPI AUT: Gold; IFPI SWI: Gold; ZPAV: 2× Platinum
Effet miroir	Released: 16 November 2018; Label: Warner, Play On, Jo & Co; Formats: CD, LP, digital download	5	18	16	9	43	3	63	25	25	5	SNEP: Platinum
Isa	Released: 22 October 2021	2	10	15	4	—	10	—	24	48	5	SNEP: Gold
Sains et saufs	Released: 19 September 2025	3	22	9	2	—	13	—	—	—	5	SNEP: Gold

=== Box sets ===
Title	Details	Peak positions	
Title	Details	FRA	SPA
Recto verso / Zaz	Released: 2 June 2014; Label: Warner; Format: CD	48	—
Coffret 4 albums	Released: 28 June 2019; Label: Warner; Format: CD	—	56
Effet miroir / Recto Verso	Released: 7 August 2020; Label: Warner; Format: CD	—	—
"—" denotes a recording that did not chart or was not released in that territory.

=== Live albums ===
Title	Details	Peak chart positions							Certifications
Title	Details	FRA	BEL (FL)	BEL (WA)	CAN	POL	SPA	SWI	Certifications
Sans tsu tsou: Live Tour	Released: 5 December 2011; Label: Play On, Jo & Co, Parlophone; Formats: CD, CD+DVD	24	—	27	—	17	—	—	SNEP: Gold
Sur la route	Released: 30 October 2015; Label: Warner; Formats: CD+DVD, digital download	4	36	10	48	18	71	9	SNEP: Platinum
"—" denotes a recording that did not chart or was not released in that territory.

=== Singles ===
==== As lead artist ====
Title	Year	Peak chart positions						Certifications	Album
Title	Year	FRA	AUT	BEL (FL)	BEL (WA)	GER	SWI	Certifications	Album
"Je veux"	2010	34	16	34	2	22	23	BEA: Platinum; BVMI: Gold; IFPI SWI: Platinum	Zaz
"Le long de la route"	2010	62	—	— (Note: "Le long de la route" did not enter the Ultratop 50, but peaked at number 32 on the Flemish Ultratip chart.)	16	—	—		Zaz
"La fée"	2011	40	—	— (Note: "La fée" did not enter the Ultratop 50, but peaked at number 18 on the Flemish Ultratip chart.)	7	—	—		Zaz
"Éblouie par la nuit"	2011	13	—	— (Note: "Éblouie par la nuit" did not enter the Ultratop 50, but peaked at number 17 on the Flemish Ultratip chart.)	34	—	—		Zaz
"Cette journée"	2013	—	—	—	— (Note: "Cette journée" did not enter the Ultratop 50, but peaked at number 31 on the Walloon Ultratip chart.)	—	—		Recto Verso
"On ira"	2013	12	74	— (Note: "On ira" did not enter the Ultratop 50, but peaked at number 33 on the Flemish Ultratip chart.)	16	47	15	IFPI SWI: Gold	Recto Verso
"Comme ci, comme ça"	2013	—	—	— (Note: "Comme ci, comme ça" did not enter the Ultratop 50, but peaked at number 26 on the Flemish Ultratip chart.)	— (Note: "Comme ci, comme ça" did not enter the Ultratop 50, but peaked at number six on the Walloon Ultratip chart.)	—	—		Recto Verso
"Si"	2013	34	—	— (Note: "Si" did not enter the Ultratop 50, but peaked at number 36 on the Flemish Ultratip chart.)	— (Note: "Si" did not enter the Ultratop 50, but peaked at number three on the Walloon Ultratip chart.)	—	—		Recto Verso
"Gamine"	2014	169	—	—	— (Note: "Gamine" did not enter the Ultratop 50, but peaked at number seven on the Walloon Ultratip chart.)	—	—		Recto Verso
"Paris sera toujours Paris"	2014	48	—	— (Note: "Paris sera toujours Paris" did not enter the Ultratop 50, but peaked at number 27 on the Flemish Ultratip chart.)	— (Note: "Paris sera toujours Paris" did not enter the Ultratop 50, but peaked at number 21 on the Walloon Ultratip chart.)	—	—		Paris
"Sous le ciel de Paris"	2014	170	—	— (Note: "Sous le ciel de Paris" did not enter the Ultratop 50, but peaked at number 31 on the Flemish Ultratip chart.)	—	—	—		Paris
"Champs Élysées"	2014	177	—	— (Note: "Champs Élysées" did not enter the Ultratop 50, but peaked at number 18 on the Flemish Ultratip chart.)	— (Note: "Champs Élysées" did not enter the Ultratop 50, but peaked at number 22 on the Walloon Ultratip chart.)	—	—		Paris
"Si jamais j'oublie"	2015	11	—	— (Note: "Si jamais j'oublie" did not enter the Ultratop 50, but peaked at number three on the Flemish Ultratip chart.)	27	—	43		Sur la route
"Tous les cris les S.O.S."	2015	16	—	—	— (Note: "Tous les cris les S.O.S." did not enter the Ultratop 50, but peaked at number 23 on the Walloon Ultratip chart.)	—	—		Balavoine(s)
"Qué vendrá"	2018	—	—	— (Note: "Qué vendrá" did not enter the Ultratop 50, but peaked at number eight on the Flemish Ultratip chart.)	— (Note: "Qué vendrá" did not enter the Ultratop 50, but peaked at number 10 on the Walloon Ultratip chart.)	—	—		Effet miroir
"Demain c'est toi"	2018	—	—	— (Note: "Demain c'est toi" did not enter the Ultratop 50, but peaked at number 31 on the Flemish Ultratip chart.)	—	—	—		Effet miroir
"Nos vies"	2019	—	—	— (Note: "Nos vies" did not enter the Ultratop 50, but peaked at number 18 on the Flemish Ultratip chart.)	— (Note: "Nos vies" did not enter the Ultratop 50, but peaked at number 22 on the Walloon Ultratip chart.)	—	—		Effet miroir
"On s'en remet jamais"	2019	—	—	— (Note: "On s'en remet jamais" did not enter the Ultratop 50, but peaked at number 45 on the Flemish Ultratip chart.)	—	—	—		Effet miroir
"—" denotes a recording that did not chart or was not released in that territory.

==== As featured artist ====
Title	Year	Peak positions		Album
Title	Year	FRA	BEL Tip (WA)	Album
"L'hymne de nos campagnes 2019" Tryo featuring Bigflo & Oli, Claudio Capéo, Gauvain Sers, Sylvain Duthu, L.E.J, Vianney and Zaz)	2019	183	8	XXV
"Ce n'est rien " (Julien Clerc avec Zaz))	2019	—	—	Duos
"I Dare You (Appelle ton amour)" (Kelly Clarkson featuring Zaz)	2020	—	26	Non-album single
"Le jardin des larmes" (Till Lindemann featuring Zaz)	2021	—	—	Isa
"Liebe Ist" (Namika x Zaz)	2023	—	—	Non-album single
"—" denotes a recording that did not chart or was not released in that territory.

==== Charity singles ====
- 2014: "Le chemin de pierre (version pop)" (with Nolwenn Leroy, Thomas Dutronc...)

=== Other charted songs ===
Title	Year	Peak positions		Album
Title	Year	FRA	BEL (WA)	Album
"Trop sensible"	2013	52	—	Zaz
"Belle"	2013	119	—	None
"Demain de bon matin" (Boulevard des airs featuring Zaz)	2016	—	43	Bruxelles
"—" denotes a recording that did not chart or was not released in that territory.
