= Tout Le Bonheur du Monde =

"Tout Le Bonheur Du Monde"

Single by Sinsemilia

from the album Debout, Les Yeux Ouverts
- Released: January 4, 2005
- Genre: Reggae
- Length: 3:14
- Label: Sony Music Entertainment France

"Tout Le Bonheur du Monde" is a single by the French reggae group, Sinsemilia, from their album Debout, Les Yeux Ouverts. The song was the first major success for the group. The music video features two animated characters exploring their world and eventually falling in love.

== Charts ==
=== Weekly charts ===
Chart (2005)	Peak position
Belgium (Ultratop 50 Wallonia)	2
France (SNEP)	4
Switzerland (Schweizer Hitparade)	28

=== Year-end charts ===
Chart (2005)	Position
Belgium (Ultratop Wallonia)	4
Switzerland (Schweizer Hitparade)	80
