= Boulevard des Airs =

French pop/rock group

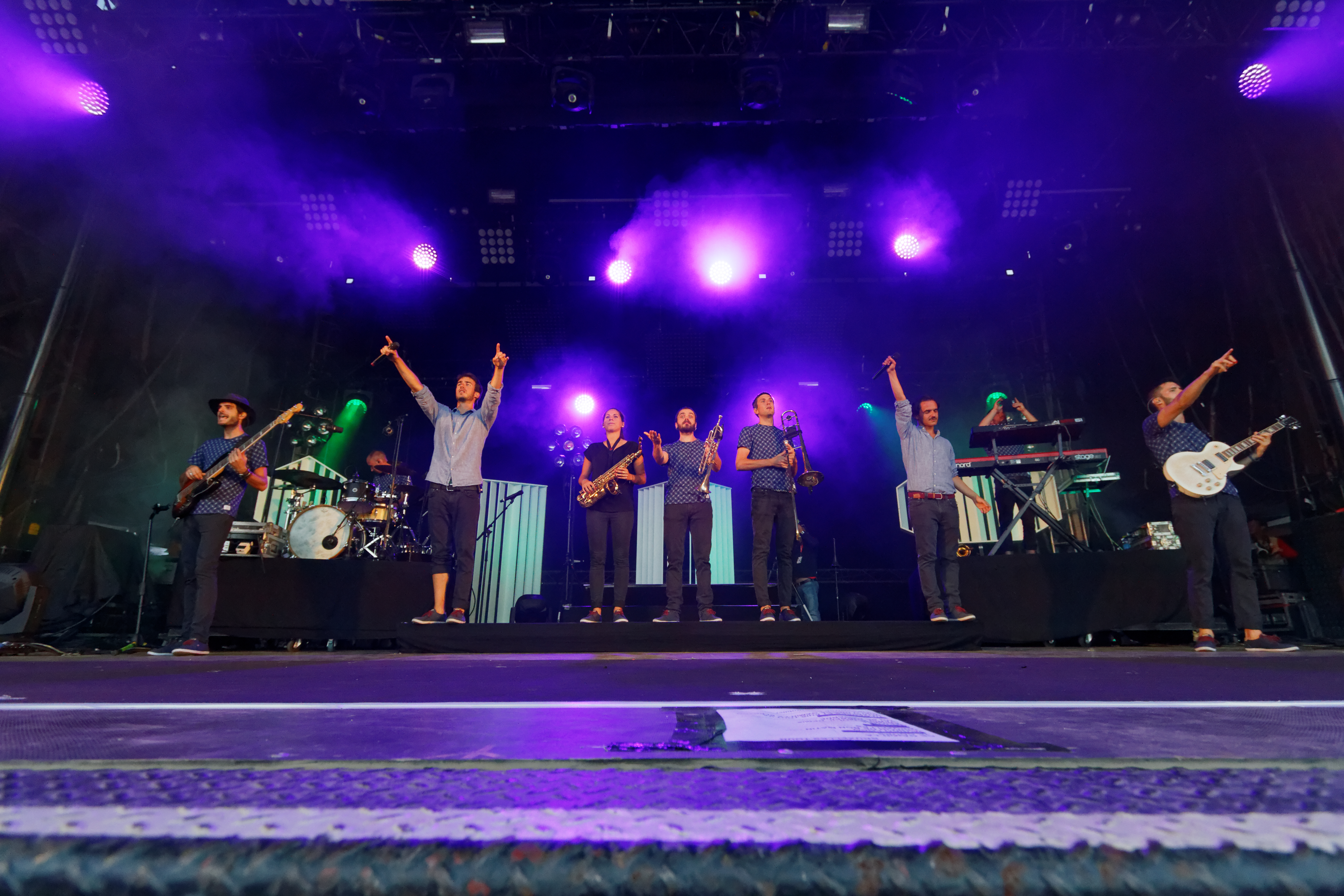
- Boulevard des Airs performing in France in 2016

Background information
- Origin: Tarbes, France
- Genres: Pop; rock
- Years active: 2004–present
- Label: Sony Music
- Members: Florent Dasque; Jean-Noël Dasque; Jean-Baptiste Labe; Laurent Garnier; Jérémie Plante; Eyal; Manu Aurousset; Chacha Angela
- Past members: Pierre-Emmanuel Aurousset; Sylvain Duthu; Ernst Carree; Mélissa Doya
- Website: bda-boulevarddesairs.com

Boulevard des Airs (Note: (French pronunciation: [bulvaʁ dez‿ɛʁ]), generally abbreviared as BdA or BDA) are a French pop/rock group formed in 2004. So far they have published six albums: Paris-Buenos Aires (2011), Les Appareuses trompences (2013), Bruxelles (2015), Je me dis que toi aussi (2018), Loin Des Yeux (2021), and Je rentre à la maison (2025).

== History ==
=== Early years (2004–2012) ===
Boulevard des Airs was formed in 2004 at the Marie-Curie high school in Tarbes in the Hautes-Pyrénées department on the initiative of two friends, Florent Dasque and Sylvain Duthu. The group signed with Sony Music in June 2011. On July 17, 2011, they released the single "Cielo Ciego". Their first album, Paris-Buenos Aires, was released on October 17, 2011, and was certified gold. They embarked on a tour of approximately one hundred dates in France, Spain, Switzerland, Belgium, and Canada. In 2013, they also opened for the group Tryo on their arena tour and at Paris-Bercy.

=== Boulevard des Airs early albums (2013–2017) ===
On January 8, 2013, the group was nominated in the "Newcomer of the Year" category at the Victoires de la Musique awards. On May 13, 2013, their second album, Les Appareuses Trompences, was released. They promoted their new album with a nearly two-year tour in France and other European countries. The group's third album, Bruxelles, was released on June 1, 2015. Upon its release, it reached the top 10 best-selling albums in France. The album was certified gold and then platinum a few months later. The group was invited to the summit of the Pic du Midi de Bigorre in the Pyrenees to give an exceptional concert, becoming the first group to play at this location. The group then embarked on an international tour, the Brussels Tour, in Europe and South America. This also gave the group the opportunity to experience its first tour of the Zénith venues in France. On February 16 , 2017, Sylvain Duthu and Florent Dasque were the sponsors of the final of the 7th Georges Moustaki Prize, in Paris, won by Léopoldine HH, whom they subsequently took as the opening act for their concert at the Halle Tony Garnier in Lyon.

=== Je me dis que toi aussi (2018–2020) ===
On August 31 , 2018, the album Je me dis que toi aussi was released, ranking among the top three best-selling albums in the country upon its release. It went platinum shortly after, becoming the group's third platinum record across three different albums. This album features a duet, "Allez reste," with Vianney. The group subsequently announced a new tour of the Zénith venues. On January 10, 2019, the group was nominated for the second time at the Victoires de la Musique awards in the "original song" category with their song "Je me dis que toi aussi". On February 8, 2019, at the 34th Victoires de la Musique awards ceremony, the group won the trophy for "Original Song" of the year, beating Damso, Orelsan, Louane, Julien Doré, and Aya Nakamura. On June 22, they were invited, along with Vianney, to participate in Patrick Bruel's major concert at the Nancy Amphitheater, followed by another at the Paris La Défense Arena. In July 2019, Allez reste reached number 1 in French radio for 9 weeks, ahead of Angèle; the group also announced a symphonic version of the song. On October 1 , 2019, NRJ announced the group's nomination for the NRJ Music Awards 2019. On October 29 , 2019, the group announced the release of a deluxe version including unreleased tracks, acoustic versions, a symphonic version of their hit "Allez reste ," as well as a duet with Patrick Bruel. This track, written and composed by some members of the group, was performed at the major concert at Paris La Défense Arena on December 7, 2019, broadcast live on TF1, and was accompanied by a music video. On December 11 , 2019, the group was nominated in the "Show of the Year" category at the 2019 Olympia Awards, alongside Clara Luciani, Dadju, Roméo Elvis and Claudio Capéo. On December 13, 2019, the media announced that the group would be the author and composer of the Enfoirés 2020 song and would donate its copyright to the charity Les Restos du cœur. On January 13, 2020, the press announced the group's third nomination at the 2020 Victoires de la Musique awards. For the second consecutive year, after winning the trophy in 2019, they were nominated in the Song of the Year category. On June 5, 2020, the group voluntarily participated in the first Drive In concert in France in Albi.

=== Loin des yeux and hiatus (2020–2023) ===
On June 16 , 2020, the group announced the release of a new album, Loin des yeux, conceived during lockdown, with the first single being Emmène-moi, a duet with LEJ. The album featured numerous collaborations with artists, including Tryo, Patrick Bruel, Yannick Noah, Vianney, and Claudio Capéo, as well as 12 unreleased tracks retracing the group's journey. This album was also be released on vinyl. On October 26 , 2020, the press announces the group's nomination for the NRJ Music Awards 2020.

=== Announcement of return (2024–present) ===
In December 2024, the press announced the group's return in early 2025 with a new album and a new tour. In January 2025, "Seul ici" was released as the first single from this new album. This return is marked by the absence of Sylvain Duthu, who is starting a solo project, as well as the arrival of Eyal on vocals, who was previously spotted by the group. The album "Loin des yeux" also went gold, like the three previous albums. Certified by the Syndicat national de l'édition phonographique in May 2025 [ 45 ] New album - New tour "I'm going home" (2025)

In February, a new track, "Seul ici" (Alone Here), was released. It is a song about grieving the end of a relationship, accepting solitude, and finding oneself after a breakup or a death. The group recounts the inner journey that begins when the other person leaves, leaving a void that nothing and no one can fill. The song explores suffering, doubt, and resilience in the face of absence, while refusing to be overwhelmed by grief. This album, like its predecessors, features several duets, notably with Carbonne (singer) and LEJ. On May 23 the group released a new track "Je rentre à la maison". This title will also be the basis for an international educational and cultural project, in collaboration with the Ministries of National Education and Culture, aimed at students and teachers from primary to secondary school, as well as associations fighting against school bullying or school dropout, hostels, and adapted structures, The highlight of this artistic, cultural and educational project will be the invitation sent to young people to come and present their productions on the stages of the group's tour, from the Olympia to the Zénith.

“Je rentre à la maison” was selected as one of the featured songs in Manie Musicale 2026, an international French‑language music competition widely used in schools to promote francophone culture.

== Members ==
- Florent Dasque – vocals, guitar
- Jean-Noël Dasque – guitar
- Jérémie Plante – piano
- Jean-Baptiste Labe – trombone
- Laurent Garnier – bass, keyboards
- Manu Aurousset – trumpet
- Eyal – vocals
- Chacha Angela – drums

=== Former members ===
- Sylvain Duthu – vocals
- Mélissa Doya – vocals, saxophone
- Ernst Carree – drums
- Pierre-Emmanuel Aurousset - trompette

== Discography ==
=== Albums ===
Year	Album	Peak positions			Certification
Year	Album	FR	BEL (Wa)	SWI	Certification
2011	Paris-Buenos Aires	24	–	–	
2013	Les Appareuses trompences	31	–	–	
2015	Bruxelles	10	16	–	
2018	Je me dis que toi aussi	4	8	42	
2021	Loin des yeux	9	22	26	

=== EPs ===
Year	EP	Peak positions		Certification
Year	EP	FR	BEL (Wa)	Certification
2011	Cielo Ciego EP	–	–	

=== Singles ===
Year	Title	Peak positions		Album
Year	Title	FR	BEL (Wa)	Album
2011	"Cielo Ciego"	70	–	Paris-Buenos Aires
2015	"Emmène-moi"	48	Tip	Bruxelles
2015	"Bruxelles"	50	11	Bruxelles
2018	"Je me dis que toi aussi"	101	22	Je me dis que toi aussi
2018	"Allez reste" (featuring Vianney)	69	38	Je me dis que toi aussi
