= Raphaël Haroche =

French musician and actor (born 1975)

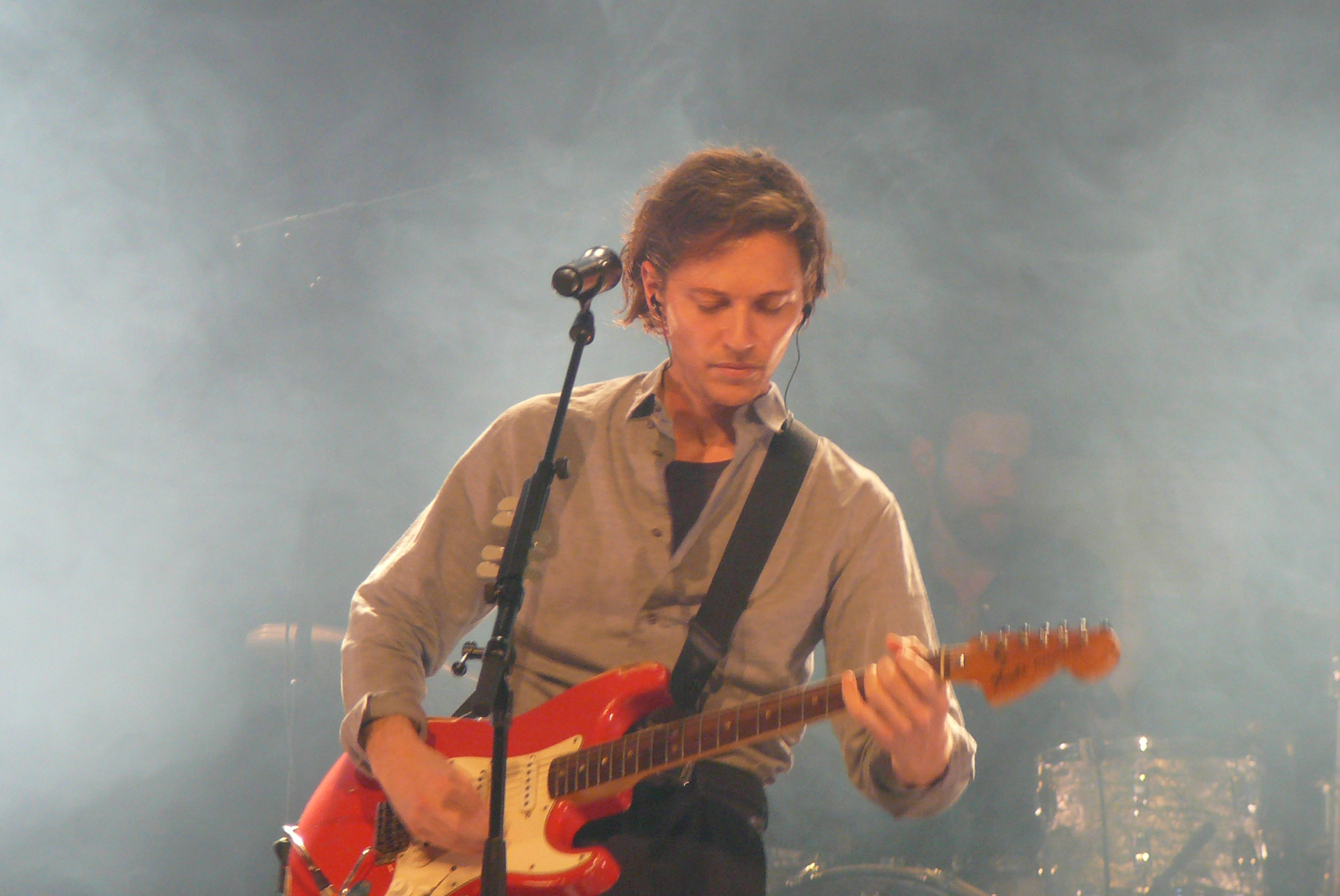
- Raphaël in concert in Brussels in 2017

Background information
- Also known as: Raphael
- Born: Raphaël Haroche; 7 November 1975 (age 51); Paris, France
- Origin: Boulogne-Billancourt, Hauts-de-Seine, France
- Genres: French rock, chanson, pop rock, folk
- Occupations: Singer–songwriter, composer, actor
- Instruments: Vocals, guitar, piano
- Years active: 2000–present
- Label: EMI
- Website: raphael.fm

Raphaël Haroche (born 7 November 1975), professionally known under his mononym Raphael, is a French singer–songwriter and actor.

== Personal and media life ==
Raphael was born as Raphaël Haroche on 7 November 1975 in Paris, France, and was raised in Boulogne-Billancourt, Hauts-de-Seine. His father is of Moroccan and Russian Jewish descent and his mother is Argentinian. One of his paternal uncles is physics Nobel prize laureate Serge Haroche.

During his childhood and his adolescence, Raphael played the piano and the guitar.

In June 2007, Raphael placed ninth on the French Elle magazine "15 Sexiest Man" list. He has been in a relationship with actress Mélanie Thierry, who appeared in the music video for his single "Caravan". On 24 May 2008, Thierry gave birth to the couple's first child, Roman. Their second son, Aliocha, was born in December 2013. Their third son, Isaac, was born in May 2024. The couple married in June 2022.

== Musical career ==
In 2000, Raphael released his first album Hôtel de l'univers (the title is a tribute to Arthur Rimbaud), but it was not until three years later that he enjoyed his first mainstream success with the song Sur la Route, a duo with famous French singer Jean-Louis Aubert, included in his second album La Réalité. With this album, he chose folk music.

In 2005, Raphael released his third album, Caravane, to huge critical acclaim and commercial success. He received three Music's Victories in 2006.

In September 2006, Raphael released the double live album Résistance à la nuit featuring songs from his first three albums as well as a nod to Íngrid Betancourt in the form of the songs La petite chanson and Ceci n'est pas un adieu.

At the beginning of 2007, Raphael became a member of the supergroup Les Aventuriers d'un autre Monde with Jean-Louis Aubert, Alain Bashung, Cali, Daniel Darc, and Richard Kolinka.

In February 2007, Raphael released his live acoustic album Une nuit au Châtelet which is partly a tribute to French singers such as Bernard Lavilliers, Gérard Manset, and Serge Gainsbourg. Amongst the many musicians working on this project was ex-David Bowie pianist Mike Garson.

Raphael's fourth studio album, Je sais que la terre est plate was released on 17 March 2008. This album featured the song Haïti, a collaboration with the Jamaican group Toots & the Maytals.

On 27 September 2010, Raphael released his fifth studio album, Pacific 231.

== Other work ==
In 1999, Raphael made a brief appearance in the comedy film Peut-être (French: Maybe), directed by Cédric Klapisch. He would subsequently had small roles in The Dancer (2000) and the television film Les grand gamins. In 2010, Raphael portrayed the character of Louis in Ces amours-là, directed by Claude Lelouch. The film was premiered in France on 15 September 2011.

== Discography ==
=== Studio albums ===
Year	Album	Charts				Certification
Year	Album	FRA	BEL (WA)	BEL (FL)	SWI	Certification
2000	Hôtel de l'univers: Released: 2000; Label: EMI; Formats: CD, cassette	107	—	—	—	
2003	La réalité: Released: 2003; Label: EMI; Formats: CD, digital download	24	41	—	—	FRA: Platinum
2005	Caravane: Released: 14 March 2005; Label: EMI; Formats: CD, digital download	1	1	—	9	FRA: Diamond
2008	Je sais que la terre est plate: Released: 17 March 2008; Label: EMI; Formats: CD, digital download	1	2	79	3	FRA: Platinum
2010	Pacific 231: Released: 2010; Label: EMI; Formats: CD, digital download	1	1	—	5	FRA: Platinum
2012	Super-welter: Released: 2012; Label: EMI / Capitol Music; Formats: CD, digital download	4	2	122	19	
2015	Somnambules: Released: 2015; Label: Warner Music; Formats: CD, digital download	3	4	150	19	
2017	Anticyclone: Released: 2017; Label: Columbia (Sony); Formats: CD, digital download	14	5	189	14	
2021	Haute fidélité: Released: 2021; Label: Columbia Records; Formats: CD, digital download	12	4	—	10	
2024	Une autre vie: Released: 8 March 2024; Label: Believe; Formats: CD, digital download	—	26	—	—	

=== Live albums ===
Year	Album	Charts			
Year	Album	FRA	BEL (WA)	BEL (FL)	SWI
2006	Resistance à la nuit: Released: 2006; Label: Formats:	3	1	—	26
2007	Une nuit au Châtelet: Released: 2007; Label: Formats:	43	31	—	84
2015	Solitude des latitudes - Raphaël revisite Manset: Released: 2015; Label: Play On (Warner); Formats: CD	198	117	—	—

=== Singles ===
Single	Year	Album	Charts		
Single	Year	Album	FRA	BEL	SWI
"Cela nous aurait suffi"	2001	Hôtel de l'univers	87	—	—
"Sur la route" (feat. Jean-Louis Aubert)	2003	La réalité	29	18	76
"Ô compagnons"	2003	La réalité	76	8	—
"Caravane"	2005	Caravane	4	2	27
"Ne partons pas fâchés"	2005	Caravane	23	16	48
"Et dans 150 ans"	2006	Caravane	15	17	44
"Schengen"	2006	Caravane	39	2	89
"Le vent de l'hiver"	2008	Je sais que la terre est plate	14	26	26
"Adieu Haïti" (feat. Toots Hibbert)	2008	Je sais que la terre est plate	22	27	—
"Le petit train"	2008	Je sais que la terre est plate	—	7	—
"Bar de l'hôtel"	2010	Pacific 231	—	18	—
"Le patriote"	2010	Pacific 231	—	2	—
"La petite misère"	2011	Pacific 231	—	26	—
"Manager"	2012	Super-welter	94	—	—
"Somnambule"	2015	Somnambules	50	—	—

=== As a featured artist ===
Single	Year	Charts		
Single	Year	FRA	BEL	SUI
"Une petite cantante" (with Claire Keim, Bénabar and Jenifer Bartoli)	2009	—	29	—

=== Other charting songs ===
Single	Year	Charts			Album
Single	Year	FRA	BEL	SUI	Album
"Dès que le vent soufflera"	2014	96	—	—	La Bande à Renaud
"Maladie de cœur"	2015	172	—	—	Somnambules

== Filmography ==
Title	Original Title	Year	Role	Notes
Maybe	Peut-être	1999	Singer	
The Dancer	—N/a	2000	Singer	Cameo appearance
The Big Boys	Les grands gamins	2008	Singer	TV film
What War May Bring	Ces amours-là	2010	Louis	Directed by Claude Lelouch

== Awards and nominations ==
Awards	Year	Category	Nominated work	Result
NRJ Music Awards	2006	Male Francophone Artist of the Year	—N/a	Won
Victoires de la Musique	2006	Male Artist of the Year	—N/a	Won
Victoires de la Musique	2006	Album of the Year – Chanson, Variety	Caravane	Won
Victoires de la Musique	2006	Original Song of the Year	"Caravane"	Won

== Notes ==
=== Further reading ===
- Bartillat, Cyril Anthony: Raphaël, une route dans l'univers (2007)
- Bataille, Sébastien: Raphaël de A à Z (2006)
- Joyaux, Véronique: Raphaël, charme et talent (2006)
- Terray, Marie; d'Oliv' par LuK; Piatek, Dorotée; Lhuissier, Basile; Blondelle, Gwendal; Tixier, Julien: Les Chansons de Raphaël en BD (2006)

Preceded by -M-	Victoires de la Musique; Male Group or Artist of the Year; 2006	Succeeded by Bénabar
