= Argoland =

Hypothetical paleocontinent rifted off Australia

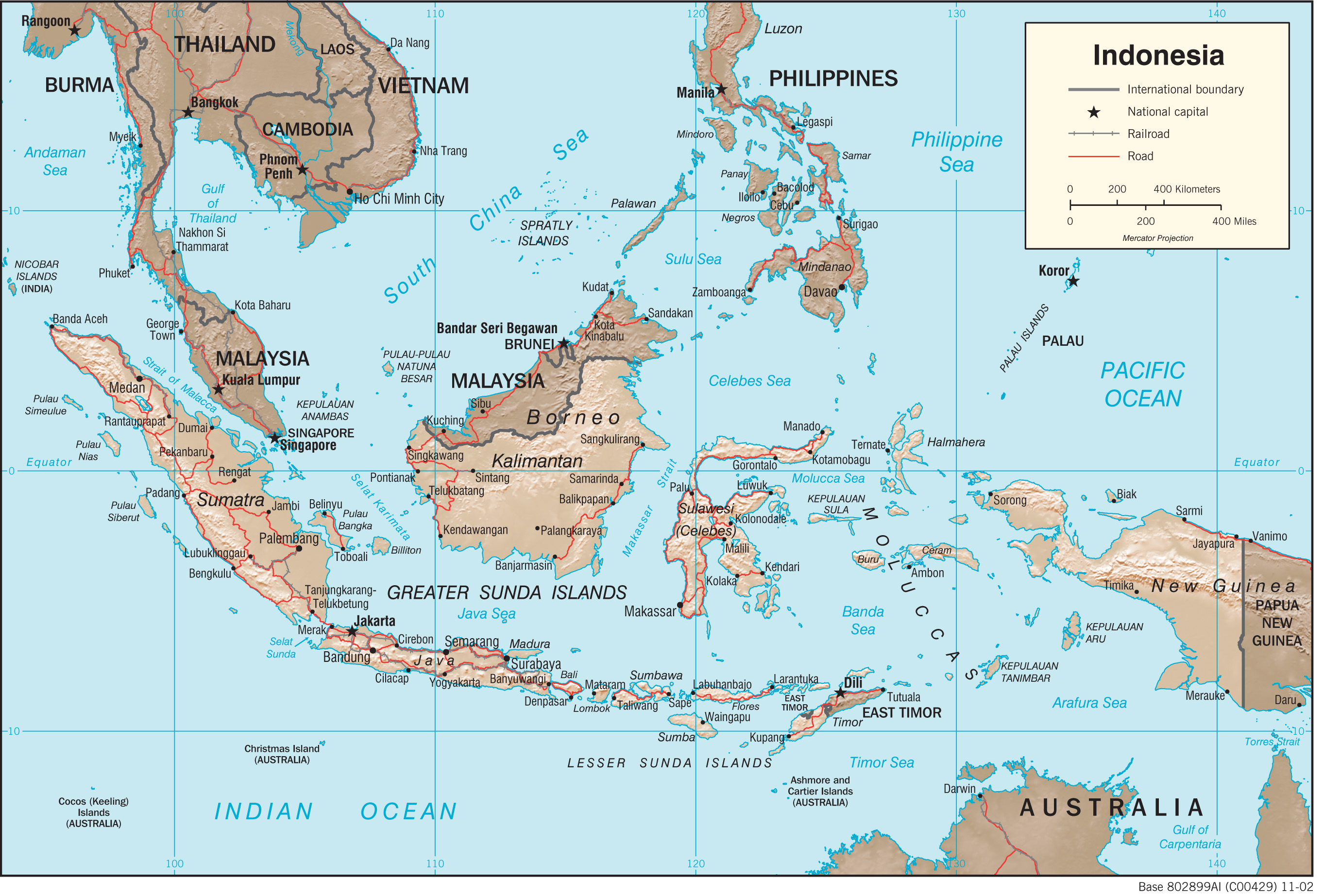
Indonesia

Video showing paleogeographic reconstructions from Advokaat and van Hinsbergen 2024, demonstrating the rifting of the Argoland terranes off of Australia during the Jurassic and its subsequent movement northward and collision with Asia during the Cretaceous and Cenozoic

Argoland is the tentative name of a hypothetical paleocontinent which was suggested to rift off from northwestern Australia some 155 Ma ago (Late Jurassic). The evidence for this was drawn from the existence of the Argo Abyssal Plain northwestwards off Australia. An October 2023 article by Advokaat and van Hinsbergen attempted to reconstruct Argoland, where it is suggested that it was an archipelago rather than a solid continent and currently its Gondwana-derived fragments are southwest Borneo, Greater Paternoster, East Java, South Sulawesi, West Burma block, and Mount Victoria Land block. (Note: Mount Victoria Land block rifted from Gondwana and collided with Burma)

For some time the evolution of Argoland was unknown. Researchers expected to find a submerged continent under the islands of Southeastern Asia, but none were found. There were a number of hypothesis, e.g., suggesting that its remains are East Java-West Sulawesi, or it evolved to West Burma. However these suggestions seemed controversial, since these areas were surrounded by much older remnants, dating up to 205 Ma ago, which would poorly match the current theories of plate tectonics.

Advokaat and van Hinsbergen concluded that the fragmentation of Argoland started around 215Ma ago, long before it split off Australia and it always consisted of separate microcontinental fragments. Advokaat and van Hinsbergen reconstruct that "Argoland originated at the northern Australian margin between the Bird's Head in the east and Wallaby-Zenith fracture zone in the west, south of which it bordered Greater India" and it broke into what they call "Argopelago" during Late Triassic rifting of Lhasa terrane from the Gondwana margin. (Note: At these times (the precursors of) Australia, Lhasa, and India were close by.)
