= Zenit =

Zenit, meaning "zenith", may refer to:

== Spaceflight and rocketry ==
- Zenit (rocket family), a Soviet family of space launch vehicles
- Zenit (satellite), a type of Soviet spy satellite
- Zenit sounding rocket, a Swiss rocket

== Sports ==
- Zenit (sports society), a USSR and Russian sports society
  - FC Zenit Saint Petersburg, football club
  - BC Zenit Saint Petersburg, basketball club
- VC Zenit-Kazan, a volleyball club from Kazan city, Tatarstan, Russia
- FC Zenit (disambiguation), a number of European football clubs
- Zenit Nisko, former name of Sokół Nisko, a Polish football club

== Other uses ==
- Zenit (album), a 2019 album by Austrian rapper RAF Camora
- Zenit (camera), a Russian camera brand produced by KMZ
- Zenit (Saint Petersburg Metro), a station on the Saint Petersburg Metro line 3
- Zenit News Agency, an international news agency covering the Catholic Church
- Zenit (magazine), a Yugoslav art magazine from the 1920s

== People with the given name ==
- Zenit Đozić (born 1961), Bosnian actor, humorist, and television producer

== See also ==
- Zenith (disambiguation)
