= Zenith (disambiguation) =

The zenith is the point in the sky that appears directly above the observer.

Zenith or Zénith may also refer to:

== Automotive ==
- Zenith Carburettor Company (British), a carburetor maker
- Zenith Carburetor Company, an American carburetor company, unrelated to the British firm

== Aviation ==
- Ellipse Zenith, a French hang glider
- Zénith (balloon), flown to a record altitude of more than 8,000 meters in 1875
- Zenith Aircraft Company, a manufacturer of light aircraft

== Business ==
- Zenith Administrators, Inc. and Zenith American Solutions, respectively predecessor and successor companies of American Benefit Plan Administrators
- Zenith Bank, a Nigerian bank
- Zenit (camera), a Russian camera brand produced by KMZ (spelled as Zenith in some English-language literature)
- Zenith Data Systems, computer hardware company
- Zenith Education Group, a subsidiary of Educational Credit Management Corporation which operates colleges in the US
- Zenith Electronics, a radio and television manufacturer
- Zenith Insurance Company, an American insurance company
- Zenith Motorcycles, a now defunct British motorcycle manufacturer
- Zenith (watchmaker), a Swiss watchmaker

== Entertainment ==
- Le Zénith, the common name for a series of indoor arenas, all similar in design, in France (15 at present)
  - Zénith Paris, the first and most famous of the venues
  - Zénith d'Orléans
  - Zénith de Strasbourg
- Zenith (building), a culture and exhibition centre in Munich, Germany
- Zenith, a computer game by Nasir Gebelli
- Zenith Productions, a defunct British independent film and television production company
- Zenith, an NFT by Colombian singer-songwriter Shakira featured on the La Caldera collection

== Fiction ==
- Zenith (film), a 2010 American film
- "The Zenith" (Voltron: Legendary Defender), a 2018 eighth season episode
- Monsieur Zenith, a villain in the Sexton Blake series of detective pulp fiction
- Zenith (comics), a superhero comic series written by Grant Morrison that first appeared in 2000 AD
- Zenith, Winnemac, a city in Sinclair Lewis's fictional state of Winnemac, and the setting for his 1922 novel Babbitt
- Zenith Caste, caste in the role-playing game Exalted
- Zenith Castle, or Zenithia, a sky castle from the Dragon Quest video game series
- Zenith, a book written by Julie Bertagna
- Zenith Carrierzord, a Zord in Power Rangers Lost Galaxy that was formerly the Shark Galactabeast
- Zenith, the home planet of Winx Club member Tecna, the fairy of technology

== Music ==
- Zenith (Grayskul album)
- Zenith (Alfie Arcuri album)
- Zenith (Molly Nilsson album)
- Zenith (Sam Rivers album)
- Zenith (Bleed from Within album)
- "Zenith", a song from Starbound Beast by Huntress
- "Zenith", a song from Decipher by After Forever
- "Zenith", a song from Meliora by Ghost
- "Zenith", a song from Reborn by Kavinsky
- "The Zenith", a song from Silver by Starflyer 59

== Ships ==
- HMS Zenith, the name of various ships of the British Royal Navy and of the Royal Naval Volunteer Reserve Division at Southampton
- MV The Zenith, a cruise ship
- USS Zenith (SP-61), a patrol vessel that served in the US Navy from 1917 to 1918

== Places ==
- Zenith, Georgia, unincorporated community in the US
- Zenith, Illinois, unincorporated community in the US
- Zenith, Kansas, unincorporated community in the US
- Zenith, North Dakota, unincorporated community in the US
- Zenith, Pennsylvania, unincorporated community in the US
- Zenith, Tennessee, unincorporated community
- Zenith, West Virginia, unincorporated community in the US
- Zenith City, nickname of Duluth, Minnesota, US
- Zenith Heights, Michigan, an unincorporated community

== Other uses ==
- Summit, a point on a surface that is higher in elevation than all points immediately adjacent to it
- Zenith (1985 painting), by Jean-Michel Basquiat and Andy Warhol
- Zenith (magazine), a German magazine of Arabic and Islamic studies
- Zénith FC, professional football club based in Cap-Haïtien, Haiti
- Zenith number, also known as Enterprise or WX, referring to a toll-free telephone service
- Zenith camera, an astronomic or geodetic instrument which is directed exactly to the zenith
- Zenith Plateau, or Zenith Seamount, an undersea bathymetric high beneath the Indian Ocean
- Zenith Go, or Zen, computer Go program
- Zenith Jones Brown (1898–1983), an American crime fiction writer
- Zenith, a weapon from the game Terraria

== See also ==
- Zenit (disambiguation)
- Xenith, a Marvel Comics character and member of the Imperial Guard
