= The Wörld Is Yours Tour =

2011–12 concert tour by Motörhead

- Tour by Motörhead
- Associated album: The Wörld Is Yours
- Start date: 25 January 2011
- End date: 24 June 2012
- Legs: 4 in North America; 4 in Europe; 2 in South America; 1 in Oceania; 11 total
- No. of shows: 60 in Europe; 60 in North America; 10 in South America; 4 in Oceania; 134 played

Motörhead concert chronology
- 35th Anniversary Tour (2010); The Wörld Is Yours Tour (2011–2012); Mayhem Festival 2012

The Wörld Is Yours Tour was a tour performed by the heavy metal band Motörhead in support of their album, The Wörld Is Yours. During the tour Motörhead took part in opening for the Foo Fighters and Judas Priest, during their Wasting Light Tour and Epitaph World Tour respectively. During the tour, the band would take part Gigantour, the heavy metal music festival organized by Megadeth's Dave Mustaine.

Former Guns 'N' Roses bassist Duff McKagan spoke highly of supporting the band in Germany with his band Loaded, saying that: "If you are a rock band of Loaded‘s size and ilk, playing Germany with Motörhead is like making it to The Show when you get called up to the major leagues in baseball. We have been “called up,” and even my wife and daughters from afar revere the great Lemmy, Phil Campbell and Mikkey Dee.

== Personnel ==
- Lemmy Kilmister – bass guitar, lead vocals
- Phil Campbell – guitar
- Mikkey Dee – drums

== Setlists ==
First setlist (Legs 1–7)

1. "We Are Motörhead" (Replaced by "Iron Fist" on Leg 2)
2. "Stay Clean"
3. "Metropolis"
4. "Get Back in Line"
5. "Over the Top"
6. One Night Stand
7. "Rock Out"
8. Guitar Solo
9. "The Thousand Names of God"
10. "I Got Mine" (Dropped on Leg 3)
11. "I Know How to Die"
12. "The Chase Is Better Than the Catch"
13. "In the Name of Tragedy" (with drum solo)
14. "Going to Brazil"
15. "Just 'Cos You Got the Power"
16. "Killed by Death"
17. "Ace of Spades"

Encore:

18. "Overkill"

Second setlist (Leg 8)

1. "Bomber"
2. "Damage Case"
3. "I Know How to Die"
4. "Stay Clean"
5. "Metropolis"
6. "Over the Top"
7. "One Night Stand"
8. Guitar Solo
9. "The Chase Is Better Than the Catch""
10. "Get Back in Line"
11. "Rock Out"
12. "The One to Sing the Blues" (With drum solo)
13. "Orgasmatron"
14. "Going to Brazil"
15. "Killed by Death"
16. "Iron Fist"

Encore:

17. "Whorehouse Blues"
18. "Ace of Spades"
19. "Overkill"

Gigantour Setlist

1. "Bomber"
2. "Damage Case"
3. "I Know How to Die"
4. "Stay Clean"
5. "Over the Top"
6. "The Chase Is Better Than the Catch"
7. "The One to Sing the Blues" (with drum solo)
8. "Going to Brazil"
9. "Killed by Death"
10. "Ace of Spades"
11. "Overkill"

== Tour dates ==
Date	City	Country	Venue	Support Act(s)
Leg 1 – North America
25 January 2011	Anaheim	United States	House of Blues	Valient Thorr
28 January 2011	Reno	United States	Knitting Factory	Valient Thorr
29 January 2011	Las Vegas	United States	House of Blues	Clutch; Valient Thorr
31 January 2011	San Diego	United States	House of Blues	Clutch; Valient Thorr
2 February 2011	San Francisco	United States	Warfield Theatre	Clutch; Valient Thorr
4 February 2011	Seattle	United States	The Showbox	Clutch; Valient Thorr
5 February 2011	Portland	United States	Roseland Theater	Clutch; Valient Thorr
7 February 2011	Vancouver	Canada	Vogue Theatre	Clutch; Valient Thorr
9 February 2011	Edmonton	Canada	EEC	Clutch; Valient Thorr
10 February 2011	Calgary	Canada	Flames Central	Clutch; Valient Thorr
12 February 2011	Winnipeg	Canada	Burton Cummings Theatre	Clutch; Valient Thorr
13 February 2011	Fargo	United States	The Venue	Clutch; Valient Thorr
15 February 2011	Minneapolis	United States	First Avenue	Clutch; Valient Thorr
16 February 2011	Milwaukee	United States	The Rave	Clutch; Valient Thorr
17 February 2011	Kansas City	United States	Midland Theatre	Clutch; Valient Thorr
19 February 2011	Chicago	United States	Congress Theater	Clutch; Valient Thorr
20 February 2011	St. Louis	United States	Pops	Clutch; Valient Thorr
22 February 2011	Grand Rapids	United States	The Orbit Room	Clutch; Valient Thorr
23 February 2011	Royal Oak	United States	Royal Oak Music Theatre	Clutch; Valient Thorr
25 February 2011	Kitchener	Canada	Elements Night Club	Clutch; Valient Thorr
26 February 2011	Toronto	Canada	Kool Haus	Clutch; Valient Thorr
28 February 2011	New York City	United States	PlayStation Theater	Clutch; Valient Thorr
1 March 2011	Boston	United States	House of Blues	Clutch; Valient Thorr
3 March 2011	Sayreville	United States	Starland Ballroom	Clutch; Valient Thorr
4 March 2011	Atlantic City	United States	House of Blues	Clutch; Valient Thorr
5 March 2011	Charlotte	United States	The Fillmore	Clutch; Valient Thorr
8 March 2011	Austin	United States	Stubb's BBQ	Clutch; Valient Thorr
10 March 2011	Tempe	United States	Marquee Theatre	Clutch; Valient Thorr
11 March 2011	Los Angeles	United States	Club Nokia L.A. Live	Clutch; Valient Thorr
Leg 2 – Australia
26 March 2011	Melbourne	Australia	Festival Hall	Regular John
28 March 2011	Sydney	Australia	Big Top	Regular John
30 March 2011	Torrensville	Australia	Thebarton Theatre	Regular John
1 April 2011	Gold Coast	Australia	Gold Coast Convention and Exhibition Centre	Regular John
Leg 3 – South America
6 April 2011	San José	Costa Rica	Estadio Ricardo Saprissa Aymá	—
9 April 2011	Santiago	Chile	Teatro Caupolicán (Big Metal Fest)	—
12 April 2011	Buenos Aires	Argentina	Estadio Luna Park	—
14 April 2011	Montevideo	Uruguay	Ramón Collazo Summer Theater	—
16 April 2011	São Paulo	Brazil	Via Funchal	—
17 April 2011	Curitiba	Brazil	Master Hall	—
20 April 2011	Florianópolis	Brazil	Floripa Music Hall	—
22 April 2011	Brasília	Brazil	Nilson Nelson Gymnasium	—
26 April 2011	Lima	Peru	Estadio Monumental "U"	—
Leg 3 – North America
17 May 2011	Tulsa	United States	BOK Center	Support act for: Foo Fighters
18 May 2011	North Little Rock	United States	Simmons Bank Arena	Support act for: Foo Fighters
20 May 2011	Memphis	United States	FedExForum	Support act for: Foo Fighters
21 May 2011	Gulf Shores	United States	The Hangout (Hangout Music Festival)	—
23 May 2011	Council Bluffs	United States	Mid-America Center	Support act for: Foo Fighters
26 May 2011	Missoula	United States	Adams Center	Support act for: Foo Fighters
Leg 4 – Europe
11 June 2011	Münster	Germany	Am Hawerkamp (Vainstream Rockfest)	—
13 June 2011	Nickelsdorf	Austria	Pannonia Fields II (Nova Rock Festival)	—
17 June 2011	Weismain	Germany	Waldstadion (Rock in Concert)	—
25 June 2011	Imola	Italy	Autodromo Enzo e Dino Ferrari (Sonisphere Festival)	—
1 July 2011	Hérouville-Saint-Clair	France	Château de Beauregard (Beauregard Festival)	—
2 July 2011	Belfort	France	Lac de Malsaucy (Eurockéennes)	—
10 July 2011	Knebworth	England	Knebworth House (Sonisphere Festival)	—
16 July 2011	Istanbul	Turkey	Istanbul Hezarfen Airfield (Rock'n Coke)	—
Leg 5 – North America
23 July 2011	Toronto	Canada	Downsview Park (Heavy T.O.)	—
24 July 2011	Montreal	Canada	Parc Jean-Drapeau (Heavy Montréal)	—
Leg 6 – Europe
29 July 2011	A Coruña	Spain	Coliseum da Coruña	Support act for: Judas Priest
30 July 2011	Leganés	Spain	La Cubierta	Support act for: Judas Priest
31 July 2011	Bilbao	Spain	Bizkaia Arena	Support act for: Judas Priest
2 August 2011	Badalona	Spain	Palau Municipal d'Esports de Badalona	Support act for: Judas Priest
4 August 2011	Avenches	Switzerland	Arènes (Rock Oz'Arènes)	—
6 August 2011	Wacken	Germany	Wacken Open Air	—
10 August 2011	Budapest	Hungary	Hajógyári Island (Sziget Festival)	—
11 August 2011	Jaroměř	Czech Republic	Brutal Assault	—
14 August 2011	Walton-on-Trent	England	Catton Hall (Bloodstock Open Air)	—
Leg 7 – South America
25 September 2011	Rio de Janeiro	Brazil	City of Rock (Rock in Rio)	—
Leg 8 – Europe
2 October 2011	Zürich	Switzerland	Hallenstadion	U.K. Subs; Anti-Nowhere League
23 October 2011	Toulouse	France	Zénith	U.K. Subs; Anti-Nowhere League
25 October 2011	Clermont-Ferrand	France	Zénith d'Auvergne	U.K. Subs; Anti-Nowhere League
26 October 2011	Nantes	France	Zénith Nantes Métropole	U.K. Subs; Anti-Nowhere League
28 October 2011	Brussels	Belgium	Forest National	U.K. Subs; Anti-Nowhere League
29 October 2011	Zwolle	Netherlands	Meerhal	U.K. Subs; Anti-Nowhere League
31 October 2011	Lille	France	Zénith de Lille	U.K. Subs; Anti-Nowhere League
2 November 2011	Wolverhampton	England	Wolverhampton Civic Hall	U.K. Subs; Anti-Nowhere League
3 November 2011	Newcastle	England	Newcastle City Hall	U.K. Subs; Anti-Nowhere League
5 November 2011	Glasgow	Scotland	O_{2} Academy Glasgow	U.K. Subs; Anti-Nowhere League
6 November 2011	Liverpool	England	Mountford Hall	U.K. Subs; Anti-Nowhere League
8 November 2011	Bristol	England	Colston Hall	U.K. Subs; Anti-Nowhere League
12 November 2011	London	England	HMV Hammersmith Apollo	U.K. Subs; Anti-Nowhere League
14 November 2011	Plymouth	England	Plymouth Pavilions	U.K. Subs; Anti-Nowhere League
15 November 2011	Southampton	England	Southampton Guildhall	U.K. Subs; Anti-Nowhere League
17 November 2011	Nottingham	England	Royal Court Centre	U.K. Subs; Anti-Nowhere League
18 November 2011	Manchester	England	O_{2} Apollo Manchester	U.K. Subs; Anti-Nowhere League
21 November 2011	Paris	France	Zénith Paris	No One Is Innocent
23 November 2011	Berlin	Germany	Columbiahalle	Graveyard; Loaded
24 November 2011	Leipzig	Germany	Haus Auensee	Graveyard; Loaded
26 November 2011	Munich	Germany	Zenith	Graveyard; Loaded
27 November 2011	Stuttgart	Germany	Hanns-Martin-Schleyer-Halle	Graveyard; Loaded
29 November 2011	Düsseldorf	Germany	Mitsubishi Electric Halle	Graveyard; Loaded
30 November 2011	Hamburg	Germany	Alsterdorfer Sporthalle	Graveyard; Loaded
2 December 2011	Aalborg	Denmark	Skråen	Jorn
4 December 2011	Copenhagen	Denmark	Vega	Jorn
5 December 2011	Oslo	Norway	Sentrum Scene	Jorn
7 December 2011	Bergen	Norway	Peer Gynt Salen	Jorn
9 December 2011	Gothenburg	Sweden	Lisebergshallen	Jorn
10 December 2011	Stockholm	Sweden	Arenan	Jorn
12 December 2011	Örebro	Sweden	Conventum Arena	Jorn
13 December 2011	Sundsvall	Sweden	Sporthallen	Jorn
15 December 2011	Luleå	Sweden	Pontushallen	Jorn
17 December 2011	Tampere	Finland	Pakkahuone	Jorn
18 December 2011	Helsinki	Finland	Kaapelitehdas	Jorn
Leg 9 – Gigantour
26 January 2012	Camden	United States	Susquehanna Bank Center	—
27 January 2012	Uncasville	United States	Mohegan Sun Arena	—
28 January 2012	New York City	United States	The Theater at Madison Square Garden	—
29 January 2012	Lowell	United States	Tsongas Center	—
1 February 2012	Glens Falls	United States	Glens Falls Civic Center	—
2 February 2012	Quebec City	Canada	Colisée Pepsi	—
3 February 2012	Montreal	Canada	Bell Centre	—
5 February 2012	Kingston	Canada	K-Rock Centre	—
7 February 2012	Oshawa	Canada	General Motors Centre	—
8 February 2012	Hamilton	Canada	Copps Coliseum	—
9 February 2012	Auburn Hills	United States	The Palace of Auburn Hills	—
10 February 2012	Chicago	United States	Aragon Ballroom	—
12 February 2012	Milwaukee	United States	Eagles Ballroom	—
14 February 2012	Saint Paul	United States	Myth	—
16 February 2012	Saskatoon	Canada	Prairieland Park	—
17 February 2012	Edmonton	Canada	Shaw Conference Centre	—
18 February 2012	Calgary	Canada	Big 4 Building	—
20 February 2012	Abbotsford	Canada	Abbotsford Entertainment & Sports Centre	—
21 February 2012	Kent	United States	ShoWare Center	—
23 February 2012	San Jose	United States	Event Center Arena	—
24 February 2012	Los Angeles	United States	Gibson Amphitheatre	—
25 February 2012	Phoenix	United States	Comerica Theatre	—
26 February 2012	Albuquerque	United States	Tingley Coliseum	—
Leg 10 – Europe
30 May 2012	Yverdon-les-Bains	Switzerland	Lake Geneva (Sonisphere Festival)	—
1 June 2012	Nürburg	Germany	Nürburgring (Rock am Ring)	—
3 June 2012	Nuremberg	Germany	Zeppelinfeld (Rock im Park)	—
8 June 2012	Norje	Sweden	Norje Havsbad (Sweden Rock Festival)	—
10 June 2012	Bergen	Norway	Grieg Hall	Sahg
17 June 2012	Bucharest	Romania	Romexpo (OST Fest)	—
23 June 2012	Roeser	Luxembourg	Herchesfeld (Rock-A-Field Open Air)	—
24 June 2012	Dessel	Belgium	Boeretang (Graspop Metal Meeting)	—
