= Zenit (sports society) =

The emblem of the VSS Zenit

Zenit (Russian: Зенит; meaning zenith) was the All-Union VSS.

Information about the Voluntary Sports Society "Zenit" which united athletes, physical education professionals, sports teams of enterprises, organizations and educational institutions of the defense industry was prohibited from publication because it could be used to determine the location of secret enterprises.

The name has been retained after the fall of the Soviet Union and the VSS system, notably by FC Zenit Saint Petersburg, which won the 2007 and 2010 Russian Premier League seasons, the 2007–08 UEFA Cup, and the 2008 UEFA Super Cup in association football.

== Notable members ==
- Yelena Davydova (artistic gymnastics)
- Anatoly Mikhailov (athletics)
- Mariya Pisareva (athletics)
- Tamara Tyshkevich (athletics)
- Galina Zybina (athletics)
- Vladimir Nikitin (cross-country skiing)
- Larisa Selezneva (figure skating)
- Anatoli Fedyukin (handball)
- Lyudmila Titova (speed skating)
- Vladimir Salnikov (swimming)

== See also ==
- FC Zenit (disambiguation), a number of European football clubs
