= USS Snatch =

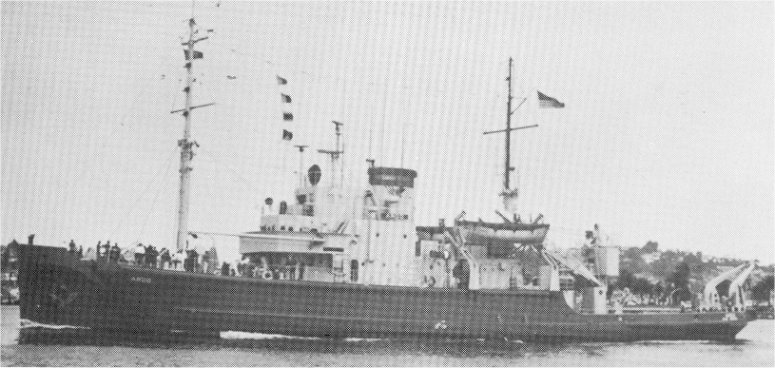
- As RV Argo

History

United States
- Builder: Basalt Rock Company
- Laid down: 28 January 1943
- Launched: 8 April 1944
- Commissioned: USS Snatch (ARS-27), 11 December 1944
- Decommissioned: 23 December 1946
- In service: USNS Snatch (T-AGOR-18), April 1967
- Out of service: March 1970
- Stricken: 1 May 1970
- Fate: Sold for scrapping 8 November 1971

General characteristics
- Tonnage: 1,441 tons
- Displacement: 1,630 long tons or 1,660 metric tons
- Length: 213 ft 6 in (65.07 m)
- Beam: 39 ft (12 m)
- Draft: 14 ft 4 in (4.37 m)
- Propulsion: Diesel-electric, twin screws, 2,780 hp (2.07 MW)
- Speed: 15 knots (28 km/h; 17 mph)
- Complement: 120
- Armament: Four 40 mm guns, four 0.5 in (12.7 mm) machine guns

USS Snatch (ARS-27), well known as Scripps RV Argo after conversion to scientific research, was a Diver-class rescue and salvage ship commissioned by the United States Navy during World War II and in service from 11 December 1944 through 23 December 1946. Her task was to come to the aid of stricken vessels. The ship is better known for her scientific research role as the Scripps Institution of Oceanography (SIO) research vessel RV Argo. It is that name, apparently not formally recognized by Navy that maintained title to the vessel, found in the scientific literature and public releases about her wide ranging research voyages.

== U.S. Naval service ==
Snatch was laid down on 28 September 1943 by the Basalt Rock Company in Napa, California; launched on 8 April 1944; sponsored by Mrs. S. B. Johnson; and commissioned on 11 December 1944.

=== World War II service ===
Snatch conducted her shakedown cruise off San Diego, California, and returned to San Francisco, California, from where she steamed on 20 February 1945 for Manus, Admiralty Islands. Under tow were the vessels (covered lighter (self-propelled)) YF-622, YF-919, and YF-926. On 4 March, she ran into heavy seas which caused 919 and 926 to collide. YF-926 was taking water and down by the bow. The seas were still rough three days later so the salvage ship changed course for Kealakekua Bay, Hawaii. YF-926 sank on the 8th, the day before reaching port. Two days later, Snatch sailed to Pearl Harbor towing the remaining lighters.

Snatch steamed to Eniwetok, Marshall Islands, on 17 March. From 5 to 9 April, she participated in salvage operations of SS Esso Washington, which was grounded near the entrance of Eniwetok Passage. On the 14th, the ship steamed for Guam with a dredge and two barges in tow. En route, the ship was diverted to Tinian, Mariana Islands, arriving on 23 April. On 15 May, she sailed for Leyte Gulf, Philippine Islands, calling at Ulithi to take YF-606 and YF-1001 in tow.

Snatch operated in the Philippine Islands from 26 May to 30 December 1945 when she sailed for San Diego, California. She operated from there until 23 December 1946 when she was placed in reserve, out of commission, and berthed there.

=== Military awards and honors ===
Snatch's crew was eligible for the following medals:

- American Campaign Medal
- Asiatic–Pacific Campaign Medal
- World War II Victory Medal
- Philippines Liberation Medal

== Scientific career as RV Argo ==
The U. S. Navy, largely through the Office of Naval Research (ONR), was a major funding source throughout the early days of oceanography. Up to 90% of U.S. oceanographic research funding from 1946 through 1965 came from Navy with the Scripps Institution of Oceanography being one of the notable research facilities and recipients of that funding. Such funding provided for both the conversion of former naval vessels to research and for their operation.

The USS Snatch (ARS-27) was one of two (the other being sister ship USS Chain (ARS-20), later RV Chain, operating from the Woods Hole Oceanographic Institute) notable vessels undergoing such conversion. In 1960 the Snatch was converted into the vessel known in scientific literature and publicity relating to oceanography as the Scripps vessel RV Argo. The ship operated as a Scripps research vessel from that conversion in 1960 until return to Navy custody for scrapping in 1970.

=== Research voyages ===
As RV Argo the ship conducted much significant research during what was termed the "Golden Age of Oceanography" by Roger Revelle.

Among the notable expeditions was the series for the International Indian Ocean Expedition (IIOE) of 1960 through 1965 when Argo participated in the Monsoon Expedition of 1960–1961 and, with RV Horizon, participated the 1962 Lusiad Expedition. The ship's work added information of submarine topography (bathymetry) and geophysical properties in that relatively unexplored ocean that contributed to understanding the global ridge system and geology as well as collecting data in other disciplines.

The Argo also made an interesting scientific discovery in the Eastern Pacific Ocean. In June of 1965, the Argo was on a student cruise for Scripps Institution of Oceanography’s Department of Earth Sciences. On June 22, a group of graduate students, led by Dr. Manuel N. Bass, discovered a previously unknown submarine mountain about 1,300 miles west-southwest of Acapulco, Mexico. The mountain was named "Dowd Guyot" by the scientists on board the Argo in honor of geochemistry graduate student William Laurence Dowd, who was murdered on June 13 by a burglar whom he walked in on while ransacking his apartment. Dowd Guyot was originally thought to be an isolated seamount, which would be unusual because seamounts are normally found in linear groups called "hotspot tracks" due to their formation on moving tectonic plates above geologic hot spots. However, in 1988 the U.S. Research Vessel "Thomas Washington" discovered two other seamounts aligned with Dowd Guyot, 40 miles and 60 miles to the northwest. Collectively, these three seamounts are now known as the Acapulco Seamounts.

During 1966 the ship did winter work in the northwestern Pacific, Bering Sea, and the Okhotsk Sea.

Argo paired again with RV Horizon for the 1967 Nova expedition conducted in the southwest Pacific. Significant information on the geological structures were reported and contributed to modern knowledge of global geology.

During the Circe Expedition (1968–1969) concentrating on the geology and geophysics of the Pacific, Indian and Atlantic, Argo worked in the Southwest Indian Ridge and collected specimens of "lower crustal matic and upper mantle ultramatic rocks never before recovered in oceanic areas" while also field-testing a shipboard computer linked to a prototype satellite navigation system.

The ship features in the experience of a number of the well known names in oceanography and has itself given its name to ocean features. The Argo fracture zone (11°30' S 69°30' E – 16°00' S 63°00' E) is noted along with the North Australian Basin (14°30' S 116°00' E) as among a number of the ship's discoveries. The note in the GEBCO Gazetteer for the fracture zone is:

Discoverer: R/V Argo 1960, 1968, 1960 Recognized on SIO's R/V Argo, Lusiad Expedition, 1962–63. Mapped in 1968, Circe Expedition"

=== Reclassification to AGOR-18 ===
After seven years of service under Office of Naval Research funding and sponsorship at Scripps and the buildup of national oceanographic resources ship formally became part of the Navy's new Auxiliary General Oceanographic Research (AGOR) fleet. The ship was changed for administrative purposes by Navy on 1 April 1967 to AGOR-18 classification and administrative ownership by the Military Sea Transportation Service (MSTS) while continuing operations as the Scripps vessel R/V Argo.

== Final decommissioning ==
The ship was returned to US Naval custody in March 1970 and struck from the Naval Register, 1 May 1970. Final disposition: sold for scrapping, 8 November 1971, to S.S. Zee, Taiwan.
