= Le Zénith =

Type of multi-purpose halls and indoor arenas in France

Le Zénith (French pronunciation: [lə zenit]) is the name given to a series of indoor arenas in France. The first arena, the "Zénith Paris" is a rejuvenation of the Pavillon de Paris. In French culture, the word "zénith" has become synonymous with "theater". A zénith is a theater that can accommodate concert tours, variety shows, plays, musicals and dance recitals. All zeniths carry a similar internal design of an indoor amphitheater that can seat at least 3,000 spectators.

A venue was planned to open in Saint-Denis, Réunion entitled Zénith du Port. The arena was proposed in 2005 by the city council. Planned to open in 2008 with a capacity of 6,000, the construction of the arena was shut down. It was determined the venue would not be profitable as there was no research done to see which events the arena could house. They also felt the venue would be a hard sell to bring in international talent. Kabardock was built on the proposed site of the zenith.

== Zénith Paris ==
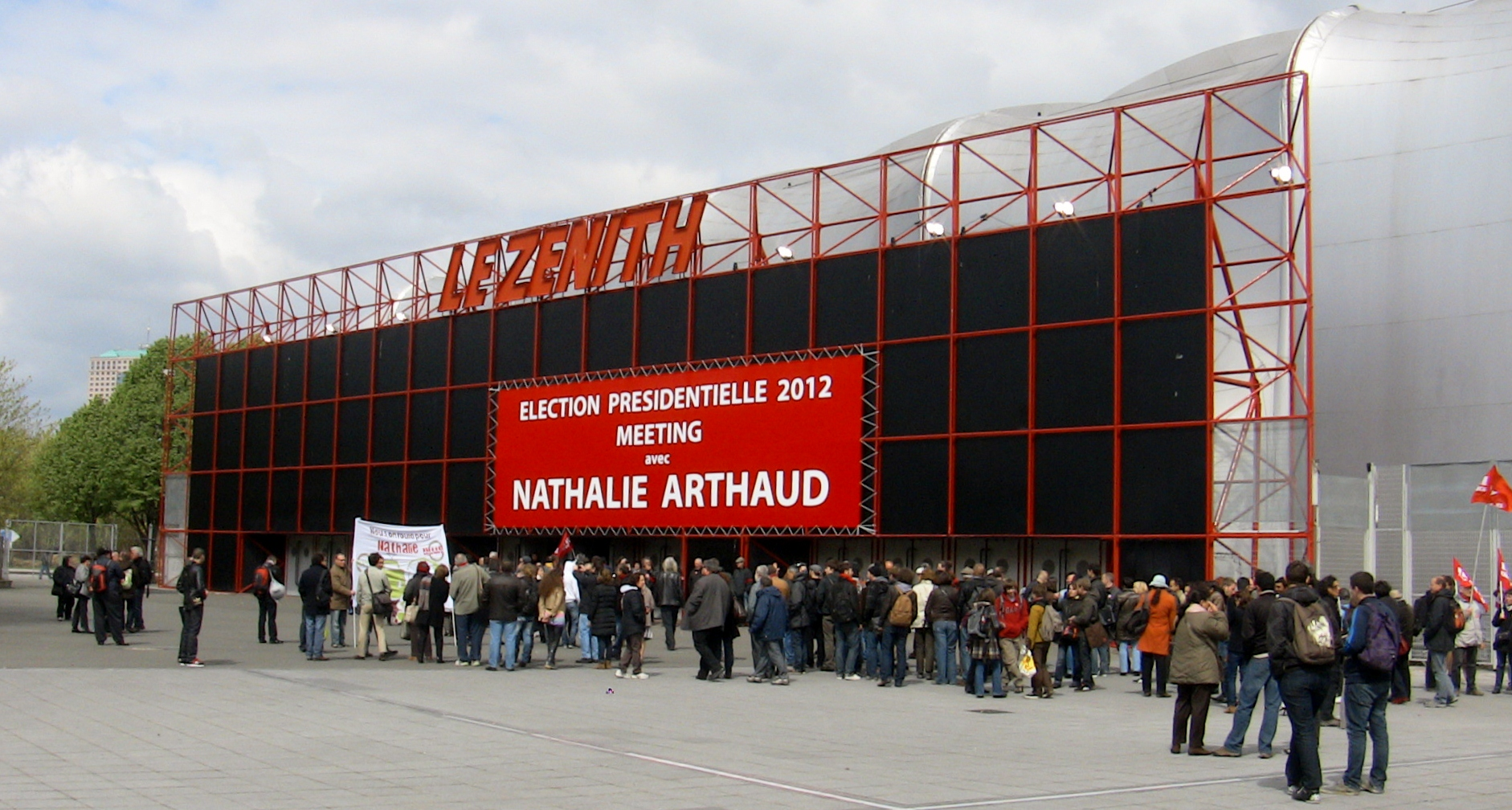
Exterior of arena during a meeting for the Lutte Ouvrière

- Address: Allée du Zénith, 75019 Paris, France
- Built: 1983
- Opened: January 1984
- Capacity: ~6,300
- Website: Le Zénith de Paris website

The Zénith Paris—La Villette is an indoor arena in the 19th arrondissement in Paris. The arena was built in 1983 at the site of the former music hall, Pavillon de Paris, by architects Phillippe Chaix and Jean-Paul Morel. The construction of the arena was initiated by Minister of Culture, Jack Lang, to maintain the rock and roll scene to Paris.

The first musician to perform at the venue was French singer-songwriter Renaud Séchan. Over the years, the venue has played host to many French artists including Jenifer, Jean-Jacques Goldman, Vanessa Paradis, Mr. Hankey, Johnny Hallyday, Alizée, and Michel Sardou. Several international artists have played the venue including Koffi Olomidé, Werrason, Janet Jackson, Suprême NTM, Sigur Rós, Pantera, Toto, Blur, Nas, Björk, Lara Fabian, Britney Spears, Christina Aguilera, Bruce Springsteen, Grateful Dead, Alicia Keys, Demi Lovato, Anastacia, Rihanna, Amy Winehouse, Korean K-pop group Super Junior, LOONA, Finnish band Nightwish, and Japanese band L'Arc-en-Ciel. Live albums by Simple Minds, The Cure, Muse, Evanescence, Morrissey, Les Cowboys Fringants, The Hives, Archive, and Chico Buarque have been recorded at the venue.

The arena has hosted the MTV Europe Music Awards in 1995, World Wrestling Entertainment in 2007 and Total Nonstop Action Wrestling in 2010.

It is the first incarnation of the "Le Zénith" franchise.

== Le Zénith Sud ==
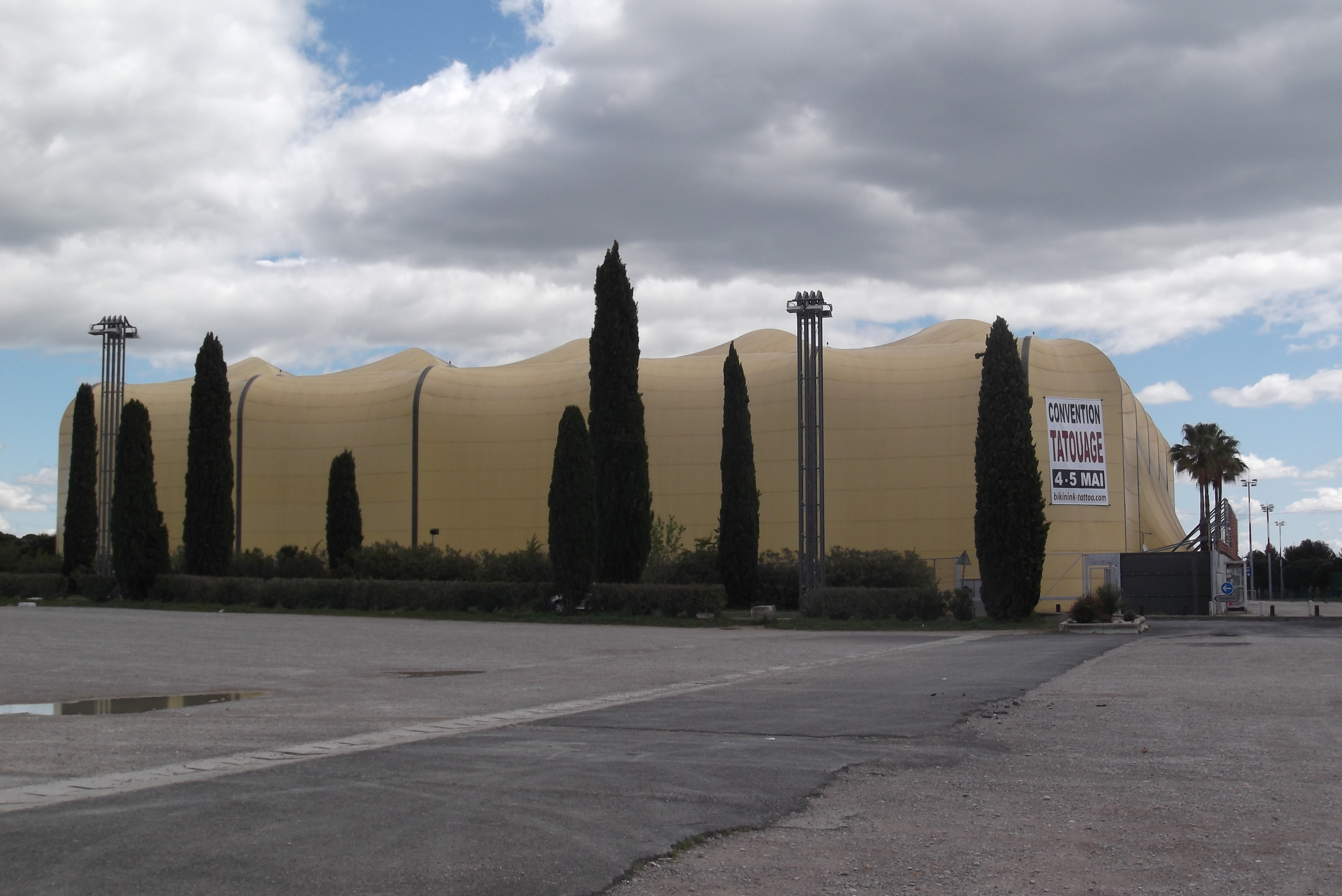
Exterior of Zénith Sud (2013)

- Address: 2733 Avenue Albert Einstein 34000 Montpellier, France
- Built: 1985—1986
- Opened: 1986
- Capacity: 6,300
- Website: Zénith Sud Website

Le Zénith Sud (originally known as Zénith de Montpellier) is an indoor arena in Montpellier. The venue was designed by architects Phillippe Chaix and Jean-Paul Morel, who have designed several other "Le Zénith" buildings. The building opened in 1986 and was renovated in 2001 and 2006. It was the main arena in Montpellier until the Arena Montpellier opened in 2010. Over the course of 25 years, the arena has hosted concerts by Ben Harper, Muse, -M-, Yannick Noah and Deep Purple.

It is the second incarnation of the "Le Zénith" franchise.

== Zénith Oméga de Toulon ==
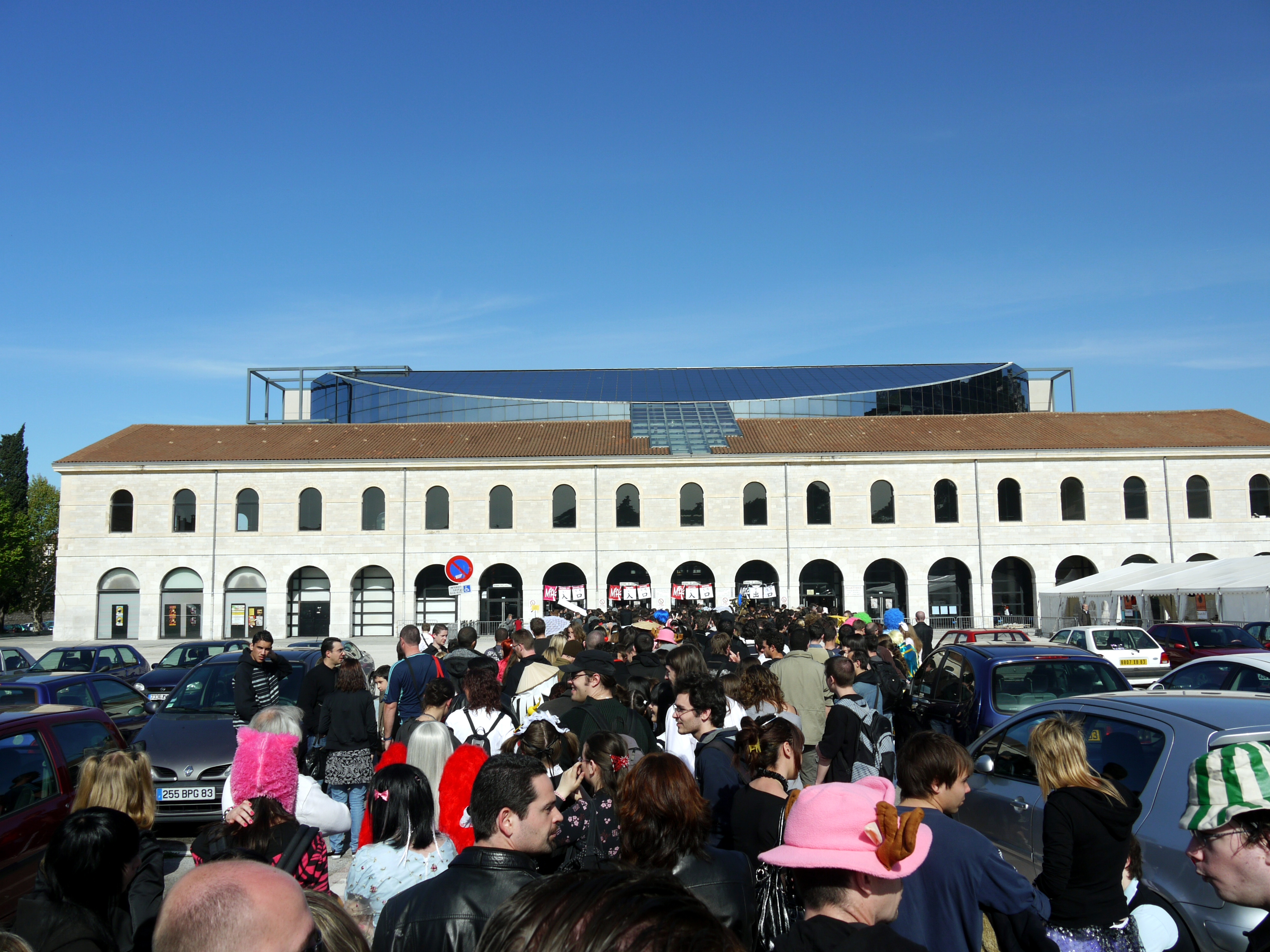
Rear entrance of venue

- Address: Boulevard du Commandant Nicolas 83000 Toulon, France
- Built: Unknown
- Opened: September 1992
- Capacity: 8,875
- Website: Zénith Oméga de Toulon Website

The Zénith Oméga de Toulon (also known as Zénith Omega) is an indoor arena located in Toulon. The arena opened September 7, 1992. The venue also has a nightclub called Omega Live. The space is used for private events and after parties. The arena has hosted concerts by Mylène Farmer, Zazie, Depeche Mode, Jenifer, Tina Turner and David Bowie.

It is the third incarnation of the "Le Zénith" franchise.

== Zénith de Pau ==
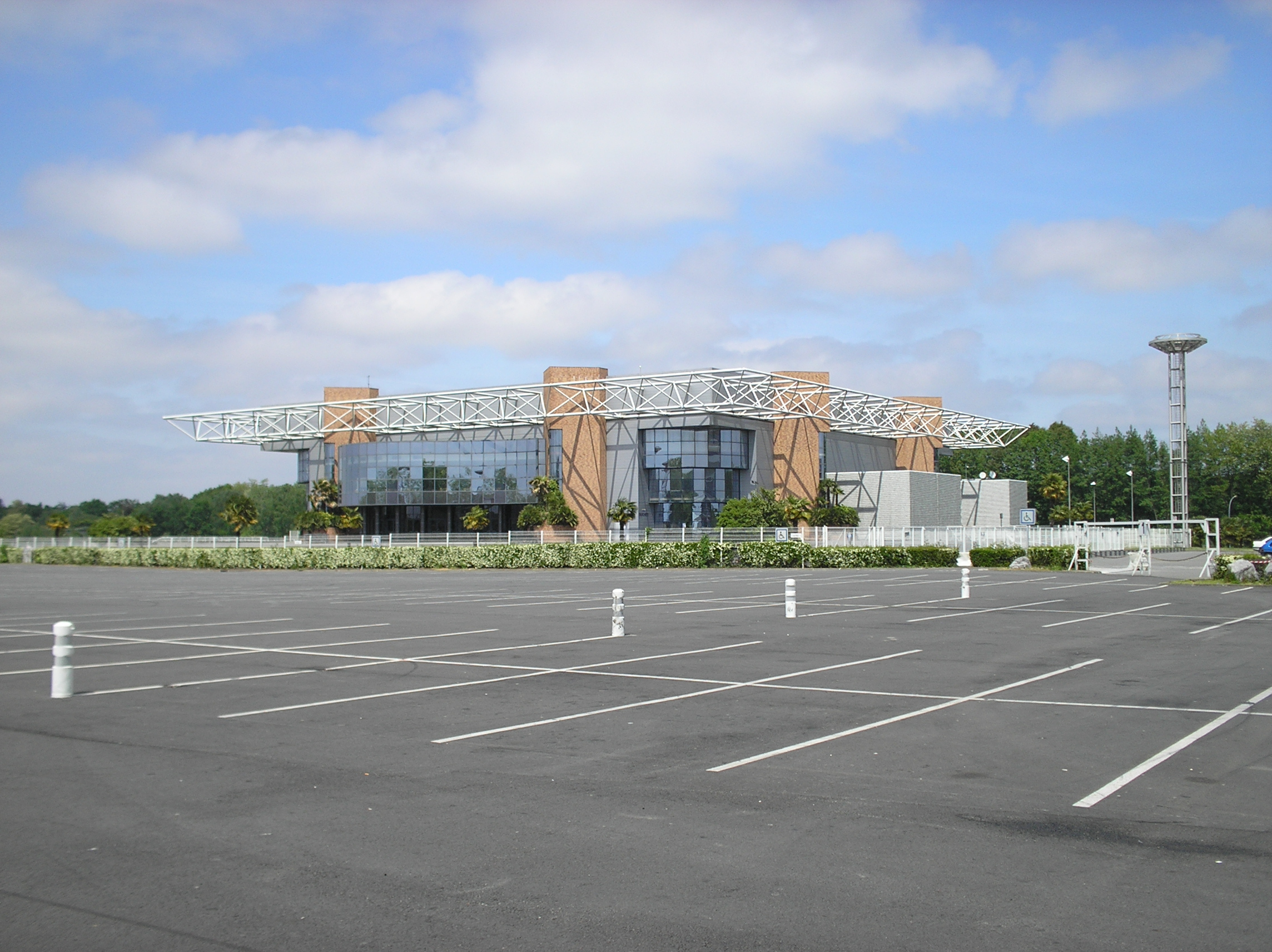
Exterior of Zénith de Pau

- Address: Boulevard du Cami-Salié 64000 Pau, France
- Built: 1990—1992
- Opened: December 1992
- Capacity: 7,500
- Website: Zénith de Pau Website

The Zénith de Pau is an indoor arena located in Pau. Located near the Hippodrome du Pont-Long, the arena's design is identical to the Palais des Sports de Pau, which is nearby the venue. The venue opened on December 12, 1992. A concert by Johnny Hallyday followed the next day. The venue host many musical events along with theatrical shows. Concerts by Garou, André Rieu, Frédéric François, Véronique Sanson and William Sheller.

It is the fourth incarnation of the "Le Zénith" franchise.

== Zénith de Nancy ==
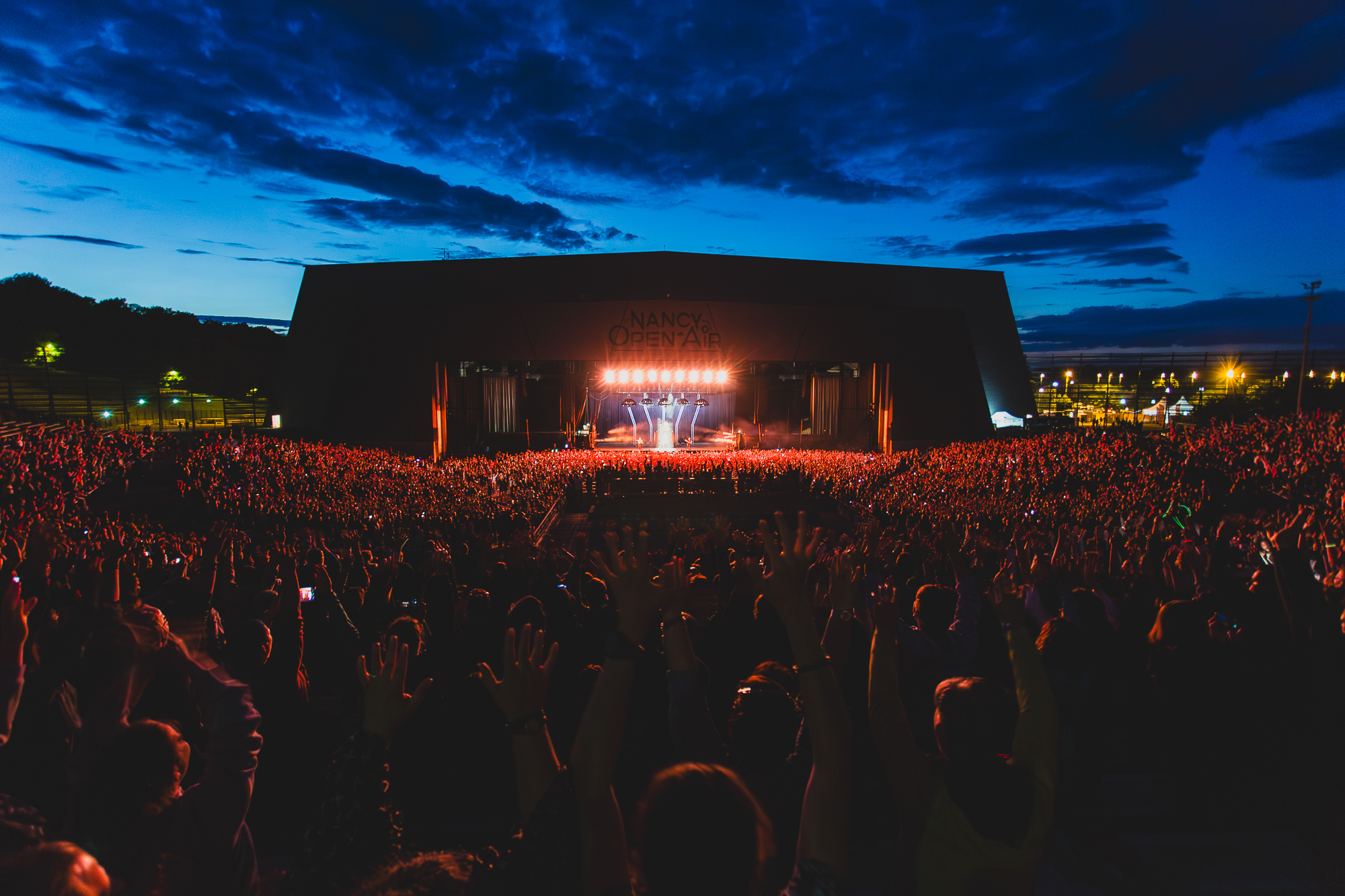
Zénith de Nancy in amphitheater mode

- Address: Rue du Zénith 54320 Maxéville, France
- Built: Unknown
- Opened: 1993
- Capacity: 4,718 (arena), 19,657 (amphitheater)
- Website: Zénith de Nancy Website

The Zénith de Nancy (also known as Zénith Nancy de Maxéville or Zénith du Grand Nancy) is an indoor arena located in Maxéville, northwest of Nancy. The venue consists of an indoor theatre (known as "Grande salle du Zénith") and an outdoor amphitheater. It is the largest and most frequently used zénith. The venue has hosted concerts by Rammstein, Depeche Mode, Elton John, Guns N' Roses, Tokio Hotel and Natasha St-Pier.

It is the fifth incarnation of the "Le Zénith" franchise.

== Zénith de Caen ==
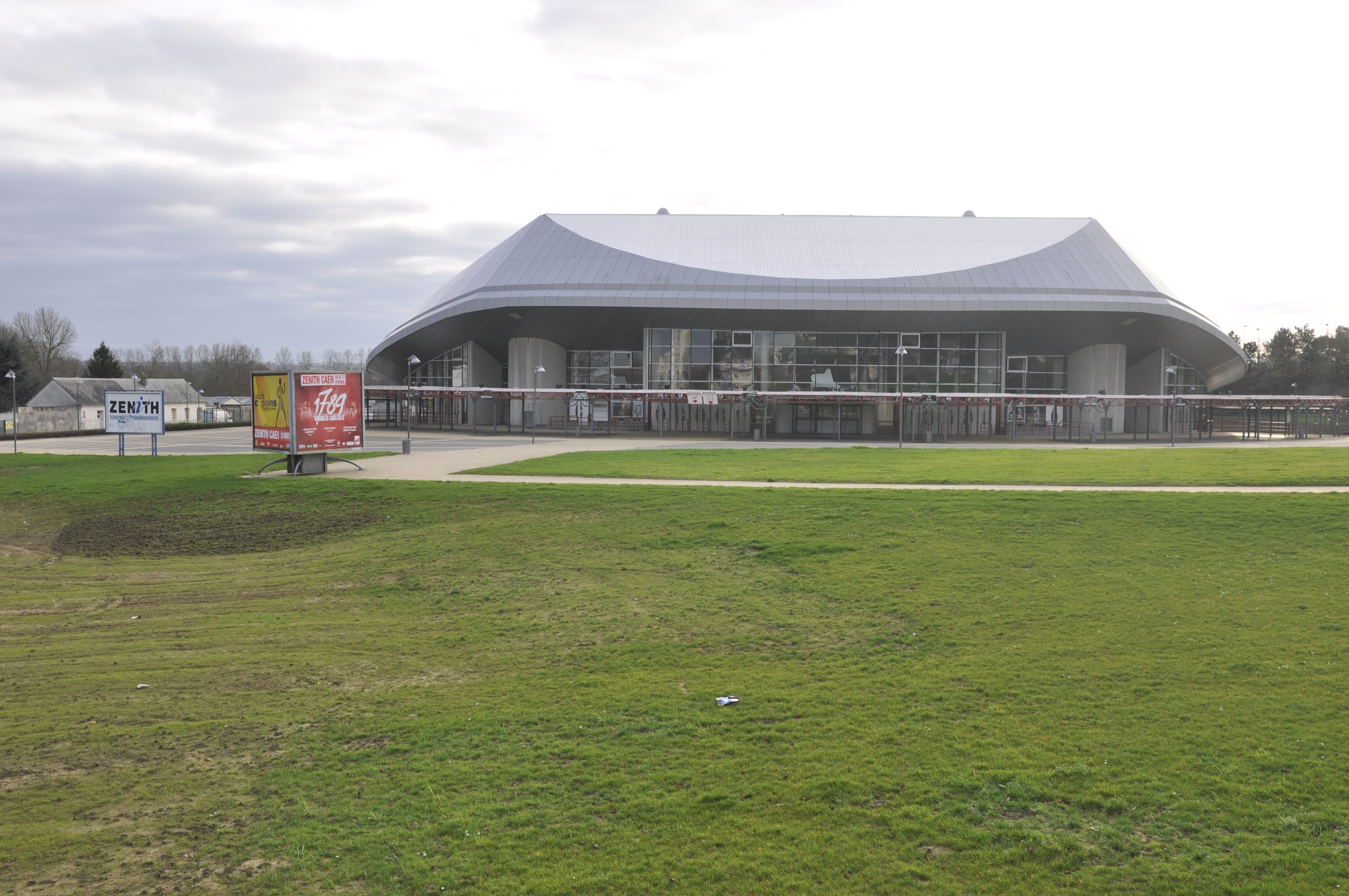
View outdoor of Zénith de Caen

- Address: Rue Joseph Philippon 14000 Caen, France
- Built: Unknown
- Opened: June 1993
- Capacity: ~7,000
- Website: Zénith de Caen Website

The Zénith de Caen (also known as Zénith Caen—Normandie) is an indoor arena located in Caen. The venue, designed by Jacques Millet and Claude Renouf, opened in June 1993. Leonard Cohen and Eddy Mitchell, along with stage performances of Grease and the Cuban National Ballet.

It is the sixth incarnation of the "Le Zénith" franchise.

== Zénith de Lille ==
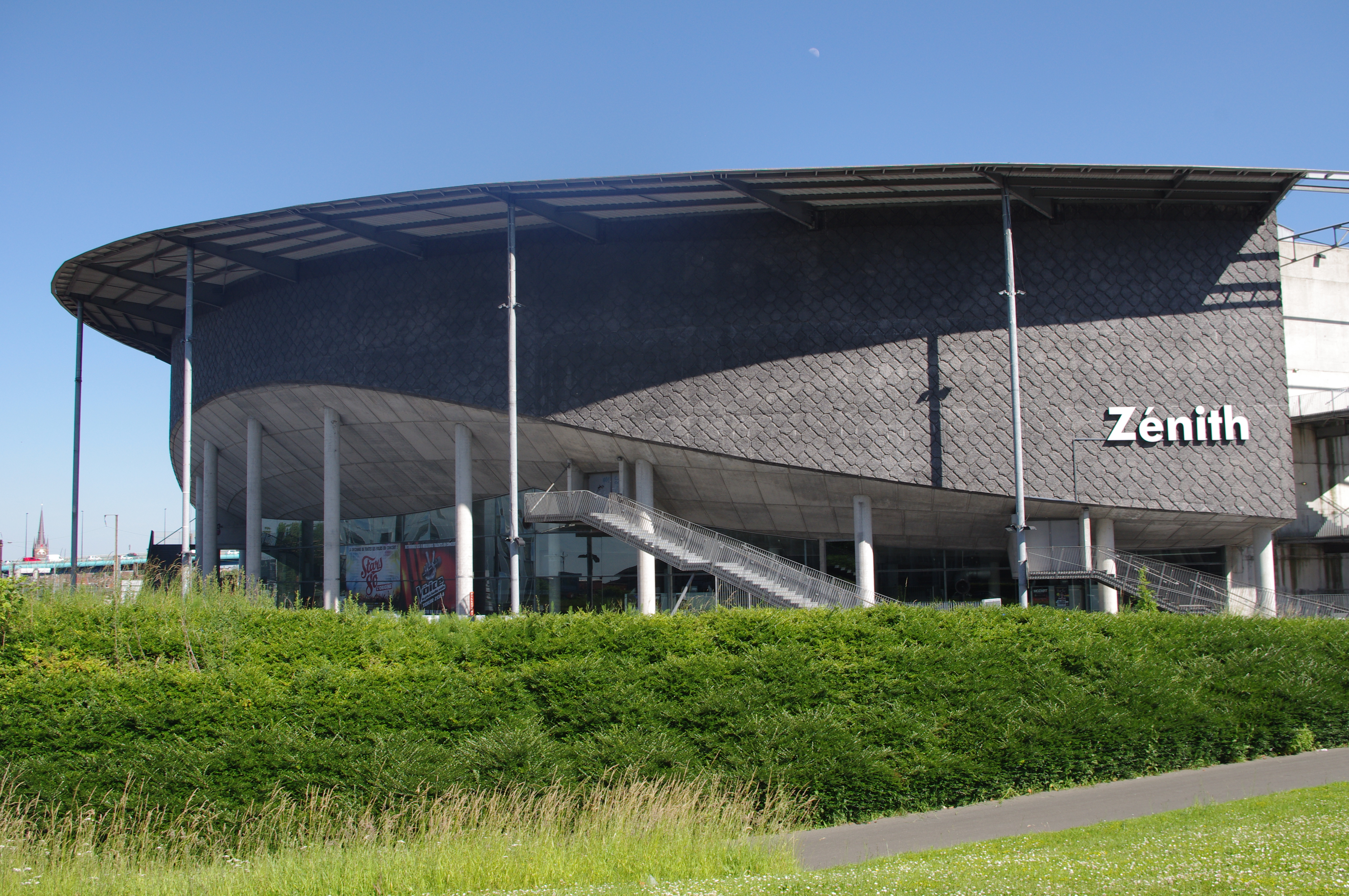
Zénith de Lille from the outside.

- Address: 1 Boulevard des Cités Unies 59777 Lille, France
- Built: 1988—1994
- Opened: June 1994 (Arena opened in November 1994)
- Capacity: 7,000
- Website: Zénith de Lille Website

The Zénith de Lille (also known as Zénith Arena) is an indoor arena located in Lille near the Université du Droit et de la Santé. The arena was a long term project commissioned by former mayor of Lille, Pierre Mauroy. The space was intended to be a competitor for Paris' Palais Omnisports de Paris-Bercy to bring sporting events, theatrical shows and concerts from South England. The project began in 1980 however it was not completed until June 1994.

The venue, designed by Rem Koolhaas, contains three auditoriums, 28 meetings rooms, a banquet hall and the Zénith Arena. It has hosted concerts by Kylie Minogue, Aretha Franklin, Goldfrapp, Dusty Springfield, Eminem and Portishead.

It is the seventh incarnation of the "Le Zénith" franchise.

== Zénith d'Orléans ==
- Address: 1 Rue du Président Robert Schuman, 45100 Orléans, France
- Built: 1995—1996
- Opened: September 1996
- Capacity: 6,900
- Website: Zénith d'Orléans Website

The Zénith d'Orléans (also known as Zénith Orléans) is an indoor arena located in Orléans. The venue opened on September 26, 1996. The first concert was by Charles Aznavour on October 3, 1996. Not only does the venue host entertainment events, it is one of the few zéniths that serves as a sporting arena. The venue is the home arena of the Orléans Loiret Basket. The arena has hosted concerts by Grégoire, Julien Clerc, Patrick Fiori, Élie Semoun and Joan Baez.

It is the eighth incarnation of the "Le Zénith" franchise.

== Zénith de Toulouse ==
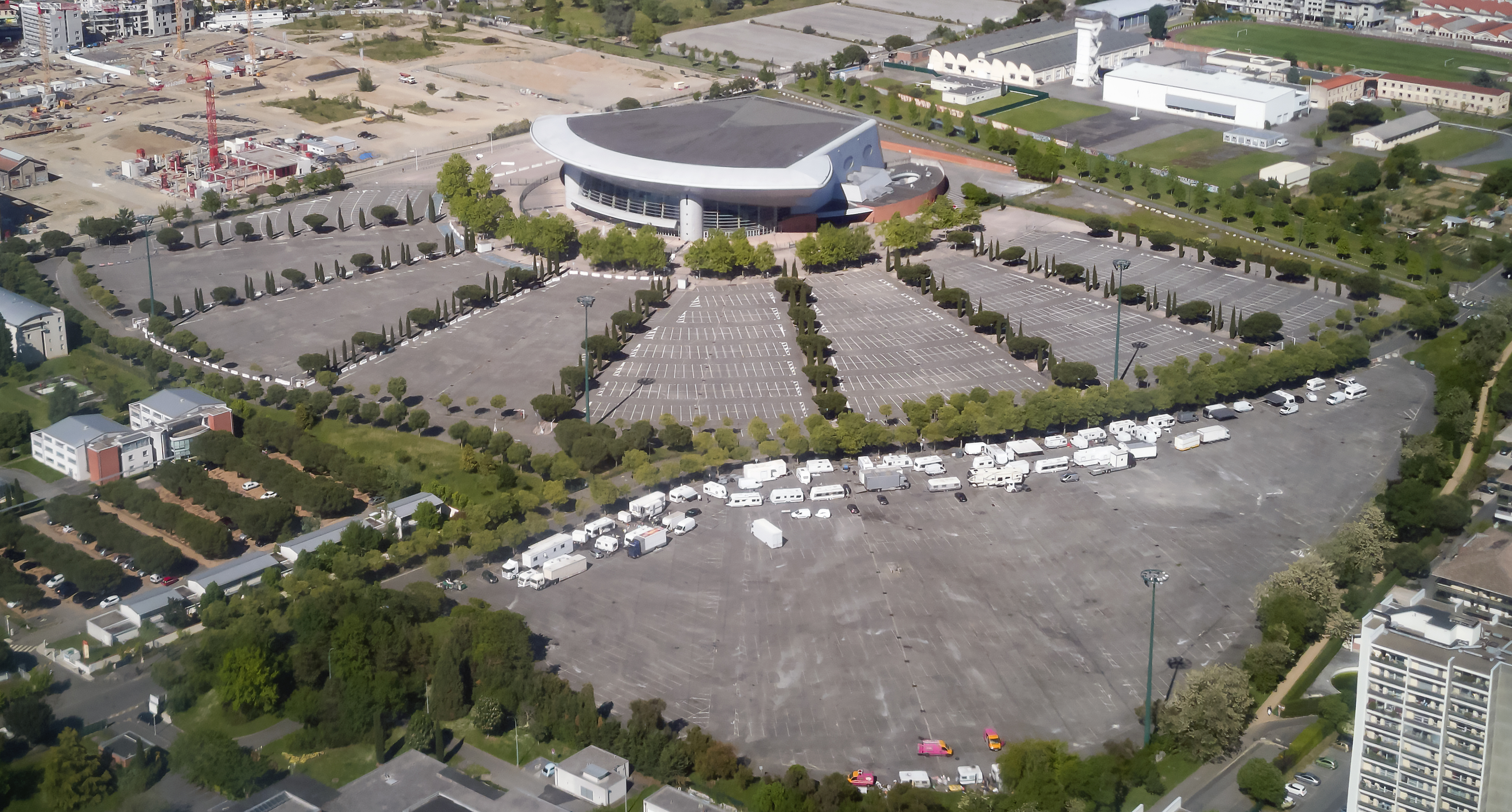
Le Zénith de Toulouse

- Address: 11 Avenue Raymond Badiou 31000 Toulouse, France
- Built: 1998
- Opened: April 1999
- Capacity: 9,000
- Website: Le Zénith de Toulouse Website

The Zénith de Toulouse is an indoor arena located in Toulouse. The venue was designed by André and Serge Gresy, who have also done the Palais Nikaïa, Zénith d'Auvergne and the Grande Halle d'Auvergne. The arena began construction in 1998 and opened in April 1999. The first event held at the venue was a concert organized by Jean-Pierre Mader. The concert was hosted by French actor Ticky Holgado and featured performances by Chevaliers du fil, Pauline Ester, Bernardo Sandoval, and the l’Orchestre de chambre national de Toulouse. The venue faced renovations after the explosion at the nearby AZF Factory.

Over the years, the arena has hosted concerts by The Cranberries, Muse, Depeche Mode, Kylie Minogue, Norah Jones, Green Day, The Who and Snarky Puppy.

It is the ninth incarnation of the "Le Zénith" franchise.

List of entertainment events held at Zénith de Toulouse
Date	Performer(s)	Event	Opening Act(s)	Attendance	Revenue	Additional notes
1999
April 27	Pierre Bachelet					
April 28	Zazie					
June 3	Scorpions					
June 4	Zucchero					
June 23	Lenny Kravitz					
June 26	Alanis Morissette					
November 16	Francis Cabrel					
November 17	Francis Cabrel					
November 18	Sylvie Vartan					
December 1	Mylène Farmer					
2000
April 3	The Cure	The Dream Tour				
May 27	Patrick Bruel					
June 2	Johnny Hallyday					
June 3	Johnny Hallyday					
December 4	Patrick Bruel					
2003
May 3	Lorie					
June 4	Renaud					
June 5	Renaud					
June 10	Moby					
July 10	Patrick Bruel					The show was originally scheduled for July 7, 2003.
2004
March 22	Muse	Absolution Tour				
April 27	Lorie	Week end Tour				
April 28	Lorie	Week end Tour				
June 1	Evanescence					
June 10	Norah Jones					
October 12	Garou	Tournée 2004				
November 17	Charles Aznavour					
November 18	Charles Aznavour					
November 19	Charles Aznavour					
December 11	Jenifer	Tournée le passage				
2005
March 30	Jenifer	Tournée le passage				
June 26	Snoop Dogg					
September 22	50 Cent			3,500		
November 18	Coldplay	Twisted Logic Tour				
2006
February 3	Depeche Mode	Touring the Angel				
February 4	Oasis	Don't Believe the Truth Tour	Stereophonics			
March 15	Toto	Falling in Between Tour				
March 11	Bénabar					
March 16	Thomas Fersen					
April 18	Corneille					
May 17	Jean Louis Aubert					
June 14	Alain Souchon					
2007
May 24	Michel Sardou	Zénith 2007				
October 9	Status Quo	Dodgy Holiday Tour				
October 16	Mika	Dodgy Holiday Tour				
October 20	Zazie	Totem Tour				
October 22	Tokio Hotel	Zimmer 483 Tour				
October 25	Kool & the Gang					
November 15	Charles Aznavour					
November 16	Charles Aznavour					
November 19	Joe Cocker					
November 23	Vanessa Paradis	Divinidylle Tour				
November 29	Scorpions					
December 6	Michel Sardou					
December 7	Yannick Noah					
December 8	Calogero					
December 15	Bombes 2 Bal					
December 20	IAM					
2008
March 5	Sylvie Vartan					
March 19	Jenifer	Lunatique Tour		4,000		
April 8	Christophe Mae					
April 10	Cali					
May 20	Bernard Lavilliers					
September 13	Snoop Dogg					
October 30	Alicia Keys	As I Am Tour				
November 29	Lorie	Le tour 2Lor				
2009
February 17	Oasis	Dig Out Your Soul Tour	Poet in Process			
March 8	Muse	The Resistance Tour	Biffy Clyro			
October 9	Green Day	21st Century Breakdown World Tour	Prima Donna			
October 18	Indochine	Meteor Tour				
2010
March 8	The Cranberries					
March 23	Jean-Michel Jarre					
March 30	Indochine	Meteor Tour				
April 10	Matthieu Chedid					
April 20	The Prodigy					
April 30	Mika	Imaginarium Tour				
October 21	Chic; Kool & the Gang	Imaginarium Tour				
2011
March 11	Kylie Minogue	Aphrodite: Les Folies Tour				
October 23	Motörhead	The Wörld Is Yours Tour				
November 5	Alice Cooper	No More Mr. Nice Guy Tour				
November 17	Scorpions					
December 3	Zaz					
2012
February 6	Arctic Monkeys	Suck It and See Tour				
February 7	Julien Clerc					
February 22	Sting	Back to Bass Tour				
March 6	Shy'm	Shimi Tour				
June 14	Guns N' Roses	Up Close and Personal Tour				
December 6	Deep Purple	The Songs That Built Rock Tour		4,000		
2013
June 15	Toto	35th Anniversary Tour				
November 17	Patrick Bruel			6,500		
November 12	Indochine	Black City Tour	Klink Clock			
November 19	Bruno Mars	The Moonshine Jungle Tour	Mayer Hawthorne			
2014
March 25	Indochine	Black City Tour	Klink Clock			
April 14	Tal	À l'infini Tour		18,000 (including the October concert).		
April 29	Stromae	Racine Carrée Tour		31,000 (including the October concerts).		
May 26	Patrick Bruel			6,600		
September 25	Florent Pagny			6,500		
October 4	Tal	À l'infini Tour				
October 6	Pharrell Williams	Dear Girl Tour		9,500		
October 23	Stromae	Racine Carrée Tour				
October 24	Stromae	Racine Carrée Tour				
November 6	Pascal Obispo			6,600		
November 14	Shaka Ponk			10,500		
November 16	Peter Gabriel	Back to Front Tour		8,000		
November 26	Calogero			5,000		
2015
February 14	Violetta	Violetta Live	—	25,000		Two concerts per day were scheduled at 2:00 p.m. and 6:00 p.m.
February 15	Violetta	Violetta Live	—	25,000		Two concerts per day were scheduled at 2:00 p.m. and 6:00 p.m.
March 2015	Florent Pagny					
April 21	Shy'm	Paradoxale Tour				
June 20	M. Pokora	RED Tour				
October 20	Johnny Hallyday	Rester vivant Tour				
October 21	Johnny Hallyday	Rester vivant Tour				
December 17	M. Pokora	RED Tour				
2016
February 26	Chica Vampiro	VampiTour				
March 12	Johnny Hallyday	Rester Vivant Tour				
March 22	Nekfeu	Feu Tour				
April 20	Louane	Chambre 12 Tour				
June 16	Zazie	Heureux Tour				
June 17	Zazie	Heureux Tour				
October 11	Ben Harper	Call it what it is Tour	The Innocent Criminals			
October 30	Kids United			6,600		
December 3	Pascal Obispo					
2017
March 30	Saez	La tournée du manifeste				
April 13	Bigflo & Oli			22,000 (first two shows).		A third date was added due to high demand.
April 14	Bigflo & Oli			22,000 (first two shows).		A third date was added due to high demand.
April 15	Bigflo & Oli			22,000 (first two shows).		A third date was added due to high demand.
April 23	M. Pokora	My Way Tour				
May 11	Boulevard des airs					
November 22	Jamiroquai	Automaton Tour				
December 12	Elton John	Wonderful Crazy Night Tour	—			
December 17	M. Pokora	My Way Tour				
2018
January 30	Charles Aznavour					
February 1	Claudio Capeo					
February 2	Shaka Ponk					
February 18	Soy Luna	Soy Luna Live	—			
March 9	Indochine	13 Tour	Requin Chagrin			
March 11	Orelsan					
March 19	Franz Ferdinand					
March 25	Frédéric François					
March 26	Toto					
April 13	Bigflo & Oli			40,000		
April 14	Bigflo & Oli			40,000		
April 15	Bigflo & Oli			40,000		
April 16	Bigflo & Oli			40,000		
April 21	Kids United					
May 31	Louane	Louane Live				
October 3	Brigitte					
November 8	Indochine	13 Tour				
November 28	Bénabar	Tournée 2018				
November 30	Dadju	G20 Tour				
December 20	MC Solaar					
2019
May 9	Jenifer	Nouvelle Page 2 Tournées				
June 9	Shy'm	Agapé Tour				
October 11	M. Pokora	Pyramide Tour				
November 13	Angèle	Brol Tour				
November 16	Mika	Revelation Tour				
November 19	Snarky Puppy					
2020
February 12	Bigflo & Oli			11,000		
2022
March 10	Asaf Avidan	Anagnorisis Tour				
March 31	Orelsan	Tour 2022				The show was originally scheduled for January 27, 2022.
May 5	Angèle	Nonante-Cinq Tour				
May 9	Eddy de Pretto	À tous les bâtards Tour				The show was originally scheduled for January 14, 2022.
November 10	Tayc	Crystal destiny Tour				
November 14	The Cure	Shows of a Lost World				
November 20	Orelsan	Tour 2022				
December 16	Dadju	Culliman Tour				
2023
March 16	Lomepal	Mauvais Ordre Tour				
April 13	Bigflo & Oli					
April 14	Bigflo & Oli					
April 15	Bigflo & Oli					
April 22	Jenifer	N°9 Tour	Philippine Lavrey			
November 3	Zola					
November 11	Jain	The fool Tour				
November 16	Lomepal	Mauvais Ordre Tour	Shien			
November 25	M. Pokora	Épicentre Tour: La Tournée des 20 ans				
December 13	Djadja & Dinaz	Tour 2023				
2024
April 2	Hoshi	Coeur Parapluie Tour				
May 4	Patrick Bruel	Tour 2024				
June 7	M. Pokora	Épicentre Tour: La Tournée des 20 ans				
June 17	Deep Purple	Tour 2024	Sortilège			
December 4	Claudio Capeo					
December 12	Patrick Bruel	Tour 2024				
2025
January 15	Ninho; Niska	Goat Tour				
February 5	Clara Luciani					
February 25	Dadju & Tayc	Héritage: Le Tour - French Édition				
March 11	Indochine	Arena Tour	Lou Strummer	32,000		
March 12	Indochine	Arena Tour	Lou Strummer	32,000		
March 14	Indochine	Arena Tour	The Salinger	32,000		
March 15	Indochine	Arena Tour	The Salinger	32,000		
April 17	Tiakola	Bdlm Tour				
April 25	Pierre Garnier	Chaque seconde Tour				
October 24	Indochine	Arena Tour	Lou Sirkis	20,000		
October 25	Indochine	Arena Tour	Lou Sirkis	20,000		
November 8	Hamza	Insomnia Tour				
November 28	Helena	1ère: la tournée				
November 29	Julien Doré	Nouvelle tournée des Zéniths				
November 30	Gims	Le Dernier Tour		30,000		
December 1	Gims	Le Dernier Tour		30,000		
December 2	Gims	Le Dernier Tour		30,000		
December 19	M. Pokora	Adrenaline Tour				
2026
January 22	Clara Luciani	Tour MMXXV				
February 4	Orelsan	Tour 2026				A second show was added due to high demand.
February 5	Orelsan	Tour 2026				A second show was added due to high demand.
February 6	Louane	Solo Tour				The show was originally scheduled for May 8, 2025.
February 7	Rilès		Steve Ibrahim			
February 14	Ultra Vomit		Mononc Serge; Anonymus			
February 27	Santa					
February 28	Mika	Spinning out Tour				
March 19	Jean-Baptiste Guégan	Johnny, Le Show d'une Vie				
March 21	Théodora	Méga BBL Tour				The show was sold out in less than 1 minute.
March 25	Jérémy Frérot					
March 28	Kendji Girac	Nos 10 ans Tour				
March 30	Zaz	Zaz Tour 2026				
April 5	Florent Pagny	La Tournée des 65 ans				
April 6	Florent Pagny	La Tournée des 65 ans				
April 7	Florent Pagny	La Tournée des 65 ans				
April 8	Damso	Beyah Tour				
April 9	Damso	Beyah Tour				
April 17	Biglo & Oli	Karma Tour				
April 18	Biglo & Oli	Karma Tour				
April 19	Biglo & Oli	Karma Tour				
May 3	Lorie	Party 2026				
May 6	Amel Bent	Minuit une Tour				
May 9	Vanessa Paradis					
May 14	Biglo & Oli	Karma Tour				
May 15	Biglo & Oli	Karma Tour				
June 26	Kendji Girac	Nos 10 ans Tour				
September 26	Nej	Irréel Tour				
October 1	Djadja & Dinaz					
October 3	Christophe Mae					
October 25	Chantal Goya					
November 6	Joe Bonamassa	2026 Europe Tour				
November 7	Helena					
November 13	PLK	Tour 2026				
November 19	Gaëtan Roussel					
December 2	Disiz	On s'en rappellera Tour				
December 3	Saez					
December 4	Claudio Capeo					
December 16	Feu! Chatterton					
December 29	Various artists	K-Pop Forever!				
2027
February 2	Christophe Mae					
February 26	Hoshi	Bonjour Docteur Tour				
Cancelled shows
November 12, 2003	David Bowie	A Reality Tour	The Dandy Warhols			
March 26, 2020	Niska	Le sal Tour				
April 14, 2020	Kally's Mashup					
January 21, 2026	La Fouine					

== Zénith de Rouen ==
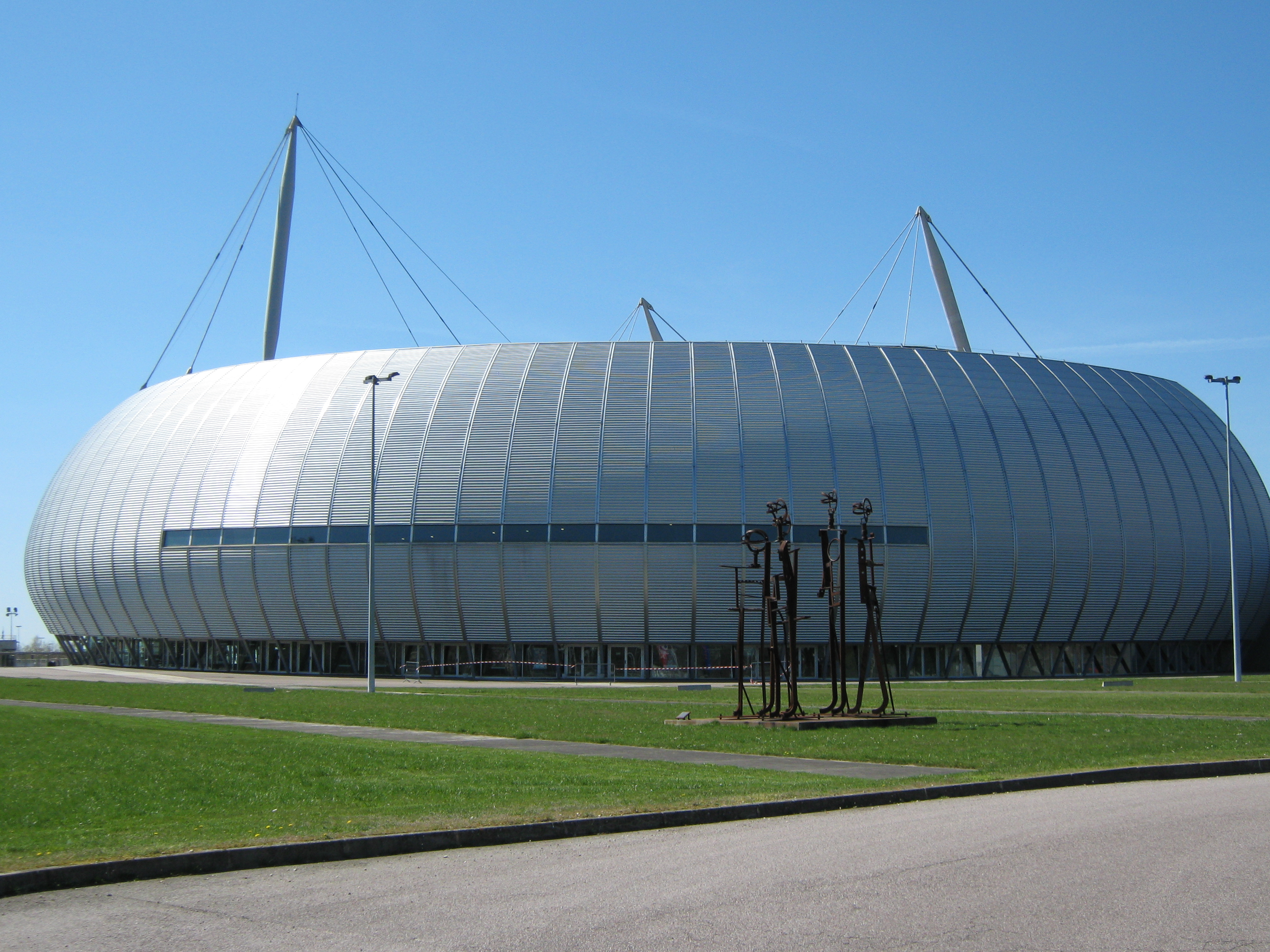
Exterior of Zénith de Rouen

- Address: 4 Avenue des Canadiens 76120 Le Grand-Quevilly, France
- Built: March 3, 2000—January 12, 2001
- Opened: February 25, 2001
- Capacity: 8,000
- Website: Zénith de Rouen Website

The Zénith de Rouen (also known as Zénith de l'Agglo de Rouen) is an indoor arena located in Le Grand-Quevilly, five miles southwest of Rouen. The arena was designed by Swedish architect, Bernard Tschumi in 2001. His designed was honored by the American Institute of Architects. The arena has hosted concerts by Eddy Mitchell, Michel Sardou and Frédéric François.

It is the tenth incarnation of the "Le Zénith" franchise.

== Zénith d'Auvergne ==
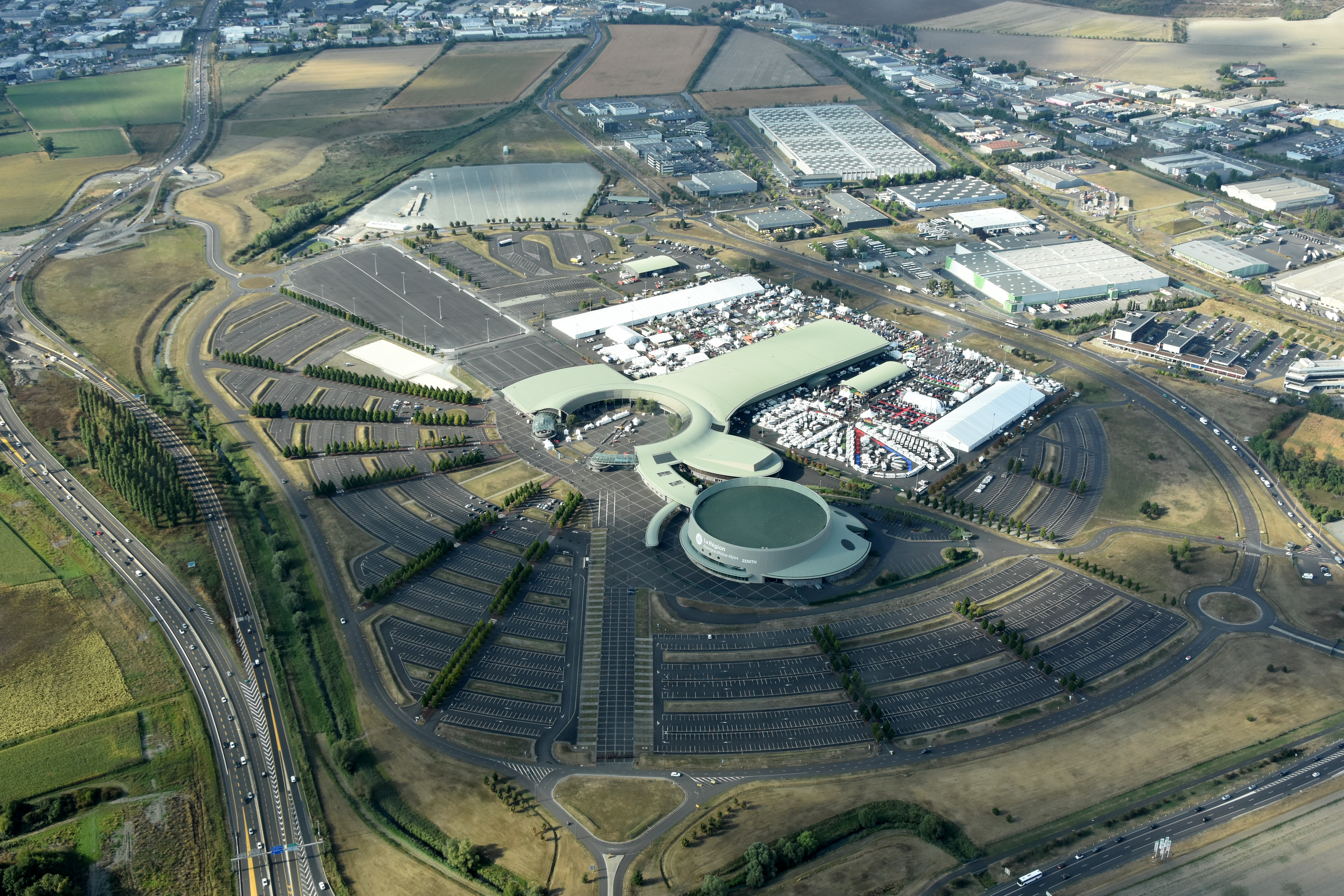
Aerial view of Zénith d'Auvergne

- Address: Rue de Sarliève 63800 Cournon-d'Auvergne, France
- Built: 2003
- Opened: December 2003
- Capacity: 9,400
- Website: Zénith d'Auvergne Website

The Zénith d'Auvergne is indoor arena located in Cournon-d'Auvergne, nearly seven miles east of Clermont-Ferrand. It is located at the Grande Halle d'Auvergne. It was designed by André and Serge Gresy. The building completed construction in October 2003, followed by a concert featuring Johnny Hallyday in December 2003. The venue has hosted the Davis Cup in 2007 and 2010. It was also the site for the Dakar Rally in 2004.

It has hosted concerts by Jean Michel Jarre, Pierre Perret and Yannick Noah, along with stage performances of Dora the Explorer, Lord of the Dance and Scooby-Doo and the Pirate Ghost.

It is the eleventh incarnation of the "Le Zénith" franchise.

== Zénith de Dijon ==
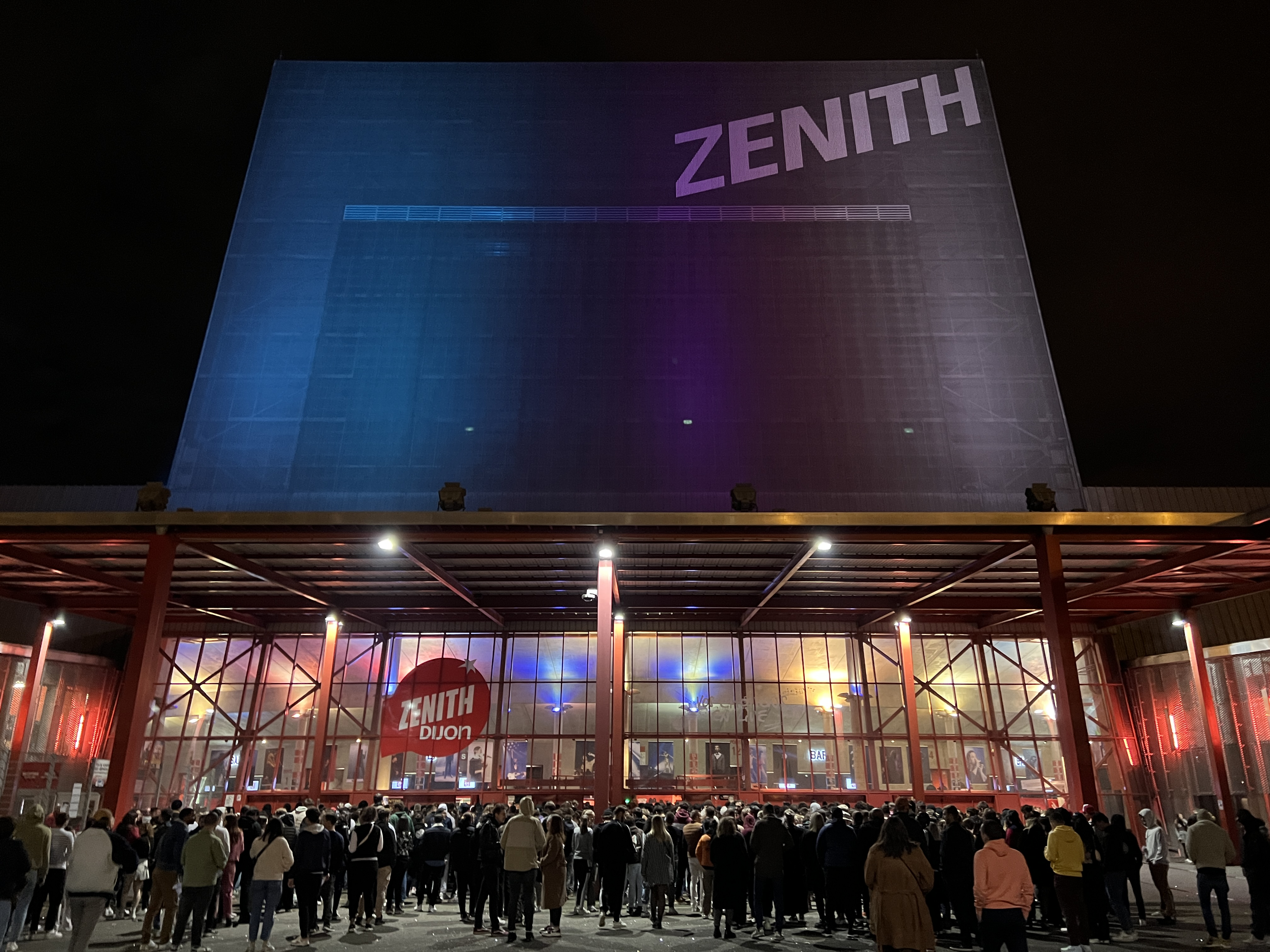
Exterior of Zénith de Dijon

- Address: Allée Colchide 21000 Dijon, France
- Built: 2004—2005
- Opened: October 2005
- Capacity: 7,800
- Website: Zénith de Dijon Website

The Zénith de Dijon (also known as Zénith Dijon) is an indoor arena located within the Parc de la Toison d'Or in Dijon. The venue was designed by Philippe Chaix and Jean-Paul Morel. Construction began October 2004 and was completed in August 2005. The venue opened on October 6, 2005. To celebrate its fifth anniversary, the venue hosted a celebration festival that included a performance by American rock band Santana.

Over the years, the arena has hosted concerts by Sylvie Vartan, Thomas Fersen, Franz Ferdinand, Moby and Joan Baez.

It is the twelfth incarnation of the "Le Zénith" franchise.

== Zénith de Nantes Métropole ==
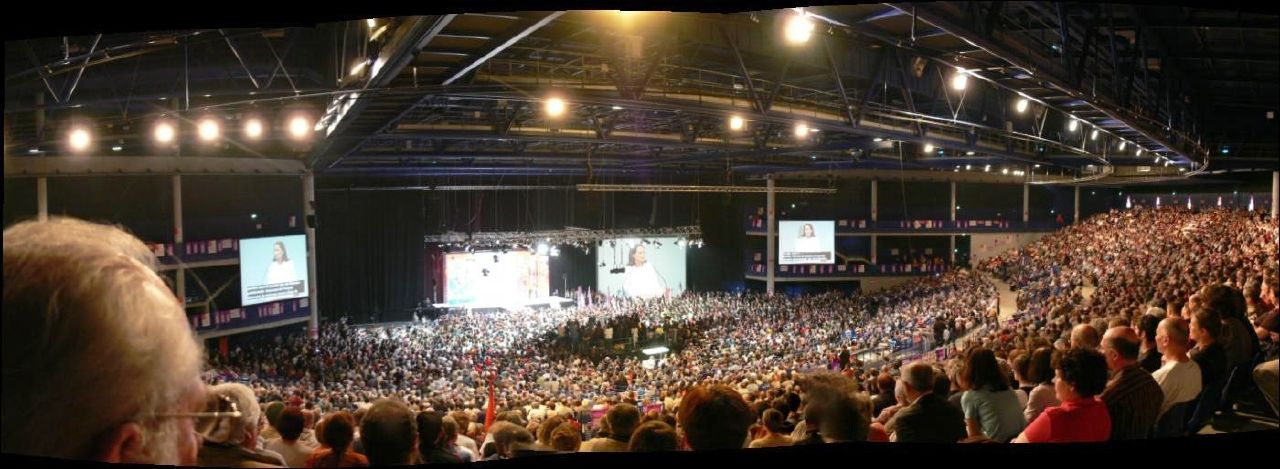
Interior of venue (April 2007)

- Address: ZAC D'ar Mor 44800 St Herblain, France
- Built: 2004—2006
- Opened: December 2006
- Capacity: 8,500
- Website: Zénith de Nantes Métropole Website

The Zénith de Nantes Métropole is an indoor arena in located in Nantes (in the suburb of Saint-Herblain). The arena is located near the Atlantis le Centre. The venue was designed by Phillippe Chaix and Jean-Paul Morel, who have designed several "Le Zénith" arenas. Construction began in 2003 and completed in 2006. Alternative rock band, Placebo became the inaugural event for the venue on December 2, 2006. Since then, the arena has hosted numerous artists including Muse, Sheryl Crow, Linkin Park, Jeff Beck, Simple Plan and Sting.

It is the thirteenth incarnation of the "Le Zénith" franchise.

== Zénith de Limoges ==
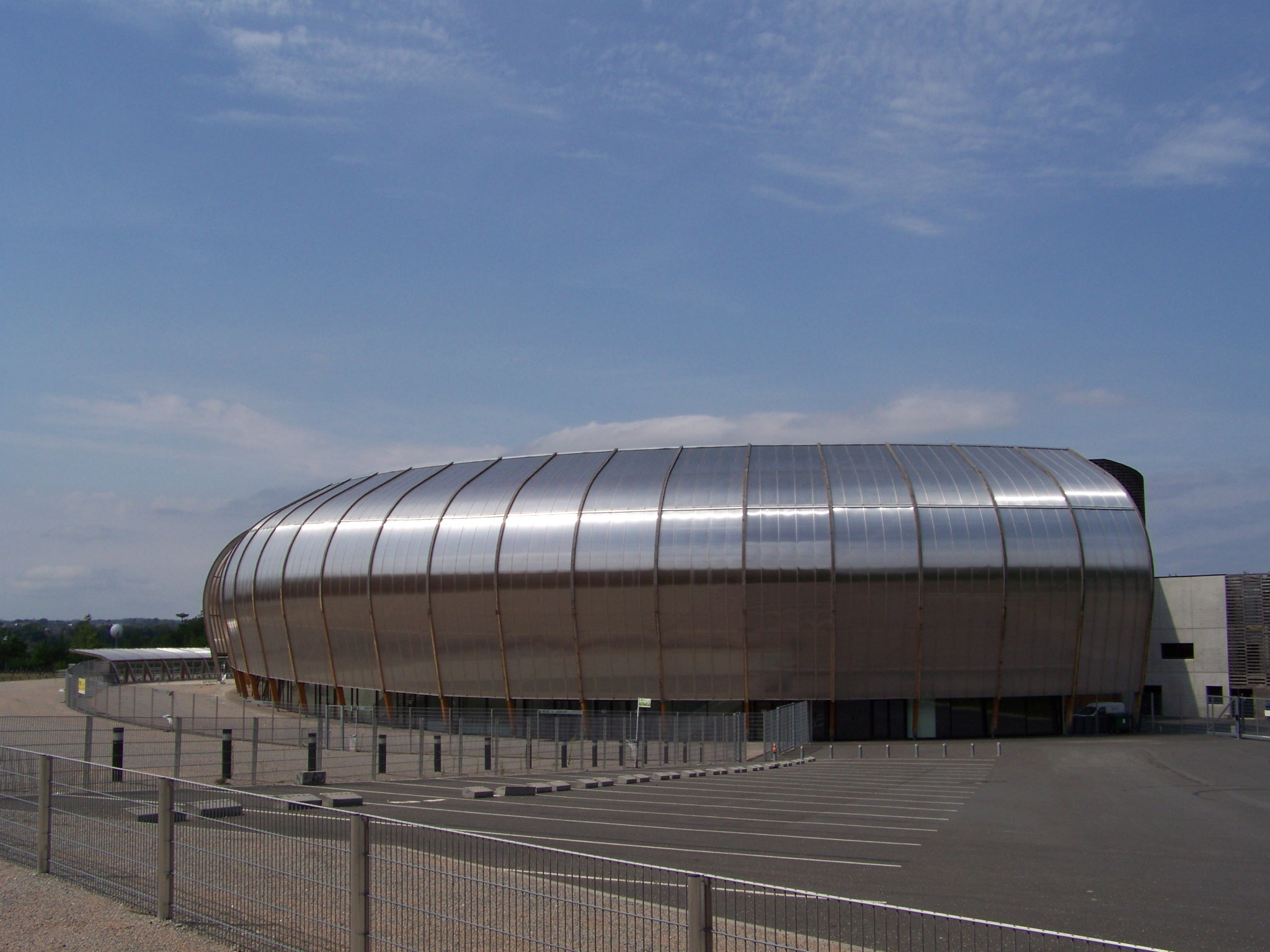
Exterior of venue

- Address: 16, Avenue Jean Monnet 87100, Limoges, France
- Built: 2005—2007
- Opened: March 2007
- Capacity: 6,000
- Website: Zénith de Limoges Website

The Zénith de Limoges (also known as Zénith de Limoges Métropole) is an indoor arena located in Limoges. The venue was designed by Bernard Tschumi, who also designed the Zénith de Rouen. The arena was originally proposed in 1995 to be included in Limoges Métropole. Construction was pushed back until 2005 due to funding. The first brick was laid on April 8, 2005. The building features a unique exterior feature that displays several douglas-fir surrounded in a polycarbonate shell. The venue opened on March 17, 2007, with a concert by Michel Polnareff. Since its opening, the arena has hosted events by Patrick Bruel, Pascal Obispo and Joan Baez.

It is the fourteenth incarnation of the "Le Zénith" franchise.

== Zénith de Strasbourg ==
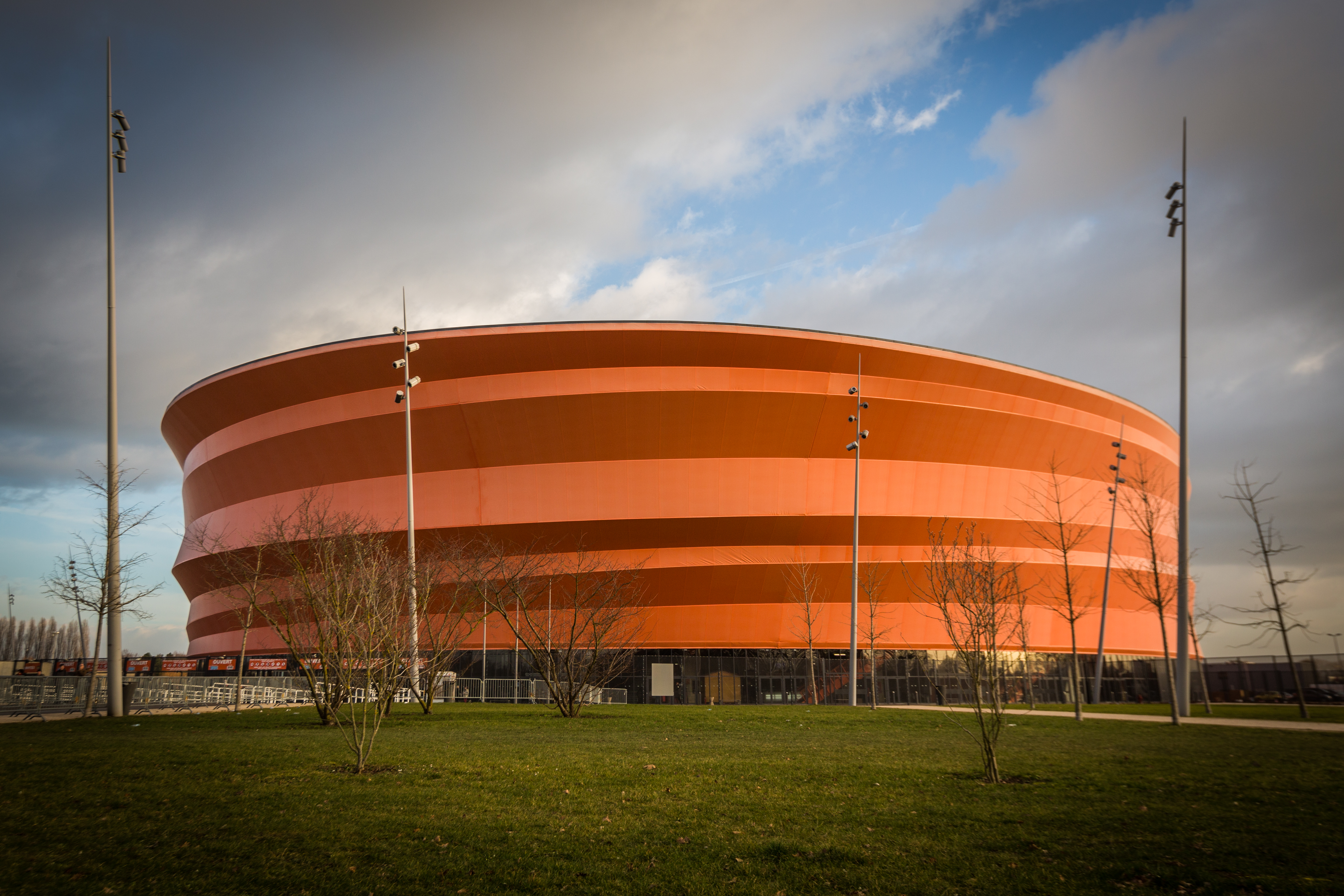
Zénith de Strasbourg illuminated at night.

- Address: BP 84097 Eckbolsheim 1 allée du Zénith, 67034 Strasbourg Cedex 2, France
- Built: 2006—2007
- Opened: January 2008
- Capacity: ~12,100
- Website: Zénith de Strasbourg Website

The Zénith de Strasbourg (also known as Zénith Europe) is an indoor arena located in Eckbolsheim, three miles west of Strasbourg. The venue began construction in January 2006 and ended in December 2007. The venue was designed by famed Italian architect, Massimiliano Fuksas. The exterior of the building was meant to mimic the lantern of Aladdin. On opening night, the venue hosted several free concerts from local bands in Strasbourg.

The first event held at the arena was "W9VIP Live" on January 9, 2009. The event was organized by French television stations W9 and M6 to commemorate Télévision Numérique Terrestre (digital television in France). The concert contained performances by Alizée Jacotey, Amel Bent, Emma Bunton, Christophe Maé, Jenifer Bartoli, Laure Pester, Melissa M and Les Déesses.

The venue has hosted many artists including: Coldplay, Beyoncé Knowles, Guns N' Roses, Lady Gaga, Depeche Mode and Elton John. It has also hosted WWE Smackdown and Festival des Artefacts.

It is the fifteenth incarnation of the "Le Zénith" franchise.

== Zénith d'Amiens ==
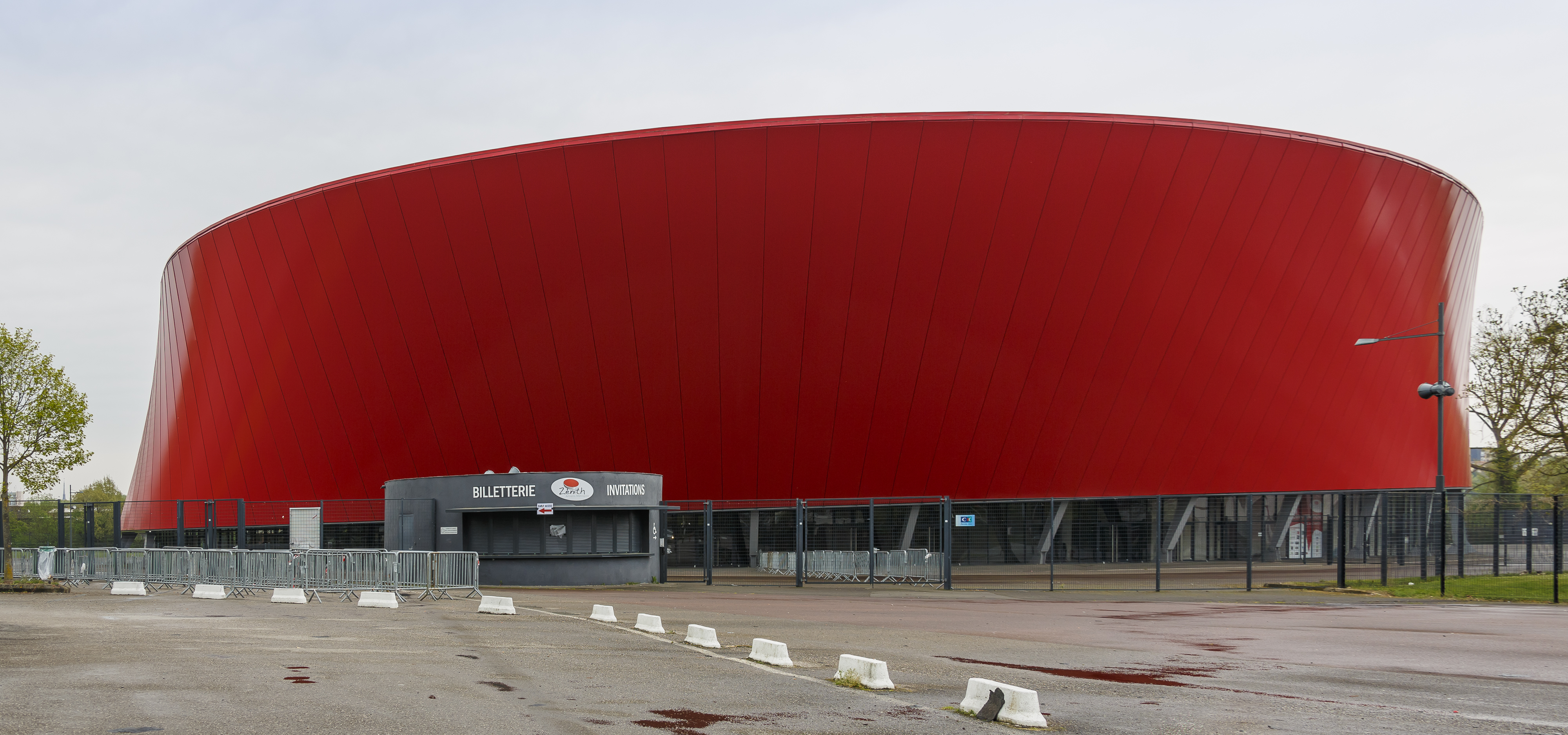
Exterior view of Zénith d'Amiens

- Address: impasse de l'Hippodrome 80000 Amiens, France
- Built: 2006—2008
- Opened: September 2008
- Capacity: 6,000
- Website: Zénith d'Amiens Website

The Zénith d'Amiens (also known as SAS Zénith Amiens Métropole) is an indoor arena located in Amiens near the Stade de la Licorne and Hippodrome d'Amiens. The venue was designed by famed Italian architect, Massimiliano Fuksas. Construction began in May 2006 and was completed in July 2008. The arena was to be completed in November 2007 but was stalled an additional eight months due to financing. The arena conveys a smiler design to Zénith de Strasbourg, completed only seven months earlier. It opened on September 27, 2008, with a free concert by Arno Elias, Rokia Traoré and Keziah Jones.

Artists to have played the venue include Marc Anthony, Lara Fabian, Christophe Maé, Nicolas Canteloup and Pascal Obispo

It is the sixteenth incarnation of the "Le Zénith" franchise.

== Zénith de Saint-Étienne ==
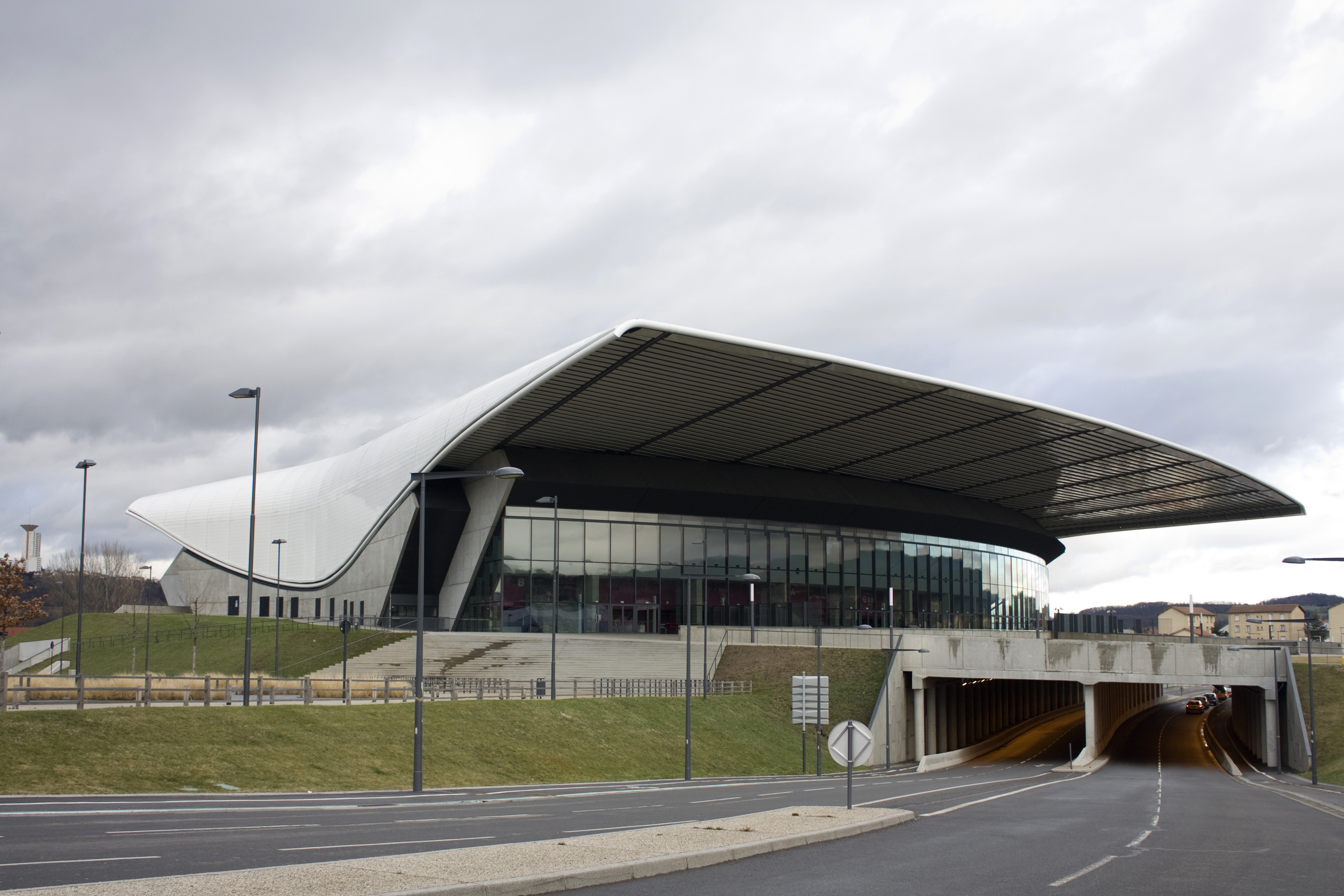
Exterior of venue

- Address: Rue Scheurer-Kestner 42000 Saint-Étienne, France
- Built: 2006—2008
- Opened: October 2008
- Capacity: 7,200
- Website: Zénith de Saint-Étienne Website

The Zénith de Saint-Étienne (also known as Zénith de Saint-Étienne Métropole) is an indoor arena located in Saint-Étienne, near Stade Geoffroy-Guichard. Construction began in September 2006 and was designed by Norman Foster. The building has an aluminium roof that is designed to capture winds, acting as a natural ventilation. The arena opened October 10, 2008, with a concert by Johnny Hallyday for fr:Tour 66. The venue has hosted concerts by Bernard Lavilliers, Jean Michel Jarre and Michel Sardou.

It is the seventeenth incarnation of the "Le Zénith" franchise.

== See also ==
- Zenith (disambiguation)
- List of indoor arenas in France
