= North Australian Basin =

Oceanic basin in the Indian Ocean

Coordinates: 14°30′S 116°30′E

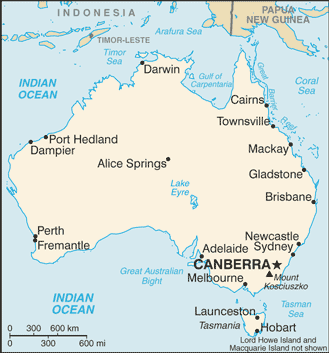
NAB is in the Indian Ocean off Northwest Australia

Wharton Basin

The North Australian Basin (NAB; formerly Argo Abyssal Plain, or Argo Plain) is an oceanic basin in the easternmost corner of the Indian Ocean between northwest Australia and Indonesia. It was discovered by the U.S. research vessel "Argo" of the Scripps Institution of Oceanography in 1960. It should be distinguished from an Australian sedimentary basin with the same name.

It bounds the Australian continental margin in the area of its northwestern shelf. From the north, east, south and southwest it is respectively bounded by the Java Trench, the submerged continental crust of the Scott Plateau, Rowley Terrace, and the Exmouth Planeau with the Wombat Plateau. To the west it is separated from the Gascoyne Abyssal Plain by the Joey and Roo Rises (Note: Roo Rise: Latitude 12° 39' 44" S (-12.66222726°) Longitude 110° 23' 4.7" E (110.3846496°)) north of the Platypus Spur.

The floor of the basin has an area of 160,000 square kilometers.

It has been suggested that the opening of the Argo Abyssal Plain was due to the rifting of a continental sliver off the passive margin of northeastern Gondwana in the Late Jurassic.

== See also ==
- Argoland
- Wharton Basin
