= FC Zenit (disambiguation) =

FC Zenit may refer to:

- FC Zenit Saint Petersburg, a Russian football club
  - FC Zenit-2, reserve team of Zenit Saint Petersburg
- FC Zenit Penza, a Russian football club
- FC Zenit-Izhevsk Izhevsk, a Russian football club
- FC Chelyabinsk, a Russian football club formerly known as FC Zenit Chelyabinsk
- FK Čáslav, a Czech football club formerly known as FC Zenit Čáslav

== See also ==
- Zenit (disambiguation)
