= Wallaby Plateau =

Undersea bathymetric high west of Australia

Coordinates: 24°18′S 108°24′E

The Wallaby Plateau, which is also known as the Cuvier Plateau, is a large bathymetric high about 450 kilometres (280 mi) west of Carnarvon, Western Australia. The Wallaby Plateau covers approximately 100,000 km^{2} (39,000 sq mi) and is in water depths of 2,200 meters (7,200 ft) to greater than 5,000 meters (16,000 ft). In the west, the Wallaby Plateau is separated from the Zenith Plateau by a 100–150-kilometre (62–93 mi) wide, north to northeast-trending bathymetric trough. Wallaby Plateau is the name used by the Australian geologists and government for this undersea plateau. This name was first used in a Hartog AGSO bathymetric map and formally recognized in a peer-reviewed paper by Symonds and Cameron in 1977. In contrast, the internationally recognized name for it is Cuvier Plateau. Cuvier is a historical name that is presumably derived from the adjacent Cape Cuvier. Cape Cuvier was named for Georges Cuvier, zoologist and statesman, by a French expedition led by Baudin in 1800–1803. The Wallaby Plateau lies inside the Australian Exclusive Economic Zone.

The Wallaby Plateau largely lies within Australia's extended continental shelf. It apparently consists of attenuated continental crust which is buried beneath a thick sequence of volcanic rocks that are blanketed by marine sediments.

== Origins ==
The origins of the Wallaby Plateau date back 130 million years ago during the break up of the Australian and Greater India plates. With the help of seismic reflection and geodynamic reconstruction data, evidence was published to support the origin of the area back to the development of the lithospheric-scale Wallaby–Zenith Fracture Zone during the breakup of the two continental plates. Additionally, even earlier studies of the region attributed the formation of this area to large-scale volcanic activity on the oceanic crust.

== Studies ==
A recent study of the plateau conducted in 2008–2009 by Geoscience Australia surveyed 65,000 square kilometers of the area to gain a broader geologic understanding. A multibeam swath bathymetry along with 8000 line kilometers of high-resolution gravity, magnetic and Acoustic Doppler Current Profiler measurements were collected along with several rock and sediment samples. A total of eleven rock dredges, three sediment grabs, four box cores, one sea floor trawl, eight camera and temperature tows, conductivity (salinity) and depth profiles through the water column. Data from this survey revealed and reaffirmed early studies that volcanic activity was a major factor in the early formations of this vast plateau. Along with three large volcano complexes, and two other small and steeper cone-shaped complexes, several valleys, scarps, and ridges were discovered as well as a new seafloor. Additionally, on the northeast of the plateau, what researchers believe are volcanic hills, were discovered from the bathymetry data from the survey.

== Survey Samples ==
A total of ten samples of sedimentary rocks, 14 volcanic rock samples, and an additional seven samples with mineral development were collected with the help of various geologic tools. Rock samples collected during the survey were predominantly igneous and also siliceous in nature, thus supporting the notion once more of the volcanic origins of the Wallaby Plateau. Terrigenous clastic rocks were also recovered providing primitive evidence of sediment deposits when the plateau was at or above sea level. From the sediment rock samples collected researchers determined that a poorly sorted “ooze” comprises a large part of the seafloor sediments on the Plateau.
