= J. P. Nataf =

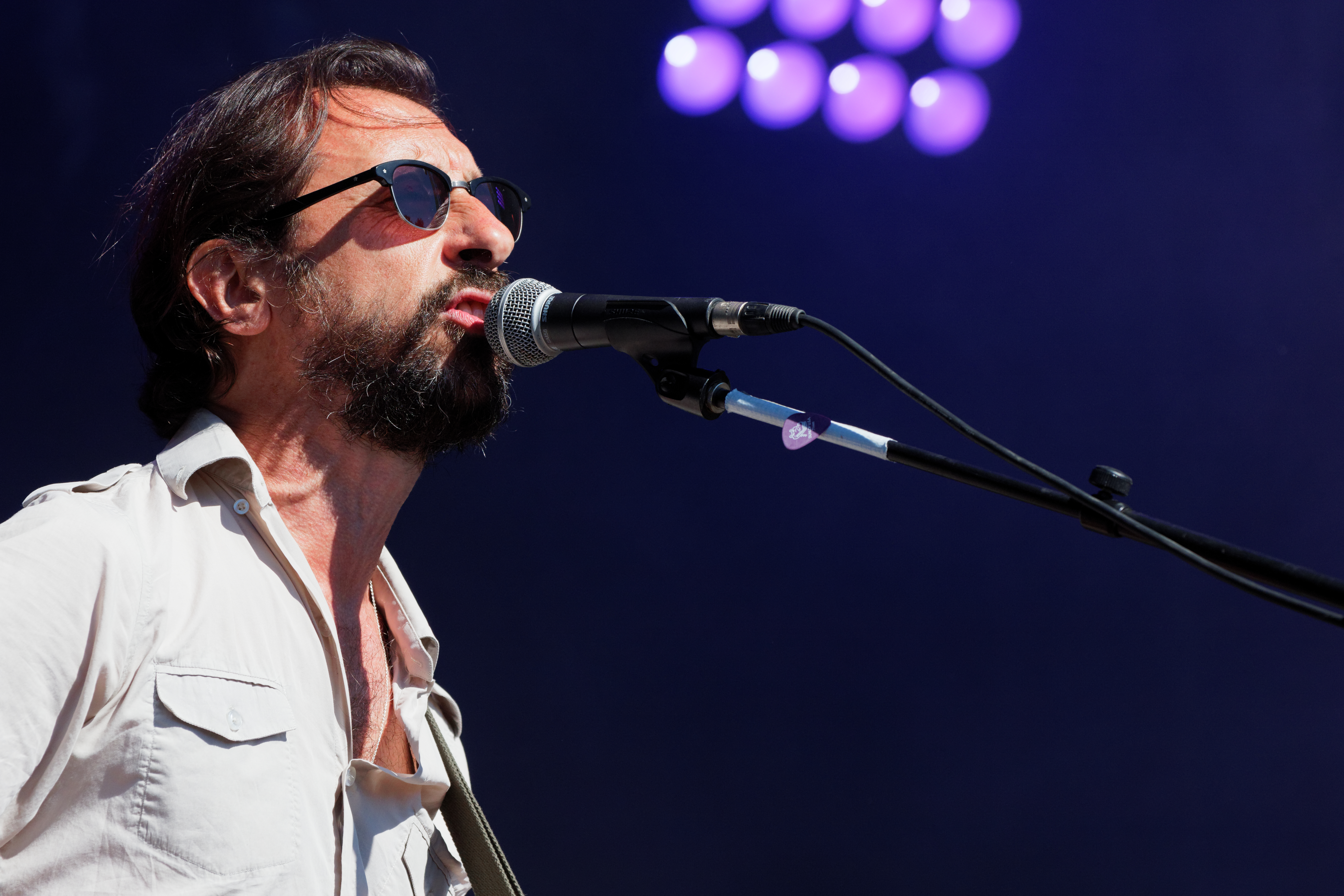
- J. P. Nataf performing with Les Innocents on the stage of the Festival du bout du monde in August 2016

Background information
- Born: Jean-Philippe Nataf; July 14, 1962 (age 63); Boulogne-Billancourt (France)
- Occupations: Singer-songwriter, guitarist
- Years active: Since 1982
- Website: www.jpnataf.fr

Jean-Philippe Nataf, also known as J. P. Nataf or Jipé Nataf, is a French singer-songwriter and guitarist born on 14 July 1962, in Boulogne-Billancourt.

== Biography ==
Passionate about music, particularly The Beatles, J.P. Nataf is the singer, guitarist, and composer of the group Les Innocents (which also includes Jean-Christophe Urbain). They achieved success in the late 1980s with the title Jodie, which sold 150,000 copies.

He co-wrote the albums Fous à lier and Post-partum. He has also collaborated extensively, notably with singer Jil Caplan. He owns his own recording studio in Paris.

In 2005, with Jeanne Cherhal, he created the group Red Legs where, wearing long red socks (which give their name to the duo), they perform covers of classic songs. Jeanne Cherhal plays the bass and J.P. Nataf plays the guitar. The Red Legs have not recorded an album; their official discography under the name Red Legs consists of one song on a tribute disk to Dick Annegarn.

In 2004, Plus de sucre received critical acclaim but had moderate public success.

J.P. Nataf composed Du soleil dans ma rue for Hubert-Félix Thiéfaine, released on 11 June 2021. Géographie du vide was released on 8 October 2021, for Eddy Mitchell.

In 2007, he collaborated with Olivier Libaux on the project Imbécile, a mix of theater and song, and performed in its stage adaptation directed by Olivier Martinaud, alongside Bertrand Belin, Armelle Pioline, and Barbara Carlotti.

In 2009, he released his second solo album Clair, which was very well received by the critics.

He participated with Jean-Christophe Urbain in the film Pop Redemption. On 13 February 2013, Acoustic, the TV5Monde show, celebrated its 10th anniversary. For this occasion, Nataf sang Un jour sans erreur with Albin de la Simone, Vincent Delerm, and Mathieu Boogaerts, reunited for the first time on television.

In 2013, he reformed Les Innocents with Jean-Christophe Urbain and embarked on a 12-date tour, including a performance in Brussels at the Place des Palais during the Brussels Summer Festival. On 13 March 2015, the group officially released its new single Les Philharmonies martiennes on its official website and Facebook page. On 1 June 2015, Mandarine, the album by the reconstituted duo, was released and well received by critics.

On 12 February 2016, the group won a Victoire de la Musique award in the "best rock album" category.

== Private life ==
J.P. Nataf is the father of two boys, Joseph and Abel. He is divorced.

== Discography ==
=== With Les Innocents ===
- 1987: Jodie (45 tours)
- 1989: Cent Mètres Au Paradis
- 1989: Les Innocents chantent Noël (covers EP)
- 1992: Fous à lier
- 1995: Post-partum
- 1999: Les Innocents
- 2003: Meilleurs souvenirs (compilation)
- 2015: Mandarine
- 2019: 6 1/2

=== Solo ===
- 2004 : Plus de sucre
- 2009 : Clair
- 2012: Soundtrack to the film Je me suis fait tout petit

=== In compilations ===
- 2009 : Tout doux on Songs over troubled water, a compilation of songs chosen by Dominique A
- I want you with the Wantones, on a compilation of songs all sharing this title

== Collaborations ==
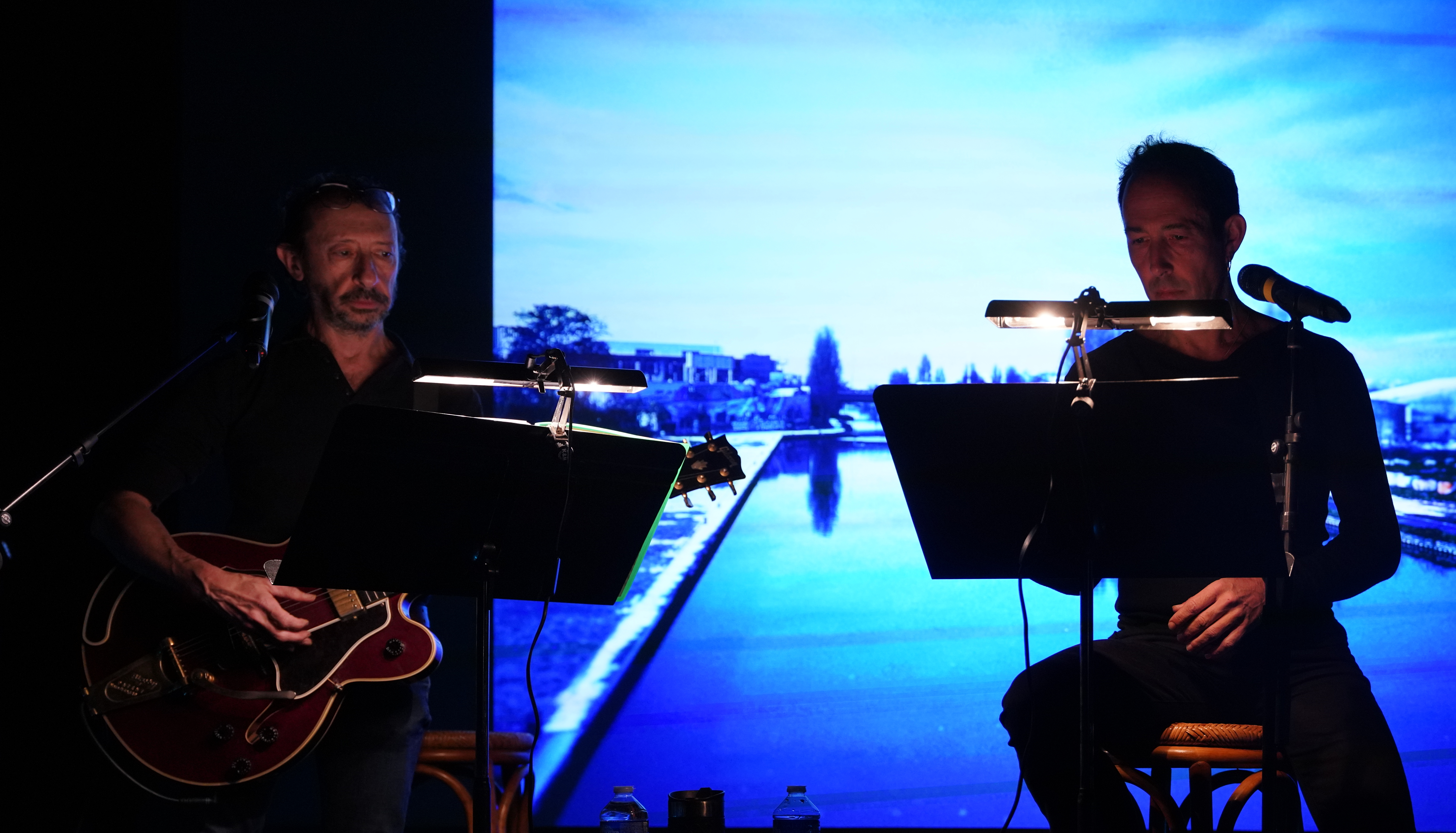
Music performance with Thomas B. Reverdy.

- Dolorès (1996) by Jean-Louis Murat. JP Nataf participates in the backing vocals for the song Saint-Amant.
- Mercedes Audras (1996), JP Nataf contributes to the arrangements and compositions of songs like Mon Ange and Adonde with Jean-Christophe Urbain.
- Quelque chose d'organique (1998), soundtrack for Bertrand Bonello's film by the group Laurie Markovitch (JP Nataf, Bertrand Bonello, Mirwais).
- Toute crue (2001) by Jil Caplan. JP Nataf composes all the music, including one with Jil Caplan. He arranges and produces the album with Pascal Colomb.
- T'choupi (2004), soundtrack for Jean-Luc François's film. JP Nataf writes the music (and co-writes the lyrics) for two songs: Ma théorie and Ma copine l'amitié.
- On Dirait Nino (2005), tribute album to Nino Ferrer. Covers the song "Oh! Hé! Hein! Bon!"
- Tôt ou tard (2005), a duets album from Tôt ou Tard. Songs include Demain demain with Mathieu Boogaerts and Bombes 2 bal, Escobar with Thomas Fersen and Floricanto with Agnès Jaoui.
- Scandale mélancolique (2005) by Hubert-Félix Thiéfaine. JP Nataf writes the music for Confessions d'un never been and plays acoustic guitar.
- Le grand Dîner (2006), tribute album to Dick Annegarn. Covers Quelle belle vallée in a duo with Jeanne Cherhal and Le saule.
- Jambalaya (2006) by Eddy Mitchell. JP Nataf writes the music for Le seul survivant.
- Imbécile (2007) by Olivier Libaux. JP Nataf plays the role of René.
- Quinze Chansons (2008) by Vincent Delerm. JP Nataf plays guitar on Dans tes bras.
- On n'est pas là pour se faire engueuler ! (2009), tribute album to Boris Vian. Balade du lapin
- 10 000 km (2010) duet on Mercedes Audras's new album. JP Nataf sings with Mercedes on a song composed by Jean-Louis Piérot, Ton apparence éclair.
- Guest at Malicorne concert during the Francofolies de la Rochelle in 2010, he performs Quand je menai mes chevaux boire with the group (performance available on the concert DVD).
- En 2021, il chante he sings a duet onL'homme heureux on the album Padre Padrone, Nicolas Paugam's fifth album.
