= Je m'en vais =

Single by Vianney

from the album Vianney
- Released: 17 October 2016
- Recorded: 2015
- Genre: French pop
- Length: 3:17
- Label: Tôt ou Tard
- Songwriter: Vianney
- Producer: Vianney

Vianney singles chronology
"On est bien comme ça" (2015)	"Je m'en vais" (2016)	"Moi aimer toi" (2017)

Music video
- "Je m'en vais" on YouTube

"Je m'en vais" is a song by French singer Vianney released on 17 October 2016, under the label Tôt ou tard. The music video was released on 7 November 2016.

== Music video ==
A music video for the song was released onto YouTube on 7 November 2016 at a total length of three minutes and fourteen seconds.

== Track listing ==
Digital download
No.	Title	Length
1.	"Je m'en vais"	3:18

== Charts ==
=== Weekly charts ===
Chart (2016–2017)	Peak position
Belgium (Ultratop 50 Flanders)	33
Belgium (Ultratop 50 Wallonia)	3
France (SNEP)	2
Switzerland (Schweizer Hitparade)	48

=== Year-end charts ===
Chart (2017)	Position
Belgium (Ultratop Wallonia)	9
France (SNEP)	16

== Release history ==
Region	Date	Format	Label
France	17 October 2016	Digital download	Tôt ou tard
