= Vianney =

Vianney may refer to:

== Persons ==
=== Surname ===
- John Vianney (1786–1859), French parish priest who is venerated in the Catholic Church as a saint and as the patron saint of all priests. Because of his fame, his name has been given to several places in Quebec, and his surname has become a French first name.

=== Given name ===
- Vianney (singer), French singer-songwriter
- Vianney Décarie, Canadian philosopher
- Vyanney Guyonnet, member of the French super vocal group Les Stentors
- Vianney Mabidé (born 1988), Central African football (soccer) player

== Places ==
- Vianney, Quebec, a former municipality that merged into Saint-Ferdinand, Quebec in 2000
- Saint-Vianney, Quebec, municipality in Quebec, Canada
- Saint-Jean-Vianney, former village in the Saguenay-Lac-Saint-Jean region of Quebec, now abandoned after it was partially destroyed in a landslide in 1971

== Other uses ==
- Vianney (album)

== See ==
- Vianne
