= Égérie =

Égérie is the French spelling of the nymph Egeria. It may also refer to:

- Égérie, French corvette Départment des Landes
- Égérie, correspondence of Henri-Frédéric Amiel

== Music ==
- Égérie, a 1997 album by Silvain Vanot

=== Songs ===
- "L'Égérie", song by François Audrain
- "Pop Égérie O", song by Étienne Daho
- "L'Égérie", song by Gérard Darmon
- "Égérie" (song), a 2015 song by Nekfeu
- "Égérie", song by Silvain Vanot
