= Le concert (Vianney album) =

Live album by Vianney
- Released: 9 November 2018
- Recorded: 2017–18
- Label: Tôt ou tard

Vianney chronology
Vianney (2016)	Le concert (2018)	N'attendons pas (2020)

Singles from Vianney
- 1. "La même" Released: 9 March 2018; 2. "Chanson sur ma drôle de vie" Released: 14 September 2018

Le concert is the first live album from French singer-songwriter Vianney. It was released on 9 November 2018 by Tôt ou tard. The album includes the singles "La même" and "Chanson sur ma drôle de vie". The album has peaked at number 11 on the French Albums Chart.

== Singles ==
"La même" was released as the lead single from the album on 9 March 2018. The song has peaked at number 1 on the French Singles Chart, the song has also charted in Belgium and Switzerland. "Chanson sur ma drôle de vie" was released as the second single from the album on 14 September 2018.

== Track listing ==
Disk One
No.	Title	Length
1.	"Sans le dire" (Live)	4:58
2.	"Veronica" (Live)	4:16
3.	"Quand je serai père" (Live)	8:30
4.	"J'm'en fous" (Live)	4:32
5.	"Les gens sont méchants" (Live)	7:49
6.	"Dumbo" (Live)	4:10
7.	"Je te déteste" (Live)	6:49
8.	"Le fils à papa" (Live)	9:01
9.	"Pas là" (Live)	3:58
10.	"L'homme et l'âme" (Live)	7:36
11.	"Je m'en vais" (Live)	3:50
12.	"La même" (Live)	5:13
13.	"Le Galopin" (Live)	6:11

Disk Two
No.	Title	Length
1.	"J'ai oublié de vivre" (Live aux Studios Saint-Germain)	4:42
2.	"Caroline" (Live aux Studios Saint-Germain)	3:35
3.	"Ma force" (Live aux Studios Saint-Germain)	3:29
4.	"Puisque tu pars" (Live aux Studios Saint-Germain)	5:28
5.	"Quand j'étais chanteur"	3:40
6.	"Si on chantait"	3:14
7.	"Turn your lights down low"	4:00
8.	"La même" (with Maître Gims)	3:20
9.	"Chanson sur ma drôle de vie" (with Véronique Sanson)	2:37
10.	"Allez reste" (with Boulevard des Airs)	3:09
11.	"Les filles d'aujourd'hui" (with Joyce Jonathan)	4:22
12.	"Rive Gauche"	3:39
13.	"Un peu de ton amour"	3:16

== Charts ==
=== Weekly charts ===
Chart (2018)	Peak position
Belgian Albums (Ultratop Wallonia)	27
French Albums (SNEP)	11
Swiss Albums (Schweizer Hitparade)	33

=== Year-end charts ===
Chart (2018)	Position
Belgian Albums (Ultratop Wallonia)	150
French Albums (SNEP)	118

== Certifications ==
Region	Certification	Certified units/sales
France (SNEP)	Gold	50,000^{‡}
^{‡} Sales+streaming figures based on certification alone.

== Release history ==
Region	Date	Format	Label
France	9 November 2018	Digital download; CD	Tôt ou tard
