= Constance Amiot =

French writer-composer-performer (born 1978)

Constance Amiot (born 1978) is a French writer-composer-performer of songs in French and English in an acoustic pop-folk style.

Born to French parents in Abidjan in the Ivory Coast, she grew up in Cameroon and the United States, settling in Paris in 2000. She began her music career as a pianist in a rock group named Virus that performed cover versions of Guns N' Roses songs, all the while pursuing her studies in law, literature and sound engineering. She adopted the guitar as her instrument of preference, influenced by artists like Tracy Chapman.

After a first self-produced album Whisperwood (2003), she next recorded an album in New York called Fairytale, (April 2007 on the Tôt ou tard label), with the participation of Jeff Pevar, Ben Wisch, Sean Pelton, François Moutin and the contribution of some lyrics by Jérôme Attal.

== Biography ==
Born to French parents in Abidjan, Ivory Coast, she grew up in Cameroon and then in the United States. She began her career in Maryland with a rock band called Virus. She then moved to France at the age of 22.

In 2005, she self-produced her first album, Whisperwood, which led to her being signed by the Tôt ou Tard label in 2006.

She then recorded her album, Fairytale (2007), in New York. This was followed by a European tour that included numerous festivals.

Constance Amiot has been involved in numerous projects, including writing and producing À la bonne étoile, a children's book and CD narrated by Sanseverino (2009), and Once Twice, an English adaptation of Da Silva (singer) album La Tendresse des fous (2011).

In 2012, she recorded an EP, Blue Green Tomorrows which would serve as the basis for her fourth album, the colorful pop-folk 12e Parallèle, released in 2014.

== Discography ==
- Whisperwood (2005)
- Fairytale (2007), Tôt ou tard/Warner
- Once Twice (2011), Tôt Ou Tard / Warner
- Blue Green Tomorrows EP (2012), Believe Digital
- 12ème Parallèle (2014), Believe Digital
- After Summer (2025), Faille Hit
