= Thomas Fersen =

French singer-songwriter

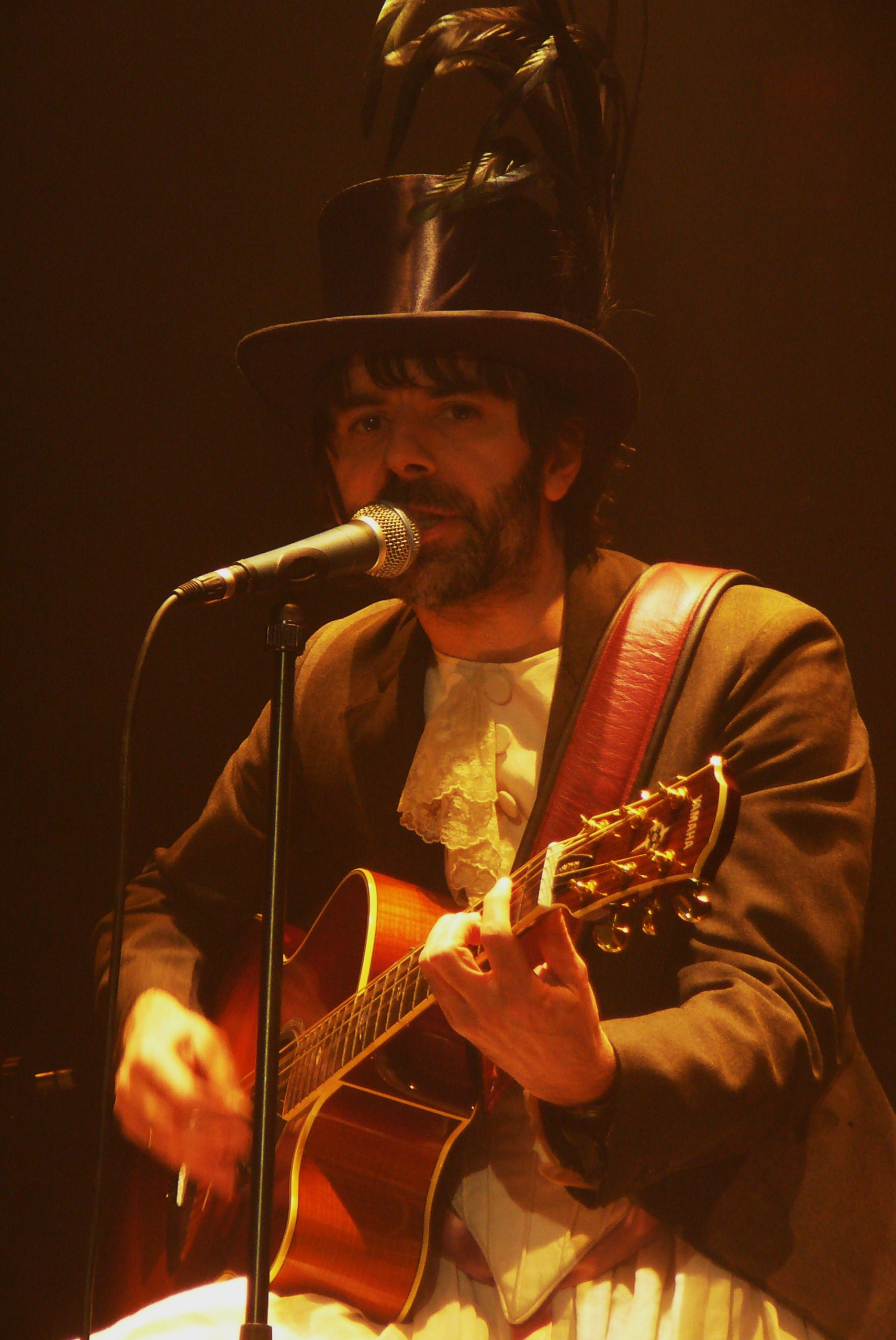

Background information
- Born: 4 January 1963 (age 63)
- Origin: Paris, France
- Occupation: singer-songwriter

Thomas Fersen (born 4 January 1963 in Paris) is a French singer-songwriter.

During his childhood, he was part of a punk group before playing the piano in café-theatres. He released his first album in 1993; it gave him immediate name recognition.

Fersen is an accomplished poet who regularly plays with language, using puns, rich rhymes, symbols and images taken from the realms of plants (vegetables and fruits) and animals (birds and various beasts) to tell stories or original fables, to recreate moments from daily life, impressions and sentiments, and also the dreams of ordinary people and their failings and faults. His deep and gravelly smoker's voice gives a particular tone to his songs, which belong to different musical styles depending on the album (rock, folk-rock or jazz and blues).

The stage name "Thomas Fersen" comes from the names of Tomas Boy, a Mexican footballer, and Hans-Axel de Fersen, Marie-Antoinette's Swedish lover.

He was one of the first singers to join the label Tôt ou tard.

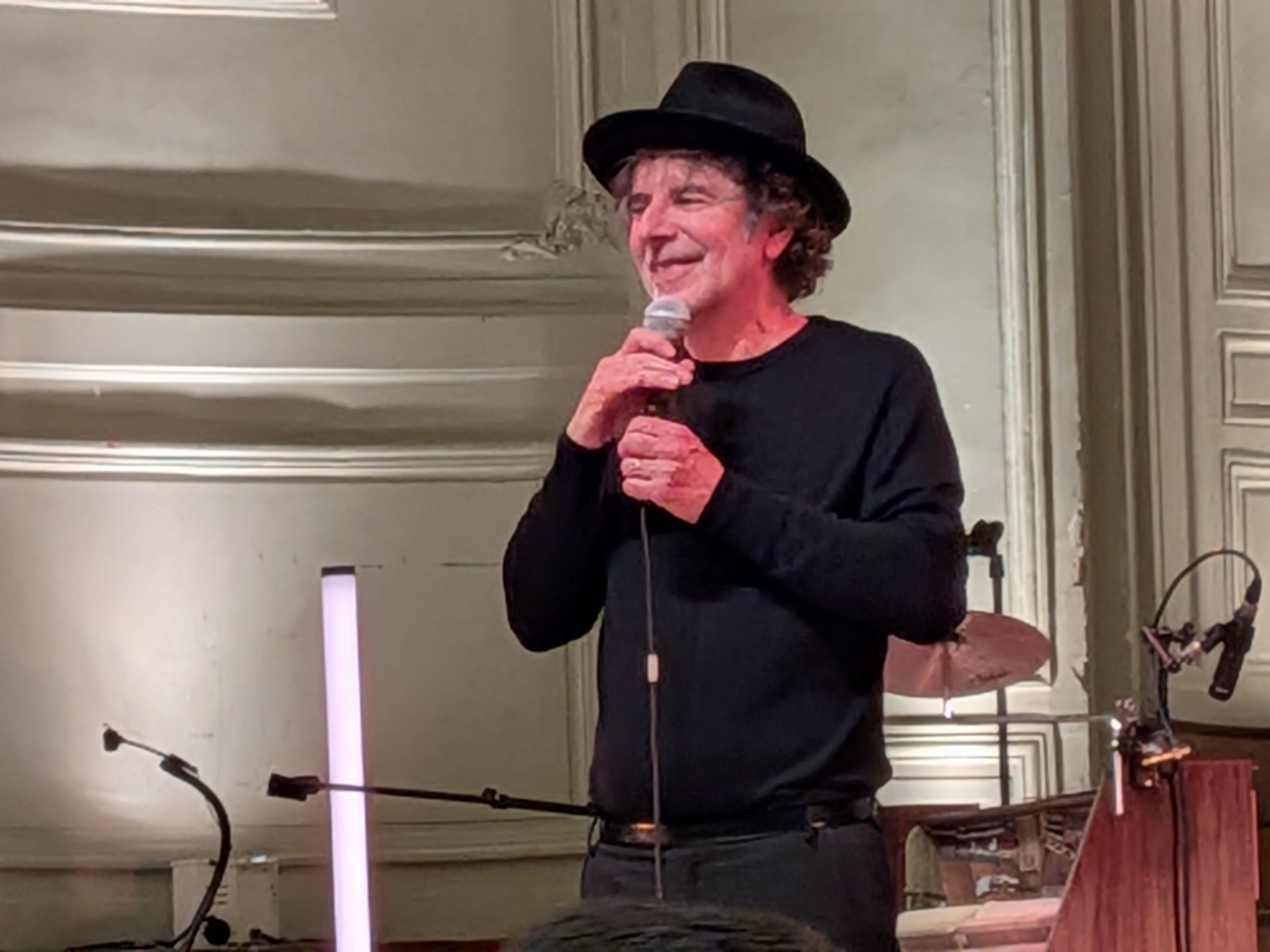
Thomas Fersen on stage at the salle Gaveau in Paris on 01/17/2026

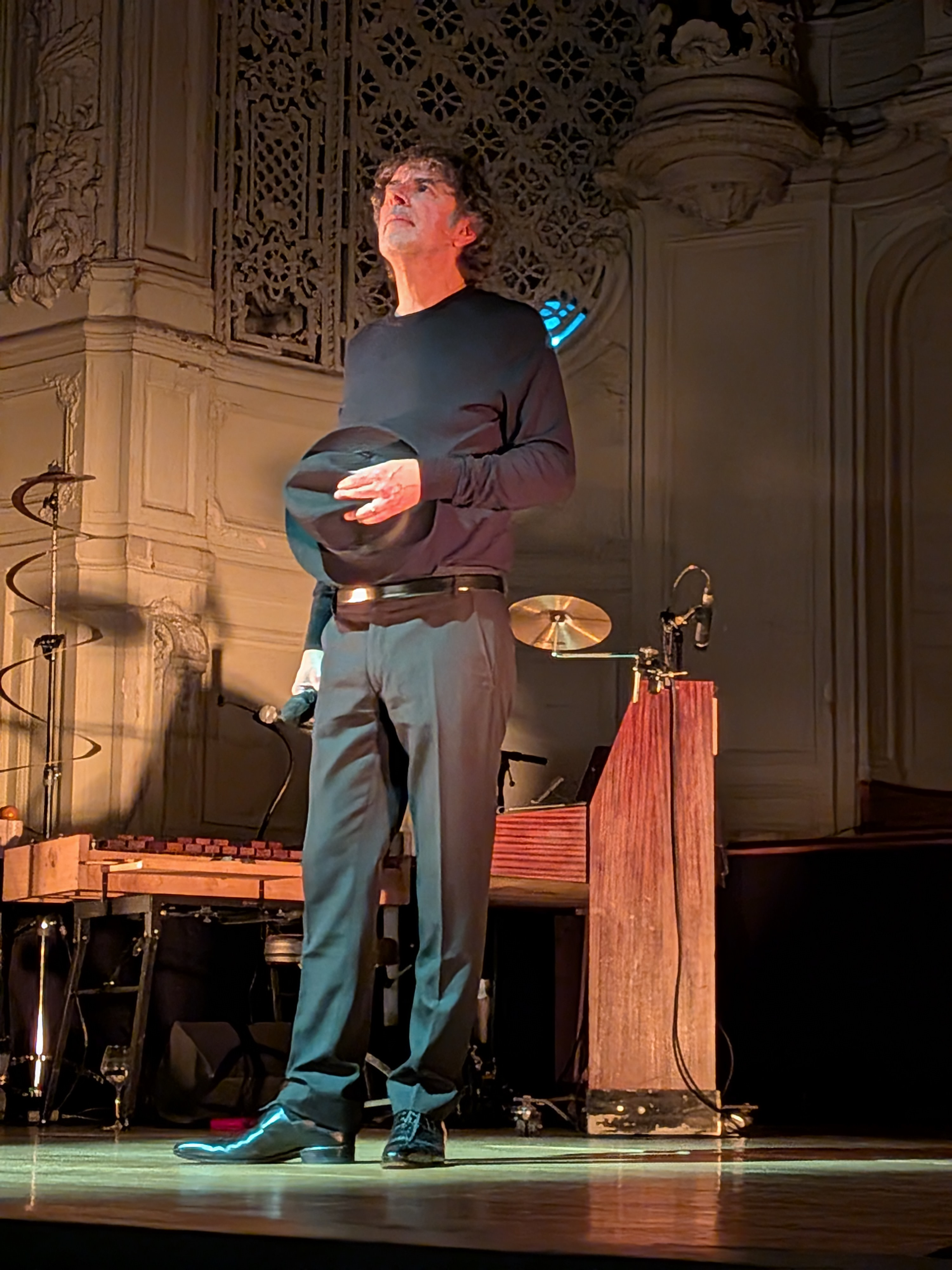
Thomas Fersen on stage at the salle Gaveau in Paris on 01/17/2026.

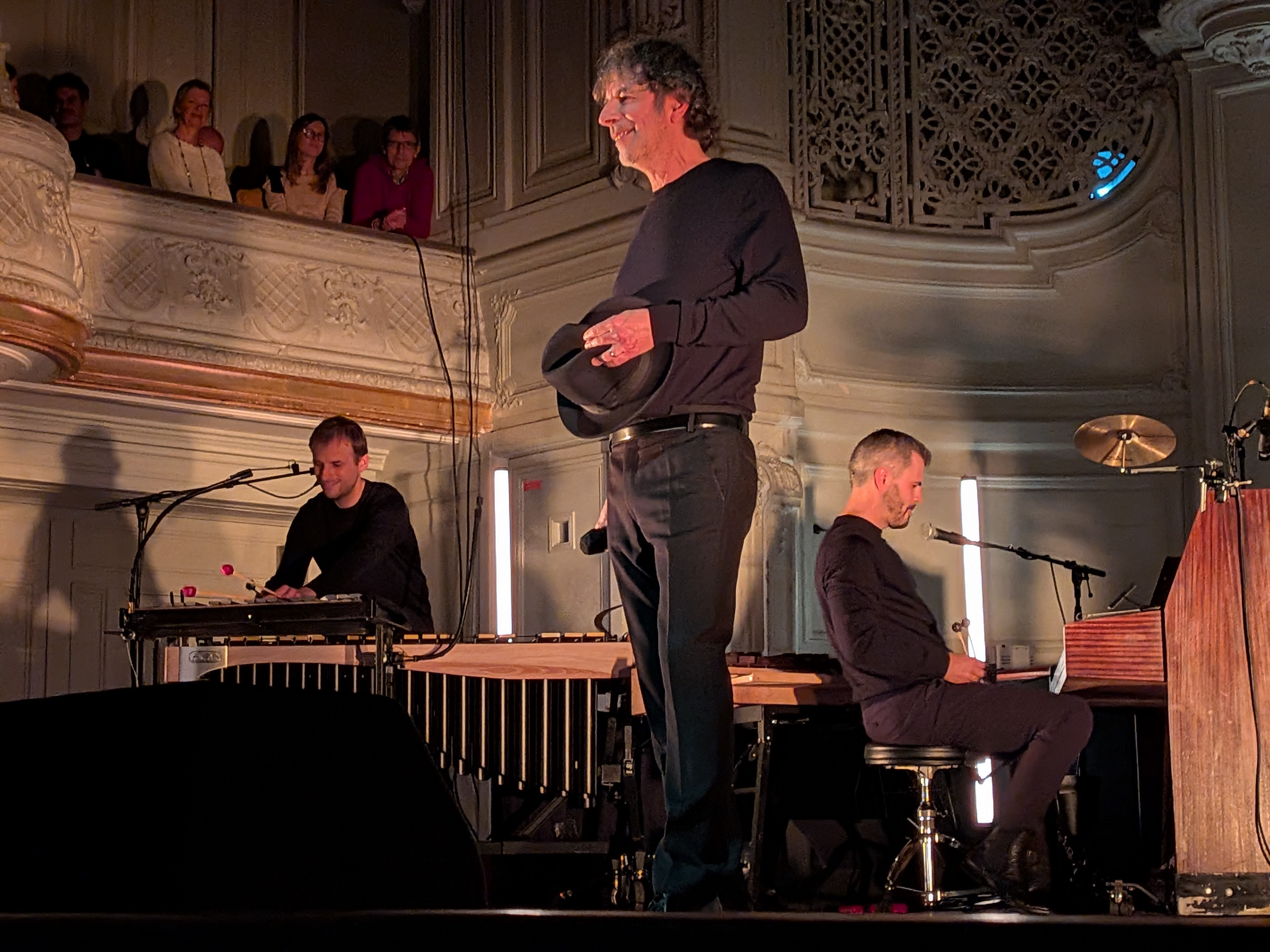
Thomas Fersen on stage at the salle Gaveau on 01/17/2026

== Discography ==
- 1993 – Le Bal des oiseaux (The Ball of the Birds)
- 1995 – Les Ronds de carotte (The Slices of Carrot)
- 1997 – Le Jour du poisson (The Day of the Fish)
- 1999 – Qu4tre (Four)
- 2001 – Triplex (triple album live)
- 2003 – Pièce montée des grands jours (Pièce montée for the Great Days)
- 2004 – La Cigale des grands jours (La Cigale in the Great Days) (public recording at La Cigale; a DVD of the concert also exists)
- 2005 – Le Pavillon des fous (The Insane Asylum)
- 2007 – Gratte-moi la puce – Best of de poche (Scratch My Flea – Pocket-sized Best Of )
- 2008 – Trois petits tours (Three Times Round)
- 2011 – Je suis au paradis (I am in heaven)
- 2013 – Thomas Fersen & The Ginger Accident
- 2017 – Un coup de queue de vache
- 2019 – C'est tout ce qu'il me reste
- 2025 – Le choix de la reine

== Other musical involvement ==
- 2005 – on the Plutôt tôt Plutôt tard album by duos from the Tôt ou tard label, the songs "Escobar" with J. P. Nataf, "Le bouton" with Bumcello, and "La barmaid" with Jeanne Cherhal
- 2006 – Cover of "Sacré géranium" by Dick Annegarn on the compilation Le Grand Dîner
