= N'attendons pas =

Studio album by Vianney
- Released: 30 October 2020
- Length: 37:50
- Label: Tôt ou tard

Vianney chronology
Le concert (2018)	N'attendons pas (2020)	À 2 à 3 (2023)

Vianney studio album chronology
Vianney (2016)	N'attendons pas (2020)	À 2 à 3 (2023)

Singles from N'attendons pas
- 1. "N'attendons pas" Released: 8 May 2020; 2. "Beau-papa" Released: 21 August 2020

N'attendons pas is the third studio album from French singer-songwriter Vianney. It was released on 30 October 2020 by Tôt ou tard. The album includes the singles "N'attendons pas" and "Beau-papa". The album topped the French Albums Chart.

== Singles ==
"N'attendons pas" was released as the lead single from the album on 8 May 2020 and peaked at number 146 on the French Singles Chart, also charting in Belgium. "Beau-papa" was released as the second single from the album on 21 August 2020. It peaked at number 15 on the French Singles Chart and also charted in Belgium.

== Track listing ==
All tracks are written by Vianney

No.	Title	Length
1.	"Merci pour ça"	3:23
2.	"Pour de vrai"	4:01
3.	"Mode"	3:26
4.	"N'attendons pas"	3:13
5.	"Beau-papa"	3:17
6.	"La fille du sud"	3:50
7.	"Funambule"	1:53
8.	"J'ai essayé"	3:03
9.	"Les imbéciles"	3:46
10.	"Pardonnez-moi"	4:07
11.	"Tout nu dans la neige"	3:51
Total length:		37:50

== Charts ==
=== Weekly charts ===
Weekly chart performance for N'attendons pas
Chart (2020–2021)	Peak position
Belgian Albums (Ultratop Flanders)	147
Belgian Albums (Ultratop Wallonia)	2
French Albums (SNEP)	1
Swiss Albums (Schweizer Hitparade)	10

=== Year-end charts ===
2020 year-end chart performance for N'attendons pas
Chart (2020)	Position
Belgian Albums (Ultratop Wallonia)	35
French Albums (SNEP)	14

2021 year-end chart performance for N'attendons pas
Chart (2021)	Position
Belgian Albums (Ultratop Wallonia)	21
French Albums (SNEP)	7

2022 year-end chart performance for N'attendons pas
Chart (2022)	Position
Belgian Albums (Ultratop Wallonia)	91
French Albums (SNEP)	58

2023 year-end chart performance for N'attendons pas
Chart (2023)	Position
French Albums (SNEP)	199

== Certifications ==
Certifications for N'attendons pas
Region	Certification	Certified units/sales
France (SNEP)	Platinum	100,000^{‡}
^{‡} Sales+streaming figures based on certification alone.

== Release history ==
Release history for N'attendons pas
Region	Date	Format	Label
France	30 October 2020	CD; digital download; streaming	Tôt ou tard
