= Éditions du Rocher =

- Parent company: Éditions Artège
- Status: Independent
- Founded: 1943
- Founder: Charles Orengo
- Country of origin: Monaco
- Headquarters location: 28 rue du Comte-Félix-Gastaldi
- Nonfiction topics: health & wellness, politics
- Fiction genres: Literature
- Official website: editionsdurocher.fr

The Éditions du Rocher is a publishing house based in Monaco. It publishes works of literature as well as books about current affairs and well-being. It was founded by Charles Orengo in 1943. It was sold to Éditions Privat in 2005, Éditions Desclée de Brouwer in 2009, and Éditions Artège in 2014.

== Publications ==
In order of publication

- Duhamel, Georges. La musique consolatrice. Monaco, Éditions du Rocher, 1950.
- Michaux, Henri. Misérable Miracle (La Mescaline). Monaco, Éditions du Rocher, 1956.
- Lockspeiser, Edward. Debussy et Edgar Poe: manuscrits et documents inédits. Monaco, Éditions du Rocher, 1962.
- Doresse, Jean. Les Livres secrets des gnostiques d'Égypte. Monaco, Éditions du Rocher, 1984.
- Delerm, Philippe. Un été pour mémoire. Monaco, Éditions du Rocher, 1985.
- Austen, Jane. Orgueil et préjugé. Monaco, Éditions du Rocher, 2001. (Pride and Prejudice).
- Bâ, Mariama. Une Si longue lettre. Monaco, Éditions du Rocher, 2005.
