= Je te déteste =

Single by Vianney

from the album Idées blanches
- Released: 30 April 2014
- Genre: French pop
- Length: 3:58
- Label: Tôt ou Tard
- Songwriter: Vianney
- Producer: Vianney

Vianney singles chronology
| "Je te déteste" (2014) | "Pas là" (2014) |

Music video
- "Je te déteste" on YouTube

"Je te déteste" (English: "I hate you") is the debut single of French singer Vianney. The song was released as a digital download on 30 April 2014 by Tôt ou tard as the lead single from his debut studio album Idées blanches (2014). The song peaked at number 113 on the French Singles Chart. A music video for the song was released.

== Development ==
After several months of airing the track on the radio, Vianney released the music video for "Je te déteste" in July 2014 and announced the upcoming release of his first album. The video clip tells the story of a complicated romantic relationship and evokes the efforts of each within this couple.

Like his second single, "[Pas là]", "Je te déteste" is based on a former girlfriend of the singer.

In May 2016, after the album Idées blancs had sold more than 100,000 copies, the singer decided to use the title "Je te déteste" again, this time referring to French radio stations.

== Track listing ==
Digital download
| No. | Title | Length |
|---|---|---|
| 1. | "Je te déteste" | 3:58 |

== Charts ==
=== Weekly charts ===
| Chart (2014) | Peak position |
|---|---|
| France (SNEP) | 113 |

== Release history ==
| Region | Date | Format | Label |
|---|---|---|---|
| France | 30 April 2014 | Digital download | Tôt ou tard |
