= Idées blanches =

2014 studio album by Vianney

Studio album by Vianney
- Released: 20 October 2014 (France); 21 August 2015 (Europe)
- Recorded: 2013
- Genre: Pop
- Label: Tôt ou tard; Island Records
- Producer: Antoine Essertier

Vianney chronology
| Idées blanches (2014) | Vianney (2016) |

Singles from Forgive Me
- 1. "Je te déteste" Released: 30 April 2014; 2. "Pas là" Released: 25 July 2014; 3. "Veronica" Released: May 2015; 4. "Les gens sont méchants" Released: 30 October 2015; 5. "On est bien comme ça" Released: 9 December 2015

Idées blanches is the debut album of French singer-songwriter Vianney. The album was released in France on 20 October 2014 by Tôt ou tard and was released in Europe on 21 August 2015 by Island Records. A 2 CD Deluxe edition was also published on 20 December 2015, the first CD containing the original titles of the debut album and additionally the track "Lean On" (a cover of Major Lazer and DJ Snake) and two remixes, Skydancers Remix for "Veronica" and Antoine Essertier Remix for "Aux débutants de l'amour". The second CD is separately titled Idées blanches - Les acoustiques containing acoustic renditions of the debut album titles. The album charted on the French Albums Chart peaking at number 30.

== Background ==
All songs on the album were written by Vianney Bureau himself. The album was produced by Antoine Essertier and recorded in Essertier's studios at Ferrières-sur-Sichon, Allier, in central France in the summer of 2013. The track "Notre-Dame des Oiseaux" refers to where Vianney studied in the 16th arrondissement in Paris. The track "Veronica" is a tribute to Swedish singer Veronica Maggio and its video a reference to Vianney touring France on his motorcycle on a low budget.

== Singles ==
Vianney signed with French label Tôt ou tard in February 2014 and in April of the same year, released the first single "Je te déteste" accompanied by a greatly followed music video directed by Nicolas Davenel. The follow-up single was "Pas là". It was released in July 2014, and became his biggest commercial success charted in France where it reached number 18. The single also reached number 13 on the Belgium Wallonia (French-language) charts.

== Track listing ==
Standard edition
| No. | Title | Length |
|---|---|---|
| 1. | "Aux débutants de l'amour" | 2:45 |
| 2. | "Tu le sais" | 3:24 |
| 3. | "Pas là" | 3:51 |
| 4. | "On est bien comme ça" | 2:50 |
| 5. | "Chanson d'hiver" | 3:25 |
| 6. | "Je te déteste" | 3:58 |
| 7. | "Labello" | 2:58 |
| 8. | "Veronica" | 2:59 |
| 9. | "Les gens sont méchants" | 3:06 |
| 10. | "Notre-Dame des oiseaux" | 3:41 |
| 11. | "Tout seul" | 3:47 |
| 12. | "Mon étoile" | 3:37 |

Deluxe edition (CD1)
| No. | Title | Length |
|---|---|---|
| 1. | "Aux débutants de l'amour" | 2:45 |
| 2. | "Tu le sais" | 3:24 |
| 3. | "Pas là" | 3:51 |
| 4. | "On est bien comme ça" | 2:50 |
| 5. | "Chanson d'hiver" | 3:25 |
| 6. | "Je te déteste" | 3:58 |
| 7. | "Labello" | 2:58 |
| 8. | "Veronica" | 2:59 |
| 9. | "Les gens sont méchants" | 3:06 |
| 10. | "Notre-Dame des oiseaux" | 3:41 |
| 11. | "Tout seul" | 3:47 |
| 12. | "Mon étoile" | 3:39 |
| 13. | "Lean On" | 3:01 |
| 14. | "Veronica" (Skydancers remix) | 2:53 |
| 15. | "Aux débutants de l'amour" (Antoine Essertier remix) | 3:02 |

CD2 (Idées blanches – Les acoustiques)
| No. | Title | Length |
|---|---|---|
| 1. | "Aux débutants de l'amour" | 3:43 |
| 2. | "Tu le sais" | 3:49 |
| 3. | "Pas là" | 4:18 |
| 4. | "On est bien comme ça" | 3:33 |
| 5. | "Chanson d'hiver" | 4:42 |
| 6. | "Je te déteste" | 4:04 |
| 7. | "Dis, quand reviendras-tu?" | 4:20 |
| 8. | "Labello" | 3:02 |
| 9. | "Veronica" | 3:13 |
| 10. | "Les gens sont méchants" | 4:13 |
| 11. | "Notre-Dame des oiseaux" | 3:29 |
| 12. | "Man Down" | 4:39 |
| 13. | "Tout seul" | 3:30 |
| 14. | "Mon étoile" | 3:34 |

== Charts ==
=== Weekly charts ===
| Chart (2014–2015) | Peak position |
|---|---|
| Belgian Albums (Ultratop Wallonia) | 29 |
| French Albums (SNEP) | 31 |
| Swiss Albums (Schweizer Hitparade) | 91 |

=== Year-end charts ===
| Chart (2015) | Position |
|---|---|
| Belgian Albums (Ultratop Wallonia) | 124 |
| French Albums (SNEP) | 64 |

| Chart (2016) | Position |
|---|---|
| Belgian Albums (Ultratop Wallonia) | 152 |

| Chart (2017) | Position |
|---|---|
| Belgian Albums (Ultratop Wallonia) | 137 |

== Certifications ==
| Region | Certification | Certified units/sales |
|---|---|---|
| France (SNEP) | 2× Platinum | 200,000^{‡} |
^{‡} Sales+streaming figures based on certification alone.

== Release history ==
| Region | Date | Format | Label |
|---|---|---|---|
| France | 20 October 2014 | Digital download; CD | Tôt ou tard |
| Europe | 21 August 2015 | Digital download; CD | Island Records |
