= Jeanne Cherhal =

French singer-songwriter

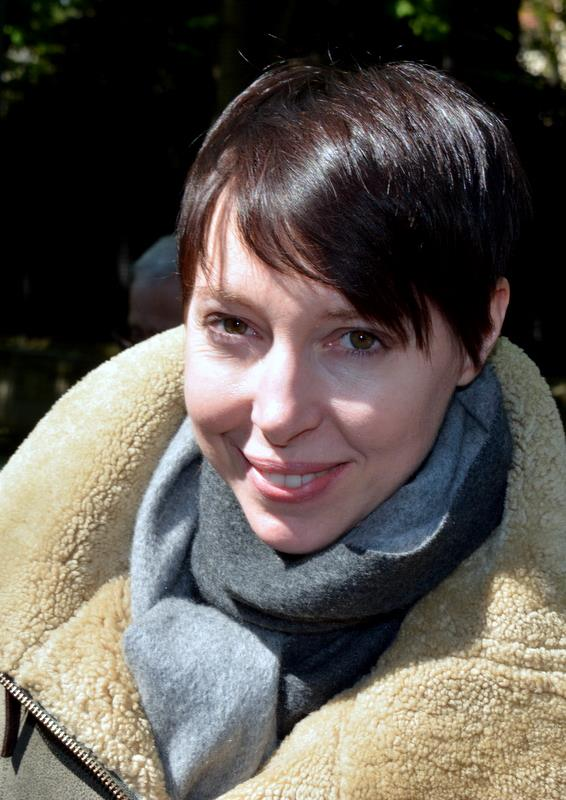
- Jeanne Cherhal in 2016

Background information
- Birth name: Jeanne Cherhal
- Born: February 28, 1978 (age 47); Nantes, France
- Genres: Chanson
- Occupation(s): French singer-songwriter actress
- Instrument(s): Piano, Guitar, Bass Guitar
- Years active: 2002–present
- Labels: CBS Records; Tôt ou tard
- Website: jeannecherhal.fr (in French)

Jeanne Cherhal is a French singer-songwriter.

== Life and career ==
After spending her younger years in Erbray near Châteaubriant, Cherhal studied philosophy before moving to Paris. She started her singing career playing piano – solo, or accompanied by her guitarist Éric Löhrer in small concert venues. At the time she sported long, plaited hair. After a six-title CD (edited by Madame Suzie), she released an album entitled "Jeanne Cherhal" with the independent label Tôt ou tard.

Little by little, her renown increased. At the beginning she sang Georges Moustaki, Jacques Higelin, Thomas Fersen and Emir Kusturica; she was invited on by the group les Têtes Raides, sang as a double act with Vincent Delerm and sometimes as a trio with d'Albin de La Simone. She also performed in a series of concerts with Matthieu Bouchet, which culminated in the production of the CD-booklet [en même temps...] (produced in a limited edition of 1500 copies).

Cherhal's second album Douze fois par an (Twelve times a year), released in 2004, was a huge success. Along with this she received recognition not only from the music world, but also from a large and ever-increasing fan base.

Towards the end of 2005, she performed in the French version of "The Vagina Monologues"

In 2006 her third album, L'eau (Water), produced by Albin de la Simone. Musically speaking, it was much more polished and the themes it contained were at the same time more personal and more involved. This album would enable her once more to tour in France and abroad, performing in Belgium and Switzerland; in Berlin, London, Dublin and Beirut; in Canada, Congo, Central African Republic, in Gabon and in Angola.

In February 2008, inspired by "the famous text message", she placed a previously unheard track on her MySpace page: "Si tu reviens, j'annule tout"... (If you come back, I'll cancel everything...)

2008 would also mark Jeanne's first steps in the world of cinema as she would play the main rôle in two short films:

– La consultation (the consultation): directed by Frédérik Vin in the framework of the French television channel Canal+'s campaign "Ecrire pour un chanteur" (Write for a singer)

– La copie de Coralie (Coralie's Copy): directed by Nicolas Hengel, nominated at the Cannes Film Festival

== Discography ==
=== Albums ===
Year	Album	Peak positions		Certification
Year	Album	FR	BEL (Wa)	Certification
2002	Jeanne Cherhal	–	–	
2004	Douze fois par an	12	98	
2006	L'Eau	9	99	
2010	Charade	30	42	
2014	Histoire de J.	20	37	
2019	L'an 40	30	86	
2025	Jeanne	–	198	

Others

- 2001: Jeanne Cherhal (CD - 6 tracks, Madame Suzie. self-published)
- 2002: en même temps... (Jeanne Cherhal & Matthieu Bouchet), Madame Suzie). self-published)

== Selected filmography ==
- The Very Private Life of Mister Sim
- Spirit World (2024) as Music director

== Awards ==
- 2004: Grand Prix du Disque de L'Académie Charles Cros for "Douze fois par an"
- 2005: Revelation of the year at the Victoires de la Musique
