= Venus (Belgian band) =

Belgian acoustic/orchestrated band

- Band picture Vertigone album booklet

Background information
- Origin: Belgium
- Genres: Acoustic/Orchestrated
- Years active: 1997–2007
- Label: Tôt ou tard
- Past members: Marc A. Huyghens; Christian Schreurs; Pierre Jacqmin; Jean-Marc Butty; Patric Carpentier; Thomas Van Cottom; Walter Janssens

Venus was a band created in 1997 by five artists hailing from Brussels and Belgium. The original goal of the band was to create an original sound that expressed different emotions through several instruments including guitar, violin, double bass, organ, percussion, synth, and a host of others. Also using the scenography talents of former member Patric Carpentier to create visual emotion through their live performances. They have had success with releases Beautiful Days and Wanda Wultz from their Capitol record label release in 2003, Vertigone. The single Beautiful Days was also a track featured in the film Immortel, which is based on the popular futuristic and Ancient Egyptian styled Enki Bilal comic series. The band's name is in reference to and inspired by the Velvet Underground track, Venus in furs.

== List of former band members ==
- Marc A. Huyghens - Vocals, acoustic and slide guitars, mandolin, banjo, electric piano, xylophone, organ, mellotron, synth (1997–2007)
- Christian Schreurs - Violin, acoustic and electric guitars, organ, noises (1997–2007)
- Pierre Jacqmin - Double bass (2000–2007)
- Jean-Marc Butty - Drums, acoustic and electronic percussion (2001–2007)
- Patric Carpentier - Scenography (1997–2001)
- Thomas Van Cottom - Drums, acoustic and electronic percussion (1997–2001)
- Walter Janssens - Double bass (1997–2000)

== Band history ==
=== Starting in Belgium ===
The band released their first album under the label BGM/RCA titled Royal Sucker EP. Shortly after in March 1999 the band's relations with the label had ended and signed on with a small Italian label, Sonica. During their new beginnings with the label they received an award for Best Rock Act at the French festival Le Printemps de Bourges in April that year. Now their goal was to record and release a full-length album within the year.

Their full-length album Welcome To The Modern Dance Hall was released on schedule before the turn of the century, November 1999. This album was distributed throughout Europe and became the reason most people discovered the band with its memorable organic instrumentation. The only singles they released from the album were Pop Song along with a vinyl EP release titled She's So Disco, which dominated radio stations at the time. A few Belgium based EP releases using tracks from their full-length album as well as brand new stunning songs were released later on under 62 TV. During this time before the major portion of touring western Europe began in 2000 double bassist Walter Jenssens left the band and he was replaced by current member Pierre Jacqmin.

In 2000 Venus were touring relentlessly until middle through the year, hoping to have their sounds heard on the local radios wherever they played. Many fans believe that the band is best when viewed at one of their live performances, some of which were played for free at smaller venues which ultimately left them with many sell-outs in the coming months. During autumn the band gave composer Renaud Lhoest permission to re-orchestrate their songs, which further positioned themselves further away from the rock scene into something untouchable in originality. Set between John Barry and the Jewish Folklore along with the full Ensemble Musiques Nouvelles, the band were set to play a sold-out show in Brussels. Recorded live at the Cirque Royal and created into the stunning The Man Who Was Already Dead, this ended up being one of their more popular albums which expressed the true beauty of their music collectively into orchestra and modern instrument. During 2001 the band rested long after their relentless touring and lost two members, Patric Carpentier and Thomas Van Cottom. Thomas is a good friend of current double bassist Pierre but this did not prevent him from leaving during the time. He was eventually replaced by a French drummer who had been working with P.J. Harvey on the album To Bring You My Love as well as touring with the artist. He had also released a project of his own titled White Hotel in 1999 before joining the band.

=== Vertigone success ===
In 2003 the band left Italian label Sonica Factory to sign with bigger label Capitol, where they were given the chance to create a higher quality album. They released Vertigone that year on 3 March as well as three singles. The first being Wanda Wultz was released as a single and promotion of the band's new upcoming album, the second release Beautiful Days had multiple versions which were not available everywhere. One being a Belgium release, another for radio only, and the final as the official release containing a radio edited version of the song. The final single was included in a special version of the Vertigone album which contained four songs, three of which were radio session versions of tracks on the full-length album, and a cover of U2's Love Is Blindness, from their album Achtung Baby in 1991.

The release of the album came as a success as radio stations across Europe played their recent singles as well as one being used in a film by Enki Bilal titled Immortel in 2004. Vocalist Marc A. Huyghens had also been working on a side project titled Little Hotel during the band's time off.

=== The Red Room ===
In Spring 2006 the band released their new album The Red Room with a new approach and sound compared to their previous efforts. The music presents a heavier tone this time out and has been simplified yet still contains their trademark unique and melodic feel that made them a hit in the past. The album received good reviews across Europe and rivaled the sales of their previous albums though their record label Tôt Ou Tard believed they would do even better.

"The Red Room" was co-produced by Head who has worked with PJ Harvey, Marianne Faithfull, and Massive Attack. On the new official Venus website the band reveals that the actual red room "is the place you would seek refuge when you want to be alone. An area of well-being but also of alienation – everything is possible but is also uncertain." It is also the place where Marc A. Huyghens wrote the lyrics to all of the new songs with the exception of the track Everybody Wants To Be Loved, which words were taken from Gena Rowlands' monologue in Opening Night. Venus promoted the new album by touring through Western Europe and the UK.

=== Venus says Goodbye ===
On 23 March 2007, a 10th anniversary concert was scheduled at the Ancienne Belgique in Brussels. However, at the end of February, Marc A. Huyghens announced on Venus' official website that "After ten “out-of-this-world” years – full of way-out adventures, mesmerizing concerts, a few chaotic patches, quite a few drunken giggles – I have decided to move on to new intergalactic adventures". The 10th anniversary gig turned into a goodbye concert, including many guests such as members from Girls in Hawaii and Ghinzu, as well as Venus' former double bass player, Walter Janssens and others. A last EP containing covers of Daniel Lanois, Björk and fellow Belgian singer Jacques Brel was released for the occasion.

Since the band's dissolve, Marc A. Huyghens has been working with Françoise Vidick and Anja Naucler to form JOY. The band released their self-titled debut album in autumn 2010.

== Discography ==
Year	Albums/EP/Singles	Label
1998	Royal Sucker EP	BGM/RCA
1999	Welcome To The Modern Dance Hall	Sonica Factory
1999	She's So Disco EP/Vinyl	62 TV/Sonica Factory
2000	Pop Song EP/Single	Sonica Factory
2000	I Am The Ocean EP	62 TV
2000	Perfect Lover EP	62 TV
2000	The Man Who Was Already Dead	62 TV
2003	Vertigone	Capitol
2003	Vertigone French Edition	Capitol, Delabel
2003	Beautiful Days EP/Single	Capitol, Delabel
2006	The Red Room	BANG!/Tôt Ou Tard
2006	O Marie EP	BANG!/Tôt Ou Tard
2007	Best Of & Live	BANG!/Tôt Ou Tard
