= Les Frangines =

French musical duo

- Origin: France
- Genres: Chanson, pop-folk, acoustic music
- Labels: Jo & Co
- Members: Anne Coste; Jacinthe Madelin
- Website: lesfranginesmusique.fr

Les Frangines (meaning literally “The Sisters” in colloquial French) are a French musical duo composed of female singers and guitarists Anne Coste and Jacinthe Madelin. Their sound can be described as acoustic pop-folk.

== Background ==
Les Frangines is composed of Anne Coste and Jacinthe Madelin. The two have been friends since they were 12. Both women studied at the same school (near La Celle-Saint-Cloud in the Paris suburbs) and first met on their way there.

Only Madelin, who studied flute for 15 years, has formal musical training. Both studied literature at university. They learned to play guitars by watching online video lessons. They started writing songs in Spain during their student internship there under the Erasmus Programme.

In 2014 they launched their own YouTube channel and began to upload their own songs. They raised money for their first professional music video using crowdfunding. The pair noted: "It was an unexpected success, and it inspired us to continue, even though it was not easy to combine study and music."

Les Frangines were noticed and then signed by the record label Jo & Co. In March 2018 they released their debut single, titled "Si j'osais" ("If I Dared"). Their first EP, Vagabondes, followed on 22 June 2018.

The duo's first hit, "Donnez-moi"" (lit. "Give Me"), was co-written and composed with Vianney. Released as a single on 8 March 2019, the song racked up over 500,000 streams in one month and reached the top 10 on iTunes.

On 21 June 2019, the duo released their first album, titled simply Les Frangines. On 29 November, the album was reissued in an expanded "Deluxe Edition" containing several extra tracks. On 3 January 2020, the album was certified Gold by the French national syndicate for music publishing (SNEP) having sold more than 50,000 copies sold.

== Discography ==
=== Studio albums ===
Album	Charts	Certifications
Album	FRA	Certifications
Les Frangines: Released : 21 June, 2019; Label : Jo & Co	37	FRA: Gold
Les Frangines (Version deluxe): Sortie : 29 November, 2019; Label : Jo & Co	18	FRA: Gold
Notes: Released : May 5, 2022; Label : Jo & Co	28	
Poèmes: Released : May 23, 2024; Label : Jo & Co	68	

=== EPs ===
Album
Vagabondes
- Released : 22 June 2018
- Label : Jo & Co

=== Singles ===
Title	Year	Charts		Certification	Album
Title	Year	FRA	BEL (Wa)	Certification	Album
"Si j'osais"	2018	—	—		Vagabondes (EP), Les Frangines
"Mon bagage"	2018	—	—		Les Frangines
"Donnez-moi"	2019	84	Tip:11	FRA: Gold	Les Frangines
"Accroché à ma terre"	2019	—	—		Les Frangines (Version deluxe)
"Ensemble"	2019				Les Frangines (Version deluxe)
"Ensemble (Version acoustique)"	2019				—
