= Sacré Géranium =

Album by Dick Annegarn

Sacré Géranium is the first album of the Dutch singer-songwriter Dick Annegarn, released in 1974.

All songs are in French and were composed by the singer. It took its name from the first song, "Sacré Géranium", which was also a hit.

== Track list ==
1. Sacré Géranium (2:41)
2. La Transformation (3:39)
3. Le Grand Dîner (3:42)
4. Bruxelles (2:28)
5. Volet Fermé (1:50)
6. Faubert Waltz (2:32)
7. Bébé éléphant (2:37)
8. L'univers (3:15)
9. L'institutrice (2:24)
10. L'Orage (4:57)
11. Ubu (1:36)

== Production ==
- Lyrics and music: Dick Annegarn
- Arrangements: Jean Musy
- Sound: Paul Houdebine; assisted by Philippe Puig
- Artistic direction: Jacques Bedos
