= Silvain Vanot =

French singer-songwriter (born 1963)

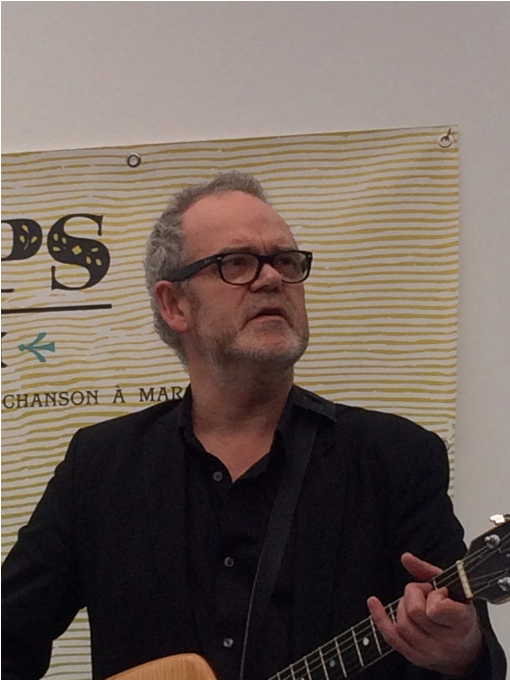
Silvain Vanot

Silvain Vanot (born 1963) is a French singer-songwriter. He has issued seven albums and also composes film music.

Egérie (1997).
