= François Audrain =

French singer

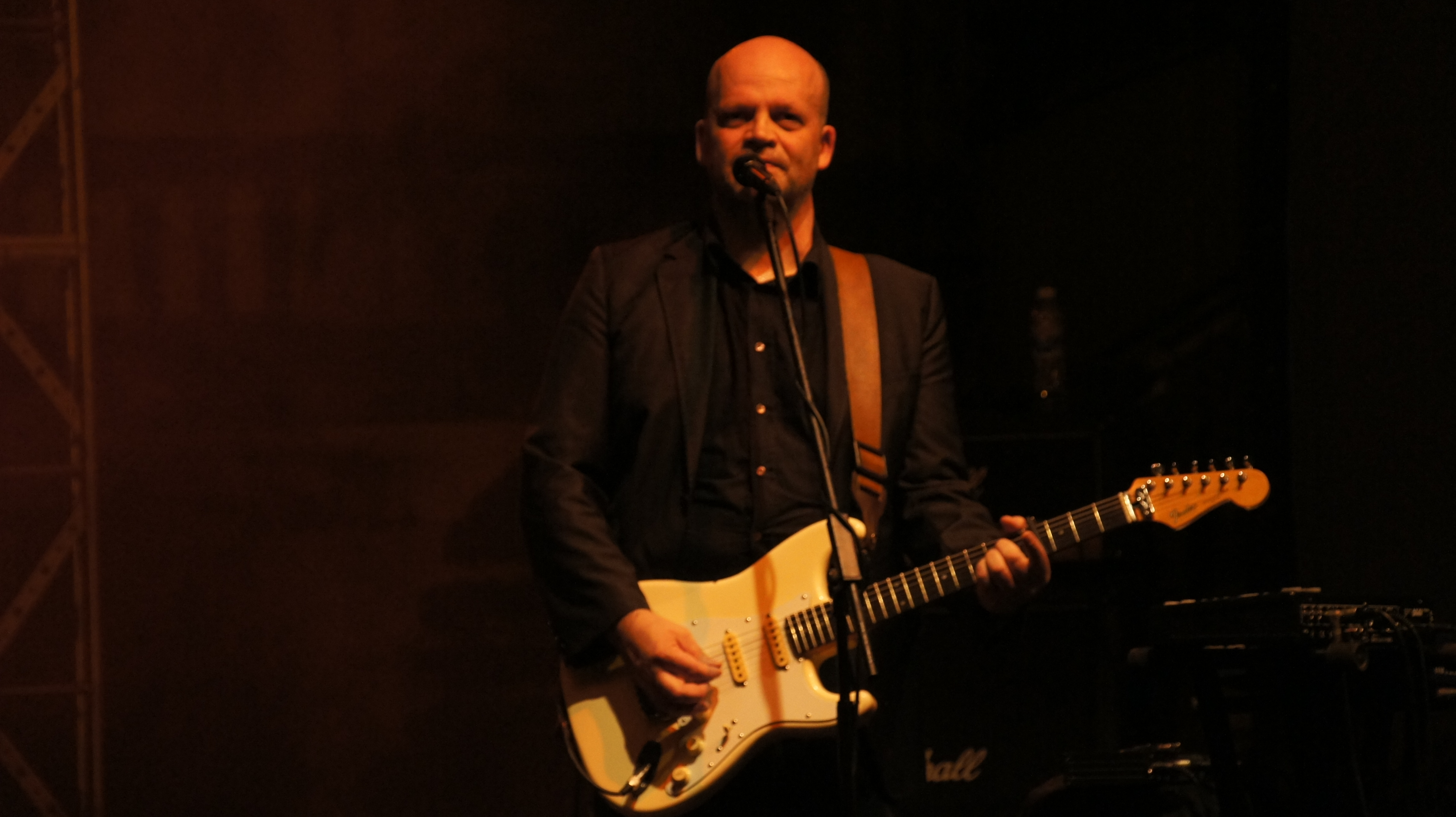
François Audrain - during a concert

François Audrain is a French pop singer. He also taught history at Collège François Truffaut (in Betton) until 2006 and later at Collège Émile Zola (in Rennes)

== Biography ==
François Audrain grew up in Saint-Malo and lives in Rennes. He is a musician and a history teacher at Émile-Zola Middle School. His two professions often complement each other.

His style, which blends chanson and electronic music, is poetic and personal. Journalist Valérie Lehoux compares it to that of Miossec, Vincent Delerm, or Arman Méliès. He is a leading figure in the spoken-sung style.

He first performed at the Vieilles Charrues Festival in 1999. He has collaborated with David Euverte, David Monceau, Barbara Carlotti, Vincent Delerm, Christian Olivier (Têtes Raides), and choreographer Julie Desprairies, among others.

In 2018, he performed at the I'm From Rencontres Trans Musicales, and led an album project centered on workers’ memories, bringing together musician friends around the lime kiln in Lormandière near Chartres-de-Bretagne. This album of songs, Melancholia, which explores the Industrial Revolution and working-class history, was released in 2024 and was presented at the I'm From Rennes festival.

== Discography ==
=== Studio albums ===
- 2001: Détachée (Tôt Ou Tard/Warner Music France)
- 2004: Chambres Lointaines (Tôt Ou Tard/Warner Music France)
- 2009: Les Soirs d'Eté (Tôt Ou Tard/Warner Music France)
