= Vianney (album) =

Studio album by Vianney
- Released: 25 November 2016
- Recorded: 2015
- Label: Tôt ou tard

Vianney chronology
Idées blanches (2014)	Vianney (2016)	Le concert (2018)

Vianney studio album chronology
Idées blanches (2014)	Vianney (2016)	N'attendons pas (2020)

Singles from Vianney
- 1. "Je m'en vais" Released: 17 October 2016; 2. "Moi aimer toi" Released: 13 March 2017; 3. "Dumbo" Released: 4 July 2017; 4. "Le Fils à papa" Released: 16 February 2018; 5. "J'm'en fous" Released: 17 August 2018

Vianney is the second studio album from French singer-songwriter Vianney. It was released on 25 November 2016 by Tôt ou tard. The album includes the singles "Je m'en vais", "Moi aimer toi", "Dumbo", "Le Fils à papa" and "J'm'en fous". The album has peaked at number 1 on the French Albums Chart.

== Singles ==
"Je m'en vais" was released as the lead single from the album on 17 October 2016. The song has peaked at number 2 on the French Singles Chart, the song has also charted in Belgium and Switzerland. "Moi aimer toi" was released as the second single from the album on 13 March 2017. The song has peaked at number 24 on the French Singles Chart, the song has also charted in Belgium. "Dumbo" was released as the third single from the album on 4 July 2017. The song has peaked at number 151 on the French Singles Chart, the song has also charted in Belgium. "Le Fils à papa" was released as the fourth single from the album on 16 February 2018. The song charted in Belgium. "J'm'en fous" was released as the fifth and final single from the album on 17 August 2018. The song has peaked at number 153 on the French Singles Chart.

== Track listing ==
Standard edition
No.	Title	Length
1.	"Sans le dire"	3:46
2.	"Je m'en vais"	3:18
3.	"Dumbo"	3:32
4.	"Tombe la neige"	2:55
5.	"Moi aimer toi"	3:18
6.	"Le fils à papa"	6:59
7.	"J'm'en fous"	4:21
8.	"Oublie-moi"	4:53
9.	"Quand je serai père"	3:48
10.	"L'homme et l'âme"	5:05
11.	"Le galopin"	3:37

== Charts ==
=== Weekly charts ===
Chart (2016–17)	Peak position
Belgian Albums (Ultratop Flanders)	118
Belgian Albums (Ultratop Wallonia)	2
French Albums (SNEP)	1
Swiss Albums (Schweizer Hitparade)	12

=== Year-end charts ===
Chart (2016)	Position
Belgian Albums (Ultratop Wallonia)	200
French Albums (SNEP)	50
Chart (2017)	Position
Belgian Albums (Ultratop Wallonia)	12
French Albums (SNEP)	4
Swiss Albums (Schweizer Hitparade)	56
Chart (2018)	Position
Belgian Albums (Ultratop Wallonia)	70

== Certifications ==
Region	Certification	Certified units/sales
Belgium (BRMA)	Gold	15,000^{‡}
France (SNEP)	Diamond	500,000^{‡}
^{‡} Sales+streaming figures based on certification alone.

== Release history ==
Region	Date	Format	Label
France	25 November 2016	Digital download; CD	Tôt ou tard
