= Philippe Delerm =

French writer

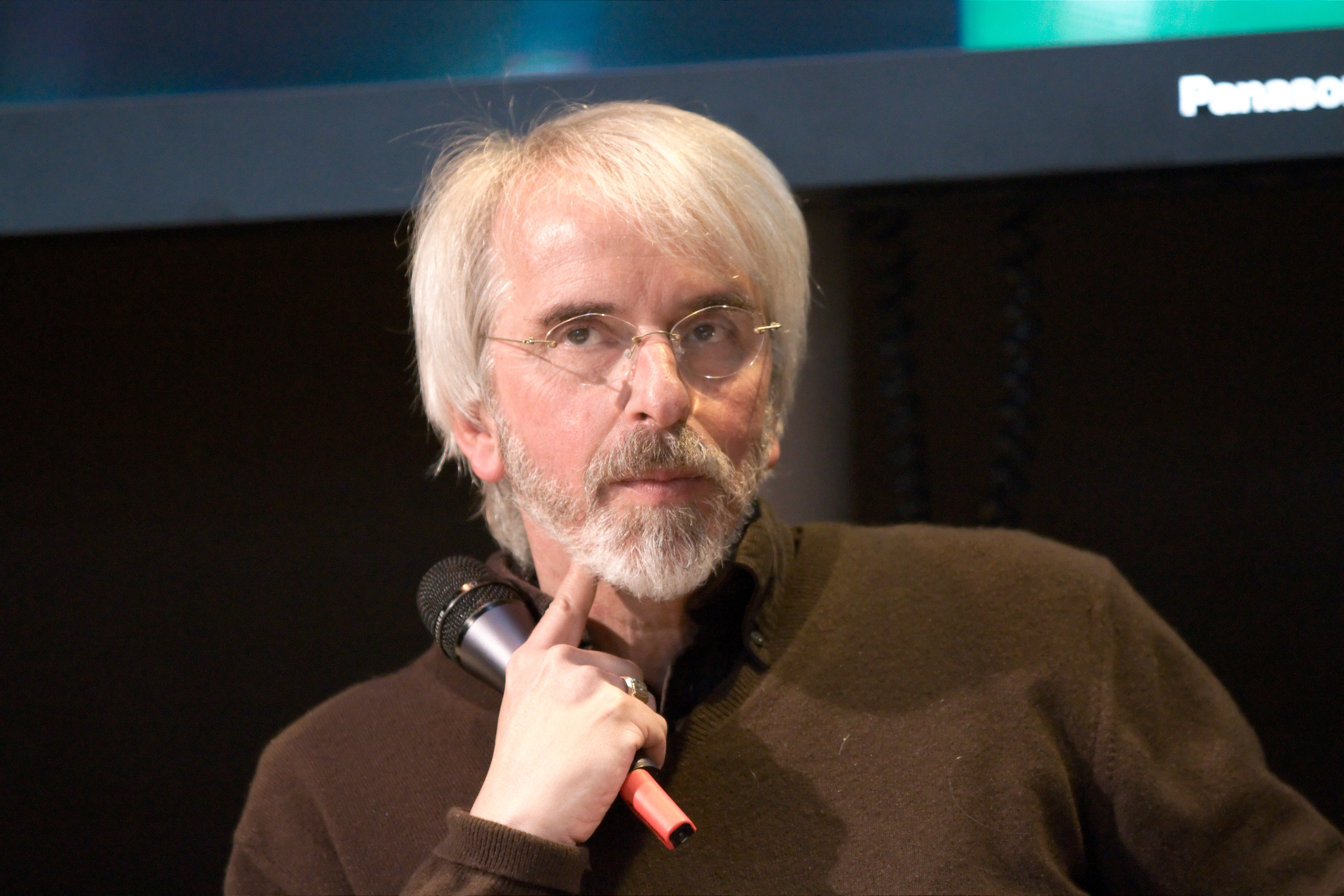
- Philippe Delerm in March 2010.
- Born: November 27, 1950 (age 75); Auvers-sur-Oise, Val-d'Oise, France
- Education: Paris X University Nanterre
- Occupation: Author
- Children: Vincent Delerm
- Writing career
- Genres: Novel, Novella, Essay
- Notable work: La première gorgée de bière
- Notable awards: Prix des Libraires

Philippe Delerm (born November 27, 1950, in Auvers-sur-Oise, Val-d'Oise, France) is a French writer whose collection of essays La Première gorgée de bière et autres plaisirs minuscules sold more than one million copies in France.

== Writing career ==
After a happy childhood with his teacher parents, Philippe Delerm pursued literary studies at Nanterre before becoming a teacher himself. In 1975, he married Martine Chosson, moved to Beaumont-le-Roger in Eure, and taught French Literature at the Marie Curie Collège (Secondary School) in Bernay. The first manuscripts which Delerm sent in from 1976 were refused by publishers.

In 1983, La Cinquième saison aroused interest in the author, and he won the 1990 Prix Alain-Fournier for his novel Autumn. He achieved his first major success in 1997 with the release of La Première gorgée de bière et autres plaisirs minuscules, a collection of 35 essays or meditations, each one or two pages in length, describing the joys that can be taken in the "insignificant things" that make up life. It was translated into English as The Small Pleasures of Life (also known as We Could Almost Eat Outside: An appreciation of life's small pleasures) by Sarah Hamp.

Delerm ended his teaching career in 2007 in order to concentrate on his writing full-time.

== Sports journalism ==
As an amateur athlete in track & field, Delerm collaborated with the French sports newspaper L'Equipe for the 2004 Olympic Games in Athens, writing a daily piece for one of the track & field events. In August 2008, he was invited by France Television to be a commentator for track & field events at the Beijing Olympics.

He also covered the 2009 French Open.

== Family ==
Delerm is married to children's book illustrator Martine Delerm, with whom he has one son, singer-songwriter Vincent Delerm.

== Bibliography ==
- Dickens, barbe à papa et autres nourritures délectables
- Enregistrements pirates
- La Première gorgée de bière et autres plaisirs minuscules (The Small Pleasures of Life ISBN 1-86159-116-0; We Could Almost Eat Outside: An appreciation of life's small pleasures ISBN 0-312-20364-0)
- La Cinquième saison
- Le Portique
- La Fille du Bouscat
- Il avait plu tout le dimanche
- Sortilège au muséum
- Sunborn ou Les Jours de lumière
- En pleine lucarne
- La Sieste assassinée
- Les Chemins nous inventent
- Mister Mouse ou La Métaphysique du terrier
- Autumn
- L'Envol
- Un Été pour mémoire
- Panier de fruits
- Le Buveur de temps
- Les Amoureux de l'hôtel de ville
- La Bulle de Tiepolo
- Elle s'appelait Marine
- Le Bonheur. Tableaux et bavardages
- Le Miroir de ma mère
- C'est bien
- Rouen
- C'est toujours bien
- À Garonne
- Paris l'instant
- La tranchée d'Arenberg et autres voluptés sportives
- Quelque chose en lui de Bartleby
- Et vous avez eu beau temps?
