= Da Silva (singer) =

French singer of Portuguese descent

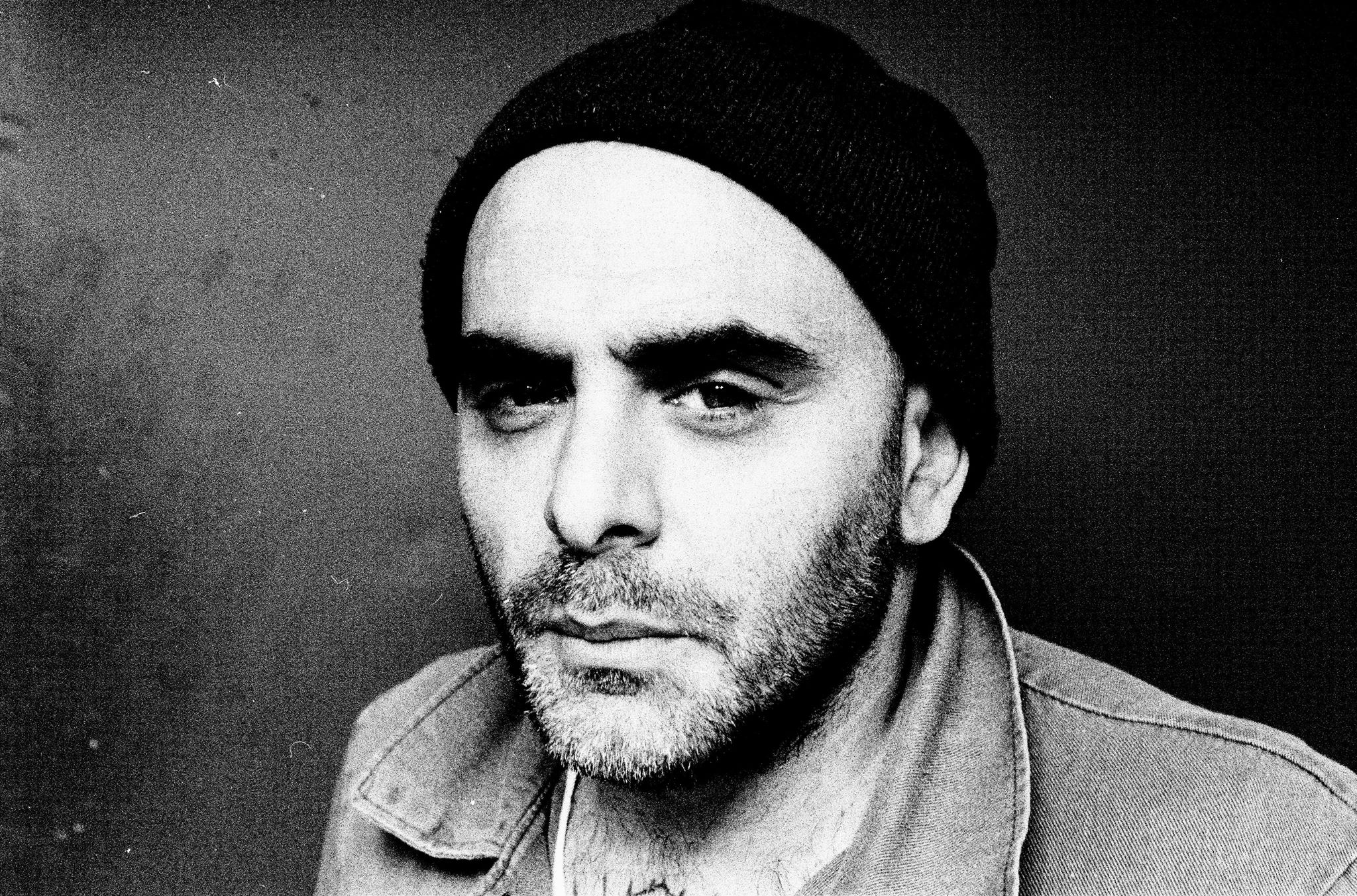
Da Silva

Emmanuel da Silva, better known as Da Silva (born in Nevers on 15 April 1976), is a French singer-songwriter of Portuguese descent. A Le Monde critic called him a musical chameleon passing from punk and industrial to electro, garage, and rock.

In his adolescence, he was part of the punk group Mad Coakroches and later formed his own band Punishment Park. At 21, he moved to more acoustic sounds with the group.

He resided for about two years in Dinan in Côtes-d'Armor, an area that has been a source of inspiration for Da Silva. He recorded his first two self-financed albums in the local Théâtre des Jacobins. After Dinan, Da Silva moved to Rennes, where he created his own home studio.

With help from Cali, who invited him to open up for some of his concerts, he released the album Décembre en été in 2005 that sold 110,000 copies and included the folk style single "L'Indécision". What followed was a more melancholic pessimistic album in 2007 titled De beaux jours à venir on his take on life in general.

La Tendresse des fous in 2009 became his most successful commercial album that reached the French Top 20, followed by La distance in 2012 and Villa Rosa in 2013.

== Discography ==
=== Albums ===
Year	Album	Peak positions	
Year	Album	FR	BEL (Wa)
2005	Décembre en été	35	—
2007	De beaux jours à venir	23	—
2009	La tendresse des fous	16	71
2012	La distance	38	—
2013	Villa Rosa	70	—

=== Singles ===
- 2005: ""L'Indécision"
