= Vianney (singer) =

French singer and songwriter

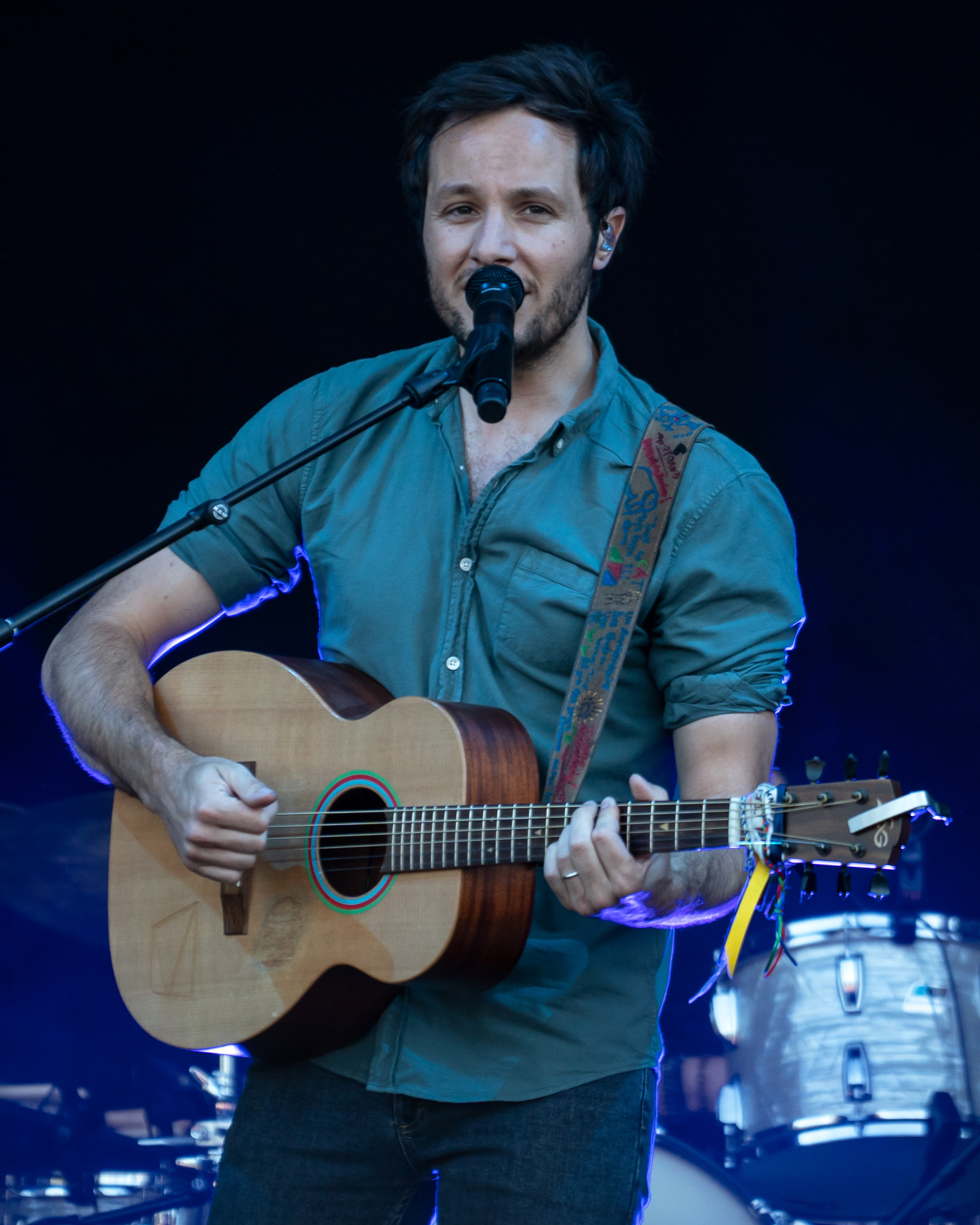
- Vianney in 2022
- Born: Vianney Bureau; 13 February 1991 (age 35); Pau, France
- Education: ESMOD (BA)
- Occupations: Singer; songwriter
- Years active: 2014–present
- Spouse: Catherine Robert (m. 2020)
- Children: 1
- Musical career
- Genre: Pop
- Instruments: Guitar, piano
- Label: Oliniho Records
- Website: vianney-musique.com

Signature
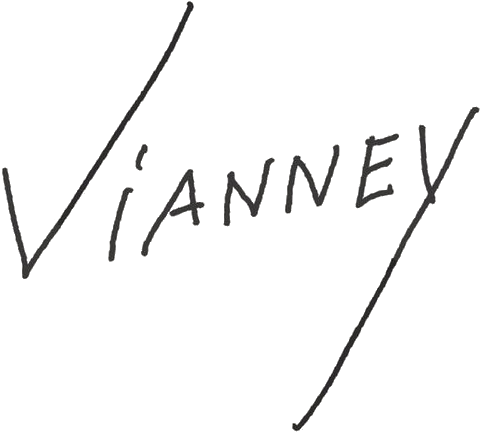

Vianney Bureau (French pronunciation: [vjanɛ byʁo]; born 13 February 1991), better known by the mononym Vianney, is a French singer-songwriter. At 24 years old he won the award for performing artist of the year at the "Victoires de la musique 2016" one year after having been named in the up and coming category of the "Victoires de la musique 2015". His debut album Idées blanches was certified platinum. His second album was released on 25 November 2016 and was certified double platinum.

== Beginnings ==
Born to a father who was a helicopter pilot in the army and a mother who worked in animal control, Vianney comes from a family of three brothers. Vianney grew up in a music-loving family. Listening to his father sing while playing songs on the guitar by artists such as Georges Brassens, François Béranger, Maxime Le Forestier and Rickie Lee Jones, Vianney discovered a passion for music from the age of 12 and began to write songs from then on. In 2005, his father introduced him to some musician friends with whom he recorded his first track along with his older brother. In 2007, he held his first concert in an auditorium, the New Morning in Paris. He grew up in Paris and studied at Notre-Dame-des-Oiseaux College in the 16th district, where he would write a song of the same name, present on his first album Idées blanches. He then attended the Lycée militaire de Saint-Cyr, where he would spend three years. After his baccalaureate, in 2009, he studied at the Paris School of Business, formerly the ESG Management School de Paris, for three more years and later earned a business diploma in London. Finally, he studied styling at École supérieure des arts et techniques de la mode (ESMOD), graduating in June 2014. He explained his school life by his "desire to live in different ways", and believes that these experiences had "opened [his] mind, socially and artistically".

== Career ==
In 2011, Vianney met Isabelle Vaudey, who became his manager. It was Vaudey who encouraged Vianney to reveal his songs to the general public, and she arranged a meeting with vocalist Antoine Essertier, who offered to produce his debut album, Idées blanches, which was recorded throughout two weeks during summer of 2013 in the Auvergne mountains, not far from Vichy. The album was realised on 20 October 2014. With the album, he was signed to the "Tôt ou tard" record label in February 2014. His first charting single from the album was "Je te déteste" with the music video directed by Nicolas Davenel. The follow-up single "Pas là" became his biggest chart success. The music video was directed by Nicolas Bary and featured Lola Bessis.

He took part in the 30-event tour of Florent Pagny entitled Vieillir Ensemble, and has recorded with other artists, including Samaha of Shaka Ponk, and then with Joyce Jonathan in "Les filles d'aujourd'hui". He also recorded an acoustic version of his album Idées blanches.

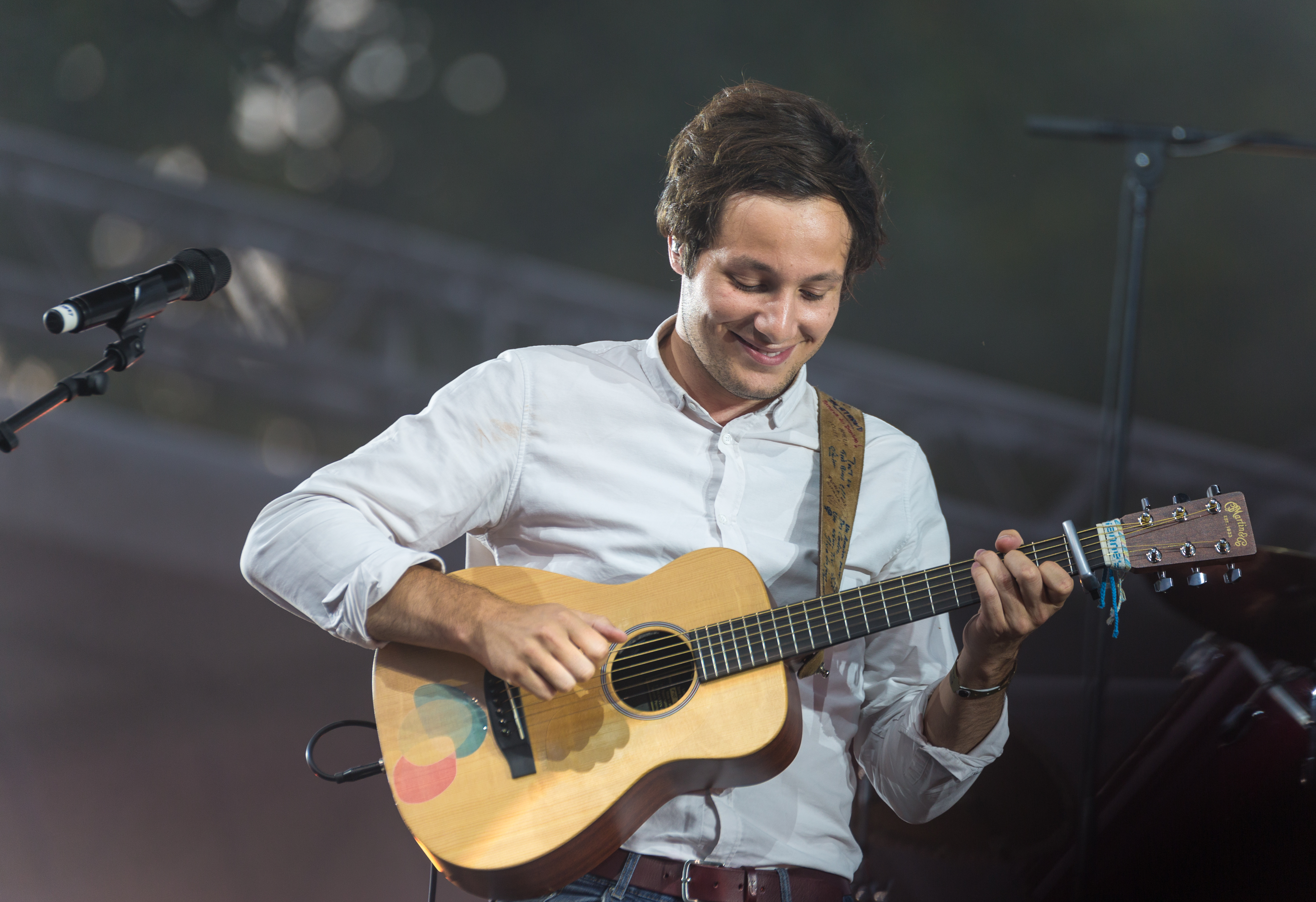
Vianney in 2015

On 27 January 2015, he won the W9 Talent Award over other nominated acts Christine and the Queens, Indila, Black M, Irma, The Dø, Camélia Jordana, Peter Peter, Brigitte and Adrien Gallo. He was nominated for "Revelation Album of the Year" during Victoires de la musique 2015. In 2016, he won the "Artiste interprète of the Year" at the same event.

From 2021 to 2025, Vianney served as a coach on the competition The Voice – La plus belle voix.

== Personal life ==
In 2020, Vianney married Catherine Robert, and had his first child with her in 2021.

== Awards and nomination ==
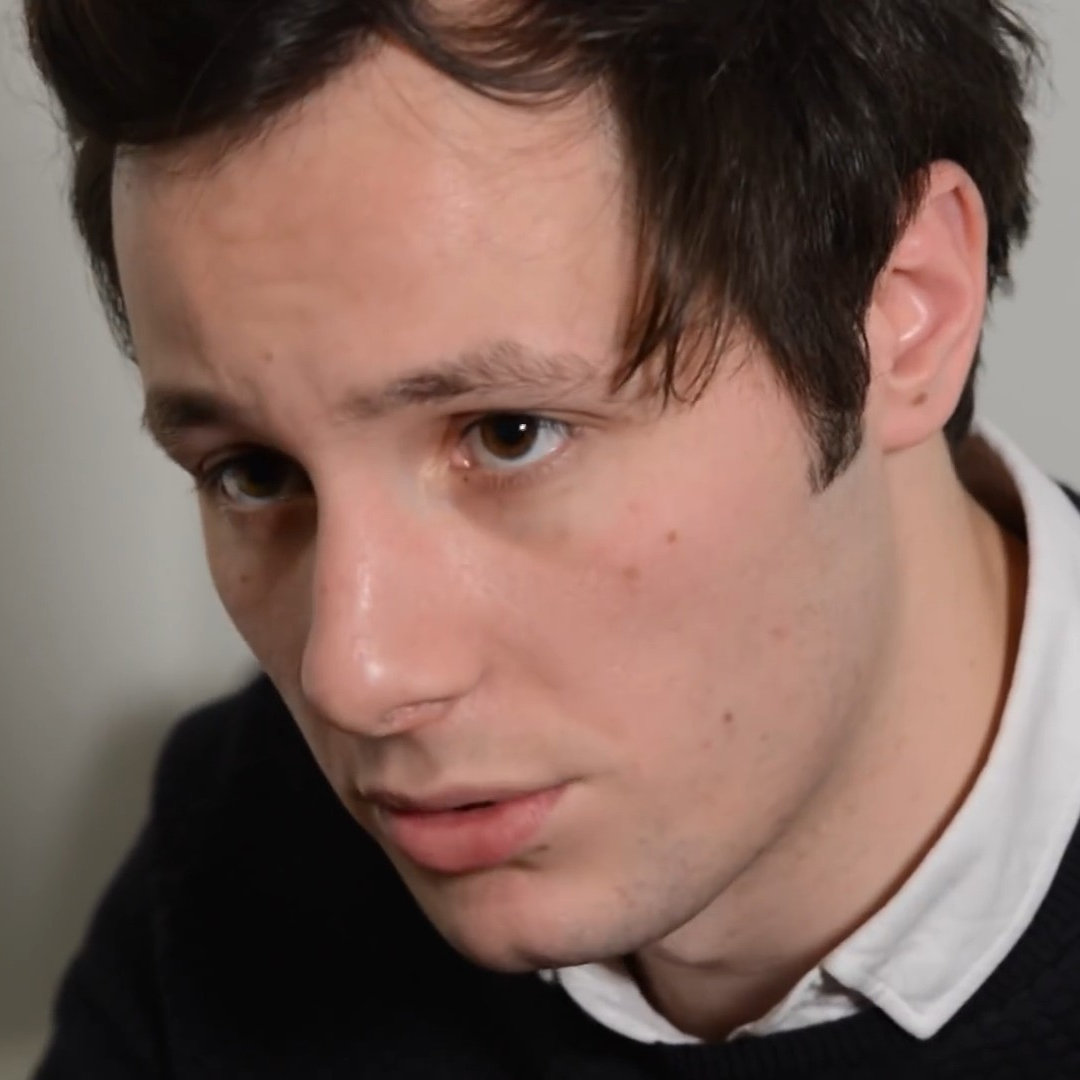
Vianney in 2014

Year	Award	Category	Nominated work	Result
2014	Virgin Radio	Male Revelation of the Year	Vianney	Won
2015	W9	Talents Award	Vianney	Won
2015	SACEM's Francis Lemarque Award	Best New Singer-Songwriter of the Year	Vianney	Won
2015	RFM Award	Songwriter of the Year	"Pas là"	Won
2015	Victoires de la musique	Revelation Album of the Year	Idées blanches	Nominated
2015	NRJ Music Award	Revelation Artist of the Year	Vianney	Nominated
2016	Victoires de la musique	Male Artist of the Year	Vianney	Won
2017	NRJ Music Award	Male Artist of the Year	Vianney	Nominated
2017	Victoires de la musique	Original Song of the Year		Won
2018	NRJ Music Awards	Francophone Group/Duo of the Year (with Gims)		Nominated
2018	NRJ Music Awards	Francophone Song of the Year		Nominated
2020	NRJ Music Awards	Francophone Male Artist of the Year		Nominated
2020	NRJ Music Awards	Francophone Performance of the Year		Nominated

== Discography ==
=== Studio albums ===
Title	Details	Peak chart positions				Certifications
Title	Details	FRA	BEL (Fl)	BEL (Wa)	SWI	Certifications
Idées blanches (including Idées blanches – Les acoustiques)	Released: 20 October 2014; Label: Tôt ou tard; Format: Digital download, CD	31	—	29	91	SNEP: 2× Platinum
Vianney	Released: 25 November 2016; Label: Tôt ou tard; Format: Digital download, CD	1	118	2	12	SNEP: Diamond
N'attendons pas	Released: 30 October 2020; Label: Tôt ou tard; Format: Digital download, CD	1	147	2	10	SNEP: Platinum
À 2 à 3	Released: 10 November 2023; Label: Tôt ou tard; Format: Digital download, CD	1	155	1	7	SNEP: 2× Platinum
Les évadés	Released: 6 November 2026; Label: Tôt ou tard; Format: Digital download, CD	1	—	4	7	
"—" denotes an album that did not chart or was not released.

=== Live albums ===
Title	Details	Peak chart positions			Certifications
Title	Details	FRA	BEL (Wa)	SWI	Certifications
Le Concert	Released: 9 November 2018; Label: Tôt ou tard; Format: Digital download, CD	11	27	33	SNEP: Gold

=== Singles ===
==== As lead artist ====
Title	Year	Peak chart positions					Certifications	Album
Title	Year	FRA	BEL (Fl)	BEL (Wa)	SWI	TUR	Certifications	Album
"Je te déteste"	2014	113	—	—	—	*		Idées blanches
"Pas là"	2014	18	— (Note: "Pas là" did not enter the Belgian Ultratop 50 Chart, but peaked at number 12 on the Bubbling Under Ultratip chart.)	13	—	*		Idées blanches
"Veronica"	2015	185	—	— (Note: "Veronica" did not enter the Belgian Ultratop 50 Chart, but peaked at number 15 on the Bubbling Under Ultratip chart.)	—	*		Idées blanches
"Les gens sont méchants"	2015	—	— (Note: "Les gens sont méchants" did not enter the Belgian Ultratop 50 Chart, but peaked at number 73 on the Bubbling Under Ultratip chart.)	—	—	*		Idées blanches
"On est bien comme ça"	2015	110	— (Note: "On est bien comme ça" did not enter the Belgian Ultratop 50 Chart, but peaked at number 16 on the Bubbling Under Ultratip chart.)	30	—	*		Idées blanches
"Je m'en vais"	2016	2	33	3	48	*	SNEP: Diamond	Vianney
"Moi aimer toi"	2017	71	— (Note: "Moi aimer toi" did not enter the Belgian Ultratop 50 Chart, but peaked at number 17 on the Bubbling Under Ultratip chart.)	8	—	*	SNEP: Diamond	Vianney
"Dumbo"	2017	151	— (Note: "Dumbo" did not enter the Belgian Ultratop 50 Chart, but peaked at number 38 on the Bubbling Under Ultratip chart.)	44	—	*	SNEP: Platinum	Vianney
"Si on chantait"	2017	—	—	—	—	*		Le Petit Spirou la bande originale
"Le Fils à papa"	2018	—	—	— (Note: "Le Fils à papa" did not enter the Belgian Ultratop 50 Chart, but peaked at number 20 on the Bubbling Under Ultratip chart.)	—	*		Vianney
"J'm'en fous"	2018	153	—	—	—	*		Vianney
"N'attendons pas"	2020	146	—	21	—	—	SNEP: Gold	N'attendons pas
"Beau-papa"	2020	13	—	2	—	—		N'attendons pas
"Dabali"	2021	141	—	—	—	—		Non-album singles
"Les imbéciles"	2021	—	—	22	—	—		Non-album singles
"Call on Me" (featuring Ed Sheeran)	2022	30	—	9	33	—		À 2 à 3
"Keep It Simple" (featuring Mika)	2023	—	—	19	—	10	SNEP: Platinum	À 2 à 3
"Le feu" (with Kendji Girac)	2023	29	—	9	—	—	SNEP: Diamond	À 2 à 3
"Comment on fait" (with Zazie)	2023	37	—	13	—	—	SNEP: Platinum	À 2 à 3
"Je suis fou" (with Kendji Girac and Soprano)	2023	61	42	—	—	—	SNEP: Platinum	À 2 à 3
"Where Do I Go" (with Rosa Linn)	2024	—	—	—	—	—		À 2 à 3 (Deluxe)
"D'or et d'étain"	2026	—	—	10	—	—		Les évadés
"—" denotes a recording that did not chart or was not released.

==== As featured artist ====
Title	Year	Peak chart positions				Certifications	Album
Title	Year	FRA	BEL (Fl)	BEL (Wa)	SWI	Certifications	Album
"Les Filles d'aujourd'hui" (Joyce Jonathan with Vianney)	2016	46	—	— (Note: "Les Filles d'aujourd'hui" did not enter the Belgian Ultratop 50 Chart, but peaked at number 26 on the Bubbling Under Ultratip chart.)	—	SNEP: Platinum	Une place pour moi
"La même" (with Maître Gims)	2018	1	21	1	24	SNEP: Diamond; BEA: 2× Platinum	Le Concert & Ceinture noire
"Chanson sur ma drôle de vie" (with Véronique Sanson)	2018	—	—	— (Note: "Chanson sur ma drôle de vie" did not enter the Belgian Ultratop 50 Chart, but peaked at number 40 on the Bubbling Under Ultratip chart.)	—		Le Concert & Duos volatils
"Allez reste" (Boulevard des airs featuring Vianney)	2019	69	—	38	—	SNEP: Platinum	Je me dis que toi aussi
"—" denotes a recording that did not chart or was not released.

=== Other charted songs ===
Title	Year	Peak chart positions	Album
Title	Year	FRA	Album
"Quand j'étais chanteur"	2016	142	J'étais un ange – Michel Delpech
"Sans le dire"	2016	185	Vianney
"J'm'en fous"	2017	153	Vianney
"Merci pour ça"	2020	190	N'attendons pas

=== As songwriter ===
Title	Year	Artist
"Donnez-moi"	2019	Les Frangines
"Je chanterai"	2019	Erza Muqoli
