= Dick Annegarn =

Dutch rock singer-songwriter

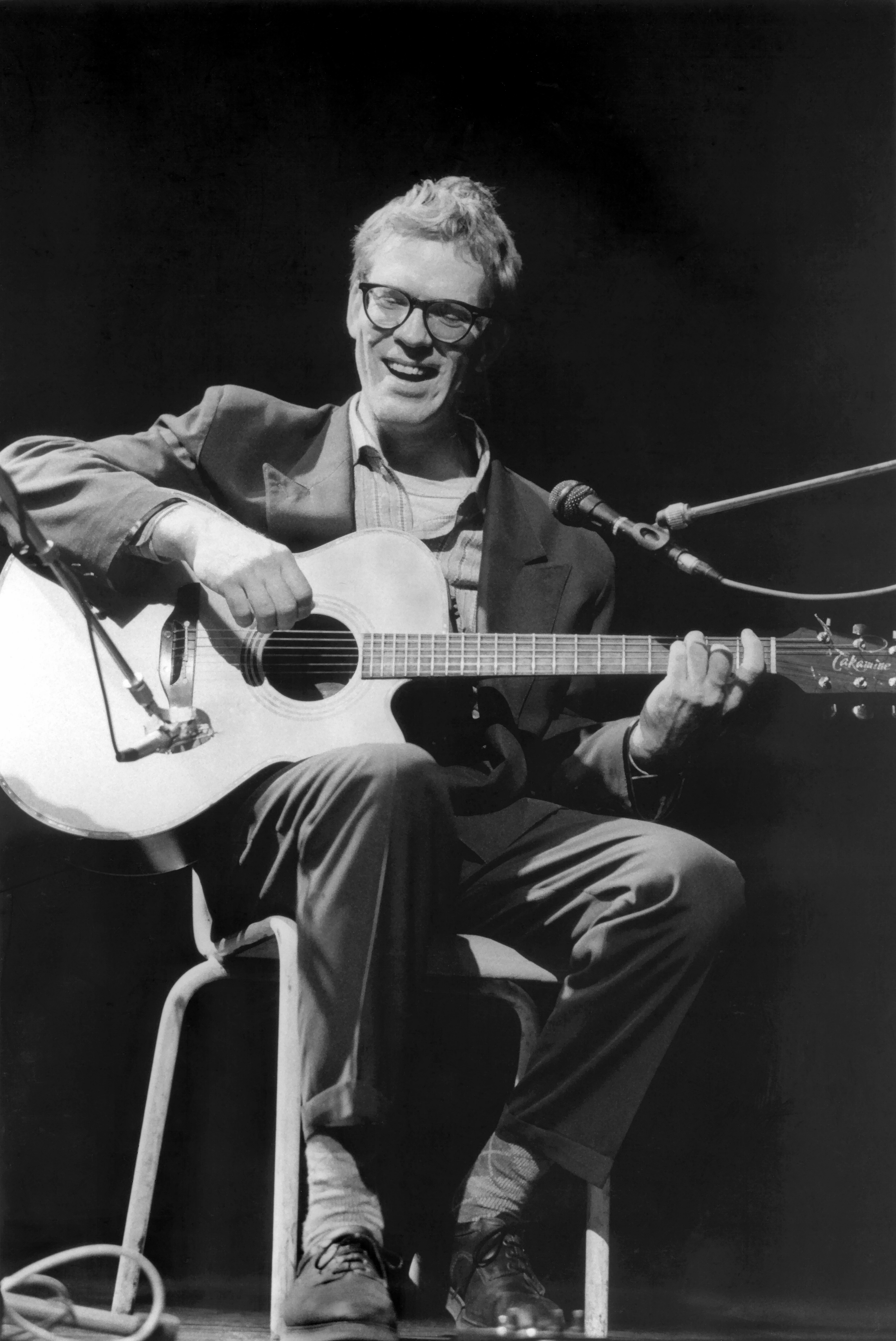
Dick Annegarn

Dick Annegarn (born in The Hague, 9 May 1952) is a Dutch rock singer-songwriter who sings mostly in French, and occasionally in Dutch and English.

== Discography ==
=== Albums ===
- Sacré Géranium (1974)
- Dicks (1974)
- Je te vois (1974)
- Mireille (1975)
- Anticyclone (1976)
- De ce spectacle ici sur terre (live, 1978)
- Ferraillages (1980)
- Citoyen (1981)
- 140 BL (live, 1984)
- Frère ? (1986)
- Ullegarra (1990)
- Chansons fleuves (1990)
- Dick (1992)
- Approche-toi (1997)
- Adieu Verdure (1999)
- Au Cirque d'Hiver (live, 2000)
- Un' ombre (2002)
- Plouc (2005)
- Soleil du soir (2008)
- Folk Talk (2011)
- Vélo va (2014)
- Twist (2016)
- 12 Villes 12 Chansons (2018)

=== Singles ===
- Va (1975)
- Lille CD promo (1998)
- Voleur de chevaux CD promo (1999)

=== Compilations ===
- Bruxelles (3 first albums + part of the 4th one+ the songs Va and Les Gueux) (1996)
- Les Années nocturnes (Frères ?, Ullegara and Chansons fleuves) (2007)

=== Contributions ===
- Egmont and the FF Boom, featuring Daniel Schell (1978 ?)
- Route Manset (1996)
- Aux suivants, Hommage à Jacques Brel (2003)
- Plutôt tôt Plutôt tard (2005, tôt ou tard)

=== Tribute album ===
- Le Grand Dîner or Tribute à Dick Annegarn (2006, tôt ou tard), on which he himself contributes
