= Vincent Delerm =

French musician

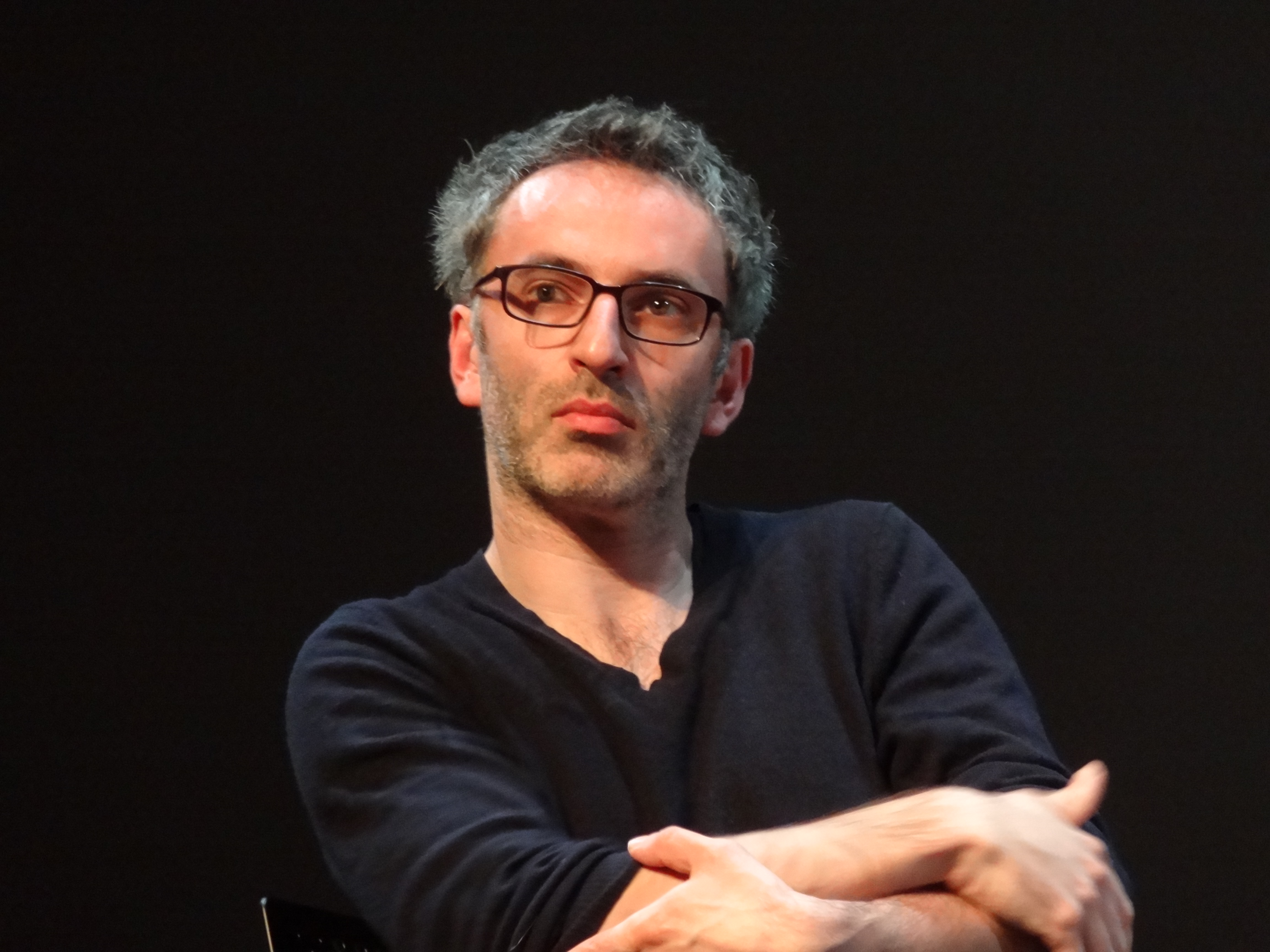

Background information
- Born: 31 August 1976 (age 50)
- Origin: Évreux, France
- Genre: Pop
- Instrument: Piano
- Years active: 1998–present
- Label: Tôt ou tard

Vincent Delerm (born 31 August 1976) is a French singer-songwriter, pianist and composer. He is the son of the writer Philippe Delerm and illustrator Martine Delerm.

His first album was released in 2002, the second, Kensington Square, in 2004, the third Les Piqûres d'araignée in 2006, the fourth Quinze Chansons in 2008 . All were released by the Tôt ou tard record label.

== Awards and nominations ==
Won

- 2003 Victoires de la Musique – "Album Revelation of the Year" for album Vincent Delerm
- 2003: Grand prix Sacem – Francis-Lemarque Award
- 2012: Chevalier des Arts et des Lettres

Nominations

- 2007 Victoires de la musique – "Male artist interpreter", "Best Album of song and variétés" for Les Piqûres d'araignée and "Best music video" for "Sous les avalanches" for director Bruno Sevaistre
- 2008 Victoires de la musique – "Musical shows, tours and concerts"
- 2009 Victoires de la musique – "Best Album of song and variétés" for album Quinze Chansons

== Discography ==
=== Albums ===
Year	Album	Peak positions			Notes
Year	Album	FRA	BEL (Wa)	SWI	Notes
2002	Vincent Delerm	3	8	26	Track list: 1. Fanny Ardant et moi 2. La vipère du Gabon; 3. Châtenay-Malabry; 4. Catégorie Bukowski; 5. Tes parents 6. Cosmopolitan (with Irène Jacob); 7. Slalom géant 8. Le monologue shakespearien 9. Charlotte Carrington; 10. Deauville sans Trintignant; 11. L'heure du thé
2004	Kensington Square	1	7	22	Track list: 1. Les filles de 1973 ont trente ans 2. Quatrième de couverture 3. Le baiser Modiano; 4. Veruca Salt et Frank Black (with Keren Ann and Dominique A); 5. Kensington Square; 6. Natation synchronisée 7. Évreux; 8. Anita Pettersen; 9. Deutsche Grammophon (with Irène Jacob); 10. Gare de Milan
2006	Les piqûres d'araignée	1	9	14	Track list: 1. Sous les avalanches 2. Je t’ai même pas dit 3. À Naples il y a peu d’endroits pour s’asseoir 4. Marine (with Peter von Poehl); 5. Ambroise Paré; 6. Sépia plein les doigts 7. Les Piqûres d’araignée 8. Déjà toi 9. 29 avril au 28 mai 10. Voici la ville 11. Il fait si beau 12. Favourite song (with Neil Hannon from The Divine Comedy); 13. Les Jambes de Steffi Graf
2008	Quinze Chansons	8	13	72	Track list: 1. Tous les acteurs s'appellent Terence; 2. Allan et Louise; 3. Je pense à toi 4. Martin Parr; 5. Le coeur des volleyeuses bat plus fort pour les volleyeurs 6. Et François de Roubaix dans le dos 7. Dans tes bras 8. 78543 habitants 9. Shea stadium 10. Un temps pour tout 11. North avenue 12. From a room 13. Un tacle de Patrick Vieira n'est pas une truite en chocolat 14. Monterey; 15. La vie est la même
2013	Les amants parallèles	24	65	–	Track list: 1. L'avion; 2. Le film 3. Bruit des nuits d'été 4. Robes; 5. Super Bowl; 6. Les amants parallèles 7. Grand plongeoir 8. Et la fois où tu as 9. Ces deux-là 10. Hacienda; 11. Ils avaient fait les valises dans la nuit 12. Embrasse-moi; 13. Le film II
2016	À présent	9	10	29	Track list: 1. La Vie Devant Soi; 2. Dans Le Décor; 3. Je Ne Veux Pas Mourir Ce Soir; 4. Danser Sur La Table; 5. Les Chanteurs Sont Tous Les Mêmes; 6. La Dernière Fois Que Je t'ai Vu; 7. Un Été; 8. Cristina; 9. Êtes-vous Heureux; 10. À Présent; 11. Le Garçon
2019	Panorama	16	14	24	Track list: 1. Je Ne Sais Pas Si C'est Tout Le Monde; 2. Vie Varda; 3. Panorama; 4. La Chamade; 5. Les Enfants Pâles; 6. Ce Qui Restera; 7. Pardon Les Sentiments; 8. Carver; 9. Ces deux-là 10. Hacienda; 11. Fernando De Noronha; 12. Photographies

Live albums

Year	Album	Peak positions	
Year	Album	FRA	BEL (Wa)
2007	Favourite Songs	40	–
2007	À la Cigale	49	82

== Film scores ==
- The Very Private Life of Mister Sim (2015)

== DVD ==
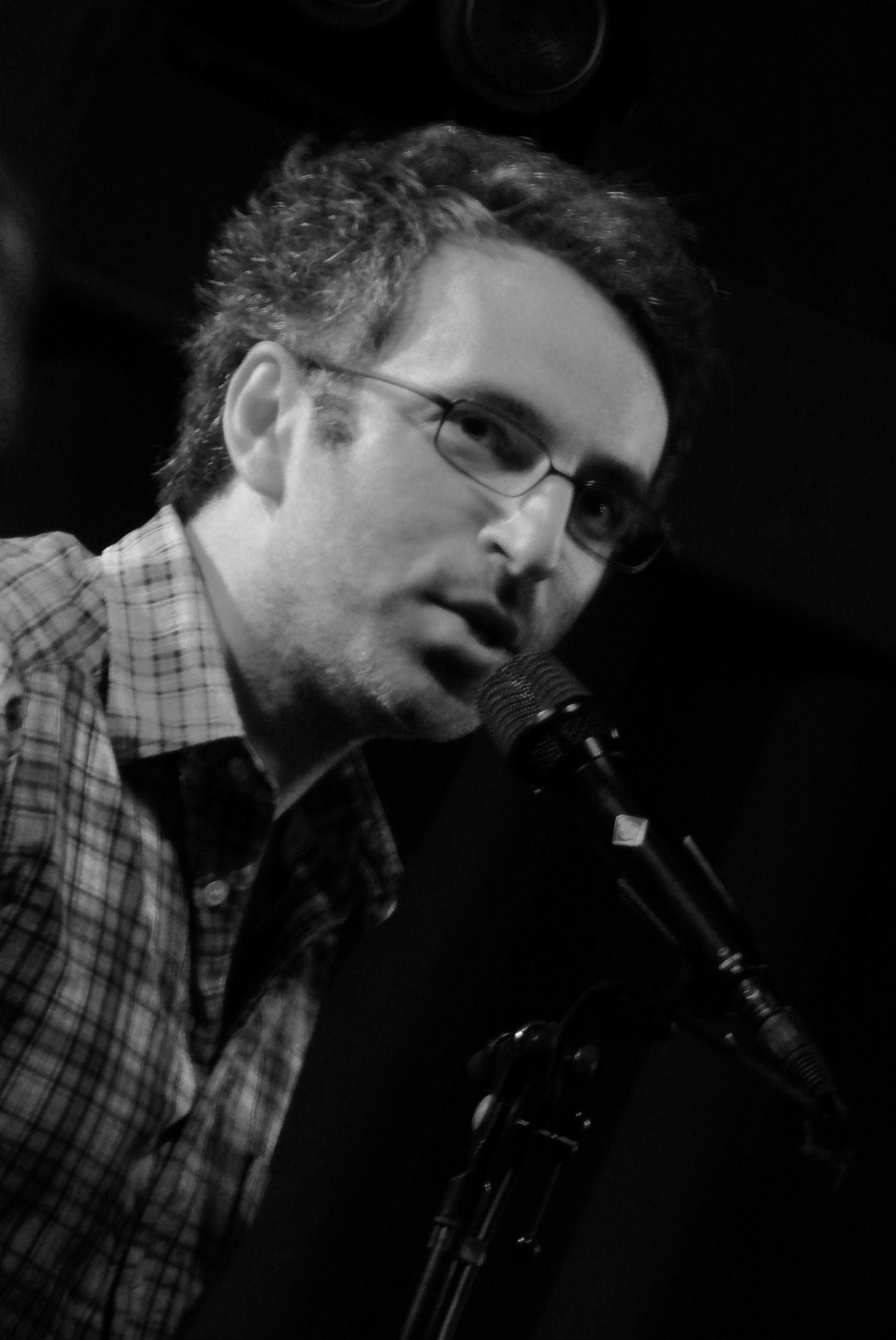

- Vincent Delerm : Un soir Boulevard Voltaire published 21 October 2003.

== Bibliography ==
- Songbook Vincent Delerm – 11 titres piano chant, ed. Lili Louise Musique (2003)

== Honours ==
- 2003: Victoires de la musique (category "best album").
- 2003: Prix Francis Lemarque from Sacem
