= Tôt ou Tard =

French record label

- Parent company: Wagram Music (51%); Believe Digital (49%)
- Founded: 1996
- Status: Active
- Distributor(s): Believe Digital
- Genre: Pop • art rock
- Country of origin: France
- Official website: totoutard.com

Tôt ou Tard (stylized as tôt Ou tard) is an independent French record label. It was founded in 1996 as a break-off from Warner Music Group, and turned independent in 2002. The name of the label can be translated as "Sooner or later" in French. Vincent Frèrebeau heads the label, which has about thirty bands and artists signed to it (in 2005). In 2011, Wagram Music acquired a stake in the label and became its exclusive distributor. In September 2018, Wagram Music sold a 49% stake in Tôt ou Tard to Believe Digital.

In 2024, a three-episode documentary about the label, released on YouTube, was directed by Benoît Toulemonde and Didier Varrod.

== Artists signed ==
- Adé
- Constance Amiot
- Dick Annegarn
- François Audrain
- Mathieu Boogaerts
- Françoiz Breut
- Cats on Trees
- Da Silva
- Vincent Delerm
- Fabulous Trobadors
- Piers Faccini
- Mohamed Fellag
- Thomas Fersen
- Ben Howard
- Agnès Jaoui
- Seun Kuti
- Lisa LeBlanc
- Luce
- Fabrice Luchini
- Franck Monnet
- Erza Muqoli
- Yael Naim
- Shaka Ponk
- Roseaux
- Albin de la Simone
- Têtes Raides
- Vianney
- Peter von Poehl
- Patrick Watson
- Wave Machines
- Mentissa

== Former artists ==
- Stanley Beckford
- Jeanne Cherhal
- Jacques Higelin
- Lhasa de Sela
- Pierre Perret
- Gianmaria Testa
- Venus

== See also ==
- List of record labels
